= List of premiers of Yukon =

The Canadian territory of Yukon has had a responsible government since 1978. In the 19th century, Yukon was a segment of the Hudson's Bay Company-administered North-Western Territory and then the Canadian-administered Northwest Territories. The territory only obtained a recognizable local government in 1895 when it became a separate district of the Northwest Territories. In 1898, Yukon was made a separate territory with its own commissioner and appointed Territorial Council. Prior to the creation of the Yukon Legislative Assembly in 1978, the Territorial Council had a largely advisory role with no political parties or government leader. Instead, powers were invested in the governing Commissioner appointed by the federal government.

Yukon has had twelve premiers since 1978, of which six were from the Yukon Party and its predecessor the Yukon Progressive Conservative Party, four were from the Yukon Liberal Party, and two were from the Yukon New Democratic Party. The Government of Yukon does not publish an official list of premiers. Listed here are the terms of serve as provided by the Parliament of Canada.

== Premiers of Yukon ==
Yukon Liberal Party Yukon New Democratic Party Yukon Progressive Conservative Party Yukon Party

No.	Portrait	Name (Birth–Death)	Term of office	Electoral mandates (Assembly)	Political party	Parliamentary seat	Ref.
Government Leaders of Yukon
1		Chris Pearson (1931–2014)	14 December 1978 – 22 March 1985	1978 election (24th Leg.) 1982 election (25th Leg.)	Progressive Conservative (Ldr. 1978)	MLA for Riverdale North	
2		Willard Phelps (b. 1941)	23 March 1985 – 28 May 1985	Appointment (25th Leg.)	Progressive Conservative (Ldr. 1985)	Did not hold a seat in legislature	
3		Tony Penikett (b. 1945)	29 May 1985 – 6 November 1992	1985 election (26th Leg.) 1989 election (27th Leg.)	New Democratic (Ldr. 1981)	MLA for Whitehorse West	
4		John Ostashek (1936–2007)	7 November 1992 – 18 October 1996	1992 election (28th Leg.)	Yukon Party (Ldr. 1991)	MLA for Porter Creek North	
Premiers of Yukon
5		Piers McDonald (b. 1955)	19 October 1996 – 5 May 2000	1996 election (29th Leg.)	New Democratic (Ldr. 1995)	MLA for McIntyre-Takhini	
6		Pat Duncan (b. 1960)	6 May 2000 – 30 November 2002	2000 election (30th Leg.)	Liberal (Ldr. 1998)	MLA for Porter Creek South	
7		Dennis Fentie (1950–2019)	30 November 2002 – 10 June 2011	2002 election (31st Leg.) 2006 election (32nd Leg.)	Yukon Party (Ldr. 2002)	MLA for Watson Lake	
8		Darrell Pasloski (b. 1960)	11 June 2011 – 3 December 2016	Appointment (32nd Leg.) 2011 election (33rd Leg.)	Yukon Party (Ldr. 2011)	MLA for Mountainview	
9		Sandy Silver (b. 1969)	3 December 2016 – 14 January 2023	2016 election (34th Leg.) 2021 election (35th Leg.)	Liberal (Ldr. 2012)	MLA for Klondike	
10		Ranj Pillai (b. 1974)	14 January 2023 – 27 June 2025	Appointment (35th Leg.)	Liberal (Ldr. 2023)	MLA for Porter Creek South	
11		Mike Pemberton (b. 1963)	27 June 2025 – 22 November 2025	Appointment (35th Leg.)	Liberal (Ldr. 2025)	Did not hold a seat in legislature	
12		Currie Dixon (b. 1985)	22 November 2025 – incumbent	2025 election (36th Leg.)	Yukon Party (Ldr. 2020)	MLA for Copperbelt North	
12		Currie Dixon (b. 1985)	First Yukon-born premier.				

== See also ==
- List of Yukon commissioners
- List of Yukon Leaders of Opposition
