= 24th Legislature of Yukon =

Legislature of Yukon, Canada, 1978–1982

The 24th Yukon Legislative Assembly convened in 1978, This is the first conventional legislature in the history of Canada's Yukon Territory and the first one with organized along political party lines following the passage of the Yukon Elections Act in 1977. The Progressive Conservatives led by Hilda Watson who won led the party to victory in the 1978 territorial election, in which she was the party's candidate in the electoral district of Kluane. However, she did not win her riding, and therefore did not become government leader. After the election, four of the elected members in the Progressive Conservative Party, including Chris Pearson, were added to the Executive Committee headed by Commissioner Art Pearson. In October 1979, at the instruction of Jake Epp, Federal Minister of Indian Affairs and Northern Development, the Commissioner withdrew from direct government administration; Chris Pearson became Government Leader (equal to Premier), added a fifth member of the PC Party caucus, and formed the Executive Council of Yukon, thus beginning responsible government with an elected head of government in The Yukon. Art Pearson would later resign as Commissioner after pleading guilty to charges related to improper mining claim transfers and was replaced with Frank Fingland.

== Membership in the 24th Assembly ==
The following members were elected to the 24th Yukon Legislative Assembly in the general election of 1978:

Member	Party	Electoral district	First elected / previously elected	No. of terms
Robert Fleming	Independent	Campbell	1974	2nd term
Robert Fleming	Progressive Conservative	Campbell	1974	2nd term
Maurice Byblow	Independent	Faro	1978	1st term
Maurice Byblow	NDP	Faro	1978	1st term
Al Falle	Progressive Conservative	Hootalinqua	1978	1st term
Meg McCall	Progressive Conservative	Klondike	1978	1st term
Alice McGuire	Liberal	Kluane	1978	1st term
Swede Hanson	Progressive Conservative	Mayo	1978	1st term
Grafton Njootli	Progressive Conservative	Old Crow	1978	1st term
Grafton Njootli	Independent	Old Crow	1978	1st term
Howard Tracey	Progressive Conservative	Tatchun	1978	1st term
Don Taylor	Progressive Conservative	Watson Lake	1961	6th term
Geoff Lattin	Progressive Conservative	Whitehorse North Centre	1978	1st term
Daniel Lang	Progressive Conservative	Whitehorse Porter Creek East	1974	2nd term
Doug Graham	Progressive Conservative	Whitehorse Porter Creek West	1978	1st term
Chris Pearson	Progressive Conservative	Whitehorse Riverdale North	1978	1st term
Iain MacKay	Liberal	Whitehorse Riverdale South	1978	1st term
Ron Veale (1981)	Liberal	Whitehorse Riverdale South	1981	1st term
Jack Hibberd	Progressive Conservative	Whitehorse South Centre	1974	2nd term
Roger Kimmerly (1981)	NDP	Whitehorse South Centre	1981	1st term
Tony Penikett	NDP	Whitehorse West	1978	1st term

=== Membership changes ===
Changes in seats held (1978-1982)
Seat	Before				Change		
Seat	Date	Member	Party	Reason	Date	Member	Party
Old Crow	May 25, 1979	Grafton Njootli	█ PC	Removed from PC Caucus			█ Independent
Whitehorse Riverdale South	January 1981	Iain MacKay	█ Liberal	Resignation	March 9, 1981	Ron Veale	█ Liberal
Campbell	April 27, 1981	Robert Fleming	█ Independent	Joined PC Caucus			█ PC
Faro	September 16, 1981	Maurice Byblow	█ Independent	Joined NDP Caucus			█ New Democratic
Whitehorse South Centre	April 15, 1981	Jack Hibberd	█ PC	Resignation	October 13, 1981	Roger Kimmerly	█ New Democratic

- The New Democratic Party forms Official Opposition, following Whitehorse South Centre by-election.

== By-elections ==
2 by-elections was held in the districts of Whitehorse Riverdale South and Whitehorse South Centre in 1981.

Electoral district	Member elected	Affiliation	Election date	Reason
Whitehorse Riverdale South	Ron Veale	Liberal	March 9, 1981	Iain MacKay resigned as MLA and party leader on 9 August 1980
Whitehorse South Centre	Roger Kimmerly	NDP	October 13, 1981	Jack Hibberd resigned on 15 April 1981
