= 1985 Yukon general election =

Canadian territorial election

← 1982	May 13, 1985	1989 →

16 seats of the Yukon Legislative Assembly 9 seats needed for a majority
- Turnout: 78.40% (▼0.32pp)
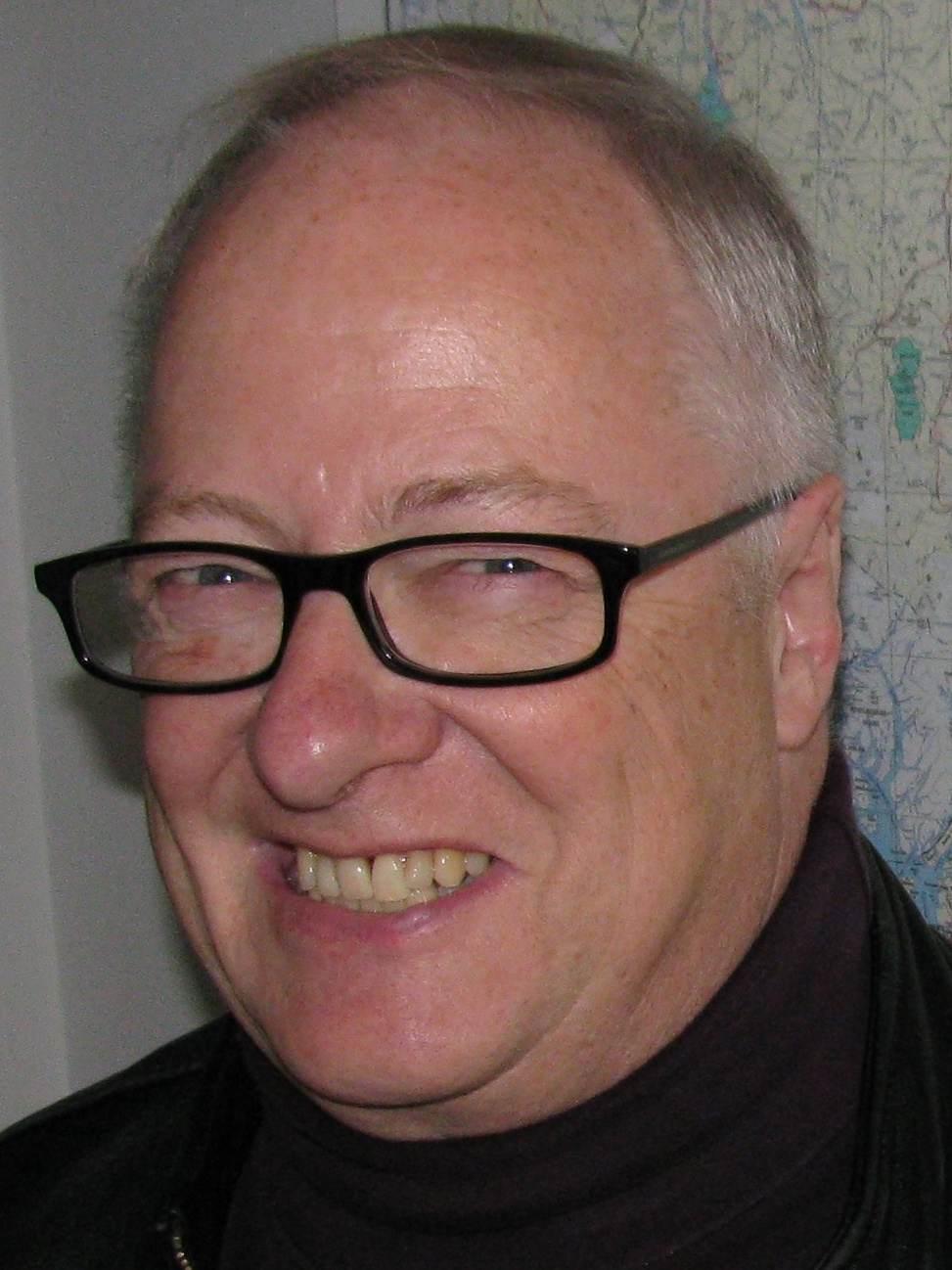
	First party	Second party	Third party
		PC	Lib
Leader	Tony Penikett	Willard Phelps	Roger Coles
Party	New Democratic	Progressive Conservative	Liberal
Leader since	1981	March 23, 1985	1984
Leader's seat	Whitehorse West	Ran in Hootalinqua (won)	Ran in Tatchun (won)
Last election	6	9	0
Seats won	8	6	2
Seat change	▲2	▼3	▲2
Popular vote	4,335	4,948	806
Percentage	41.10%	46.91%	7.64%
Swing	▲5.68pp	▲1.12pp	▼7.38pp
- Popular vote by riding. As this is an FPTP election, seat totals are not determined by popular vote, but instead via results by each riding. Riding names are listed at the bottom.
Premier before election
Willard Phelps
Progressive Conservative
Premier after election
Tony Penikett
New Democratic

The 1985 Yukon general election was held on May 13, 1985 to elect members of the 26th Legislative Assembly of the territory of Yukon, Canada. It was the first Yukon general election with live results coverage on television, and was suspenseful as telecommunications problems prevented the results of the Old Crow riding from being known outside of that community. It was won by the New Democratic Party.

== Results by Party ==
Summary of the 1985 Legislative Assembly of Yukon election results
Party	Party leader	Candidates	Seats				Popular vote		
Party	Party leader	Candidates	1982	Dissol.	1985	Change	#	%	Change
New Democratic	Tony Penikett	16	6	6	8	+2	4,335	41.10%	+5.68%
Progressive Conservative	Willard Phelps	16	9	9	6	-3	4,948	46.91%	+1.12%
Liberal	Roger Coles	8	0	0	2	+2	806	7.64%	-7.38%
Independent		4	1	1	0	-1	458	4.34%	N/A
Total		44	16	16	16		10,547	100.00%	

Popular vote
PC	46.91%
New Democratic	41.10%
Liberal	7.64%
Independent	4.34%

Seats summary
New Democratic	50.00%
PC	37.50%
Liberal	12.50%

== Incumbents not Running for Reelection ==
The following MLAs had announced that they would not be running in the 1985 election:

New Democratic Party

- Maurice Byblow (Faro)

Progressive Conservative

- Al Falle (Hootalinqua)
- Clarke Ashley (Klondike)
- Chris Pearson (Whitehorse Riverdale North)
- Kathie Nukon (Old Crow)

== Results by Riding ==
Bold indicates party leaders
† - denotes a retiring incumbent MLA

Electoral district	Candidates				Incumbent
Electoral district	PC	Liberal	NDP	Other	Incumbent
Campbell	Nancy Dieckmann; 248		Sam Johnston; 313		Dave Porter
Faro	Ted Bartsch; 97	Jim McLachlan; 142	Sybil Frei; 121		Maurice Byblow†
Hootalinqua	**Willard Phelps**; 461		Tom Burke; 399		Al Falle†
Klondike	Helmut Schoener; 316		Art Webster; 375		Clarke Ashley†
Kluane	Bill Brewster; 237	Tony Stanevicius; 63	Scott Gilbert; 95		Bill Brewster
Mayo	Ken Cooper; 183	Rob Andison; 18	Piers McDonald; 251		Piers McDonald
Old Crow	Alice Frost; 61		Norma Kassi; 67		Kathie Nukon†
Tatchun	Howard Tracey; 93	**Roger Coles**; 159	Victor Mitander; 131		Howard Tracey
Watson Lake	Don McIntosh; 90		Dave Porter; 183	Don Taylor; 174; Brian Shanahan; 119	Don Taylor
Whitehorse North Centre	Ken McKinnon; 241		Margaret Commodore; 300	George Stalker; 66	Margaret Commodore
Whitehorse Porter Creek East	Dan Lang; 527	Hans Bierstedt; 90	Gerry Dobson; 230		Dan Lang
Whitehorse Porter Creek West	Andy Philipsen; 393		Ross Priest; 280	Frances Nowasad; 99	Andy Philipsen
Whitehorse Riverdale North	Doug Phillips; 540	Terry Hamilton; 84	Jim Lockhart; 268		Chris Pearson†
Whitehorse Riverdale South	Bea Firth; 627	Willie Harasymow; 165	Betty Irwin; 260		Bea Firth
Whitehorse South Centre	Ron Granger; 303	Arthur Giovinazzo; 85	Roger Kimmerly; 346		Roger Kimmerly
Whitehorse West	Charlie Friday; 531		**Tony Penikett**; 716		Tony Penikett
