= List of Yukon NDP members =

This is a list of members of the Yukon, Canada, branch of the Co-operative Commonwealth Federation (CCF), a social democratic political party, and its successor, the Yukon New Democratic Party (NDP).

== List by date of election ==
=== 1944 general election ===
One CCF candidate was elected in the 1944 election to the Yukon Territorial Council. Three seats were available. The other two seats were won by non-partisan candidates.

- Alex Smith - ? - CCF - Whitehorse - 1943–1947

=== 1947 general election ===
In the 1947 election, no CCF candidates ran.

=== 1949 general election ===
One CCF candidate was elected in the 1949 election to the Yukon Territorial Council. Three seats were available. The other two seats were won by non-partisan candidates.

- Charles J. "Bunny" Lelievre - ? - CCF - Dawson City - 1949–1952

=== 1952 general election ===
No Candidates

=== 1955 general election ===
No candidates

=== 1958 general election ===
No candidates

=== 1961 general election ===
No candidates

=== 1964 general election ===
No candidates

=== 1967 general election ===
No candidates

=== 1970 general election ===
No candidates

=== 1974 general election ===
Two NDP candidates were elected in the twelve seats available in the 1974 election to the Yukon Territorial Council. The other ten seats returned non-partisan candidates.

- Fred Berger - ? - NDP - Dawson - 1974–1978 (ran, NDP lost)
- Stuart McCall - ? - NDP - Faro - 1974–1978 (ran, NDP lost)

=== 1978 general election ===
One of the fourteen NDP candidates was elected in the sixteen seats available in the 1978 election to the newly created Yukon Legislative Assembly. This was the first fully partisan election.

- Tony Penikett - NDP - City Councillor - Whitehorse 1978-1982-1985-1989-1992-?

=== 1981 by-election ===
One NDP candidate won a by-election, and one MLA elected as an independent crossed the floor to the NDP, which gave it enough seats to form the Official Opposition.

- Maurice Byblow - teacher & businessman - Faro 1978-1981 independent, NDP 1981-1982-1985 (retired, NDP lost), 1989
- Roger Kimmerly - NDP - Judge - Whitehorse South Centre 1981 by-election -1982-1985-1989 (moved out of Yukon, NDP won)

=== 1982 general election ===
Three NDP MLAs were re-elected in the 1982 election, and three more won for the first time for a total of six of the sixteen seats in the Legislature. The NDP again formed the Official Opposition.

- Piers McDonald - NDP - trade unionist - Mayo (Elsa) 1982-1985-1989-?, McIntyre-Takhini 1992-1996-2000 (ran, NDP lost)
- Margaret Commodore - NDP - Native activist - Whitehorse North 1982-1985-1989, Whitehorse Centre 1992
- Dave Porter - NDP - Native activist - Campbell 1982-1985, Watson Lake 1985-1989 (retired, NDP lost)

=== 1985 General Election ===
The six NDP MLAs were re-elected, and two more won for the first time for a total of eight of the sixteen seats in the Legislature. The NDP formed a minority government.

- Sam Johnston - NDP - former chief of Teslin Tlingit Council - Campbell 1985-1989-1992
- Art Webster - NDP - City Councillor - Klondike 1985-1989, later Mayor of Dawson City
- Norma Kassi - NDP - native activist - Old Crow 1985-1989-?

=== 1987 by-election ===
The NDP won one by-election in 1987, to give it a majority in the Legislature.

- Danny Joe - NDP - former Chief Selkirk First Nation - Tatchun 1987 by-election-1989, 1992, to 1996

=== 1989 general election ===
The NDP won nine of the sixteen seats available in the 1989 election, and formed a majority government.

- Joyce Hayden - NDP - Whitehorse South Centre 1989-1992

=== 1992 general election ===
The NDP lost the election to the Yukon Party and became the official opposition.

- Trevor Harding - Faro - 1992-1996-2000, Interim leader in 2000, resigned in 2001
- Lois Moorcroft - Mount Lorne - ? by-election -1996 Lost in 2000
- David Sloan - Whitehorse West - ? by-election -1996 Lost in 2000

=== 1996 general election ===
NDP won the election and formed a majority government under Piers McDonald.

- Gary McRobb Activist - Kluane - 1996-2000-2002-2006, May (Became a Liberal)
- Doug Livingston schoolteacher and principal - Lake Laberge - 1996, resigned in 1999
- Eric Fairclough Chief Little Salmon/Carmacks First Nation - Mayo-Tatchun - 1996-2000-2002-May 2006 (Became a Liberal), Party leader 2001-2002
- Dave Keenan Chief, Teslin Tlingit Council - Ross River Southern Lakes - 1996-2000, did not run again.
- Robert Bruce - Vuntut Gwitchin - 1996-1997 by-election because of recount of 1996 vote-2000 retired
- Dennis Fentie logger - Watson Lake - 1996-2000-2002 (switched parties)
- Todd Hardy Trade union leader - Whitehorse Centre - 1996-2000 (ran, NDP lost), 2002-2006-(died 2010) Party leader 2002-2009

=== 2000 general election ===
NDP lost the election, but became the official opposition

- Lorraine Peter - Vuntut Gwitchin - 2000-2002-2006 (ran, NDP lost)

=== 2002 general election ===
The NDP won five of the 18 seats available in the 2002 election, and formed the Official opposition.

- Steve Cardiff - Mount Lorne 2002–2006–(died 2011, riding dissolved)

=== 2006 general election ===
The NDP won three of the 18 seats available in the 2006 election.

- John Edzerza - McIntyre-Takhini - elected as a Yukon Party MLA 2002, joined NDP in 2006-2009 (quit NDP, rejoined Yukon Party, retired in 2011)

=== 2010 by-election ===
- Elizabeth Hanson, NDP leader (2009-2019) - Whitehorse Centre - byelection 2010-2011-2016-2021 (retired, NDP hold)

=== 2011 general election ===
The NDP won six of 19 seats in the 2011 Yukon general election and became the Official Opposition

- Kevin Barr - Mount Lorne-Southern Lakes, 2011-2016 (ran 2016, NDP lost)
- Jan Stick - Riverdale South, 2011-2016 (ran 2016, NDP lost)
- Jim Tredger - Mayo-Tatchun, 2011-2016 (ran 2016, NDP lost)
- Kate White - NDP leader (2019–present) - Takhini-Kopper King, 2011-2016-2021-2025–present

=== 2016 general election ===
The NDP won two seats, both belonging to incumbents, in the 2016 Yukon general election

=== 2021 general election ===
In the 2021 Yukon general election, the NDP won three seats forming a supply and confidence agreement with the Yukon Liberals, a gain of one seat.

- Annie Blake - Vuntut Gwitchin, 2021–2025
- Emily Tredger (Note: Now known as Lane Tredger) - Whitehorse Centre, 2021–2025–present

=== 2025 general election ===
Four new NDP members were elected for the first time in the 2025 Yukon general election:

- Carmen Gustafson - Riverdale North - 2025–Present
- Brent McDonald - Klondike - 2025–Present
- Linda Moen - Mountainview - 2025–Present
- Justin Ziegler - Riverdale South - 2025–Present

Two sitting members won reelection, with the NDP forming the official opposition.

== Prominent NDPers/CCFers at the municipal level ==
- Mike Comadain - CCF - mayor of Dawson City
- Art Webster - mayor of Dawson City

== See also ==
- List of CCF/NDP members
- List of British Columbia CCF/NDP members
- List of Alberta CCF/NDP members
- List of Saskatchewan CCF/NDP members
- List of Manitoba CCF/NDP members
- List of Ontario CCF/NDP members
- List of Nova Scotia CCF/NDP members
