= 1982 Yukon general election =

Canadian territorial election

← 1978	June 7, 1982	1985 →

16 seats of the Yukon Legislative Assembly 9 seats needed for a majority
- Turnout: 78.72% (▲8.29pp)
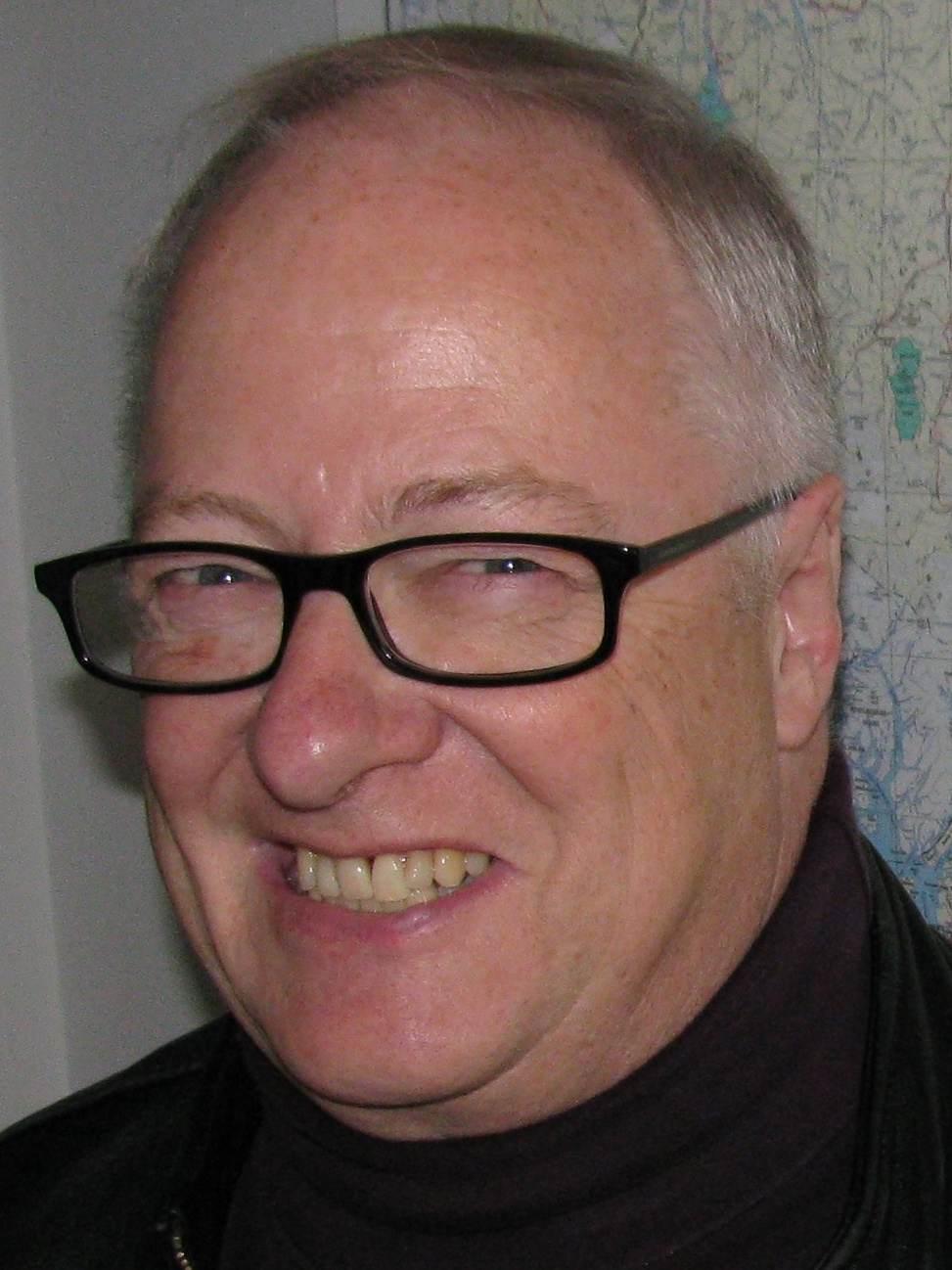
	First party	Second party	Third party
	PC		Lib
Leader	Chris Pearson	Tony Penikett	Ron Veale
Party	Progressive Conservative	New Democratic	Liberal
Leader since	December 8, 1978	1981	1981
Leader's seat	Whitehorse Riverdale North	Whitehorse West	Whitehorse Riverdale South (lost re-election)
Last election	11	1	2
Seats won	10	6	0
Seat change	▼1	▲5	▼2
Popular vote	4,770	3,689	1,564
Percentage	45.79%	35.42%	15.02%
Swing	▲8.69pp	▲15.15pp	▼13.44pp
- Popular vote by riding. As this is an FPTP election, seat totals are not determined by popular vote, but instead via results by each riding. Riding names are listed at the bottom.
Premier before election
Chris Pearson
Progressive Conservative
Premier after election
Chris Pearson
Progressive Conservative

The 1982 Yukon general election was held on June 7, 1982, to elect members of the 25th Legislative Assembly of the territory of Yukon, Canada. It was won by the Progressive Conservatives.

== Results by Party ==
Summary of the 1982 Legislative Assembly of Yukon election results
Party	Party leader	Candidates	Seats				Popular vote		
Party	Party leader	Candidates	1978	Dissol.	1982	Change	#	%	Change
Progressive Conservative	Chris Pearson	16	11	10	10	-1	4,770	45.79%	+8.69%
New Democratic	Tony Penikett	16	1	3	6	+5	3,689	35.42%	+15.15%
Liberal	Ron Veale	15	2	2	0	-2	1,564	15.02%	-13.44%
Independent		4	2	1	0	-2	393	3.77%	N/A
Total		51	16	16	16		10,416	100.00%	

Popular vote
Progressive Conservative	45.79%
New Democratic	35.42%
Liberal	15.02%
Independent	3.77%

Seats summary
Progressive Conservative	62.50%
New Democratic	37.50%

== Member Changes from Previous Election ==
Changes in seats held (1978-1982)
Seat	Before				Change		
Seat	Date	Member	Party	Reason	Date	Member	Party
Old Crow	May 25, 1979	Grafton Njootli	█ PC	Removed from PC Caucus			█ Independent
Whitehorse Riverdale South	January 1981	Iain MacKay	█ Liberal	Resignation	March 9, 1981	Ron Veale	█ Liberal
Campbell	April 27, 1981	Robert Fleming	█ Independent	Joined PC Caucus			█ PC
Faro	September 16, 1981	Maurice Byblow	█ Independent	Joined NDP Caucus			█ New Democratic
Whitehorse South Centre	April 15, 1981	Jack Hibberd	█ PC	Resignation	October 13, 1981	Roger Kimmerly	█ New Democratic

- The New Democratic Party forms Official Opposition, following Whitehorse South Centre by-election.

== Incumbents not Running for Reelection ==
The following MLAs had announced that they would not be running in the 1982 election:

Progressive Conservative

- Doug Graham (Whitehorse Porter Creek West)
- Meg McCall (Klondike)

== Results by Riding ==
Bold indicates party leaders
† - denotes a retiring incumbent MLA

Electoral district	Candidates				Incumbent
Electoral district	PC	Liberal	NDP	Other	Incumbent
Campbell	Robert Fleming; 214	Bill Webber; 43	Dave Porter; 225		Robert Fleming
Faro	Doris Gates; 205	Wayne Peace; 160	Maurice Byblow; 357		Maurice Byblow
Hootalinqua	Al Falle; 368	Patrick James; 92	Max Fraser; 344		Al Falle
Klondike	Clarke Ashley; 306		Art Webster; 283		Meg McCall†
Kluane	Bill Brewster; 241	Alice McGuire; 16	Dave Joe; 196		Alice McGuire
Mayo	Swede Hanson; 173	Eleanor Van Bibber; 35	Piers McDonald; 230		Swede Hanson
Old Crow	Kathie Nukon; 59	Abraham Peter; 29	Bruce Charlie; 35	Grafton Njootli; 11	Grafton Njootli
Tatchun	Howard Tracey; 106	Roger Coles; 103	Bill Larson; 101		Howard Tracey
Watson Lake	Dave Rollie; 142	Eileen Van Bibber; 60	James Cahill; 18	Don Taylor; 170; Brian Shanahan; 154	Don Taylor
Whitehorse North Centre	Geoff Lattin; 227	Bert Hadvick; 65	Margaret Commodore; 292	Don Branigan; 58	Geoff Lattin
Whitehorse Porter Creek East	Dan Lang; 645	Betty Toews; 92	Gerry Dobson; 240		Dan Lang
Whitehorse Porter Creek West	Andy Philipsen; 299	Lawrence Whelan; 45	David Cosco; 119		Doug Graham†
Whitehorse Riverdale North	**Chris Pearson**; 395	Jim Kennelly; 188	Velma Smith; 148		Chris Pearson
Whitehorse Riverdale South	Bea Firth; 562	**Ron Veale**; 469	Jon Pierce; 232		Ron Veale
Whitehorse South Centre	Chuck Rear; 320	Carol Christian; 108	Roger Kimmerly; 328		Roger Kimmerly
Whitehorse West	Pat Harvey; 508	Adam Skrutkowski; 59	**Tony Penikett**; 541		Tony Penikett
