= 1989 Yukon general election =

Canadian territorial election

| ← 1985 | February 20, 1989 | 1992 → |

16 seats of the Yukon Legislative Assembly 9 seats needed for a majority
- Turnout: 77.07% (▼1.33pp)
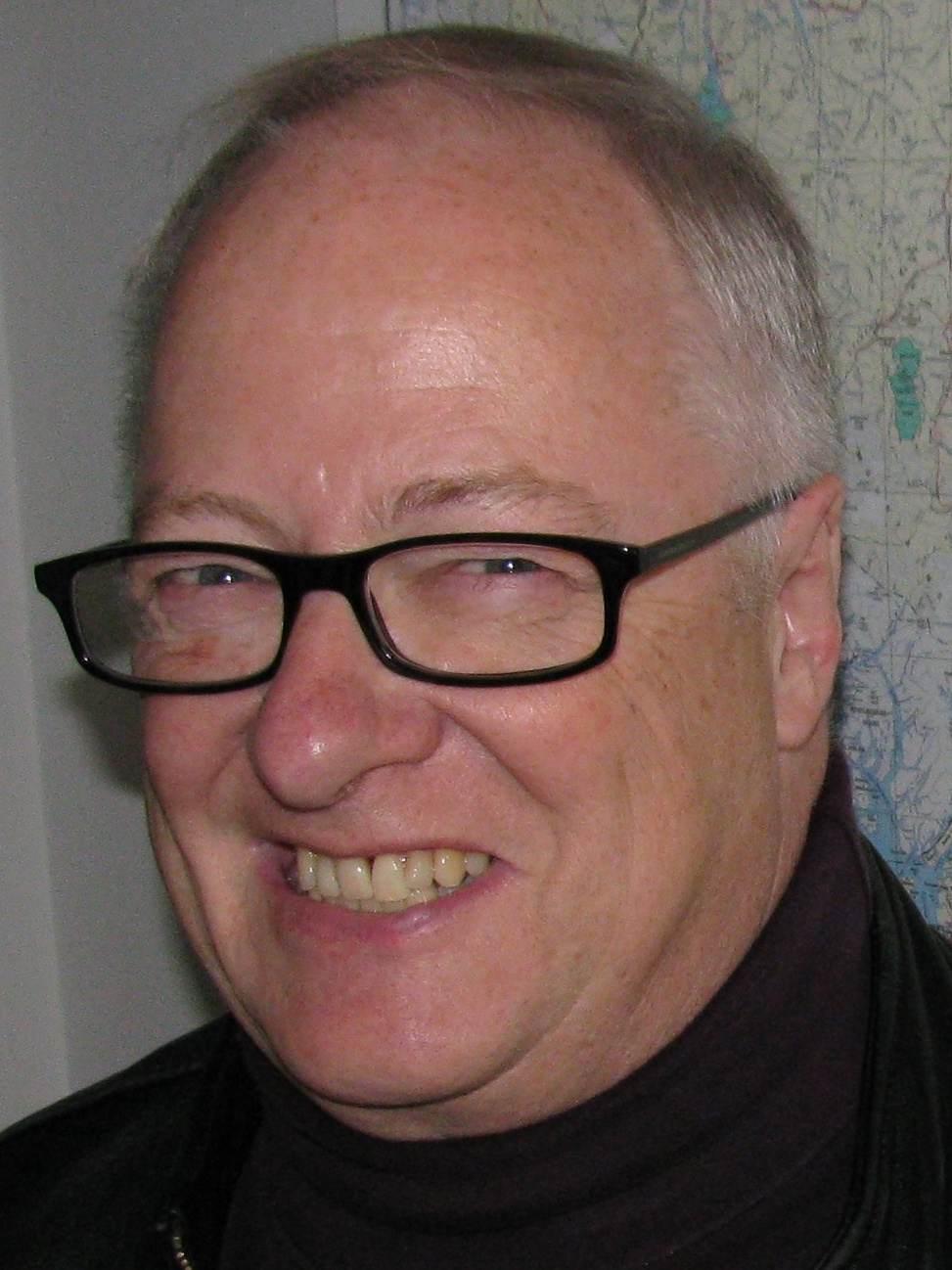
| | First party | Second party | Third party |
|---|---|---|---|
| | | PC | Lib |
| Leader | Tony Penikett | Willard Phelps | Jim McLachlan |
| Party | New Democratic | Progressive Conservative | Liberal |
| Leader since | 1981 | 1985 | 1986 |
| Leader's seat | Whitehorse West | Hootalinqua | Faro (lost re-election) |
| Last election | 8 | 6 | 2 |
| Seats won | 9 | 7 | 0 |
| Seat change | ▲1 | ▲1 | ▼2 |
| Popular vote | 5,275 | 5,172 | 1,303 |
| Percentage | 44.89% | 44.02% | 11.09% |
| Swing | ▲3.79pp | ▼2.89pp | ▲3.45pp |
- Popular vote by riding. As this is an FPTP election, seat totals are not determined by popular vote, but instead via results by each riding. Riding names are listed at the bottom.
Premier before election
Tony Penikett
New Democratic
Premier after election
Tony Penikett
New Democratic

The 1989 Yukon general election was held on 20 February 1989 to elect members of the 27th Legislative Assembly of the territory of Yukon, Canada. It was won by the New Democratic Party.

== Results by Party ==
Summary of the 1989 Legislative Assembly of Yukon election results
| Party | Party leader | Candidates | Seats | | | | Popular vote | | |
|---|---|---|---|---|---|---|---|---|---|
| Party | Party leader | Candidates | 1985 | Dissol. | 1989 | Change | # | % | Change |
| New Democratic | Tony Penikett | 16 | 8 | 9 | 9 | +1 | 5,275 | 44.89% | +3.79% |
| Progressive Conservative | Willard Phelps | 16 | 6 | 6 | 7 | +1 | 5,172 | 44.02% | -2.89% |
| Liberal | Jim McLachlan | 15 | 2 | 1 | 0 | -2 | 1,303 | 11.09% | +3.45% |
| Total | | 47 | 16 | 16 | 16 | | 11,750 | 100.00% | |

Popular vote
| New Democratic | 44.89% |
| Progressive Conservative | 44.02% |
| Liberal | 11.09% |

Seats summary
| New Democratic | 56.25% |
| Progressive Conservative | 43.75% |

== Member Changes from Previous Election ==
Changes in seats held (1985-1989)
| Seat | Before | | | | Change | | |
| Seat | Date | Member | Party | Reason | Date | Member | Party |
|---|---|---|---|---|---|---|---|
| Whitehorse Porter Creek West | September 13, 1985 | Andy Philipsen | █ PC | Death | February 10, 1986 | Alan Nordling | █ PC |
| Tatchun | October 31, 1986 | Roger Coles | █ Liberal | Resignation | February 2, 1987 | Danny Joe | █ New Democratic |

== Incumbents not Running for Reelection ==
The following MLAs had announced that they would not be running in the 1989 election:

New Democratic Party

- Dave Porter (Watson Lake)
- Roger Kimmerly (Whitehorse South Centre)

== Results by Riding ==
Bold indicates party leaders
† - denotes a retiring incumbent MLA

| Electoral district | Candidates | | | Incumbent |
| Electoral district | PC | Liberal | NDP | Incumbent |
|---|---|---|---|---|
| Campbell | Mickey Thomas; 120 | Carl Smarch; 78 | Sam Johnston; 321 | Sam Johnston |
| Faro | Mel Smith; 90 | **Jim McLachlan**; 168 | Maurice Byblow; 194 | Jim McLachlan |
| Hootalinqua | **Willard Phelps**; 541 | Rodger Thorlakson; 112 | Graham McDonald; 508 | Willard Phelps |
| Klondike | Peter Jenkins; 295 | | Art Webster; 385 | Art Webster |
| Kluane | Bill Brewster; 210 | Bill Woolsey; 37 | Ron Chambers; 183 | Bill Brewster |
| Mayo | Mike McGinnis; 93 | Wilf Tuck; 34 | Piers McDonald; 210 | Piers McDonald |
| Old Crow | Kathie Nukon; 45 | Ethel Tizya; 40 | Norma Kassi; 69 | Norma Kassi |
| Tatchun | Paul Nieman; 108 | Luke Lacasse; 71 | Danny Joe; 165 | Danny Joe |
| Watson Lake | John Devries; 298 | John McDonald; 63 | Karel Kauppinen; 295 | Dave Porter† |
| Whitehorse North Centre | Pat Joe; 155 | Don Branigan; 154 | Margaret Commodore; 251 | Margaret Commodore |
| Whitehorse Porter Creek East | Dan Lang; 606 | Patty O'Brien; 59 | Paul Harris; 292 | Dan Lang |
| Whitehorse Porter Creek West | Alan Nordling; 651 | Eldon Organ; 55 | John Wright; 392 | Alan Nordling |
| Whitehorse Riverdale North | Doug Phillips; 563 | Ray Jackson; 30 | Louis Paquet; 410 | Doug Phillips |
| Whitehorse Riverdale South | Bea Firth; 648 | Gray Jones; 79 | John Sheppard; 440 | Bea Firth |
| Whitehorse South Centre | Gerry Thick; 228 | Phil Wheelton; 163 | Joyce Hayden; 350 | Roger Kimmerly† |
| Whitehorse West | Flora Evans; 491 | Joe Jack; 160 | **Tony Penikett**; 810 | Tony Penikett |
