= 1978 Yukon general election =

Canadian territorial election

← 1974	November 20, 1978	1982 →

16 seats of the Yukon Legislative Assembly 9 seats needed for a majority
- Turnout: 70.43% (▲6.03pp)
	First party	Second party	Third party
		Lib	NDP
Leader	Hilda Watson	Iain MacKay	Fred Berger
Party	Progressive Conservative	Liberal	New Democratic
Leader since	1978	1978	1978
Leader's seat	Kluane (lost re-election)	Ran in Whitehorse Riverdale South (won)	Klondike (lost re-election)
Last election	pre-creation	pre-creation	pre-creation
Seats won	11	2	1
Seat change	▲11	▲2	▲1
Popular vote	2,869	2,201	1,568
Percentage	37.10%	28.46%	20.27%
- Popular vote by riding. As this is an FPTP election, seat totals are not determined by popular vote, but instead via results by each riding. Riding names are listed at the bottom.
Premier before election
None (position established)
Premier after election
Chris Pearson
Progressive Conservative

The 1978 Yukon general election was held on November 20, 1978, was the first conventional legislative election in the history of Canada's Yukon Territory. Prior elections were held to elect representatives to the Yukon Territorial Council, a non-partisan body that acted in an advisory role to the Commissioner of the Yukon. Following the passage of the Yukon Elections Act in 1977, the 1978 election was the first time that voters in the Yukon elected representatives to the Yukon Legislative Assembly in an election organized along political party lines.

Hilda Watson, the first woman ever to lead a political party into an election in Canada, was the leader of the Progressive Conservatives. Although the party won the election, Watson herself was defeated in Kluane by Liberal candidate Alice McGuire, and thus did not become government leader. The position of government leader instead went to Chris Pearson.

New Democratic leader Fred Berger was also defeated in his own riding. He remained leader of the party until 1981, when he was succeeded by the party's sole elected MLA, Tony Penikett. Under Penikett's leadership, an MLA who had been elected as an independent in 1978 joined the NDP, and the party won a by-election. With its caucus increased to three members, the NDP had thus supplanted the Liberals as the official opposition by the time of the 1982 election.

== Results by Party ==
Summary of the 1978 Legislative Assembly of Yukon election results
Party	Party leader	Candidates	Seats				Popular vote		
Party	Party leader	Candidates	1974	Dissol.	1978	Change	#	%	Change
Progressive Conservative	Hilda Watson	15	0	0	11	+11	2,869	37.10%	N/A
Liberal	Iain MacKay	14	0	0	2	+2	2,201	28.46%	N/A
Independent		9	12	12	2	-10	1,096	14.17%	N/A
New Democratic	Fred Berger	14	0	0	1	+1	1,568	20.27%	N/A
Total		52	12	12	16	+4	7,734	100.00%	

Popular vote
Progressive Conservative	37.10%
Liberal	28.46%
New Democratic	20.27%
Independent	14.17%

Seats summary
Progressive Conservative	68.75%
Liberal	12.50%
Independent	12.50%
New Democratic	6.25%

== Incumbents not Running for Reelection ==
The following MLAs had announced that they would not be running in the 1978 election:

Independent

- Flo Whyard (Whitehorse West)
- Willard Phelps (Whitehorse Riverdale)

== Results by Riding ==
Bold indicates party leaders
† - denotes a retiring incumbent MLA

Electoral district	Candidates				Incumbent
Electoral district	PC	Liberal	NDP	Independent	Incumbent
Campbell	Don McIntosh; 61	Blake Stirling Macdonald; 120	Margaret Thomson; 65	Robert Fleming; 184	New District
Faro			Stuart McCall; 231	Maurice Byblow; 361	New District
Hootalinqua	Al Falle; 209	Mike Laforet; 83	Max Fraser; 159	Mack Henry; 44	Robert Fleming
Klondike	Meg McCall; 152		**Fred Berger**; 130	Eleanor Millard; 114	Fred Berger
Kluane	**Hilda Watson**; 150	Alice McGuire; 188		John Livesey; 49	Hilda Watson
Mayo	Swede Hanson; 95	Gordon McIntyre; 84	Alan McDiarmid; 82	David Harwood; 85	Gordon McIntyre
Old Crow	Grafton Njootli; 62	Edith Tizya; 29	Robert Bruce; 19		New District
Tatchun	Howard Tracey; 109	Hugh Netzel; 71	Jerry Roberts; 83		New District
Watson Lake	Don Taylor; 226	Grant Taylor; 188			Don Taylor
Whitehorse North Centre	Geoff Lattin; 153	Dermot Flynn; 83	Doug Stephenson; 131	Ken McKinnon; 141	Ken McKinnon
Whitehorse Porter Creek East	Dan Lang; 322	Bill Webber; 202	Paul Warner; 84		New District
Whitehorse Porter Creek West	Doug Graham; 188	Clive Tanner; 142	Kathy Horton; 60		New District
Whitehorse Riverdale North	Chris Pearson; 358	Richard Rotondo; 194	Dave Dornian; 59		New District
Whitehorse Riverdale South	Margaret Heath; 354	**Iain MacKay**; 420	Jim McCullough; 113		New District
Whitehorse South Centre	Jack Hibberd; 245	Bert Law; 197	Ken Krocker; 122		Jack Hibberd
Whitehorse West	Anthony Fekete; 185	John Watt; 200	Tony Penikett; 230	Al Omotani; 81; Guy Julien; 37	Flo Whyard†

== Aftermath ==
After the election, four of the elected members in the Progressive Conservative Party, including Chris Pearson, were added to the Executive Committee headed by Commissioner Art Pearson. In October 1979, at the instruction of Jake Epp, Federal Minister of Indian Affairs and Northern Development, the Commissioner withdrew from direct government administration; Chris Pearson became Government Leader (equal to Premier), added a fifth member of the PC Party caucus, and formed the Executive Council of Yukon, thus beginning responsible government with an elected head of government in The Yukon. Art Pearson would later resign as Commissioner after pleading guilty to charges related to improper mining claim transfers and was replaced with Frank Fingland.
