= 27th Legislature of Yukon =

Legislature of Yukon, Canada, 1989–1992

The 27th Yukon Legislative Assembly convened in 1989. The NDP government led by Tony Penikett re-elected with a majority government.

== Membership in the 27th Assembly ==
The following members were elected to the 27th Yukon Legislative Assembly in the general election of 1989:

Member	Party	Electoral district	First elected / previously elected	No. of terms
Sam Johnston	NDP	Campbell	1985	2nd term
Maurice Byblow	NDP	Faro	1978, (Note: First elected as Independent) 1989	2nd term*
Willard Phelps	Progressive Conservative	Hootalinqua	1974, (Note: Whitehorse Riverdale) 1985	3rd term*
Willard Phelps	Independent Alliance	Hootalinqua	1974, 1985	3rd term*
Art Webster	NDP	Klondike	1985	2nd term
Bill Brewster	Progressive Conservative	Kluane	1982	3rd term
Bill Brewster	Yukon Party	Kluane	1982	3rd term
Piers McDonald	NDP	Mayo	1982	3rd term
Norma Kassi	NDP	Old Crow	1985	2nd term
Danny Joe	NDP	Tatchun	1987	2nd term
John Devries	Progressive Conservative	Watson Lake	1989	1st term
John Devries	Yukon Party	Watson Lake	1989	1st term
Margaret Commodore	NDP	Whitehorse North Centre	1982	3rd term
Daniel Lang	Progressive Conservative	Whitehorse Porter Creek East	1974	5th term
Daniel Lang	Yukon Party	Whitehorse Porter Creek East	1974	5th term
Alan Nordling	Progressive Conservative	Whitehorse Porter Creek West	1986	2nd term
Alan Nordling	Independent Alliance	Whitehorse Porter Creek West	1986	2nd term
Doug Phillips	Progressive Conservative	Whitehorse Riverdale North	1985	2nd term
Doug Phillips	Yukon Party	Whitehorse Riverdale North	1985	2nd term
Bea Firth	Progressive Conservative	Whitehorse Riverdale South	1982	3rd term
Bea Firth	Independent Alliance	Whitehorse Riverdale South	1982	3rd term
Joyce Hayden	NDP	Whitehorse South Centre	1989	1st term
Tony Penikett	NDP	Whitehorse West	1978	4th term
