= 25th Legislature of Yukon =

Legislature of Yukon, Canada, 1982–1985

The 25th Yukon Legislative Assembly convened in 1982,Progressive Conservative Government led by Chris Pearson was re-elected with a majority

== Membership in the 25th Assembly ==
The following members were elected to the 25th Yukon Legislative Assembly in the general election of 1982:

Member	Party	Electoral district	First elected / previously elected	No. of terms
Dave Porter	NDP	Campbell	1982	1st term
Maurice Byblow	NDP	Faro	1978	2nd term
Al Falle	Progressive Conservative	Hootalinqua	1978	2nd term
Clarke Ashley	Progressive Conservative	Klondike	1982	1st term
Bill Brewster	Progressive Conservative	Kluane	1982	1st term
Piers McDonald	NDP	Mayo	1982	1st term
Kathie Nukon	Progressive Conservative	Old Crow	1982	1st term
Howard Tracey	Progressive Conservative	Tatchun	1978	2nd term
Don Taylor	Independent	Watson Lake	1961	7th term
Margaret Commodore	NDP	Whitehorse North Centre	1982	1st term
Daniel Lang	Progressive Conservative	Whitehorse Porter Creek East	1974	3rd term
Andy Philipsen	Progressive Conservative	Whitehorse Porter Creek West	1982	1st term
Chris Pearson	Progressive Conservative	Whitehorse Riverdale North	1978	2nd term
Bea Firth	Progressive Conservative	Whitehorse Riverdale South	1982	1st term
Roger Kimmerly	NDP	Whitehorse South Centre	1981	2nd term
Tony Penikett	NDP	Whitehorse West	1978	2nd term
