= 26th Legislature of Yukon =

Legislature of Yukon, Canada, 1985–1989

The 26th Yukon Legislative Assembly convened in 1985. The NDP led by Tony Penikett was formed minority government.

== Membership in the 26th Assembly ==
The following members were elected to the 26th Yukon Legislative Assembly in the general election of 1985:

Member	Party	Electoral district	First elected / previously elected	No. of terms
Sam Johnston	NDP	Campbell	1985	1st term
Jim McLachlan	Liberal	Faro	1985	1st term
Willard Phelps	Progressive Conservative	Hootalinqua	1974, (Note: Whitehorse Riverdale) 1985	2nd term*
Art Webster	NDP	Klondike	1985	1st term
Bill Brewster	Progressive Conservative	Kluane	1982	2nd term
Piers McDonald	NDP	Mayo	1982	2nd term
Norma Kassi	NDP	Old Crow	1985	1st term
Roger Coles	Liberal	Tatchun	1985	1st term
Danny Joe (1987)	NDP	Tatchun	1987	1st term
Dave Porter	NDP	Watson Lake	1982	2nd term
Margaret Commodore	NDP	Whitehorse North Centre	1982	2nd term
Daniel Lang	Progressive Conservative	Whitehorse Porter Creek East	1974	4th term
Andy Philipsen	Progressive Conservative	Whitehorse Porter Creek West	1982	2nd term
Alan Nordling (1986)	Progressive Conservative	Whitehorse Porter Creek West	1986	1st term
Doug Phillips	Progressive Conservative	Whitehorse Riverdale North	1985	1st term
Bea Firth	Progressive Conservative	Whitehorse Riverdale South	1982	2nd term
Roger Kimmerly	NDP	Whitehorse South Centre	1981	3rd term
Tony Penikett	NDP	Whitehorse West	1978	3rd term

=== Membership changes ===
Changes in seats held (1985–1989)
Seat	Before				Change		
Seat	Date	Member	Party	Reason	Date	Member	Party
Whitehorse Porter Creek West	September 13, 1985	Andy Philipsen	█ PC	Death	February 10, 1986	Alan Nordling	█ PC
Tatchun	October 31, 1986	Roger Coles	█ Liberal	Resignation	February 2, 1987	Danny Joe	█ New Democratic

== By-elections ==
2 by-elections was held in the districts of Whitehorse Porter Creek West and Tatchun in 1986 and 1987.

Electoral district	Member elected	Affiliation	Election date	Reason
Whitehorse Porter Creek West	Alan Nordling	Progressive Conservative	February 10, 1986	Death
Tatchun	Danny Joe	NDP	February 2, 1987	Resignation after pleading guilty to cocaine trafficking, and was sentenced to three years in prison.
