= 1992 Yukon general election =

Canadian territorial election

← 1989	October 19, 1992	1996 →

17 seats of the Yukon Legislative Assembly 9 seats needed for a majority
- Turnout: 77.54% (▲0.47pp)
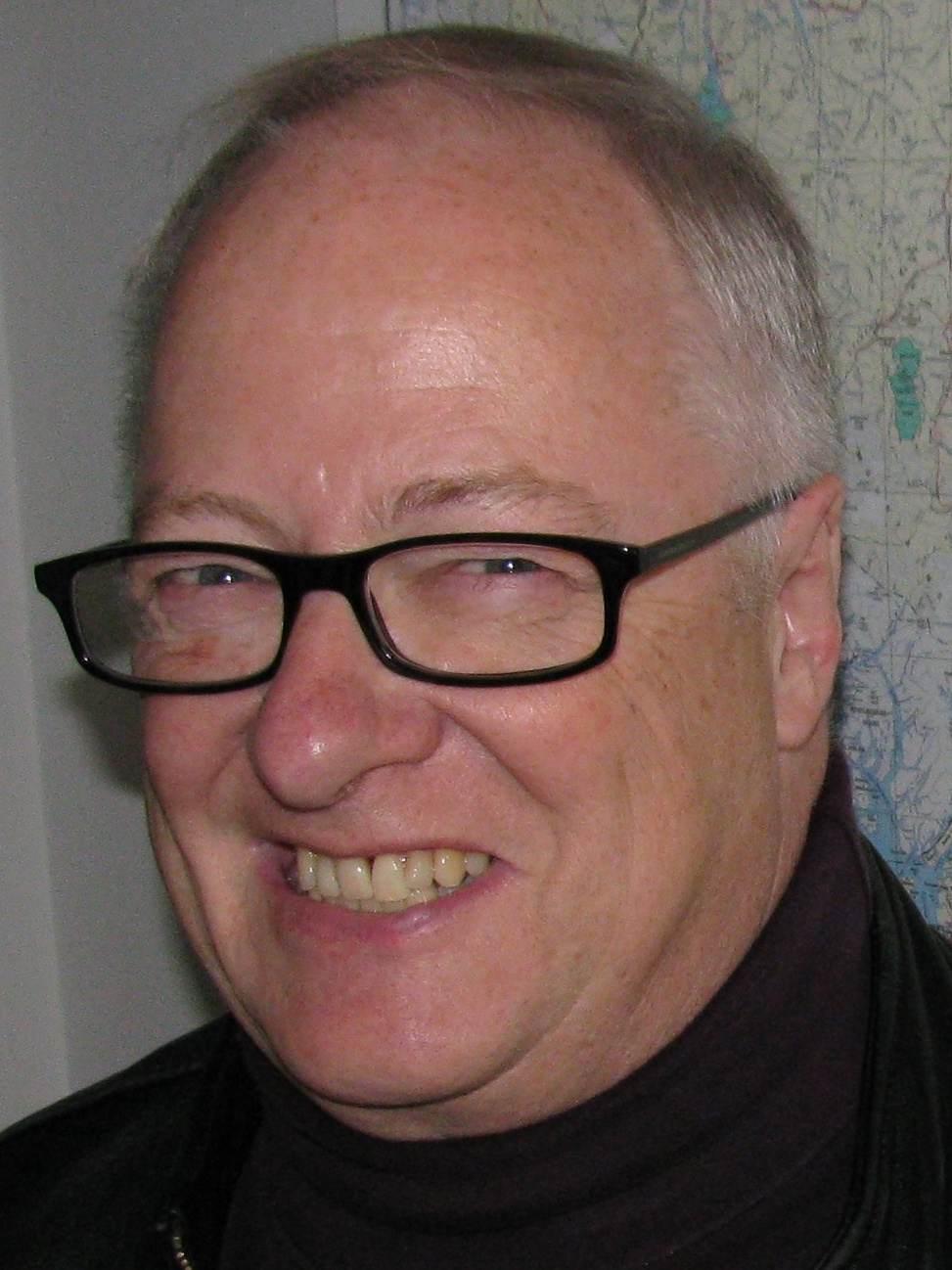
	First party	Second party	Third party
	YP		LIB
Leader	John Ostashek	Tony Penikett	Paul Thériault
Party	Yukon Party	New Democratic	Liberal
Leader since	1991	1981	1992
Leader's seat	Porter Creek North	Whitehorse West	Ran in Riverdale South (lost)
Last election	7	9	0
Seats won	7	6	1
Seat change	0	▼3	▲1
Popular vote	4,675	4,571	2,098
Percentage	35.88%	35.08%	16.10%
Swing	▼8.14pp	▼9.81pp	▲5.01pp
- Popular vote by riding. As this is an FPTP election, seat totals are not determined by popular vote, but instead by the result in each riding. Riding names are listed at the bottom.
Premier before election
Tony Penikett
New Democratic
Premier after election
John Ostashek
Yukon Party

The 1992 Yukon general election was held on October 19, 1992 to elect members of the 28th Legislative Assembly of the territory of Yukon, Canada. It was won by the Yukon Party.

== Results by party ==
Summary of the 1992 Legislative Assembly of Yukon election results
Party	Party leader	Candidates	Seats				Popular vote		
Party	Party leader	Candidates	1989	Dissol.	1992	Change	#	%	Change
Yukon Party	John Ostashek	14	7	7	7	0	4,675	35.88%	-8.14%
New Democratic	Tony Penikett	17	9	9	6	-3	4,571	35.08%	-9.81%
Independent		7	0	0	3	+3	1,686	12.94%	N/A
Liberal	Paul Thériault	14	0	0	1	+1	2,098	16.10%	+5.01%
Total		52	16	16	17	+1	13,030	100.00%	

Popular vote
Yukon Party	35.88%
New Democratic	35.08%
Liberal	16.10%
Independent	12.94%

Seats summary
Yukon Party	41.18%
New Democratic	35.29%
Independent	17.65%
Liberal	5.88%

== Incumbents not Running for Reelection ==
The following MLAs had announced that they would not be running in the 1992 election:

New Democratic Party

- Maurice Byblow (Faro)
- Norma Kassi (Vuntut Gwitchin)

Yukon Party

- Dan Lang (Whitehorse Porter Creek East)

== Riding Results ==
Bold indicates party leaders
† - denotes a retiring incumbent MLA

Electoral district	Candidates				Incumbent
Electoral district	Yukon	Liberal	NDP	Other	Incumbent
Faro		Jim McLachlan; 337	Trevor Harding; 388		Maurice Byblow†
Klondike	David Millar; 409		Art Webster; 355		Art Webster
Kluane	Bill Brewster; 377		Wolf Riedl; 256		Bill Brewster
Lake Laberge	Mickey Fisher; 345	Bonnie Hurlock; 210	Sandra Gibbs; 192	Chris Gladish; 223	New District
McIntyre-Takhini	Scott Howell; 290	Larry Bill; 126	Piers McDonald; 313		New District
Mayo-Tatchun	Si Mason-Wood; 264	Roddy Blackjack; 99	Danny Joe; 297		New District
Mount Lorne	Chuck Walker; 302	Roger Moore; 89	Lois Moorcroft; 316	Barb Harris; 202	New District
Porter Creek North	**John Ostashek**; 474	Eldon Organ; 125	Carl Rumscheidt; 301		New District
Porter Creek South		Shayne Fairman; 261	Brian McLaughlin; 240	Alan Nordling; 435	New District
Riverdale North	Doug Phillips; 557	Lesley Cabott; 106	Lucy Van Oldenbarneveld; 292		Doug Phillips
Riverdale South	Dale Stokes; 293	**Paul Thériault**; 48	Maurice Byblow; 242	Bea Firth; 384	Bea Firth
Riverside	Nancy Huston; 265	Jack Cable; 291	Joyce Hayden; 212		New District
Ross River-Southern Lakes		Jim Smarch; 45	Sam Johnston; 234	Willard Phelps; 338; Timothy Cant; 92	New District
Vuntut Gwitchin	Johnny Abel; 96		Grafton Njootli; 56		Norma Kassi†
Watson Lake	John Devries; 485	Ron Lutz; 56	Karel Kauppinen; 285		John Devries
Whitehorse Centre	Chuck Rear; 286	Phil Wheelton; 191	Margaret Commodore; 288		Margaret Commodore
Whitehorse West	Bob Bruneau; 232	Shaun Patrick Dennehy; 114	**Tony Penikett**; 304	Bernd Schmidt; 12	Tony Penikett
