= List of leaders of the opposition of Yukon =

This is a list of the leaders of the opposition of the Yukon Territory, Canada, since the introduction of territorial political parties in 1978 and the establishment of responsible government in 1979. Prior to 1978 the territory had a legislature which had a largely advisory role and no political parties or government leader. Instead powers were invested in a governing commissioner appointed by the federal government.

Name	Took office	Left office	Party
Iain MacKay	1978	1981	Liberal
Tony Penikett	1981	1985	NDP
Willard Phelps	1985	1991	Progressive Conservative
Daniel Lang	1991	1992	Yukon Party**
Tony Penikett	1992	1995	NDP
Piers McDonald	1995	1996	NDP
John Ostashek	1996	1999	Yukon Party
Pat Duncan	1999	2000	Liberal
Trevor Harding	2000	2000	NDP
Eric Fairclough	2001	2002	NDP
Todd Hardy	2002	2006	NDP
Arthur Mitchell	2006	2011	Liberal
Liz Hanson	2011	2016	NDP
Stacey Hassard	2016	2021	Yukon Party
Currie Dixon	2021	2025	Yukon Party
Kate White	2025		NDP

**In 1992, the Progressive Conservative Party in the Yukon changed its name to the Yukon Party.

== See also ==
- List of Yukon commissioners
- Lists of incumbents
- List of premiers of Yukon
