= Whitehorse South Centre =

Former territorial electoral district in the Yukon, Canada

Yukon electoral district

Defunct territorial electoral district
- Legislature: Yukon Legislative Assembly
- First contested: 1974
- Last contested: 1989

Demographics
- Census subdivision: Whitehorse

Whitehorse South Centre was a territorial electoral district in Yukon. Serving the city of Whitehorse, the district elected one member to the Yukon Territorial Council from 1974 to 1978, and to the Yukon Legislative Assembly from 1978 to 1992.

== Members ==
| Parliament | Years | Member | Party |
|---|---|---|---|
| 23rd | 1974–1978 | Jack Hibberd | Independent |
| 24th | 1978–1981 | Jack Hibberd | Progressive Conservative |
| 24th | 1981–1982 | Roger Kimmerly | New Democratic Party |
| 25th | 1982–1985 | Roger Kimmerly | New Democratic Party |
| 26th | 1985–1989 | Roger Kimmerly | New Democratic Party |
| 27th | 1989–1992 | Joyce Hayden | New Democratic Party |

== Election results ==
1974 Yukon general election
| Party | Candidate | Votes | % | ±% |
|---|---|---|---|---|
| Independent | Jack Hibberd | 267 | | |
| Independent | Tony Penikett | 143 | | |
| Independent | Ron Veale | 130 | | |
| Total | | | | |

1978 Yukon general election
| Party | Candidate | Votes | % | ±% |
|---|---|---|---|---|
| Progressive Conservative | Jack Hibberd | 245 | 43.44 | |
| Liberal | Bert Law | 197 | 34.93 | |
| NDP | Ken Krocker | 122 | 21.63 | |
| Total valid votes | | 564 | 100 | |
| Total rejected ballots | | 3 | 0.53 | |
| Turnout | | 567 | 62.24 | |
| Registered voters | | 911 | | |
Source: Canadian Elections Database

By-election, October 13, 1981 Resignation of Jack Hibberd
| Party | Candidate | Votes | % | ±% |
|---|---|---|---|---|
| NDP | Roger Kimmerly | 203 | | |
| Progressive Conservative | Neil Hayes | 127 | | |
| Liberal | Mimi Stehelin | 116 | | |
| Independent | Chuck Rear | 97 | | |
| Total | | | | |

1982 Yukon general election
| Party | Candidate | Votes | % | ±% |
|---|---|---|---|---|
| NDP | Roger Kimmerly | 328 | 43.39 | |
| Progressive Conservative | Chuck Rear | 320 | 42.33 | |
| Liberal | Carol Christian | 108 | 14.29 | |
| Total valid votes | | 756 | 100 | |
| Total rejected ballots | | 5 | 0.66 | |
| Turnout | | 761 | 78.13 | |
| Registered voters | | 974 | | |
Source: Canadian Elections Database

1985 Yukon general election
| Party | Candidate | Votes | % | ±% |
|---|---|---|---|---|
| NDP | Roger Kimmerly | 346 | 47.14 | |
| Progressive Conservative | Ron Granger | 303 | 41.28 | |
| Liberal | Arthur Giovinazzo | 85 | 11.58 | |
| Total valid votes | | 734 | 100 | |
| Total rejected ballots | | 4 | 0.54 | |
| Turnout | | 738 | 76.32 | |
| Registered voters | | 967 | | |
Source: Canadian Elections Database

1989 Yukon general election
| Party | Candidate | Votes | % | ±% |
|---|---|---|---|---|
| NDP | Joyce Hayden | 350 | 47.23 | |
| Progressive Conservative | Gerry Thick | 228 | 30.77 | |
| Liberal | Phil Wheelton | 163 | 22.00 | |
| Total valid votes | | 741 | 100 | |
| Total rejected ballots | | 4 | 0.53 | |
| Turnout | | 745 | 75.25 | |
| Registered voters | | 990 | | |
Source: Canadian Elections Database

== See also ==
- List of Yukon territorial electoral districts
- Canadian provincial electoral districts
