= John Devries =

John Devries may refer to:

- John Devries (Yukon politician) (born 1945), a politician in the Yukon, Canada
- John DeVries (1915–1992), American lyricist
- John de Vries (born 1966), Australian racing driver
