= Faro (Canadian electoral district) =

Former territorial electoral district in the Yukon, Canada

Yukon electoral district

Defunct territorial electoral district
- Legislature: Yukon Legislative Assembly
- District created: 1978
- District abolished: 2002
- First contested: 1978
- Last contested: 2000

Demographics
- Electors (2000): 234
- Census subdivision: Faro

Faro was an electoral district that returned a member (known as an MLA) to the Legislative Assembly of the Yukon Territory in Canada between 1978 and 2002. It was created out of the riding of Pelly River and encompassed the community of Faro. It was situated on the historical territory of the Ross River Dena Council of the Kaska Dena.

The riding was dissolved in 2002 and amalgamated into the new riding of Pelly-Nisutlin, which includes the communities of Faro, Teslin, Ross River, and Little Salmon.

Faro is the former seat of Yukon Liberal leader Jim McLachlan and New Democrat Trevor Harding, who briefly served as interim leader of the Yukon New Democratic Party and interim Leader of the Official Opposition after his party's defeat in the 2000 territorial election.

== History ==
When partisan politics were first introduced to the Yukon, Faro was one of the territory's nine rural seats. Originally bordered by the ridings of Tatchun and Campbell, at the time of its dissolution it was bordered by the ridings of Mayo-Tatchun and Ross River-Southern Lakes.

Faro is the home of the Faro Mine, at one point the largest open pit lead–zinc mine in the world as well as a significant producer of silver and other natural resource ventures. At its peak in 1982, the community was home to 2,100 residents, but at the time of the riding's dissolution, the community of Faro was home to just 400 people. When the Faro Mine's operators announced the indefinite closure of the operation, the effect devastated the territorial economy, as it represented approximately 40% of territorial GDP. Several corporations sought to restart the Faro Mine, but the final attempt, that of Anvil Range Mining Corporation, ceased in January 1998, followed by the bankruptcy of Anvil Range.

Faro continued to shrink in population as a community as the successive mining operations went under. In 2002, the Yukon Electoral District Boundaries Commission ruled that Faro's population had fallen far below acceptable levels to merit its own riding. The riding of Faro was dissolved and the community of Faro joined the communities of Teslin, Ross River, and Little Salmon to form the new riding of Pelly-Nisutlin.

== MLAs ==
Legislature	Years	Member	Party
24th	1978–1981	Maurice Byblow	Independent
24th	1981–1982	Maurice Byblow	NDP
25th	1982–1985	Maurice Byblow	NDP
26th	1985–1989	Jim McLachlan	Liberal
27th	1989–1992	Maurice Byblow	NDP
28th	1992–1996	Trevor Harding	NDP
29th	1996–2000	Trevor Harding	NDP
30th	2000-2000	Trevor Harding	NDP
30th	2000–2002	Jim McLachlan	Liberal

== Electoral results ==
=== 2000 by-election ===
2000 By-election
Party	Candidate	Votes	%	±%
Liberal	Jim McLachlan	129	65.5%	+42.6%
NDP	Harold Boehm	66	33.5%	-43.1%
Total		197	100.0%	–

- On the resignation of Trevor Harding (2000).

=== 2000 ===
2000 Yukon general election
Party	Candidate	Votes	%	±%
NDP	Trevor Harding	177	76.6%	-17.7%
Liberal	Jim McLachlan	53	22.9%	+17.7%
Total		231	100.0%	–

=== 1996 ===
1996 Yukon general election
Party	Candidate	Votes	%	±%
NDP	Trevor Harding	530	94.3%	+41.1%
Liberal	Ed Peake	29	5.2%	-41.0%
Total		562	100.0%	–

=== 1992 ===
1992 Yukon general election
Party	Candidate	Votes	%	±%
NDP	Trevor Harding	388	53.2%	+10.4%
Liberal	Jim McLachlan	337	46.2%	+9.1%
Total		729	100.0%	–

=== 1989 ===
1989 Yukon general election
Party	Candidate	Votes	%	±%
NDP	Maurice Byblow	194	42.8%	+9.3%
Liberal	Jim McLachlan	168	37.1%	-2.2%
Progressive Conservative	Mel Smith	90	19.9%	-7.0%
Total		453	100.0%	–

=== 1985 ===
1985 Yukon general election
Party	Candidate	Votes	%	±%
Liberal	Jim McLachlan	142	39.3%	+17.1%
NDP	Sibyl Frei	121	33.5%	-15.8%
Progressive Conservative	Ted Bartsch	97	26.9%	-1.4%
Total		361	100.0%	–

=== 1982 ===
1982 Yukon general election
Party	Candidate	Votes	%	±%
NDP	Maurice Byblow	357	49.3%	+10.4%
Progressive Conservative	Doris Gates	205	28.3%	+28.3%
Liberal	Wayne Peace	160	22.1%	+22.1%
Total		724	100.0%	–

=== 1978 ===
1978 Yukon general election
Party	Candidate	Votes	%	±%
Independent	Maurice Byblow	361	60.1%	–
NDP	Stuart McCall	231	38.9%	–
Total		594	100.0%	–

== See also ==
- List of Yukon territorial electoral districts
- Canadian provincial electoral districts
