= Patti McLeod =

Canadian politician

Patti McLeod MLA

Speaker of the Yukon Legislative Assembly
- In office May 10, 2016 – January 12, 2017
- Preceded by: David Laxton
- Succeeded by: Nils Clarke

Member of the Yukon Legislative Assembly for Watson Lake-Ross River-Faro Watson Lake, 2011—2025
- Incumbent
- Assumed office October 11, 2011
- Preceded by: Dennis Fentie

Personal details
- Party: Yukon Party

Patti McLeod is a Canadian politician, who was elected to in the Yukon Legislative Assembly in the 2011 election. She represents the electoral district of Watson Lake-Ross River-Faro, formerly known as Watson Lake, as a member of the Yukon Party caucus.

== Political career ==
=== 33rd Legislative Assembly ===
She was first elected as MLA of Watson Lake on October 11, 2011, succeeding former Yukon Premier Dennis Fentie.

During her first term in office, she served as Deputy Speaker and Chair of Committee of the Whole, as well as the Chair of the Select Committee on Whistle-blower Protection, the Select Committee Regarding the Risks and Benefits of Hydraulic Fracturing, and the Standing Committee on Elections and Privileges. Additionally, she was appointed to the Standing Committee on Appointments to Major Government Boards and Committees, the Standing Committee on Rules, the Standing Committee on Public Accounts, and the Standing Committee on Statutory Instruments.

On May 10, 2016, McLeod was elected as the 11th Speaker of the Yukon Legislative Assembly, following the resignation of incumbent Speaker David Laxton. Upon her election as Speaker, Ms. McLeod became Chair of the Members’ Services Board.

She is the first female Speaker of the Yukon Legislative Assembly and served in that capacity until January 2017.

=== 34th Legislative Assembly ===
McLeod was re-elected as MLA of Watson Lake on November 7, 2016, when the Yukon Party was defeated by the Yukon Liberal Party. She is currently the Official Opposition critic for the Department of Health and Social Services, the Women's Directorate, and the Yukon Workers’ Compensation Health and Safety Board. McLeod is currently also a member of the Standing Committee on Statutory Instruments and the Standing Committee on Appointments to Major Government Boards and Committees.

=== 35th Legislative Assembly ===
In the 35th Legislature of Yukon, McLeod served as the Official Opposition critic for Community Services and the Yukon Workers' Compensation Health and Safety Board.

== Personal life ==
Prior to entering territorial politics, she worked in mining administration for the federal and territorial governments. She is a former elected member of the Watson Lake town council and used to work for the Watson Lake Chamber of Commerce.

== Electoral record ==
2025 Yukon general election: Watson Lake-Ross River-Faro
Party	Candidate	Votes	%	±%
Yukon Party	Patti McLeod	409	53.19	-0.52
New Democratic	Josie O’Brien	285	37.06	+21.63
Liberal	Lael Lund	75	9.75	-21.11
Total valid votes		769		
Total rejected ballots				
Turnout			43.45	
Eligible voters		1,770		
Yukon Party hold		Swing		-11.07
Source(s) "2025 General Election Official Results". Elections Yukon.

2021 Yukon general election: Watson Lake
Party	Candidate	Votes	%	±%
Yukon Party	Patti McLeod	313	56.9	+18.0
Liberal	Amanda Brown	237	43.1	+15.5
Total valid votes		550		
Total rejected ballots		11		
Turnout		561	56.0	
Eligible voters		1,002		
Yukon Party hold		Swing		+1.2
Source(s) "Official Election Results 2021" (PDF). Elections Yukon.

=== 2016 general election ===
Watson Lake
Party	Candidate	Votes	%	±%
Yukon Party	Patti McLeod	299	38.9%	+1.8%
NDP	Erin Labonte	219	28.5%	-4.6%
Liberal	Ernie Jamieson	212	27.6%	+5.0%
Independent	Victor Kisoun	38	5.0%	-1.6%
Total		768	100.0%	–

=== 2011 general election ===
Watson Lake
Party	Candidate	Votes	%	±%
Yukon Party	Patti McLeod	276	37.8%	-26.9%
NDP	Liard McMillan	242	33.1%	+27.3%
Liberal	Thomas Slager	165	22.6%	-3.0%
Independent	Patricia Gilhooly	48	6.6%	+6.6%
Total		731	100.0%	–
