= Swede Hanson (politician) =

Canadian politician

Member of the Legislative Assembly of Yukon
- In office 1978–1982
- Preceded by: Gordon McIntyre
- Succeeded by: Piers McDonald
- Constituency: Mayo

Personal details
- Born: Peter Hanson; August 22, 1925 Montreal, Quebec
- Died: September 17, 1986 (aged 61) Whitehorse, Yukon
- Party: Progressive Conservative

Peter (Swede) Hanson (August 22, 1925 - September 17, 1986) was a Canadian politician, who served as a member of the Legislative Assembly of Yukon from 1978 to 1982. He represented the electoral district of Mayo as a member of the Yukon Progressive Conservative Party, and served in the Executive Council of Yukon as minister of consumer and corporate affairs, tourism, economic development and renewable resources in the government of Chris Pearson.

Born and raised in Montreal, Quebec, Hanson served in Canada's Black Watch Regiment during World War II. He moved to Yukon following the war and settled in Mayo, where he worked as a miner, trapper and prospector before becoming foreman of the town's public works department. By the time of his decision to run in the 1978 Yukon general election, Hanson was so well known in Mayo that he only half-jokingly ran on the theme that he did not need to actually conduct a campaign.

He was elected in the 1978 Yukon general election, defeating former territorial councillor Gordon McIntyre. The result was subject to an automatic recount due to his narrow margin of victory, but the recount confirmed his victory. Once the transfer of executive power from the Commissioner of Yukon to the Legislative Assembly was finalized, he was named to Pearson's new cabinet in 1979; however, he resigned the position in May 1980 following a dispute over First Nations hunting rights in the Kluane National Park and Reserve. He was later appointed as chair of the legislature's first select committee to debate and discuss improvements to its new wildlife management legislation.

He was defeated in the 1982 Yukon general election by Piers McDonald of the Yukon New Democratic Party, and retired from politics thereafter.

He died on September 17, 1986, in Whitehorse.

== Electoral record ==
1978 Yukon general election
| Party | Candidate | Votes | % | ±% |
|---|---|---|---|---|
| Progressive Conservative | Swede Hanson | 95 | 26.8% | – |
| Independent | David Harwood | 85 | 23.7% | – |
| Liberal | Gordon McIntyre | 84 | 24.0% | – |
| NDP | Alan H. McDiarmid | 82 | 23.2% | – |
| Total | | 354 | 100.0% | – |

1982 Yukon general election
| Party | Candidate | Votes | % | ±% |
|---|---|---|---|---|
| NDP | Piers McDonald | 230 | 52.3% | +29.1% |
| Progressive Conservative | Swede Hanson | 173 | 39.3% | +12.5% |
| Liberal | Eleanor Van Bibber | 35 | 8.0% | -16.0% |
| Total | | 440 | 100.0% | – |
