= Geoff Lattin =

Canadian politician (1920–1992)

MLA for Whitehorse North Centre
- In office 1978–1982
- Preceded by: Ken McKinnon
- Succeeded by: Margaret Commodore

Personal details
- Born: May 9, 1920 Edmonton, Alberta
- Died: July 24, 1992 (aged 72)
- Party: Progressive Conservative
- Occupation: hotel manager, businessman

Edward Geoffrey Lattin (May 9, 1920 – July 24, 1992) was a Canadian politician, who represented the electoral district of Whitehorse North Centre in the Legislative Assembly of Yukon from 1978 to 1982 as a member of the Yukon Progressive Conservative Party.

Born in Edmonton, Alberta in 1920, Lattin moved to Yukon in 1952. He worked as a railway foreman for several years until he and his brother Con bought Northland Beverages, a local soft drink distributor in 1958; they subsequently also purchased Whitehorse's Fort Yukon Hotel, where Lattin was manager until his election to the legislature. He was also an unsuccessful candidate for Whitehorse City Council in a by-election in 1976.

First elected in the 1978 Yukon general election, he suffered a heart attack in the legislative assembly in April 1979. He was appointed to the Executive Council of Yukon as Minister of Municipal and Community Affairs in 1980. He was admitted to hospital in December 1981 with chest pains from a suspected second heart attack, but was not considered to be in serious condition as he had been able to drive himself to the hospital. He held the cabinet role until the 1982 Yukon general election, in which he was defeated by Margaret Commodore of the Yukon New Democratic Party. He died on July 24, 1992, from a heart attack.
