= Robert Fleming (Canadian politician) =

Canadian politician (1918–1985)

Member of the Yukon Territorial Council
- In office 1974–1978
- Preceded by: first member
- Succeeded by: Al Falle
- Constituency: Hootalinqua

Member of the Legislative Assembly of Yukon
- In office 1978–1982
- Preceded by: first member
- Succeeded by: Dave Porter
- Constituency: Campbell

Personal details
- Born: November 13, 1918 Peace River, Alberta
- Died: February 15, 1985 (aged 66) Chilliwack, British Columbia
- Party: Independent (1974-1981); Progressive Conservative (1981-1982)

Robert Fleming (1918 - 1985) was a Canadian politician, who served on the Yukon Territorial Council from 1974 to 1978 and in the Legislative Assembly of Yukon from 1978 to 1982.

== Personal life ==
He was born and raised in Peace River, Alberta, and moved to Teslin, Yukon in 1949. In Teslin he worked as the owner of a construction company and a wilderness lodge, and competed in various sports including curling and dog mushing.

== Career ==
Fleming was first elected to the Territorial Council in the 1974 Yukon general election, representing the electoral district of Hootalinqua. Following the replacement of the Territorial Council with the Legislative Assembly of Yukon and the resultant introduction of political parties in the territory, Teslin was redistricted into the new riding of Campbell, and Fleming was reelected as MLA for Campbell in the 1978 Yukon general election; however, he did not join a political party as he was opposed to the introduction of party politics to the territory at that time, and instead ran and was elected as an independent MLA.

He joined the Yukon Progressive Conservative Party in 1981, although he declined an offer to be appointed to a cabinet post in the Executive Council of Yukon because he felt that other MLAs were more qualified to hold cabinet roles than he was. He was defeated in the 1982 Yukon general election by Dave Porter of the Yukon New Democratic Party.

== Death ==
Following his retirement from politics he moved to Chilliwack, British Columbia, where he died of a heart attack on February 15, 1985.
