= Whitehorse Porter Creek West =

Former territorial electoral district in the Yukon, Canada

Yukon electoral district

Defunct territorial electoral district
- Legislature: Yukon Legislative Assembly
- First contested: 1978
- Last contested: 1989

Demographics
- Census subdivision: Whitehorse

Whitehorse Porter Creek West was a territorial electoral district in Yukon. Serving the city of Whitehorse, the district elected one member to the Yukon Legislative Assembly from 1978 to 1992.

== Members ==
This riding has elected the following members of the Yukon Legislative Assembly:

Parliament	Years	Member	Party
24th	1978–1982	Doug Graham	Progressive Conservative
25th	1982–1985	Andy Philipsen	Progressive Conservative
26th	1985	Andy Philipsen	Progressive Conservative
26th	1985–1989	Alan Nordling	Progressive Conservative
27th	1989–1992	Alan Nordling	Progressive Conservative

== Election results ==
1978 Yukon general election
Party	Candidate	Votes	%	±%
Progressive Conservative	Doug Graham	188		
Liberal	Clive Tanner	142		
NDP	Kathy Horton	60		
Total				

1982 Yukon general election
Party	Candidate	Votes	%	±%
Progressive Conservative	Andy Philipsen	299		
NDP	David Cosco	119		
Liberal	Lawrence Whelan	45		
Total				

1985 Yukon general election
Party	Candidate	Votes	%	±%
Progressive Conservative	Andy Philipsen	393		
NDP	Ross Priest	280		
Liberal	Frances Nowasad	99		
Total				

By-election, February 10, 1986 Death of Andy Philipsen
Party	Candidate	Votes	%	±%
Progressive Conservative	Alan Nordling	418		
NDP	Ross Priest	311		
Liberal	Derm O'Donovan	106		
Total				

1989 Yukon general election
Party	Candidate	Votes	%	±%
Progressive Conservative	Alan Nordling	651		
NDP	John Wright	392		
Liberal	Eldon Organ	55		
Total				

== See also ==
- List of Yukon territorial electoral districts
- Canadian provincial electoral districts
