= Whitehorse West =

Territorial electoral district in the Yukon, Canada

Coordinates: 60.7079°N 135.1082°W

Yukon electoral district
- Interactive map of riding boundaries

Territorial electoral district
- Legislature: Yukon Legislative Assembly
MLA
Laura Lang
Yukon Party
- First contested: 1952
- Last contested: 2025

Demographics
- Electors (2021): 1,577
- Census subdivision(s): Arkell, Copper Ridge, Ingram, Logan

Whitehorse West is a territorial electoral district of Yukon that has been represented in the Yukon Legislative Assembly since 1952.

== Geography ==
Whitehorse West includes the subdivisions of Ingram, Arkell, and Logan; the north part of Copper Ridge bounded by Lazulite Drive to Tigereye Crescent, cutting across to the north of Ruby Lane, and extending to the boundary of the Porter Creek South electoral district. Besides Porter Creek South, Whitehorse West is bordered by the districts of Mountainview, and Copperbelt North. The Whitehorse district is the smallest riding, by size, in the Yukon.

== History ==
Whitehorse West is the former seat of Yukon Premier Tony Penikett of the Yukon New Democratic Party, Deputy Premier Elaine Taylor of the Yukon Party, Dennis Schneider, 8th Speaker of the Yukon Legislative Assembly, and Ken McKinnon, former Commissioner of the Yukon.

Initially considered a New Democrat stronghold, the riding evolved into a largely Yukon Party stronghold, despite falling to the Liberals in 2016. However, Whitehorse West could also be viewed as a bellwether, as it has voted for the governing party in every territorial election since 1985, except 1992.

== Members of the Legislative Assembly ==
Assembly	Years	Member	Party
Whitehorse West
24th	1978–1982	Tony Penikett	New Democratic
25th	1982–1985	Tony Penikett	New Democratic
26th	1985–1989	Tony Penikett	New Democratic
27th	1989–1992	Tony Penikett	New Democratic
28th	1992–1995	Tony Penikett	New Democratic
28th	1995–1996	Vacant	
28th	1996–1996	David Sloan	New Democratic
29th	1996–2000	David Sloan	New Democratic
30th	2000–2002	Dennis Schneider	Liberal
31st	2002–2006	Elaine Taylor	Yukon Party
32nd	2006–2011	Elaine Taylor	Yukon Party
33rd	2011–2016	Elaine Taylor	Yukon Party
34th	2016–2021	Richard Mostyn	Liberal
35th	2021–2025	Richard Mostyn	Liberal
36th	2025–Present	Laura Lang	Yukon Party

== Electoral results ==
=== 2025 ===
2025 Yukon general election
Party	Candidate	Votes	%	±%
Yukon Party	Laura Lang	615	55.06	+17.58
New Democratic	Katherine McCallum	363	32.50	+9.67
Liberal	Mike Pemberton	139	12.44	-27.24
Total valid votes		1,117		
Total rejected ballots				
Turnout			52.54	
Eligible voters		2,126		
Yukon Party gain from Liberal		Swing		+22.41
Source(s) "2025 General Election Official Results". Elections Yukon.

2021 Yukon general election redistributed results
Party	Votes	%
Liberal	408	39
Yukon Party	397	38
New Democratic	241	23

=== 2021 ===
2021 Yukon general election
Party	Candidate	Votes	%	±%
Liberal	Richard Mostyn	398	39.68	-6.1%
Yukon Party	Angela Drainville	376	37.48	-6.1%
New Democratic	Ron Davis	229	22.83	+12.1%
Total valid votes		1,003		
Total rejected ballots				
Turnout				
Eligible voters				
Liberal hold		Swing		-7.33
Source(s) "Unofficial Election Results 2021". Elections Yukon.

=== 2016 ===
2016 Yukon general election
Party	Candidate	Votes	%	±%
Liberal	Richard Mostyn	455	45.8%	+17.1%
Yukon Party	Elaine Taylor	433	43.6%	-14.3%
NDP	Stu Clark	106	10.7%	-2.2%
Total		994	100.0%	–

=== 2011 ===
2011 Yukon general election
Party	Candidate	Votes	%	±%
Yukon Party	Elaine Taylor	422	57.9%	+4.8%
Liberal	Cully Robinson	209	28.7%	-9.9%
NDP	Louis Gagnon	94	12.9%	+5.1%
Total		729	100.0%	–

=== 2006 ===
2006 Yukon general election
Party	Candidate	Votes	%	±%
Yukon Party	Elaine Taylor	511	53.1%	+5.7%
Liberal	Mike Walton	371	38.6%	+0.6%
NDP	Rhoda Merkel	75	7.8%	-6.1%
Total		963	100.0%	–

=== 2002 ===
2002 Yukon general election
Party	Candidate	Votes	%	±%
Yukon Party	Elaine Taylor	398	47.4%	+19.7%
Liberal	Dennis Schneider	319	38.0%	-2.5%
NDP	Rachel Grantham	117	13.9%	-17.4%
Total		840	100.0%	–

=== 2000 ===
2000 Yukon general election
Party	Candidate	Votes	%	±%
Liberal	Dennis Schneider	621	40.5%	+8.4%
NDP	Dave Sloan	480	31.3%	-9.4%
Yukon Party	Elaine Taylor	425	27.7%	+0.7%
Total		1535	100.0%	–

=== 1996 ===
1996 Yukon general election
Party	Candidate	Votes	%	±%
NDP	Dave Sloan	486	40.7%	-1.6%
Liberal	Larry Bagnell	383	32.1%	+0.2%
Yukon Party	Ken McKinnon	323	27.0%	+2.3%
Total		1195	100.0%	–

=== 1996 by-election ===
By-election: 1996
Party	Candidate	Votes	%	±%
NDP	Dave Sloan	433	42.3%	-3.3%
Liberal	Larry Bagnell	326	31.9%	+14.8%
Yukon Party	Shelda Hutton	253	24.7%	-10.1%
Total		1023	100.0%	–

- On the resignation of Tony Penikett, 1995

=== 1992 ===
1992 Yukon general election
Party	Candidate	Votes	%	±%
NDP	Tony Penikett	304	45.6%	-9.7%
Yukon Party	Bob Bruneau	232	34.8%	+1.3%
Liberal	Shaun Patrick Dennehy	114	17.1%	+6.2%
Independent	Bernd Schmidt	12	1.8%	+1.8%
Total		666	100.0%	–

- The Yukon Progressive Conservative Party re-branded itself as the Yukon Party before the 1992 election.

=== 1989 ===
1989 Yukon general election
Party	Candidate	Votes	%	±%
NDP	Tony Penikett	810	55.3%	-1.9%
Progressive Conservative	Flora Evans	491	33.5%	-8.9%
Liberal	Joe Jack	160	10.9%	+10.9%
Total		1465	100.0%	–

=== 1985 ===
1985 Yukon general election
Party	Candidate	Votes	%	±%
NDP	Tony Penikett	716	57.2%	+8.5%
Progressive Conservative	Charlie Friday	531	42.4%	-3.7%
Total		1251	100.0%	–

=== 1982 ===
1982 Yukon general election
Party	Candidate	Votes	%	±%
NDP	Tony Penikett	541	48.7%	+17.4%
Progressive Conservative	Pat Harvey	508	45.7%	+20.6%
Liberal	Adam Skrutkowski	59	5.3%	-21.9%
Total		1112	100.0%	–

=== 1978 ===
1978 Yukon general election
Party	Candidate	Votes	%	±%
NDP	Tony Penikett	230	31.3%	–
Liberal	John Watt	200	27.2%	–
Progressive Conservative	Anthony Fekete	185	25.1%	–
Independent	Al Omatani	81	11.0%	–
Independent	Guy Julien	37	5.0%	–
Total		736	100.0%	–

- Partisan politics introduced into the territory

=== 1974 ===
1974 Yukon general election
Party	Candidate	Votes	%	±%
Independent	Flo Whyard	252	42.3%	–
Independent	John Watt	227	38.1%	–
Independent	Al Omatani	116	19.5%	–
Total		596	100.0%	–

=== 1970 ===
1970 Yukon general election
Party	Candidate	Votes	%	±%
Independent	Ken McKinnon	444	23.4%	–
Independent	John Watt	294	28.7%	–
Independent	John P. Hoyt	281	27.5%	–
Total		1023	100.0%	–

== See also ==
- List of Yukon territorial electoral districts
- Canadian provincial electoral districts
