= Campbell (electoral district) =

Former territorial electoral district in the Yukon, Canada

Campbell was a territorial electoral district in the Canadian territory of Yukon, which was represented in the Legislative Assembly of Yukon from 1978 to 1992.

The district was first created for the 1978 Yukon general election, from parts of Hootalinqua, Pelly River and Watson Lake. The district was designed so that First Nations voters would be a majority. In that election, it was one of two districts in the territory to elect an independent MLA, despite the adoption of a new political party structure in territorial politics; Bob Fleming was particularly disdainful of party politics during the campaign, calling it a "great schmozzle", but relented and joined the Yukon Progressive Conservative Party in 1981. Fleming was defeated in the 1982 Yukon general election by Dave Porter of the Yukon New Democratic Party, and the district remained an NDP stronghold for the remainder of its existence.

The district was dissolved in 1992, when it was redistributed into Ross River-Southern Lakes.

== Representatives ==
Parliament	Years	Member	Party
24th	1978–1981	Bob Fleming	Independent
24th	1981–1982	Bob Fleming	Progressive Conservative
25th	1982–1985	Dave Porter	New Democratic
26th	1985–1989	Sam Johnston	New Democratic
27th	1989–1992	Sam Johnston	New Democratic

== See also ==
- List of Yukon territorial electoral districts
- Canadian provincial electoral districts
