= Doug Graham (Canadian politician) =

Canadian politician

Minister of Education
- In office January 16, 2015 – December 3, 2016
- Premier: Darrell Pasloski
- Preceded by: Elaine Taylor
- Succeeded by: Tracy McPhee

Minister of Health and Social Services
- In office November 5, 2011 – January 16, 2015
- Premier: Darrell Pasloski
- Preceded by: Glenn Hart
- Succeeded by: Mike Nixon

MLA for Porter Creek North
- In office October 11, 2011 – November 7, 2016
- Preceded by: Jim Kenyon
- Succeeded by: Geraldine Van Bibber

MLA for Whitehorse Porter Creek West
- In office November 20, 1978 – June 7, 1982
- Preceded by: Constituency established
- Succeeded by: Andy Philipsen

Minister of Justice Minister of Education
- In office December 14, 1978 – January 30, 1981
- Premier: Chris Pearson
- Preceded by: Office established

Personal details
- Born: 1949 (age 76–77)
- Party: Progressive Conservative (1978 - 1981); Independent (1981-1982); Yukon Party (2011-present)
- Occupation: Politician; Administrator

Doug Graham is a Canadian politician, who was elected to in the Yukon Legislative Assembly in the 2011 election. He represented the electoral district of Porter Creek North as a member of the Yukon Party caucus until his defeat in the 2016 election.

He previously represented the district of Whitehorse Porter Creek West from 1978 to 1982.

Before becoming a territorial legislator a second time, Graham was elected in 2009 as a city councillor in Whitehorse, carrying the highest number of votes amongst all candidates. In 2021, he ran for the Whitehorse City Council a second time, narrowly missing being elected by 22 votes.

== Electoral record ==
=== Yukon general election, 2016 ===
Whitehorse Centre
Party	Candidate	Votes	%	±%
NDP	Liz Hanson	487	43.8%	-18.3%
Liberal	Tamara Goeppel	432	38.9%	+23.6%
Yukon Party	Doug Graham	193	17.4%	-6.5%
Total		1,112	100.0%	–

=== Yukon general election, 2011 ===
Porter Creek North
Party	Candidate	Votes	%	±%
Yukon Party	Doug Graham	400	49.8%	+2.6%
New Democratic	Mike Tribes	253	31.5%	+7.6%
Liberal	Dawn Beauchemin	82	10.2%	-18.7%
Green	Mike Ivens	69	8.6%	–
Total		804	100.0%	–

=== Whitehorse municipal election, 2009 ===
Whitehorse municipal election, 2009
Candidate	Votes	%
Doug Graham	2,678	13.1%
Ranj Pillai	2,422	11.8%
Betty Irwin	2,001	9.8%
Dave Stockdale	1,986	9.7%
Florence Roberts	1,794	8.8%
Dave Austin	1,750	8.5%
Jeanine Myhre	1,459	7.1%
Ron Swizdaryk	1,450	7.1%
Graham Lang	1,395	6.8%
Skeeter Miller-Wright	1,370	6.7%
Janet Brault	1,163	5.7%
Michael Buurman	1,021	5.0%
Total	20,475	100.0%

=== Yukon general election, 1978 ===
Whitehorse Porter Creek West
Party	Candidate	Votes	%	±%
Progressive Conservative	Doug Graham	188	48.2%	–
Liberal	Clive Tanner	142	36.4%	–
NDP	Kathy Horton	60	15.4%	–
Total		390	100.0%	–
