= Ron Veale =

Canadian politician

The Honourable Ron Veale OY

MLA for Riverdale South
- In office 1981–1982
- Preceded by: Iain MacKay
- Succeeded by: Bea Firth

Leader of the Yukon Liberal Party
- In office 1981–1984
- Preceded by: Iain MacKay
- Succeeded by: Roger Coles

Personal details
- Born: 1945 (age 80–81) Ontario
- Party: Liberal
- Occupation: lawyer and Judge

Ronald Stuart Veale OY is a Canadian jurist and former politician, who represented the electoral district of Riverdale South in the Yukon Legislative Assembly from 1981 to 1982. He was a member of the Yukon Liberal Party, and the party's leader from 1981 to 1984.

Veale assumed the leadership of the Yukon Liberal Party in 1981 after the resignation of Iain MacKay, also running in and winning a by-election on March 9, 1981, to succeed MacKay as MLA for Riverdale South. Under his leadership, however, the party was entirely shut out of the legislature in the 1982 election. Veale resigned the party leadership in 1984, and was succeeded by Roger Coles.

He subsequently returned to his law practice. He was later appointed to the Supreme Court of Yukon, of which he was the Chief Justice until his retirement in July 2020. Veale was appointed to the Order of Yukon in December 2020.
