= Dave Porter (Canadian politician) =

Canadian politician

MLA for Campbell
- In office 1982–1985
- Preceded by: Robert Fleming
- Succeeded by: Sam Johnston

MLA for Watson Lake
- In office 1985–1989
- Preceded by: Don Taylor
- Succeeded by: John Devries

Personal details
- Born: November 24, 1953 (age 72); Lower Post, British Columbia, Canada
- Party: Yukon New Democratic Party

David Paul Porter (born November 24, 1953) is a former Canadian politician who served in the Legislative Assembly of Yukon from 1982 to 1989. He was a member of the Yukon New Democratic Party.

Porter was born at Lower Post, British Columbia in 1953. He was first elected in the 1982 election as MLA for Campbell. He shifted to the district of Watson Lake for the 1985 election, in which he was reelected, and served as House Leader and Deputy Premier in the government of Tony Penikett.

He did not run for reelection in the 1989 election. He was then appointed as executive director of the Yukon Human Rights Commission.

Porter later was CEO of the BC First Nations Energy and Mining Council, and chief negotiator for the Kaska Dena Council.
