= Iain MacKay (politician) =

Canadian politician

MLA for Whitehorse Riverdale South
- In office 1978–1980
- Preceded by: first member
- Succeeded by: Ron Veale

Leader of the Yukon Liberal Party
- In office 1978–1980
- Preceded by: first leader
- Succeeded by: Ron Veale

Personal details
- Born: 1942 (age 83–84)
- Party: Liberal

Iain MacKay (born 1942) is a former Canadian politician, who was the first leader of the Yukon Liberal Party and the first Leader of the Opposition in Yukon.

MacKay, a chartered accountant, led the Liberal Party into the 1978 election, the territory's first-ever partisan legislative election, and was elected to the Legislative Assembly of Yukon as MLA for Whitehorse Riverdale South. Even though his party lost the election overall, he was the only one of the three party leaders to win his own seat, as both Hilda Watson of the Yukon Progressive Conservative Party and Fred Berger of the Yukon New Democratic Party were defeated in their own districts.

He resigned as MLA and party leader in 1980 and was succeeded in both roles by Ron Veale.

MacKay subsequently moved to Vancouver, British Columbia, where he continued to work as an accountant, was active in the BC Liberal Party, and served as a board member of various charitable foundations.
