= Watson Lake-Ross River-Faro =

Territorial electoral district in the Yukon, Canada

Yukon electoral district
- Interactive map of riding boundaries

Territorial electoral district
- Legislature: Yukon Legislative Assembly
MLA
Patti McLeod
Yukon Party
- District created: 1970
- First contested: 1970
- Last contested: 2025

Demographics
- Electors (2016): 857
- Census subdivision(s): Swift River, Two Mile and Two and One-Half Mile Village, Upper Liard, Watson Lake, Yukon, Unorganized

Watson Lake-Ross River-Faro (formerly Watson Lake) is a territorial electoral district of Yukon that has been represented in the Yukon Legislative Assembly since 1970.

In accordance with the Yukon Electoral District Boundaries Act (2024), this riding experienced a significant westward expansion of boundaries into the former riding of Pelly-Nisutlin and was renamed to Watson Lake-Ross River-Faro for the 2025 Yukon general election.

== Geography ==
Being one of Yukon's eight rural ridings, the district includes the communities of Watson Lake and Upper Liard and is situated on the traditional territory of the Ross River Dena Council and the Liard First Nation of the Kaska Dena.

== Members of the Territorial Council / Legislative Assembly ==
Assembly	Years	Member	Party
Watson Lake
22nd	1970–1974	Donald Taylor	Independent
23rd	1974–1978	Donald Taylor	Independent
24th	1978–1982	Donald Taylor	Progressive Conservative
25th	1982–1985	Donald Taylor	Independent
26th	1985–1989	Dave Porter	New Democratic
27th	1989–1991	John Devries	Progressive Conservative
27th	1991–1992	John Devries	Yukon Party
28th	1992–1996	John Devries	Yukon Party
29th	1996–2000	Dennis Fentie	New Democratic
30th	2000–2002	Dennis Fentie	New Democratic
30th	2002–2002	Dennis Fentie	Yukon Party
31st	2002–2006	Dennis Fentie	Yukon Party
32nd	2006–2011	Dennis Fentie	Yukon Party
33rd	2011–2016	Patti McLeod	Yukon Party
34th	2016–2021	Patti McLeod	Yukon Party
35th	2021–2025	Patti McLeod	Yukon Party
Watson Lake-Ross River-Faro
36th	2025–Present	Patti McLeod	Yukon Party

== Electoral results ==
=== 2025 ===
2025 Yukon general election
Party	Candidate	Votes	%	±%
Yukon Party	Patti McLeod	409	53.19	-0.52
New Democratic	Josie O’Brien	285	37.06	+21.63
Liberal	Lael Lund	75	9.75	-21.11
Total valid votes		769		
Total rejected ballots				
Turnout			43.45	
Eligible voters		1,770		
Yukon Party hold		Swing		-11.07
Source(s) "2025 General Election Official Results". Elections Yukon.

2021 Yukon general election redistributed results
Party	Votes	%
Yukon Party	515	54
Liberal	296	31
New Democratic	148	15

=== 2021 ===
The Yukon NDP nominated candidate Amy Labonte. Two days after the close of nominations, following controversy over past social media posts, Labonte withdrew her candidacy on March 24, 2021. Watson Lake became the only electoral district in the Yukon without an NDP candidate. For the first time since 1970, Watson Lake had only two candidates on the ballot.

2021 Yukon general election: Watson Lake
Party	Candidate	Votes	%	±%
Yukon Party	Patti McLeod	313	56.9	+18.0
Liberal	Amanda Brown	237	43.1	+15.5
Total valid votes		550		
Total rejected ballots		11		
Turnout		561	56.0	
Eligible voters		1,002		
Yukon Party hold		Swing		+1.2
Source(s) "Official Election Results 2021" (PDF). Elections Yukon.

=== 2016 ===
2016 Yukon general election
Party	Candidate	Votes	%	±%
Yukon Party	Patti McLeod	299	38.9%	+1.8%
NDP	Erin Labonte	219	28.5%	-4.6%
Liberal	Ernie Jamieson	212	27.6%	+5.0%
Independent	Victor Kisoun	38	5.0%	-1.6%
Total		768	100.0%	–

=== 2011 ===
2011 Yukon general election
Party	Candidate	Votes	%	±%
Yukon Party	Patti McLeod	276	37.8%	-26.9%
NDP	Liard McMillan	242	33.1%	+27.3%
Liberal	Thomas Slager	165	22.6%	-3.0%
Independent	Patricia Gilhooly	48	6.6%	+6.6%
Total		731	100.0%	–

=== 2006 ===
2006 Yukon general election
Party	Candidate	Votes	%	±%
Yukon Party	Dennis Fentie	495	64.7%	+1.6%
Liberal	Rick Harder	196	25.6%	+4.4%
NDP	Rachael Lewis	45	5.8%	-10.0%
Independent	Dale Robert Worsfold	28	3.6%	+3.6%
Total		764	100.0%	–

=== 2002 ===
2002 Yukon general election
Party	Candidate	Votes	%	±%
Yukon Party	Dennis Fentie	521	63.1%	+46.2%
Liberal	Tom Cove	174	21.1%	-10.9%
NDP	Kathy Magun	130	15.8%	-35.3%
Total		825	100.0%	–

=== 2000 ===
2000 Yukon general election
Party	Candidate	Votes	%	±%
NDP	Dennis Fentie	434	51.1%	-1.7%
Liberal	Isaac Wood	272	32.0%	+19.3%
Yukon Party	Mickey Thomas	144	16.9%	-12.8%
Total		850	100.0%	–

=== 1996 ===
1996 Yukon general election
Party	Candidate	Votes	%	±%
NDP	Dennis Fentie	442	52.8%	+18.3%
Yukon Party	Barrie Ravenhill	249	29.7%	-29.0%
Liberal	Dave Kalles	106	12.7%	+5.9%
Independent	Mickey Thomas	40	4.8%	+4.8%
Total		837	100.0%	–

=== 1992 ===
1992 Yukon general election
Party	Candidate	Votes	%	±%
Yukon Party	John Devries	485	58.7%	+13.5%
NDP	Karel Kauppinen	285	34.5%	-10.2%
Liberal	Ron Lutz	56	6.8%	-2.7%
Total		826	100.0%	–

- The Yukon Progressive Conservative Party re-branded itself as the Yukon Party before the 1992 election.

=== 1989 ===
1989 Yukon general election
Party	Candidate	Votes	%	±%
Progressive Conservative	John Devries	298	45.2%	+29.4%
NDP	Karel Kauppinen	295	44.7%	+11.5%
Liberal	John McDonald	63	9.5%	+9.5%
Total		660	100.0%	–

=== 1985 ===
1985 Yukon general election
Party	Candidate	Votes	%	±%
NDP	Dave Porter	183	33.2%	+29.9%
Independent	Donald Taylor	174	30.6%	-0.4%
Independent	Brian Shanahan	119	21.0%	-8.1%
Progressive Conservative	Don McIntosh	90	15.8%	-11.1%
Total		568	100.0%	–

=== 1982 ===
1982 Yukon general election
Party	Candidate	Votes	%	±%
Independent	Donald Taylor	170	31.0%	+31.0%
Independent	Brian Shanahan	154	28.1%	+28.1%
Progressive Conservative	Dave Rollie	142	27.5%	-25.9%
Liberal	Eileen Van Bibber	60	10.9%	-34.9%
NDP	James Cahill	18	3.3%	+3.3%
Total		548	100.0%	–

=== 1978 ===
1978 Yukon general election
Party	Candidate	Votes	%	±%
Progressive Conservative	Donald Taylor	226	53.4%	–
Liberal	Grant Taylor	188	44.9%	–
Total		419	100.0%	–

- Partisan politics introduced into the territory

=== 1974 ===
1974 Yukon general election
Party	Candidate	Votes	%	±%
Independent	Donald Taylor	223	49.6%	–
Independent	Johnny Friend	110	24.4%	–
Independent	Harold Godfrey	107	23.8%	–
Total		450	100.0%	–

=== 1970 ===
1970 Yukon general election
Party	Candidate	Votes	%	±%
Independent	Donald Taylor	397	58.0%	–
Independent	R.W. Stubenberg	275	40.2%	–
Total		684	100.0%	–

== See also ==
- List of Yukon territorial electoral districts
- Canadian provincial electoral districts
