= Whitehorse North Centre =

Former territorial electoral district in the Yukon, Canada

Whitehorse North Centre was a territorial electoral district in the Canadian territory of Yukon, which was represented on the Yukon Territorial Council from 1974 to 1978 and in the Legislative Assembly of Yukon from 1978 to 1992.

== Representatives ==
Parliament	Years	Member	Party
23rd	1974–1978	Ken McKinnon	Independent
24th	1978–1982	Geoff Lattin	Progressive Conservative
25th	1982–1985	Margaret Commodore	New Democratic
26th	1985–1989	Margaret Commodore	New Democratic
27th	1989–1992	Margaret Commodore	New Democratic

== See also ==
- List of Yukon territorial electoral districts
- Canadian provincial electoral districts
