= John Devries (Yukon politician) =

Canadian politician

MLA for Watson Lake
- In office 1989–1996
- Preceded by: Dave Porter
- Succeeded by: Dennis Fentie

Personal details
- Born: March 20, 1945 (age 81) Netherlands
- Party: Yukon Progressive Conservative Party → Yukon Party

John Devries (born March 20, 1945) is a former political figure in the Yukon, Canada. He represented Watson Lake in the Yukon Legislative Assembly from 1989 to 1996 as a member of the Yukon Party.

He was born in the Netherlands, the son of Wiebe Devries and Geeskje Lenos, came to Canada with his parents in 1947 and was educated in Ontario. In 1967, he married Henriette Owendyke. He served in the Yukon cabinet as Minister of Economic Development, Mines, Small Business and Minister of Government Services from 1992 to 1994. Devries was Speaker for the assembly from 1994 to 1996. Before entering politics, he was a mechanic, taxidermist and guide.
