= Sam Johnston (Yukon politician) =

Canadian politician (born 1935)

Member of the Legislative Assembly of Yukon for Campbell
- In office May 13, 1985 – October 19, 1992
- Preceded by: Dave Porter
- Succeeded by: riding dissolved

Personal details
- Born: November 20, 1935 (age 90) Teslin, Yukon, Canada
- Party: Yukon New Democratic Party

Samuel Timothy Johnston OY (born November 20, 1935) is a Canadian former politician in the territory of Yukon. He served as chief of the Teslin Tlingit Council from 1970 to 1984, and represented Campbell in the Yukon Legislative Assembly from 1985 to 1992 as a NDP member.

He was born in Teslin, Yukon, the son of David Peter Johnston and Rose Morris, and was educated in Carcross. In 1983, he married Kelly Ruth Hyatt. Johnston served as Speaker for the assembly from 1985 to 1992. He was the first native Canadian to serve as a legislative speaker in Canada.

In the 1992 election, Johnston was defeated by independent Willard Phelps in the redistributed riding of Ross River-Southern Lakes.

He served as chancellor for Yukon College from 2004 to 2008.

Johnston also competed in archery at the North American Indigenous Games and was a coach at the North American Indigenous Games and the Arctic Winter Games. He was inducted into the Sport Yukon Hall of Fame in 2003.

He was made a member of the Order of Yukon in 2019.
