= Hootalinqua (electoral district) =

Former territorial electoral district in the Yukon, Canada

Hootalinqua was a territorial electoral district in the Canadian territory of Yukon, which was represented on the Yukon Territorial Council from 1974 to 1978 and in the Legislative Assembly of Yukon from 1978 to 1992.

== Representatives ==
Parliament	Years	Member	Party
23rd	1974–1978	Robert Fleming	Independent
24th	1978–1982	Al Falle	Progressive Conservative
25th	1982–1985	Al Falle	Progressive Conservative
26th	1985–1989	Willard Phelps	Progressive Conservative
27th	1989–1992	Willard Phelps	Progressive Conservative

== See also ==
- List of Yukon territorial electoral districts
- Canadian provincial electoral districts
