= Premier of Yukon =

Head of government of Yukon

- Premier ministre du Yukon
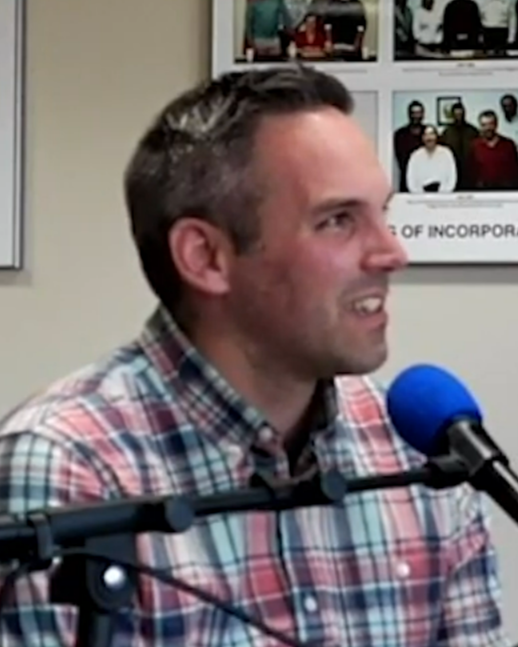
- Incumbent; Currie Dixon since November 22, 2025
- Office of the Premier
- Style: The Honourable (formal); Premier (informal)
- Status: Head of Government
- Member of: Legislative Assembly; Executive Council
- Reports to: Legislative Assembly; Commissioner
- Seat: Whitehorse
- Appointer: Commissioner of Yukon with the confidence of the Yukon Legislature
- Term length: At His Majesty's pleasure contingent on the premier's ability to command confidence in the legislative assembly
- Formation: October 9, 1979
- First holder: Chris Pearson
- Deputy: Deputy premier of Yukon
- Website: Office of the Premier

The premier of Yukon is the first minister and head of government for the Canadian territory of Yukon. The post is the territory's head of government, although its powers are considerably more limited than that of a provincial premier. The office was established in 1979 when most authority, by an order from Jake Epp, federal minister of Indian Affairs and Northern Development, was devolved from the appointed commissioner to the leader of the party that had the confidence of the Yukon Legislative Assembly; for the one-year period immediately prior to this, starting from the first conventional legislative elections in 1978, that leader was one of the members serving with the commissioner's executive committee (a Cabinet).

From 1979 to 1989, the term "government leader" was used. Tony Penikett chose to change the title to premier for his 1989 to 1992 term amid some controversy. His successor, John Ostashek, returned to using government leader, as did Ostashek's successor Piers McDonald. McDonald's successor Pat Duncan made the decision to use the title premier upon taking office in 2000 and the title has since remained unchanged.

The current premier of Yukon is Currie Dixon, leader of the Yukon Party. After winning the 2025 territorial election, Dixon became the first premier to be born in Yukon.

== See also ==
- Prime Minister of Canada
- Premier (Canada)
- List of premiers of Yukon
