= Willard Phelps =

Canadian politician

The Honourable Willard Phelps

2nd Premier of Yukon
- In office March 23, 1985 – May 28, 1985
- Commissioner: Douglas Bell
- Preceded by: Chris Pearson
- Succeeded by: Tony Penikett

Legislative Assembly of Yukon
- In office October 19, 1992 – September 30, 1996
- Preceded by: riding established
- Succeeded by: Dave Keenan
- Constituency: Ross River-Southern Lakes

Legislative Assembly of Yukon
- In office May 13, 1985 – October 19, 1992
- Preceded by: Al Falle
- Succeeded by: riding redistributed
- Constituency: Hootalinqua

Yukon Territorial Council
- In office October 7, 1974 – June 13, 1975
- Preceded by: position established
- Succeeded by: Walt Lengerke
- Constituency: Whitehorse Riverdale

Personal details
- Born: October 23, 1941 (age 84) Vancouver, British Columbia
- Party: Progressive Conservative
- Occupation: lawyer

Willard Leroy Phelps (born October 23, 1941) is a former Yukon politician, who briefly served as the second premier of Yukon in 1985.

== Background ==
Born in 1941, he was the grandson of Willard "Deacon" Phelps and the son of John Phelps, both former members of the Yukon Territorial Council. He graduated from the University of British Columbia in 1968 with a law degree.

== Political career ==
Phelps was first elected to the Yukon Territorial Council in 1974, but his election was overturned in 1975 after Don Branigan filed for a court injunction on the grounds that as the government was renting space in Phelps' commercial real estate holdings for some of its liquor stores, his serving on the council placed him in a conflict of interest.

He did not run for the Yukon Legislative Assembly in the elections of 1978 or 1982. However, with the resignation of Chris Pearson as government leader in 1985, the Progressive Conservatives chose Phelps as its new leader, and he was accordingly the second Government Leader from March 23 to May 28, 1985, when the Yukon NDP took office after winning the 1985 election. Phelps was the leader of the opposition from 1985 until 1991. When the Progressive Conservatives became the Yukon Party, Phelps became an Independent Alliance MLA but sat in the new party's caucus.

When John Ostashek's Yukon Party took power in 1992 with a minority government, Phelps lent his support and became minister of justice, health, and social services. In 1994 he dropped the justice portfolio and picked up responsibility for education. In his responsibilities for social services, Phelps instituted welfare reform hiring private investigators to look into welfare recipients. He also argued for the privatization of the government-owned energy concern. Phelps resigned his cabinet positions in March 1996. Phelps ran for re-election but lost his seat in the fall election.

Phelps formed the United Citizens Party of Yukon in 2009 to oppose the government of Dennis Fentie. He resigned as the party leader on May 9, 2011, for health reasons and due to waning interest.
