= Porter Creek North =

Territorial electoral district in the Yukon, Canada

Yukon electoral district
- Boundaries of Porter Creek North in Whitehorse

Territorial electoral district
- Legislature: Yukon Legislative Assembly
MLA
Doris Anderson
Yukon Party
- First contested: 1992
- Last contested: 2025

Demographics
- Electors (2021): 2,019
- Census subdivision(s): Crestview, Kulan, Porter Creek

Porter Creek North (formerly Whitehorse Porter Creek East) is a territorial electoral district of Yukon that has been represented in the Yukon Legislative Assembly since 1992.

The district at various points has been held by Yukon Conservative Senator Dan Lang, former Premier John Ostashek, former Whitehorse City Councillor Doug Graham, and former Yukon Commissioner Geraldine Van Bibber.

== Geography ==
Porter Creek North comprises the northern portion of the Whitehorse neighbourhood of Porter Creek. The district includes residential areas north of Wann Road and west toward the Alaska Highway and north of the Kulan Industrial area, along with parts of the Crestview neighbourhood. It is bordered by the ridings of Porter Creek Centre, Whistle Bend North, Riverdale North, and Lake Laberge.

== Members of the Legislative Assembly ==
Assembly	Years	Member	Party
Whitehorse Porter Creek East
24th	1978–1982	Dan Lang	Progressive Conservative
25th	1982–1985	Dan Lang	Progressive Conservative
26th	1985–1989	Dan Lang	Progressive Conservative
27th	1989–1991	Dan Lang	Progressive Conservative
27th	1991–1992	Dan Lang	Yukon Party
Porter Creek North
28th	1992–1996	John Ostashek	Yukon Party
29th	1996–2000	John Ostashek	Yukon Party
30th	2000–2002	Don Roberts	Liberal
30th	2002–2002	Don Roberts	Independent
31st	2002–2006	Jim Kenyon	Yukon Party
32nd	2006–2011	Jim Kenyon	Yukon Party
33rd	2011–2016	Doug Graham	Yukon Party
34th	2016–2021	Geraldine Van Bibber	Yukon Party
35th	2021–2025	Geraldine Van Bibber	Yukon Party
36th	2025–present	Doris Anderson	Yukon Party

== Election results ==
=== 2025 ===
2025 Yukon general election
** Preliminary results — Not yet official **
Party	Candidate	Votes	%	±%
Yukon Party	Doris Anderson	384	53.6	
New Democratic	Chris Dunbar	265	37.0	
Liberal	Jacklyn Stockstill	67	9.4	
Total valid votes		716		
Total rejected ballots				
Turnout				
Eligible voters				
Source(s) "Unofficial Election Results 2025". Elections Yukon.

2021 Yukon general election redistributed results
Party	Votes	%
Yukon Party	355	46
Liberal	238	31
New Democratic	178	23

=== 2021 ===
2021 Yukon general election
Party	Candidate	Votes	%	±%
Yukon Party	Geraldine Van Bibber	562	49.16	+5.2%
Liberal	Staci McIntosh	331	28.95	-8.8%
New Democratic	Francis Van Kessel	250	21.87	+7.2%
Total valid votes		1,143		
Total rejected ballots				
Turnout				
Eligible voters				
Yukon Party hold		Swing		-10.11
Source(s) "Unofficial Election Results 2021". Elections Yukon.

=== 2016 ===
2016 Yukon general election
Party	Candidate	Votes	%	±%
Yukon Party	Geraldine Van Bibber	435	44.0%	-5.3%
Liberal	Eileen Melnychuk	372	37.7%	+27.6%
New Democratic	Francis van Kessel	145	14.7%	-16.5%
Green	Mike Ivens	37	3.7%	-4.8%
Total		989	100.0%	–

=== 2011 ===
2011 Yukon general election
Party	Candidate	Votes	%	±%
Yukon Party	Doug Graham	400	49.3%	+2.3%
New Democratic	Mike Tribes	253	31.2%	+7.3%
Liberal	Dawn Beauchemin	82	10.1%	-18.8%
Green	Mike Ivens	69	8.5%	+8.5%
Total		811	100.0%	–

=== 2006 ===
2006 Yukon general election
Party	Candidate	Votes	%	±%
Yukon Party	Jim Kenyon	311	47.0%	+1.7%
Liberal	Dale Cheeseman	191	28.9%	+8.7%
NDP	Dave Hobbis	158	23.9%	+5.7%
Total		661	100.0%	–

=== 2002 ===
2002 Yukon general election
Party	Candidate	Votes	%	±%
Yukon Party	Jim Kenyon	331	45.3%	+11.2
Liberal	Dave Austin	148	20.2%	-33.1%
NDP	Mark Bowers	135	18.5%	15.4%
Independent	Roger Rondeau	112	15.3%	+3.2
Total		731	100.0%	–

=== 2000 ===
2000 Yukon general election
Party	Candidate	Votes	%	±%
Liberal	Don Roberts	504	53.3%	+14.1%
Yukon Party	John Ostashek	323	34.1%	-7.1%
NDP	Sidney Maddison	114	12.1%	-7.4%
Total		946	100.0%	–

=== 1996 ===
1996 Yukon general election
Party	Candidate	Votes	%	±%
Yukon Party	John Ostashek	403	41.2%	-11.2%
Liberal	Don Roberts	384	39.2%	+25.4%
NDP	Luigi Zanasi	191	19.5%	+13.8%
Total		979	100.0%	–

=== 1992 ===
1992 Yukon general election
Party	Candidate	Votes	%	±%
Yukon Party	John Ostashek	474	52.4%	–
NDP	Carl Rumscheidt	301	33.3%	–
Liberal	Eldon Organ	125	13.8%	–
Total		904	100.0%	–

== See also ==
- List of Yukon territorial electoral districts
- Canadian provincial electoral districts
