= Al Falle =

Canadian politician (1943–2022)

MLA for Hootalinqua
- In office 1978–1985
- Preceded by: Robert Fleming
- Succeeded by: Willard Phelps

Personal details
- Born: 1943 Quebec, Canada
- Died: November 26, 2022 (aged 79)
- Party: Progressive Conservative

Al Falle (1943 – November 26, 2022) was a Canadian politician, who represented the electoral district of Hootalinqua in the Yukon Legislative Assembly from 1978 to 1985. He sat as a member of the Yukon Progressive Conservative Party.

After his retirement from the legislature, he remained active in the Progressive Conservatives and the successor Yukon Party. He was an active supporter of Yukon Party MLA Brad Cathers, who quit the party in 2009 due to a disagreement with the leadership of then-Premier Dennis Fentie, resulting in Falle commencing a leadership challenge against Fentie in 2010 which he later withdrew. He supported the election of party leader Darrell Pasloski in 2011.

Falle died on November 26, 2022, at the age of 79.
