= Chris Pearson (politician) =

Canadian politician

The Honourable Chris Pearson

1st Premier of Yukon
- In office December 14, 1978 – March 23, 1985
- Commissioner: Frank Fingland; Ione Christensen; Douglas Bell
- Preceded by: Position established
- Succeeded by: Willard Phelps

MLA for Riverdale North
- In office November 20, 1978 – May 13, 1985
- Preceded by: Position established
- Succeeded by: Doug Phillips

Personal details
- Born: April 29, 1931 Lethbridge, Alberta
- Died: February 14, 2014 (aged 82) Pulaski County, Virginia
- Party: Progressive Conservative

Christopher William Pearson (April 29, 1931 – February 14, 2014) was the second leader of the Yukon Progressive Conservative Party and the first premier of Yukon.

Born in Lethbridge, Alberta, Pearson moved to the Yukon in 1957 and worked for the government from 1960 until 1973 when he entered private business. Prior to 1978, the territory had a non-partisan legislature with no individual acting as leader of the government or Premier.

== Career ==
Pearson was first elected to the Yukon Legislative Assembly in the 1978 election. He was not the party's leader going into the election campaign, but was chosen as government leader because of the defeat of leader Hilda Watson in her own riding. He became the leader of the Yukon Territory Progressive Conservative Party on December 8, 1978, when Watson resigned as leader. Pearson led the Yukon's first party government until his resignation in 1985.

Pearson's government opposed transboundary native land claims and argued that the territory should be a party to the Yukon land claims negotiations. The government also fought for greater responsible government in the territory, for granting the territory more say over its natural resources, and for the territory to be a full participant in federal-provincial conferences rather than just an observer. The government successfully obtained the transfer of a number of powers from the federally appointed commissioner of the territory to the government.

In 1982 the Pearson government was re-elected with a majority and attempted to deal with the effects of the economic recession on the territory which was exacerbated by the collapse of the hard mining industry and the closure of the Faro Mine.

Pearson left politics in 1985 but his successor, Willard Phelps, was not able to turn the government's fortunes around. The Yukon New Democratic Party won that year's election and formed government.

== After politics ==
Pearson served as deputy consul general at the Canadian Consulate in Dallas, Texas, before moving to the New River Valley of Virginia in 1990. He died on February 14, 2014, in Claytor Lake.

== Bibliography ==
- Smyth, Stephen (1991). The Yukon's Constitutional Foundations, Vol. 1: The Yukon Chronology. Whitehorse, YT: Northern Directories Ltd.
