= Maurice Byblow =

Canadian politician (1946–2020)

MLA for Faro
- In office 1978–1985
- Preceded by: first member
- Succeeded by: Jim McLachlan

MLA for Faro
- In office 1989–1992
- Preceded by: Jim McLachlan
- Succeeded by: Trevor Harding

Personal details
- Born: Maurice John Byblow; June 23, 1946 Yorkton, Saskatchewan, Canada
- Died: February 11, 2020 (aged 73) Yukon, Canada
- Party: Independent → New Democratic Party
- Occupation: teacher, municipal councillor

Maurice John Byblow (June 23, 1946 – February 11, 2020) was a Canadian politician, who represented the electoral district of Faro in the Yukon Legislative Assembly from 1978 to 1985 and from 1989 to 1996.

Originally elected as an independent, Byblow joined the Yukon New Democratic Party caucus on September 16, 1981. He retired in 1985, and was succeeded by Jim McLachlan. He was re-elected to the legislature in the 1989 election, and served until 1992. He later served as an executive assistant to NDP leader Piers McDonald, and both were implicated in a conflict of interest allegation, although both McDonald and Byblow were eventually cleared.

After retiring from politics, Byblow purchased the Capital Hotel in downtown Whitehorse in 1997, and worked as a hotelier until selling the hotel in early 2008.

Byblow died on February 11, 2020.

== Electoral record ==
1978 Yukon general election
Party	Candidate	Votes	%	±%
Independent	Maurice Byblow	361	60.1%	–
NDP	Stuart McCall	231	38.9%	–
Total		594	100.0%	–

1982 Yukon general election
Party	Candidate	Votes	%	±%
NDP	Maurice Byblow	357	49.3%	+10.4%
Progressive Conservative	Doris Gates	205	28.3%	+28.3%
Liberal	Wayne Peace	160	22.1%	+22.1%
Total		724	100.0%	–

1989 Yukon general election
Party	Candidate	Votes	%	±%
NDP	Maurice Byblow	194	42.8%	+9.3%
Liberal	Jim McLachlan	168	37.1%	-2.2%
Progressive Conservative	Mel Smith	90	19.9%	-7.0%
Total		453	100.0%	–
