= Executive Council of Yukon =

The Executive Council of Yukon (French: Conseil exécutif du Yukon), more commonly known as the Cabinet of Yukon (French: Cabinet du Yukon), is the cabinet of the Canadian territory of Yukon. It is chosen by the Premier from the elected members of the governing party in the Yukon Legislative Assembly.

The current Executive Council is made up of members of the Yukon Party (Current as of November 2025).

== Dixon ministry ==
Commissioner
The Honourable Adeline Webber		2023—
Portfolio	Minister	
Premier of Yukon & Minister of the Executive Council Office & Minister of Finance	Currie Dixon	2025—
Minister of Community Services & Minister responsible for the Yukon Lottery Commission	Cory Bellmore	2025—
Minister of Highways and Public Works	Linda Benoit	2025—
Minister of Health and Social Services	Brad Cathers	2025—
Minister of Economic Development & Minister of Tourism and Culture & Minister of the Public Service Commission & Minister responsible for the Yukon Liquor Corporation	Jen Gehmair	2025—
Minister of Environment	Wade Istchenko	2025—
Minister of Education & Minister responsible for the Yukon Housing Corporation	Scott Kent	2025—
Minister of Energy, Mines and Resources & Minister responsible for the Yukon Development Corporation & Minister responsible for the Yukon Energy Corporation	Ted Laking	2025—
Minister of Justice & Minister responsible for the French Language Services Directorate & Minister responsible for the Women and Gender Equity Directorate & Minister responsible for the Worker's Safety and Compensation Board	Laura Lang	2025—
