= Piers McDonald =

Canadian politician

Piers McDonald OC

5th Premier of Yukon
- In office October 19, 1996 – May 6, 2000
- Commissioner: Judy Gingell
- Preceded by: John Ostashek
- Succeeded by: Pat Duncan

MLA for Mayo
- In office June 7, 1982 – October 19, 1992
- Preceded by: Swede Hanson
- Succeeded by: riding dissolved

MLA for McIntyre-Takhini
- In office October 19, 1992 – April 17, 2000
- Preceded by: first member
- Succeeded by: Wayne Jim

Leader of the Yukon New Democratic Party
- In office 1995 – April 27, 2000
- Preceded by: Tony Penikett
- Succeeded by: Trevor Harding

Chancellor of Yukon University
- In office September 22, 2016 – October 6, 2020
- Preceded by: Geraldine Van Bibber
- Succeeded by: Jemena James Allen

Personal details
- Born: August 4, 1955 (age 71) Kingston, Ontario
- Party: New Democratic Party
- Education: Queen's University

Piers McDonald, OC (born August 4, 1955) is a Yukon politician and businessman. Born in Kingston, Ontario, McDonald, originally a miner by profession, is a long-time MLA, Cabinet minister, and the fifth premier of Yukon. He was leader of the Yukon New Democratic Party from 1995 to 2000.

Post-politics, McDonald became a businessman and community developer. He is a founding member, and currently chair, of Northern Vision Development, which has focused on residential and property revitalization, commercial real estate, and hospitality services in Yukon. He was also the chancellor of Yukon University from 2016 to 2020.

== Political career ==
=== 25th Legislative Assembly ===
McDonald was elected in the rural riding of Mayo as part of the New Democrat caucus in the 1982 election. Taking more than half the vote, he defeated incumbent Progressive Conservative MLA Swede Hanson. McDonald had been an underground miner, labour leader, and vice-president of the Yukon Federation of Labour before his entry into territorial politics.

The New Democrats, under the leadership of Tony Penikett, formed the Official Opposition in the 25th Legislative Assembly. McDonald acted as critic for Rural Development, Labour, Occupational Health and Safety, and Workers' Compensation.

=== 26th Legislative Assembly ===
In the 1985 election, Tony Penikett led the New Democrats to a narrow minority government. McDonald was sworn in as a member of the Yukon Executive Council as Minister of Education, Minister of Community and Transportation Services, and Minister of the Yukon Housing Corporation. During that time, McDonald oversaw a significant agenda for his portfolios, ushering in the creation of the Yukon College and the establishment of the Yukon Arts Centre and the Whitehorse Public Library.

Other initiatives of his included: the Native Teacher Education Program; the opening and paving of the South Klondike Highway, which provided tidewater access for Yukon mines; the transfer of private-sector municipal airports and the Alaska Highway to the Yukon Government; and the establishment of the first home ownership programs and homesteader policies in the territory.

=== 27th Legislative Assembly ===
McDonald was re-elected in Mayo in the 1989 election, which saw the New Democrats attain majority status in the legislative assembly. He was once again sworn into Cabinet, this time as Government House Leader, Minister of Education, Minister of Government Services, Minister of Economic Development, Mines and Small Business, Minister of the Public Service Commission, and Minister of the Workers’ Compensation Health and Safety Board.

During the 27th Legislative Assembly, McDonald oversaw the creation of the Yukon's first Education Act, as well as a new Workers’ Compensation Health and Safety Act. He oversaw the signing of an oil and gas accord with the Government of the Northwest Territories and an economic development agreement with the Government of Canada. Within the public school system, he also established policies on busing, computers, special education, and experiential learning. Yukon's only French First Language school, École Emilie Tremblay, was opened under his mandate.

=== 28th Legislative Assembly ===
In the 1992 election, McDonald ran for election in the newly created Whitehorse riding of McIntyre-Takhini. His riding of Mayo had been amalgamated with the neighbouring riding of Tatchun. He was elected to McIntyre-Takhini that election, but the Penikett government was narrowly defeated by a minority Yukon Party government led by John Ostashek and propped up by three independent MLAs. Penikett subsequently resigned as leader of the Yukon New Democratic Party and McDonald succeeded him as leader. He assumed the critic portfolios of Finance and Economic Development and served as Leader of the Official Opposition.

=== 29th Legislative Assembly ===
McDonald defeated the government of John Ostashek in the election of September 30, 1996, his government elected with a large level of support in rural Yukon. McDonald's party captured 11/17 seats, then the largest majority in Yukon history, and McDonald was once again re-elected in McIntyre-Takhini. He became Premier of the Yukon, then referred to as ‘Government Leader’, and assumed the responsibilities of Minister of Finance and Minister of the Executive Council.

During his premiership, McDonald's government oversaw significant restructuring of the Yukon's governance. The Umbrella Final Agreement, jointly established through the mandates of Penikett and Ostashek, began to usher in final land claims negotiations for many Yukon First Nations. With the federal government, a devolution accord on the Transfer of Lands and Resource Management to the Yukon was negotiated (ultimately implemented in 2003). McDonald also emphasized intergovernmental and circumpolar relations, established new territorial parks and community schools, and created new government strategies for restorative justice, protected areas, trade and investment, forestry, and energy.

While his government left a $60 million budget surplus and earned a good reputation for promoting social programs and protecting the environment, the Yukon had suffered from a decline in the territory's economy due to a fall in world metal prices and the closure of several mines. This became a major campaign issue in the 2000 general election, along with a resulting mass exodus of nearly one-in-ten people from the Yukon.

Ultimately, these economic hardships fueled the rise of the Pat Duncan Liberals and in the 2000 general election, McDonald's NDP government was defeated and McDonald himself lost his own seat of McIntyre-Takhini. NDP support had largely held in rural Yukon, but it was the Liberals' sweep of the territory's Whitehorse ridings that ensured the NDP's defeat. McDonald resigned as party leader on April 27, 2000.

== Post political activities ==
Since leaving territorial politics, McDonald has developed a career as a businessman and management consultant. He became one of the founding members of Northern Vision Development in 2004 and served as its chief executive officer until 2009. Northern Vision Development is one of the Yukon's most extensive commercial and real estate investors and has focused on project management, property revitalization, commercial real estate, and hospitality services in the Yukon. McDonald continues to serve as chair of its board of directors. He was named the Whitehorse Chamber of Commerce's Businessperson of the Year in 2007.

Shortly after his exit from politics, McDonald was appointed the volunteer president of the 2007 Canada Winter Games Host Society for the upcoming Whitehorse event – the first held north of the 60th parallel. McDonald focused on using the Games to promote a vision of pan-northernism and collaboration and he successfully oversaw the modernization of much of Whitehorse's sports infrastructure. McDonald continues to serve on the Canada Games Council as its vice-president. He was named the Yukon Commissioner's Volunteer of the Year in 2007 in recognition for his volunteerism and leadership of the Canada Winter Games.

In September 2008, McDonald was appointed to the Board of Directors of Northwestel, the communications company providing service to the Yukon, the Northwest Territories and Nunavut. He also served as chair of the Yukon Energy Corporation's board of directors and governance from 2009 to 2014.

Following the tenth anniversary of the creation of Nunavut, McDonald led a review of the Government of Nunavut. The ‘’Government of Nunavut Report Card’’ compiled and analysed the opinions of 2,100 Nunavummiut and produced 93 recommendations on how the Government of Nunavut could improve its services and operations. Focus included land claims, decentralization of government, housing, education, and economic development.

In September 2016, McDonald was appointed as chancellor of Yukon University. He was succeeded by Jemena James Allen, on October 6, 2020.

== Honours ==
In 2008, in recognition for McDonald’s volunteerism and pan-northern focus in leading the 2007 Canada Winter Games, as well as his ongoing role in Northern economic development and a lifetime of service to the Yukon, McDonald was appointed an Officer of the Order of Canada. He is one of only four Yukoners to be appointed Officer of the Order.

In June 2011, Queen's University presented McDonald with an honorary Doctorate of Laws, in recognition of McDonald's work in education, aboriginal land claims and devolution during his political career in Yukon. He is also credited for spearheading construction of Yukon College's Whitehorse campus, the Yukon Arts Centre, the South Klondike Highway, and schools in Dawson City, Old Crow and Watson Lake.

== Electoral record ==
=== 2000 general election ===
McIntyre-Takhini
Party	Candidate	Votes	%	±%
Liberal	Wayne Jim	376	37.9%	+17.7%
NDP	Piers McDonald	338	34.1%	-14.9%
Yukon Party	John Edzerza	265	26.7%	-1.2%
Total		991	100.0%	–

=== 1996 general election ===
McIntyre-Takhini
Party	Candidate	Votes	%	±%
NDP	Piers McDonald	441	49.0%	+6.3%
Yukon Party	Scott Howell	251	27.9%	-11.7%
Liberal	Rosemary Couch	182	20.2%	+3.9%
Independent	Clinton Fraser	21	2.3%	+2.3%
Total		900	100.0%	–

=== 1992 general election ===
McIntyre-Takhini
Party	Candidate	Votes	%	±%
NDP	Piers McDonald	313	42.7%	–
Yukon Party	Scott Howell	290	39.6%	–
Liberal	Larry Bill	126	16.3%	–
Total		733	100.0%	–

=== 1989 general election ===
Mayo
Party	Candidate	Votes	%	±%
NDP	Piers McDonald	210	62.3%	+6.9%
Progressive Conservative	Mike McGinnis	93	27.6%	-12.7%
Liberal	Wilf Tuck	34	10.1%	+6.1%
Total		337	100.0%	–

=== 1985 general election ===
Mayo
Party	Candidate	Votes	%	±%
NDP	Piers McDonald	251	55.4%	+3.1%
Progressive Conservative	Ken Cooper	183	40.3%	+1.0%
Liberal	Rob Andison	18	4.0%	-4.0%
Total		453	100.0%	–

=== 1982 general election ===
Mayo
Party	Candidate	Votes	%	±%
NDP	Piers McDonald	230	52.3%	+29.1%
Progressive Conservative	Swede Hanson	173	39.3%	+12.5%
Liberal	Eleanor Van Bibber	35	8.0%	-16.0%
Total		440	100.0%	–
