= Margaret Commodore =

Canadian politician (1932–2026)

Member of the Yukon Legislative Assembly for Whitehorse Centre (Whitehorse North Centre; 1982–1992)
- In office June 7, 1982 – September 30, 1996
- Preceded by: Geoff Lattin
- Succeeded by: Todd Hardy

Personal details
- Born: October 9, 1932 Chilliwack, British Columbia, Canada
- Died: June 1, 2026 (aged 93)
- Party: New Democratic
- Occupation: Politician

Margaret Muriel Commodore (or Margaret Joe; October 9, 1932 – June 1, 2026) was a Canadian politician. She represented the electoral district of Whitehorse North Centre in the Yukon Legislative Assembly from 1982 to 1992, and Whitehorse Centre from 1992 to 1996. Commodore was a member of the Yukon New Democratic Party.

== Life and career ==
Margaret Muriel Commodore was born in Chilliwack, British Columbia, Canada on October 9, 1932.

Under the Tony Penikett governments, she was Minister of Health and Human Resources from 1986 to 1989 and the first Aboriginal Minister of Justice in Canada from 1989 to 1992. She was also the first-ever First Nations woman to ever be named to a cabinet in Canada in 1985.

Commodore was a member of the Sto:lo Nation. In 2013 she testified regarding her abuse at the hands of the residential school system at the Truth and Reconciliation Commission of Canada.

Commodore died on June 1, 2026.
