= Daniel Lang (Yukon politician) =

Canadian politician

The Honourable Daniel Lang

Canadian Senator from Yukon
- In office January 2, 2009 – August 15, 2017
- Nominated by: Stephen Harper
- Appointed by: Michaëlle Jean
- Preceded by: Ione Christensen
- Succeeded by: Pat Duncan

Member of the Yukon Legislative Assembly for Whitehorse Porter Creek East
- In office 1978–1992
- Preceded by: first member
- Succeeded by: riding dissolved

Personal details
- Born: Hector Daniel Lang; April 3, 1948 (age 78) Dawson Creek, British Columbia, Canada
- Party: Yukon Party
- Other political affiliations: Conservative

Hector Daniel Lang (born April 3, 1948) is a former Canadian politician, who was a Conservative member of the Senate of Canada from 2009 to 2017. He was appointed on the advice of Stephen Harper to the Senate on January 2, 2009.

== Political career ==
He was previously a Progressive Conservative member of the Yukon Legislative Assembly, representing the electoral district of Whitehorse Porter Creek East from 1978 to 1992. Prior to the creation of the legislative assembly in 1978, he served a term on the non-partisan Yukon Territorial Council from 1974 to 1978 in the district of Whitehorse Porter Creek.

His brother Archie Lang was a cabinet minister in the Yukon prior to retiring from politics in 2011.

Lang was eligible to remain in the Senate until his 75th birthday in 2023 but in 2017 he announced that he was retiring early from the Senate in order to spend more time with his family.

== Personal life ==
His daughter-in-law, Laura Lang, was elected to the Yukon Legislative Assembly in the 2025 Yukon general election.
