= Tony Penikett =

Canadian politician (born 1945)

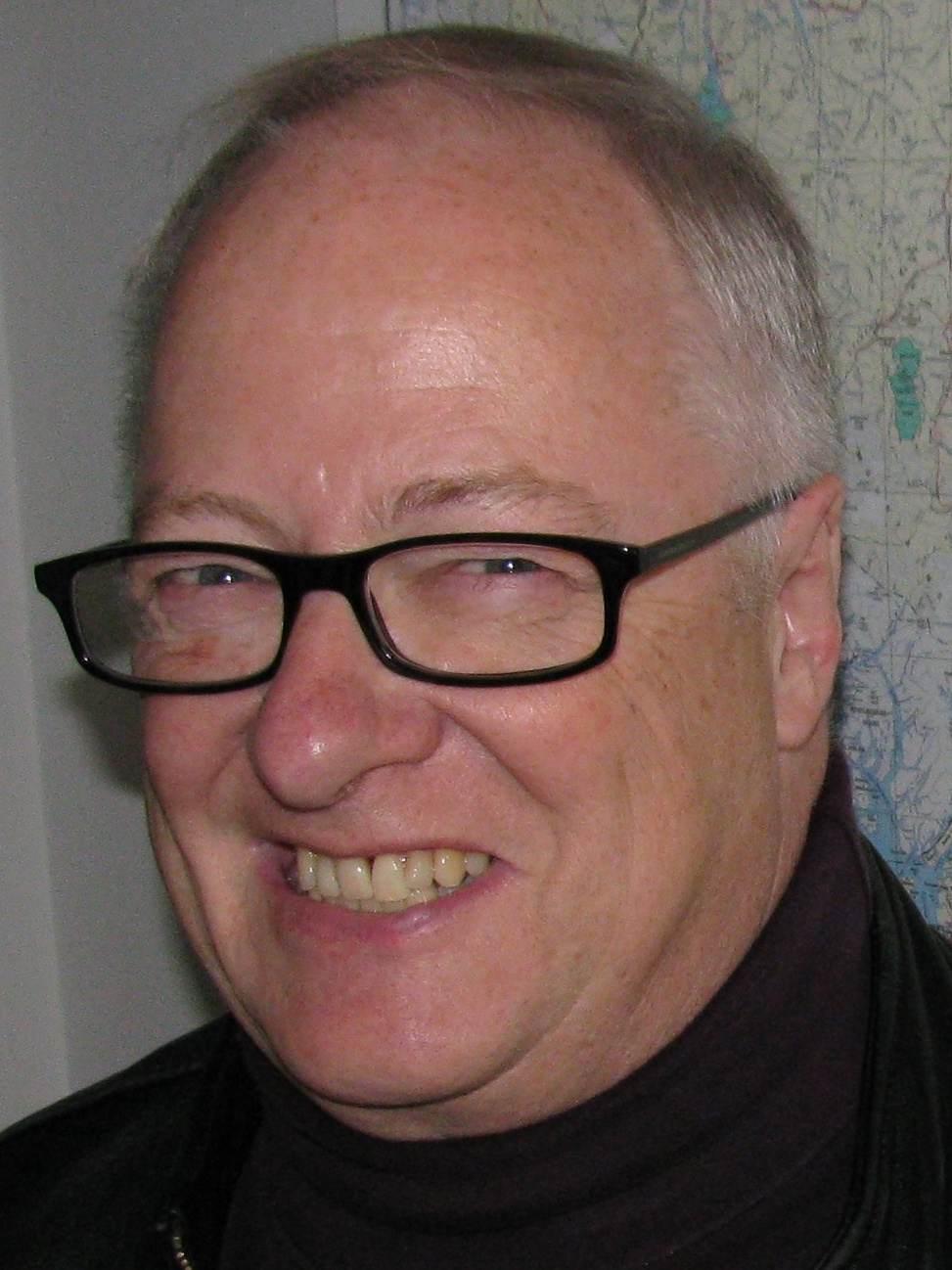

3rd Premier of Yukon
- In office May 29, 1985 – November 6, 1992
- Commissioner: Douglas Bell; John Kenneth McKinnon
- Preceded by: Willard Phelps
- Succeeded by: John Ostashek

Leader of the Yukon New Democratic Party
- In office 1981–1995
- Preceded by: Fred Berger
- Succeeded by: Piers McDonald

President of the New Democratic Party
- In office 1981–1985
- Preceded by: Alvin Hewitt
- Succeeded by: Marion Dewar

MLA for Whitehorse West
- In office November 20, 1978 – September 27, 1995
- Preceded by: Flo Whyard
- Succeeded by: David Sloan

Personal details
- Born: Antony David John Penikett; November 14, 1945 (age 80) Sussex, England
- Party: New Democratic Party

Antony David John Penikett OC (born November 14, 1945) is a mediator and negotiator and former politician in Yukon, Canada, who served as the third premier of Yukon from 1985 to 1992.

== Early life and political activity ==
Born in Sussex, England, on November 14, 1945, and educated at St Albans School in Hertfordshire, England, and in Alberta and Ontario, Penikett began his Yukon working life as an asbestos mine labourer at Clinton Creek, Yukon, where he became active in his union as a shop steward and chair of the grievance committee.

An activist with the New Democratic Party (NDP), Penikett was campaign manager in the 1972 election for Wally Firth, the first Indigenous northern MP ever elected to the House of Commons. He was the party's candidate in Yukon in the 1974 federal election, but was not elected.

Penikett became a member of the New Democratic Party's federal council in 1973 and served as executive assistant to Ed Broadbent from 1975 to 1977. He then returned to Yukon, where he was elected to Whitehorse City Council in 1977.

He was president of the federal NDP from 1981 to 1985.

== Premier of Yukon ==
He was first elected to the Yukon Legislative Assembly in 1978, representing the constituency of Whitehorse West as a member of the Yukon New Democratic Party. He was the party's only MLA elected that year.

In 1981, Penikett succeeded Fred Berger as leader of the party. Under his leadership, independent MLA Maurice Byblow crossed the floor to join the party, and Roger Kimmerly won a by-election for the party in October. With the party having surpassed the Yukon Liberal Party in seats, Penikett became Leader of the Opposition.

The party won six seats in the 1982 election, retaining Official Opposition status.

In the 1985 territorial election, the party won eight seats, forming a minority government with Penikett serving as government leader. Four of the party's eight MLAs were of First Nations descent, with a by-election win by Danny Joe in 1987 bringing First Nations representation in the government to five out of nine; this remains the all-time historical record for First Nations representation in a Canadian legislature. Joe's by-election win also lifted the party to majority government status.

Penikett fought the federal government for a better deal for the territory in Canadian Confederation and for control over its natural resources. He and Dennis Patterson, premier of the Northwest Territories, also fought for a greater role at First Minister's conferences. Penikett's government negotiated and signed an umbrella agreement for First Nations land claims, negotiated the first four agreements with individual First Nations, and developed an economic development strategy for the Yukon in consultation with citizens.

Penikett also brought forward the Yukon Human Rights Act, which banned discrimination on the basis of age, race, gender or sexual orientation. It was only the second such act passed anywhere in Canada.

The NDP formed a majority government after the 1989 election, winning nine seats. Later that year, Penikett took on the title of Premier, the first government leader in the territory to be given that title, in a bid to increase the territory's clout in relations with the federal and provincial governments.

Penikett's government opposed the Meech Lake Accord, believing it would make it impossible for the Yukon to ever become a province. According to Penikett, the accord violated the rights of Yukon residents by granting to each existing province an absolute veto over the creation of a new province, as well as by giving provinces, but not territories, consultation rights on the appointment of new Senators and new Supreme Court justices, and would condemn northerners to "forever be second-class citizens". Penikett's government fought the accord in court, although its case was dismissed by the Yukon Court of Appeal. During the subsequent Charlottetown Accord negotiations, Penikett raised many of the same concerns that he had during Meech, although he ultimately supported the final deal.

After seven years in power, the NDP was defeated in the 1992 election by the conservative Yukon Party. Penikett's successor, John Ostashek, dropped Penikett's use of the title "Premier", reverting to the older form "Government Leader", although the "Premier" title was reinstituted in 1996 by Piers McDonald and has remained in use ever since.

On April 25, 1994 Penikett announced his resignation as leader of the Yukon NDP, and was succeeded by Piers McDonald at a party convention in May 1995. There was an attempt later in 1994 to draft Penikett as a candidate in the federal New Democratic Party's 1995 leadership contest, but he declined to run.

He remained in the legislature as the MLA for Whitehorse West until September 27, 1995, when he resigned to accept a position as a policy advisor in the office of Saskatchewan Premier Roy Romanow.

== Later career ==
After two years as an advisor in the cabinet planning unit with the Government of Saskatchewan, in 1998 he was appointed by the government of British Columbia to lead contract negotiations with the province's public sector unions.

Between 1998 and 2000, Penikett and his colleague John Calvert negotiated 32 public sector accords (on early retirement, pay equity and joint trusteeship of pension plans) with public sector employer organizations and unions representing 250,000 provincial public employers. This is to date the largest number of social contracts ever negotiated in Canada.

From 2001 to 2005, Penikett was a senior fellow on native treaty issues and a visiting professor for the Undergraduate Semester in Dialogue at Simon Fraser University. He has also worked at the Walter and Duncan Gordon Foundation, and for West Coast Environmental Law.

Penikett was appointed as the University of Washington's Canada Fulbright Chair in Arctic Studies for 2013-14. For the duration of this award, he will be located at the Henry M. Jackson School of International Studies, and conducting a “Comparative Study of Canadian and U.S. Approaches to Issues of Arctic Governance in the 21st Century.”

Since 2001, he is the president of Tony Penikett Negotiations.

In 2020 he was named an Officer of the Order of Canada, in recognition of his contributions as a teacher, negotiator and public servant.

== Personal life ==
Penikett is the father of actor Tahmoh Penikett, best known for his work as Karl Agathon in Battlestar Galactica and Paul Ballard in Dollhouse. His twin daughters Sarah and Stephanie Penikett have also appeared on television, in Psych and The L-Word. Their mother, Lulla Sierra Johns, is a member of the White River First Nation.

Penikett is the author of Reconciliation: First Nations Treaty Making in British Columbia (Douglas & McIntyre, 2006), 'Hunting the Northern Character,' (UBC Press, 1997), Treaty Time, (TPNI 2025) and with John Calvert '35 Accords: Re-Imagining British Columbia's Public Sector Labour Relations (Ethics International Press, 2025); two television films, The Mad Trapper (BBC TV, London, 1972) and La Patrouille Perdue (ORTF, Paris, 1974); and several stage plays.
