= List of Indigenous Canadian politicians =

This is a list of indigenous persons in Canada who have been elected to the federal House of Commons, legislative assemblies of provinces and territories, and members appointed to the Senate. It also includes Indigenous Canadians who have been elected to overseas legislatures.

The first Metis politicians elected to the House of Commons were Pierre Delorme and Angus McKay, elected as Conservative party MPs in 1871. The very first First Nations parliamentarian is Leonard Marchand.

There have been 46 Indigenous persons who have served as Members of Parliament, as well as 21 who have been named Senators. After the 2021 Canadian election, the largest number of Indigenous persons were elected to Parliament in history – with 11 MPs (3.3% of the House of Commons). The current Indigenous Members of Parliament consist of 6 Liberals, 3 New Democrats and 2 Conservatives.

Provincially three times an Indigenous person has served as premier (or been elected to serve as premier). John Norquay, who was Métis, served as premier of Manitoba from 1878 to 1887. Peter Lougheed, who was of Metis ancestry (although that fact is not generally known), served as premier of Alberta 1971-1985. Wab Kinew, of the Onigaming First Nation, began to serve as premier of Manitoba in October 2023.

Indigenous persons have been elected to 11 of the 13 provincial legislatures – with only Nova Scotia and Prince Edward Island never having had Indigenous representation. As of October 2024, 28 Indigenous people serve in seven provincial legislatures. Those 28 consist of 21 New Democrats, 4 Conservatives (one Manitoba Progressive Conservative, one BC Conservative, one CAQ, one UCP), and one Liberal.

In the territories, Indigenous persons form a majority of members of the legislatures of Nunavut and the Northwest Territories. Additionally, the Yukon legislature includes four indigenous MLAs (two Liberals, one New Democrat, and one Yukon Party).

Outside Canada, one Indigenous Canadian was elected in Australia: Walt Secord served as a Labor member of the New South Wales Legislative Council from 2011 until his retirement in 2023. Secord is of Mohawk and Ojibwe descent.

== Federal ==
=== House of Commons ===
Portrait	Member of Parliament	Riding	Took office	Left office	Party	Ref.	Note
	Pierre Delorme (1832–1912)	Provencher, MB	March 3, 1871	July 7, 1872	Conservative		Métis
	Angus McKay (1836–1910)	Marquette, MB	March 3, 1871	July 7, 1872	Conservative		Métis
	Louis Riel (1844–1885)	Provencher, MB	October 13, 1873	January 22, 1874	Independent		Métis
	William Boucher (1889–1976)	Rosthern, SK	October 25, 1948	August 9, 1953	Liberal		Métis
	Roger Teillet (1912–2002)	St. Boniface, MB	June 18, 1962	June 24, 1968	Liberal		Métis
	Eugène Rhéaume (1932–2013)	Northwest Territories	April 8, 1963	November 7, 1965	Conservative		Métis
	Leonard Marchand (1933–2016)	Kamloops–Cariboo, BC	June 25, 1968	May 21, 1979	Liberal		First Nations (Syilx)
	Wally Firth (1935–2024)	Northwest Territories	October 30, 1972	May 21, 1979	NDP		Métis
	Peter Ittinuar ᐲᑎᕐ ᐃᑦᑎᓄᐊᕐ (born 1950)	Nunatsiaq	May 22, 1979	November 26, 1982	NDP		Inuit
	Peter Ittinuar ᐲᑎᕐ ᐃᑦᑎᓄᐊᕐ (born 1950)	Nunatsiaq	November 26, 1982	September 3, 1984	Liberal		Inuit
	Cyril Keeper (born 1943)	Winnipeg North Centre, MB	February 18, 1980	November 20, 1988	NDP		Métis
	Thomas Suluk ᑖᒪᔅ ᓱᓗᒃ (born 1950)	Nunatsiaq	September 4, 1984	November 20, 1988	Conservative		Inuit
	Jack Anawak ᔭᒃ ᐃᐊᕋᒃ ᐊᓇᕙᒃ (born 1950)	Nunatsiaq	November 21, 1988	June 1, 1997	Liberal		Inuit
	Ethel Blondin-Andrew (born 1951)	Western Arctic, NWT	November 21, 1988	January 22, 2006	Liberal		First Nations (Dene)
	Willie Littlechild (born 1944)	Wetaskiwin, AB	November 21, 1988	October 24, 1993	Conservative		First Nations (Cree)
	Elijah Harper (1949–2013)	Churchill, MB	October 25, 1993	June 1, 1997	Liberal		First Nations (Oji-Cree)
	Lawrence D. O'Brien (1951–2004)	Labrador, NL	March 26, 1996	December 16, 2004	Liberal		Métis
	Nancy Karetak-Lindell ᓇᓐᓰ ᑲᕆᑕᒃ-ᓕᓐᑎᓪ (born 1957)	Nunavut	June 2, 1997	March 16, 2008	Liberal		Inuit
	Rick Laliberte (born 1958)	Churchill River, SK	June 2, 1997	June 27, 2004	Liberal		Métis
	Bernard Cleary (1937–2020)	Louis-Saint-Laurent, QC	June 28, 2004	January 22, 2006	Bloc Quebecois		First Nations (Innu)
	David Smith (born 1963)	Pontiac, QC	June 28, 2004	January 22, 2006	Liberal		Métis
	Todd Russell (born 1966)	Labrador, NL	May 24, 2005	May 1, 2011	Liberal		Metis (NunatuKavut)
	Rod Bruinooge (born 1973)	Winnipeg South, MB	January 23, 2006	October 18, 2015	Conservative		Métis
	Tina Keeper (born 1962)	Churchill, MB	January 23, 2006	October 13, 2008	Liberal		First Nations (Cree)
	Gary Merasty (born 1964)	Desnethé—Missinippi—Churchill River, SK	January 23, 2006	August 31, 2007	Liberal		First Nations (Cree)
	Rob Clarke (born 1967)	Desnethé—Missinippi—Churchill River, SK	March 17, 2008	October 18, 2015	Conservative		First Nations (Cree)
	Leona Aglukkaq ᓕᐅᓇ ᐊᒡᓘᒃᑲᖅ (born 1967)	Nunavut	October 14, 2008	October 18, 2015	Conservative		Inuit
	Shelly Glover (born 1967)	Saint Boniface, MB	October 14, 2008	October 18, 2015	Conservative		Métis
	Jonathan Genest-Jourdain (born 1979)	Manicouagan, QC	May 2, 2011	October 18, 2015	NDP		First Nations (Innu)
	Peter Penashue (born 1964)	Labrador, NL	May 2, 2011	March 14, 2013	Conservative		First Nations (Innu)
	Romeo Saganash (born 1961)	Abitibi—Baie-James—Nunavik—Eeyou, QC	May 2, 2011	October 20, 2019	NDP		First Nations (Cree)
	Yvonne Jones (born 1968)	Labrador, NL	May 13, 2013	April 27, 2025	Liberal		Métis (NunatuKavut)
	Vance Badawey (born 1964)	Niagara Centre, ON	October 19, 2015	April 27, 2025	Liberal		Métis
	Hunter Tootoo; Hᐊᓐᑕ ᑐᑐ (born 1963)	Nunavut	October 19, 2015	May 31, 2016	Liberal		Inuit
	Hunter Tootoo; Hᐊᓐᑕ ᑐᑐ (born 1963)	Nunavut	May 31, 2016	September 11, 2019	Independent		Inuit
	Georgina Jolibois (born 1968)	Desnethé—Missinippi—Churchill River, QC	October 19, 2015	October 20, 2019	NDP		First Nations (Clearwater River Dene)
	Michael McLeod (born 1959)	Northwest Territories	October 19, 2015	April 27, 2025	Liberal		Métis (Dene)
	Robert-Falcon Ouellette (born 1979)	Winnipeg Centre, MB	October 19, 2015	October 20, 2019	Liberal		First Nations (Red Pheasant Cree) & Métis
	Don Rusnak (born 1975)	Thunder Bay—Rainy River, ON	October 19, 2015	October 20, 2019	Liberal		First Nations (Anishinaabe)
	Marc Serré (born 1955)	Nickel Belt, ON	October 19, 2015	April 27, 2025	Liberal		Métis
	Dan Vandal (born 1960)	Saint Boniface—Saint Vital, MB	October 19, 2015	March 23, 2025	Liberal		Métis
	Jody Wilson-Raybould (born 1971)	Vancouver Granville, BC	October 19, 2015	April 2, 2019	Liberal		First Nations (Kwakwaka’wakw)
	Jody Wilson-Raybould (born 1971)	Vancouver Granville, BC	April 2, 2019	August 15, 2021	Independent		First Nations (Kwakwaka’wakw)
	Jaime Battiste (born 1979)	Sydney—Victoria, NS	October 21, 2019	Incumbent	Liberal		First Nations (Mi'kmaq)
	Marc Dalton (born 1960)	Pitt Meadows—Maple Ridge, BC	October 21, 2019	Incumbent	Conservative		Métis
	Leah Gazan (born 1972)	Winnipeg Centre, MB	October 21, 2019	Incumbent	NDP		First Nations (Lakota)
	Mumilaaq Qaqqaq ᒧᒥᓛᖅ ᖃᖅᑲᖅ (born 1993)	Nunavut	October 21, 2019	August 15, 2021	NDP		Inuit
	Simon-Pierre Savard-Tremblay	Saint-Hyacinthe—Bagot—Acton, QC	October 21, 2019	Incumbent	Bloc Quebecois		First Nations (Wendat)
	Lori Idlout ᓘᕆ ᐃᓪᓚᐅᖅ (born 1974)	Nunavut	September 20, 2021	Incumbent	NDP		Inuit
	Blake Desjarlais (born 1993)	Edmonton Griesbach, AB	September 20, 2021	April 27, 2025	NDP		Métis (Cree Heritage)
	Adam Chambers (born 1984 or 1985)	Simcoe North, ON	September 20, 2021	Incumbent	Conservative		Métis
	Buckley Belanger	Desnethé—Missinippi—Churchill River, SK	April 28, 2025	Incumbent	Liberal		Métis
	Rebecca Chartrand	Churchill—Keewatinook Aski, MB	April 28, 2025	Incumbent	Liberal		First Nations (Anishinaabe, Cree, Dakota) and Métis
	Wade Grant	Vancouver Quadra, BC	April 28, 2025	Incumbent	Liberal		First Nations (Musqueam)
	Mandy Gull-Masty	Abitibi—Baie-James—Nunavik—Eeyou, QC	April 28, 2025	Incumbent	Liberal		First Nations (Cree)
	Billy Morin	Edmonton Northwest, AB	April 28, 2025	Incumbent	Conservative		First Nations (Cree)
	Ellis Ross	Skeena—Bulkley Valley, BC	April 28, 2025	Incumbent	Conservative		First Nations (Haisla)

=== Senate ===
Portrait	Senator	Riding	Took office	Left office	Party	Ref.	Note
	Richard Hardisty (1831–1889)	Northwest Territories	February 23, 1888	October 18, 1889	Conservative		Métis
	James Gladstone (1887–1971)	Alberta	January 31, 1958	March 31, 1971	Conservative		Metis (Cree)
	Guy Williams (1907–1992)	British Columbia	December 9, 1971	October 7, 1982	Liberal		First Nations (Haisla)
	Willie Adams (born 1934)	Northwest Territories	April 5, 1977	March 31, 1999	Liberal		Inuit
	Willie Adams (born 1934)	Nunavut	April 1, 1999	June 22, 2009	Liberal		Inuit
	Charlie Watt (born 1944)	Quebec	January 16, 1984	March 16, 2018	Liberal		Inuit
	Leonard Marchand (1933–2016)	British Columbia	June 29, 1984	March 1, 1998	Liberal		First Nations (Syilx)
	Walter Twinn (1934–1997)	Alberta	September 27, 1990	October 30, 1997	Conservative		First Nations (Cree)
	Gerry St. Germain (born 1937)	British Columbia	June 23, 1993	November 6, 2012	Conservative		Métis
	Thelma Chalifoux (1929–2017)	Alberta	November 26, 1997	February 8, 2004	Liberal		Métis
	Aurélien Gill (1933–2015)	Quebec	September 17, 1998	August 2, 2008	Liberal		First Nations (Innu)
	Nick Sibbeston (born 1943)	Northwest Territories	September 2, 1999	November 21, 2017	Liberal		Métis
	Lillian Dyck (born 1945)	Saskatchewan	March 24, 2005	August 24, 2020	PSG		First Nations (Cree)
	Sandra Lovelace Nicholas (born 1948)	New Brunswick	September 21, 2005	January 31, 2023	PSG		First Nations (Maliseet)
	Patrick Brazeau (born 1974)	Quebec	January 8, 2009	February 7, 2013	Conservative		First Nations (Algonquin)
	Patrick Brazeau (born 1974)	Quebec	February 7, 2013	Incumbent	Independent		First Nations (Algonquin)
	Murray Sinclair (born 1951)	Manitoba	April 2, 2016	January 31, 2021	Independent		First Nations (Ojibwe)
	Daniel Christmas (born 1956)	Nova Scotia	December 6, 2016	January 31, 2023	Independent		First Nations (Mi'kmaq)
	Mary Jane McCallum (born 1952)	Manitoba	December 4, 2017	Incumbent	Independent		First Nations (Cree)
	Yvonne Boyer (born 1953)	Ontario	March 15, 2018	Incumbent	Independent		Métis
	Marty Klyne (born 1957)	Saskatchewan	September 24, 2018	Incumbent	PSG		First Nations (Cree); Métis
	Patti LaBoucane-Benson (born 1969)	Alberta	October 3, 2018	Incumbent	Independent		Métis
	Margaret Dawn Anderson (born 1967)	Northwest Territories	December 12, 2018	Incumbent	PSG		Inuit (Inuvialuit)
	Brian Francis (born 1957)	Prince Edward Island	December 12, 2018	Incumbent	PSG		First Nations (Mi'kmaq)
	Michèle Audette (born 1971)	Quebec	July 29, 2021	Incumbent	Independent		First Nations (Innu)
	Margo Lainne Greenwood (born 1953)	British Columbia	November 10, 2022	Incumbent	ISG		First Nations (Cree)
	Judy White (born 1964)	Newfoundland and Labrador	July 6, 2023	Incumbent	Independent		First Nations (Qalipu)
	Paul Prosper (born 1965)	Nova Scotia	July 6, 2023	Incumbent	Independent		First Nations (Mi'kmaq)
	Nancy Karetak-Lindell ᓇᓐᓰ ᑲᕆᑕᒃ-ᓕᓐᑎᓪ (born 1957)	Nunavut	December 19, 2024	Incumbent	Independent		Inuit

== Provincial ==
=== Alberta ===
Portrait	MLA	Riding	Took office	Left office	Party	Ref.	Note
	Peter Lougheed (1928–2012)	Calgary-West	May 23, 1967	February 28, 1986	Conservative		Métis
	Pearl Calahasen (born 1952)	Lesser Slave Lake	March 20, 1989	May 4, 2015	Conservative		Métis
	Mike Cardinal (1941–2023)	Athabasca-Redwater	March 20, 1989	March 2, 2008	Conservative		First Nations (Cree)
	Yvonne Fritz (born 1950)	Calgary-Cross	June 15, 1993	May 4, 2015	Conservative		Métis
	Frank Oberle (born 1957)	Peace River	November 22, 2004	May 4, 2015	Conservative		Métis
	Brooks Arcand-Paul	Edmonton-West Henday	May 29, 2023	Incumbent	NDP		First Nations (Cree)
	Scott Sinclair (born 1984)	Lesser Slave Lake	May 29, 2023	Incumbent	Conservative		First Nations
	Jodi Calahoo Stonehouse (born 1974 or 1975)	Edmonton-Rutherford	May 29, 2023	Incumbent	NDP		First Nations (Cree); First Nations (Mohawk)

=== British Columbia ===
Portrait	MLA	Riding	Took office	Left office	Party	Ref.	Note
	James W. Douglas	Victoria City	1875	1878	Independent		Métis (Note: His mother, Amelia Connolly, was Métis. His father, Governor James Douglas, was not Indigenous.)
	Frank Arthur Calder (1915–2006)	Atlin	June 15, 1949	1975	CCF/NDP		First Nations (Nisga’a)
	Frank Arthur Calder (1915–2006)	Atlin	1975	May 9, 1979	Social Credit		First Nations (Nisga’a)
	Larry Guno (1940–2005)	Atlin	October 22, 1986	October 17, 1991	NDP		First Nations (Nisga’a)
	Carole James (born 1957)	Victoria-Beacon Hill	May 17, 2005	October 24, 2020	NDP		Métis
	Marc Dalton (born 1960)	Maple Ridge-Mission	May 12, 2009	May 8, 2017	BC Liberal		Métis
	Melanie Mark (born 1975)	Vancouver-Mount Pleasant	February 2, 2016	April 14, 2023	NDP		First Nations (Nisga’a); First Nations (Cree); First Nations (Gitxsan); First Nations (Ojibway)
	Adam Olsen (born 1976)	Saanich North and the Islands	May 9, 2017	September 21, 2024	Green		First Nations (Coast Salish)
	Ellis Ross (born 1965)	Skeena	May 9, 2017	September 21, 2024	BC United		First Nations (Haisla)
	Joan Phillip (born 1952)	Vancouver-Mount Pleasant	June 24, 2023	Incumbent	NDP		First Nations (Tsleil-Waututh)
	Tamara Davidson	North Coast-Haida Gwaii	October 21, 2024	Incumbent	NDP		First Nations (Haida)
	Debra Toporowski	Cowichan Valley	October 21, 2024	Incumbent	NDP		First Nations (Cowichan)
	Á'a:líya Warbus (born 1984 or 1985)	Chilliwack-Cultus Lake	October 21, 2024	Incumbent	BC Conservative		First Nations (Stó꞉lō)

=== Manitoba ===
Portrait	MLA	Riding	Took office	Left office	Party	Ref.	Note
	Pascal Breland (1811–1896)	St. Francois Xavier East	December 27, 1870	December 29, 1874	Independent		Métis
	Pierre Delorme (1832–1912)	St. Norbert South	December 27, 1870	December 29, 1874	Independent		Métis
	André Beauchemin (1824–1902)	St. Vital	December 27, 1870	December 29, 1874	Independent		Métis
	John Norquay (1841–1889)	High Bluff	December 27, 1870	December 29, 1874	Independent		Métis
	John Norquay (1841–1889)	St. Andrews South	December 30, 1874	December 15, 1879	Independent		Métis
	John Norquay (1841–1889)	St. Andrews South	December 16, 1879	July 10, 1888	Conservative		Métis
	John Norquay (1841–1889)	Kildonan	July 11, 1888	July 5, 1889	Conservative		Métis
	Louis Schmidt (1844–1935)	Saint Boniface	December 27, 1870	December 29, 1874	Independent		Métis
	Louis Schmidt (1844–1935)	Saint Boniface	December 18, 1878	December 15, 1879	Independent		Métis
	Maxime Lépine (1837–1897)	St. Francois Xavier East	December 30, 1874	December 17, 1878	Independent		Métis
	Maxime Goulet (1855–1932)	La Verendrye	December 18, 1878	January 22, 1883	Independent		Métis
	Maxime Goulet (1855–1932)	La Verendrye	January 23, 1883	December 8, 1886	Conservative		Métis
	Patrice Breland (1837–1908)	St. Francis Xavier	December 16, 1879	January 22, 1883	Conservative		Métis
	Edith Rogers (1876–1947)	Winnipeg	1920	1932	Liberal		Métis
	Roger Teillet (1912–2002)	St. Boniface	June 8, 1953	May 13, 1959	Liberal		Métis
	Ken Dillen (1938–2020)	Thompson	June 28, 1973	October 10, 1977	NDP		First Nations (Anishinaabe)
	Elijah Harper (1949–2013)	Rupertsland	November 17, 1981	November 30, 1992	NDP		First Nations (Oji-Cree)
	Denis Rocan (born 1949)	Carman	March 18, 1986	May 21, 2007	Conservative		Métis
	Greg Dewar (born 1956)	Selkirk	September 11, 1990	April 19, 2016	NDP		Métis
	George Hickes (born 1946)	Point Douglas	September 11, 1990	October 4, 2011	NDP		Inuit
	Oscar Lathlin (1947–2008)	The Pas	September 11, 1990	October 1, 2008	NDP		First Nations (Cree)
	Eric Robinson (born 1953)	Kewatinook	September 21, 1993	April 18, 2016	NDP		First Nations (Cree)
	Frank Whitehead	The Pas	March 24, 2009	May 16, 2014	NDP		First Nations (Cree)
	Kevin Chief (born 1974)	Point Douglas	October 4, 2011	January 9, 2017	NDP		Métis
	Amanda Lathlin (1976–2026)	The Pas	April 22, 2015	September 10, 2019	NDP		First Nations (Cree)
	Amanda Lathlin (1976–2026)	The Pas-Kameesak	September 10, 2019	March 21, 2026	NDP		First Nations (Cree)
	Nahanni Fontaine (born 1971)	St. Johns	April 19, 2016	Incumbent	NDP		First Nations (Anishinaabe)
	Wab Kinew (born 1981)	Fort Rouge	April 19, 2016	Incumbent	NDP		First Nations (Anishinaabe); Manitoba NDP Leader and Premier of Manitoba
	Judy Klassen	Kewatinook	April 19, 2016	August 12, 2019	Liberal		First Nations (Cree); Manitoba Liberal Interim Leader (2016–2017)
	Bob Lagassé	Dawson Trail	April 19, 2016	Incumbent	Independent		Métis
	Alan Lagimodiere (born 1957)	Selkirk	April 19, 2016	September 5, 2023	Conservative		Métis
	Colleen Mayer	St. Vital	April 19, 2016	September 9, 2019	Conservative		Métis
	Bernadette Smith	Point Douglas	June 13, 2017	Incumbent	NDP		First Nations (Anishinaabe); Métis
	Ian Bushie	Keewatinook	September 10, 2019	Incumbent	NDP		First Nations (Anishinaabe)
	Eric Redhead	Thompson	June 7, 2022	Incumbent	NDP		First Nations (Cree)
	Renée Cable	Southdale	October 3, 2023	Incumbent	NDP		Métis
	Billie Cross	Seine River	October 3, 2023	Incumbent	NDP		Métis
	Robert Loiselle	St. Boniface	October 3, 2023	Incumbent	NDP		Métis
	Tyler Blashko	Lagimodière	October 3, 2023	Incumbent	NDP		Métis

=== New Brunswick ===
Portrait	MLA	Riding	Took office	Left office	Party	Ref.	Note
	T. J. Burke (born 1972)	Fredericton-Nashwaaksis	June 9, 2003	September 26, 2010	Liberal		First Nations (Maliseet)

=== Newfoundland and Labrador ===
Portrait	MHA	District	Took office	Left office	Party	Ref.	Note
	Kevin Aylward (born 1960)	St. George's-Stephenville East	April 2, 1985	September 29, 2003	Liberal		First Nations (Mi'kmaq)
	William Andersen III (born 1948)	Torngat Mountains	May 20, 1993	January 29, 1996	Liberal		Inuit (Nunatsiavut)
	Wally Andersen (born 1951)	Torngat Mountains	February 22, 1996	February 13, 2007	Liberal		Inuit (Nunatsiavut)
	Yvonne Jones (born 1968)	Cartwright-L'Anse au Clair	February 22, 1996	April 8, 2013	Liberal		Métis (NunatuKavut)
	Patty Pottle	Torngat Mountains	October 9, 2007	October 10, 2011	PC		Inuit (Nunatsiavut)
	Keith Russell (born 1975)	Lake Melville	October 10, 2011	November 27, 2015	PC		Inuit (Nunatsiavut)
	Keith Russell (born 1975)	Lake Melville	October 14, 2025	Incumbent	PC		Inuit (Nunatsiavut)
	Randy Edmunds	Torngat Mountains	October 11, 2011	May 16, 2019	Liberal		Inuit (Nunatsiavut)
	Lisa Dempster	Cartwright-L'Anse au Clair	July 18, 2013	Incumbent	Liberal		Métis (NunatuKavut)
	Lela Evans	Torngat Mountains	May 16, 2019	March 7, 2022	PC		Inuit (Nunatsiavut)
	Lela Evans	Torngat Mountains	March 7, 2022	July 16, 2024	NDP		Inuit (Nunatsiavut)
	Lela Evans	Torngat Mountains	July 16, 2024	Incumbent	PC		Inuit (Nunatsiavut)

=== Northwest Territories ===
Portrait	MLA	Riding	Took office	Left office	Party	Ref.	Note
	Nick Sibbeston (born 1943)	Mackenzie-Laird	December 21, 1970	March 9, 1975	Independent		Métis Premier of NWT
	Nick Sibbeston (born 1943)	Mackenzie-Laird	October 1, 1979	November 20, 1983	Independent		Métis Premier of NWT
	Nick Sibbeston (born 1943)	Nahendeh	November 21, 1983	October 14, 1991	Independent		Métis Premier of NWT
	Peter Fraser (1921–2000)	Mackenzie Great Bear	February 16, 1976	November 20, 1983	Independent		Métis
	Nellie Cournoyea (born 1940)	Western Arctic	October 1, 1979	November 21, 1983	Independent		Inuit (Inupiaq) Premier of NWT
	Nellie Cournoyea (born 1940)	Nunakput	November 21, 1983	October 16, 1995	Independent		Inuit (Inupiaq) Premier of NWT
	Richard Nerysoo (born 1953)	Mackenzie Delta	October 1, 1979	October 15, 1995	Independent		First Nations (Gwich'in) Premier of NWT
	Stephen Kakfwi (born 1950)	Sahtu	October 5, 1987	November 23, 2003	Independent		First Nations (Dene) Premier of NWT
	Tony Whitford (1941–2024)	Yellowknife South	October 31, 1988	October 15, 1995	Independent		Métis
	Tony Whitford (1941–2024)	Kam Lake	December 6, 1999	November 23, 2003	Independent		Métis
	Floyd Roland (born 1961)	Nahendeh	October 16, 1995	October 5, 2011	Independent		Inuvialuit
	Fred Koe (born 1947)	Inuvik	October 15, 1991	October 15, 1995	Independent		First Nations (Gwich'in)
	Michael McLeod (born 1959)	Deh Cho	December 6, 1999	October 2, 2011	Independent		First Nations (Dene)
	Kevin Menicoche (born 1961)	Nahendeh	November 24, 2003	November 22, 2015	Independent		First Nations (Dene)
	Jackson Lafferty (born 1969)	Monfwi	July 18, 2005	Incumbent	Independent		First Nations (Dene)
	Bob McLeod (born 1952)	Yellowknife South	October 1, 2007	September 2, 2019	Independent		First Nations (Dene) Premier of NWT
	Jackie Jacobson	Nunakput	October 1, 2007	November 22, 2015	Independent		Inuit (Inuvialuit)
	Jackie Jacobson	Nunakput	October 1, 2019	Incumbent	Independent		Inuit (Inuvialuit)
	Frederick Blake Jr. (born 1977)	Mackenzie Delta	October 3, 2011	Incumbent	Independent		First Nations (Gwich'in)
	Alfred Moses (1977–2022)	Inuvik Boot Lake	October 3, 2011	September 2, 2019	Independent		First Nations
	Michael Nadli	Deh Cho	October 3, 2011	September 2, 2019	Independent		First Nations (Dene)
	Herbert Nakimayak	Nunakput	November 23, 2015	September 2, 2019	Independent		Inuit
	R.J. Simpson (born 1980)	Hay River North	November 23, 2015	Incumbent	Independent		Métis
	Caroline Cochrane (born 1960)	Range Lake	November 23, 2015	Incumbent	Independent		Métis Premier of NWT
	Steve Norn	Tu Nedhé-Wiilideh	October 1, 2019	November 23, 2021	Independent		First Nations (Deninu Kųę́)
	Rocky Simpson Sr.	Hay River South	October 1, 2019	Incumbent	Independent		Métis and First Nations (Mikisew Cree)
	Frieda Martselos	Thebacha	October 1, 2019	Incumbent	Independent		First Nations (Salt River)
	Ronald Bonnetrouge	Deh Cho	October 1, 2019	Incumbent	Independent		First Nations (Deh Gáh Got'ı̨ę)
	Diane Archie	Inuvik Boot Lake	October 1, 2019	Incumbent	Independent		Inuit (Inuvialuit)
	Lesa Semmler (born 1976)	Inuvik Twin Lakes	October 1, 2019	Incumbent	Independent		Inuit (Inuvialuit)
	Pauline Chinna	Sahtu	October 1, 2019	Incumbent	Independent		First Nations (Sahtu)
	Caroline Wawzonek	Yellowknife South	October 1, 2019	Incumbent	Independent		Métis

=== Nova Scotia ===
Portrait	MLA	Electoral district	Took office	Left office	Party	Ref.	Note
	Leah Martin (born 1986)	Cole Harbour	November 26, 2024	Incumbent	PC		Member of the Millbrook First Nation and first Indigenous person elected to the Nova Scotia House of Assembly; Minister of Communications and Minister of L'nu Affairs

=== Ontario ===
Portrait	MPP	Electoral district	Took office	Left office	Party	Ref.	Note
	Solomon White (1836–1911)	Essex North	1878	1894	Conservative		First Nation - Wyandot of Anderdon Reserve of the Huron (community voted to be enfranchised in 1877 while his father Joseph White was chief)
	Peter North (born 1960)	Elgin	September 6, 1990	June 2, 1999	NDP (left caucus Aug 1993)		Obtained Indian status through adoptive mother Minister of Tourism and Recreation (1990-92) in the Rae ministry
	Peter North (born 1960)	Elgin	September 6, 1990	June 2, 1999	Independent		Obtained Indian status through adoptive mother Minister of Tourism and Recreation (1990-92) in the Rae ministry
	Dave Levac (born 1954)	Brant	June 3, 1999	June 7, 2018	Liberal		Métis; Speaker of the Legislative Assembly of Ontario 2011-18
	Guy Bourgouin	Mushkegowuk—James Bay	June 7, 2018	Incumbent	NDP		Métis
	Sol Mamakwa ᓴᐧᓬ ᒣᒣᑫᐧ	Kiiwetinoong	June 7, 2018	Incumbent	NDP		First Nations - Kingfisher Lake First Nation (Oji-Cree)
	Suze Morrison	Toronto Centre	June 7, 2018	May 3, 2022	NDP		Identifies as having mixed settler and Indigenous heritage

=== Prince Edward Island ===
Prince Edward Island is yet to elect an Indigenous MLA.

=== Quebec ===
Portrait	MNA	Riding	Took office	Left office	Party	Ref.	Note
	Ludger Bastien (1879–1948)	Québec-Comté	November 5, 1924	May 15, 1927	Conservative		First Nations (Huron)
	Alexis Wawanoloath (born 1982)	Abitibi-Est	March 26, 2007	December 7, 2008	Parti Quebecois		First Nations (Algonquian)
	Kateri Champagne Jourdain	Duplessis	October 3, 2022	Incumbent	Coalition Avenir Québec		First Nations (Innu)

=== Saskatchewan ===
Portrait	MLA	Riding	Took office	Left office	Party	Ref.	Note
	Joseph Nolin (1866–1925)	Athabasca	August 14, 1908	June 25, 1917	Liberal		Métis
	Joseph Nolin (1866–1925)	Île-à-la-Crosse	June 26, 1917	December 1, 1925	Liberal		Métis
	Jules Marion (1884–1941)	Île-à-la-Crosse	April 26, 1926	June 18, 1934	Liberal		Métis
	Jules Marion (1884–1941)	Athabasca	June 8, 1938	April 5, 1941	Liberal		Métis
	Louis Marcien Marion (1906–1976)	Athabasca	June 15, 1944	June 10, 1952	Liberal		Métis
	Lawrence Riel Yew (1942–1998)	Cumberland	April 26, 1982	October 19, 1986	NDP		Métis
	Keith Goulet (born 1946)	Cumberland	October 20, 1986	November 4, 2003	NDP		Métis
	Joan Beatty	Cumberland	November 5, 2003	January 3, 2008	NDP		First Nations (Cree)
	Buckley Belanger (born 1960)	Athabasca	June 21, 1995	1998	Liberal		Métis
	Buckley Belanger (born 1960)	Athabasca	1998	August 15, 2021	NDP		Métis
	Serge LeClerc (1949–2011)	Saskatoon Northwest	November 7, 2007	August 31, 2010	Saskatchewan		Métis
	Doyle Vermette	Cumberland	June 25, 2008	October 1, 2024	NDP		Métis
	Jennifer Campeau (born 1973)	Saskatoon Fairview	November 7, 2011	July 2, 2017	Saskatchewan		First Nations (Anishinaabe)
	Greg Lawrence (born 1966)	Moose Jaw Wakamow	November 7, 2011	October 1, 2024	Saskatchewan		Métis
	Roger Parent (1953–2016)	Saskatoon Meewasin	November 7, 2011	November 29, 2016	Saskatchewan		Métis
	Lisa Lambert	Saskatoon Churchill-Wildwood	November 30, 2016	October 1, 2024	Saskatchewan		Métis
	Betty Nippi-Albright	Saskatoon Centre	October 26, 2020	Incumbent	NDP		First Nations (Saulteaux); First Nations (Cree)
	Jim Lemaigre	Athabasca	February 15, 2022	October 1, 2024	Saskatchewan		First Nations (Clearwater River Dene)
	Jordan McPhail	Cumberland	October 28, 2024	Incumbent	NDP		First Nations (Cree)
	Leroy Laliberte	Athabasca	October 28, 2024	Incumbent	NDP		Métis

=== Yukon ===
Portrait	MLA	Riding	Took office	Left office	Party	Ref.	Note
	Grafton Njootli (1947–1999)	Old Crow	November 20, 1978	June 6, 1982	Conservative		First Nations (Vuntut Gwitchin)
	Kathie Nukon (born 1947)	Old Crow	June 7, 1982	May 14, 1985	Conservative		First Nations (Vuntut Gwitchin)
	Margaret Commodore (born 1932)	Whitehorse North Centre; Whitehorse Centre	June 7, 1982	September 30, 1996	NDP		First Nations (Sto:lo)
	Dave Porter (born 1953)	Watson Lake	June 7, 1982	February 19, 1989	NDP		First Nations (Kaska)
	Norma Kassi (born 1954)	Old Crow	May 13, 1985	October 18, 1992	NDP		First Nations (Vuntut Gwitchin)
	Danny Joe (born 1929)	Mayo-Tatchun	February 2, 1987	September 29, 1996	NDP		First Nations (Tutchone)
	Johnny Abel (1947–1995)	Vuntut Gwitchin	October 19, 1992	October 13, 1995	Yukon		First Nations (Vuntut Gwitchin)
	Esau Schafer (born 1952)	Vuntut Gwitchin	February 5, 1996	September 29, 1996	Yukon		First Nations (Vuntut Gwitchin)
	Robert Bruce (born 1940)	Vuntut Gwitchin	September 30, 1996	April 16, 2000	NDP		First Nations (Vuntut Gwitchin)
	Eric Fairclough (born 1962)	Mayo-Tatchun	September 30, 1996	March 1, 2006	NDP		First Nations (Tutchone)
	Eric Fairclough (born 1962)	Mayo-Tatchun	March 1, 2006	October 10, 2011	Liberal		First Nations (Tutchone)
	Dave Keenan (born 1951)	Ross River-Southern Lakes	September 30, 1996	November 3, 2002	NDP		First Nations (Tlingit)
	Wayne Jim (born 1961)	McIntyre-Takhini	April 17, 2000	November 3, 2002	Liberal		First Nations (Tutchone)
	Lorraine Peter (born 1956)	Vuntut Gwitchin	April 17, 2000	October 9, 2006	NDP		First Nations (Vuntut Gwitchin)
	Darius Elias (1972–2021)	Vuntut Gwitchin	October 10, 2006	August 17, 2012	Liberal		First Nations (Vuntut Gwitchin)
	Darius Elias (1972–2021)	Vuntut Gwitchin	August 17, 2012	July 8, 2013	Independent		First Nations (Vuntut Gwitchin)
	Darius Elias (1972–2021)	Vuntut Gwitchin	July 8, 2013	November 6, 2016	Yukon		First Nations (Vuntut Gwitchin)
	Kevin Barr	Mount Lorne-Southern Lakes	October 11, 2011	November 7, 2016	NDP		First Nations (Anishinaabe)
	Jeanie Dendys	Mountainview	November 7, 2016	November 3, 2025	Liberal		First Nations (Tahltan)
	Geraldine Van Bibber (born 1951)	Porter Creek North	November 7, 2016	November 3, 2025	Yukon		First Nations (Vuntut Gwitchin)
	Pauline Frost	Vuntut Gwitchin	November 7, 2016	April 12, 2021	Liberal		First Nations (Vuntut Gwitchin)
	Annie Blake	Vuntut Gwitchin	April 12, 2021	November 3, 2025	NDP		First Nations (Vuntut Gwitchin)
	Jeremy Harper	Mayo-Tatchun	April 12, 2021	November 3, 2025	Liberal		First Nations (Northern Tutchone)
	Doris Anderson	Porter Creek North	November 3, 2025	Incumbent	Yukon		First Nations (Ta'an Kwach'an)
	Cory Bellmore	Mayo-Tatchun	November 3, 2025	Incumbent	Yukon		First Nations (Northern Tutchone)
	Linda Moen	Mountainview	November 3, 2025	Incumbent	NDP		First Nations (Kwanlin Dün)
	Tyler Porter	Southern Lakes	November 3, 2025	Incumbent	Yukon		First Nations (Kaska Dena)

== Indigenous politicians by assembly composition ==
=== House of Commons ===
Parliament	Years	Total	Bloc	Conservative	Liberal	NDP	Other	Independent
1st	1867–1872	2	-	2 / 100	0 / 62	-	0 / 18	-
2nd	1872–1874	1	-	0 / 100	0 / 95	-	-	1 / 5
3rd	1874–1878	0	-	0 / 65	0 / 129	-	-	0 / 12
4th	1878–1882	0	-	0 / 134	0 / 63	-	-	0 / 9
5th	1882–1887	0	-	0 / 133	0 / 73	-	-	0 / 5
6th	1887–1891	0	-	0 / 123	0 / 79	-	0 / 1	0 / 10
7th	1891–1896	0	-	0 / 117	0 / 90	-	0 / 1	0 / 6
8th	1896–1900	0	-	0 / 86	0 / 117	-	0 / 4	0 / 6
9th	1900–1904	0	-	0 / 79	0 / 128	-	-	0 / 6
10th	1904–1908	0	-	0 / 75	0 / 137	-	-	0 / 2
11th	1908–1911	0	-	0 / 85	0 / 133	-	0 / 1	0 / 2
12th	1911–1917	0	-	0 / 132	0 / 85	-	0 / 1	0 / 3
13th	1917–1921	0	-	0 / 153	0 / 82	-	-	-
14th	1921–1925	0	-	0 / 49	0 / 118	0 / 3	0 / 61	0 / 4
15th	1925–1926	0	-	0 / 115	0 / 100	0 / 2	0 / 24	0 / 4
16th	1926–1930	0	-	0 / 91	0 / 116	0 / 4	0 / 31	0 / 3
17th	1930–1935	0	-	0 / 135	0 / 89	0 / 2	0 / 15	0 / 4
18th	1935–1940	0	-	0 / 39	0 / 171	0 / 7	0 / 23	0 / 3
19th	1940–1945	0	-	0 / 39	0 / 179	0 / 8	0 / 15	0 / 4
20th	1945–1949	1	-	0 / 67	1 / 118	0 / 28	0 / 17	0 / 16
21st	1949–1953	1	-	0 / 41	1 / 191	0 / 13	0 / 12	0 / 5
22nd	1953–1957	0	-	0 / 51	0 / 169	0 / 23	0 / 17	0 / 5
23rd	1957–1958	0	-	0 / 112	0 / 105	0 / 25	0 / 19	0 / 4
24th	1958–1962	0	-	0 / 208	0 / 48	0 / 8	0 / 1	-
25th	1962–1963	1	-	0 / 116	1 / 99	0 / 19	0 / 31	-
26th	1963–1965	2	-	1 / 95	1 / 128	0 / 17	0 / 25	-
27th	1965–1968	1	-	0 / 97	1 / 131	0 / 21	0 / 14	0 / 2
28th	1968–1972	1	-	0 / 72	1 / 154	0 / 22	0 / 15	0 / 1
29th	1972–1974	2	-	0 / 107	1 / 109	1 / 31	0 / 15	0 / 2
30th	1974–1979	2	-	0 / 95	1 / 141	1 / 16	0 / 11	0 / 1
31st	1979–1980	1	-	0 / 136	0 / 114	1 / 26	0 / 6	-
32nd	1980–1984	2	-	0 / 103	1 / 147	1 / 32	-	-
33rd	1984–1988	2	-	1 / 211	0 / 40	1 / 30	-	-
34th	1988–1993	3	-	1 / 169	2 / 83	0 / 43	-	0 / 1
35th	1993–1997	4	0 / 54	0 / 2	4 / 177	0 / 9	0 / 52	-
36th	1997–2000	4	0 / 44	0 / 20	4 / 155	0 / 21	0 / 60	-
37th	2000–2004	4	0 / 38	0 / 12	4 / 172	0 / 13	0 / 66	-
38th	2004–2006	5	1 / 54	0 / 99	4 / 135	0 / 19	-	0 / 1
39th	2006–2008	6	0 / 51	2 / 124	4 / 103	0 / 29	-	0 / 1
40th	2008–2011	5	0 / 49	4 / 143	1 / 77	0 / 37	-	0 / 1
41st	2011–2015	8	0 / 4	5 / 166	1 / 34	2 / 103	0 / 1	-
42nd	2015–2019	10	0 / 10	1 / 99	7 / 184	2 / 44	0 / 1	-
43rd	2019–2021	11	0 / 32	2 / 121	6 / 157	2 / 24	0 / 3	1 / 1
44th	2021–current	12	0 / 32	3 / 119	6 / 160	3 / 25	0 / 2	-

=== Alberta Legislative Assembly ===
Parliament	Years	Ind. total	Conservative	Liberal	NDP	Wildrose	Other	Independent
22nd	1989–1993	2	2 / 61	0 / 10	0 / 17	-	-	-
23rd	1993–1997	3	3 / 52	0 / 33	-	-	-	-
24th	1997–2001	3	3 / 64	0 / 19	0 / 3	-	-	-
25th	2001–2004	3	3 / 75	0 / 7	0 / 2	-	-	-
26th	2004–2008	4	4 / 63	0 / 17	0 / 4	0 / 1	-	-
27th	2008–2012	3	3 / 69	0 / 10	0 / 2	0 / 4	-	-
28th	2012–2015	3	3 / 65	0 / 5	0 / 4	0 / 17	-	-
29th	2015–2019	0	0 / 29	0 / 1	0 / 54	-	0 / 3	0 / 3
30th	2019–2023	0	0 / 63	-	0 / 24	-	-	-
31st	2023–current	3	1 / 49	-	2 / 38	-	-	-

=== British Columbia Legislative Assembly ===
Parliament	Years	Ind. total	BC United/Liberal	Conservative	NDP	Other	Independent
22nd	1949–1952	1	0 / 39	-	1 / 7	-	-
23rd	1952–1953	1	0 / 6	0 / 4	1 / 18	0 / 23	-
24th	1953–1956	1	0 / 4	0 / 1	1 / 14	0 / 28	-
25th	1956–1960	1	0 / 2	-	1 / 10	0 / 39	-
26th	1960–1963	1	0 / 4	-	1 / 16	0 / 32	-
27th	1963–1966	1	0 / 5	-	1 / 14	0 / 33	-
28th	1966–1969	1	0 / 6	-	1 / 16	0 / 33	-
29th	1969–1972	1	0 / 5	-	1 / 12	0 / 38	-
30th	1972–1975	1	0 / 5	0 / 2	0 / 38	1 / 10	-
31st	1975–1979	1	0 / 1	0 / 1	0 / 19	1 / 37	-
32nd	1979–1983	0	-	-	0 / 26	0 / 32	-
33rd	1983–1986	0	-	-	0 / 24	0 / 35	-
34th	1986–1991	0	-	-	0 / 28	0 / 47	-
35th	1991–1996	0	0 / 20	-	0 / 51	0 / 9	-
36th	1996–2001	0	0 / 36	-	0 / 39	0 / 3	-
37th	2001–2005	0	0 / 77	-	0 / 3	-	-
38th	2005–2009	1	0 / 46	-	1 / 35	-	-
39th	2009–2013	2	1 / 50	-	1 / 37	0 / 1	0 / 1
40th	2013–2017	3	1 / 50	-	2 / 36	0 / 1	0 / 1
41st	2017–2020	4	1 / 42	-	2 / 41	1 / 3	0 / 1
42nd	2020–2024	3	1 / 28	-	1 / 57	1 / 2	0 / 1
43rd	2024-present	4	-	1 / 45	3 / 46	0 / 2	-

=== Manitoba Legislative Assembly ===
Parliament	Years	Ind. total	Conservative	Liberal	NDP	Other	Independent
1st	1870–1874	5	-	-	-	-	5 / 24
2nd	1874–1878	2	-	-	-	-	2 / 24
3rd	1878–1879	4	-	-	-	-	4 / 24
4th	1879–1883	3	2 / 6	0 / 2	-	1 / 11	0 / 5
5th	1883–1886	1	1 / 20	0 / 10	-	-	-
6th	1886–1888	0	0 / 20	0 / 15	-	-	-
7th	1888–1892	1	1 / 4	0 / 33	-	-	0 / 1
8th	1892–1896	0	0 / 9	0 / 28	-	0 / 2	0 / 1
9th	1896–1899	0	0 / 5	0 / 32	-	0 / 2	0 / 1
10th	1899–1903	0	0 / 18	0 / 17	-	0 / 5	-
11th	1903–1907	0	0 / 32	0 / 8	-	-	-
12th	1907–1910	0	0 / 28	0 / 13	-	-	-
13th	1910–1914	0	0 / 28	0 / 13	-	-	-
14th	1914–1920	0	0 / 28	0 / 20	-	-	0 / 1
15th	1915–1920	0	0 / 5	0 / 40	0 / 1	-	0 / 1
16th	1920–1922	0	-	0 / 21	0 / 11	0 / 12	0 / 3
17th	1922–1927	0	0 / 7	0 / 8	0 / 5	0 / 28	0 / 7
18th	1927–1932	0	0 / 15	0 / 7	0 / 3	0 / 29	0 / 1
19th	1932–1936	0	0 / 10	0 / 38	0 / 5	-	0 / 2
20th	1936–1941	0	0 / 16	0 / 23	0 / 7	0 / 6	0 / 3
21st	1941–1945	0	0 / 15	0 / 27	0 / 3	0 / 3	0 / 7
22nd	1945–1949	0	0 / 13	0 / 25	0 / 9	0 / 3	0 / 5
23rd	1949–1953	0	0 / 9	0 / 31	0 / 7	0 / 1	0 / 9
24th	1953–1958	1	0 / 12	1 / 35	0 / 5	0 / 3	0 / 2
25th	1958–1959	1	0 / 26	1 / 19	0 / 11	-	0 / 1
26th	1959–1962	0	0 / 36	0 / 11	0 / 10	-	-
27th	1962–1966	0	0 / 36	0 / 13	0 / 7	0 / 1	-
28th	1966–1969	0	0 / 31	0 / 14	0 / 11	0 / 1	-
29th	1969–1973	0	0 / 28	0 / 5	0 / 22	0 / 1	-
30th	1973–1977	1	0 / 21	0 / 5	1 / 31	-	-
31st	1977–1981	0	0 / 33	0 / 1	1 / 23	-	-
32nd	1981–1986	1	0 / 23	-	1 / 34	-	-
33rd	1986–1988	2	1 / 26	0 / 1	1 / 30	-	-
34th	1988–1990	2	1 / 25	0 / 20	1 / 12	-	-
35th	1990–1995	4	1 / 30	0 / 7	3 / 20	-	-
36th	1995–1999	4	1 / 31	0 / 3	3 / 23	-	-
37th	1999–2003	4	1 / 24	0 / 1	3 / 32	-	-
38th	2003–2007	4	1 / 20	0 / 2	3 / 35	-	-
39th	2007–2011	3	0 / 19	0 / 2	3 / 36	-	-
40th	2011–2016	4	0 / 19	0 / 1	4 / 37	-	-
41st	2016–2019	9	3 / 40	1 / 3	5 / 14	-	-
42nd	2019–2023	7	2 / 36	0 / 3	5 / 18	-	-
43rd	2023-present	11	1 / 22	0 / 1	10 / 34		

=== New Brunswick Legislative Assembly ===
Parliament	Years	Ind. total	Conservative	Liberal	NDP	Green	People's Alliance	Independent
55th	2003–2006	1	0 / 28	1 / 26	0 / 1	-	-	-
56th	2006–2010	1	0 / 26	1 / 29	-	-	-	-
57th	2010–2014	0	0 / 42	0 / 13	-	-	-	-
58th	2014–2018	0	0 / 21	0 / 27	-	0 / 1	-	-
59th	2018–2020	0	0 / 21	0 / 27	-	0 / 3	0 / 3	-
60th	2020–current	0	0 / 27	0 / 17	-	0 / 3	0 / 2	-

=== Nova Scotia Legislative Assembly ===
No Indigenous representation.

=== Ontario Legislative Assembly ===
Parliament	Years	Ind. total	Conservative	Liberal	NDP	Other	Independent
35th	1990–1995	1	0 / 22	0 / 39	1 / 74	-	-
36th	1995–1999	1	0 / 82	0 / 33	0 / 19	-	1 / 1
37th	1999–2003	1	0 / 62	1 / 37	0 / 10	-	-
38th	2003–2007	1	0 / 28	1 / 74	0 / 11	-	-
39th	2007–2011	1	0 / 27	1 / 75	0 / 10	-	-
40th	2011–2014	1	0 / 39	1 / 56	0 / 21	-	-
41st	2014–2018	1	0 / 32	1 / 60	0 / 21	0 / 1	-
42nd	2018–2022	3	0 / 76	0 / 7	3 / 40	0 / 1	-
43rd	2022–current	2	0 / 83	0 / 8	2 / 31	0 / 1	0 / 1

=== Prince Edward Island ===
No Indigenous representation.

=== Yukon Legislative Assembly ===
Parliament	Years	Ind. total	Yukon (Conservative)	Liberal	NDP	Independent
28th	1978–1982	1	1 / 11	0 / 2	0 / 1	0 / 2
29th	1982–1985	2	1 / 10	-	1 / 6	-
30th	1985–1989	3	0 / 6	0 / 2	3 / 8	-
31st	1989–1992	2	0 / 7	-	2 / 9	-
32nd	1992–1996	3	2 / 7	0 / 1	1 / 6	0 / 3
33rd	1996–2000	3	0 / 3	0 / 3	3 / 11	-
34th	2000–2002	4	0 / 1	1 / 10	3 / 6	-
35th	2002–2006	2	0 / 12	0 / 1	2 / 5	-
36th	2006–2011	2	0 / 10	2 / 5	0 / 3	-
37th	2011–2016	2	1 / 11	0 / 2	1 / 6	-
38th	2016–2021	3	1 / 6	2 / 11	0 / 2	-
39th	2021–current	4	1 / 8	2 / 8	1 / 3	-

== See also ==
- List of electoral firsts in Canada
- List of Jewish Canadian politicians
- List of visible minority politicians in Canada
- List of Native American politicians
