= List of Yukon by-elections =

The list of Yukon by-elections includes every by-election held in the Canadian territory of Yukon. By-elections occur whenever there is a vacancy in the Legislative Assembly, although an imminent general election may allow the vacancy to remain until the dissolution of parliament.

== Causes ==
A by-election occurs whenever there is a vacancy in the Yukon legislature. Vacancies can occur for the following reasons:

- Death of a member.
- Resignation of a member.
- Voided results
- Expulsion from the legislature.
- Ineligibility to sit.

When there is a vacancy, a by-election must be called within six months.

== 35th Legislative Assembly of Yukon 2021–2025 ==
no by-elections

== 34th Legislative Assembly of Yukon 2016–2021 ==
no by-elections

== 33rd Legislative Assembly of Yukon 2011–2016 ==
no by-elections

== 32nd Legislative Assembly of Yukon 2006–2011 ==
By-election	Date	Incumbent	Party	Winner	Party	Cause	Retained
Whitehorse Centre	December 13, 2010	Todd Hardy	New Democratic	Elizabeth Hanson	New Democratic	Death	Yes

== 31st Legislative Assembly of Yukon 2002–2006 ==
By-election	Date	Incumbent	Party	Winner	Party	Cause	Retained
Copperbelt	November 21, 2005	Haakon Arntzen	Independent	Arthur Mitchell	Liberal	Resignation after being criminally charged with the sexual assault of two teenage girls in the 1970s when he was convicted.	No

== 30th Legislative Assembly of Yukon 2000–2002 ==
By-election	Date	Incumbent	Party	Winner	Party	Cause	Retained
Faro	November 27, 2000	Trevor Harding	New Democratic	Jim McLachlan	Liberal	Resignation	No

== 29th Legislative Assembly of Yukon 1996–2000 ==
By-election	Date	Incumbent	Party	Winner	Party	Cause	Retained
Lake Laberge	October 25, 1999	Doug Livingston	New Democratic	Pam Buckway	Liberal	Resignation	No
Vuntut Gwitchin	April 1, 1997	Esau Schafer	Yukon Party	Robert Bruce	New Democratic	Void Election	No

== 28th Legislative Assembly of Yukon 1992–1996 ==
By-election	Date	Incumbent	Party	Winner	Party	Cause	Retained
Whitehorse West	February 5, 1996	Tony Penikett	New Democratic	David Sloan	New Democratic	Resignation	Yes
Vuntut Gwitchin	February 5, 1996	Johnny Abel	Yukon Party	Esau Schafer	Yukon Party	Death (boating accident)	Yes

== 27th Legislative Assembly of Yukon 1989–1992 ==
no by-elections

== 26th Legislative Assembly of Yukon 1985–1989 ==
By-election	Date	Incumbent	Party	Winner	Party	Cause	Retained
Tatchun	February 2, 1987	Roger Coles	Liberal	Danny Joe	New Democratic	Resignation after pleading guilty to cocaine trafficking, and was sentenced to three years in prison.	No
Whitehorse Porter Creek West	February 10, 1986	Andy Philipsen	Progressive Conservative	Alan Nordling	Progressive Conservative	Death	Yes

== 25th Legislative Assembly of Yukon 1982–1985 ==
no by-elections

== 24th Legislative Assembly of Yukon 1978–1982 ==
By-election	Date	Incumbent	Party	Winner	Party	Cause	Retained
Whitehorse South Centre	October 13, 1981	Dr. Jack Hibberd	Progressive Conservative	Roger Kimmerly	New Democratic	Resignation	No
Whitehorse Riverdale South	March 9, 1981	Iain MacKay	Liberal	Ron Veale	Liberal	Resignation	Yes

== See also ==
- List of federal by-elections in Canada
