= 28th Legislature of Yukon =

Legislature of Yukon, Canada, 1992–1996

The 28th Yukon Legislative Assembly convened in 1992. The Yukon Party (formerly the Progressive Conservative Party which had renamed in 1991) led by John Ostashek formed a minority government.

== Membership in the 28th Assembly ==
The following members were elected to the 28th Yukon Legislative Assembly in the general election of 1992:

Member	Party	Electoral district	First elected / previously elected	No. of terms
Trevor Harding	NDP	Faro	1992	1st term
David Millar	Yukon Party	Klondike	1992	1st term
Bill Brewster	Yukon Party	Kluane	1982	4th term
Mickey Fisher	Yukon Party	Lake Laberge	1992	1st term
Danny Joe	NDP	Mayo-Tatchun	1987	3rd term
Piers McDonald	NDP	McIntyre-Takhini	1982	4th term
Lois Moorcroft	NDP	Mount Lorne	1992	1st term
John Ostashek	Yukon Party	Porter Creek North	1992	1st term
Alan Nordling	Independent Alliance	Porter Creek South	1986 (Note: First elected as a Progressive Conservative)	3rd term
Doug Phillips	Yukon Party	Riverdale North	1985	3rd term
Bea Firth	Independent Alliance	Riverdale South	1982	4th term
Jack Cable	Liberal	Riverside	1992	1st term
Willard Phelps	Independent Alliance	Ross River-Southern Lakes	1974, (Note: Whitehorse Riverdale) 1985 (Note: Re-elected as a Progressive Conservative)	4th term*
Johnny Abel	Yukon Party	Vuntut Gwitchin	1992	1st term
Esau Schafer (1996)	Yukon Party	Vuntut Gwitchin	1996	1st term
John Devries	Yukon Party	Watson Lake	1989	2nd term
Margaret Commodore	NDP	Whitehorse Centre	1982	4th term
Tony Penikett	NDP	Whitehorse West	1978	5th term
David Sloan (1996)	NDP	Whitehorse West	1996	1st term

=== Membership changes ===
Changes in seats held (1992-1996)
Seat	Before				Change		
Seat	Date	Member	Party	Reason	Date	Member	Party
Whitehorse West	September 27, 1995	Tony Penikett	█ New Democratic	Resignation	February 5, 1996	David Sloan	█ New Democratic
Vuntut Gwitchin	October 13, 1995	Johnny Abel	█ Yukon Party	Death	February 5, 1996	Esau Schafer	█ Yukon Party

== By-elections ==
2 by-elections was held in the districts of Whitehorse West and Vuntut Gwitchin in 1996.

Electoral district	Member elected	Affiliation	Election date	Reason
Whitehorse West	David Sloan	NDP	February 5, 1996	Resignation
Vuntut Gwitchin	Esau Schafer	Yukon Party	February 5, 1996	Death (boating accident)
