= 29th Legislature of Yukon =

Legislature of Yukon, Canada, 1996–2000

The 29th Yukon Legislative Assembly convened in 1996. The NDP led by Piers McDonald formed a majority government.

== Membership in the 29th Assembly ==
The following members were elected to the 29th Yukon Legislative Assembly in the general election of 1996:

Member	Party	Electoral district	First elected / previously elected	No. of terms
Trevor Harding	NDP	Faro	1992	2nd term
Peter Jenkins	Yukon Party	Klondike	1996	1st term
Gary McRobb	NDP	Kluane	1996	1st term
Doug Livingston	NDP	Lake Laberge	1996	1st term
Pam Buckway (1999)	Liberal	Lake Laberge	1999	1st term
Eric Fairclough	NDP	Mayo-Tatchun	1996	1st term
Piers McDonald	NDP	McIntyre-Takhini	1982	5th term
Lois Moorcroft	NDP	Mount Lorne	1992	2nd term
John Ostashek	Yukon Party	Porter Creek North	1992	2nd term
Pat Duncan	Liberal	Porter Creek South	1996	1st term
Doug Phillips	Yukon Party	Riverdale North	1985	4th term
Sue Edelman	Liberal	Riverdale South	1996	1st term
Jack Cable	Liberal	Riverside	1992	2nd term
Dave Keenan	NDP	Ross River-Southern Lakes	1996	1st term
Robert Bruce	NDP	Vuntut Gwitchin	1996	1st term
Dennis Fentie	NDP	Watson Lake	1996	1st term
Todd Hardy	NDP	Whitehorse Centre	1996	1st term
David Sloan	NDP	Whitehorse West	1996	2nd term

=== Membership changes ===
Changes in seats held (1996-2000)
Seat	Before				Change		
Seat	Date	Member	Party	Reason	Date	Member	Party
Lake Laberge	August 30, 1999	Doug Livingston	█ New Democratic	Resignation	October 25, 1999	Pam Buckway	█ Liberal

- Liberals form Official Opposition, following Lake Laberge by-election.

== By-elections ==
2 by-elections was held in the districts of Whitehorse West and Vuntut Gwitchin in 1997 and 1999.

Electoral district	Member elected	Affiliation	Election date	Reason
Vuntut Gwitchin	Robert Bruce	NDP	April 1, 1997	Void Election
Lake Laberge	Pam Buckway	Liberal	October 25, 1999	Death (boating accident)
