= 2000 Yukon general election =

Canadian territorial election

← 1996	April 17, 2000	2002 →

17 seats of the Yukon Legislative Assembly 9 seats needed for a majority
- Turnout: 78.58% (▼1.00pp)
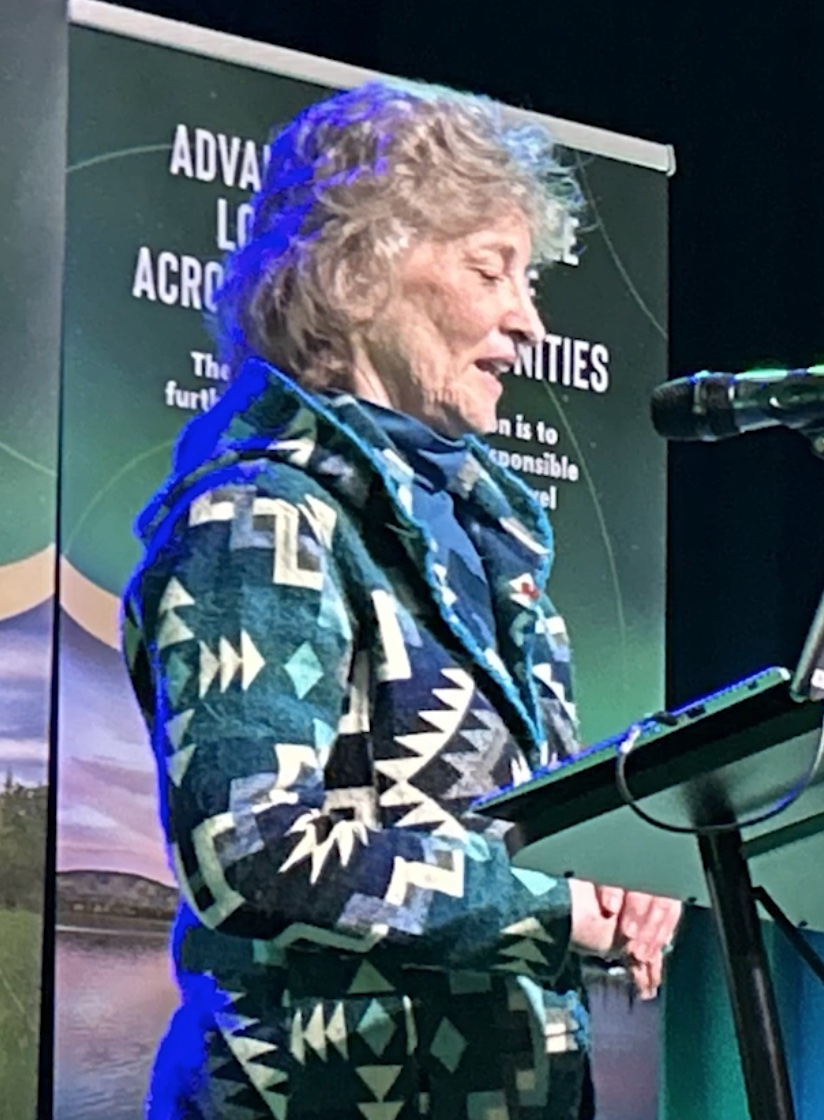
	First party	Second party	Third party
			YP
Leader	Pat Duncan	Piers McDonald	John Ostashek
Party	Liberal	New Democratic	Yukon Party
Leader's seat	Porter Creek South	McIntyre-Takhini (lost re-election)	Porter Creek North (lost re-election)
Last election	3	11	3
Seats won	10	6	1
Seat change	▲7	▼5	▼2
Popular vote	6,119	4,677	3,466
Percentage	42.90%	32.80%	24.30%
Swing	▲18.96pp	▼7.01pp	▼6.06pp
- Popular vote by riding. As this is an FPTP election, seat totals are not determined by popular vote, but instead by the result in each riding. Riding names are listed at the bottom.
Government Leader before election
Piers McDonald
New Democratic
Premier after election
Pat Duncan
Liberal

The 2000 Yukon general election was held on April 17, 2000 to elect members of the 30th Yukon Legislative Assembly in the Yukon Territory in Canada. The incumbent NDP government was defeated by the Liberal Party, which formed a majority government.

== Standings ==
Summary of the 2000 Legislative Assembly of Yukon election results
Party	Party leader	Candidates	Seats				Popular vote		
Party	Party leader	Candidates	1996	Dissol.	2000	Change	#	%	Change
Liberal	Pat Duncan	17	3	4	10	+7	6,119	42.90%	+18.96%
New Democratic	Piers McDonald	17	11	10	6	-5	4,677	32.80%	-7.01%
Yukon Party	John Ostashek	15	3	3	1	-2	3,466	24.30%	-6.06%
Total		49	17	17	17		14,262	100.00%	

Popular vote
Liberal	42.90%
New Democratic	32.80%
Yukon Party	24.30%

Seats summary
Liberal	58.82%
New Democratic	35.29%
Yukon Party	5.88%

== Member Changes from Previous Election ==
Changes in seats held (1996-2000)
Seat	Before				Change		
Seat	Date	Member	Party	Reason	Date	Member	Party
Lake Laberge	August 30, 1999	Doug Livingston	█ New Democratic	Resignation	October 25, 1999	Pam Buckway	█ Liberal

- Liberals form Official Opposition, following Lake Laberge by-election.

== Incumbents not Running for Reelection ==
The Yukon Legislature after the 2000 election.

The following MLAs had announced that they would not be running in the 2000 election:

Liberal Party

- Jack Cable (Riverside)

New Democratic Party

- Robert Bruce (Vuntut Gwitchin)

Yukon Party

- Doug Phillips (Riverdale North)

== Results by Riding ==
Bold indicates party leaders
† - denotes a retiring incumbent MLA

Electoral district	Candidates				Incumbent
Electoral district	Yukon	Liberal	NDP	Other	Incumbent
Faro		Jim McLachlan; 53	Trevor Harding; 177		Trevor Harding
Klondike	Peter Jenkins; 424	Stuart Schmidt; 397	Aedes Scheer; 249		Peter Jenkins
Kluane	Charlie Eikland; 208	Gerald Brown; 113	Gary McRobb; 405		Gary McRobb
Lake Laberge	Roger Gallagher; 363	Pam Buckway; 514	Gary LeGoffe; 182		Pam Buckway
McIntyre-Takhini	John Edzerza; 265	Wayne Jim; 376	**Piers McDonald**; 338		**Piers McDonald**
Mayo-Tatchun		Wilf Tuck; 277	Eric Fairclough; 446		Eric Fairclough
Mount Lorne	Ken Gabb; 269	Cynthia Tucker; 563	Lois Moorcroft; 422		Lois Moorcroft
Porter Creek North	**John Ostashek**; 323	Don Roberts; 504	Sidney Maddison; 114		**John Ostashek**
Porter Creek South	Larry W Carlyle; 235	**Pat Duncan**; 607	Mark Dupuis; 103		**Pat Duncan**
Riverdale North	Daphne White; 172	Dale Eftoda; 454	Rachael Lewis; 233		Doug Phillips†
Riverdale South	Ginny Macdonald; 205	Sue Edelman; 422	Heather Finton; 237		Sue Edelman
Riverside	Michael Wienert; 100	Scott Kent; 359	Jasbir Randhawa; 202		Jack Cable†
Ross River-Southern Lakes	Ed Hall; 150	Dorothy John; 187	Dave Keenan; 357		Dave Keenan
Vuntut Gwitchin	Kathie Nukon; 53	Esau Schafer; 61	Lorraine Netro; 69		Robert Bruce†
Watson Lake	Mickey Thomas; 144	Isaac Wood; 272	Dennis Fentie; 434		Dennis Fentie
Whitehorse Centre	Vicki Durrant; 130	Mike McLarnon; 312	Todd Hardy; 229		Todd Hardy
Whitehorse West	Elaine Taylor; 425	Dennis Schneider; 621	David Sloan; 480		David Sloan
