= 1996 Yukon general election =

Canadian territorial election

← 1992	September 30, 1996	2000 →

17 seats of the Yukon Legislative Assembly 9 seats needed for a majority
- Turnout: 79.58% (▲2.04pp)
	First party	Second party	Third party
		YP	YLP
Leader	Piers McDonald	John Ostashek	Ken Taylor
Party	New Democratic	Yukon Party	Liberal
Leader since	1995	1992	1995
Leader's seat	McIntyre-Takhini	Porter Creek North	Ran in Mount Lorne (lost)
Last election	6	7	1
Seats won	11	3	3
Seat change	▲5	▼4	▲2
Popular vote	5,760	4,392	3,464
Percentage	39.81%	30.36%	23.94%
Swing	▲4.73pp	▼5.52pp	▲7.84pp
- Popular vote by riding. As this is an FPTP election, seat totals are not determined by popular vote, but instead by the result in each riding. Riding names are listed at the bottom.
Government Leader before election
John Ostashek
Yukon Party
Premier after election
Piers McDonald
New Democratic

The 1996 Yukon general election was held on September 30, 1996 to elect the seventeen members of the 29th Yukon Legislative Assembly in Yukon Territory, Canada. The governing Yukon Party, a conservative party, was defeated by the social democratic New Democratic Party (NDP). The NDP formed a new majority government of the territory with 11 seats. Party leader Piers McDonald became Premier of Yukon. The Yukon Party and the centrist Yukon Liberal Party each won three seats, although Liberal leader Ken Taylor failed to be elected.

== Results by party ==
Summary of the 1996 Legislative Assembly of Yukon election results
Party	Party leader	Candidates	Seats				Popular vote		
Party	Party leader	Candidates	1992	Dissol.	1996	Change	#	%	Change
New Democratic	Piers McDonald	16	6	6	11	+5	5,760	39.81%	+4.73%
Yukon Party	John Ostashek	15	7	7	3	-4	4,392	30.36%	-5.52%
Liberal	Ken Taylor	16	1	1	3	+2	3,464	23.94%	+7.84%
Independent		7	3	3	0	-3	852	5.89%	N/A
Total		54	17	17	17		14,468	100.00%	

Popular vote
New Democratic	39.81%
Yukon Party	30.36%
Liberal	23.94%
Independent	5.89%

Seats summary
New Democratic	64.70%
Yukon Party	17.65%
Liberal	17.65%

== Member Changes from Previous Election ==
Changes in seats held (1992-1996)
Seat	Before				Change		
Seat	Date	Member	Party	Reason	Date	Member	Party
Whitehorse West	September 27, 1995	Tony Penikett	█ New Democratic	Resignation	February 5, 1996	David Sloan	█ New Democratic
Vuntut Gwitchin	October 13, 1995	Johnny Abel	█ Yukon Party	Death	February 5, 1996	Esau Schafer	█ Yukon Party

The Yukon Legislature after the 1996 election.

== Incumbents not Running for Reelection ==
The following MLAs had announced that they would not be running in the 1996 election:

Independent

- Bea Firth (Riverdale South)

New Democratic Party

- Danny Joe (Mayo-Tatchun)
- Margaret Commodore (Whitehorse Centre)

Yukon Party

- Bill Brewster (Kluane)
- David Millar (Klondike)
- John Devries (Watson Lake)

== Riding Results ==
Bold indicates party leaders
† - denotes a retiring incumbent MLA

Electoral district	Candidates				Incumbent
Electoral district	NDP	Yukon	Liberal	Independent	Incumbent
Faro	Trevor Harding; 530		Ed Peake; 29		Trevor Harding
Klondike	Tim Gerberding; 372	Peter Jenkins; 603	Glen Everitt; 96	John Cramp; 21	David Millar†
Kluane	Gary McRobb; 377	Olli Wirth; 144	John Farynowski; 177	Bonnie Lock; 66	Bill Brewster†
Lake Laberge	Doug Livingston; 328	Mickey Fisher; 325	Linda Biensch; 242	Mark Bain; 221	Mickey Fisher
McIntyre-Takhini	**Piers McDonald**; 441	Scott Howell; 251	Rosemary Couch; 182	Clinton Fraser; 21	**Piers McDonald**
Mayo-Tatchun	Eric Fairclough; 454	Michael McGinnis; 180			Danny Joe†
Mount Lorne	Lois Moorcroft; 484	Allan Doherty; 247	**Ken Taylor**; 299	Allen Luheck; 166	Lois Moorcroft
Porter Creek North	Luigi Zanasi; 191	**John Ostashek**; 403	Don Roberts; 384		**John Ostashek**
Porter Creek South	Mark Dupuis; 181	Alan Nordling; 397	Pat Duncan; 435		Alan Nordling
Riverdale North	Dave Stockdale; 347	Doug Phillips; 450	Flo Leblanc-Hutchinson; 146		Doug Phillips
Riverdale South		Barbara Toombs; 349	Sue Edelman; 476		Bea Firth†
Riverside	Gary Umbrich; 260	Ed Henderson; 160	Jack Cable; 267		Jack Cable
Ross River-Southern Lakes	Dave Keenan; 484		Bill Munroe; 49	Willard Phelps; 317	Willard Phelps
Vuntut Gwitchin	Robert Bruce; 69 *	Esau Schafer; 69	Shirlee Frost; 27		Esau Schafer
Watson Lake	Dennis Fentie; 442	Barrie Ravenhill; 249	Dave Kalles; 106	Mickey Thomas; 40	John Devries†
Whitehorse Centre	Todd Hardy; 328	Linda Dixon; 216	Jon Breen; 188		Margaret Commodore†
Whitehorse West	David Sloan; 486	Shelda Hutton; 323	Larry Bagnell; 383		David Sloan

- Because of the tie vote, Robert Bruce was declared elected after his name was drawn from a hat. He was later re-elected after a 1997 by-election after irregularities led to a court order invalidating the election.
