= Lorraine Peter =

Canadian politician

MLA for Vuntut Gwitchin
- In office April 17, 2000 – October 10, 2006
- Preceded by: Robert Bruce
- Succeeded by: Darius Elias

Personal details
- Born: Lorraine Netro; May 24, 1956 (age 70) Old Crow, Yukon
- Party: New Democrat

Lorraine Peter, (née Netro; May 24, 1956) is a Canadian politician. She represented the electoral district of Vuntut Gwitchin in the Yukon Legislative Assembly from 2000 to 2006. She was a member of the Yukon New Democratic Party.

She originally ran for election under her maiden name, but married during her first year in office and used her married name, Peter, for the remainder of her political career.

== Political career ==
Peter was first elected in the 2000 Yukon election in the Old Crow riding of Vuntut Gwitchin on behalf of the New Democrats. She succeeded former New Democrat MLA and Speaker of the Yukon Legislative Assembly, Robert Bruce. The New Democrat government was defeated in that campaign and Peter joined the Official Opposition.

In 2002, Peter was re-elected in Vuntut Gwitchin. During the 31st Legislative Assembly, Peter served as Official Opposition critic for the Departments of Environment and Justice, the Women's Directorate, and for First Nations issues. She was also Caucus Chair.

Peter was defeated by Yukon Liberal Darius Elias in the 2006 Yukon election. It was the first time the Liberals had won the riding of Vuntut Gwitchin.

== Personal life ==
A Gwich'in from Old Crow, Peter later served as a councillor and Deputy Chief of the Vuntut Gwitchin First Nation after leaving territorial politics. She is also a former member of the Board of Directors of Gwich'in Council International, a permanent participant of the Arctic Council.

== Electoral record ==
=== 2006 general election ===
Vuntut Gwitchin
Party	Candidate	Votes	%	±%
Liberal	Darius Elias	65	45.8%	+22.0%
NDP	Lorraine Peter	40	28.2%	-19.3%
Yukon Party	William Josie	37	26.0%	-2.7%
Total		142	100.0%	–

=== 2002 general election ===
Vuntut Gwitchin
Party	Candidate	Votes	%	±%
NDP	Lorraine Peter	68	47.5%	+9.8%
Yukon Party	Randall Tetlichi	41	28.7%	-0.3%
Liberal	Joe Tetlichi	34	23.8%	-9.5%
Total		143	100.0%	–

=== 2000 general election ===
Vuntut Gwitchin
Party	Candidate	Votes	%	±%
NDP	Lorraine Netro	69	37.7%	-17.3%
Liberal	Esau Schafer	61	33.3%	+33.3%
Yukon Party	Kathie Nukon	53	29.0%	-16.0%
Total		183	100.0%	–
