= Ken Taylor (politician) =

Canadian politician

Leader of the Yukon Liberal Party
- In office 1995–1997
- Preceded by: Jack Cable
- Succeeded by: Pat Duncan

Personal details
- Party: Liberal
- Occupation: teacher

Ken Taylor is a former Canadian politician, who was leader of the Yukon Liberal Party from 1995 to 1997.

Taylor worked as a teacher prior to being selected as party leader in 1995. He led the party into the 1996 general election, campaigning as a conciliatory alternative to the bitterly divided partisanship of Yukon politics. He was the party's candidate in the electoral district of Mount Lorne. The party won three seats on election day, but Taylor's was not one of them. Liberal MLA Jack Cable served as the party's interim leader in the Legislative Assembly of Yukon, although Taylor retained the organizational leadership until Pat Duncan was selected as his successor in 1997.

After the party won the 2000 election, Taylor was appointed by Dale Eftoda as the associate deputy minister of education. More recently, he has served as head of Trails Only Yukon, a group for owners of recreational all-terrain vehicles.
