= Vuntut Gwitchin =

Vuntut Gwitchin may refer to:

- The Gwich'in people living in the Yukon
- Vuntut Gwitchin First Nation in Old Crow, Yukon
- Vuntut Gwitchin (electoral district) of the Yukon Legislative Assembly

== See also ==
Vuntut National Park, a national park located in northern Yukon, Canada
