= 1996 Whitehorse West territorial by-election =

By-election in Canada

| ← 1992 | February 5, 1996 | Sep. 1996 → |

Electoral district of Whitehorse West
- Registered: 1,437
- Turnout: 71.19% (▼5.72%)
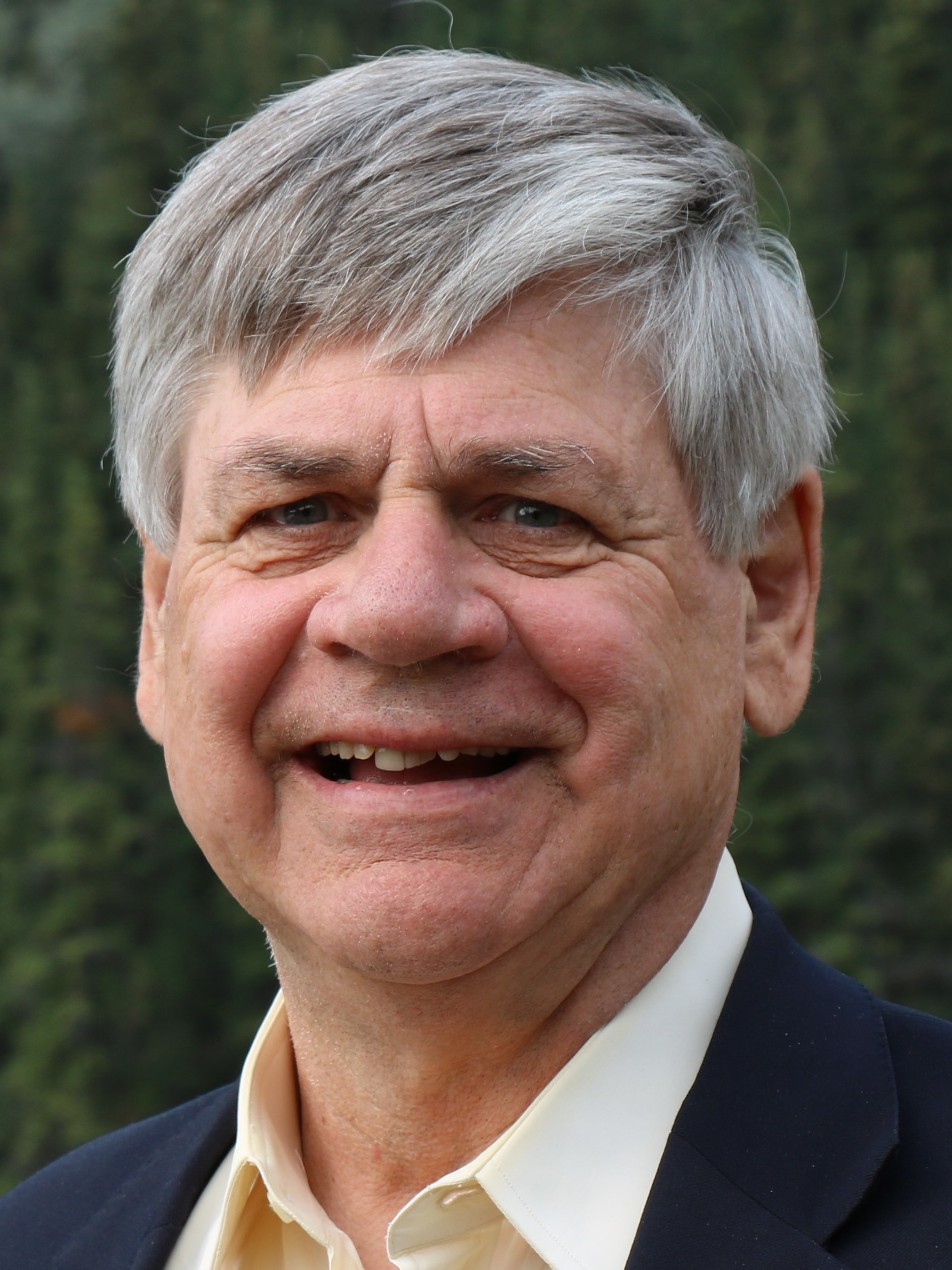
| | First party | Second party | Third party |
|---|---|---|---|
| | YNDP | | YP |
| Candidate | David Sloan | Larry Bagnell | Shelda Hutton |
| Party | New Democratic | Liberal | Yukon Party |
| Popular vote | 433 | 326 | 253 |
| Percentage | 42.3% | 31.9% | 24.7% |
| Swing | ▼3.3% | ▲14.8% | ▼10.1% |
MLA before election
Tony Penikett
New Democratic
Elected MLA
David Sloan
New Democratic

The 1996 Whitehorse West territorial by-election took place on February 5, 1996. The by-election was triggered by the resignation of the district's incumbent MLA Tony Penikett on September 27, 1995.

NDP candidate David Sloan won the by-election.

== Background ==
The previous MLA for Whitehorse West, Tony Penikett, resigned on September 27, 1995 to accept a position as a policy advisor in the office of Saskatchewan Premier Roy Romanow.

== Results ==
By-election: 1996
| Party | Candidate | Votes | % | ±% |
|---|---|---|---|---|
| NDP | Dave Sloan | 433 | 42.3% | -3.3% |
| Liberal | Larry Bagnell | 326 | 31.9% | +14.8% |
| Yukon Party | Shelda Hutton | 253 | 24.7% | -10.1% |
| Total | | 1023 | 100.0% | – |
