= Dana Tizya-Tramm =

Former Chief of the Vuntut Gwitchin First Nation (2019-2023) and environmental activist

- Born: 1987 (age 38–39); Old Crow, Yukon, Canada
- Occupations: Tribal leader; Environmentalist; Director
- Organization(s): Chief of the Vuntut Gwitchin First Nation (2019-2023), Director of Nadlii

Dana Tizya-Tramm (born 1987) is a Canadian and Vuntut Gwitchin indigenous leader, environmental activist, and AI executive who reached international prominence during his one term leading his tribe from 2019 to 2023, during which he declared a climate change emergency, pushed for environmental protections, and led his tribe through COVID. He currently serves on the First Nation School Board and serves as Director of Nadlii, a startup for artificial intelligence in culturally sensitive ways.

== Biography ==
Tizya-Tramm was raised in Whitehorse. He started taking drugs when he was 13. He soon also became a drug dealer, and faced further personal struggles including participating in violence, but in 2008 left for Vancouver, at which point he went through withdrawal and found enjoyment in working at a gelato shop. He went to Old Crow in 2013.

He was elected Chief of the Vuntut Gwitchin First Nation in November 2018. He declared a climate change emergency in 2019, making the Vuntut Gwitchin the first indigenous or first nation to declare a climate change emergency. He has been known for advocating for environmental protection, including protecting the Arctic National Wildlife Refuge from oil drilling, and led his nation towards a push for Net Zero by 2030, including through a major solar project to cover energy needs.

He led the Vuntut through COVID. During this time, he helped ensure vaccination and handled the response to a couple who traveled over 5 thousand miles to Old Crow, Yukon without quarantining.

He also founded and serves as Director of Nadlii, a startup utilizing artificial intelligence in culturally sensitive ways. Through Nadli, he is seeking to empower every First Nations tribe with a modular data center for artificial intelligence, which would be used for land-use planning.

Tizya-Tramm also serves as vice-chair of the First Nation School Board, which oversees 11 schools in the Yukon, mostly in Indigenous communities, a role he was first elected to in 2022 and re-elected to in 2025. He has called for better funding for First Nations schools from the Yukon government.

He was named to the Time 100 Next in 2022: his profile was written by Aryn Baker.

His wife, Zen Law, is Singaporean, and moved to Old Crow in April 2018 after just seven months of their relationship.
