= 30th Legislature of Yukon =

Legislature of Yukon, Canada, 2000–2002

The 30th Yukon Legislative Assembly convened in 2000. The Yukon Liberal Party led by Pat Duncan formed a majority government for the first time in Yukon's history.

== Membership in the 30th Assembly ==
The following members were elected to the 30th Yukon Legislative Assembly in the general election of 2000:

Member	Party	Electoral district	First elected / previously elected	No. of terms
Trevor Harding	NDP	Faro	1992	3rd term
Jim McLachlan (2000)	Liberal	Faro	1985, 2000	2nd term*
Peter Jenkins	Yukon Party	Klondike	1996	2nd term
Gary McRobb	NDP	Kluane	1996	2nd term
Pam Buckway	Liberal	Lake Laberge	1999	2nd term
Eric Fairclough	NDP	Mayo-Tatchun	1996	2nd term
Wayne Jim	Liberal	McIntyre-Takhini	2000	1st term
Wayne Jim	Independent	McIntyre-Takhini	2000	1st term
Cynthia Tucker	Liberal	Mount Lorne	2000	1st term
Don Roberts	Liberal	Porter Creek North	2000	1st term
Don Roberts	Independent	Porter Creek North	2000	1st term
Pat Duncan	Liberal	Porter Creek South	1996	2nd term
Dale Eftoda	Liberal	Riverdale North	2000	1st term
Sue Edelman	Liberal	Riverdale South	1996	2nd term
Scott Kent	Liberal	Riverside	2000	1st term
Dave Keenan	NDP	Ross River-Southern Lakes	1996	2nd term
Lorraine Peter	NDP	Vuntut Gwitchin	2000	1st term
Dennis Fentie	NDP	Watson Lake	1996	2nd term
Dennis Fentie	Yukon Party	Watson Lake	1996	2nd term
Mike McLarnon	Liberal	Whitehorse Centre	2000	1st term
Mike McLarnon	Independent	Whitehorse Centre	2000	1st term
Dennis Schneider	Liberal	Whitehorse West	2000	1st term

=== Membership changes ===
Changes in seats held (2000-2002)
Seat	Before				Change		
Seat	Date	Member	Party	Reason	Date	Member	Party
Faro	October 22, 2000	Trevor Harding	█ New Democratic	Resignation	November 27, 2000	Jim McLachlan	█ Liberal
McIntyre-Takhini	April 7, 2002	Wayne Jim	█ Liberal	Resigned from the Liberal Party caucus			█ Independent
Porter Creek North	April 7, 2002	Don Roberts	█ Liberal	Resigned from the Liberal Party caucus			█ Independent
Whitehorse Centre	April 7, 2002	Mike McLarnon	█ Liberal	Resigned from the Liberal Party caucus			█ Independent
Watson Lake	May 15, 2002	Dennis Fentie	█ New Democratic	Joined The Yukon Party			█ Yukon Party

== By-elections ==
A by-election was held in the district of Faro in 2000.

Electoral district	Member elected	Affiliation	Election date	Reason
Faro	Jim McLachlan	Liberal	November 27, 2000	Resignation
