= Darius Elias =

Canadian politician (1972–2021)

Leader of the Yukon Liberal Party (Interim)
- In office 2011–2012
- Preceded by: Arthur Mitchell
- Succeeded by: Sandy Silver

MLA for Vuntut Gwitchin
- In office 2006–2016
- Preceded by: Lorraine Peter
- Succeeded by: Pauline Frost

Personal details
- Born: March 17, 1972
- Died: February 17, 2021 (aged 48) Whitehorse, Yukon, Canada
- Party: Yukon Party (since July 8, 2013)
- Other political affiliations: Liberal (2006–2012); Independent (2012–2013)

Darius Mortimer Elias (March 17, 1972 – February 17, 2021) was a Canadian politician. He represented the rural Yukon electoral district of Vuntut Gwitchin in the Yukon Legislative Assembly from 2006–2016 as a member of both the Yukon Liberal Party and the Yukon Party.

He later served as Deputy Chief of the Vuntut Gwitchin First Nation. He resigned from that position June 12, 2020. Elias died February 17, 2021, at the age of 48.

== Political career ==
=== 32nd Legislative Assembly ===
Elias defeated two-term incumbent New Democrat Lorraine Peter in the Old Crow riding of Vuntut Gwitchin in 2006, ending the New Democrat's ten-year hold on the riding. His win marked the Yukon Liberals' first election win in that riding. Elias served as Official Opposition caucus chair, as well as Liberal critic for the Environment, Tourism and Culture, and the Women's Directorate portfolios.

=== 33rd Legislative Assembly ===
Elias was re-elected in the 2011 election, but that election saw the Yukon Liberals reduced to just two rural seats and third party status. Yukon Liberal leader Arthur Mitchell was defeated in his re-election campaign and resigned on election night. As the only Liberal MLA with experience (the other being then-rookie MLA Sandy Silver), Elias became interim leader of the party.

On August 17, 2012, Elias resigned from the post of interim Liberal leader and from the party caucus to sit as an Independent MLA. Eleven months later, on July 8, 2013, Elias crossed the floor to join the caucus of the governing Yukon Party. The move was controversial not only in that a former party leader defected; Elias' defection also granted the Yukon Party a majority on the Select Committee on Hydraulic Fracturing, which was struck to examine the role of fracking in the Yukon.

In 2014, he was fined $1,000 for refusing a breathalyzer test and using a cellphone while driving. His license was temporarily suspended and he publicly admitted to having an alcohol problem.

Elias was appointed Government House Leader and Caucus Chair of the Yukon Party caucus in 2015. Following the sudden resignation of David Laxton, Speaker of the Yukon Legislative Assembly, in May 2016, Elias briefly assumed the position of Deputy Speaker of the Legislative Assembly when his predecessor, Patti McLeod, became Speaker.

He announced his intention to seek re-election in the 2016 election, but was defeated by Liberal candidate Pauline Frost by seven votes.

== Personal life ==
Elias had a diploma in renewable resources management and was a former Vuntut National Park warden.

He was the son of Vuntut Gwitchin chief and former New Democrat MLA Norma Kassi.

== Election record ==
=== Yukon general election, 2016 ===
Vuntut Gwitchin
Party	Candidate	Votes	%	±%
Liberal	Pauline Frost	77	51.3%	-12.8%
Yukon Party	Darius Elias	70	46.7%	+10.8%
NDP	Skeeter Miller-Wright	3	2.0%	+2.0%
Total		145	100.0%	–

=== Yukon general election, 2011 ===
Vuntut Gwitchin
Party	Candidate	Votes	%	±%
Liberal	Darius Elias	93	64.1%	+18.1%
Yukon Party	Garry Njootli	52	35.9%	+9.9%
Total		145	100.0%	–

=== Yukon general election, 2006 ===
Vuntut Gwitchin
Party	Candidate	Votes	%	±%
Liberal	Darius Elias	65	45.8%	+22.0%
NDP	Lorraine Peter	40	28.2%	-19.3%
Yukon Party	William Josie	37	26.0%	-2.7%
Total		142	100.0%	–
