= Mickey Fisher =

Mickey Fisher may refer to:

- Mickey Fisher (politician)
- Mickey Fisher (screenwriter)
- Mickey Fisher (basketball)
