= Grafton Njootli =

Canadian politician

MLA for Old Crow
- In office 1978–1982
- Preceded by: first member
- Succeeded by: Kathie Nukon

Personal details
- Born: March 10, 1947 Old Crow, Yukon
- Died: c. June 20, 1999 (aged 52)
- Party: Progressive Conservative

Grafton Njootli (March 10, 1947 – c. June 20, 1999) was a Canadian politician. He represented the electoral district of Old Crow in the Yukon Legislative Assembly from 1978 to 1982 as a member of the Yukon Progressive Conservative Party.

Njootli, a community development and land claims advocate from the Vuntut Gwitchin First Nation, was the first aboriginal person elected to the Yukon Legislative Assembly. He was appointed Minister of Health and Human Resources in the government of Chris Pearson, but was forced to resign from the cabinet on May 25, 1979 after it was revealed that the Royal Canadian Mounted Police were investigating an allegation that he had physically assaulted a female cab driver.

He was subsequently appointed Deputy Speaker of the House on October 14, 1980, and served in that capacity until the dissolution of the legislature in 1982.

Njooti died in June 1999 in a boating accident. His funeral was held on June 22 of that year.
