= Kathie Nukon =

Canadian politician

MLA for Old Crow
- In office 1982–1985
- Preceded by: Grafton Njootli
- Succeeded by: Norma Kassi

Personal details
- Born: January 8, 1947 (age 79) Old Crow, Yukon
- Party: Progressive Conservative
- Occupation: bookkeeper

Kathie Emma Nukon (born January 8, 1947, in Old Crow, Yukon) is a former Canadian politician who represented the electoral district of Old Crow in the Yukon Legislative Assembly from 1982 to 1985. She was a member of the Yukon Progressive Conservative Party.

The daughter of a trading post owner in Old Crow, Nukon studied in Whitehorse to be a nursing assistant but worked mainly as an office manager and bookkeeper in her father's store until her election to the legislature.

She ran again as a Yukon Party candidate in the 2000 election but was not re-elected to the legislature.

Nukon also served on the band council of the Vuntut Gwitchin First Nation from 1996 to 1998 and from 2006 to 2012.
