= Brad Cathers =

Canadian politician

The Honourable Brad Cathers MLA
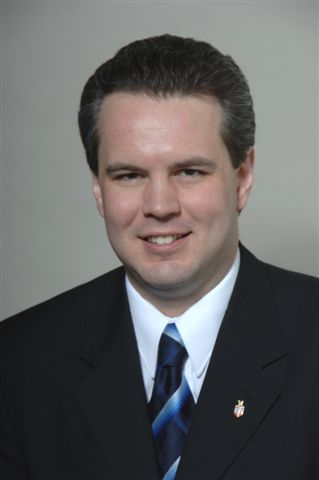

Minister of Health and Social Services
- Incumbent
- Assumed office November 22, 2025
- Premier: Currie Dixon
- Preceded by: Tracy-Anne McPhee

Member of the Yukon Legislative Assembly for Lake Laberge
- Incumbent
- Assumed office November 4, 2002
- Preceded by: Pam Buckway

Minister of Justice
- In office January 16, 2015 – December 3, 2016
- Premier: Darrell Pasloski
- Preceded by: Doug Graham
- Succeeded by: Tracy McPhee

Minister of Community Services
- In office August 5, 2013 – January 16, 2015
- Premier: Darrell Pasloski
- Preceded by: Elaine Taylor
- Succeeded by: Currie Dixon

Minister of Energy, Mines and Resources
- In office November 5, 2011 – August 5, 2013
- Premier: Darrell Pasloski
- Preceded by: Patrick Rouble
- Succeeded by: Scott Kent
- In office July 3, 2008 – August 28, 2009
- Premier: Dennis Fentie
- Preceded by: Archie Lang
- Succeeded by: Patrick Rouble

Minister of Health and Social Services
- In office December 12, 2005 – July 3, 2008
- Premier: Dennis Fentie
- Preceded by: Peter Jenkins
- Succeeded by: Glenn Hart

Personal details
- Party: Yukon Party (2002-2009; 2011-present)
- Other political affiliations: Independent (2009-2011)
- Occupation: Politician

Brad Cathers is a Canadian politician. He represents the electoral district of Lake Laberge in the Yukon Legislative Assembly on behalf of the Yukon Party. He is currently the longest-serving incumbent in the Assembly.

== Political career ==
Cathers was first elected to the Yukon Legislative Assembly in the general election of November 4, 2002, and re-elected in the general election of October 10, 2006. He served as Minister of Health and Social Services and Minister responsible for Yukon Workers' Compensation Health and Safety Board from December 12, 2005, to July 3, 2008; as Minister responsible for Yukon Liquor Corporation and Yukon Lottery Commission from July 3, 2008, to July 6, 2009; and as Minister of Energy, Mines and Resources from July 3, 2008, to August 28, 2009. He also served as Government House Leader from December 12, 2005, to August 28, 2009.

On August 28, 2009, Cathers resigned from cabinet and the government caucus to sit as an independent member over issues with then-Premier Dennis Fentie.

On June 29, 2011, Cathers rejoined the government caucus.

On October 11, 2011, Cathers was re-elected for a third term as MLA for Lake Laberge.

Cathers was sworn into Cabinet again on November 5, 2011, as Minister of Energy, Mines and Resources, Minister for Yukon Development Corporation and Yukon Energy Corporation, and Government House Leader. On August 5, 2013, he became Minister of Community Services, and Minister responsible for Yukon Housing Corporation, Yukon Liquor Corporation and the Yukon Lottery Commission.

In a Cabinet shuffle on January 16, 2015, Cathers was made Minister of Justice, Deputy Government House Leader and, for the second time, Minister for Yukon Development Corporation and Yukon Energy.

On May 10, 2016, he was reappointed Government House Leader, retaining his other ministerial responsibilities.

=== 34th Legislative Assembly ===
Cathers was re-elected in his riding of Lake Laberge in the 2016 Yukon election, despite the Yukon Party being swept from office by the Yukon Liberal Party. Following the defeat of former Yukon Party Deputy Premier Elaine Taylor, Cathers became the longest-serving incumbent MLA in the Yukon Legislative Assembly.

Cathers is currently a member of the Members' Services Board and the Standing Committee on Rules, Elections and Privileges. He is the Yukon Party Official Opposition Critic for Health and Social Services, Finance, Justice, Agriculture, and Democratic Institutions.

=== Leadership bid ===
On December 5, 2019, Cathers announced that he would run in the Yukon Party leadership election, which was held on May 23, 2020. He lost the election to Currie Dixon, placing second on the second ballot.

=== 35th Legislative Assembly ===
Cathers was re-elected in the 2021 territorial election.

In the 35th Legislature of Yukon, Cathers served as the Deputy House Leader of the Official Opposition and continued to serve as critic for Health and Social Services, Finance, Justice, Agriculture, and Democratic Institutions.

== Personal life ==
Until early 2007, Cathers was part owner of a wilderness tour company, Cathers Wilderness Adventures. He served as the Wilderness Tourism representative on the Yukon Tourism Education Council from 2000 until his election to the Legislative Assembly in 2002.

Cathers was a member of both the federal Reform Party of Canada and its successor, the Canadian Alliance.

== Electoral record ==
=== Yukon general election, 2025 ===
2025 Yukon general election: Lake Laberge
Party	Candidate	Votes	%	±%
Yukon Party	Brad Cathers	948	71.93	+9.36
New Democratic	Kai Miller	306	23.22	+2.94
Liberal	Tom Amson	64	4.86	-12.29
Total valid votes		1,318		
Total rejected ballots				
Turnout			62.85	
Eligible voters		2,097		
Yukon Party hold		Swing		+3.21
Source(s) "2025 General Election Official Results". Elections Yukon.

=== Yukon general election, 2021 ===
2021 Yukon general election: Lake Laberge
Party	Candidate	Votes	%	±%
Yukon Party	Brad Cathers	799	62.56	+15.6%
New Democratic	Ian A Angus	259	20.28	-1.7%
Liberal	Tracey Jacobs	219	17.14	-10.7%
Total valid votes		1,277		
Total rejected ballots				
Turnout				
Eligible voters				
Yukon Party hold		Swing		-21.14
Source(s) "Unofficial Election Results 2021". Elections Yukon.

=== Yukon general election, 2016 ===
Lake Laberge
Party	Candidate	Votes	%	±%
Yukon Party	Brad Cathers	558	46.5%	-5.4%
Liberal	Alan Young	342	28.5%	+12.9%
NDP	Anne Tayler	261	21.8%	-10.7%
Green	Julie Anne Ames	38	3.2%	+3.2%
Total		1,199	100.0%	–

=== Yukon general election, 2011 ===
Lake Laberge
Party	Candidate	Votes	%	±%
Yukon Party	Brad Cathers	528	51.9%	-5.4%
NDP	Frank Turner	330	32.5%	+17.5%
Liberal	Mike Simon	159	15.6%	-12.1%
Total		1,017	100.0%	–

=== Yukon general election, 2006 ===
Lake Laberge
Party	Candidate	Votes	%	±%
Yukon Party	Brad Cathers	458	57.3%	+1.2%
Liberal	John Breen	221	27.6%	+1.5%
NDP	Nina Sutherland	120	15.0%	-3.0%
Total		799	100.0%	–

=== Yukon general election, 2002 ===
Lake Laberge
Party	Candidate	Votes	%	±%
Yukon Party	Brad Cathers	466	55.9%	+21.6%
Liberal	Pam Buckway	218	26.1%	-22.4%
NDP	Bill Commins	150	18.0%	+0.8%
Total		834	100.0%	–
