= Mayo-Tatchun =

Territorial electoral district in the Yukon, Canada

Yukon electoral district
- Boundaries of Mayo-Tatchun

Territorial electoral district
- Legislature: Yukon Legislative Assembly
MLA
Cory Bellmore
Yukon Party
- First contested: 1992
- Last contested: 2025

Demographics
- Electors (2021): 1,035
- Census subdivision(s): Carmacks, Keno City, Mayo, Pelly Crossing, Stewart Crossing, Yukon, Unorganized

Mayo-Tatchun is a territorial electoral district of Yukon that has been represented in the Yukon Legislative Assembly since 1992.

The district is currently one of the Yukon's eight rural ridings. It is an amalgamation of the former Mayo and Tatchun electoral districts.

== Geography ==
Mayo-Tatchun includes the communities of Carmacks, Pelly Crossing, Mayo, Stewart Crossing, and Keno City. The riding includes the traditional territory of the Selkirk First Nation, the First Nation of Na-Cho Nyäk Dun, and the Little Salmon/Carmacks First Nation. As of 2025, it is bordered by the ridings of Vuntut Gwitchin, Klondike, Kluane, Lake Laberge, and Watson Lake-Ross River-Faro.

== Members of the Legislative Assembly ==
Assembly	Years	Member	Party
Mayo-Tatchun; Riding created from Mayo and Tatchun
28th	1992–1996	Danny Joe	New Democratic
29th	1996–2000	Eric Fairclough	New Democratic
30th	2000–2002	Eric Fairclough	New Democratic
31st	2002–2006	Eric Fairclough	New Democratic
32nd	2006–2011	Eric Fairclough	Liberal
33rd	2011–2016	Jim Tredger	New Democratic
34th	2016–2021	Don Hutton	Liberal
34th	2021–2021	Don Hutton	Independent
35th	2021–2025	Jeremy Harper	Liberal
36th	2025–present	Cory Bellmore	Yukon Party

== Electoral results ==
=== 2025 ===
2025 Yukon general election
** Preliminary results — Not yet official **
Party	Candidate	Votes	%	±%
Yukon Party	Cory Bellmore	315	46.0	
Liberal	Jeremy Harper	288	42.0	
New Democratic	Colin Prentice	82	12.0	
Total valid votes		685		
Total rejected ballots				
Turnout				
Eligible voters				
Source(s) "Unofficial Election Results 2025". Elections Yukon.

=== 2021 ===
2021 Yukon general election
Party	Candidate	Votes	%	±%
Liberal	Jeremy Harper	238	37.65	-7.6%
New Democratic	Patty Wallingham	208	32.91	+1.0%
Yukon Party	Peter Grundmanis	186	29.43	+6.7%
Total valid votes		632		
Total rejected ballots				
Turnout				
Eligible voters				
Liberal hold		Swing		-4.11
Source(s) "Unofficial Election Results 2021". Elections Yukon.

=== 2016 ===
2016 Yukon general election
Party	Candidate	Votes	%	±%
Liberal	Don Hutton	331	45.3%	+18.6%
NDP	Jim Tredger	233	31.9%	-9.8%
Yukon Party	Cory Bellmore	166	22.7%	-8.9%
Total		730	100.0%	–

=== 2011 ===
2011 Yukon general election
Party	Candidate	Votes	%	±%
NDP	Jim Tredger	282	41.7%	+24.2%
Yukon Party	Elaine Wyatt	214	31.6%	+2.3%
Liberal	Eric Fairclough	181	26.7%	-26.5%
Total		677	100.0%	–

=== 2006 ===
2006 Yukon general election
Party	Candidate	Votes	%	±%
Liberal	Eric Fairclough	301	53.2%	+22.6%
Yukon Party	Jean VanBibber	166	29.3%	+14.4%
NDP	Karen Gage	99	17.5%	-21.9%
Total		566	100.0%	–

=== 2002 ===
2002 Yukon general election
Party	Candidate	Votes	%	±%
NDP	Eric Fairclough	339	49.3%	-12.4%
Liberal	Pat Van Bibber	210	30.6%	-7.7%
Yukon Party	Jerry C. Kruse	102	14.9%	+14.9%
Independent	Dibs Williams	36	5.2%	+5.2%
Total		687	100.0%	–

=== 2000 ===
2000 Yukon general election
Party	Candidate	Votes	%	±%
NDP	Eric Fairclough	446	61.7%	-9.9%
Liberal	Wilf Tuck	277	38.3%	+38.3%
Total		723	100.0%	–

=== 1996 ===
1996 Yukon general election
Party	Candidate	Votes	%	±%
NDP	Eric Fairclough	454	71.6%	+26.6%
Yukon Party	Michael McGinnis	180	28.4%	-11.6%
Total		634	100.0%	–

=== 1992 ===
1992 Yukon general election
Party	Candidate	Votes	%	±%
NDP	Danny Joe	297	45.0%	–
Liberal	Roddy Blackjack	99	15.0%	–
Yukon Party	Si Mason-Wood	264	40.0%	–
Total		660	100.0%	–

== See also ==
- List of Yukon territorial electoral districts
- Canadian provincial electoral districts
