= Riverside (electoral district) =

Former territorial electoral district in the Yukon, Canada

Yukon electoral district

Defunct territorial electoral district
- Legislature: Yukon Legislative Assembly
- First contested: 1992
- Last contested: 2000

Demographics
- Census subdivision: Whitehorse

Riverside was a territorial electoral district in Yukon. The district elected one member to the Yukon Legislative Assembly from 1992 to 2002. At the 2002 election, the district was dissolved into Whitehorse Centre and Riverdale North. It is the former seat of Yukon Commissioner Jack Cable.

== Members ==
Parliament	Years	Member	Party
28th	1992–1996	Jack Cable	Liberal
29th	1996–2000	Jack Cable	Liberal
30th	2000–2002	Scott Kent	Liberal

== Election results ==
=== 2000 ===
2000 Yukon general election
Party	Candidate	Votes	%	±%
Liberal	Scott Kent	359	54.3	
NDP	Jasbir Randhawa	202	30.6	
Yukon Party	Michael Weinert	100	15.1	
Total		661	100	

=== 1996 ===
1996 Yukon general election
Party	Candidate	Votes	%	±%
Liberal	Jack Cable	267	38.9	
NDP	Gary Umbrich	260	37.8	
Yukon Party	Ed Henderson	160	23.3	
Total		687	100	

=== 1992 ===
1992 Yukon general election
Party	Candidate	Votes	%	±%
Liberal	Jack Cable	291	37.9	
Yukon Party	Nancy Huston	265	34.5	
NDP	Joyce Hayden	212	27.6	
Total		768	100	

== See also ==
- List of Yukon territorial electoral districts
- Canadian provincial electoral districts
