= Norma Kassi =

Canadian politician

MLA for Old Crow
- In office 1985–1992
- Preceded by: Kathie Nukon
- Succeeded by: Johnny Abel

Personal details
- Born: April 10, 1954 (age 72) Aklavik, Northwest Territories
- Party: Yukon New Democratic Party
- Occupation: environmentalist

Norma Kassi (born April 10, 1954) is a native Gwich'in from Yukon Territory, Canada, and a former member of the Yukon Legislative Assembly and former chief of the Vuntut Gwitchin First Nation. She was awarded the Goldman Environmental Prize in 2002, together with Sarah James and Jonathon Solomon. They received the prize for their struggles for protection of the Arctic National Wildlife Refuge (ANWR) from plans of oil exploration and drilling. Oil and gas exploration would disturb the life cycle of the Porcupine caribou, which has been the foundation for the Gwich'in culture for 20,000 years. In 2010 she was elected as Chief of the Vuntut Gwitchin.
