= Pauline Frost =

Canadian politician

Minister of Health and Social Services Minister of the Environment
- In office December 3, 2016 – April 19, 2021
- Premier: Sandy Silver
- Preceded by: Mike Nixon; Wade Istchenko

Member of the Yukon Legislative Assembly for Vuntut Gwitchin
- In office November 7, 2016 – March 12, 2021
- Preceded by: Darius Elias
- Succeeded by: Annie Blake

Personal details
- Party: Yukon Liberal Party

Pauline Frost is a Canadian politician who was elected to the Legislative Assembly of Yukon in the 2016 election. She represented the electoral district of Vuntut Gwitchin as a member of the Yukon Liberal Party and served one term. She was elected chief of the Vuntut Gwitchin First Nation in 2022.

Prior to entering territorial politics, Frost worked for the Vuntut Gwitchin Government as their negotiator, Intergovernmental Coordinator, and senior official for the past six years. She was the President of the Vuntut Gwitchin Limited Partnership, Chair of the Yukon Salmon Sub-Committee, and sat on the Air North Board and the Yukon First Nations Culture and Tourism Association. Previously, she worked as the Director of the Yukon First Nations Self-Government Secretariat.

On November 7, 2016, Frost defeated Yukon Party incumbent Darius Elias in the Yukon riding of Vuntut Gwitchin. Elias, a former Liberal MLA, had crossed the floor after the last election to join the Yukon Party. Frost's narrow margin of victory (7 votes) led to a judicial recount, which ultimately confirmed her victory.

Frost was sworn into Cabinet on December 3, 2016, as the Minister of Health and Social Services, Minister of the Environment, and Minister responsible for the Yukon Housing Corporation. She is the first Cabinet minister from Old Crow in more than three decades.

In the 2021 election, Frost tied with NDP candidate Annie Blake. After a judicial recount confirmed each candidate received 78 votes, Blake's name was drawn at random, thus denying Frost another term.

She was born and raised in Old Crow.

== Electoral record ==
2021 Yukon general election
Party	Candidate	Votes	%	±%
New Democratic	Annie Blake	78	50.0	+48.0%
Liberal	Pauline Frost	78	50.0	-1.3%
Total valid votes				
Total rejected ballots				
Turnout		156	76.5	
Eligible voters		204		
New Democratic gain from Liberal		Swing		+1
Source(s) "Unofficial Election Results 2021". Elections Yukon.

=== Yukon general election, 2016 ===
Vuntut Gwitchin
Party	Candidate	Votes	%	±%
Liberal	Pauline Frost	77	51.3%	-12.8%
Yukon Party	Darius Elias	70	46.7%	+10.8%
NDP	Skeeter Miller-Wright	3	2.0%	+2.0%
Total		150	100.0%	–
