= Ross River-Southern Lakes =

Former territorial electoral district in the Yukon, Canada

Yukon electoral district

Defunct territorial electoral district
- Legislature: Yukon Legislative Assembly
- First contested: 1992
- Last contested: 2000

Ross River-Southern Lakes was a territorial electoral district in Yukon. The district elected one member to the Yukon Legislative Assembly from 1992 to 2002. At the 2002 election, the district was divided between Pelly-Nisutlin and Southern Lakes. The current electoral districts of the Yukon may be found online at "Elections Yukon."

== Members ==
Parliament	Years	Member	Party
28th	1992–1996	Willard Phelps	Independent
29th	1996–2000	Dave Keenan	NDP
30th	2000–2002	Dave Keenan	NDP

== Election results ==
=== 1992 ===
1992 Yukon general election
Party	Candidate	Votes	%	±%
Independent	Willard Phelps	338	47.7	
Yukon New Democratic Party	Sam Johnston	234	33.0	
Independent	Timothy Cant	92	13.0	
Yukon Liberal Party	Jim Smarch	45	6.3	
Total		709	100	

=== 1996 ===
1996 Yukon general election
Party	Candidate	Votes	%	±%
NDP	Dave Keenan	484	56.9	
Independent	Willard Phelps	317	37.3	
Liberal	Bill Munroe	49	5.8	
Total		850	100	

=== 2000 ===
2000 Yukon general election
Party	Candidate	Votes	%	±%
NDP	Dave Keenan	357	51.4	
Liberal	Dorothy John	187	26.9	
Yukon Party	Ed Hall	150	21.6	
Total		694	99.9	

== See also ==
- List of Yukon territorial electoral districts
- Canadian provincial electoral districts
