= Lake Laberge (electoral district) =

Territorial electoral district in the Yukon, Canada

Yukon electoral district
- Interactive map of riding boundaries

Territorial electoral district
- Legislature: Yukon Legislative Assembly
MLA
Brad Cathers
Yukon Party
- First contested: 1992
- Last contested: 2025

Demographics
- Electors (2021): 1,719
- Census subdivision(s): Ibex Valley, Lake Laberge 1, Macpherson-Grizzly Valley, Whitehorse, Whitehorse, Unorganized, Yukon, Unorganized

Lake Laberge is a territorial electoral district of Yukon that has been represented in the Yukon Legislative Assembly since 1992.

The district is one of the Yukon's eight rural districts and is named after the eponymous Lake Laberge, which is within its boundaries. The riding is usually considered as a Yukon Party stronghold.

== Geography ==
Lake Laberge encompasses the Whitehorse subdivisions of MacPherson, and Hidden Valley, as well as the residents of the Takhini Hot Springs Road, Pilot Mountain, the Hamlet of Ibex Valley, and the North Klondike Highway and Lake Laberge as far as Braeburn Lodge. The riding is also part of the traditional territory of the Little Salmon/Carmacks First Nation, the Champagne and Aishihik First Nations, the Kwanlin Dün First Nation, and the Ta'an Kwach'an Council.

As of the 2025 general election, it is bordered by the rural ridings of Mayo-Tatchun, Kluane, Southern Lakes, Marsh Lake-Mount Lorne-Golden Horn, and Watson Lake-Ross River-Faro, as well as the Whitehorse ridings Porter Creek North and Riverdale North.

== Members of the Legislative Assembly ==
Assembly	Years	Member	Party
Lake Laberge; Riding created from Hootalinqua
28th	1992–1996	Mickey Fisher	Yukon Party
29th	1996–1999	Doug Livingston	New Democratic
29th	1999–2000	Pam Buckway	Liberal
30th	2000–2002	Pam Buckway	Liberal
31st	2002–2006	Brad Cathers	Yukon Party
32nd	2006–2009	Brad Cathers	Yukon Party
32nd	2009–2011	Brad Cathers	Independent
33rd	2011–2016	Brad Cathers	Yukon Party
34th	2016–2021	Brad Cathers	Yukon Party
35th	2021–2025	Brad Cathers	Yukon Party
36th	2025–Present	Brad Cathers	Yukon Party

== Electoral results ==
=== 2025 ===
2025 Yukon general election
** Preliminary results — Not yet official **
Party	Candidate	Votes	%	±%
Yukon Party	Brad Cathers	948	71.9	
New Democratic	Kai Miller	306	23.2	
Liberal	Tom Amson	64	4.9	
Total valid votes		1,398		
Total rejected ballots				
Turnout				
Eligible voters				
Yukon Party hold		Swing		
Source(s) "Unofficial Election Results 2025". Elections Yukon.

=== 2021 ===
2021 Yukon general election: Lake Laberge
Party	Candidate	Votes	%	±%
Yukon Party	Brad Cathers	799	62.56	+15.6%
New Democratic	Ian A Angus	259	20.28	-1.7%
Liberal	Tracey Jacobs	219	17.14	-10.7%
Total valid votes		1,277		
Total rejected ballots				
Turnout				
Eligible voters				
Yukon Party hold		Swing		-21.14
Source(s) "Unofficial Election Results 2021". Elections Yukon.

=== 2016 ===
2016 Yukon general election
Party	Candidate	Votes	%	±%
Yukon Party	Brad Cathers	558	46.5%	-5.4%
Liberal	Alan Young	342	28.5%	+12.9%
NDP	Anne Tayler	261	21.8%	-10.7%
Green	Julie Anne Ames	38	3.2%	+3.2%
Total		1199	100.0%	–

=== 2011 ===
2011 Yukon general election
Party	Candidate	Votes	%	±%
Yukon Party	Brad Cathers	528	51.9%	-5.4%
NDP	Frank Turner	330	32.5%	+17.5%
Liberal	Mike Simon	159	15.6%	-12.1%
Total		1017	100.0%	–

=== 2006 ===
2006 Yukon general election
Party	Candidate	Votes	%	±%
Yukon Party	Brad Cathers	458	57.3%	+1.2%
Liberal	John Breen	221	27.6%	+1.5%
NDP	Nina Sutherland	120	15.0%	-3.0%
Total		799	100.0%	–

=== 2002 ===
2002 Yukon general election
Party	Candidate	Votes	%	±%
Yukon Party	Brad Cathers	466	55.9%	+21.6%
Liberal	Pam Buckway	218	26.1%	-22.4%
NDP	Bill Commins	150	18.0%	+0.8%
Total		834	100.0%	–

=== 2000 ===
2000 Yukon general election
Party	Candidate	Votes	%	±%
Liberal	Pam Buckway	514	48.5%	+2.6%
Yukon Party	Roger Gallagher	363	34.3%	-1.8%
NDP	Gary LeGoffe	182	17.2%	-0.8%
Total		1059	100.0%	–

=== 1999 by-election ===
}

October, 1999 by-election On the resignation of Doug Livingston
Party	Candidate	Votes	%	±%
Liberal	Pam Buckway	459	45.9%	+24.2%
Yukon Party	Mickey Fisher	361	36.1%	+7.0%
NDP	Graham McDonald	180	18.0%	-11.4%
Total		1000	100.0%	–

=== 1996 ===
1996 Yukon general election
Party	Candidate	Votes	%	±%
NDP	Doug Livingston	328	29.4%	+9.6%
Yukon Party	Mickey Fisher	325	29.1%	-6.%5
Liberal	Linda Biensch	242	21.7%	+0.1%
Independent	Mark Bain	221	19.8%	+19.8%
Total		1116	100.0%	–

=== 1992 ===
1992 Yukon general election
Party	Candidate	Votes	%	±%
Yukon Party	Mickey Fisher	345	35.6%	–
Independent	Chris Gladish	223	23.0%	–
Liberal	Bonnie Hurlock	210	21.6%	–
NDP	Sandra Gibbs	192	19.8%	–
Total		970	100.0%	–

== See also ==
- List of Yukon territorial electoral districts
- Canadian provincial electoral districts
