= Andy Philipsen =

Canadian politician (1939–1985)

MLA for Whitehorse Porter Creek West
- In office 1982 – September 13, 1985
- Preceded by: Doug Graham
- Succeeded by: Alan Nordling

Personal details
- Born: 1939 Oxfordshire, England
- Died: September 13, 1985 (aged 45–46)
- Party: Progressive Conservative

Andrew A. Philipsen (1939 – September 13, 1985) was a Canadian politician, who served in the Legislative Assembly of Yukon from 1982 to 1985. He represented the electoral district of Whitehorse Porter Creek West as a member of the Yukon Progressive Conservative Party.

Born in Oxfordshire, England in 1939, Philipsen moved to Canada with his family in 1940. In adulthood he trained as an electrician, and moved to Yukon in 1962, where he worked for various electrical contractors and transportation companies.

He was first elected to the legislature in the 1982 territorial election. He served in the Executive Council of Yukon as Minister of Health and Human Resources and Government Services, Minister of Justice and Minister of Community and Transportation Services.

He was reelected to the legislature in the 1985 election on May 13, 1985, but died in a vehicle accident on the Dempster Highway on September 13. He was succeeded in a by-election in February 1986 by Alan Nordling.
