= Vuntut Gwitchin (electoral district) =

Territorial electoral district in the Yukon, Canada

Yukon electoral district
- Interactive map of riding boundaries

Territorial electoral district
- Legislature: Yukon Legislative Assembly
MLA
Debra-Leigh Reti
Liberal
- First contested: 1978
- Last contested: 2025

Demographics
- Electors (2021): 204
- Communities: Old Crow

Vuntut Gwitchin (formerly Old Crow) is a territorial electoral district of Yukon that has been represented in the Yukon Legislative Assembly since 1978.

Being one of Yukon's eight rural ridings, it is the least populated electoral district in any provincial or territorial legislature in Canada, with fewer than 200 total ballots cast in any territorial election to date.

In two elections since the district's creation, two candidates finished in an exact tie; under Yukon election law, a tied vote is settled by drawing lots rather than by reconducting a full by-election.

== Geography ==
As of the 2025 Yukon general election, Vuntut Gwitchin comprises the community of Old Crow in northern Yukon and the surrounding traditional territory of the Vuntut Gwitchin First Nation. The district also includes Vuntut National Park, Ivvavik National Park, Herschel Island, and adjacent areas of the northern Yukon tundra.

== Members of the Legislative Assembly ==
Assembly	Years	Member	Party
Old Crow; Riding created from Ogilvie
24th	1978–1982	Grafton Njootli	Progressive Conservative
25th	1982–1985	Kathie Nukon	Progressive Conservative
26th	1985–1989	Norma Kassi	New Democratic
27th	1989–1992	Norma Kassi	New Democratic
Vuntut Gwitchin
28th	1992–1995†	Johnny Abel	Yukon Party
28th	1996–1996	Esau Schafer	Yukon Party
29th	1996–2000	Robert Bruce	New Democratic
30th	2000–2002	Lorraine Peter	New Democratic
31st	2002–2006	Lorraine Peter	New Democratic
32nd	2006–2011	Darius Elias	Liberal
33rd	2011–2012	Darius Elias	Liberal
33rd	2012–2013	Darius Elias	Independent
33rd	2013–2016	Darius Elias	Yukon Party
34th	2016–2021	Pauline Frost	Liberal
35th	2021–2025	Annie Blake	New Democratic
36th	2025–present	Debra-Leigh Reti	Liberal

== Election results ==
=== 2025 ===
2025 Yukon general election
** Preliminary results — Not yet official **
Party	Candidate	Votes	%	±%
Liberal	Debra-Leigh Reti	52	39.7	
New Democratic	Annie Blake	45	34.4	
Yukon Party	Sandra Charlie	34	26.0	
Total valid votes		131		
Total rejected ballots				
Turnout				
Eligible voters				
Source(s) "Unofficial Election Results 2025". Elections Yukon.

=== 2021 ===
As both candidates each received 78 votes, it resulted in a tie. A judicial recount took place and there remained a tie vote, therefore a random draw determined that Annie Blake would fill the seat.

2021 Yukon general election
Party	Candidate	Votes	%	±%
New Democratic	Annie Blake	78	50.0	+48.0%
Liberal	Pauline Frost	78	50.0	-1.3%
Total valid votes				
Total rejected ballots				
Turnout		156	76.5	
Eligible voters		204		
New Democratic gain from Liberal		Swing		+1
Source(s) "Unofficial Election Results 2021". Elections Yukon.

=== 2016 ===
2016 Yukon general election
Party	Candidate	Votes	%	±%
Liberal	Pauline Frost	77	51.3%	-12.8%
Yukon Party	Darius Elias	70	46.7%	+10.8%
NDP	Skeeter Miller-Wright	3	2.0%	+2.0%
Total		150	100.0%	–

=== 2011 ===
2011 Yukon general election
Party	Candidate	Votes	%	±%
Liberal	Darius Elias	93	64.1%	+18.1%
Yukon Party	Garry Njootli	52	35.9%	+9.9%
Total		145	100.0%	–

=== 2006 ===
2006 Yukon general election
Party	Candidate	Votes	%	±%
Liberal	Darius Elias	65	45.8%	+22.0%
NDP	Lorraine Peter	40	28.2%	-19.3%
Yukon Party	William Josie	37	26.0%	-2.7%
Total		142	100.0%	–

=== 2002 ===
2002 Yukon general election
Party	Candidate	Votes	%	±%
NDP	Lorraine Peter	68	47.5%	+9.8%
Yukon Party	Randall Tetlichi	41	28.7%	-0.3%
Liberal	Joe Tetlichi	34	23.8%	-9.5%
Total		143	100.0%	–

=== 2000 ===
2000 Yukon general election
Party	Candidate	Votes	%	±%
NDP	Lorraine Netro	69	37.7%	-17.3%
Liberal	Esau Schafer	61	33.3%	+33.3%
Yukon Party	Kathie Nukon	53	29.0%	-16.0%
Total		183	100.0%	–

=== 1997 by-election ===
April 1997 by-election
Party	Candidate	Votes	%	±%
NDP	Robert Bruce	88	55.0%	+13.2%
Yukon Party	Esau Schafer	72	45.0%	+3.2%
Total		160	100.0%	–

- Held after a challenge of the 1996 results.

=== 1996 ===
1996 Yukon general election
Party	Candidate	Votes	%	±%
NDP	Robert Bruce	69	41.8%	-2.4%
Yukon Party	Esau Schafer	69	41.8%	-14.0%
Liberal	Shirlee Frost	27	16.4%	+16.4%
Total		165	100.0%	–

- Because of the tie vote, Robert Bruce was declared elected after his name was drawn from a hat.

=== 1996 by-election ===
1996 by-election
Party	Candidate	Votes	%	±%
Yukon Party	Esau Schafer	87	55.8%	-7.4%
NDP	Randall Tetlichi	69	44.2%	+44.2%
Total		156	100.0%	–

- Held on the death of Johnny Abel, 1995.

=== 1992 ===
1992 Yukon general election
Party	Candidate	Votes	%	±%
Yukon Party	Johnny Abel	96	63.2%	–
Liberal	Grafton Njootli	56	36.8%	–
Total		152	100.0%	–

== See also ==
- List of Yukon territorial electoral districts
- Canadian provincial electoral districts
