= Pam Buckway =

Canadian politician

MLA for Lake Laberge
- In office 1999–2002
- Preceded by: Doug Livingston
- Succeeded by: Brad Cathers

Personal details
- Born: June 15, 1949 (age 77) Whitehorse, Yukon, Canada
- Party: Yukon Liberal Party
- Relatives: Bev Buckway (sister)
- Education: University of Alaska Fairbanks
- Occupation: Radio announcer

Pam Buckway (born June 15, 1949) is a former Canadian politician. She represented the electoral district of Lake Laberge in the Yukon Legislative Assembly as a member of the Yukon Liberal Party from 1999 to 2002.

== Early life and career ==
Buckway was born June 15, 1949 in Whitehorse, Yukon. She graduated from F.H. Collins High School in 1966. She attended the University of Alaska Fairbanks where she obtained an associate degree in electronics technology in 1970 and a Bachelor of Arts in 1973.

Before entering politics, Buckway worked at the CBC from 1974 to 1997 as a radio announcer and a union negotiator. She left the position to pursue a career in real estate and later worked as an office manager at a veterinary clinic.

== Political career ==
Buckway was elected to represent the riding of Lake Laberge in a by-election in 1999 as a member of the Yukon Liberal Party following the resignation of Doug Livingston from the Yukon Legislative Assembly. Her victory gave the Yukon Liberal Party enough seats to displace the Yukon Party as the Official Opposition. She was appointed critic for the Department of Government Services, the Public Service Commission, the Department of Renewable Resources, and the Yukon Housing Corporation.

Buckway retained the seat in the 2000 election, which saw the Yukon Liberal Party form government. She served as both the Minister of Justice and as the Minister of Community and Transportation Services in the government of Pat Duncan. However, she was defeated by Brad Cathers of the Yukon Party in the 2002 election.

== Personal life ==
Buckway's sister, Bev Buckway, served as mayor of Whitehorse from 2006 to 2012.
