= Robert Bruce (Yukon politician) =

Canadian politician (1948–2023)

MLA for Vuntut Gwitchin
- In office 1996–2000
- Preceded by: Esau Schafer
- Succeeded by: Lorraine Peter

Personal details
- Born: July 12, 1948
- Died: April 16, 2023 (aged 74)
- Party: New Democrat

Robert Bruce (July 12, 1948 – April 16, 2023) was a Canadian politician. He represented the electoral district of Vuntut Gwitchin in the Yukon Legislative Assembly from 1996 to 2000. He was a member of the Yukon New Democratic Party.

He was born in Old Crow, Yukon and was educated in the Yukon. After a tied vote between Bruce and incumbent MLA Esau Schafer in the 1996 election, Bruce was chosen as the victor by his name being drawn out of a hat. A court order in 1997 overturned the results and mandated a new by-election in the riding, which Bruce won. He served as Speaker for the assembly from 1996 until his election was overturned in February 1997 and from April 14, 1997 until the assembly was dissolved in 2000. He did not stand for re-election in the 2000 election.

He was previously a councillor for the Vuntut Gwitchin First Nation, serving as chief from 1992 to 1996. Bruce worked for a time as a heavy equipment operator.

Bruce died on April 16, 2023, at the age of 74.

== Sources ==
- O'Handley, Kathleen (1997). Canadian Parliamentary Guide, 1997. ISBN 1-896413-43-9.
