= Mickey Fisher (politician) =

Canadian politician

Member of the Legislative Assembly of Yukon
- In office 1992–1996
- Preceded by: first member
- Succeeded by: Doug Livingston
- Constituency: Lake Laberge

Personal details
- Born: December 22, 1940
- Died: December 22, 2021 (aged 81)
- Party: Yukon Party

Mickey Fisher (born December 22, 1940—December 22, 2021) is a Canadian politician, who served in the Legislative Assembly of Yukon from 1992 to 1996. He represented the electoral district of Lake Laberge as a member of the Yukon Party.

First elected in the 1992 election, he served in the cabinet of John Ostashek as Minister of Renewable Resources. He was defeated in the 1996 election by Doug Livingston of the Yukon New Democratic Party, by a margin of just three votes.
