= Johnny Abel =

Canadian politician

- Abel c. 1992

MLA for Vuntut Gwitchin
- In office 1992–1995
- Preceded by: Norma Kassi
- Succeeded by: Esau Schafer

Personal details
- Born: January 1, 1947 Old Crow, Yukon
- Died: October 13, 1995 (aged 48) Yukon, Canada
- Party: Yukon Party
- Occupation: band councillor

Johnny W. Abel (January 1, 1947 – October 13, 1995) was a Canadian politician, who represented the electoral district of Vuntut Gwitchin in the Yukon Legislative Assembly from 1992 until his death in 1995. He was a member of the Yukon Party.

He served as chief of the Vuntut Gwitchin First Nation from 1978 to 1984.

Abel drowned in a canoeing accident in 1995.

The film Arctic Son was inspired by a meeting between Andrew Walton and Johnny Abel.
