= Alan Nordling =

Canadian politician

MLA for Whitehorse Porter Creek West
- In office 1986–1992
- Preceded by: Andy Philipsen
- Succeeded by: riding dissolved

MLA for Porter Creek South
- In office 1992–1996
- Preceded by: first member
- Succeeded by: Pat Duncan

Personal details
- Born: May 25, 1952 (age 73) Dawson City, Yukon
- Party: Progressive Conservative → Independent Alliance
- Occupation: nurse

Alan Ronald Nordling (born May 25, 1952) is a former Canadian politician who represented the electoral district of Whitehorse Porter Creek West from 1986 to 1992 and Porter Creek South from 1992 to 1996, in the Yukon Legislative Assembly. He was a member of the Yukon Progressive Conservative Party.

Nordling was first elected to the legislature in a by-election on February 10, 1986. He sat as a member of the Yukon Progressive Conservative Party until 1991, when he was one of two MLAs, along with Bea Firth, who quit the caucus in protest against the party's change of name to the Yukon Party. Firth and Nordling thereafter sat as the only members of the Independent Alliance. Nordling later rejoined the Yukon Party and ran in the 1996 election as a Yukon Party candidate, but was defeated by Yukon Liberal Party candidate Pat Duncan.
