= Esau Schafer =

Canadian politician (born 1952)

MLA for Vuntut Gwitchin
- In office 1996–1996
- Preceded by: Johnny Abel
- Succeeded by: Robert Bruce

Personal details
- Born: January 16, 1952 (age 74) Johnston Creek Township, Yukon
- Party: Yukon Party
- Occupation: band councillor

Esau Albert Schafer (born January 16, 1952) is a Canadian politician, who represented the electoral district of Vuntut Gwitchin in the Yukon Legislative Assembly in 1996. He was a member of the Yukon Party.

Schafer was elected to represent the district in a by-election in early 1996, following the death of Johnny Abel in 1995. In the general election later that year, however, Schafer and his New Democrat opponent Robert Bruce ended up tied with exactly 69 votes each, and Bruce was ultimately declared the winner by means of his name being drawn from a hat. Schafer challenged the results in court, and was successful in having the election overturned, but Bruce won the resulting by-election with a clear margin.

Schafer is currently on the council of the Vuntut Gwitchin First Nation, having served on that body since 2003.
