= Doug Livingston =

Canadian politician

Douglas Roy Livingston (born April 15, 1954) is an educator and former political figure in the Yukon, Canada. He represented Lake Laberge in the Yukon Legislative Assembly from 1996 to 1999 as a NDP member.

He was born in Loon Lake, Saskatchewan, the son of Roy Livingston and Elsie Anderson, and was educated at the University of Saskatchewan and the University of Oregon. Livingston was a teacher and principal. He defeated the incumbent Mickey Fisher in 1996 by only three votes. Livingston served as Speaker for the assembly briefly in 1997. He was named speaker after the election of Robert Bruce was overturned in February 1997; Bruce became speaker again after he won a by-election in April 1997. Livingston resigned his seat in the assembly in 1999.
