= Jack Cable (politician) =

Canadian politician (1934–2021)

MLA for Riverside
- In office October 19, 1992 – April 17, 2000
- Preceded by: first member
- Succeeded by: Scott Kent

Commissioner of the Yukon
- In office October 1, 2000 – December 1, 2005
- Prime Minister: Jean Chrétien; Paul Martin
- Premier: Pat Duncan; Dennis Fentie
- Preceded by: Judy Gingell
- Succeeded by: Geraldine Van Bibber

Personal details
- Born: August 17, 1934 Hamilton, Ontario, Canada
- Died: July 21, 2021 (aged 86) Whitehorse, Yukon, Canada
- Party: Liberal
- Occupation: lawyer

Ivan John Cable QC OY (August 17, 1934 – July 21, 2021) was a Canadian politician. He served as a member of the Yukon Legislative Assembly from 1992 to 2000, representing the electoral district of Riverside as a member and interim leader of the Yukon Liberal Party. He was first elected in the 1992 election and again in the 1996 election.

He was subsequently appointed the commissioner of Yukon, serving from October 1, 2000 to December 1, 2005.

Born in Hamilton, Ontario, he practiced law in Whitehorse for 21 years. As a public servant, he had been director of the Northern Canada Power Commission, president of its successor Yukon Energy Corporation, a founding member of Recycle Organics Together Society, director of Yukon Science Institute, a member of the Advisory Committee of the Salvation Army Adult Residential Centre and president of the Yukon Chamber of Commerce.

He was also a member of the Learning Disabilities Association of the Yukon, the Association of Professional Engineers of the Yukon and founding member of Boreal Alternate Energy Centre.

He held a degree in chemical engineering from University of Toronto, an MBA from McMaster University and a Bachelor of Law from the University of Western Ontario.

Cable was appointed to the Order of Yukon in 2020. Cable died in July 2021 at the age of 86.
