= David Sloan (politician) =

Canadian politician

MLA for Whitehorse West
- In office 1996–2000
- Preceded by: Tony Penikett
- Succeeded by: Dennis Schneider

Personal details
- Born: David Richard Sloan; July 3, 1949 (age 76) Belfast, Northern Ireland
- Party: New Democrat

David Richard Sloan is a Canadian politician, who represented the electoral district of Whitehorse West in the Yukon Legislative Assembly from 1996 to 2000. He was a member of the Yukon New Democratic Party caucus.

He subsequently joined the Yukon Liberal Party and contested the new electoral district of Mountainview in the 2011 election, but was not re-elected to the legislature.
