= Old Crow, Yukon =

Old Crow
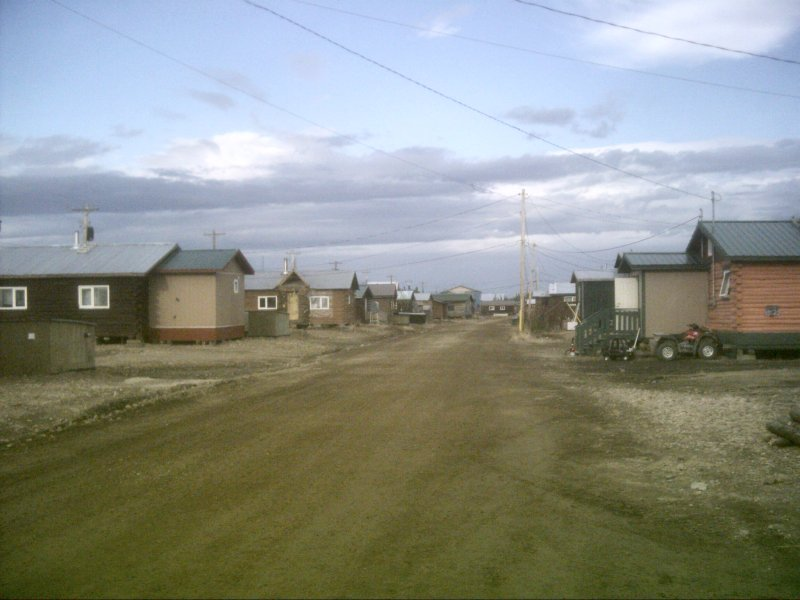
- Interactive map of Old Crow
- Location within Yukon Location within Canada
- Coordinates: 67°34′07″N 139°50′07″W
- Country: Canada
- Territory: Yukon

Area (2021)
  - Land: 13.51 km^{2} (5.22 sq mi)

Population (2021)
  - Total: 236
  - Density: 17.5/km^{2} (45/sq mi)
  - Change 2016–2021: ▲+6.8%
- Time zone: UTC−07:00 (MST)
- Postal code: Y0B 1N0
- Area code: 867
- Telephone exchange: 966
- Website: http://www.oldcrow.ca/index.htm

Old Crow is a community in the Canadian territory of Yukon.

Located in a periglacial environment, the community is situated on the Porcupine River in the far northern part of the territory. Old Crow is the only Yukon community that cannot be reached by motor vehicle, requiring visitors to fly in to Old Crow Airport. It is a dry community. Old Crow is also the northernmost non-Inuit indigenous community in North America, and one of only a few such communities north of the Arctic Circle outside of Eurasia.

== History ==
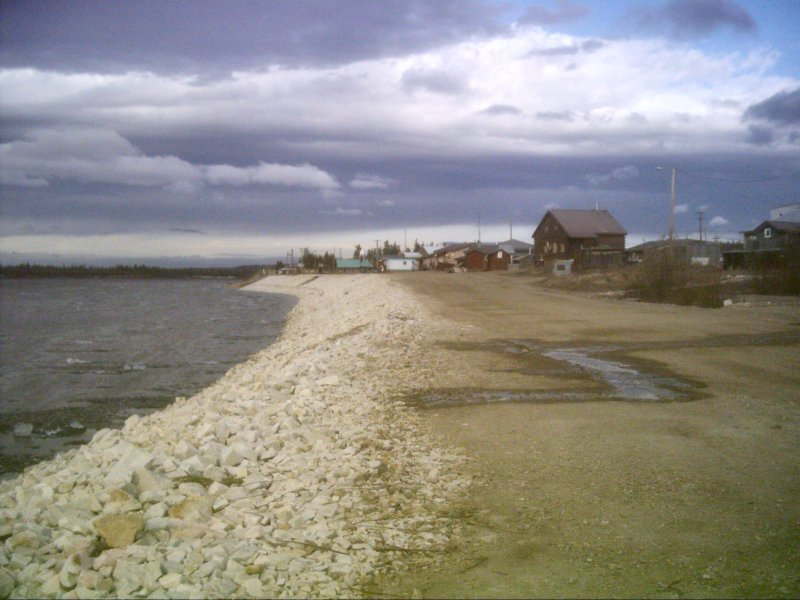
View from the river bank

A large number of apparently human-modified animal bones have been discovered in the Old Crow area, notably at Bluefish Caves, about 380 km (240 mi) south, and the Old Crow Flats, located about 14 km (8.7 mi) south, that have been dated to 25,000–40,000 years ago by carbon dating, several thousand years earlier than generally accepted human habitation of North America.

An Indigenous chief named Deetru` K`avihdik, literally "Crow-May-I-Walk", helped settle a community here around the 1870s and the town was named after him. The village was founded around muskrat trapping, which continues to provide basic income.

The people of Old Crow are dependent on the Porcupine caribou herd for food and clothing. The Porcupine caribou herd migrates to the coastal plain in the Arctic National Wildlife Refuge (ANWR) in Alaska to give birth to their young. Many citizens of Old Crow believe the herd is being seriously threatened by oil-drilling in the ANWR and have been heavily involved in lobbying to prevent it.

Fiddling and dances are important to the local culture. The first fiddle was brought to the community over 100 years ago after being introduced by the Hudson's Bay Company. Fiddler Benjamin Boyd noted that many fiddlers would learn tunes at the dances, and due to the isolation of the community, the fiddle style in Old Crow is unique. In 2024, Old Crow was inducted into the Canadian Fiddle Hall of Honour at the Canadian Grand Masters held in Whitehorse.

== Demographics ==
Federal census population history of Old Crow
Year	Pop.	±%
1941	124	—
1951	153	+23.4%
1981	243	+58.8%
1986	232	−4.5%
1991	256	+10.3%
1996	278	+8.6%
2001	299	+7.6%
2006	253	−15.4%
2011	245	−3.2%
2016	221	−9.8%
2021	236	+6.8%
Source: Statistics Canada

In the 2021 Canadian census conducted by Statistics Canada, Old Crow had a population of 236 living in 116 of its 168 total private dwellings, a change of 6.8% from its 2016 population of 221. With a land area of 13.51 km^{2} (5.22 sq mi), it had a population density of 17.5/km^{2} (45.2/sq mi) in 2021.

Most of its population are Gwichʼin, a First Nations people who belong to the Vuntut Gwitchin First Nation.

== Infrastructure ==
=== Transportation ===
Old Crow Airport provides year-round transportation to other communities. During winter time, a temporary winter road is sometimes built from Eagle Plains to transport freight into Old Crow; it is not annual, but only when a significant need arises such as a major building project.

=== Energy supply ===
Electric energy is supplied by three diesel generators (170 kW (230 hp), 330 kW (440 hp), and 600 kW (800 hp)), operated by ATCO Electric Yukon. As the community has no road or port access, diesel fuel needs to be flown in.

In 2019, the microgrid was extended by a photovoltaic power station (PV) which generates electricity in the summer season, thus saving about 190,000 L (42,000 imp gal; 50,000 US gal) of diesel per year (~$400,000 /a). The plant has been built in a back-to-back configuration to receive a mostly continuous solar harvest during the day. Consequently, the direct current (DC) capacity of the PV panels (in sum 940 kW (1,260 hp)_{peak}) is partly orientated westwards and partly eastwards; the alternating current (AC) capacity of the PV inverter is 480 kW (640 hp). A battery energy storage system (BESS) has been added with an energy capacity of 350 kWh (1,300 MJ), balancing out smaller cloud fluctuations and avoiding rapid start stop cycles of the diesel gensets. The whole PV-BESS plant is $6.5 million and shall last for at least 25 years.

By May 2021, the solar plant had begun producing electricity, projected to be fully operational by July and capable of letting the community turn off their diesel generators on sunny days.

=== Communications ===
Old Crow is served by Northwestel since 1971. The long-distance connection originally relied on a microwave relay at Rat Pass near the Yukon / NWT border, which also provided a radiotelephone base station along the Dempster Highway, but it was frequently out of service in winter when weather conditions made helicopter access hazardous. In the late 1980s, a satellite ground station was installed in Old Crow, providing more reliable service.

The long-distance connection is noteworthy for two minor incidents. In 1985, the Yukon territorial election was covered by live television coverage for the first time, sent by satellite to Toronto for switching into the network stations in Yukon; however, results from Old Crow were unavailable due to the microwave failure. On 11 September 2001, the satellite connection went out of service, and an aircraft bringing a technician to repair it was challenged by Canadian Armed Forces aircraft for violating the closure of airspace throughout North America.

The community operated its own television transmitter to carry CBC Television signals from satellite. The current status of this transmitter is unknown since the CBC in 2012 closed down analog transmitters it owned. The community has Aboriginal Peoples Television Network (APTN), as well as CHON-FM and CKRW-FM transmitters and a community-owned transmitter picking up CBC Radio station CHAK-AM in Inuvik.

== Geography ==
=== Climate ===
Old Crow has a subarctic climate (Köppen climate classification Dfc) with mild summers and severely cold winters. Average annual temperature is −7.7 °C (18.1 °F). Old Crow experiences annual temperature average daily highs of 20.4 °C (68.7 °F) in July and average daily lows of −28.7 °C (−19.7 °F) in January. Record high temperature was 32.8 °C (91.0 °F) on August 30, 1976, and the lowest was −59.4 °C (−74.9 °F) on January 5, 1975. Precipitation is very low, but is somewhat higher in the summer. Average annual snowfall is 154.9 cm (60.98 in) and rainfall is 160.1 mm (6.30 in).

As Old Crow is located north of the Arctic Circle, it experiences polar day or midnight sun in summer and polar night in winter. The midnight sun is typically between May 5 and August 8 inclusive, while the polar night usually starts around December 14 and ends by December 29.

Climate data for Old Crow (Old Crow Airport) Climate ID: 2100800; coordinates 67°34′14″N 159°30′21″W; elevation: 250.2 m (821 ft); 1991–2020 normals, extremes 1951–present (Note: Composite data from Old Crow RCS: WMO ID: 71044; coordinates 67°34′14″N 159°30′21″W; elevation: 251.2 m (824 ft))
Month	Jan	Feb	Mar	Apr	May	Jun	Jul	Aug	Sep	Oct	Nov	Dec	Year
Record high humidex	0.5	2.8	6.5	15.0	28.1	32.2	35.5	38.4	22.5	15.2	0.5	1.3	38.4
Record high °C (°F)	2.5 (36.5)	3.0 (37.4)	7.0 (44.6)	15.9 (60.6)	28.1 (82.6)	32.3 (90.1)	32.4 (90.3)	32.8 (91.0)	23.9 (75.0)	17.5 (63.5)	6.1 (43.0)	1.7 (35.1)	32.8 (91.0)
Mean daily maximum °C (°F)	−24.6 (−12.3)	−20.8 (−5.4)	−14.7 (5.5)	−2.8 (27.0)	10.2 (50.4)	19.3 (66.7)	20.4 (68.7)	16.1 (61.0)	8.1 (46.6)	−4.4 (24.1)	−17.6 (0.3)	−21.4 (−6.5)	−2.7 (27.1)
Daily mean °C (°F)	−28.7 (−19.7)	−25.6 (−14.1)	−21.2 (−6.2)	−9.1 (15.6)	4.3 (39.7)	13.2 (55.8)	14.8 (58.6)	10.9 (51.6)	3.8 (38.8)	−7.8 (18.0)	−21.6 (−6.9)	−25.5 (−13.9)	−7.7 (18.1)
Mean daily minimum °C (°F)	−32.9 (−27.2)	−30.4 (−22.7)	−27.6 (−17.7)	−15.3 (4.5)	−1.6 (29.1)	7.0 (44.6)	9.2 (48.6)	5.7 (42.3)	−0.4 (31.3)	−11.2 (11.8)	−25.5 (−13.9)	−29.6 (−21.3)	−12.7 (9.1)
Record low °C (°F)	−59.4 (−74.9)	−54.4 (−65.9)	−48.3 (−54.9)	−39.5 (−39.1)	−28.0 (−18.4)	−8.3 (17.1)	−2.5 (27.5)	−9.5 (14.9)	−22.5 (−8.5)	−38.0 (−36.4)	−47.0 (−52.6)	−56.7 (−70.1)	−59.4 (−74.9)
Record low wind chill	−59.6	−55.8	−51.9	−44.5	−32.0	−10.4	0.0	−11.9	−20.3	−42.0	−53.2	−57.3	−59.6
Average precipitation mm (inches)	13.5 (0.53)	20.3 (0.80)	15.6 (0.61)	11.7 (0.46)	21.8 (0.86)	36.5 (1.44)	42.4 (1.67)	48.2 (1.90)	27.8 (1.09)	20.6 (0.81)	18.3 (0.72)	18.4 (0.72)	294.8 (11.61)
Average rainfall mm (inches)	0.0 (0.0)	0.1 (0.00)	0.0 (0.0)	0.7 (0.03)	9.1 (0.36)	34.7 (1.37)	48.1 (1.89)	44.4 (1.75)	21.5 (0.85)	1.6 (0.06)	0.0 (0.0)	0.0 (0.0)	160.1 (6.30)
Average snowfall cm (inches)	16.3 (6.4)	16.9 (6.7)	16.2 (6.4)	9.0 (3.5)	6.4 (2.5)	3.6 (1.4)	0.0 (0.0)	1.0 (0.4)	8.7 (3.4)	27.5 (10.8)	26.6 (10.5)	22.7 (8.9)	154.9 (61.0)
Average precipitation days (≥ 0.2 mm)	11.0	10.8	11.6	7.9	10.5	11.3	14.1	15.3	12.8	14.2	12.3	12.2	144.0
Average rainy days (≥ 0.2 mm)	0.00	0.06	0.0	0.68	4.2	10.1	14.4	14.3	9.5	1.2	0.0	0.0	54.5
Average snowy days (≥ 0.2 cm)	10.8	10.4	10.1	5.7	3.00	1.0	0.0	0.4	4.1	14.1	14.2	12.8	86.4
Average relative humidity (%) (at 1500 LST)	72.6	72.6	61.1	56.7	49.3	46.0	53.8	61.2	66.2	79.5	80.1	75.8	64.6
Source: Environment and Climate Change Canada (June maximum) (July maximum)

== Notable residents ==
- Edith Josie, journalist
- Bertha Allen, feminist activist
