= Vuntut Gwitchin First Nation =

First Nation in Yukon, Canada

The Vuntut Gwitchin First Nation (VGFN) is a First Nation in the northern Yukon in Canada. Its main population centre is Old Crow. The language originally spoken by the people is Gwichʼin.

== Gwich'in Nation ==
Vuntut Gwich'in refers specifically to the Gwich'in people who lived in Van Tat which translates as "people of the lakes." More recently, VGFN has incorporated the Vuntut Gwich'in and Dagoo Gwich'in (who traditionally lived further up the Porcupine River). The wider Gwich'in nation is spread across northwestern Canada and Alaska. Other Gwich'in communities include: the Tetlit Gwich'in in Fort McPherson, Northwest Territories; Tsiigehtchic Gwich'in in Tsiigehtchic, Northwest Territories; Gwichyaa Gwich'in in Fort Yukon, Alaska; Arctic Village, Alaska; Chalkyitsik, Alaska; and Venetie, Alaska.

== Self Government Agreement ==
The Vuntut Gwitchin First Nation was one of the first four First Nations to sign a land claims agreement in 1995.

The chief is presently Pauline Frost, and was previously Dana Tizya-Tramm from 2019 to 2023.

== Vuntut Development Corporation ==
Vuntut Development Corporation, the business arm of the Vuntut Gwitchin First Nation, owns 49% of Air North, a Canadian airline based in Whitehorse. Air North provides regular passenger and cargo service to Old Crow, several other Yukon destinations, Inuvik, as well as six major Canadian cities.

In partnership with Kluane First Nation, Vuntut Development Corporation and North Air created and run Chieftain Energy Limited Partnership. Additional non-equity partnership arrangements exist with Dease River First Nation, Kwanlin Dün First Nation, Selkirk First Nation, the First Nation of Na-Cho Nyäk Dun and Tr’ondëk Hwëch’in. This energy company is the first majority First Nation-owned company. Its goal is to maintain a local supply chain for fuel, lubricants, and liquified natural gas. It services the Yukon, Northwest Territories, and Northern B.C.

== Notable people ==
- Edith Josie, writer
- Jeneen Frei Njootli, artist
