= 23rd Yukon Territorial Council =

Legislature of Yukon, Canada, 1974–1978

The 23rd Yukon Territorial Council, the final term of the Yukon Territorial Council before it was replaced with the contemporary Legislative Assembly of Yukon, was in session from 1974 to 1978. Membership was set by the 1974 Yukon general election, with one follow-up by-election in 1975 after the election of Willard Phelps was overturned on conflict of interest grounds.

The election was noted for the expansion of the territorial council from seven to twelve members, the largest in its history. Nine of the twelve electoral districts were new ones which had not existed in the preceding election; although due to another redistribution when the Legislative Assembly was created, four of the new districts were represented only in the 23rd council and were not recontested in the 1978 election.

== Members ==
Councillors
District	Councillor	First elected / previously elected	No. of terms	Notes
Hootalinqua	Robert Fleming	1974	1st term	
Klondike	Fred Berger	1974	1st term	
Kluane	Hilda Watson	1970	2nd term	
Mayo	Gordon McIntyre	1974	1st term	
Ogilvie	Eleanor Millard	1974	1st term	Appointed to executive committee in 1978
Pelly River	Stuart McCall	1974	1st term	
Watson Lake	Don Taylor	1961	5th term	
Whitehorse North Centre	Ken McKinnon	1961, 1967	4th term*	
Whitehorse Porter Creek	Daniel Lang	1974	1st term	
Whitehorse Riverdale	Willard Phelps	1974	1st term	Election overturned in 1975
Whitehorse Riverdale	Walt Lengerke (1975)	1975	1st term	Won byelection in 1975
Whitehorse South Centre	Jack Hibberd	1974	1st term	
Whitehorse West	Flo Whyard	1974	1st term	
