= 1979 in Canada =

- Decades: 1950s; 1960s; 1970s; 1980s; 1990s
- See also: History of Canada; Timeline of Canadian history; List of years in Canada

Events from the year 1979 in Canada.

== Incumbents ==
=== Crown ===
- Monarch – Elizabeth II

=== Federal government ===
- Governor General – Jules Léger (until January 22) then Edward Schreyer
- Prime Minister – Pierre Trudeau (until June 4) then Joe Clark
- Chief Justice of Canada – Bora Laskin (Ontario)
- Parliament – 30th (until 26 March) then 31st (11 June–14 December)

=== Provincial governments ===
==== Lieutenant governors ====
- Lieutenant Governor of Alberta – Ralph Steinhauer (until October 18) then Francis Charles Lynch-Staunton
- Lieutenant Governor of British Columbia – Henry Pybus Bell-Irving
- Lieutenant Governor of Manitoba – Francis Lawrence Jobin
- Lieutenant Governor of New Brunswick – Hédard Robichaud
- Lieutenant Governor of Newfoundland – Gordon Arnaud Winter
- Lieutenant Governor of Nova Scotia – John Elvin Shaffner
- Lieutenant Governor of Ontario – Pauline Mills McGibbon
- Lieutenant Governor of Prince Edward Island – Gordon Lockhart Bennett
- Lieutenant Governor of Quebec – Jean-Pierre Côté
- Lieutenant Governor of Saskatchewan – Irwin McIntosh

==== Premiers ====
- Premier of Alberta – Peter Lougheed
- Premier of British Columbia – Bill Bennett
- Premier of Manitoba – Sterling Lyon
- Premier of New Brunswick – Richard Hatfield
- Premier of Newfoundland – Frank Moores (until March 26) then Brian Peckford
- Premier of Nova Scotia – John Buchanan
- Premier of Ontario – Bill Davis
- Premier of Prince Edward Island – Bennett Campbell (until May 3) then Angus MacLean
- Premier of Quebec – René Lévesque
- Premier of Saskatchewan – Allan Blakeney

=== Territorial governments ===
==== Commissioners ====
- Commissioner of Yukon – Frank Fingland (interim) (until January 20) then Ione Christensen (January 29 to October 6) then Douglas Bell
- Commissioner of Northwest Territories – Stuart Milton Hodgson (until April 15) then John Havelock Parker

==== Premiers ====
- Premier of Yukon – Chris Pearson

== Events ==
=== January to June ===
- January 17 – Edward Richard Schreyer replaces Jules Léger as Governor General
- February 1 – The first Winterlude is held in Ottawa
- February 24 – An explosion rips through Number 26 Colliery in Glace Bay, Cape Breton, killing 12 men.
- February 26 a total solar eclipse take place in the USA And Canada
- March 14 – Alberta election: Peter Lougheed's PCs win a third consecutive majority
- March 26 – Brian Peckford becomes premier of Newfoundland, replacing Frank Moores
- May 3 – Angus MacLean becomes premier of Prince Edward Island, replacing Bennett Campbell
- May 22 – Canadians go to the polls in the federal election. They defeat Pierre Trudeau's Liberals and elect Joe Clark's PCs, but only with a minority
- June 4
  - Joe Clark becomes Canada's sixteenth, and youngest ever, prime minister.
  - Flora MacDonald becomes Canada's first female Secretary of State for External Affairs.
- June 7 – The Sudbury Strike of 1978 ends after nine months.

=== July to December ===
- September 5 – Canada's first gold bullion coin goes on sale
- October 29 – Port-Harrison, Quebec, is renamed to Inukjuak
- November 10 – The 1979 Mississauga train derailment causes the evacuation of hundreds of thousands of people
- December 13 – Supreme Court declares Quebec and Manitoba's provincial legislatures to be unconstitutional because of their use of only one language.
- December 13 – The government is defeated on a non-confidence motion and Prime Minister Clark calls an election
- December 31 – A fire at Le Club Opemiska in Chapais, Quebec, kills 48 at a New Year's Eve party.

=== Full date unknown ===
- Chris Haney and Scott Abbott invent Trivial Pursuit
- Petro-Canada buys U.S.-controlled Pacific Petroleums
- The first women enroll in Canadian military colleges
- Founding of Academy of Canadian Cinema

== Arts and literature ==
=== New works ===
- Irving Layton: The Tightrope Dancer
- Margaret Atwood: Life Before Man
- Steve McCaffery: Intimate Distortions
- Roch Carrier: Les enfants du bonhomme dans la lune
- Joy Fielding: Trance
- Gabrielle Roy: Courte-Queue
- Gordon R. Dickson: The Spirit of Dorsai
- Farley Mowat: And No Birds Sang

=== Awards ===
- Antonine Maillet wins the French Prix Goncourt for her novel Pélagie-la-Charette
- See 1979 Governor General's Awards for a complete list of winners and finalists for those awards.
- Stephen Leacock Award – Sondra Gotlieb, True Confessions
- Vicky Metcalf Award – Cliff Faulknor

=== Television ===
- Lorne Michaels starts Broadway Video, a company that would go on to produce shows like The Kids in the Hall and Saturday Night Live
- You Can't Do That On Television premiers

== Sport ==
- March 18 – The Alberta Golden Bears win their fifth (second consecutive) University Cup by defeating the Dalhousie Tigers 5–1 in Montreal
- May 13 – The Peterborough Petes win their only Memorial Cup by defeating the Brandon Wheat Kings 2 to 1. The final game was played at Palais des Sports in Sherbrooke, Quebec
- May 21 – The Montreal Canadiens win their 22nd (fourth consecutive) Stanley Cup by defeating the New York Rangers 4 games to 1. The deciding Game 5 was played at the Montreal Forum. Peterborough, Ontario's Bob Gainey was awarded the Conn Smythe Trophy
- June 22 – The World Hockey Association folds. Four teams – the Edmonton Oilers, Winnipeg Jets, Quebec Nordiques and Hartford Whalers – survive and move to the NHL.
- September 1 – Pat Patterson wins the first World Wrestling Federation Intercontinental Champion
- September 8 – The Vancouver Whitecaps win their only Soccer Bowl by defeating the Tampa Bay Rowdies 2–1 at Soccer Bowl '79 played Giants Stadium in East Rutherford, New Jersey
- November 17 – The Acadia Axemen win their first Vanier Cup by defeating the Western Ontario Mustangs 34–12 in the 15th Vanier Cup played at Varsity Stadium in Toronto
- November 25 – The Edmonton Eskimos win their sixth (second consecutive) Grey Cup by defeating the Montreal Alouettes by the score 17 to 9 in the 67th Grey Cup played at Olympic Stadium at Montreal. Vancouver's Don Sweet is awarded his third Most Valuable Canadian award

== Births ==
=== January to June ===
- January 2 – Jagmeet Singh, Canadian politician, leader of the New Democratic Party
- January 8 – Sarah Polley, actress, singer, film director and screenwriter
- January 9 – Jenny Johnson, field hockey player
- January 14 – Nick Boynton, ice hockey player
- January 24 – Tom Kostopoulos, ice hockey player
- February 1 – Rachelle Lefevre, actress
- February 8 – Adam Trupish, boxer
- February 11 – Eric Cyr, baseball player
- February 15 – Ohenewa Akuffo, freestyle wrestler
- February 21 –
  - Andre Noble, actor (d. 2004)
  - Bryan Lee O'Malley, comic book writer and artist
- February 22
  - Patrick Merrill, lacrosse player
  - Jeremy Wilcox, volleyball player
- February 23 – Maryke Hendrikse, voice actress
- March 5 – Érik Bédard, pitcher
- March 7 – Stephanie Anne Mills, voice actress
- March 15 – Azelia Liu, field hockey player
- April 2 – Lindy Booth, actress
- April 4 – Roberto Luongo, ice hockey player
- April 11 – Sebastien Grainger, ice hockey player
- April 17 – Eric Brewer, ice hockey player
- May 2 – Jason Chimera, ice hockey player
- May 6 – Jon Montgomery, Canadian former skeleton racer and television personality; host of The Amazing Race Canada
- May 9 – Pierre Bouvier, singer
- May 10 – Dion Lavhey, Montreal Canadiens player
- May 11 – Erin Lang, singer-songwriter and guitarist
- May 12 – Adrian Serioux, soccer player
- May 20 – Andrew Scheer, politician
- June 1 – Craig Olejnik, actor
- June 3 – Pierre Poilievre, politician
- June 5 – Pete Wentz, musician
- June 8 – Pete Orr, baseball player
- June 18 – Chris Neil, ice hockey player
- June 24 – Fanny Létourneau, synchronized swimmer
- June 26 – Julia Benson, voice actress
- June 27 – Rebecca Jane Middleton, murder victim (d. 1996)
- June 30 – Christopher Jacot, film, television and voice actor

=== July to December ===
- July 2 – Joe Thornton, ice hockey player
- July 4 – Mark Twitchell, filmmaker and murderer
- July 7 – Shane Yellowbird, musician (d. 2022)
- July 13 – Holly Gauthier-Frankel, actress, voice director
- July 16 – Nathan Rogers, singer-songwriter
- August 3 – Evangeline Lilly, actress
- August 9 – Erin Chan, synchronized swimmer
- August 11 – Drew Nelson, actor and voice actor
- August 12 – Cindy Klassen, speed skater
- August 15 - Denise Oliver, voice actress
- August 22 – Jennifer Finnigan, actress
- August 31 – Mark Johnston, swimmer
- September 5 – Stacey Dales, basketball player and sportscaster
- September 15
  - Patrick Marleau, ice hockey player
  - Brett Youngberg, volleyball player
- September 17 – Chuck Comeau, drummer
- September 21 – Nathaniel Miller, water polo player
- October 7
  - Aaron Ashmore, actor
  - Shawn Ashmore, actor
- October 13 – Ryan Malcolm, singer (Low Level Flight) and winner of Canadian Idol
- November 14 – Randee Hermus, soccer player
- November 21 – Alex Tanguay, ice hockey player
- November 28 – Jamie Korab, curler
- November 30 – Diego Klattenhoff, Actor
- December 3 – Rainbow Sun Francks, actor and singer
- December 5 – RyanDan, identical twin musicians
- December 6 – Maxime Collin, child actor
- December 7 – Eric Bauza, comedian and voice actor (d. 2026)
- December 10 – Andrea Rushton, field hockey player
- December 15 – Eric Young, professional wrestler
- December 27 – Pascale Dorcelus, weightlifter
- December 28 – Bree Williamson, actress

== Deaths ==
- February 23 – W. A. C. Bennett, Premier of British Columbia (b. 1900)
- March 26 – Lionel Bertrand, politician, journalist and newspaper editor (b. 1906)
- May 9 – Cyrus S. Eaton, investment banker, businessman and philanthropist (b. 1883)
- May 15 – Dora Mavor Moore, actor, teacher and director (b. 1888)
- May 29 – Mary Pickford, actress and studio co-founder (b. 1892)
- July 11 – Claude Wagner, judge and politician (b. 1925)
- August 16 – John Diefenbaker, politician and 13th Prime Minister of Canada (b. 1895)
- September 28 – John Herbert Chapman, scientist and space researcher (b. 1921)
- November 24 – John Robert Cartwright, jurist and Chief Justice of Canada (b. 1895)
- December 19 – Donald Creighton, historian (b. 1902)

== See also ==
- 1979 in Canadian television
- List of Canadian films of 1979
