= 1976 in Canada =

- Decades: 1950s; 1960s; 1970s; 1980s; 1990s
- See also: History of Canada; Timeline of Canadian history; List of years in Canada

Events from the year 1976 in Canada.

== Incumbents ==
=== Crown ===
- Monarch – Elizabeth II

=== Federal government ===
- Governor General – Jules Léger
- Prime Minister – Pierre Trudeau
- Chief Justice – Bora Laskin (Ontario)
- Parliament – 30th

=== Provincial governments ===
==== Lieutenant governors ====
- Lieutenant Governor of Alberta – Ralph Steinhauer
- Lieutenant Governor of British Columbia – Walter Stewart Owen
- Lieutenant Governor of Manitoba – William John McKeag (until March 15) then Francis Lawrence Jobin
- Lieutenant Governor of New Brunswick – Hédard Robichaud
- Lieutenant Governor of Newfoundland – Gordon Arnaud Winter
- Lieutenant Governor of Nova Scotia – Clarence Gosse
- Lieutenant Governor of Ontario – Pauline Mills McGibbon
- Lieutenant Governor of Prince Edward Island – Gordon Lockhart Bennett
- Lieutenant Governor of Quebec – Hugues Lapointe
- Lieutenant Governor of Saskatchewan – Stephen Worobetz (until February 29) then George Porteous

==== Premiers ====
- Premier of Alberta – Peter Lougheed
- Premier of British Columbia – Bill Bennett
- Premier of Manitoba – Edward Schreyer
- Premier of New Brunswick – Richard Hatfield
- Premier of Newfoundland – Frank Moores
- Premier of Nova Scotia – Gerald Regan
- Premier of Ontario – Bill Davis
- Premier of Prince Edward Island – Alexander B. Campbell
- Premier of Quebec – Robert Bourassa (until November 25) then René Lévesque
- Premier of Saskatchewan – Allan Blakeney

=== Territorial governments ===
==== Commissioners ====
- Commissioner of Yukon – James Smith (until July 1) then Arthur MacDonald Pearson
- Commissioner of Northwest Territories – Stuart Milton Hodgson

== Events ==
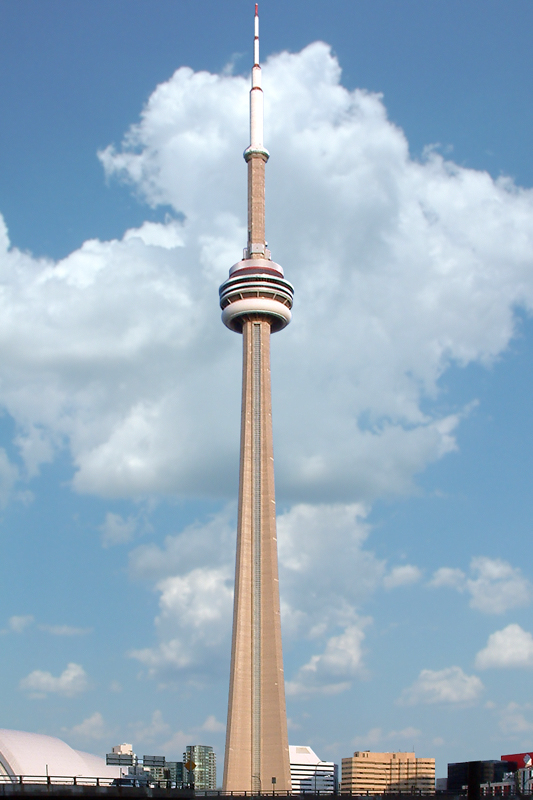
Toronto's CN Tower opens to the public

- January 14 – The Eaton's catalogue is discontinued.
- January 28 – The government of Saskatchewan takes over the province's potash industry.
- February 4 – The Supreme Court rules provinces cannot censor movies.
- February 7 – Joe Clark is elected leader of the Progressive Conservative Party of Canada, replacing Robert Stanfield.
- March 23 – The Norman Bethune Memorial unveiled in Montreal
- April 1 – The Canadian Radio-television and Telecommunications Commission is given the power to regulate Canadian television and radio.
- April 15 – Dome Petroleum is given approval to drill for oil in the Beaufort Sea.
- May 2 – Time's Canadian edition is discontinued.
- June 3–21 – 1976 CASAW wildcat strike in Kitimat, British Columbia, against Alcan management and wage and price controls.
- June 25 – The CN Tower opens to the public in Toronto.
- June 30 – St. Anne's Residential School closes.
- June 30 – Parliament votes to abolish the death penalty.
- July 17 – Opening Ceremony of the Montreal Summer Olympic.
- October 14 – the 1976 Canadian general strike: over a million workers stage a one-day strike to protest wage and price controls.
- November 15 – In the Quebec election, René Lévesque's Parti Québécois wins a majority, defeating Robert Bourassa's Parti libéral du Québec.
- November 25 – René Lévesque becomes premier of Quebec, replacing Robert Bourassa.

=== Full date unknown ===
- The Timbit is introduced (April 1976)
- L'Express de Toronto is created
- Tannereye Ltd company is established

== Arts and literature ==
=== New works ===
- Marian Engel: Bear
- Hugh Hood: Dark Glasses
- Joy Fielding: The Transformation
- Farley Mowat: Canada North Now: The Great Betrayal

=== Awards ===
- See 1976 Governor General's Awards for a complete list of winners and finalists for those awards.
- Stephen Leacock Award: Harry J. Boyle, The Luck of the Irish
- Vicky Metcalf Award: Suzanne Martel

=== Film ===
- The Man Who Skied Down Everest becomes the first Canadian dramatic film to win an Academy Award

=== Television ===
- Second City Television premiers

== Sport ==
- February 7 – Toronto Maple Leafs star Darryl Sittler scores ten points in one game.
- March 14 – The Toronto Varsity Blues win the University Cup by defeating the Guelph Gryphons 7–2 at Varsity Arena in Toronto
- May 16 – The Montreal Canadiens win their nineteenth Stanley Cup by defeating the Philadelphia Flyers 4 games to 0. Riverton, Manitoba's Reggie Leach becomes the first player to be awarded the Conn Smythe Trophy in a losing effort.
- May 16 – The Hamilton Fincups win their only Memorial Cup by defeating the New Westminster Bruins 5–2. All games were played at the Montreal Forum
- July 17 – Canada hosts its first Olympics when the 1976 Summer Olympics opens at Olympic Stadium in Montreal
- May 27 – The Winnipeg Jets win their first Avco Cup by defeating the Houston Aeros 4 games to 0. The deciding Game 4 was played at Winnipeg Arena
- August 28 – Toronto Metros-Croatia win their only Soccer Bowl, defeating the Minnesota Kicks 3–0 at Soccer Bowl '76 played at the Kingdome, in Seattle, Washington
- November 19 – The Western Ontario Mustangs win their third Vanier Cup by defeating the Acadia Axemen 29–13 in the 12th Vanier Cup played at Varsity Stadium in Toronto
- November 28 – The Ottawa Rough Riders win their ninth (and final) Grey Cup by defeating the Saskatchewan Roughriders by the score 23 to 20 in the 64th Grey Cup played at Exhibition Stadium in Toronto.

=== Full date unknown ===
- Walter Wolf Racing becomes first Canadian Formula One constructor.

== Births ==
=== January to March ===
- January 7 - Éric Gagné, baseball player
- January 23 - Phillip Boudreault, boxer
- February 19 - Brian Price, coxswain, Olympic gold medallist and World Champion
- February 23 - Jeff O'Neill, ice hockey player
- February 27 - Guillaume Lemay-Thivierge, actor
- March 9 - Ben Mulroney, television host
- March 15 - Cara Pifko, actress
- March 19 - Rachel Blanchard, actress
- March 23 - Nolan Baumgartner, ice hockey player

=== April to June ===
- April 3 - Daniel Lewis, volleyball player
- April 15 - Jason Bonsignore, ice hockey player
- April 16 - Maxime Giroux, film director
- May 8 - Martha Wainwright, American folk-pop singer
- May 10 - Kristen French, murder victim (d.1992)
- May 11 - Kardinal Offishall, rap musician and producer
- May 13 - Bobbi Jo Steadward, field hockey player
- May 19 - Jason Botterill, ice hockey player and manager
- June 5 - Marc Worden, voice actor
- June 6 - Emilie-Claire Barlow, actress and singer
- June 10 - James Moore, politician and Minister
- June 13 - Mark Versfeld, swimmer
- June 25 - Michelle Bowyer, field hockey player
- June 26 - Ed Jovanovski, ice hockey player

=== July to September ===
- July 3 - Wade Belak, ice hockey player (d.2011)
- July 5
  - Leslie Mahaffy, murder victim (d.1991)
  - Jamie Elman, American actor
- July 12 - Dan Boyle, ice hockey player
- July 13 - Sheldon Souray, ice hockey player
- July 17 - Amanda Lathlin, politician (d.2026)
- August 4 - David Lewis, actor
- August 5 - Jeff Friesen, ice hockey player
- August 17 - Eric Boulton, ice hockey player
- August 27 - Sarah Chalke, actress
- August 29 - Kasia Kulesza, Polish-born synchronised swimmer
- September 5 - Pat Thornton, comedian
- September 13 - José Théodore, ice hockey player
- September 17 - Zac Bierk, ice hockey player
- September 20 - Enuka Okuma, actress
- September 26 - Jean-François Marceau, judoka

=== October to December ===
- October 1 - Denis Gauthier, ice hockey player
- October 10 - Shane Doan, ice hockey player
- October 19 - Dan Smith, ice hockey player
- October 22 - Lisa Simes, artistic gymnast
- October 23 - Ryan Reynolds, actor
- November 6 - Catherine Clark, television broadcaster
- November 20 - Laura Harris, actress
- November 24 - Christian Laflamme, ice hockey player
- November 26 - Mathieu Darche, ice hockey player
- December 7 - Georges Laraque, ice hockey player
- December 26
  - Nadia Litz, actress
  - Jake Wetzel, rower, Olympic gold medallist and World Champion
- December 27 - Fernando Pisani, ice hockey player

== Deaths ==
=== January to June ===
- February 9 - Percy Faith, band-leader, orchestrator and composer (b.1908)
- March 3 - Alexander Wallace Matheson, politician and Premier of Prince Edward Island (b.1903)
- April 5 - Wilder Penfield, neurosurgeon (b.1891)
- April 11 - Art Alexandre, ice hockey player (b.1909)
- May 28 - William Ross Macdonald, politician, Speaker of the House of Commons of Canada and 21st Lieutenant Governor of Ontario (b.1891)
- June 10 - William John Patterson, politician and 6th Premier of Saskatchewan (b.1886)

=== July to December ===
- August 4 - Roy Thomson, 1st Baron Thomson of Fleet, newspaper proprietor and media entrepreneur (b.1894)
- August 8 - Wilson Duff, anthropologist (b.1925)
- August 28 - Lloyd Stinson, politician (b.1904)
- September 28 - Raymond Collishaw, World War I flying ace (b.1893)
- November 14 - Jean-Paul Beaulieu, politician and chartered accountant (b.1902)
- November 29 - Steve Peters, politician (b.1912)
- December 4 - Paul Gouin, politician (b.1898)
- December 16 - Réal Caouette, politician (b.1917)
- December 22 - Olive Diefenbaker, wife of John Diefenbaker, 13th Prime Minister of Canada (b.1902)

== See also ==
- 1976 in Canadian television
- List of Canadian films of 1976
