= 1974 Yukon general election =

Canadian territorial election

| ← 1970 | October 7, 1974 | 1978 → |

All 12 seats of the Yukon Territorial Council
- Turnout: 64.4% (▼2.5pp)

The 1974 Yukon general election was held on 7 October 1974 to elect the twelve members of the 23rd Yukon Territorial Council. The council consisted of 10 non-partisan and two members elected for the Yukon NDP. It had merely an advisory role to the federally appointed Commissioner for some departments, but had full responsibility for several departments through the appointment of three councillors to an executive committee.

This was the last election in the territory to the legislative council; beginning with the 1978 election, all subsequent elections in the territory have been to the expanded Yukon Legislative Assembly.

There were 38 candidates. Out of a potential 9,542 electors, 6,145 people cast ballots for a voter turnout of 64.4 per cent.

== Results ==
Candidates by district
| District | Winner | Second | Third | Fourth | Fifth |
|---|---|---|---|---|---|
| Hootalinqua | Robert Fleming; 262 | John Owens; 68 | Edward Whiffin; 22 | | |
| Klondike | Fred Berger (NDP); 137 | Willie Asp; 134 | Howard Tracey; 120 | George Wing; 32 | |
| Kluane | Hilda Watson; 123 | John Livesey; 106 | Bob MacKinnon; 97 | Ray Jackson; 57 | Jack Brewster; 43 |
| Mayo | Gordon McIntyre; 199 | V.B.P. Mills; 154 | | | |
| Ogilvie | Eleanor Millard; 173 | Chitzi Charlie Abel; 52 | Curtiss Bruce Davis; 34 | | |
| Pelly River | Stuart McCall (NDP); 187 | Paul White; 177 | Barry Redfern; 160 | | |
| Watson Lake | Don Taylor; 223 | Johnny Friend; 110 | Harry Godfrey; 107 | | |
| Whitehorse North Centre | Ken McKinnon; 458 | John Hoyt; 182 | | | |
| Whitehorse Porter Creek | Daniel Lang; 356 | Jack Burrows; 144 | Joe Lindsay; 105 | Alder Hunter; 74 | |
| Whitehorse Riverdale | Willard Phelps; 439 | Don Branigan; 340 | Steve Henke; 81 | | |
| Whitehorse South Centre | Jack Hibberd; 267 | Tony Penikett; 143 | Ron Veale; 130 | | |
| Whitehorse West | Flo Whyard; 252 | John Watt; 227 | Al Omotani; 116 | | |
