= 1978 in Canada =

- Decades: 1950s; 1960s; 1970s; 1980s; 1990s
- See also: History of Canada; Timeline of Canadian history; List of years in Canada

Events from the year 1978 in Canada.

== Incumbents ==
=== Crown ===
- Monarch – Elizabeth II

=== Federal government ===
- Governor General – Jules Léger
- Prime Minister – Pierre Trudeau
- Chief Justice – Bora Laskin (Ontario)
- Parliament – 30th

=== Provincial governments ===
==== Lieutenant governors ====
- Lieutenant Governor of Alberta – Ralph Steinhauer
- Lieutenant Governor of British Columbia – Walter Stewart Owen (until May 18) then Henry Pybus Bell-Irving
- Lieutenant Governor of Manitoba – Francis Lawrence Jobin
- Lieutenant Governor of New Brunswick – Hédard Robichaud
- Lieutenant Governor of Newfoundland – Gordon Arnaud Winter
- Lieutenant Governor of Nova Scotia – Clarence Gosse (until December 23) then John Elvin Shaffner
- Lieutenant Governor of Ontario – Pauline Mills McGibbon
- Lieutenant Governor of Prince Edward Island – Gordon Lockhart Bennett
- Lieutenant Governor of Quebec – Hugues Lapointe (until April 27) then Jean-Pierre Côté
- Lieutenant Governor of Saskatchewan – George Porteous (until February 6) then Irwin McIntosh (from February 22)

==== Premiers ====
- Premier of Alberta – Peter Lougheed
- Premier of British Columbia – Bill Bennett
- Premier of Manitoba – Sterling Lyon
- Premier of New Brunswick – Richard Hatfield
- Premier of Newfoundland – Frank Moores
- Premier of Nova Scotia – Gerald Regan (until October 5) then John Buchanan
- Premier of Ontario – Bill Davis
- Premier of Prince Edward Island – Alexander B. Campbell (until September 18) then Bennett Campbell
- Premier of Quebec – René Lévesque
- Premier of Saskatchewan – Allan Blakeney

=== Territorial governments ===
==== Commissioners ====
- Commissioner of Yukon – Arthur MacDonald Pearson (until November 1) then Frank Fingland (interim)
- Commissioner of Northwest Territories – Stuart Milton Hodgson

==== Premiers ====
- Premier of Yukon – Chris Pearson (from December 14)

== Events ==
- January 12 – Via Rail Canada is established as a Crown corporation
- January 24 – Cosmos 954, a Soviet satellite, breaks up over northern Canada.
- June 26 – An Air Canada DC-9 overruns a runway in Toronto. Two people die.
- August 4 – 41 are killed when a bus plunges into a lake near Eastman, Quebec.
- September 15 – The Sudbury Strike of 1978 begins.
- September 18 – Bennett Campbell becomes premier of Prince Edward Island, replacing Alexander B. Campbell
- October 5 – John MacLennan Buchanan becomes premier of Nova Scotia, replacing Gerald Regan
- October 16 – At midnight after a year and a half of conciliation the Canadian Union of Postal Workers goes on strike.
- October 16 – Fifteen federal by-elections are held across the country. The governing Liberals lose five seats, which leads to a general election the following May.
- October 17 – Parliament votes to force the postal workers back to work.
- October 18 – Saskatchewan election: Allan Blakeney's NDP win a third consecutive majority. Despite accusations of marital infidelity, Colin Thatcher, who would later be involved in the murder of his ex-wife, is re-elected to the Saskatchewan Legislative Assembly.
- December 14 – Chris Pearson becomes government leader of Yukon as responsible government is instituted

=== Full date unknown ===
- Rexdale Women's Centre is founded in Toronto.
- Supreme Court of Canada declares unilingual legislatures and courts unconstitutional
- Under the new immigration act homosexuals are no longer an inadmissible class

== Arts and literature ==
=== New works ===
- Margaret Atwood: Up in the Tree
- Mordecai Richler: The Great Comic Book Heroes and Other Essays
- John Newlove: The Fat Man: Selected Poems (1962–1972)
- John Gray and Eric Peterson: Billy Bishop Goes to War
- Henry Beissel: Goya

=== Awards ===
- Alice Munro's Who Do You Think You Are? is nominated for the Booker Prize
- See 1979 Governor General's Awards for a complete list of winners and finalists for those awards.
- Stephen Leacock Award: Ernest Buckler, Whirligig
- Vicky Metcalf Award: Lyn Cook

== Sport ==
- March 19 – Alberta Golden Bears win their fourth University Cup by defeating the Toronto Varsity Blues 6–5. The final game was played at Moncton Coliseum
- May 13 – New Westminster Bruins win the second (consecutive) Memorial Cup by defeating the Peterborough Petes 7–4. The final game was played at Sudbury Community Arena
- May 22 – Winnipeg Jets win their second Avco Cup by defeating the New England Whalers 4 games to 0.
- May 25 – Montreal Canadiens win their 21st (third consecutive) Stanley Cup by defeating the Boston Bruins 4 games to 2. Winchester, Ontario's Larry Robinson was awarded the Conn Smythe Trophy
- July 15 – Commonwealth Stadium opens in Edmonton
- August 3 to 12 – The Commonwealth Games are held in Edmonton
- October 10 – Wayne Gretzky plays his first professional game for the Indianapolis Racers and would be traded to the Edmonton Oilers after 25 games
- November 18 – Queen's Golden Gaels win their second Vanier Cup by defeating the UBC Thunderbirds 16–3 in the 14th Vanier Cup played at Varsity Stadium in Toronto
- November 26 – Edmonton Eskimos win their fifth Grey Cup by defeating the Montreal Alouettes 20–13 in the 66th Grey Cup played at Exhibition Stadium in Toronto. Hamilton, Ontario's Angelo Santucci was named the game's Most Valuable Canadian

== Births ==
=== January to March ===
- January 3 - Daryn Jones, comedian and television and radio personality
- January 6 - Nikki Einfeld, operatic soprano and actress
- January 24 – Mark Hildreth, actor
- January 25 – Gordie Dwyer, ice hockey player and coach
- January 27 - Pete Laforest, Canadian-American baseball player and manager
- February 20 - Andrea Moody, swimmer
- February 26 - Kyle Hamilton, rower, Olympic gold medallist and World Champion
- March 9 - Chris Phillips, ice hockey player

=== April to June ===
- April 1 - Jean-Pierre Dumont, ice hockey player
- April 6 - Thomas Herschmiller, rower, Olympic silver medallist and World Champion
- April 10 - Scott Roberts, voice actor
- April 18 - Alexis Mazurin, comedian and radio personality (d.2005)
- April 29 - Tyler Labine, actor
- May 3 - Autumn Kelly the wife of Peter Phillips
- May 12
  - Aaron Abrams, actor
  - Amy Sloan, actress
- May 15
  - Dwayne De Rosario, soccer player
  - Caroline Dhavernas, actress
- May 25 - Adam Gontier, singer and guitarist
- June 2 - Shane Niemi, sprint athlete
- June 11 - Joshua Jackson, Canadian actor
- June 13 - Matt Bradley, ice hockey player
- June 14 - Steve Bégin, ice hockey player
- June 21 – Erica Durance, actress
- June 24 – Geoff Keighley, video game journalist
- June 28 - Simon Larose, tennis player

=== July to December ===
- July 4 - Marie Luc Arpin, water polo player
- July 11 - Kathleen Edwards, singer-songwriter
- July 22 - A. J. Cook, actress
- August 4 - Karine Legault, swimmer
- August 24 – Derek Morris, ice hockey player
- August 28 – Karine Turcotte, weightlifter
- September 1 - Joe Stankevicius, rower and World Champion
- September 5 - Laura Bertram, actress
- September 6 - Amy Agulay, field hockey player
- September 7 - Matt Cooke, ice hockey player
- September 7 - Devon Sawa, actor
- September 17 -
  - Shawn Horcoff, ice hockey player
  - Nick Cordero, actor and singer
- September 20 - Jason Bay, baseball player
- September 21 - Paulo Costanzo, actor
- September 22 - Steve Moore, ice hockey player
- October 17 - Erin Karpluk, actress
- November 16 - Steve Omischl, freestyle skier
- November 17 - Rachel McAdams, actress
- December 2 - Nelly Furtado, singer-songwriter, record producer and actress
- December 23 - Esthero, singer-songwriter

== Deaths ==
- March 25 - Charles Alexander Best, politician (b. 1931)
- March 31 - Charles Best, medical scientist, co-discoverer of insulin (b. 1899)
- April 13 - Jack Chambers, artist and filmmaker (b. 1931)
- July 18 - Claude P. Dettloff, photographer (b. 1899)
- September 9 - Jack L. Warner, studio mogul (b. 1892)
- September 28 - Thane Campbell, jurist, politician and Premier of Prince Edward Island (b. 1895)
- October 23 - Joe Greene, politician (b. 1920)

=== Full date unknown ===
- Carl Ray, artist (b. 1943)

== See also ==
- 1978 in Canadian television
- List of Canadian films of 1978
