= Andrew Harold Gibson =

Commissioner Andrew Harold Gibson

Commissioner of Yukon
- In office August 15, 1950 – October 15, 1951
- Prime Minister: Louis St. Laurent
- Preceded by: John Edward Gibben
- Succeeded by: Frederick Fraser

Personal details
- Born: 1883 Lanark, Ontario, Canada
- Died: 1971 (aged 87–88)
- Spouse: Lena Paton

Andrew Harold Gibson was the commissioner of Yukon from 1950 to 1951. He was preceded by John Edward Gibben and succeeded by Frederick Fraser. He died in 1971 in Whitehouse Territory, Yukon, Canada.
