= Peter Jenkins (politician) =

Canadian politician (1944–2021)

Mayor of Dawson City, Yukon
- In office 1980–1994
- Preceded by: Vi Campbell
- Succeeded by: Art Webster
- In office 2009–2012
- Preceded by: John Steins
- Succeeded by: Wayne Potoroka

MLA for Klondike
- In office September 30, 1996 – October 10, 2006
- Preceded by: David Millar
- Succeeded by: Steve Nordick

Deputy Premier of the Yukon
- In office November 30, 2002 – November 28, 2005
- Premier: Dennis Fentie
- Preceded by: Office established
- Succeeded by: Elaine Taylor

Minister of Health and Social Services
- In office November 30, 2002 – November 28, 2005
- Premier: Dennis Fentie
- Preceded by: Sue Edelman
- Succeeded by: Brad Cathers

Minister of the Environment
- In office July 12, 2004 – November 28, 2005
- Premier: Dennis Fentie
- Preceded by: Jim Kenyon
- Succeeded by: Dennis Fentie

Leader of the Yukon Party Acting
- In office April 17, 2000 – June 15, 2002
- Preceded by: John Ostashek
- Succeeded by: Dennis Fentie

Personal details
- Born: April 30, 1944 Montreal, Quebec, Canada
- Died: October 2, 2021 (aged 77) Vancouver, British Columbia, Canada
- Party: Yukon Party (1996-2005); Independent (2005-2006)
- Occupation: Hotelier

Peter William Jenkins (April 30, 1944 – October 2, 2021) was a Canadian politician, who served as deputy premier and health minister in the territorial government of the Yukon, and as mayor of Dawson City.

== Biography ==
Jenkins, a hotelier, first ran for the territorial legislature in 1989, but lost to NDP cabinet minister Art Webster. Jenkins' campaign manager at that time was future Liberal Premier Pat Duncan.

Prior to entering provincial politics, he served as mayor of Dawson City from 1980 to 1994, earning the nickname "Pirate Pete" after he registered for satellite television service under the name of a dead local pioneer and then redistributed the television signals to residents of Dawson City for free.

Jenkins was first elected to the Yukon Legislative Assembly in the 1996 election in Klondike for the Yukon Party. He defended his seat in the 2000 election, the only Yukon Party member to do so. He assumed the leadership of the party after the election. He held the position as sole MLA and leader until May and June 2002, when Dennis Fentie crossed the floor from the NDP and won the party's leadership, defeating Jenkins and former party president Darcy Tkachuk.

Jenkins defended his seat successfully in the 2002 general election and was sworn into cabinet in November, serving as Health Minister and Deputy Premier until November 28, 2005 when he resigned from the party and cabinet. Jenkins said this was because "the heart and soul of my community has been ripped out by the inefficiences of government at the municipal level, the territorial level." Fentie told the press at the time it was due to the ongoing loans file, which involved Jenkins owing $300,000 to the territorial government, in which he served as minister. This eventually was cleared off the books in March 2006.

Jenkins sat as an Independent MLA in the Assembly until dissolution, and chose not to run in the 2006 general election. Jenkins later ran for another term as mayor of Dawson City in the 2009 municipal election, defeating incumbent John Steins by seven votes. He was defeated in the 2012 municipal election by Wayne Potoroka.

At the age of 77, Jenkins died from COVID-19 at a hospital in Vancouver, British Columbia, on October 2, 2021 during the COVID-19 pandemic in British Columbia.

== Electoral record ==
=== Yukon general election, 2002 ===
Klondike
Party	Candidate	Votes	%	±%
Yukon Party	Peter Jenkins	508	54.2%	+14.8%
Liberal	Glen Everitt	224	22.9%	-14.0%
NDP	Lisa Hutton	200	21.3%	-1.9%
Total		937	100.0%	–

=== Yukon general election, 2000 ===
Klondike
Party	Candidate	Votes	%	±%
Yukon Party	Peter Jenkins	424	39.4%	-15.5%
Liberal	Stuart Schmidt	397	36.9%	+28.2%
NDP	Aedes Scheer	249	23.2%	-10.7%
Total		1,075	100.0%	–

=== Yukon general election, 1996 ===
Klondike
Party	Candidate	Votes	%	±%
Yukon Party	Peter Jenkins	603	54.9%	+2.0%
NDP	Tim Gerberding	372	33.9%	-12.0%
Liberal	Glen Everitt	96	8.8%	+8.8%
Independent	John Cramp	21	1.9%	+1.9%
Total		1,099	100.0%	–
