= Order of Yukon =

Civilian honour for merit in Canada

- Insignia of the Order of Yukon

Awarded by the commissioner of Yukon
- Type: Order of merit (territorial)
- Eligibility: All current and former residents of the territory who are not elected representatives in government
- Awarded for: Significant contributions to the advancement of Yukon society.
- Status: Currently constituted
- Chancellor: Adeline Webber
- Grades: Member
- Post-nominals: OY

Statistics
- First induction: January 1, 2020
- Total inductees: 34

Precedence
- Next (higher): Order of the Northwest Territories
- Next (lower): Star of Military Valour
- Ribbon bar of the order

The Order of Yukon (Note: French: Ordre du Yukon) is a civilian honour for merit in the Canadian territory of Yukon. Instituted in 2018, with its first members inducted in 2019, it is the highest honour which can be bestowed by the Government of Yukon. It is intended to honour current and former residents of the territory.

== Creation and history ==
Prior to the creation of the Order of Yukon, an unofficial order, the Order of Polaris, was created in 1973 largely to celebrate members of Canada's Aviation Hall of Fame but was not part of the Canadian honours system. Yukon was the only province or territory in Canada without a domestic order from 2015, when the Order of the Northwest Territories was created, until the Order of Yukon's establishment.

The Order of Yukon was first proposed in 2016, following public consultation. The order was created by the passage of the Order of Yukon Act in 2018. The award is modelled on the orders of the Canadian provinces. Inductees are entitled to use the postnominal letters OY.

The call for nominations was first announced in late May 2019 with the first ceremony set for New Year's Day for 2020. The first 10 recipients were named ahead of the ceremony on December 2, 2019.

== Eligibility and advisory committee ==
Potential members are recommended to the chancellor by an advisory council consisting of the Speaker of the Yukon Legislative Assembly, the chief justice of the Supreme Court of Yukon, secretary of the Executive Council of Yukon, the president of Yukon University, two individuals chosen by the chancellor, and one individual chosen by the Council of Yukon First Nations.

The commissioner of Yukon bestows the award and is an ex officio member as the order's chancellor.

== Members ==
Chancellors

- Angélique Bernard (2018)
- Adeline Webber (2023)

2019

- Doug Bell
- Ione Christensen
- Patricia Ellis
- Judy Gingell
- Percy Henry
- Gary Hewitt
- Rolf Hougen
- Dave Joe
- Sam Johnston
- Lyall Murdoch

2020

- Bess Cooley
- Keith Byram
- Doug Phillips
- Jack Cable
- William Klassen
- Frances Woolsey
- Sally MacDonald
- Gertie Tom
- Agnes Mills
- Ron Veale

2021

- Peter Menzies
- David Mossop
- David Storey

2022

- Danny Joe
- Jeanne Beaudoin
- Murray Lundberg

2023

- Yann Herry
- Tim Koepke
- David Stockdale

2024

- Nesta Leduc
- Mary Sloan
- Rudy Couture

== See also ==
- Symbols of Yukon
- Orders, decorations, and medals of the Canadian provinces
- Canadian honours order of wearing
