= Kathy Watson (Canadian politician) =

Canadian politician

Mayor of Whitehorse
- In office 1994–2000
- Preceded by: Bill Weigand
- Succeeded by: Ernie Bourassa

Personal details
- Born: 1953 or 1954 (age 71–72)

Kathy Watson (born 1953 or 1954) is a former Canadian politician, who served as mayor of Whitehorse, Yukon from 1994 to 2000.

First elected to Whitehorse City Council in 1991, she won election to the mayoralty in 1994.

Late in her term, she faced criticism for approving a plan to contribute municipal funding to a controversial shopping mall development in the city.

She did not run for another term in the 2000 municipal election, and was succeeded by Ernie Bourassa. She is currently a government relations manager with the Natural Health Practitioners of Canada Association.
