= Bert Wybrew =

Canadian politician and former mayor

Mayor of Whitehorse, Yukon
- In office 1968–1973
- Preceded by: Howard Firth
- Succeeded by: Paul Lucier

Personal details
- Born: 1916 or 1917 Whitehorse, Yukon, Canada
- Died: October 16, 2004 (aged 87) Vancouver, British Columbia, Canada
- Spouse: Betty
- Occupation: businessman

Albert James Wybrew (1916 or 1917 – October 16, 2004) was a Canadian politician, who served as mayor of Whitehorse, Yukon from 1968 to 1973.

Prior to his election to the mayoralty, Wybrew was a business partner with Neil Colville in Whitehorse's cable television company, WHTV. He first won the municipal election in December 1967, campaigning on a platform of opposing the city's installation of parking meters. However, on the basis of alleged voter irregularities, Justice John Parker overturned the election results on January 18, 1968, ordering a new by-election. Wybrew won the by-election on March 14.

In the 1969 election, Wybrew was returned by acclamation. In 1970, Wybrew and territorial commissioner James Smith hosted the first visit to Yukon by Governor General Roland Michener and his wife Norah Michener. He was reelected to a third two-year term as mayor in 1971.

In 1973, governance of the city was temporarily transferred to a taxpayer advisory committee led by Joseph Oliver for part of the summer, after five of the city's six councillors resigned on July 9, 1973, in protest against a jurisdictional dispute with the Yukon Territorial Council, leaving the council without a quorum to conduct city business; Smith also dismissed Wybrew as mayor during this committee governance period. Following a by-election on September 20, 1973, Wybrew returned to office and served until December.

Wybrew did not run for reelection in December 1973, and was succeeded as mayor by Paul Lucier. Wybrew died in Vancouver from cancer on October 16, 2004, at the age of 87, and was predeceased by his wife one month prior.
