= Gordon Armstrong (politician) =

Canadian politician

Mayor of Whitehorse, Yukon
- In office 1950–1958
- Preceded by: Office established
- Succeeded by: Gordon Cameron

Personal details
- Born: Herbert Gordon Armstrong; 1905 Whitewood, Saskatchewan
- Died: April 28, 1993 (aged 87–88) Kelowna, British Columbia

Herbert Gordon Armstrong (1905 - 1993) was a Canadian politician, who served as mayor of Whitehorse, Yukon from 1950 to 1958.

Born in Whitewood, Saskatchewan, Armstrong moved to Whitehorse to work as a butcher for the Burns Meat Packing Company.

He won election in 1950 as Whitehorse's first mayor. When he was first elected mayor, Whitehorse was still a small frontier town with little municipal infrastructure and no city hall; the council rented meeting rooms from various commercial companies until taking over a vacated Canadian Army building. Initially challenged by the city's almost complete lack of any significant tax base to fund municipal services, Armstrong soon oversaw a rapid influx of federal government funding after Whitehorse was named the new capital city of Yukon in 1951.

In 1954, Armstrong left his job with the Burns Company to launch Yukon Sales, a wholesaler which imported and transported commercial goods not widely available in the territory. In his capacity as mayor, in the same year he launched the most ambitious program of his term, winning a plebiscite on a $10 per month municipal tax to fund the construction of the city's water and sewer systems.

He stepped down as mayor in 1958, and moved to Vancouver, British Columbia, in 1962. He remained a partner in Yukon Sales, making regular business trips back to Whitehorse. In 1978, he was granted the honorary title of Mayor Emeritus by the incumbent city council.

He died on April 28, 1993, in Kelowna, British Columbia. The day after his death, statements of tribute were delivered in the Legislative Assembly of Yukon by MLAs Doug Phillips and Tony Penikett.
