= Frederick Fraser =

Frederick Fraser may refer to:

- Frederick Fraser (politician) (1895–1990), politician in the Yukon
- Charles Frederick Fraser (1850–1925), Canadian educator
- Frederic Charles Fraser (1880–1963), English entomologist
