= Walt Lengerke =

Canadian politician (1935–2002)

Member of the Yukon Territorial Council for Whitehorse Riverdale
- In office November 3, 1975 – 1978
- Preceded by: Willard Phelps
- Succeeded by: riding redistributed

Personal details
- Born: September 4, 1935 Cranbrook, British Columbia, Canada
- Died: July 7, 2002 (aged 66) Comox, British Columbia, Canada
- Occupation: city manager

Walter Frank Wolfgang von Lengerke (September 4, 1935 – July 7, 2002) was a Canadian politician, who represented Whitehorse Riverdale on the Yukon Territorial Council from 1975 to 1978.

Prior to his election to the territorial council, Lengerke served as city manager of Whitehorse. After Willard Phelps was disqualified from office on a conflict of interest ruling in 1975, Lengerke ran in the resulting by-election on November 3, which he won over future Whitehorse mayor Don Branigan. In one of his first actions on the council, he proposed a motion to limit the number of trucking permits that could be issued to trucking firms from outside Yukon, but he soon withdrew the motion on the grounds that it needed further study.

He served as chair of the council's constitutional committee. In November 1977, he tabled a motion calling for Yukon to be upgraded to provincial status; although the motion did not succeed, the committee's work led to the introduction of party politics in Yukon in 1978, and the dissolution of the territorial council in favour of the new, fully democratic Legislative Assembly of Yukon.

He did not run for reelection in the 1978 Yukon general election. He cited several reasons including a desire to spend more time with his family, a reluctance to working within the confines of partisan politics and an uncertainty about which district to even run in given that Whitehorse Riverdale was being split in the new redistribution of electoral boundaries. He ran for mayor of Whitehorse in the 1979 by-election that followed Ione Christensen's appointment as Commissioner of Yukon, but lost to Branigan.
