= Paul Lucier =

Canadian businessman and politician

The Honourable Paul Lucier

Senator for Yukon
- In office 1975–1999
- Appointed by: Pierre Trudeau
- Succeeded by: Ione Christensen

Mayor of Whitehorse
- In office 1974–1976
- Preceded by: Bert Wybrew
- Succeeded by: Ione Christensen

Personal details
- Born: July 29, 1930 LaSalle, Ontario, Canada
- Died: July 23, 1999 (aged 68) Penticton, British Columbia, Canada

Paul Lucier (July 29, 1930 – July 23, 1999) was a Canadian businessman and Senator.

Born in LaSalle, Ontario, the son of Adolph Lucier and Claire Laframboise, he was appointed by Pierre Trudeau the first Senator representing the senatorial division of Yukon in 1975. Sitting as a Liberal, he served until his death in 1999.

On arrival in the Yukon, he served as a deckhand on the SS Klondike, one of the few still operating river steamers. He later also served as a city councillor for Whitehorse City Council in Whitehorse, Yukon for several years, including serving as mayor in 1974–75.

Lucier was married to his wife, Grace, and had children Edward, Frances, and Tom. He died in Penticton, British Columbia in 1999.
