= Bev Buckway =

Canadian politician and curler

Mayor of Whitehorse, Yukon
- In office 2006–2012
- Preceded by: Ernie Bourassa
- Succeeded by: Dan Curtis

Personal details
- Born: 1954 (age 71–72) Whitehorse, Yukon

Beverly "Bev" Buckway (born 1954 in Whitehorse, Yukon) is a former Canadian politician, who served as mayor of Whitehorse, Yukon, from 2006 to 2012.

Buckway was first elected to Whitehorse City Council in 2003. During her terms on council, she served as president of the Association of Yukon Communities for two terms, and as an executive member of the Federation of Canadian Municipalities. She was a task force member for the Review of Yukon's Police Force that resulted in the Sharing Common Ground report. In 2012, Buckway received the Queen Elizabeth II Diamond Jubilee Medal for her municipal contributions.

Buckway is a past president of Rotary International and a Paul Harris Fellow. As a former curler, Buckway represented the Yukon at the Scott Tournament of Hearts and as a former volleyball player at the Arctic Winter Games and the Canada Winter Games.
