= List of Canadian films of 1976 =

This is a list of Canadian films which were released in 1976:

Title	Director	Cast	Genre	Notes
The Absence (L'Absence)	Brigitte Sauriol		Drama	
Blackwood	Andy Thomson & Tony Ianzelo	David Blackwood	NFB documentary	Academy Award nominee
Breaking Point	Bob Clark	Bo Svensen, Robert Culp, Belinda Montgomery, Stephen Young	Drama	Made with U.S. financing
Brethren	Dennis Zahoruk	Thomas Hauff, Kenneth Welsh	Drama	
The Clown Murders	Martyn Burke	Stephen Young, Susan Keller, Lawrence Dane	Crime, mystery	
Cooperage	Phillip Borsos		Documentary	Canadian Film Award – Theatrical Short
Cotton Mill, Treadmill (On est au coton)	Denys Arcand		NFB documentary	This controversial 1971 documentary about the Quebec textile industry was held back from release by the NFB for 5 years.
Death Weekend	William Fruet	Brenda Vaccaro, Don Stroud, Chuck Shamata	Horror	
Dreamspeaker	Claude Jutra	Ian Tracey, George Clutesi, Jacques Hubert	CBC-TV drama	
East End Hustle	Frank Vitale	Allan Moyle	Drama	
Far from You Sweetheart (Je suis loin de toi mignonne)	Claude Fournier	Dominique Michel, Denise Filiatrault	Comedy	
The Far Shore	Joyce Weiland	Céline Lomez, Frank Moore, Lawrence Benedict, Sean McCann	Drama	Canadian Film Awards – Supporting Actor (Moore), Art Direction, Cinematography
Find the Lady	John Trent	Lawrence Dane, John Candy, Dick Emery, Mickey Rooney	Comedy	
The Flower Between the Teeth (La fleur aux dents)	Thomas Vámos	Claude Jutra, Anne Dandurand, Lise Lasalle, Serge Thériault	Drama	
For Gentlemen Only	Michael Scott	Ed McNamara, Hugh Webster	Short drama	
Goldenrod	Harvey Hart	Tony LoBianco, Donald Pleasence, Gloria Carlin, Donnelly Rhodes	Drama	Canadian Film Award – Director
High Grass Circus	Tony Ianzelo, Torben Schioler		Documentary	
Ilsa, Harem Keeper of the Oil Sheiks	Don Edmonds	Dyanne Thorne, Max Thayer	Sexploitation thriller	
The Keeper	Thomas Y. Drake	Christopher Lee	Horror	
The Last Cause	Alex Cramer	Warren Davis	Documentary	
Let's Talk About Love (Parlez-nous d'amour)	Jean-Claude Lord		Drama	
The Little Girl Who Lives Down the Lane	Nicolas Gessner	Jodie Foster, Martin Sheen	Horror-thriller	
Little Tougas (Ti-Cul Tougas)	Jean-Guy Noël	Claude Maher, Gilbert Sicotte, Micheline Lanctôt	Drama	
Love at First Sight	Rex Bromfield	Mary Ann McDonald, Dan Aykroyd	Romance	Dan Aykroyd's first film
Mahoney's Last Stand	Harvey Hart	Alexis Kanner, Maud Adams, Sam Waterston	Drama	
The Man from the Movies (Le gars des vues)	Jean Pierre Lefebvre		Drama	
Mindscape (Le paysagiste)	Jacques Drouin		Animated short	
Naked Massacre	Denis Héroux	Mathieu Carrière, Debra Berger, Christine Boisson	Thriller	
A Pacemaker and a Sidecar (L'Eau chaude, l'eau frette)	André Forcier			
Partners	Don Owen	Hollis McLaren, Denholm Elliott, Michael Margotta, Robert A. Silverman	Thriller	
Second Wind	Don Shebib	James Naughton, Lindsay Wagner, Ken Pogue	Drama	Canadian Film Award – Supporting Actress (Moore), Editing
Shadow of the Hawk	George McCowan	Jan-Michael Vincent, Marilyn Hassett, Chief Dan George	Horror	Made with U.S. financing
Shoot	Harvey Hart	Cliff Robertson, Ernest Borgnine, Henry Silva	Action, adventure	
The Street	Caroline Leaf		NFB animated short based on a Mordecai Richler short story	Nominated for the Academy Award for Best Animated Short Film at the 49th Academy Awards; AV Preservation Trust Masterwork
The Supreme Kid	Peter Bryant	Frank Moore, Jim Henshaw, Helen Shaver	Comedy	
A Sweeter Song	Allan Eastman	Jim Henshaw, Susan Petrie, Susan Hogan, Peter Jobin	Comedy	Eastman's debut, Nick Mancuso's first appearance on screen
Symbiosis	David Cox		Animated short	
Volcano: An Inquiry into the Life and Death of Malcolm Lowry	Donald Brittain, John Kramer	Narration by Donald Brittain; readings by Richard Burton	NFB documentary	Academy Award nominee; Canadian Film Awards – Non-Feature Direction, Non-Feature Screenplay, Non-Feature Editing, Non-Feature Sound, Non-Feature Musical Score, Documentary

== See also ==
- 1976 in Canada
- 1976 in Canadian television
