= Ogilvie (electoral district) =

Former territorial electoral district in the Yukon, Canada

Ogilvie was a territorial electoral district in the Canadian territory of Yukon, which was represented on the Yukon Territorial Council from 1974 to 1978. The district comprised part of Dawson City, extending northerly to the Ogilvie Mountains region, while the southerly part of Dawson City was in the separate district of Klondike. The idea of splitting Dawson City in this manner was controversial, however, due to a perceived risk that if both Ogilvie and Klondike elected councillors who lived in their districts' other, smaller communities, Dawson City itself would have been left effectively unrepresented on the council despite being the most important community in both districts; in the 1974 Yukon general election, however, Dawson City residents won both districts, with Eleanor Millard winning in Ogilvie while Fred Berger carried Klondike.

It was one of four districts, alongside Pelly River, Whitehorse Porter Creek and Whitehorse Riverdale, which existed only for the 1974 election; the districts were newly created in 1974 when the territorial council was expanded from seven to 12 members, but Ogilvie was redistricted back into Klondike when the new Legislative Assembly of Yukon was established.

Millard was the district's sole representative before it was redistricted.

== See also ==
- List of Yukon territorial electoral districts
- Canadian provincial electoral districts
