= Sandy Silver =

Canadian politician

The Honourable Sandy Silver
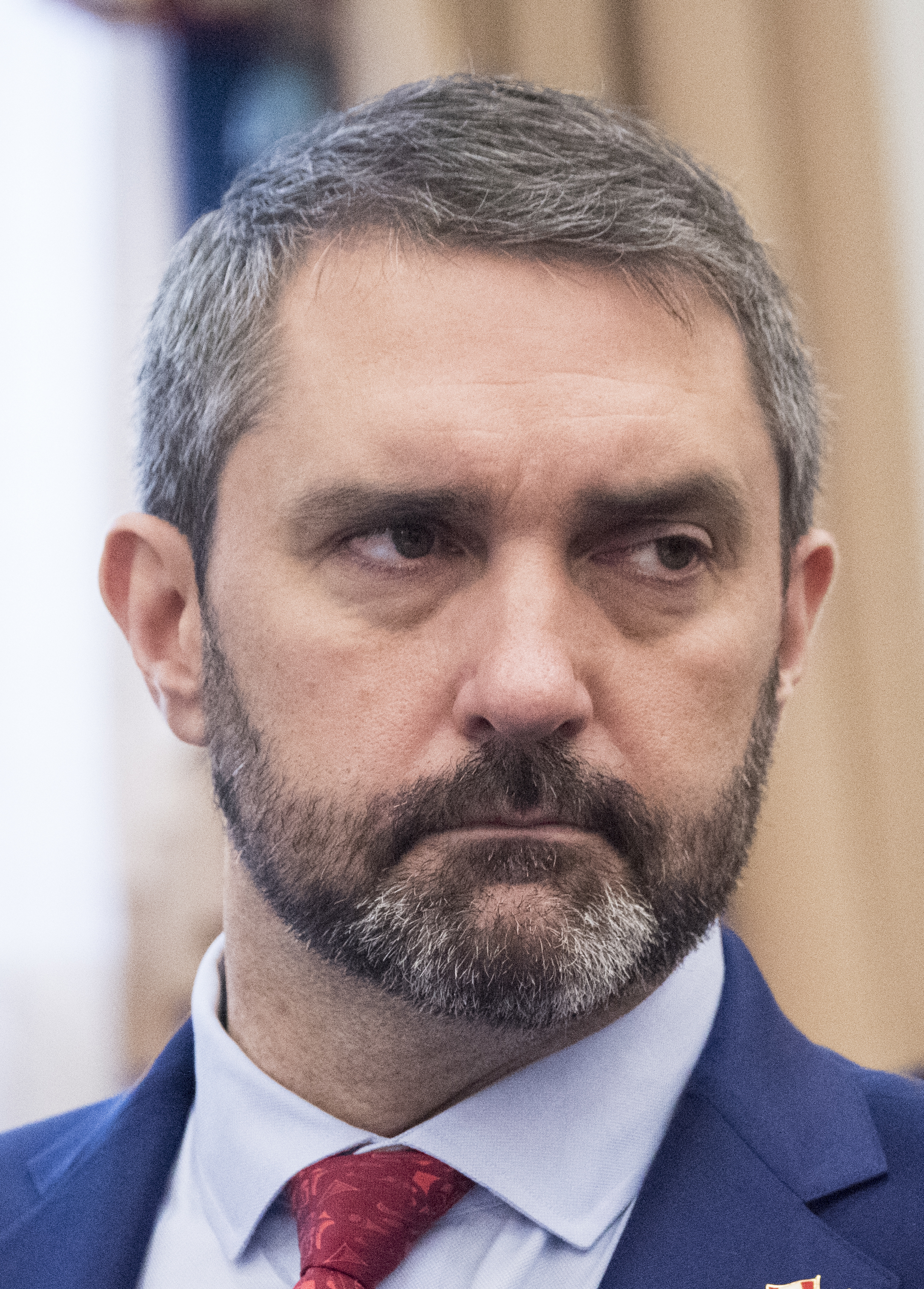
- Silver in 2017

9th Premier of Yukon
- In office December 3, 2016 – January 14, 2023
- Deputy: Ranj Pillai; Tracy-Anne McPhee
- Commissioner: Doug Phillips; Angélique Bernard
- Preceded by: Darrell Pasloski
- Succeeded by: Ranj Pillai

Leader of the Yukon Liberal Party
- In office August 17, 2012 – January 9, 2023
- Preceded by: Darius Elias
- Succeeded by: Ranj Pillai

Member of the Yukon Legislative Assembly for Klondike
- In office October 11, 2011 – October 3, 2025
- Preceded by: Steve Nordick
- Succeeded by: Brent McDonald

Personal details
- Born: Sidney Alexander Silver; October 15, 1969 (age 57) Antigonish, Nova Scotia, Canada
- Party: Liberal
- Occupation: Teacher

Sidney Alexander "Sandy" Silver (born October 15, 1969) is a Canadian politician, who served as the ninth premier of Yukon from 2016 to 2023. He was first elected to the Yukon Legislative Assembly in the 2011 election, and was re-elected in 2016. He represented the electoral district of Klondike and previously served as Leader of the Yukon Liberal Party.

== Political career ==
=== 33rd Assembly ===
Silver was first elected on October 11, 2011, defeating incumbent Yukon Party Cabinet minister Steve Nordick in the rural Yukon riding of Klondike. It was the only gain for the Yukon Liberal Party that election, which saw its caucus reduced to two seats (Silver and Darius Elias) and its leader, Arthur Mitchell defeated.

As a member of the assembly, Sandy Silver sat on the Standing Committee on Public Accounts, the Standing Committee on Appointments to Major Government Board and Committees, and the Members’ Services Board. He also served on the Select Committee on Whistle-blower Protection and the Select Committee Regarding the Risks and Benefits of Hydraulic Fracturing.

On August 17, 2012, Silver became interim leader of the Yukon Liberal Party following the resignation of Darius Elias, who quit the Liberals to sit as an Independent and leaving Silver as the lone Liberal MLA in the legislative assembly. Elias would later cross the floor to sit with the governing Yukon Party.

Silver became the permanent leader of the Yukon Liberal Party by acclamation in February 2014.

=== 34th Assembly ===
Silver led the Liberals to a majority government in the 2016 election, taking his party from his single seat in the legislature to 11 of 19. It was also the party's strongest-ever showing in rural Yukon, where the Liberals took four of eight seats. Silver himself won the most votes and the highest share of support than any other candidate on election night. His party had campaigned on a platform that advocated for economic diversification, environmental protection, and improving First Nations relations.

Silver and his Cabinet was sworn in on December 3, 2016. His seven-member cabinet consisted of four men and three women. Silver himself assumed the portfolios of Minister of Finance and Minister of the Executive Council Office, in addition to Premier. He is currently also a member of the Members' Services Board.

=== 35th Assembly ===
Silver led the Liberals into the 2021 territorial election. The party won 8 seats, an exact tie with the Yukon Party. The Liberals lost the popular vote overall to the Yukon Party. Silver was personally elected in the district of Klondike. Silver announced his intent to form a minority government despite the tie. On April 23, the Liberals were sworn in with a minority government. On April 28, the NDP announced that they had entered into a formal agreement with the Liberals.

On September 9, 2022, Silver announced his intention to resign as premier and party leader, staying on until the party elected a successor. He also announced he would not be running for re-election to his riding of Klondike in the 2025 Yukon general election. He was succeeded by Ranj Pillai. He continued to serve as a minister in the Pillai and Mike Pemberton ministries.

== Personal life ==
Originally from Antigonish, Nova Scotia, Silver lived in Dawson City since 1998, but took up residence back in Nova Scotia as of 2025. Before his election to the Legislative Assembly, he was a high school math teacher at Robert Service School in Dawson. He holds degrees in math and psychology from St. Francis Xavier University and a Bachelor of Education from the University of Maine.

== Electoral record ==
2021 Yukon general election
Party	Candidate	Votes	%	±%
Liberal	Sandy Silver	526	47.23	-11.82
Yukon Party	Charlie Dagostin	364	32.68	+1.30
New Democratic	Chris Clarke	224	20.11	+9.56
Total valid votes		1,114	99.55	
Total rejected ballots		5	0.45	
Turnout		1,119	70.71	
Eligible voters		1,583		
Liberal hold		Swing		-0.07
Source(s) "Unofficial Election Results 2021". Elections Yukon.

=== Yukon general election, 2016 ===
Klondike
Party	Candidate	Votes	%	±%
Liberal	Sandy Silver	687	59.1%	+10.3%
Yukon Party	Brad Whitelaw	365	31.4%	-5.8%
NDP	Jay Farr	111	9.5%	-4.0%
Total		1,163	100.0%	–

=== Yukon general election, 2011 ===
Klondike
Party	Candidate	Votes	%	±%
Liberal	Sandy Silver	530	48.8%	+34.1%
Yukon Party	Steve Nordick	404	37.2%	-7.9%
NDP	Jorn Meir	147	13.5%	-19.6%
Total		1,085	100.0%	–
