= Bill Weigand =

Canadian politician (1928–2021)

Mayor of Whitehorse
- In office November 18, 1991 – October 1994
- Preceded by: Don Branigan
- Succeeded by: Kathy Watson

Personal details
- Born: October 14, 1928 Edmonton, Alberta, Canada
- Died: June 27, 2021 (aged 92) Whitehorse, Yukon, Canada
- Spouse: Jerrine
- Occupation: businessman, real estate agent

William John Weigand (October 14, 1928 – June 27, 2021) was a Canadian politician, who served as mayor of Whitehorse, Yukon from 1991 to 1994.

Weigand was originally from Edmonton, Alberta and came to Whitehorse in 1946, finding work as a civilian firefighter with the Canadian Army. He later owned and managed the Murdoch's Gem Shop franchise in Whitehorse along with Mike Scott, and worked as a real estate agent after earning a real estate certification at the University of British Columbia. He also served as chair of the Yukon Liquor Board and Yukon Utilities Board, as well as the Whitehorse Downtown Business Association and Kiwanis Club.

On November 14, 1991, Weigand was elected to a three-year term as the Mayor of Whitehorse, defeating rival candidates, councilmen Gerry Thick and Art Deer. He received 1605 votes of the 4065 total votes cast, and 711 more than second-place finisher Art Deer. In 2005, Weigand and his wife Jerrine "Jeri" received the Yukon Commissioner's Award for Public Service. Weigand and his wife later moved to British Columbia where they were residing in 2017.

Weigand died in Whitehorse, Yukon on June 27, 2021, at the age of 92.
