= Gordon Robertson Cameron =

Canadian politician and businessman (1921–2010)

Mayor of Whitehorse, Yukon
- In office 1958–1960
- Preceded by: Gordon Armstrong
- Succeeded by: Vic Wylie

Commissioner of Yukon
- In office 1962–1966
- Preceded by: Frederick Collins
- Succeeded by: James Smith

Personal details
- Born: November 12, 1921 Pictou, Nova Scotia
- Died: August 10, 2010 (aged 88)

Gordon Robertson Cameron (November 12, 1921 – August 10, 2010) was a businessman and former political figure in the Yukon, Canada. He served as the commissioner of Yukon from 1962 to 1966.

He was born in Pictou, Nova Scotia and educated in Vancouver. He was an apprentice at the British Yukon Navigation Company and was manager of Klondike Helicopters Limited. Cameron lived in Whitehorse. He was mayor of Whitehorse from 1958 to 1960.
