= David Millar (politician) =

Canadian politician

MLA for Klondike
- In office 1992–1996
- Preceded by: Art Webster
- Succeeded by: Peter Jenkins

Personal details
- Born: December 29, 1955 (age 70) Whitehorse, Yukon
- Party: Yukon Party

David Andrew Millar is a former Canadian politician, who represented the electoral district of Klondike in the Yukon Legislative Assembly from 1992 to 1996.

He was a member of the Yukon Party.
