= Roger Kimmerly =

Canadian politician

MLA for Whitehorse South Centre
- In office 1981–1989
- Preceded by: Jack Hibberd
- Succeeded by: Joyce Hayden

Personal details
- Born: January 27, 1948 (age 78) Ottawa, Ontario, Canada
- Party: New Democrat

Roger Stephen Kimmerly is a former Canadian politician who represented the electoral district of Whitehorse South Centre in the Yukon Legislative Assembly from 1981 to 1989. He was a member of the Yukon New Democratic Party.

== Early career ==
Before entering politics, Kimmerly worked as a lawyer in Ottawa and Yellowknife. He served as a Yukon territorial court judge for three years.

== Political career ==
In July 1981, Kimmerly was nominated by the Yukon New Democratic Party as its candidate for the October by-election for the electoral district of Whitehorse South Centre. The riding had been left vacant following the resignation of Jack Hibberd. Kimmerly won the by-election, which resulted in the New Democrats replacing the Yukon Liberal Party as the Official Opposition in the Legislative Assembly. He was re-elected in the 1982 and 1985 elections. Following the 1985 election, which saw the Yukon New Democratic Party form government for the first time, Kimmerly was appointed Minister of Justice.

He did not run in the 1989 election.

== Personal life ==
Kimmerly had a seven-year relationship with Audrey McLaughlin, who managed two of his political campaigns. He married Carol Smith on the floor of the Yukon legislature in 1986. Following Kimmerly's departure from politics, the couple moved to Duncan, British Columbia to run a 10-acre organic farm.
