= Joyce Hayden =

Canadian politician (1931–2009)

Member of the Yukon Legislative Assembly for Whitehorse South Centre
- In office February 20, 1989 – October 19, 1992
- Preceded by: Roger Kimmerly
- Succeeded by: riding dissolved

Personal details
- Born: September 20, 1931 Glaslyn, Saskatchewan, Canada
- Died: March 7, 2009 (aged 77) Yukon, Canada
- Party: New Democrat
- Occupation: writer

Joyce Sandra Hayden (September 20, 1931 – March 7, 2009) was a Canadian politician, who represented the electoral district of Whitehorse South Centre in the Yukon Legislative Assembly from 1989 to 1992. She was a member of the Yukon New Democratic Party.

== Background ==
Hayden was born in Glaslyn, Saskatchewan and raised in Birch Lake, Saskatchewan. She married Earle Hayden in 1949, and the couple moved to the Yukon in 1953.

As founding president of the Yukon Status of Women Council, she spearheaded a campaign to institute a public transit system in Whitehorse, securing an $80,000 grant from Transport Canada to set up a community system, the Yukon Women's Minibus Society. She was also active in the Girl Guides of Canada and the YWCA.

She had been legally blind since 1983.

== Politics ==
Hayden was elected to the Yukon Legislative Assembly in the 1989 election, succeeding Roger Kimmerly in the district of Whitehorse South Centre. She served as Minister of Health and Social Services in the final cabinet of Tony Penikett. In that role, she briefly faced controversy when two young offenders who had escaped from a youth detention facility turned themselves in to her office, and she spent some time talking to them over lunch before turning them back over to the police.

She did not run in the 1992 election.

== Career after politics ==
Hayden went on to be active in the Yukon Commission on Unity, Hospice Yukon and Whitehorse Northern Women: Different Lives, Common Threads Circumpolar Women's Conference. She also wrote two books on Yukon history, including Yukon's Women of Power. In 2003, she was a recipient of the Governor General's Award in Commemoration of the Person's Case.

She died in 2009.
