= Geraldine Van Bibber =

Canadian politician

Geraldine van Bibber CM

Commissioner of Yukon
- In office December 1, 2005 – December 17, 2010
- Prime Minister: Paul Martin; Stephen Harper
- Premier: Dennis Fentie
- Preceded by: Jack Cable
- Succeeded by: Doug Phillips

Member of the Yukon Legislative Assembly for Porter Creek North
- In office November 7, 2016 – October 3, 2025
- Preceded by: Doug Graham
- Succeeded by: Doris Anderson

Chancellor of Yukon College
- In office December 10, 2012 – September 22, 2016
- Premier: Darrell Pasloski
- Preceded by: Rolfe Hougen
- Succeeded by: Piers McDonald

Personal details
- Born: July 3, 1951 (age 75) Dawson City, Yukon
- Party: Yukon Party
- Spouse: Pat Van Bibber
- Profession: appointed official, businesswoman

Geraldine Van Bibber CM (born July 3, 1951) is a Canadian politician who represented the Yukon electoral district of Porter Creek North as a member of the Yukon Party until 2025. She was elected as part of the 2016 Yukon election.

Van Bibber served as the commissioner of Yukon from 2005 to 2010 and a member of the Gwichʼin First Nation. She has also served as Chancellor of Yukon College and Administrator of the Yukon.

Prior to being appointed to office, Van Bibber worked for the Yukon Department of Finance. She was also instrumental in the formation of the Yukon First Nations Culture and Tourism Association, as a private tour operator.

She was re-elected at the 2021 Yukon general election.

== Political career ==
Van Bibber announced her intention to seek the Yukon Party nomination in its stronghold riding of Porter Creek North in the 2016 Yukon election, which had been vacated after the incumbent Yukon Party representative, Doug Graham, announced his retirement. Although highly unusual for a former Commissioner to run for elected office - given the position's non-partisan nature - she was not the Yukon's first Commissioner to later seek elected office, and was already serving in a partisan role at the time as Senior Advisor to the Premier in the Yukon Party Cabinet Offices. She was elected to the Yukon Legislature for the riding of Porter Creek North on November 7, 2016.

Van Bibber is currently a member of the Standing Committee on Statutory Instruments and the Standing Committee on Appointments to Major Government Boards and Committees. She is also the Yukon Party caucus critic for the Department of Education, the Aboriginal relations branch of the Executive Council Office, and the Department of Tourism and Culture.

Van Bibber served as the Official Opposition critic for Economic Development, Tourism and Culture, the Yukon Energy Corporation, and the Yukon Development Corporation.

On January 28, 2025, Van Bibber announced that she would not run for re-election in the 2025 election and instead serve as Yukon Party campaign chair.

== Honours ==
Van Bibber was appointed a Commander of the Order of St. John in 2006 and was appointed as a member of the Order of Canada - one of Canada's highest civilian honours - in 2016. Her citation into the Order of Canada recognizes her "role in making the territory a travel-destination by coordinating its tourism industry and broadening awareness of its unique Indigenous cultures."

Van Bibber is also a recipient of the Queen's Diamond Jubilee Medal.

== Electoral record ==
=== 2021 general election ===
2021 Yukon general election: Porter Creek North
Party	Candidate	Votes	%	±%
Yukon Party	Geraldine Van Bibber	562	49.16	+5.2%
Liberal	Staci McIntosh	331	28.95	-8.8%
New Democratic	Francis Van Kessel	250	21.87	+7.2%
Total valid votes		1,143		
Total rejected ballots				
Turnout				
Eligible voters				
Yukon Party hold		Swing		-10.11
Source(s) "Unofficial Election Results 2021". Elections Yukon.

=== 2016 general election ===
Porter Creek North
Party	Candidate	Votes	%	±%
Yukon Party	Geraldine Van Bibber	435	44.0%	-5.8%
Liberal	Eileen Melnychuk	372	37.6%	+27.4%
New Democratic	Francis van Kessel	145	14.7%	-16.8%
Green	Mike Ivens	37	3.7%	-4.9%
Total		989	100.0%	
