= Frederick Howard Collins (commissioner) =

Frederick Howard Collins (Yukon Commissioner)

Commissioner of Yukon
- In office June 8, 1955 – May 1, 1962
- Prime Minister: Louis St. Laurent; John Diefenbaker
- Preceded by: Wilfred George Brown
- Succeeded by: Gordon Robertson Cameron

Personal details
- Born: October 1, 1897 Bedford, England
- Died: August 24, 1988 (aged 90) St. Catharines, Ontario
- Spouse(s): Sybil Evelyn Collins, née Dean
- Occupation: farmer, army colonel, civil servant

Frederick Howard Collins (October 1, 1897 – August 24, 1988) was the commissioner of Yukon from 1955 to 1962. He succeeded Wilfred George Brown and was followed in the position by George Robertson Cameron. The Yukon territorial government today resembles those in the Canadian provinces, i.e., parliamentary with a Legislative Assembly and a Premier as head of government. But historically, and during the term of Collins, the federally-appointed Commissioner was the empowered chief executive of the territory.

Collins brought with him to the Yukon a long tenure in the Canadian army. Serving in both world wars, he had risen to the rank of lieutenant colonel. He also came with his experience as a civil servant in the Federal Treasury Board.

Federal census figures reveal that during the Collins years as Commissioner the population of Yukon increased some 20 percent (from 12,190 in 1956 to 14,628 in 1961) and the population of the capital city, Whitehorse, nearly doubled (from 2,570 to 5,031).

These years brought substantial improvements in the territory's infrastructure. A dam and hydro-electric reservoir were constructed near Whitehorse and new all-weather bridges over the Yukon, Pelly, and Stewart rivers replaced ferries, providing year-round surface access via highway between Whitehorse, Mayo, and Dawson. Completing the process of moving the Yukon capital from Dawson to Whitehorse, a new Commissioner's residence was built there and the Riverdale residential subdivision was developed in 1958, attracting scores of government employees.

Important advances also came in social services and education. The most visible legacy of Collins and his tenure as Yukon Commissioner is the F. H. Collins Secondary School in Whitehorse. Ex-Commissioner Collins was present for the ceremonial opening of the school on 11 January 1963 According to the school's website, "during his term in office, (Collins) initiated several changes in the field of education and much improved the standards of the system." In 2016, a new Whitehorse secondary school also named in honor of F.H. Collins opened. It replaced the structure carrying his name which had first opened its doors to students in 1963.

That is not to say that the benefits of educational policies and funding were distributed equitably or without regard to ethnicity. They were not, in the Yukon or elsewhere in the nation. Though it is now extinct and regarded as a historical shame, the then-prevailing system for the education of "native" (First Nations) children across Canada separated them from family and familiar culture and boarded them in federally-funded but denominationally-run "Indian residential schools." In the Yukon specifically, Baptists operated a residential school in Whitehorse during the years Collins served as Commissioner. Another, in Carcross, was run by the Anglican Church

During the Collins tenure as Commissioner, plans were made for the launch of post-secondary teaching and learning in the territory. As a result, in 1963 the Vocational and Technical Training Centre opened in Whitehorse, soon followed by satellite branches in other Yukon communities. Building upon the development of its Yukon Vocational and Technical Training Centre precursor, Yukon College opened in 1983. Plans for the transition of Yukon College to university status have been legislatively-approved and are being implemented. Now bearing the name Yukon University, this institution has become the first in any of Canada's three northern territories to carry official university status.

Collins retired to St. Catharines, Ontario. He died there in 1988.
