= Steve Nordick =

Canadian politician

Minister of Economic Development
- In office May 4, 2011 – October 11, 2011
- Premier: Darrell Pasloski
- Preceded by: Jim Kenyon
- Succeeded by: Currie Dixon

Member of the Yukon Legislative Assembly for Klondike
- In office October 10, 2006 – October 11, 2011
- Preceded by: Peter Jenkins
- Succeeded by: Sandy Silver

Personal details
- Party: Yukon Party

Steve Nordick is a Canadian politician, who represented the rural Yukon electoral district of Klondike in the Yukon Legislative Assembly from 2006 to 2011. He is a member of the Yukon Party.

== Political career ==
Nordick was elected MLA for Klondike in the 2006 Yukon election. He served as Deputy Speaker of the Legislative Assembly from November 2006 until his appointment to Premier Darrell Pasloski's Cabinet in May 2011. He assumed responsibility for the Department of Economic Development, the Yukon Housing Corporation, Yukon Liquor Corporation, and the Yukon Lottery Commission.

Nordick was defeated by Yukon Liberal Sandy Silver in the 2011 Yukon election.

== Personal life ==
Nordick and his wife have owned a bed and breakfast in Dawson City, Yukon since 1999. Before electoral politics, he was an operations manager for a petroleum company, hauled fuel and freight as a long haul truck driver, and drove tour bus for a local company. He is a former member of the Board of Directors of the Klondike Visitor's Association and the Dawson City Chamber of Commerce.

He is originally from Saskatchewan.

== Electoral record ==
=== Yukon general election, 2011 ===
Klondike
Party	Candidate	Votes	%	±%
Liberal	Sandy Silver	530	48.8%	+34.1%
Yukon Party	Steve Nordick	404	37.2%	-7.9%
NDP	Jorn Meir	147	13.5%	-19.6%
Total		1,085	100.0%	–

=== Yukon general election, 2006 ===
Klondike
Party	Candidate	Votes	%	±%
Yukon Party	Steve Nordick	405	45.1%	-9.1%
NDP	Jorn Meier	297	33.1%	+11.8%
Liberal	Steve Taylor	132	14.7%	-9.2%
Independent	Glen Everitt	56	6.2%	+6.2%
Total		898	100.0%	–
