= 1976 in Canadian television =

The following is a list of events affecting Canadian television in 1976. Events listed include television show debuts, finales, cancellations, and channel launches.

== Events ==
Date	Event
July 17	Lloyd Robertson leaves CBC Television's The National to become co-anchor (with Harvey Kirck) and later solo anchor of the CTV National News.
August 1	The 1976 Summer Olympics are broadcast worldwide, from Montreal, Quebec, drawing an estimated one billion viewers.
October 21	The 1976 Canadian Film Awards airs on CTV.

=== Debuts ===
Show	Station	Premiere Date
90 Minutes Live	CBC Television	April 19
Pencil Box	CBC Television	April 19
The New Avengers	CTV	April 19
Let's Go	CTV	September 1
Second City Television	Global	September 21
Bluff	Global	October 6
A Gift to Last	CBC Television	December 19

=== Ending this year ===
Show	Station	Cancelled
This Is the Law	CBC Television	April 6
House of Pride	CBC Television	Unknown
Excuse My French	CTV	Unknown

== Television shows ==
=== 1950s ===
- Country Canada (1954–2007)
- CBC News Magazine (1952–1981)
- Circle 8 Ranch (1955–1978)
- The Friendly Giant (1958–1985)
- Hockey Night in Canada (1952–present)
- The National (1954–present)
- Front Page Challenge (1957–1995)
- Wayne and Shuster Show (1958–1989)

=== 1960s ===
- CTV National News (1961–present)
- Land and Sea (1964–present)
- Man Alive (1967–2000)
- Mr. Dressup (1967–1996)
- The Nature of Things (1960–present, scientific documentary series)
- The Pig and Whistle (1967–1977)
- Question Period (1967–present, news program)
- Reach for the Top (1961–1985)
- Take 30 (1962–1983)
- The Tommy Hunter Show (1965–1992)
- University of the Air (1966–1983)
- W-FIVE (1966–present, newsmagazine program)

=== 1970s ===
- The Beachcombers (1972–1990)
- The Bobby Vinton Show (1975–1978)
- Canada AM (1972–present, news program)
- City Lights (1973–1989)
- Celebrity Cooks (1975–1984)
- Coming Up Rosie (1975–1978)
- Definition (1974–1989)
- the fifth estate (1975–present, newsmagazine program)
- Grand Old Country (1975–1981)
- Headline Hunters (1972–1983)
- Howie Meeker's Hockey School (1973–1977)
- King of Kensington (1975–1980)
- Marketplace (1972–present, newsmagazine program)
- Ombudsman (1974–1980)
- Polka Dot Door (1971-1993)
- Sidestreet (1975–1978)
- This Land (1970–1982)
- V.I.P. (1973–1983)
- The Watson Report (1975–1981)

== TV movies ==
- The Flower Between the Teeth (La fleur aux dents)
- The Insurance Man from Ingersoll
- Kathy Karuks Is a Grizzly Bear
- A Nest of Shadows
- Of the Fields, Lately
- A Thousand Moons
- What We Have Here Is a People Problem

== Television stations ==
=== Debuts ===
Date	Market	Station	Channel	Affiliation	Notes/References
July 16	Windsor, Ontario	CBEFT	78	Radio-Canada (O&O)	Shut down August 1, 2012
July 28	Lloydminster, Alberta-Sask.	CITL-TV	4	CTV	
August 29	Trois-Rivieres, Quebec	CHEM-TV	8	TVA	
September 1	Vancouver, British Columbia	CKVU-TV	21	Independent	
September 27	Vancouver, British Columbia	CBUFT	26	Radio-Canada (O&O)	
September 27	Regina, Saskatchewan	CBKFT	13	Radio-Canada (O&O)	

== Births ==
Date	Name	Notability
June 6	Emilie-Claire Barlow	Actress (Sailor Moon, Total Drama)
November 7	Melyssa Ade	Retired actress
November 26	Demore Barnes	Actor

== See also ==
- 1976 in Canada
- List of Canadian films
