= Adeline Webber =

Commissioner of Yukon

The Honourable Adeline Webber OY
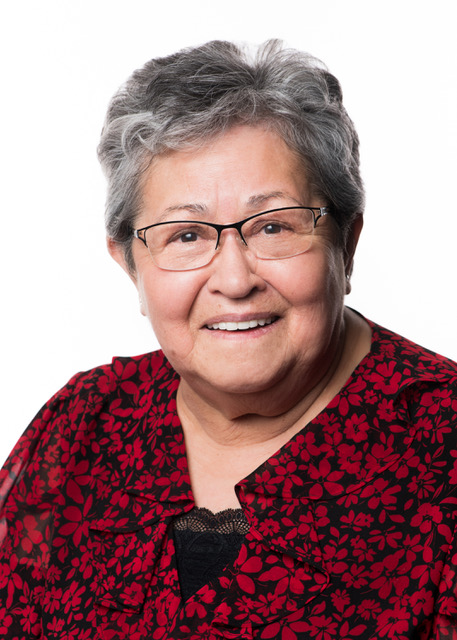

Commissioner of Yukon
- Incumbent
- Assumed office May 31, 2023
- Prime Minister: Justin Trudeau; Mark Carney
- Premier: Ranj Pillai; Mike Pemberton; Currie Dixon
- Preceded by: Angélique Bernard

Personal details
- Born: Adeline Kh'ayàdê Webber Whitehorse, Yukon, Canada
- Website: commissionerofyukon.ca

Adeline Kh'ayàdê Webber OY is a Canadian politician, currently serving as the commissioner of Yukon, since May 31, 2023. She is a member of the Teslin Tlingit First Nation and Kukhhittan Clan.

Webber has worked in the federal public service and has been extensively involved with land claims, First Nation self-government agreements, and Indigenous women’s rights in the territory. As the founder and former President of the Whitehorse Aboriginal Women’s Circle and as the Yukon District Director for the Public Service Commission of Canada, Webber's continued work in employment and training for First Nations people has been implemented through several women’s leadership-training courses, as well as the Northern Careers Program.

== Early life ==
Born and raised in Whitehorse, Yukon, Adeline Webber is of Inland Tlingit ancestry. At the age of five years old, Webber was taken from her home and placed at the Whitehorse Baptism Mission School (1947–1960). Although Webber and her sister, Winnie Peterson, stayed together, the residential school system separated her family members, sending her brothers to schools in Northern Alberta and Carcross. Following seven years in residential school, Webber married her husband Bill Webber before landing her first job working in the kitchen and doing laundry in Yukon Hall, the residential school residence that later housed the Council of Yukon First Nations offices for more than ten years.

== Career ==
Adeline Webber's career spans over 30 years of lobbying for Indigenous rights in the Yukon. She founded the Yukon Indian Women's Association in 1974 as a means to address the inequality Indigenous women faced in the territory. Today, the Whitehorse Aboriginal Women’s Circle (WAWC) exists as "a forum for Aboriginal women to socialize, network, support and address issues of common interest and concern." Webber later joined the Federal public service as the Yukon District Director for the Public Service Commission of Canada In this role, Webber developed the Northern Careers Program, which aimed to educate and assist all First Nations people with seeking employment opportunities in government at the federal level. This program continues to see its impact as many participants work in senior government positions today. She also developed a Training Policy Committee and Training Trust program which set aside and distributed monies so that First Nations people could be trained. Webber's work in human resources was also realized in the form of a human resource plan for both territorial and federal governments, which was developed in consultation with the Yukon Government and First Nations.

Webber was a force when it came to implementing land claims and First Nation self-government agreements in the territory. As a leader in the Teslin Tlingit Council community, Webber has advocated for the finalization of the Teslin Tlingit Council Final and Self-Government Agreements, falling under the negotiation framework of the Umbrella Final Agreement. She is an honorary lifetime member of the Skookum Jim Friendship Centre due to her contributions as a board of directors in 1989 and president for ten years. She continues to be an active member of her community.

In 2018, Webber was appointed Administrator of Yukon Territory, in the role she acted in the place of the Commissioner of Yukon Territory if they were unable to fulfill their duties during an absence. Prime Minister Justin Trudeau stated of Webber on March 9, 2018: “Adeline Webber has dedicated much of her career to public service and has proven herself to be a champion of Indigenous Peoples. I know that the territory will benefit greatly from the experience and knowledge she will bring to the table as the Administrator of Yukon.”

In 2023, Webber was appointed the 37th Commissioner of Yukon by Prime Minister Justin Trudeau for a five-year term, succeeding Angélique Bernard.

== Publications ==
The book Finding our Faces consists of over sixty pages of photos and stories documenting the residential school system in Whitehorse. Working with archivist Melissa Carlick, Webber sought funding from the Anglican Church Fund and Yukon Government to develop this record of the Whitehorse Baptist Mission School. Webber has said that this project documents "my history for my children and grandchildren," and ultimately may be used as a resource for schools to learn of formerly undocumented history.

== Honours and awards ==
Ribbon Bar of Adeline Webber

Ribbon	Description	Post-nominal letters	Notes
	Order of St John	DStJ	
	Order of Yukon	OY	
	125th Anniversary of the Confederation of Canada Medal		
	Queen Elizabeth II Golden Jubilee Medal		Canadian version
	King Charles III Coronation Medal		Canadian version

Webber is also a recipient of the Yukon Commissioner’s Award for Public Service and the Skookum Jim Friendship Centre Service Award.
