= Ernie Bourassa =

Canadian politician

Mayor of Whitehorse, Yukon
- In office 2000–2006
- Preceded by: Kathy Watson
- Succeeded by: Bev Buckway

Personal details
- Born: 1954 (age 71–72) Whitehorse, Yukon, Canada
- Occupation: Insurance broker Realtor

Ernie Bourassa (born 1954) is a former Canadian politician who served as mayor of Whitehorse, Yukon from 2000 to 2006.

== Early life and career ==
Bourassa was born in Whitehorse, Yukon in 1954. In 1970, he represented the Yukon at the Arctic Winter Games in Yellowknife in hockey. The following year, he played volleyball at the 1971 Canada Winter Games in Saskatoon. He graduated from F.H. Collins Secondary School in 1972. He attended Royal Roads Military College and Simon Fraser University before graduating from the University of British Columbia with a Bachelor of Commerce in 1980.

After graduating, he returned to Whitehorse where we worked briefly at the Yukon Department of Finance. He left his position in 1981 and became an insurance broker with Reed Stenhouse Ltd. He was promoted to branch manager in 1986. He left the company in 1990 and purchased the majority of Bailey-Richardson Insurance Brokers Ltd., which was renamed Bourassa Richardson Insurance Ltd. He also served as the vice president of the Whitehorse Chamber of Commerce in the early 1990s.

== Mayor of Whitehorse ==
On August 22, 2000, Bourassa declared his intention to run the 2000 Whitehorse mayoral race. His campaign focused primarily on improving the city's waterfront. He was elected on October 19. He was re-elected in 2003. His tenure saw the city awarded the 2007 Canada Winter Games, the first Canada Games to be held North of 60, and the construction of a $28.8 million multiplex sports facilities, as well as a smoking ban in public places within the city.

Bourassa ran for a third term in the 2006 municipal election but was defeated by Bev Buckway.

== Later career ==
Bourassa served as executive vice president of the 2007 Canada Winter Games. In January 2007, he was appointed as president and CEO of the Yukon Chamber of Commerce. Later that year, he left the position and moved to Kelowna, British Columbia where he began working as a real estate agent. However, the Okanagan real estate market declined during the 2008 financial crisis and, in 2009, he returned to Whitehorse in 2009 as a realtor with RE/MAX.

== Awards and recognition ==
In 2012, Bourassa received the Queen Elizabeth II Diamond Jubilee Medal for his contributions to the 2007 Canada Winter Games.
