= Wilfred George Brown =

Canadian politician

Commissioner of Yukon
- In office November 5, 1952 – June 8, 1955
- Prime Minister: Louis St. Laurent
- Preceded by: Frederick Fraser
- Succeeded by: Frederick Howard Collins

Personal details
- Born: March 1906 Moosomin, Saskatchewan
- Died: August 23, 1970 (aged 64) Toronto, Ontario
- Resting place: Mount Pleasant Cemetery, Toronto
- Citizenship: Canadian
- Occupation: Lawyer

Wilfred George Brown (March 1906 – August 23, 1970) was the commissioner of Yukon from 1952 to 1955.

Brown was born in Moosomin, Saskatchewan, in 1906. His father was James Thomas Brown, Chief Justice of the Saskatchewan supreme court for thirty-nine years. Brown attended the University of Saskatchewan, studying law. He later practised law in Regina and served in World War II. W.G. Brown was a district administrator in the Northwest Territory before being appointed Yukon Commissioner. Brown succeeded Frederick Fraser as Yukon Commissioner in November 1952. In 1953 he agreed to a motion passed by the territorial council that reinstated the position of territorial secretary, with W.D. Robertson being given the post. In 1953 Brown legally designated McLean Lake and all land within .5 miles (0.80 km) from its shore as a game sanctuary, the only game sanctuary that the Yukon government created without prompting. In 1955 Brown was replaced by Frederick Howard Collins.

On 13 June 1957 Brown, then chief of the territorial division of the Department of Northern Affairs and National Resources, was made deputy commissioner of the Northwest Territories council.

The W.G. Brown Building/Astro Hill Complex is a two-building structure in Iqaluit, Nunavut, and at eight floors is the largest and among the tallest buildings in the city.

Brown died August 23, 1970, in Toronto after a series of strokes. He was buried August 26 in Mount Pleasant Cemetery, Toronto.

== Sources ==
- "Astro Hill Complex".
- Michael, Janet Moodie (June 1987). "From Sissons to Meyer: The Administrative Development of The Yukon Government 1948-1979" (PDF).
- Moodie, Sue (February 10, 2006). "Wildlife has prior claim on McLean Lake". Yukon News.
- "New Post". Ottawa Citizen. 4 July 1957.
- "Yukon History 1950s". Hougen Group.
