= Angélique Bernard =

Canadian politician

Angélique Bernard GCStJ OY FRHSC

Commissioner of Yukon
- In office March 12, 2018 – May 31, 2023
- Prime Minister: Justin Trudeau
- Premier: Sandy Silver; Ranj Pillai
- Preceded by: Doug Phillips
- Succeeded by: Adeline Webber

Personal details
- Born: 1972 (age 53–54) Brossard, Quebec, Canada
- Children: 2
- Profession: Translator

Rose Marie Angélique Bernard (born 1972) is the former commissioner of Yukon, appointed on 12 March 2018. She was the youngest person to serve as commissioner for any of Canada's three northern territories and the first Franco-Yukonnais to serve as commissioner.

Bernard moved to the Yukon from Montreal in 1995, initially for a 4-month translation internship with the territorial government. She became an active member of the Franco-Yukonnais community, including volunteering for non-profit organizations and hosting a French-language community radio show starting in 1998. She served as Chair of the Association Franco-Yukonnaise from 2010 to 2017. Since leaving the office of commissioner of the Yukon, Bernard has published a book detailing the role of commissioner and her own experience.

== Honours and arms ==
=== Honours ===
==== Federal honours ====
- Dame of Justice of the Order of Saint John — 7 June 2019

==== Territorial orders ====
- Member of the Order of Yukon — 22 March 2020 (ex officio)

=== Arms ===
Coat of arms of Angélique Bernard
Notes Granted 15 May 2019 Crest A raven Proper its dexter claw resting on a sextant Or and perched on a soccer ball issuant from a circlet of blue flags and crocuses Proper. Escutcheon Purpure three fountain pens palewise their nibs in base in chief and in base entravaillé within five barrulets Or. Supporters Dexter a black bear proper charged on the shoulder with a plate bearing a wolf’s head contourné Sable sinister a grizzly bear Proper charged on the shoulder with a plate bearing a raven’s head the Supporters standing on a snowy base set with fireweed Proper. Motto S'ouvrir à toutes les possibilités (French for 'Be open to all possibilities')
