= Whitehorse Riverdale =

Former territorial electoral district in the Yukon, Canada

Whitehorse Riverdale was a territorial electoral district in the Canadian territory of Yukon, which was represented on the Yukon Territorial Council from 1974 to 1978. The district consisted primarily of the Riverdale area in the capital city of Whitehorse.

It was one of four districts, alongside Ogilvie, Pelly River and Whitehorse Porter Creek, which existed only for the 1974 Yukon general election; the district was newly created in 1974 when the territorial council was expanded from seven to 12 members, but was further split into the districts of Riverdale North and Riverdale South when the new Legislative Assembly of Yukon was established in 1978.

The district elected Willard Phelps in the 1974 election, but Don Branigan filed for a court injunction to overturn his election on the grounds that as the government was renting space in Phelps' commercial real estate holdings for some of its liquor stores, his serving on the council placed him in a conflict of interest. Phelps was removed from office in 1975; Branigan ran in the resulting by-election, but lost to Walt Lengerke.

== Representatives ==
Name	Took office	Left office
Willard Phelps	1974	1975
Walt Lengerke	1975	1978

== See also ==
- List of Yukon territorial electoral districts
- Canadian provincial electoral districts
