= Meg McCall =

Canadian politician

MLA for Klondike
- In office 1978–1982
- Preceded by: first member
- Succeeded by: Clarke Ashley

Personal details
- Born: May 24, 1931 Mayo, Yukon
- Died: September 10, 1997 (aged 66) British Columbia, Canada
- Party: Progressive Conservative

Margaret "Meg" Sutherland McCall was a Canadian politician, who represented the electoral district of Klondike in the Yukon Legislative Assembly from 1978 to 1982. She was a member of the Yukon Progressive Conservative Party.

She defeated Yukon New Democratic Party leader Fred Berger and independent candidate Eleanor Millard in the 1978 territorial election. She died of cancer in 1997.
