= List of mayors of Whitehorse =

Mayor of Whitehorse
- Incumbent; Kirk Cameron since 2024
- Term length: 3 years
- Formation: 1950
- First holder: Gordon Armstrong

This is a list of mayors of Whitehorse, the capital of the Canadian territory of Yukon. Whitehorse has had an elected mayor and council since its incorporation as a city in 1950; prior to that, Whitehorse existed as an unincorporated settlement with no local municipal government.

The mayor presides over Whitehorse City Council.

== Mayors ==
No.	Name	In office	
1	Gordon Armstrong	1950	1958
2	Gordon Cameron	1958	1960
3	Vic Wylie	1960	1962
4	Ed Jacobs	1962	1966
5	Howard Firth	1966	1968
6	Bert Wybrew (Note: Governance of the city was temporarily transferred to a taxpayer advisory committee led by Joseph Oliver for part of 1973, after five of the city's six councillors resigned on July 9, 1973 in protest against a jurisdictional dispute with the Yukon Territorial Council, leaving the council without a quorum to conduct city business; Wybrew was also dismissed as mayor during this committee governance period. Following a by-election on September 20, 1973, Wybrew returned to office and served until December.)	1968	1973
7	Paul Lucier	1974	1976
8	Ione Christensen	1976	1978
—	Art Deer (interim)	1978	1979
9	Don Branigan	1979	1979
10	Flo Whyard	1979	1984
(9)	Don Branigan	1984	1991
11	Bill Weigand	1991	1994
12	Kathy Watson	1994	2000
13	Ernie Bourassa	2000	2006
14	Bev Buckway	2006	2012
15	Dan Curtis	2012	2021
16	Laura Cabott	2021	2024
17	Kirk Cameron	2024	incumbent

== Election results ==
=== 2024 ===
Mayoral Candidate	Vote	%
Kirk Cameron	3,116	52.20
Dan Bushnell	2,206	36.96
Stephen Kwok	381	6.38
Jack Bogaard	195	3.27
Dino Rudniski	71	1.19

=== 2021 ===
Mayoral Candidate	Vote	%
Laura Cabott	2,897	43.00
Patti Balsillie	1,942	28.83
Samson Hartland	1,898	28.17

=== 2018 ===
Mayoral Candidate	Vote	%
Dan Curtis	2,933	44.02
Rick Karp	1,908	28.64
Colin Laforme	1,511	22.68
Wilf Carter	163	2.45
Kelly Suits	148	2.22

=== 2015 ===
Mayoral Candidate	Vote	%
Dan Curtis	4,640	78.48
Wilf Carter	835	14.12
Mandeep Sidhu	437	7.39
