= Eleanor Millard =

Canadian writer and politician (born 1942)

- Born: March 4, 1942 (age 84); North Vancouver, British Columbia, Canada
- Education: University of British Columbia
- Occupations: writer and former politician

Eleanor Millard (born March 4, 1942) is a Canadian writer and former politician.

== Biography ==
Born in North Vancouver, British Columbia, Millard graduated from the University of British Columbia in 1965. After graduation, Millard moved to the Yukon, where she worked as a barmaid at a hotel in Dawson City before finding a permanent job as a social worker.

She was elected to the Yukon Territorial Council in the 1974 election, representing the district of Ogilvie, and served as Minister responsible for Education, Recreation, Manpower and Housing in her final months in office.

In the 1978 election, which was the first partisan election to the new Yukon Legislative Assembly, she ran for reelection as an independent candidate in the district of Klondike, losing to Meg McCall of the Yukon Progressive Conservative Party.

She has since published three books as a writer, the short story collection River Child, the memoir Journeys Outside and In and the novel Summer Snow. She also leads the Grandparents' Rights Association of the Yukon, an organization which advocates for kinship care rights in the territory, where for various demographic reasons the number of children being raised by their grandparents instead of their biological parents is fully three times higher than the norm elsewhere in Canada.
