= Eagle Plains =

Eagle Plains is a rural locality in northern Yukon, Canada about 20 km (12 mi) south of the Arctic Circle. The community is along the Dempster Highway, about 410 km (250 mi) north of Dawson City and about 365 km (227 mi) south of Inuvik of the Northwest Territories. With a population of 8, Eagle Plains is also one of the smallest communities in the Yukon. The locality is one of the most isolated communities in Canada with the nearest major city being Edmonton, which is about 2,900 km (1,800 mi) away.

== Geography ==
The region is generally high in elevation and sits on top of permafrost, so the only plant life found in the plains are mosses, lichens, and small shrubs due to the tree line. The region is found between the Ogilvie and Richardson mountain range, where snowmelt creates many creeks and rivers throughout the region.

Being only 20 km (12 mi) south of the Arctic Circle, the locality experiences approximately 10 minutes of civil twilight during the summer solstice.

The community of Eagle Plains is a few kilometers away from the Eagle River, which the locality was named after.

== Tourism and culture ==
Eagle Plains has a hotel and is the only place in between Tombstone Territorial Park and Fort McPherson that offers services like hospitality and gas. It is frequented by travellers headed for Inuvik or Tuktoyaktuk.

The locality also has indigenous centres on site for nearby indigenous tribes.

Eagle Plains serves as the terminus of a temporary winter road which is sometimes built to transport freight into the community of Old Crow, which is normally only accessible by air.
