= Klondike (electoral district) =

Territorial electoral district in the Yukon, Canada

Yukon electoral district
- Interactive map of riding boundaries

Territorial electoral district
- Legislature: Yukon Legislative Assembly
MLA
Brent McDonald
New Democratic
- District created: 1905
- First contested: 1917
- Last contested: 2025

Demographics
- Electors (2021): 1,583
- Census subdivision(s): Dawson City, Eagle Plains, Moosehide Creek 2, Yukon, Unorganized

Klondike is a territorial electoral district of Yukon that has been represented in the Yukon Legislative Assembly since 1917.

As one of Yukon's eight rural ridings, it is the oldest riding in Yukon, first established in 1905. The district includes Dawson City and its environs, as well as Eagle Plains. Klondike was the only seat won by the Yukon Party in the 2000 general election and the only seat held by the Yukon Liberals prior to the 2016 election.

From 2011 to 2025, the district was represented by Sandy Silver, former Premier of Yukon and leader of the Yukon Liberal Party.

== Geography ==
As of the 2025 Yukon general election, Klondike comprises Dawson City and surrounding areas in the central Yukon. The district includes the Klondike River region and extends north to Eagle Plains along the Dempster Highway. It is bordered by the districts of Vuntut Gwitchin to the north and Mayo-Tatchun to the south.

== Members of the Territorial Council / Legislative Assembly ==
Assembly	Years	Member	Party
23rd	1974–1978	Fred Berger	Independent
24th	1978–1982	Meg McCall	Progressive Conservative
25th	1982–1985	Clarke Ashley	Progressive Conservative
26th	1985–1989	Art Webster	New Democratic
27th	1989–1992	Art Webster	New Democratic
28th	1992–1996	David Millar	Yukon Party
29th	1996–2000	Peter Jenkins	Yukon Party
30th	2000–2002	Peter Jenkins	Yukon Party
31st	2002–2005	Peter Jenkins	Yukon Party
31st	2005–2006	Peter Jenkins	Independent
32nd	2006–2011	Steve Nordick	Yukon Party
33rd	2011–2016	Sandy Silver	Liberal
34th	2016–2021	Sandy Silver	Liberal
35th	2021–2025	Sandy Silver	Liberal
36th	2025–present	Brent McDonald	New Democratic

== Election results ==
=== 2025 ===
2025 Yukon general election
** Preliminary results — Not yet official **
Party	Candidate	Votes	%	±%
New Democratic	Brent McDonald	482	52.05	+31.94
Yukon Party	Richard Nagano	444	47.95	+15.27
Total valid votes		926		
Total rejected ballots				
Turnout				
Eligible voters				
Source(s) "Unofficial Election Results 2025". Elections Yukon.

=== 2021 ===
2021 Yukon general election
Party	Candidate	Votes	%	±%
Liberal	Sandy Silver	526	47.23	-11.82
Yukon Party	Charlie Dagostin	364	32.68	+1.30
New Democratic	Chris Clarke	224	20.11	+9.56
Total valid votes		1,114	99.55	
Total rejected ballots		5	0.45	
Turnout		1,119	70.71	
Eligible voters		1,583		
Liberal hold		Swing		-0.07
Source(s) "Unofficial Election Results 2021". Elections Yukon.

=== 2016 ===
2016 Yukon general election
Party	Candidate	Votes	%	±%
Liberal	Sandy Silver	687	59.1%	+10.3%
Yukon Party	Brad Whitelaw	365	31.4%	-5.8%
NDP	Jay Farr	111	9.5%	-4.0%
Total		1163	100.0%	–

=== 2011 ===
2011 Yukon general election
Party	Candidate	Votes	%	±%
Liberal	Sandy Silver	530	48.8%	+34.1%
Yukon Party	Steve Nordick	404	37.2%	-7.9%
NDP	Jorn Meir	147	13.5%	-19.6%
Total		1085	100.0%	–

=== 2006 ===
2006 Yukon general election
Party	Candidate	Votes	%	±%
Yukon Party	Steve Nordick	405	45.1%	-9.1%
NDP	Jorn Meier	297	33.1%	+11.8%
Liberal	Steve Taylor	132	14.7%	-9.2%
Independent	Glen Everitt	56	6.2%	+6.2%
Total		898	100.0%	–

=== 2002 ===
2002 Yukon general election
Party	Candidate	Votes	%	±%
Yukon Party	Peter Jenkins	508	54.2%	+14.8%
Liberal	Glen Everitt	224	22.9%	-14.0%
NDP	Lisa Hutton	200	21.3%	-1.9%
Total		937	100.0%	–

=== 2000 ===
2000 Yukon general election
Party	Candidate	Votes	%	±%
Yukon Party	Peter Jenkins	424	39.4%	-15.5%
Liberal	Stuart Schmidt	397	36.9%	+28.2%
NDP	Aedes Scheer	249	23.2%	-10.7%
Total		1075	100.0%	–

=== 1996 ===
1996 Yukon general election
Party	Candidate	Votes	%	±%
Yukon Party	Peter Jenkins	603	54.9%	+2.0%
NDP	Tim Gerberding	372	33.9%	-12.0%
Liberal	Glen Everitt	96	8.8%	+8.8%
Independent	John Cramp	21	1.9%	+1.9%
Total		1099	100.0%	–

=== 1992 ===
1992 Yukon general election
Party	Candidate	Votes	%	±%
Yukon Party	David Millar	409	52.9%	–
NDP	Art Webster	355	45.9%	–
Total		773	100.0%	–

- The Yukon Progressive Conservative Party re-branded itself the Yukon Party before the 1992 election.

=== 1978 ===
1978 Yukon general election
Party	Candidate	Votes	%	±%
Progressive Conservative	Meg McCall	152	38.3%	–
NDP	Fred Berger	130	32.8%	
Independent	Eleanor Millard	114	28.7%	
Total				

- Partisan politics introduced into the territory.

=== 1922 ===
1922 Yukon general election
Party	Candidate	Votes	%	±%
Independent	John Ferrell	Acclaimed		

=== 1920 ===
1920 Yukon general election
Party	Candidate	Votes	%	±%
Independent	Paul S. Hogan	254	53.4%	–
Independent	Allan McMillan	221	46.5%	–
Total		475	100%	–

=== 1917 ===
1917 Yukon general election
Party	Candidate	Votes	%	±%
Independent	William Lowden	–	–	–
Independent	Joseph McIntosh	–	–	–
Independent	John Pickering	–	–	–
Independent	James Wilson	–	–	–
Total		–	–	–

Top two candidates declared elected.

== See also ==
- List of Yukon territorial electoral districts
- Canadian provincial electoral districts
