= John Edward Gibben =

John Edward Gibben (June 10, 1885 – January 28, 1958) was a lawyer, judge and political figure in the Yukon, Canada. He served as comptroller of Yukon from 1947 to 1950.

He was born in Middlesbrough, England, the son of William Gibben and Eleanor Burman. He came to Canada with his family in 1896 and was educated at the University of Manitoba. Gibben served during World War I. He articled in law with Charles Patrick Wilson and Hugh Amos Robson and was called to the Manitoba bar in 1921. In 1938, Gibben married Ida B. Hume. He served as stipendiary magistrate for the Northwest Territories from 1938 to 1941 and for the Yukon from 1941 to 1947. Gibben was also a prominent freemason. In 1950, he was named judge in the Yukon Territorial Court and served until 1958.
