= Bobbi Jo Steadward =

Canadian field hockey player

Medal record

Women's Field hockey

Representing Canada

Bobbi Jo Hjertaas (née Steadward; born May 13, 1976) is a former field hockey defender from Canada. Born in Edmonton, Alberta, Canada, she earned a total number of 49 international caps for the Canadian National Team during her career. She won a bronze medal, at the 1999 Pan American Games.

== International senior tournaments ==
- 1998 – Commonwealth Games, Kuala Lumpur, Malaysia (not ranked)
- 1999 – Pan American Games, Winnipeg, Manitoba, Canada (3rd)
