= Frederick Fraser (politician) =

Canadian politician

Commissioner of Yukon
- In office October 15, 1951 – November 5, 1952
- Prime Minister: Louis St. Laurent
- Preceded by: Andrew Harold Gibson
- Succeeded by: Wilfred George Brown

Personal details
- Born: October 20, 1895 Revelstoke, British Columbia
- Died: October 18, 1990 (aged 94) Vancouver, British Columbia
- Citizenship: Canadian
- Occupation: lawyer, miner
- Profession: politician

Frederick Fraser (October 20, 1895 – October 18, 1990) was a politician in the Yukon. He served as the commissioner of Yukon from 1951 to 1952.

He was born in Revelstoke, British Columbia and educated in the Vancouver area. Fraser served with the 72nd Battalion and then the Royal Flying Corps during World War I. He studied law and was called to the British Columbia bar in 1919. Fraser practised law until 1929 when he began work with the Hudson Bay Mining and Smelting Company in Manitoba. He served in the Royal Canadian Air Force during World War II. Fraser then served as the first stipendiary magistrate for the Northwest Territories. From 1949 to 1951, he lived in Ottawa, where he was assistant chief in the federal Department of Northern Affairs and Natural Resources. After his term as Yukon Commissioner ended in 1952, he returned to Ottawa where he served as chief of the territorial division in the Northern Affairs and Natural Resources department. In 1955, Fraser retired to Victoria.

He died in Victoria at the age of 94.
