= Whitehorse Porter Creek =

Former territorial electoral district in the Yukon, Canada

Whitehorse Porter Creek was a territorial electoral district in the Canadian territory of Yukon, which was represented on the Yukon Territorial Council from 1974 to 1978. The district consisted primarily of the Porter Creek area in the capital city of Whitehorse.

It was one of four districts, alongside Ogilvie, Pelly River and Whitehorse Riverdale, which existed only for the 1974 Yukon general election; the districts were newly created in 1974 when the territorial council was expanded from seven to 12 members, but was further split into the districts of Whitehorse Porter Creek East and Whitehorse Porter Creek West when the new Legislative Assembly of Yukon was established in 1978.

The district's sole elected representative was Daniel Lang, who continued to represent Whitehorse Porter Creek East after the redistricting.

== See also ==
- List of Yukon territorial electoral districts
- Canadian provincial electoral districts
