= Douglas Bell (politician) =

Canadian politician (1926–2021)

Douglas Bell CM OY

Commissioner of the Yukon
- In office October 9, 1979 – March 27, 1986
- Prime Minister: Joe Clark; Pierre Trudeau; John Turner; Brian Mulroney
- Premier: Chris Pearson; Willard Phelps; Tony Penikett
- Preceded by: Ione Christensen
- Succeeded by: John Kenneth McKinnon

Personal details
- Born: June 15, 1926 Moose Jaw, Saskatchewan, Canada
- Died: April 18, 2021 (aged 94) Whitehorse, Yukon, Canada

Douglas Leslie Dewey Bell, CM OY (June 15, 1926 – April 18, 2021) was a Canadian politician who served as the commissioner of Yukon. He was made a Member of the Order of Canada in 1989 and a member of the Order of Yukon in 2019. Bell died at the age of 94 in 2021 after a period of declining health.
