= Pelly River (electoral district) =

Former territorial electoral district in the Yukon, Canada

Pelly River was a territorial electoral district in the Canadian territory of Yukon, which was represented on the Yukon Territorial Council from 1974 to 1978. The district consisted primarily of town of Faro, as well as much of the rural northeast quadrant of Yukon.

It was one of four districts, alongside Ogilvie, Whitehorse Porter Creek and Whitehorse Riverdale, which existed only for the 1974 Yukon general election; the districts were newly created in 1974 when the territorial council was expanded from seven to 12 members, but Pelly River was divided into the districts of Faro and Campbell when the new Legislative Assembly of Yukon was established in 1978.

The district's sole elected representative was Stuart McCall, who was defeated when he ran for reelection to the Legislative Assembly in Faro in 1978.

== See also ==
- List of Yukon territorial electoral districts
- Canadian provincial electoral districts
