= Murder of Rebecca Middleton =

1996 murder of a Canadian teenager in Bermuda

Rebecca Jane Middleton (June 27, 1979 – July 3, 1996) was a Canadian teenager who was raped and murdered while on vacation in Bermuda. She was stabbed over 30 times, although alive when found, she bled to death before paramedics arrived.

Due to numerous errors in the prosecution of the perpetrators and double jeopardy, no one was charged with the murder. Due to the heinous nature of the crime, the lack of prosecution and the persistence of the Middleton family in seeking justice, it became a high-profile case and attracted the attention of Cherie Booth (the former UK Prime Minister's wife).

== Background ==
Rebecca "Becky" Jane Middleton was born on June 27, 1979, to Cindy and Dave Middleton in Belleville, Ontario. Rebecca was described by her family as a "tomboy". She played softball in her local community league and enjoyed sailing, skiing and playing piano. She was the youngest of two older brothers and an older sister to two step-siblings through her mother's second marriage.

On June 20, 1996, shortly before her 17th birthday, Rebecca set out on summer vacation to St. George's, Bermuda, accompanied by her friend Jasmine. The two girls planned to stay with Jasmine's father, Rick Meens, in Flatts for the duration of their visit. The two girls had originally hoped to make the trip in 1995, but were unable to convince Rebecca's parents at the time.

Following their arrival in Bermuda, the girls toured the nearby capital of Hamilton and went sightseeing in the local area of St. George's. On June 25, Rebecca and Jasmine went to the White Horse Tavern in St. George's to drink and socialize. There they met fellow teenagers Russell McCann, Ben Turtle, and Johnathan Cassidy who were vacationing from the UK. On June 26, the group of teens coincidentally met again at a different club in Hamilton and made plans to party again on Hawkins Island on July 2. On June 27, the Meens family hosted a 17th birthday celebration for Rebecca. That evening she wrote letters for each of her parents which she hoped to mail to them at a later date, however, none of these letter would ultimately be sent.

== Murder ==
On July 2, 1996, due to unexpected weather, the group of teenagers were forced to change their original plan of taking a boat ride to Hawkins Island and instead agreed to meet again at the White Horse Tavern. Rick Meens and his wife drove Rebecca and Jasmine to St. George's around 7:00 p.m and at around 7:30 p.m. the girls met up with McCann, Turtle and Cassidy at the White Horse Tavern. The teenagers partied and drank until the bar closed and then moved the party to Johnathan Cassidy's house nearby.

At 1:08 a.m. on July 3, 1996, Jasmine called a taxi to take her and Rebecca home, but no taxi arrived to pick them up. Jasmine called for a taxi again at 1:45 a.m. and 2:16 a.m. but no taxi arrived despite the assurances of the dispatcher. The other occupants of the house had all gone to bed around the time of the third call to the taxi service. The girls stood at the end of the driveway and tried multiple times to unsuccessfully hail passing taxis.

At around 3:00 a.m. a young man on a motorbike, later identified as Dean Lottimore, approached the girls asking for a cigarette. Lottimore was joined shortly afterwards by two more men on a second motorbike, who were later identified as Justis Smith, 17, and Kirk Mundy, 21. The men offered the girls a ride home, and due to a lack of other options, they accepted. Jasmine got on the first motorbike with Lottimore, and Rebecca got on the second motorbike with Smith and Mundy.

At approximately 3:30 a.m. the occupants of a vehicle found a young woman partially naked and bleeding on Ferry Road in northeast St. George's. She was conscious, but her throat was slashed and she was unable to speak. The occupants of the vehicle sent a bystander to call police. However, when emergency services arrived on scene minutes later she had already died due to her injuries. The medical examination later found that she had been raped, sodomized, and stabbed over 30 times. A medical examiner would later testify that there was bruising on her body that indicated she had been held down by someone during the assault, and that the crime was likely committed by more than one individual.

At approximately 3:45 a.m. Jasmine arrived at her family home in Flatts and was unable to find Rebecca. She woke up her father Rick to tell him that Rebecca was missing, and they soon commenced their own search of the island.

== Arrests and trials ==
On July 10, 1996, Bermuda police arrested Justis Smith, 17, and Jamaican National Kirk Mundy, 21. Smith was charged with premeditated murder and Mundy was charged with being an accessory to the crime. At the time Mundy was on bail for the armed robbery of a bank vehicle in November 1995 for which he would later serve a 16-year sentence. On Oct. 16, 1996, Mundy was offered a plea deal by the prosecution in exchange for testifying against Smith and accepted a sentence of 5 years in prison for being an accessory to the crime. However, two years later in 1998, he was charged with murder amid new DNA evidence which indicated that he had perpetrated the violent sexual assault. In July 1998, Britain's Privy Council rejected this attempt to prosecute Mundy again due to the legal principle of double jeopardy.

In November 1998, Justis Smith was tried for his part in the murder. Smith alleged that Mundy had been the primary perpetrator of the offence and contradicted Mundy's testimony. Judge Vincent Meerabux ultimately directed the jury to acquit Smith, stating there was not enough evidence to convict him of the offence. A retrial was ordered, but Smith was acquitted for a second time.

In March 2006, Bermuda's Head of Prosecutions ruled out the possibility of fresh charges related to serious sexual assault, torture and kidnapping. In April 2007, Human-rights lawyer Cherie Booth argued at a hearing for Mundy and Smith to be tried again but the Chief Justice of Bermuda refused to allow any new charges.

In 2017, Mundy was deported back to his home country of Jamaica after serving his prison sentence for armed robbery and being an accessory to a crime.

== Controversy ==
The case attracted international outrage and controversy due to how it was mishandled by the Bermudan police, prosecutors, and judicial officials. The choice to offer Mundy a plea deal before a full investigation was completed was widely criticized since DNA evidence would later indicate he was more involved in the offence than originally suspected. Canadian news outlets felt that the charges laid on Smith and Mundy did not adequately match the brutality of the crime and that the Bermudan justice system was being too lenient on violent sex crimes. Critics also alleged that prosecutors were intent on securing a guilty plea in order to preserve the Bermuda's national image as a safe tourist destination and wanted to resolve the case as quickly as possible.

Furthermore, a poorly executed police investigation, improper evidence handling, and an inexperienced prosecution ultimately resulted in the acquittal of Justis Smith. According to media reports, the head prosecutor for the case left the prosecution team one week before the case began, and the Bermuda police were widely criticized for their inconsistent physical evidence collection. The prosecution of Smith failed in part because the prosecutors were unable to convincingly prove that Smith was primarily responsible for Rebecca's death when most of the physical evidence more strongly implicated Mundy. In 2000, the British Privy Council criticized Judge Vincent Meerabux for throwing out the case and ordered a retrial, but the second trial also failed to secure a conviction.

== Legacy ==
In 2007, Rebecca's family and local Bermudans started the Rebecca Middleton Foundation to help fund further legal proceedings against the suspects and offer victim support and community based crime prevention services to women. In 2006, the Bermuda National Trust created the Rebecca Middleton nature reserve and installed a memorial plaque in her name.
