= Don Branigan =

Canadian politician and medical doctor

Mayor of Whitehorse
- In office 1979–1982
- Preceded by: Art Deer
- Succeeded by: Flo Whyard
- In office 1984–1991
- Preceded by: Flo Whyard
- Succeeded by: Bill Weigand

Personal details
- Born: 1933 Loverna, Saskatchewan, Canada
- Died: June 27, 1999 (aged 66) Carcross, Yukon, Canada
- Occupation: medical doctor

Donald W. Branigan (1933 – June 27, 1999) was a Canadian politician and medical doctor, best known as a former mayor of Whitehorse, Yukon. As a medical doctor, he was also noted for his frequent legal conflicts with medical licensing bodies opposed to his use of holistic medical practices such as acupuncture.

== Background ==
Born in Loverna, Saskatchewan, Branigan trained as a medical doctor at the University of Alberta. Practicing as a rural family doctor, he was mayor of the town of Manning, Alberta, a Liberal Party of Canada candidate for Peace River in the 1968 federal election, and a candidate for the leadership of the Alberta Liberal Party in its 1969 leadership race, before moving to Yukon.

== Move to Whitehorse ==
He later moved to Whitehorse, where he resumed his medical practice. In this period, he began to introduce holistic therapies into his practice, resulting in frequent conflict with the Yukon Medical Council and other authorities. The Whitehorse General Hospital revoked his hospital privileges in 1979; although they denied that the revocation had anything to do with his holistic practices, they did not publicize an alternate reason. In 1985, the council revoked his license to practice medicine, although it was reinstated a month later. In 1988, the medical council charged him with 103 counts of fraud relating to his medical billing practices, although 42 of the charges were withdrawn in the trial phase and he was acquitted of the other 61 charges in 1989.

== Politics ==
He ran three times for election to the Yukon Territorial Council, losing in the 1970 election to Norman Chamberlist and in the 1974 election to Willard Phelps. He filed a petition against Phelps' election on conflict of interest grounds, which resulted in Phelps' election being voided in 1975. He then ran in the by-election to succeed Phelps, but lost to Walt Lengerke.

He served as mayor of Whitehorse from 1979 to 1982, and from 1984 to 1991. As mayor, he was noted for some quirky ideas, such as suggesting that Whitehorse handle its sewage treatment needs by building a large ultrasonic blaster, and having a pyramid built over the council chambers at Whitehorse City Hall as a spiritual conduit, but was also highly regarded for his practical focus on economic development in the Yukon — in particular, he frequently called attention to the fact that the territory's wealth of natural resources offered it many opportunities to become more economically self-sufficient by expanding into manufacturing industries.

He ran twice in the electoral district of Whitehorse North Centre for the Legislative Assembly of Yukon, as an independent candidate in the 1982 territorial election and as a Yukon Liberal Party candidate in the 1989 territorial election. Federally, he ran as a Liberal candidate for Yukon in the 1972 election, the 1987 by-election resulting from the retirement of Erik Nielsen and the 1993 election, and as an independent candidate in the 1997 election. He did not win any of the elections to the higher offices.

Upon his retirement as a medical doctor, he moved to Carcross where he died on June 27, 1999, after collapsing from a heart attack.
