= Pencil Box =

Canadian children's television series

Pencil Box is a children's television program broadcast by CBC Television from 1976 to 1979. The program comprised stories written by Ottawa students, mostly aged 8 to 12, and incorporated various story-telling devices, such as mime, puppets, masks, and animation. Colour-separation overlay was used to place live actors in front of cutout sets. Children could submit ideas for stories that would be played out by the characters.

Recurring characters in the show were

- Bolo Bat
- Stubby Pencil
- Miffy Skunk
- Clara Cactus

The show won an ACTRA Award for Best Children's Television Show at the 9th ACTRA Awards in 1979. However, the show would be canceled in 1979 as a result of children submitting stories based on already existing properties.
