= Art Webster =

Canadian politician

MLA for Klondike
- In office 1985–1992
- Preceded by: Clarke Ashley
- Succeeded by: David Millar

Personal details
- Born: Arthur Victor Webster; December 31, 1946 (age 79) Toronto, Ontario, Canada
- Party: New Democrat

Arthur Victor Webster is a former Canadian politician, who represented the electoral district of Klondike in the Yukon Legislative Assembly from 1985 to 1992. He was a member of the Yukon New Democratic Party.

He was defeated by David Millar of the Yukon Party in the 1992 election. He subsequently served as mayor of Dawson City from 1994 to 1996.
