= Tannereye =

Canadian sunglasses company

Tannereye Ltd
- Founded: 1976; 49 years ago
- Founders: Peter Leunes; Maureen Leunes
- Headquarters: Charlottetown, Prince Edward Island, Canada

Tannereye Ltd was a Canadian sunglasses manufacturing company, specializing in leather covered sunglasses. It was established in 1978 by Peter and Maureen Leunes on Prince Edward Island.

Tannereye was the first company to adhere very thin leather to optical frames.

== History ==
In the early 1970s, Peter Leunes had the idea of putting leather onto eyeglass frames. It took several years to make this concept a reality. They used a process that immersed the plastic frame in an acetone solution, activating the plastic surface to allow the leather to adhere permanently. Tannereye Ralph Lauren's Polo was one of the first companies retail this product. The company's major client for many years was Bausch & Lomb, where leather was applied to Ray-Ban frames. In 22 years, Tannereye produced over five million leather covered glasses. In the later years of the company also produced leather appliques on apparel, screens and leather covered sculptures.

Because of the steady Bausch & Lomb orders, Tannereye was a major Charlottetown employer through the 1980s but dependence on a single product for revenue was a challenge for long term stability. To address this, Peter Leunes, with employees Frank Hale and Carl Drew, developed and marketed new products mostly in the decorative accessory line.

The Leunes family eventually sold their interests in the company to a group of employees who developed the new products further and who operated it successfully in areas of leather covered sculptures for several years. Following the death of the owner in the early 1990s, the company closed.

== See also ==
- Browline glasses
- Horn-rimmed glasses
- Rimless eyeglasses
