= Doug Phillips (politician) =

Canadian politician

Doug Phillips OY
- Phillips in 2016

Commissioner of Yukon
- In office December 17, 2010 – January 31, 2018
- Prime Minister: Stephen Harper; Justin Trudeau
- Premier: Dennis Fentie; Darrell Pasloski; Sandy Silver
- Preceded by: Geraldine Van Bibber
- Succeeded by: Angélique Bernard

MLA for Riverdale North
- In office May 13, 1985 – April 17, 2000
- Preceded by: Chris Pearson
- Succeeded by: Dale Eftoda

Personal details
- Born: Douglas George Phillips; December 4, 1946 (age 79) Toronto, Ontario, Canada
- Party: Yukon Progressive Conservative Party (1985-1992); Yukon Party (1992-2000)
- Spouse: Dale Stokes
- Profession: businessman

Douglas George Phillips OY (born December 4, 1946) is a Canadian businessman and politician and the commissioner of Yukon from 2010 to 2018.

Born in Toronto in 1946, Phillips moved to Whitehorse with his family as a child. He was first elected to the Yukon Legislative Assembly in 1985, serving fifteen years as the Yukon Party MLA for the territorial riding of Riverdale North. He served in the cabinet of Premier John Ostashek, holding the positions of Minister of Tourism, Minister of Education, Minister Responsible for the Women's Directorate, Minister of Justice, and Minister Responsible for the Public Service Commission. He retired from the Legislature in 2000, and was appointed to numerous boards and commissions in the years afterwards. In 2004, he joined the Yukon Land Use Planning Council, and was serving as its chair when he was appointed Commissioner of Yukon by Prime Minister Stephen Harper. He was also the Yukon Administrator (also referred to as the "assistant commissioner") at the time of his appointment.

Phillips's appointment gained wide approval in the territory.

Phillips and his wife, Dale Stokes, have five children and five grandchildren. Phillips is also an adopted member of the Carcross/Tagish First Nation's Deisheetaan clan. Phillips was appointed to the Order of Yukon in 2020.
