= Stuart McCall (politician) =

Canadian politician

Member of the Yukon Territorial Council for Pelly River
- In office 1974–1978
- Preceded by: first member
- Succeeded by: riding dissolved

Personal details
- Born: February 11, 1942 Manchester, England
- Died: July 27, 2002 (aged 60) Zeballos, British Columbia, Canada
- Party: Independent → New Democratic Party
- Occupation: miner, labour unionist

Stuart McCall (February 11, 1942 – July 27, 2002) was a Canadian politician who served on the Yukon Territorial Council, representing the electoral district of Pelly River from 1974 to 1978.

Originally from Manchester, England, McCall moved to Canada as a young adult. He settled in Faro, Yukon, working in the local mines and rising to become a leader in the labour union local. He was elected to the territorial council in the 1974 election, winning the seat by just ten votes over Paul White. In the legislature, he was particularly prominent as a defender of labour rights, particularly when workers in Faro's mines staged a wildcat strike. Despite their significantly different ideologies, however, he was a close friend of council colleague Ken McKinnon, with both men frequently dining with each other's families when the council was in session.

In the 1978 election, the first conventional partisan election to the new Legislative Assembly of Yukon, McCall ran as a Yukon New Democratic Party candidate in the new electoral district of Faro, but was defeated by independent candidate Maurice Byblow. He left the territory in 1980, moving to Zeballos, British Columbia, to take a job as foreman in the municipal public works department. He held that job until 1992, when he retired to work for himself as an independent contractor. During his time in Zeballos, he also spent eight years as a trustee on the town's school district board.

He died on July 27, 2002, at his home in Zeballos.

== Electoral record ==
1974 Yukon general election
Party	Candidate	Votes	%	±%
Independent	Stuart McCall	187	35.68	–
Independent	Paul White	177	33.77	–
Independent	Barry Redfern	160	30.53	–
Total		524	100.0%	–

1978 Yukon general election
Party	Candidate	Votes	%	±%
Independent	Maurice Byblow	361	60.1%	–
NDP	Stuart McCall	231	38.9%	–
Total		594	100.0%	–
