= Flo Whyard =

Canadian politician

Florence Whyard

Member of the Yukon Territorial Council
- In office 1974–1978
- Preceded by: Ken McKinnon
- Succeeded by: Tony Penikett
- Constituency: Whitehorse West

Mayor of Whitehorse, Yukon
- In office 1982–1984
- Preceded by: Don Branigan
- Succeeded by: Don Branigan

Personal details
- Born: January 13, 1917 London, Ontario
- Died: April 23, 2012 (aged 95) Whitehorse, Yukon

Florence "Flo" Whyard (January 13, 1917 – April 23, 2012) was a Canadian politician and former newspaper editor of the Whitehorse Star.

In 1974, at the age of 57, she was elected to the Yukon Territorial Council, representing the Whitehorse West constituency. She served as a minister of the Yukon territorial cabinet from 1975 to 1978. She was elected the mayor of Whitehorse, the capital and largest city of Yukon. She served as mayor from 1982 to 1984, and shepherded the construction of the city's Macauley Lodge. Whyard died on April 23, 2012, in Whitehorse at the age of 95.
