= Frank Fingland =

Canadian civil servant (1928–2025)

Commissioner Frank Fingland

Commissioner of Yukon
- In office November 1, 1978 – January 20, 1979
- Prime Minister: Pierre Trudeau
- Premier: Chris Pearson
- Preceded by: Arthur MacDonald Pearson
- Succeeded by: Ione Jean Christensen

Personal details
- Born: October 8, 1928 Toronto, Ontario, Canada
- Spouse: January 27, 2025 (aged 96)

Frank Fingland (October 8, 1928 – January 27, 2025) was a Canadian civil servant who was the commissioner of Yukon from November 1, 1978 until January 19, 1979. He was preceded by Arthur MacDonald Pearson and succeeded by Ione Jean Christensen.

== Life and career ==
Fingland was born in Toronto, Ontario on October 8, 1928. He adopted a First Nations son, John. His family, living in Ontario, moved to Yukon when Fingland was appointed Yukon's deputy minister of finance.

Fingland died on January 27, 2025, at the age of 96.
