= Ione Christensen =

Canadian politician (1933–2025)

The Honourable Ione Christensen CM OY

Senator for Yukon
- In office September 2, 1999 – December 31, 2006
- Nominated by: Jean Chrétien
- Preceded by: Paul Lucier
- Succeeded by: Daniel Lang

Commissioner of Yukon
- In office January 20, 1979 – October 6, 1979
- Prime Minister: Pierre Trudeau; Joe Clark
- Premier: Chris Pearson
- Preceded by: Frank Fingland
- Succeeded by: Douglas Bell

Mayor of Whitehorse, Yukon
- In office 1976–1979
- Preceded by: Paul Lucier
- Succeeded by: Art Deer

Personal details
- Born: Ione Jean Cameron; October 10, 1933 Dawson Creek, British Columbia, Canada
- Died: September 15, 2025 (aged 91)
- Party: Liberal (federal)
- Spouse: Arthur Carsten Christensen (m. 1958; died 2020)

Ione Jean Christensen, CM OY, (née Cameron; October 10, 1933 – September 15, 2025) was a Canadian politician who served as a Senator.

== Life and career ==
The daughter of former North-West Mounted Police constable Gordon Irwin Cameron, and Dawson City born Martha Ballentine Cameron, her family moved to Whitehorse in 1949. Christensen graduated from high school in 1953. She received an associate in arts degree in business administration from the College of San Mateo in California. In 1968, she married Art Christensen, a geologist.

In 1971, she was appointed the first woman Justice of the peace and judge of the Juvenile court in Yukon. In 1975, she was elected the first woman mayor of Whitehorse; on the same day, Yolanda Burkhard was elected as the first woman mayor of Dawson City. In 1979, she served as the commissioner of Yukon, being the first woman to be appointed commissioner.

In 1980, she ran unsuccessfully as a Liberal candidate in the federal election for the riding of Yukon. She lost by 101 votes to the incumbent Progressive Conservative MP Erik Nielsen.

In 1994, she was appointed a Member of the Order of Canada (CM), which her father was also a member of. In 1999, Christensen was appointed at the recommendation of Prime Minister Jean Chrétien to the Senate.

On December 31, 2006, Christensen resigned from the Senate to assist her ailing husband. Her husband died in 2020.

In 2019, she was made a member of the Order of Yukon's inaugural class. The first 10 recipients were named ahead of the ceremony on December 2, 2019. Christensen also received the Queen Elizabeth II Golden Jubilee Medal in 2002, the Queen Elizabeth II Diamond Jubilee Medal in 2012, and the King Charles III Coronation Medal in 2023.

Christensen died on September 15, 2025, at the age of 91.
