= Fred Berger (politician) =

Canadian politician

Leader of the Yukon New Democratic Party
- In office 1978–1981
- Preceded by: first leader
- Succeeded by: Tony Penikett

Personal details
- Born: 1932 Vienna, Austria
- Died: 2009 (aged 76–77)
- Party: New Democrat

Fred Berger (1932–2009) was a Canadian politician. First elected to the non-partisan Yukon Territorial Council in the 1974 territorial election, he became the first leader of the Yukon New Democratic Party when the territory adopted political parties for the first time in the 1978 election. Berger was not elected to the Yukon Legislative Assembly, however, losing to Meg McCall in the Klondike electoral district.

He remained leader of the party until 1981, when he was succeeded by Tony Penikett. He later operated a number of businesses, including a movie theatre and a drug store, in Dawson City, but remained a prominent activist within the party until his death in 2009.
