= Arthur MacDonald Pearson =

Canadian politician (1938–2020)

Commissioner Arthur MacDonald Pearson

Commissioner of Yukon
- In office July 1, 1976 – November 1, 1978
- Prime Minister: Pierre Trudeau
- Preceded by: James Smith
- Succeeded by: Frank Fingland

Personal details
- Born: February 20, 1938 Brandon, Manitoba, Canada
- Died: December 8, 2020 (aged 82)
- Spouse: Sandra Mooney (m. 1959)
- Profession: Biologist

Arthur MacDonald "Art" Pearson (February 20, 1938 – December 8, 2020) was a Canadian political figure. He served as the commissioner of Yukon from 1976 to 1978.

He was born in Brandon, Manitoba and was educated there, at the University of British Columbia and the University of Helsinki. In 1959, Pearson married Sandra Mooney. He was a biologist with the Canadian Wildlife Service from 1962 to 1975, during that time he researched the activities of grizzly bears. Pearson lived in Whitehorse.

He resigned as commissioner in 1978 after pleading guilty to charges related to improper mining claim transfers. Pearson died after a long battle with chronic lymphocytic leukemia on December 8, 2020, at the age of 82.
