= Jack Hibberd (politician) =

Canadian politician (1931–1997)

Member of the Yukon Territorial Council for Whitehorse South Centre
- In office 1974–1978
- Preceded by: first member
- Succeeded by: council dissolved

MLA for Whitehorse South Centre
- In office 1978–1981
- Preceded by: first member
- Succeeded by: Roger Kimmerly

Personal details
- Born: 1931 Vancouver, British Columbia
- Died: May 15, 1997 (aged 65–66) Penticton, British Columbia
- Party: Progressive Conservative
- Occupation: surgeon

John (Jack) Hibberd (1931 – May 15, 1997) was a Canadian politician and medical doctor, who represented the electoral district of Whitehorse South Centre in the Yukon Territorial Council and the Legislative Assembly of Yukon from 1974 to 1981.

Born and raised in Vancouver, British Columbia, he was educated as a surgeon, and later moved to Yukon to accept a position at Whitehorse General Hospital.

First elected to the territorial council in 1974, during his term he served on the executive committee as minister of consumer and corporate affairs and natural resources.

When territorial political parties were created for the 1978 election he joined the Yukon Progressive Conservative Party. He was reelected to the new legislative assembly in 1978.

Hibberd resigned his seat in the legislature on April 15, 1981, after accepting a position as a surgical consultant with a hospital in British Columbia. He was succeeded in a by-election by Roger Kimmerly of the Yukon New Democratic Party, resulting in the NDP overtaking the Yukon Liberal Party in seats and supplanting them as the Official Opposition.

He died on May 15, 1997, in Penticton, British Columbia.
