= James Smith (Yukon politician) =

Canadian politician (1919–2017)

Commissioner James Smith

Member of the Yukon Territorial Council
- In office 1958–1961
- Preceded by: Jack Hulland
- Succeeded by: John Watt
- Constituency: Whitehorse West

Commissioner of Yukon
- In office November 7, 1966 – July 1, 1976
- Prime Minister: Lester B. Pearson; Pierre Trudeau
- Preceded by: Gordon Robertson Cameron
- Succeeded by: Arthur MacDonald Pearson

Personal details
- Born: December 31, 1919 Revelstoke, British Columbia
- Died: April 14, 2017 (aged 97)
- Spouse: Dorothy Matson (m. 1947)
- Profession: businessman

James M. Smith OC (December 31, 1919 – April 14, 2017) was the longest serving commissioner of Yukon from November 7, 1966 to June 30, 1976. During his tenure, he was instrumental in the creation of Kluane National Park and Reserve and the designation of the Chilkoot Trail as a National Historic Site of Canada. He was also responsible for creating the Arctic Winter Games along with Northwest Territories commissioner Stuart Hodgson and Alaska governor Walter Joseph Hickel. He was made an Officer of the Order of Canada in 1976.
