= Whitehorse City Council =

Leadership
- Mayor: Kirk Cameron (elect)

Structure
- Seats: 6 councillors and mayor

Elections
- Last election: 17 October 2024

Meeting place
- Whitehorse City Hall; Whitehorse, Yukon

Website
- City Council website

Whitehorse City Council is the governing body of the city of Whitehorse, Yukon, Canada. The council consists of a mayor plus six councillors elected at large for three-year terms. Starting October 2024, the mayor and councillors will serve four-year terms. The current mayor of Whitehorse is Laura Cabott, since 2021.

Governance of the city was temporarily transferred to a taxpayer advisory committee led by Joseph Oliver for part of 1973, after five of the city's six councillors resigned on July 9, 1973 in protest against a jurisdictional dispute with the Yukon Territorial Council, leaving the council without a quorum to conduct city business. A by-election was held on September 20, 1973 to elect a new council.

== Council composition ==
=== 2024-2028 City Council ===
Name	Position
Kirk Cameron	Mayor
Dan Boyd	Councillor
Lenore Morris	Councillor
Paolo Gallina	Councillor
Anne Middler	Councillor
Jenny Hamilton	Councillor
Eileen Melnychuk	Councillor

=== 2021-2024 City Council ===
Name	Position
Laura Cabott	Mayor
Melissa Murray	Councillor
Michelle Friesen	Councillor
Dan Boyd	Councillor
Jocelyn Curteanu	Councillor
Ted Laking	Councillor
Kirk Cameron	Councillor

=== 2018-2021 City Council ===
Name	Position
Dan Curtis	Mayor
Jan Stick	Councillor
Jocelyn Curteanu	Councillor
Steve Roddick	Councillor
Samson Hartland	Councillor
Laura Cabott	Councillor
Dan Boyd	Councillor
