= Commissioner of Yukon =

- Commissaire du Yukon
- Badge of the Commissioner of Yukon

- Flag of the Commissioner of Yukon
- Incumbent; Adeline Webber since 31 May 2023
- Style: The Honourable
- Inaugural holder: James Morrow Walsh
- Formation: August 17, 1897
- Website: commissionerofyukon.ca

The commissioner of Yukon (French: Commissaire du Yukon) is the representative of the Government of Canada in the Canadian federal territory of Yukon. The commissioner is appointed by the federal government and, in contrast to the governor general of Canada or the lieutenant governors of the Canadian provinces, is not a viceroy and therefore not a direct representative of the Canadian monarch in the territory eo ipso.

== List of commissioners ==
=== Commissioners (1894–1918) ===
Before the Yukon became a Territory on June 13, 1898, the Dominion agent/gold commissioner (Constantine and Fawcett) and the chief executive officer of the Yukon (Walsh for the first part of his term) was the Yukon representative.

No.	Image	Commissioner	Term start	Term end
1		Inspector Charles Constantine	May 26, 1894	May 27, 1897
2		Thomas Fawcett	May 27, 1897	August 17, 1897
3		James Morrow Walsh	August 17, 1897	July 4, 1898
4		William Ogilvie	July 4, 1898	March 11, 1901
5		James Hamilton Ross	March 11, 1901	October 16, 1902
6		Henry William Newlands (Acting)	February 8, 1902	August 15, 1902
7		Zachary Taylor Wood (Acting)	August 15, 1902	March 4, 1903
8		Frederick Tennyson Congdon	March 4, 1903	October 27, 1904
9		Zachary Taylor Wood (Acting)	October 29, 1904	May 27, 1905
10		William Wallace Burns McInnes	May 27, 1905	December 31, 1906
11		John T. Lithgow (Acting)	December 31, 1906	June 17, 1907
12		Alexander Henderson	June 17, 1907	June 1, 1911
13		Arthur Wilson (Administrator)	June 1, 1911	February 1, 1912
14		George Black	February 1, 1912	April 1, 1918
15		George Norris Williams (Administrator while Black fought in WWI)	October 13, 1916	April 1, 1918

=== Gold commissioners ===
The offices of Commissioner and Administrator were abolished in 1918. Office replaced by the Gold Commissioner who was responsible to the federal Minister of the Interior (and since 1936 the Minister of Mines and Resources).

No.	Gold Commissioner	Term start	Term end
16	George P. MacKenzie	April 1, 1918	November 16, 1924
17	Percy Reid	November 17, 1924	November 14, 1927
18	George A. Jeckell (Acting)	November 14, 1927	September 10, 1928
19	George I. MacLean	September 10, 1928	June 30, 1932

=== Comptrollers ===
The positions of Gold Commissioner and Comptroller were combined in 1932 with the Comptroller being the title for the chief executive. The title was changed to "Controller" in 1936.

No.	Controller	Term start	Term end
20	George A. Jeckell Comptroller (1932–36) Controller (1936–47)	June 30, 1932	September 20, 1947
21	John Edward Gibben	September 20, 1947	July 12, 1948

=== Commissioners (1948–present) ===
In 1948, the title of chief executive once again became Commissioner. By the 1960s, the Commissioner had formed an executive committee that included some members of the elected Territorial Council, in essence a cabinet. (By the mid-1970s, the Territorial Council was referring to itself as a Legislative Assembly, and its members MLAs rather than Councillors.) Beginning in 1978, Yukon had party government with a Government Leader.

In October 1979, federal minister Jake Epp (Indian Affairs and Northern Development) issued a letter, often known as the Epp letter, instructing the Commissioner to assume a role similar to that of a provincial Lieutenant-Governor, and devolving leadership of the day-to-day government to the majority leader of the legislative assembly (territorial council), to whom the Epp letter granted the authority to use the title Premier. At that time, the government leader added a fifth elected member to the committee, which became an executive council.

Subsequent federal ministers did not revoke this authority and instruction, which was eventually codified in amendments to the Yukon Act, along with redesignation of the legislative assembly from territorial council. The process, particularly since 1979, has devolved powers from the federal government to the territorial government, bringing authority which is normally reserved by the Articles of Confederation for provinces to the territory.

No.	Commissioner	Term start	Term end
21	John Edward Gibben	July 13, 1948	August 15, 1950
22	Andrew Harold Gibson	August 15, 1950	October 15, 1951
23	Frederick Fraser	October 15, 1951	November 15, 1952
24	Wilfred George Brown	November 15, 1952	June 8, 1955
25	Frederick Howard Collins	June 8, 1955	May 1, 1962
26	Gordon Robertson Cameron	May 1, 1962	November 7, 1966
27	James Smith	November 7, 1966	July 1, 1976
28	Arthur MacDonald Pearson	July 1, 1976	October 31, 1978
29	Frank Fingland	October 31, 1978	January 19, 1979
30	Ione Christensen	January 20, 1979	October 9, 1979
31	Douglas Bell	October 9, 1979	March 27, 1986
32	Ken McKinnon	March 27, 1986	June 11, 1995
33	Judy Gingell	June 12, 1995	September 30, 2000
34	Jack Cable	October 1, 2000	November 30, 2005
35	Geraldine Van Bibber	December 1, 2005	December 16, 2010
36	Doug Phillips	December 17, 2010	January 31, 2018
37	Angélique Bernard	March 12, 2018	May 31, 2023
38	Adeline Webber	May 31, 2023	Incumbent
