= Legislature of Yukon =

- 36th Yukon Legislative Assembly

Type
- Type: Unicameral
- Houses: Territorial Council (1898–1978); Legislative Assembly (1978–)

History
- Founded: 1898
- Preceded by: Northwest Territories Legislature

Meeting place
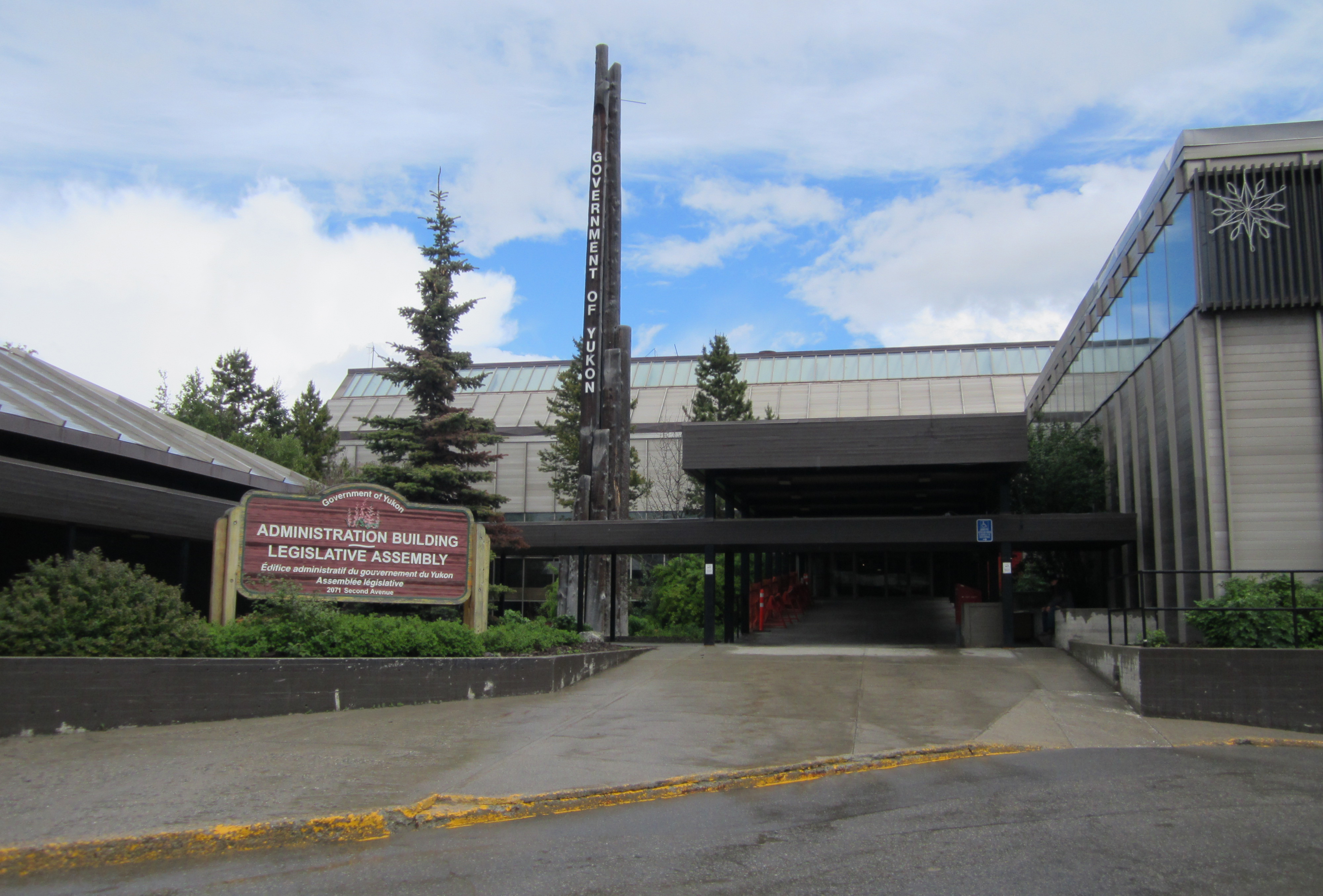
- Legislative Building, Whitehorse, Yukon, Canada

The Legislature of Yukon is the legislature of the territory of Yukon, Canada. The legislature is made of two elements: the Commissioner of Yukon, who represents the federal government of Canada, and the unicameral assembly Yukon Legislative Assembly. The legislature has existed since Yukon was formed out of part of the Northwest Territories in 1898.

Like the Canadian federal government, Yukon uses a Westminster-style parliamentary government, in which members are sent to the Legislative Assembly after general elections and from there the party with the most seats chooses a Premier of Yukon and Executive Council of Yukon. The premier acts as Yukon's head of government. Being creatures of the federal government, Canadian territories do not have heads of state, but the role of the Commissioner is somewhat analogous to the role of a provincial lieutenant governor.

== History ==
The Yukon Act of 1898 created the territory's first administration, the Yukon Territorial Council which was appointed by the Government of Canada. In 1900, elections were held to add two additional members to the council. Additional elected members were added, and by 1909 all councillors were elected. However, executive power remained in the hands of a commissioner appointed by the federal government.

Population of the territory fell after the end of the Klondike gold rush, and in 1920 the council was reduced from 10 members to 3. The council grew from the 1950s, reaching 16 members in 1978, when political parties were introduced. 1978 also saw the first election of First Nations members to the council.

The Yukon Act of 2003 legally changed the name of the council to the Legislative Assembly of Yukon, a name the council itself had adopted in 1974. Because of its relatively small size (19 MLAs in 2011), MLAs appointed to cabinet are usually responsible for more than one government department, and bills are worked upon in the assembly as a committee of the whole rather than being sent to specialized committees.

== List of legislatures ==
Following is a list of the times the legislature has been convened since 1898.

=== Yukon Territorial Council ===
- Provisional Yukon Territorial Council – 1898–1909
- 1st Yukon Territorial Council – 1909–1912
- 2nd Yukon Territorial Council – 1912–1915
- 3rd Yukon Territorial Council – 1915–1917
- 4th Yukon Territorial Council – 1917–1920
- 5th Yukon Territorial Council – 1920–1922
- 6th Yukon Territorial Council – 1922–1925
- 7th Yukon Territorial Council – 1925–1928
- 8th Yukon Territorial Council – 1928–1931
- 9th Yukon Territorial Council – 1931–1934
- 10th Yukon Territorial Council – 1934–1937
- 11th Yukon Territorial Council – 1937–1940
- 12th Yukon Territorial Council – 1940–1944
- 13th Yukon Territorial Council – 1944–1947
- 14th Yukon Territorial Council – 1947–1949
- 15th Yukon Territorial Council – 1949–1952
- 16th Yukon Territorial Council – 1952–1955
- 17th Yukon Territorial Council – 1955–1958
- 18th Yukon Territorial Council – 1958–1961
- 19th Yukon Territorial Council – 1961–1964
- 20th Yukon Territorial Council – 1964–1967
- 21st Yukon Territorial Council – 1967–1970
- 22nd Yukon Territorial Council – 1970–1974
- 23rd Yukon Territorial Council – 1974–1978

=== Legislative Assembly of Yukon ===
- 24th Legislature of Yukon – 1978–1982
- 25th Legislature of Yukon – 1982–1985
- 26th Legislature of Yukon – 1985–1989
- 27th Legislature of Yukon – 1989–1992
- 28th Legislature of Yukon – 1992–1996
- 29th Legislature of Yukon – 1996–2000
- 30th Legislature of Yukon – 2000–2002
- 31st Legislature of Yukon – 2002–2006
- 32nd Legislature of Yukon – 2006–2011
- 33rd Legislature of Yukon – 2011–2016
- 34th Legislature of Yukon – 2016–2021
- 35th Legislature of Yukon – 2021–2025
- 36th Legislature of Yukon – 2025–present
