= List of Yukon general elections =

Canadian territorial elections

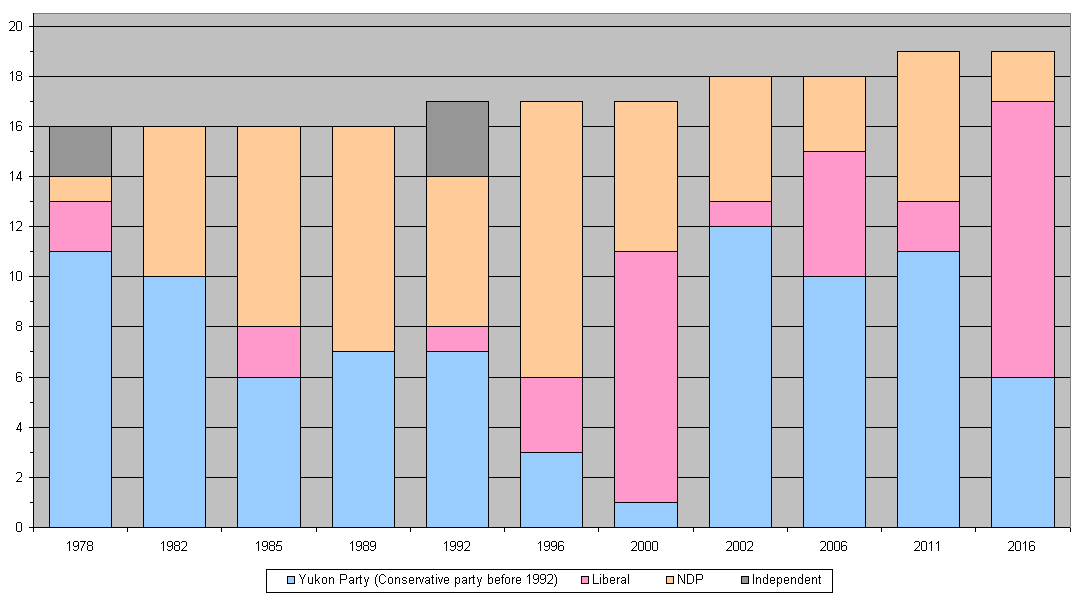
Number of seats won by major parties at each election: Yukon Party / Progressive Conservative / Liberal / NDP / Independent

This article provides a summary of results for the general elections to the Canadian territory of Yukon's unicameral legislative body, the Yukon Legislative Assembly, formerly the Yukon Territorial Council. The number of members in the Yukon assembly has increased over time, from six appointed members in the late 1800s, to eight (only two elected) in Yukon's first election in 1900, to the current nineteen (all elected).

From 1898 to 1978, the legislative body in Yukon was the Yukon Territorial Council. This body did not act as the primary government, but was a non-partisan advisory body to the Commissioner of the Yukon. At the beginning it did not have law-making ability and was composed of appointed members or mixture of appointed and elected members.

Political parties were used on some pre-1920 elections but then fell out of use. Parties were introduced in 1978, when the Yukon Legislative Assembly was established.

Yukon used multi-member districts during part of its early history. In 1903 and from 1909 to 1920, two members were elected at a time in all or some of its districts. Other times it used single-member districts.

Since 1978, each riding (electoral district) has elected one member by first past the post to the Yukon Legislative Assembly. Political parties were officially recognized and registered beginning in 1978. Yukon is the only Canadian territory to have a partisan legislature.

The chart on the right shows the information graphically, with the most recent elections on the right (going as far back as the introduction of political parties in 1978). The Yukon Party (which was named the Yukon Progressive Conservative Party prior to 1992) has been the most successful since political parties were officially recognised, having won seven out of thirteen elections. The NDP and the Liberal parties have both won three elections.

== 1978–present ==
=== Summary of results ===
The table below shows the total number of seats won by the major political parties at each election. It also shows the percentage of the vote obtained by the major political parties at each election. The winning party's total's are shown in bold. There have been two elections (in 1985 and 2021) where the party that formed the government did not have the largest share of the vote. Full details on any election are linked via the year of the election at the start of the row.

Election		Total seats	Yukon Party^{[A]}		Liberal		NDP		Independent	
Election		Total seats	Vote (%)	Seats	Vote (%)	Seats	Vote (%)	Seats	Vote (%)	Seats
28th	November 20, 1978	16	**37.1%**	**11**	26.0%	2	20.3%	1	16.6%	2
29th	June 7, 1982	16	**45.8%**	**9**	15.0%	0	35.4%	6	3.8%	1
30th	May 13, 1985	16	46.9%	6	7.6%	2	**41.1%**	**8**	4.4%	0
31st	February 20, 1989	16	43.9%	7	11.1%	0	**45.0%**	**9**	–	0
32nd	October 19, 1992	17	**35.9%**	**7**	16.1%	1	35.1%	6	12.9%	3
33rd	September 30, 1996	17	30.4%	3	23.9%	3	**39.8%**	**11**	5.9%	0
34th	April 17, 2000	17	24.3%	1	**42.9%**	**10**	32.8%	6	–	0
35th	November 4, 2002	18	**40.3%**	**12**	29.0%	1	26.9%	5	3.8%	0
36th	October 10, 2006	18	**40.6%**	**10**	34.7%	5	23.6%	3	1.1%	0
37th	October 11, 2011	19	**40.5%**	**11**	25.2%	2	32.6%	6	0.50%	0
38th	November 7, 2016	19	33.4%	6	**39.4%**	**11**	26.2%	2	0.20%	0
39th	April 12, 2021	19	39.32%	8	**32.37%**	**8**	28.17%	3	0.14%	0
40th	November 3, 2025	21	**51.96%**	**14**	10.18%	1	37.80%	6	0.07%	0

2025 results are unofficial results as published on the website of Elections Yukon by the end of November 3, 2025, election day.

Note
^{A} Changed its name from Yukon Progressive Conservative Party to the Yukon Party prior to the 1992 election.

=== Number of candidates ===
Election		Total no. candidates	Yukon Party	Liberal	NDP	Independent
28th	November 20, 1978	52	15	13	14	10
29th	June 7, 1982	51	16	15	16	4
30th	May 13, 1985	44	16	8	16	4
31st	February 20, 1989	47	16	15	16	0
32nd	October 19, 1992	52	14	14	17	7
33rd	September 30, 1996	54	15	16	16	7
34th	April 17, 2000	49	15	17	17	0
35th	November 4, 2002	60	18	18	18	6
36th	October 10, 2006	58	18	18	18	4
37th	October 11, 2011	62	**19**	19	18	6
38th	November 7, 2016	63	19	**19**	19	1
39th	April 12, 2021	56	18	**19**	18	1
40th	November 3, 2025	61	**21**	18	21	1

== 1900–74 ==
There were no territorial parties in the Yukon before 1978. From the territory's creation in 1898 until 1978, the Yukon was governed by a federally appointed Commissioner advised by the Territorial Council. The Territorial council was wholly appointed from 1898 to 1900; part elected, part appointed from 1900 to 1908; and wholly elected from 1909 to 1978.

The number of members varied considerably during the council's 80-year history. The 1900 election elected just two out of eight members; the elections from 1903 to 1907 elected five out of ten members. The wholly elected Council comprised ten members from 1909, which was reduced to three starting with the 1920 election. The number of members was increased to five as of the 1952 election, seven as of the 1961 election, and twelve for the final general election to the Council in 1974.

- 1900 Yukon general election
- 1903 Yukon general election
- 1905 Yukon general election
- 1907 Yukon general election
- 1909 Yukon general election
- 1912 Yukon general election
- 1915 Yukon general election
- 1917 Yukon general election
- 1920 Yukon general election
- 1922 Yukon general election
- 1925 Yukon general election
- 1928 Yukon general election
- 1931 Yukon general election
- 1934 Yukon general election
- 1937 Yukon general election
- 1940 Yukon general election
- 1944 Yukon general election
- 1947 Yukon general election
- 1949 Yukon general election
- 1952 Yukon general election
- 1955 Yukon general election
- 1958 Yukon general election
- 1961 Yukon general election
- 1964 Yukon general election
- 1967 Yukon general election
- 1970 Yukon general election
- 1974 Yukon general election

== Bibliography ==
- "Election Results". Election Almanac. Archived from the original on July 10, 2011. (Results)
- "General Elections". Elections Yukon. (Dates; numbers of candidates/members)
- Elections Yukon. "Results by political affiliation: Elections of members to the Yukon Legislative Assembly" (MS Word document).
