= Provisional Yukon Territorial Council =

Legislature of Yukon, Canada, 1898–1909

The Provisional Yukon Territorial Council was created by Yukon Act of 1898 as an appointed body, the first election to the council took place in 1900 to elect two at-large members alongside the already-appointed ones. Until 1909, the council retained a mix of appointed and elected members, with the 1909 election being the first one to elect the entire body.

== Commissioners during the Provisional Council ==
Name	Year appointed	Year served
James Morrow Walsh	June 13, 1898	July 5, 1898
James Hamilton Ross	1898	1901
Henry William Newlands (acting)	1901	1902
Zachary Taylor Wood (1st time) (acting)	1902	1903
Frederick Congdon	1903	1904
Zachary Taylor Wood (2nd time) (acting)	1904	1905
William Wallace Burns McInnes	1905	1906
John T. Lithgow (acting)	1906	1907
Alexander Henderson (Note: Henderson continued to serve as commissioner after the fifth general election.)	1907	1909

== Members ==
=== Appointed ===
Appointments to the council were chosen by the Government of Canada.

Appointed Members of the Territorial Council
Name	Date Appointed	Date Left	Reason
Joseph-Éna Girouard	July 8, 1898	1908	
Sam Steele	July 8, 1898	September 5, 1899	Recalled to Ottawa by the federal government.
Thomas McGuire	July 8, 1898	October 7, 1898	Moved to the District of Saskatchewan.
Frederick Wade	July 8, 1898	October 17, 1898	
Calixte-Aimé Dugas	October 7, 1898		
William Henry Clement	October 17, 1898	March 13, 1901	
Aylesworth Perry	September 5, 1899	July 31, 1900	
Edmund Senkler	September 5, 1899		
Zachary Taylor Wood	July 31, 1900		
Frederick Congdon	March 13, 1901	September 14, 1901	
Henry William Newlands	September 14, 1901	1903	Appointed to Supreme Court of the Northwest Territories
John T. Lithgow	January 8, 1904		

==== Elected ====
The first election held on October 18, 1900 elected two members at large. The council would divide the territory into districts for the second general election held on January 13, 1903. Appointed members during this period did not have to be reappointed, although vacancies in appointed seats were filled with new appointments, and only seats held by elected members were vacated during elections. The elections were called by the Yukon Commissioner, while electoral district boundaries were controlled by an act of legislation from the council.

=== Members elected in 1900 ===
District	Member elected	Affiliation	First elected	No. of terms
At-large	Arthur Wilson	Yukon Party	1900	1st term
At-large	Alex Prud'homme	Yukon Party	1900	1st term

=== Members elected in 1903 ===
District	Member elected	Affiliation	First elected	No. of terms
District No. 1	Joseph Clarke	Opposition	1903	1st term
District No. 1	Alfred Thompson (Note: Alfred Thompson resigned his seat on November 3, 1904 after being elected as Yukon's federal Member of Parliament, but no by-election was held to succeed him)	Government	1903	1st term
District No. 2	John Pringle	Unknown	1903	1st term
District No. 2	Maxime Landreville	Unknown	1903	1st term
Whitehorse	Robert Lowe	Government	1903	1st term

=== Members elected in 1905 ===
District	Member elected	First elected	No. of terms
Bonanza	Richard Gillespie	1905	1st term
Klondike	George Black	1905	1st term
North Dawson	Henry Macauley	1905	1st term
South Dawson	Thomas O'Brien	1905	1st term
Whitehorse	Robert Lowe	1903	2nd term

=== Members elected in 1907 ===
District	Member elected	First elected	No. of terms
Bonanza	Thomas Kearney	1907	1st term
Klondike	George Black	1905	2nd term
North Dawson	Joseph Lachapelle	1907	1st term
South Dawson	John Grant	1907	1st term
Whitehorse	Robert Lowe	1903	3rd term
