= 22nd Yukon Territorial Council =

Legislature of Yukon, Canada, 1970–1974

The 22nd Yukon Territorial Council was in session from 1970 to 1974. Membership was set by the 1970 Yukon general election. It was the last session of the territorial council to be structured on the seven-member model that had been in place since 1961; the subsequent 23rd Yukon Territorial Council expanded the body to twelve members.

== Members ==
Councillors
District	Councillor	First elected / previously elected	No. of terms	Notes
Carmacks-Kluane	Hilda Watson	1970	1st term	Appointed to the executive committee.
Dawson	Mike Stutter	1970	1st term	
Mayo	Ronald Rivett	1970	1st term	Speaker of the Council
Watson Lake	Don Taylor	1961	4th term	
Whitehorse East	Norman Chamberlist	1961, 1967	3rd term*	Appointed to the executive committee.
Whitehorse North	Clive Tanner	1970	1st term	Replaced Chamberlist on the executive committee in 1973.
Whitehorse West	Ken McKinnon	1961, 1967	3rd term*	
