= 1970 Yukon general election =

Canadian territorial election

← 1967	September 8, 1970	1974 →

All 7 seats of the Yukon Territorial Council
- Turnout: 66.9%

The 1970 Yukon general election was held on 8 September 1970 to elect the seven members of the 22nd Yukon Territorial Council. The council was non-partisan and had merely an advisory role to the federally appointed Commissioner. There were twenty-one candidates, and 5,152 out of 7,700 electors voted, a turnout of 66.9%.

The members elected to the council were Hilda Watson, Ken McKinnon, Norman Chamberlist, Don Taylor, Clive Tanner, Mike Stutter and Ronald Rivett. Watson and Chamberlist were the two members appointed to the council's new executive committee.

== Election results ==
Candidates by district
District	Winner	Second	Third	Fourth	Fifth
Carmacks-Kluane	Hilda Watson; 314	John Livesey; 103			
Dawson	Mike Stutter; 258	Tony Penikett (NDP); 116	Fabien Salois; 108	Paul McLeod Finley; 54	Jimmy Mellor; 20
Mayo	Ronald Rivett; 248	George Dobson; 69	Jean Gordon; 46		
Watson Lake	Don Taylor; 397	R. W. Stubenberg; 275			
Whitehorse East	Norman Chamberlist; 548	Don Branigan; 362	Ralph Hudson; 348		
Whitehorse North	Clive Tanner; 372	Harvey Kent; 235	Jack Burrows; 210		
Whitehorse West	Ken McKinnon; 444	John Watt; 294	John Hoyt; 281		
