= 1961 Yukon general election =

Canadian territorial election

← 1958	September 11, 1961	1964 →

All 7 seats of the Yukon Territorial Council

The 1961 Yukon general election was held on 11 September 1961 to elect the seven members of the Yukon Territorial Council. The council was non-partisan and had merely an advisory role to the federally appointed Commissioner.

== Members elected ==
District	Member	Notes
Carmacks-Kluane	John Livesey	Speaker of the Council
Dawson	George Shaw	
Mayo	Ray McKamey	
Watson Lake	Don Taylor	
Whitehorse East	Norman Chamberlist	1961; disqualified following conflict of interest
Whitehorse East	Herbert Boyd	1962-1964
Whitehorse North	Ken McKinnon	
Whitehorse West	John Watt	
