= 19th Yukon Territorial Council =

The 19th Yukon Territorial Council was in session from 1961 to 1964. Membership was set by a general election held in 1961. The council was non-partisan and had merely an advisory role to the federally appointed Commissioner.

== Members elected ==
District	Member	First elected / previously elected	No. of terms	Notes
Carmacks-Kluane	John Livesey	1958	2nd term	Speaker of the Council
Dawson	George Shaw	1958	2nd term	
Mayo	Ray McKamey	1958	2nd term	
Watson Lake	Don Taylor	1961	1st term	
Whitehorse East	Norman Chamberlist	1961	1st term	Disqualified following conflict of interest
Whitehorse East	Herbert Boyd (1962)	1962	1st term	
Whitehorse North	Ken McKinnon	1961	1st term	
Whitehorse West	John Watt	1961	1st term	
