= 1912 Yukon general election =

Canadian territorial election

← 1909	April 29, 1912	1915 →

All 10 seats of the Yukon Territorial Council

The 1912 Yukon general election was held on April 29 to elect the ten members of the Yukon Territorial Council. The council was non-partisan and had merely an advisory role to the federally appointed Commissioner.

== Members elected ==
- Bonanza - Duncan Robertson, George Williams
- Klondike - Eugene Hogan, Archie Martin
- North Dawson - Charles William Tabor, Alarie Seguin
- South Dawson - A.J. Gillis, Isaac Lusk
- Whitehorse - Patrick Martin, Willard "Deacon" Phelps

Seguin and Lusk resigned their seats in 1914, and were succeeded in by-elections by Frederick Pearce in North Dawson and Donald McLennan in South Dawson.
