= 1964 Yukon general election =

Canadian territorial election

← 1961	September 8, 1964	1967 →

All 7 seats of the Yukon Territorial Council

The 1964 Yukon general election was held on 8 September 1964 to elect the seven members of the Yukon Territorial Council. The council was non-partisan and had merely an advisory role to the federally appointed Commissioner.

== Members elected ==
District	Member	Notes
Carmacks-Kluane	Bob MacKinnon	
Dawson	George Shaw	Speaker of the Council
Mayo	Fred Southam	
Watson Lake	Don Taylor	
Whitehorse East	Herbert Boyd	
Whitehorse North	Ken Thompson	
Whitehorse West	John Watt	
