= 1st Yukon Territorial Council =

Legislature of Yukon, Canada, 1909–1912

The 1st Yukon Territorial Council was in session from 1909 to 1912. Membership was set by a general election held in 1909. The first wholly elected Council was non-partisan and had merely an advisory role to the federally appointed Commissioner.

== Members elected ==
District	Member	First elected / previously elected	No. of terms	Notes
Bonanza	Roderick Leander Ashbaugh	1909	1st term	
Bonanza	Frank McAlpine	1909	1st term	
Klondike	Maxime Landreville	1903, 1909	2nd term*	
Klondike	Angus McLeod	1909	1st term	
North Dawson	Charles Bossuyt	1909	1st term	
North Dawson	Andrew Smith	1909	1st term	
South Dawson	George Black	1905	3rd term	
South Dawson	James William Murphy	1909	1st term	
Whitehorse	Robert Lowe	1903	4th term	Speaker of the Council
Whitehorse	Willard "Deacon" Phelps	1909	1st term	
