= 4th Yukon Territorial Council =

Legislature of Yukon, Canada, 1917–1920

The 4th Yukon Territorial Council was in session from 1917 to 1920. Membership was set by a general election held in 1917. The Council was non-partisan and had merely an advisory role to the federally appointed Commissioner.

== Members elected ==
District	Member	First elected / previously elected	No. of terms	Notes
Bonanza	John Turner	1915	2nd term	Speaker of the Council (1917-1918)
Bonanza	Allen Angus McMillan	1917	1st term	Speaker of the Council (1918-1920)
Klondike	William Campbell Lowden	1917	1st term	
Klondike	James Singleton Wilson	1917	1st term	
North Dawson	William O'Brien	1915	2nd term	
North Dawson	Maxime Landreville	1903, 1909, (Note: Klondike) 1917	3rd term*	
South Dawson	James Austin Fraser	1917	1st term	
South Dawson	Maxwell Charles Salter	1917	1st term	
Whitehorse	Willard "Deacon" Phelps	1909	4th term	
Whitehorse	Charles Henry Johnston	1917	1st term	
