= 2nd Yukon Territorial Council =

Legislature of Yukon, Canada, 1912–1915

The 2nd Yukon Territorial Council was in session from 1912 to 1915. Membership was set by a general election held in 1912. The Council was non-partisan and had merely an advisory role to the federally appointed Commissioner.

== Members elected ==
District	Member	First elected / previously elected	No. of terms	Notes
Bonanza	Duncan Robertson	1912	1st term	
Bonanza	George Norris Williams	1912	1st term	
Klondike	Eugene Hogan	1912	1st term	
Klondike	Archie Martin	1912	1st term	
North Dawson	Charles William Tabor	1912	1st term	
North Dawson	Alarie Seguin	1912	1st term	
North Dawson	Frederick Pearce (1914)	1914	1st term	
South Dawson	A.J. Gillis	1912	1st term	Speaker of the Council
South Dawson	Isaac Lusk	1912	1st term	
South Dawson	Donald McLennan (1914)	1914	1st term	
Whitehorse	Willard "Deacon" Phelps	1909	2nd term	
Whitehorse	Patrick Martin	1912	1st term	
