= 1909 Yukon general election =

Canadian territorial election

← 1907	June 28, 1909	1912 →

All 10 seats of the Yukon Territorial Council

The 1909 Yukon general election was held on 28 June 1909 to elect the ten members of the Yukon Territorial Council. The council was non-partisan and had merely an advisory role to the federally appointed Commissioner. The 1909 election marked the first time that voters in the territory elected the entire council — in the four prior elections, the council was composed of five elected representatives and five representatives appointed by the Canadian federal government.

The election was held using five two-member districts, where voters could cast two votes each.

== Members elected ==
District	Members elected
Bonanza	Roderick Leander Ashbaugh
Bonanza	Frank McAlpine
Klondike	Maxime Landreville
Klondike	Angus McLeod
North Dawson	Charles Bossuyt
North Dawson	Andrew Smith
South Dawson	George Black
South Dawson	James William Murphy
Whitehorse	Robert Lowe
Whitehorse	Willard "Deacon" Phelps
