= 1917 Yukon general election =

Canadian territorial election

← 1915	March 15, 1917	1920 →

All 10 seats of the Yukon Territorial Council

The 1917 Yukon general election was held on March 15, 1917 to elect the ten members to the 4th Yukon Territorial Council. This election was contested between the Liberals and Conservatives.

The election was held using five two-member districts, where voters could cast two votes each.

== Campaign ==
The Liberals platform was primarily focused on improving working conditions, while the Conservative platform focused on infrastructure development. Both parties pledged to allow women to vote and stayed neutral on prohibition.

=== Liberal platform ===
The Liberals campaigned on a platform of "progressive legislation". They pledged to introduce if elected to bring in woman's suffrage, reducing public works employee work days to 8 hours a day without reducing wages, a new workers compensation act, a pledge to experiment with farming in the Yukon and lowering the cost of medical services and legal fees.

In addition to powers covered under territorial jurisdiction, the party pledged to lobby the federal government to put an exemption limit of $1000.00 for royalty payments paid by prospectors and miners. They planned to do this by establishing a memorial to send prayers to Ottawa. The party also decided to take no stand on the question of liquor prohibition which had been voted on a few months prior to the election.

=== Conservative platform ===
The Yukon Territorial Conservative Association pledged to bring in woman's suffrage, establish an old people's home, limit the time that mining claims can be registered under the Yukon Placer Mining Act and establish a road network, and wireless telegraph network with rural Yukon and southern Canada. The Conservatives also took a neutral stance regarding the question of prohibition.

== Results ==
- Bonanza - John Turner, Allen Angus McMillan
- Klondike - William Campbell Lowden, James Singleton Wilson
- North Dawson - William O'Brien, Maxime Landreville
- South Dawson - James Austin Fraser, Maxwell Charles Salter
- Whitehorse - Willard "Deacon" Phelps, Charles Henry Johnston
