= 1955 Yukon general election =

Canadian territorial election

← 1952	September 28, 1955	1958 →

All 5 seats of the Yukon Territorial Council

The 1955 Yukon general election was held on 28 September 1955 to elect the five members of the Yukon Territorial Council. The council was non-partisan and had merely an advisory role to the federally appointed Commissioner.

== Members elected ==
District	Member	Notes
Carmacks-Kluane	Alexander Hayes	Speaker of the Council
Dawson	Vincent Mellor	
Mayo	Duncan McGeachy	
Whitehorse East	John Phelps	
Whitehorse West	Jack Hulland	
