= 3rd Yukon Territorial Council =

Legislature of Yukon, Canada, 1915–1917

The 3rd Yukon Territorial Council was in session from 1915 to 1917. Membership was set by a general election held in 1915. The Council was non-partisan and had merely an advisory role to the federally appointed Commissioner.

== Members elected ==
District	Member	First elected / previously elected	No. of terms	Notes
Bonanza	John Turner	1915	1st term	
Bonanza	George Williams	1912	2nd term	
Klondike	Archie Martin	1915	1st term	Speaker of the Council
Klondike	John McCrimmon	1915	1st term	
North Dawson	William O'Brien	1915	1st term	
North Dawson	Joseph Guite	1915	1st term	
South Dawson	William G. Radford	1915	1st term	
South Dawson	Norman Watt	1915	1st term	
Whitehorse	Willard "Deacon" Phelps	1909	3rd term	
Whitehorse	Edward Dixon	1915	1st term	
