= 1952 Yukon general election =

Canadian territorial election

← 1949	August 20, 1952	1955 →

All 5 seats of the Yukon Territorial Council

The 1952 Yukon general election was held on 20 August 1952 to elect the five members of the Yukon Territorial Council. The council was non-partisan, and worked on the basis of consensus government.

== Members ==
District	Member	Notes
Carmacks-Kluane	Alexander Hayes	Speaker of the Council
Dawson	Vincent Mellor	
Mayo	Alex Berry	
Whitehorse East	John Phelps	
Whitehorse West	Fred Locke	
