= 1958 Yukon general election =

Canadian territorial election

← 1955	September 8, 1958	1961 →

All 5 seats of the Yukon Territorial Council

The 1958 Yukon general election was held on 8 September 1958 to elect the five members of the Yukon Territorial Council. The council was non-partisan and had merely an advisory role to the federally appointed Commissioner.

== Members elected ==
District	Member	Notes
Carmacks-Kluane	John Livesey	Speaker of the Council
Dawson	George Shaw	
Mayo	Ray McKamey	
Whitehorse East	Charles Drury Taylor	
Whitehorse West	James Smith	
