= 20th Yukon Territorial Council =

The 20th Yukon Territorial Council was in session from 1964 to 1967. Membership was set by a general election held in 1964. The council was non-partisan and had merely an advisory role to the federally appointed Commissioner.

== Members elected ==
District	Member	First elected / previously elected	No. of terms	Notes
Carmacks-Kluane	Bob MacKinnon	1964	1st term	
Dawson	George Shaw	1958	3rd term	Speaker of the Council
Mayo	Fred Southam	1964	1st term	
Watson Lake	Don Taylor	1961	2nd term	
Whitehorse East	Herbert Boyd	1962	2nd term	
Whitehorse North	Ken Thompson	1964	1st term	
Whitehorse West	John Watt	1961	2nd term	
