= 1925 Yukon general election =

Canadian territorial election

← 1922	September 7, 1925	1928 →

All 3 seats of the Yukon Territorial Council

The 1925 Yukon general election was held on 7 September 1925 to elect the three members of the Yukon Territorial Council. The council was non-partisan and had merely an advisory role to the federally appointed Commissioner.

== Members elected ==
- Dawson - Charles Bossuyt
- Klondike - Andrew Taddie
- Whitehorse - Robert Lowe

Robert Lowe stepped down from the council shortly after the election to run in the 1925 federal election. Willard "Deacon" Phelps was acclaimed to the vacant seat.
