= 1931 Yukon general election =

Canadian territorial election

← 1928	August 10, 1931	1934 →

All 3 seats of the Yukon Territorial Council

The 1931 Yukon general election was held on 10 August 1931 to elect the three members of the Yukon Territorial Council. The council was non-partisan and had merely an advisory role to the federally appointed Commissioner.

== Members ==
- Dawson - Andrew Taddie
- Mayo - Thomas MacKay
- Whitehorse - Willard "Deacon" Phelps
