= 1905 Yukon general election =

Canadian territorial election

← 1903	April 12, 1905	1907 →

All 5 elected seats of the Yukon Territorial Council

The 1905 Yukon general election was held on 12 April 1905 to elect five of the ten members of the Yukon Territorial Council.

The other five members were appointed.

== Members elected ==
District	Member elected
Bonanza	Richard Gillespie
Klondike	George Black
North Dawson	Henry Macauley
South Dawson	Thomas O'Brien
Whitehorse	Robert Lowe
