= 1940 Yukon general election =

Canadian territorial election

← 1937	November 25, 1940	1944 →

All 3 seats of the Yukon Territorial Council

The 1940 Yukon general election was held on 25 November 1940 to elect the three members of the Yukon Territorial Council.

== Yukon Territorial Council ==
The council was non-partisan, and had merely an advisory role to the federally appointed Commissioner.

== Members ==
- Dawson - Andrew Taddie
- Mayo - Richard Lee
- Whitehorse - Willard "Deacon" Phelps
