= 1947 Yukon general election =

Canadian territorial election

← 1944	February 13, 1947	1949 →

All 3 seats of the Yukon Territorial Council

The 1947 Yukon general election was held on 13 February 1947 to elect the three members of the Yukon Territorial Council. The council was non-partisan and had merely an advisory role to the federally appointed Commissioner.

== Members ==
- Dawson - John Fraser
- Mayo - Ernest Corp
- Whitehorse - Richard Lee
