= 1937 Yukon general election =

Canadian territorial election

← 1934	August 27, 1937	1940 →

All 3 seats of the Yukon Territorial Council

The 1937 Yukon general election was held on 27 August 1937 to elect the three members of the Yukon Territorial Council. The council was non-partisan and had merely an advisory role to the federally appointed Commissioner.

== Members ==
- Dawson - John MacDonald
- Mayo - Ernest Corp
- Whitehorse - George Wilson
