= 1949 Yukon general election =

Canadian territorial election

← 1947	July 25, 1949	1952 →

All 3 seats of the Yukon Territorial Council

The 1949 Yukon general election was held on 25 July 1949 to elect the three members of the Yukon Territorial Council. The council was non-partisan and had merely an advisory role to the federally appointed Commissioner.

== Members ==
- Dawson - Charles Lelievre
- Mayo - Ernest Corp
- Whitehorse - Richard Lee
