= 1915 Yukon general election =

Canadian territorial election

- March 4, 1915

All 10 seats of the Yukon Territorial Council

The 1915 Yukon general election was held on March 4 to elect the ten members of the Yukon Territorial Council. The members were chosen from five different electoral districts with the two most popular winning seats Plurality block voting.

== Members elected ==
District	Member elected
Bonanza	John Turner
Bonanza	George Williams
Klondike	Archie Martin
Klondike	John McCrimmon
North Dawson	William O'Brien
North Dawson	Joseph Guite
South Dawson	William G. Radford
South Dawson	Norman Watt
Whitehorse	Edward Dixon
Whitehorse	Willard "Deacon" Phelps
