= 1934 Yukon general election =

Canadian territorial election

← 1931	September 17, 1934	1937 →

All 3 seats of the Yukon Territorial Council

The 1934 Yukon general election was held on 17 September 1934 to elect the three members of the Yukon Territorial Council for Yukon, Canada. The council was non-partisan and had merely an advisory role to the federally appointed Commissioner.

== Members ==
- Dawson - Andrew Taddie
- Mayo - Ernest Corp
- Whitehorse - Charles Thomas Atherton
