= 21st Yukon Territorial Council =

Legislature of Yukon, Canada, 1967–1970

The 21st Yukon Territorial Council was in session from 1967 to 1970. Membership was set by a general election held in 1967. The council was non-partisan and had merely an advisory role to the federally appointed Commissioner.

== Members elected ==
District	Member	First elected / previously elected	No. of terms	Notes
Carmacks-Kluane	John Livesey	1958, 1967	3rd term*	Speaker of the Council
Dawson	George Shaw	1958	4th term	
Mayo	Jean Gordon	1967	1st term	First woman ever elected to the council.
Watson Lake	Don Taylor	1961	3rd term	
Whitehorse East	Norman Chamberlist	1961, 1967	2nd term*	
Whitehorse North	Ken McKinnon	1961, 1967	2nd term*	
Whitehorse West	John Dumas	1967	1st term	
