= 1928 Yukon general election =

Canadian territorial election

← 1925	July 16, 1928	1931 →

All 3 seats of the Yukon Territorial Council

The 1928 Yukon general election was held on 16 July 1928 to elect the three members of the Yukon Territorial Council. The council was non-partisan and had merely an advisory role to the federally appointed Commissioner.

== Members ==
- Dawson - Andrew Taddie
- Mayo - Frank Carscallen
- Whitehorse - Willard "Deacon" Phelps
