= 1944 Yukon general election =

Canadian territorial election

← 1940	February 9, 1944	1947 →

All 3 seats of the Yukon Territorial Council

The 1944 Yukon general election was held on 9 February 1944 to elect the three members of the Yukon Territorial Council. The council was non-partisan and had merely an advisory role to the federally appointed Commissioner.

== Members ==
- Dawson - John Fraser
- Mayo - Ernest Corp
- Whitehorse - Alexander Smith
