= 1907 Yukon general election =

Canadian territorial election

- April 16, 1907

All 5 elected seats of the Yukon Territorial Council

The 1907 Yukon general election was held on 16 April 1907 to elect five of the ten members of the Yukon Territorial Council.

== Members elected ==
District	Member elected
Bonanza	Thomas Kearney
Klondike	George Black
North Dawson	Joseph Lachapelle
South Dawson	John Grant
Whitehorse	Robert Lowe
