= 18th Yukon Territorial Council =

The 18th Yukon Territorial Council was in session from 1958 to 1961. Membership was set by a general election held in 1958. The council was non-partisan and had merely an advisory role to the federally appointed Commissioner.

== Members elected ==
District	Member	First elected / previously elected	No. of terms	Notes
Carmacks-Kluane	John Livesey	1958	1st term	Speaker of the Council
Dawson	George Shaw	1958	1st term	
Mayo	Ray McKamey	1958	1st term	
Whitehorse East	Charles Drury Taylor	1958	1st term	
Whitehorse West	James Smith	1958	1st term	
