= 12th Yukon Territorial Council =

The 12th Yukon Territorial Council was in session from 1940 to 1944. Membership was set by a general election held in 1940. The council was non-partisan and had merely an advisory role to the federally appointed Commissioner.

== Members elected ==
District	Member	First elected / previously elected	No. of terms	Notes
Dawson	Andrew Taddie	1925, 1940	5th term*	
Mayo	Richard Lee	1940	1st term	Speaker of the Council
Whitehorse	Willard "Deacon" Phelps	1909, 1926, 1940	9th term*	
