= 17th Yukon Territorial Council =

The 17th Yukon Territorial Council was in session from 1955 to 1958. Membership was set by a general election held in 1955. The council was non-partisan and had merely an advisory role to the federally appointed Commissioner.

== Members elected ==
District	Member	First elected / previously elected	No. of terms	Notes
Carmacks-Kluane	Alexander Hayes	1952	2nd term	Speaker of the Council
Dawson	Vincent Mellor	1952	2nd term	
Mayo	Duncan McGeachy	1955	1st term	
Whitehorse East	John Phelps	1952	2nd term	
Whitehorse West	Jack Hulland	1955	1st term	
