= 9th Yukon Territorial Council =

Legislature of Yukon, Canada, 1931–1934

The 9th Yukon Territorial Council was in session from 1931 to 1934. Membership was set by a general election held in 1931. The Council was non-partisan and had merely an advisory role to the federally appointed Commissioner.

== Members elected ==
District	Member	First elected / previously elected	No. of terms	Notes
Dawson	Andrew Taddie	1925	3rd term	Speaker of the Council
Mayo	Thomas MacKay	1931	1st term	
Whitehorse	Willard "Deacon" Phelps	1909, 1926	8th term*	
