= 7th Yukon Territorial Council =

Legislature of Yukon, Canada, 1925–1928

The 4th Yukon Territorial Council was in session from 1925 to 1928. Membership was set by a general election held in 1925. The Council was non-partisan and had merely an advisory role to the federally appointed Commissioner.

== Members elected ==
District	Member	First elected / previously elected	No. of terms	Notes
Dawson	Charles Bossuyt	1925	1st term	Speaker of the Council
Klondike	Andrew Taddie	1925	1st term	
Whitehorse	Robert Lowe	1909, 1920	7th term*	
Whitehorse	Willard "Deacon" Phelps (1926)	1909, 1926	6th term*	
