= 16th Yukon Territorial Council =

Yukon Territorial Council session, 1952–1955

The 16th Yukon Territorial Council was in session from 1952 to 1955. Membership was set by a general election held in 1952. The council was non-partisan and had merely an advisory role to the federally appointed Commissioner.

== Members elected ==
District	Member	First elected / previously elected	No. of terms	Notes
Carmacks-Kluane	Alexander Hayes	1952	1st term	Speaker of the Council
Dawson	Vincent Mellor	1952	1st term	
Mayo	Alex Berry	1952	1st term	
Whitehorse East	John Phelps	1952	1st term	
Whitehorse West	Fred Locke	1952	1st term	
