= Tatchun (electoral district) =

Former territorial electoral district in the Yukon, Canada

Yukon electoral district

Defunct territorial electoral district
- Legislature: Yukon Legislative Assembly
- District created: 1978
- District abolished: 1992
- First contested: 1978
- Last contested: 1989

Demographics
- Electors (1989): 418
- Census subdivision(s): Carmacks, Pelly Crossing, Little Salmon

Tatchun was an electoral district which returned an MLA to the Legislative Assembly of the Yukon Territory in Canada. It was created in 1978 out of the ridings of Klondike and Pelly River. It was abolished in 1992 when it was amalgamated with the riding of Mayo to form the riding of Mayo-Tatchun.

The district included the communities of Carmacks, Pelly Crossing, and Little Salmon. It was situated on the historical territory of the Selkirk First Nation, the First Nation of Na-Cho Nyäk Dun, the Little Salmon/Carmacks First Nation, and the Ross River Dena Council of the Kaska Dena. At creation, the population of the electorate was 325 voters and by abolition it was 418 voters.

When partisan politics was introduced to the Yukon in the 1978 election, Tatchun was one of the initial electoral districts established. At the time, it was one of the Yukon's nine rural ridings. It was bordered by the ridings of Mayo, Klondike, Faro, Kluane, Hootalinqua, and Campbell.

Tatchun is also the former seat of Roger Coles, leader of the Yukon Liberal Party from 1984 to 1986. He later resigned both his seat and his position as leader after being sentenced to prison time for cocaine trafficking.

== MLAs ==
Legislature	Years	Member	Party
24th	1978–1982	Howard Tracey	Progressive Conservative
25th	1982–1985	Howard Tracey	Progressive Conservative
26th	1985–1986	Roger Coles	Liberal
26th	1986–1987		Vacant
26th	1987–1989	Danny Joe	New Democratic
27th	1989–1992	Danny Joe	New Democratic

== Electoral results ==
=== 1989 ===
1989 Yukon general election
Party	Candidate	Votes	%	±%
NDP	Danny Joe	165	47.8%	+6.6%
Progressive Conservative	Paul Nieman	108	31.3%	+6.2%
Liberal	Luke Lacasse	71	20.6%	-10.3%
Total		345	100.0%	–

=== 1987 by-election ===
By-election: 1987
Party	Candidate	Votes	%	±%
NDP	Danny Joe	149	41.2%	+7.1%
Liberal	Elijah Smith	112	30.9%	-10.5%
Progressive Conservative	Pete Berry	91	25.1%	+6.6%
Independent	Ray A. Jackson	8	2.2%	+2.2%
Total		362	100.0%	–

- On the resignation of Roger Coles.

=== 1985 ===
1985 Yukon general election
Party	Candidate	Votes	%	±%
Liberal	Roger Coles	159	41.4%	+8.6%
NDP	Victor Mitander	131	34.1%	+1.9%
Progressive Conservative	Howard Tracey	93	18.5%	-15.3%
Total		384	100.0%	–

=== 1982 ===
1982 Yukon general election
Party	Candidate	Votes	%	±%
Progressive Conservative	Howard Tracey	106	33.8%	-7.5%
Liberal	Roger Coles	103	32.8%	-5.9%
NDP	Bill Larson	101	32.2%	+0.8%
Total		314	100.0%	–

=== 1978 ===
1978 Yukon general election
Party	Candidate	Votes	%	±%
Progressive Conservative	Howard Tracey	109	41.3%	–
NDP	Jerry Roberts	83	31.4%	–
Liberal	Hugh Netzel	71	26.9%	–
Total		264	100.0%	–

== See also ==
- List of Yukon territorial electoral districts
- Canadian provincial electoral districts
