= 8th Yukon Territorial Council =

Legislature of Yukon, Canada, 1928–1931

The 8th Yukon Territorial Council was in session from 1928 to 1931. Membership was set by a general election held in 1928. The Council was non-partisan and had merely an advisory role to the federally appointed Commissioner.

== Members elected ==
District	Member	First elected / previously elected	No. of terms	Notes
Dawson	Andrew Taddie	1925	2nd term	
Mayo	Frank Carscallen	1928	1st term	Speaker of the Council
Whitehorse	Willard "Deacon" Phelps	1909, 1926	7th term*	
