= Wade Istchenko =

Canadian politician

The Honourable Wade Istchenko MLA

Minister of Environment
- Incumbent
- Assumed office November 22, 2025
- Premier: Currie Dixon
- Preceded by: Nils Clarke

Member of the Yukon Legislative Assembly for Kluane
- Incumbent
- Assumed office October 11, 2011
- Preceded by: Gary McRobb

Minister of the Environment
- In office January 16, 2015 – December 3, 2016
- Preceded by: Currie Dixon
- Succeeded by: Pauline Frost

Minister of Highways and Public Works
- In office November 5, 2011 – January 16, 2015
- Preceded by: Archie Lang
- Succeeded by: Scott Kent

Personal details
- Party: Yukon Party

Wade Istchenko is a Canadian politician, who was elected to in the Yukon Legislative Assembly in the 2011, 2016 and 2021 elections. A former cabinet minister, he currently represents the rural Yukon district of Kluane as a member of the opposition Yukon Party caucus.

== Political career ==
=== 33rd Assembly ===
Istchenko was elected in November 2011 as a member of the Yukon Party caucus in the rural Yukon riding of Kluane. The riding had been held since 1996 by long-time New Democrat-turned-Liberal Gary McRobb, who had retired that year. Istchenko was sworn in as a member of the Executive Council (Cabinet) of Premier Darrell Pasloski on November 5, 2011, and served as Minister of Highways and Public Works until being appointed Minister of Environment in January 2015. During the 33rd Legislative Assembly, he also served as a member of the Standing Committee on Statutory Instruments.

Shortly before being sworn into Cabinet, Istchenko made headlines when he admitted to falsifying documents in 2008 to obtain a wilderness tourism operator permit. He apologized, and cited the incident as a lapse in judgment and admitted to paying a fine.

Istchenko once again drew controversy in 2015, this time after a photo emerged of him drinking a beer while in the driver's seat of a parked all-terrain vehicle. He later apologized for the incident.

=== 34th Assembly ===
Istchenko was re-elected in the 2016 Yukon election for the district of Kluane, defeating former Kluane First Nation chief and Liberal candidate Mathieya Alatini. The Yukon Party was defeated by the Yukon Liberal Party in that election, however, so Istchenko returned to the legislature as a member of the Opposition. He is currently the Yukon Party caucus critic for the Department of Environment, the Yukon Housing Corporation, the Yukon Liquor Corporation (including the Yukon Lottery Commission), the Yukon Energy Corporation and the Yukon Development Corporation. He is also a member of the Standing Committee on Public Accounts.

=== 35th Assembly ===
In May 2021, he apologized after inappropriate text messages that she made about NDP leader Kate White and Liberal leader Sandy Silver were made public. In the 35th Legislature of Yukon, Istchenko served as the Official Opposition critic for Environment and Rural Services.

== Personal life ==
Istchenko was born in Whitehorse and raised in Haines Junction, where he currently lives. He is a veteran of the Canadian Armed Forces, which he joined in 1984, and served with NATO in Germany. He continues to be active in the Canadian Rangers as a Ranger Sergeant.

Prior to entering the politics, Istchenko ran an outdoor adventure company, Kluane Ridin' Adventure Tours. He also served on the Kluane Park Management Board.

Istchenko is the grandson of Hilda Watson, former MLA for the same electoral district of Kluane, and the first woman to lead a political party in Canada.

== Electoral record ==
=== 2025 general election ===
2025 Yukon general election: Kluane
Party	Candidate	Votes	%	±%
Yukon Party	Wade Istchenko	435	56.06	+11.05
New Democratic	John Vandermeer	341	43.94	+16.96
Total valid votes		776		
Total rejected ballots				
Turnout			62.73	
Eligible voters		1,237		
Yukon Party hold		Swing		–2.96
Source(s) "2025 General Election Official Results". Elections Yukon.

=== 2021 general election ===
2021 Yukon general election: Kluane
Party	Candidate	Votes	%	±%
Yukon Party	Wade Istchenko	352	45.01	+1.7%
Liberal	Luke Campbell	219	28	-9.1%
New Democratic	Dave Weir	211	26.98	+7.8%
Total valid votes		782		
Total rejected ballots				
Turnout				
Eligible voters				
Yukon Party hold		Swing		-8.51
Source(s) "Unofficial Election Results 2021". Elections Yukon.

=== 2016 general election ===
Kluane
Party	Candidate	Votes	%	±%
Yukon Party	Wade Istchenko	338	43.3%	+5.4%
Liberal	Mathieya Alatini	289	37.1%	+8.1%
NDP	Sally Wright	153	19.2%	-9.8%
Total		780	100.0%	–

=== 2011 general election ===
Kluane
Party	Candidate	Votes	%	±%
Yukon Party	Wade Istchenko	287	37.9%	+8.3%
NDP	Eric Stinson	220	29.0%	+15.2%
Liberal	Timothy Cant	219	28.9%	-24.4%
First Nations Party	Gerald Dickson	32	4.2%	+4.2%
Total		759	100.0%	–
