= Ronald Rivett =

Canadian politician (1918–1977)

Member of the Yukon Territorial Council
- In office 1970–1974
- Preceded by: Jean Gordon
- Succeeded by: Gordon McIntyre
- Constituency: Mayo

Speaker of the Yukon Territorial Council
- In office 1970–1974
- Preceded by: John Livesey
- Succeeded by: Donald Taylor

Personal details
- Born: 1918 Rio Tinto, Spain
- Died: August 7, 1977 (aged 59) Whitehorse, Yukon, Canada
- Party: None
- Occupation: bookkeeper

Ronald A. Rivett (1918 – August 7, 1977) was a Canadian politician who served on the Yukon Territorial Council from 1970 to 1974. He was elected in the 1970 Yukon general election for the district of Mayo, and served as speaker of the council during his term. He was a bookkeeper. On March 6, 1972, Rivett accepted the Yukon Territorial Mace as a gift from Governor General Roland Michener. Rivett died at a hospital in Whitehorse in 1977 at the age of 59.
