= 15th Yukon Territorial Council =

The 15th Yukon Territorial Council was in session from 1949 to 1952. Membership was set by a general election held in 1949. The council was non-partisan and had merely an advisory role to the federally appointed Commissioner.

== Members elected ==
District	Member	First elected / previously elected	No. of terms	Notes
Dawson	Charles Lelievre	1949	1st term	
Mayo	Ernest Corp	1934, 1944	5th term*	Speaker of the Council
Whitehorse	Richard Lee	1940, (Note: Mayo) 1947	3rd term*	
