= 13th Yukon Territorial Council =

The 13th Yukon Territorial Council was in session from 1944 to 1947. Membership was set by a general election held in 1944. The council was non-partisan and had merely an advisory role to the federally appointed Commissioner.

== Members elected ==
District	Member	First elected / previously elected	No. of terms	Notes
Dawson	John Fraser	1944	1st term	
Mayo	Ernest Corp	1934, 1944	3rd term*	Speaker of the Council
Whitehorse	Alexander Smith	1944	1st term	
