= 14th Yukon Territorial Council =

The 14th Yukon Territorial Council was in session from 1947 to 1949. Membership was set by a general election held in 1947. The council was non-partisan and had merely an advisory role to the federally appointed Commissioner.

== Members elected ==
District	Member	First elected / previously elected	No. of terms	Notes
Dawson	John Fraser	1944	2nd term	
Mayo	Ernest Corp	1934, 1944	4th term*	Speaker of the Council
Whitehorse	Richard Lee	1940, (Note: Mayo) 1947	2nd term*	
