= 11th Yukon Territorial Council =

The 11th Yukon Territorial Council was in session from 1937 to 1940. Membership was set by a general election held in 1937. The council was non-partisan and had merely an advisory role to the federally appointed Commissioner.

== Members elected ==
District	Member	First elected / previously elected	No. of terms	Notes
Dawson	John MacDonald	1937	1st term	
Mayo	Ernest Corp	1934	2nd term	Speaker of the Council
Whitehorse	George Wilson	1937	1st term	
