= Jack Grant =

Jack Grant may refer to:

- Jack Grant (footballer, born 1915) (1915–1983), Australian rules footballer
- Jack Grant (footballer, born 1883) (1883–1954), Australian rules footballer
- Jack Grant (rugby union) (born 1994), Australian rugby union footballer

== See also ==
- Jackie Grant (1907–1978), West Indian cricketer
- Jackie Grant (footballer) (1924–1999), English footballer
- Jackson Grant (born 2002), American basketball player
- John Grant (disambiguation)
