= Thomas McGuire (disambiguation) =

Thomas McGuire (1920–1945) was an American fighter ace.

Thomas or Tom McGuire may also refer to:

- Thomas Horace McGuire, Canadian judge
- Tom McGuire (baseball) (1892–1959), American baseball player
- Tom McGuire (actor) (1873–1954), English film actor
- Thomas McGuire (engineer), American engineer
