= Howard Tracey =

Canadian politician from Yukon (born 1937)

MLA for Tatchun
- In office 1978–1985
- Preceded by: first member
- Succeeded by: Roger Coles

Personal details
- Born: 1937 (age 88–89)
- Party: Progressive Conservative
- Occupation: hotelier

Howard Tracey (born 1937) is a former Canadian politician, who represented the electoral district of Tatchun as a member of the Yukon Progressive Conservative Party.

Prior to his election to the legislature, Tracey was the owner and operator of the Carmacks Hotel in Carmacks. He first ran for election to the Yukon Territorial Council in the district of Klondike in the 1974 Yukon general election, losing to Fred Berger.

Although in the 1974 election he opposed the introduction of political parties in the territory, after political parties were introduced he ran in the 1978 Yukon general election as a Progressive Conservative, winning election to the new Legislative Assembly of Yukon in Tatchun. He was appointed to the Executive Council of Yukon as minister of education, and was later assigned responsibility for tourism and economic development, but was forced to resign from cabinet in 1979 after refusing to place the hotel in a blind trust for compliance with conflict of interest regulations.

After the legislature revised its conflict of interest rules in 1981, Tracey was reappointed to cabinet with responsibility for justice, consumer and corporate affairs, government services and the Workers' Compensation Board.

He was reelected in the 1982 Yukon general election, winning over Roger Coles of the Yukon Liberal Party by just three votes, and returned to cabinet as minister for health and human resources, renewable resources, government services and public works.

In the 1985 Yukon general election, he was defeated by Coles.
