= John Livesey =

Canadian politician

Member of the Yukon Territorial Council
- In office 1958–1964
- Preceded by: Alexander Hayes
- Succeeded by: Bob MacKinnon
- Constituency: Carmacks-Kluane
- In office 1967–1970
- Preceded by: Bob MacKinnon
- Succeeded by: Hilda Watson
- Constituency: Carmacks-Kluane

Speaker of the Yukon Territorial Council
- In office 1958–1964
- Preceded by: Alexander Hayes
- Succeeded by: George Shaw
- In office 1967–1970
- Preceded by: George Shaw
- Succeeded by: Ronald Rivett

Personal details
- Born: John Ormrod Livesey; November 6, 1911 Manchester, England
- Died: September 12, 2005 (aged 93) Comox, British Columbia
- Occupation: shopkeeper

John Ormrod Livesey (November 6, 1911 – July 12, 2005) was a Canadian politician, who served on the Yukon Territorial Council from 1958 to 1964 and from 1967 to 1970. He represented the district of Carmacks-Kluane, and served as Speaker of the Council.

Born in Manchester, England, Livesey moved to Canada in his youth. After serving in the military during World War II he settled in Beaver Creek, Yukon, where he operated a general store with his wife Freda. He won election to his first term on the Yukon Territorial Council in the 1958 Yukon general election, and was named as speaker in October. In 1959 he presided over the official opening of the Yukon River Bridge at Carmacks. He was reelected to a second term in office in the 1961 Yukon general election, and to a second term as council speaker.

He was defeated by Bob MacKinnon in the 1964 Yukon general election. In 1965, he denied a rumour that he was planning to run as a Social Credit Party of Canada candidate in the 1965 Canadian federal election. Livesey defeated MacKinnon in the 1967 Yukon general election to reclaim the seat, and was again selected as speaker.

He was defeated by Hilda Watson in the 1970 Yukon general election.

In the subsequent 1974 Yukon general election he ran against Watson in the new district of Kluane, but was not successful. He then challenged the validity of Watson's election on the basis of allegations that 26 ineligible voters had cast ballots in the district; although it was impossible to determine which way the invalid votes had been cast, the result was in doubt because the number exceeded Watson's 17-vote margin of victory. Watson resigned the seat and recontested it in a by-election, in which Livesey ran as her main challenger; Watson won the by-election.

Livesey ran for office one more time in the 1978 Yukon general election, the territory's first conventionally partisan election to the new Legislative Assembly of Yukon, as an independent candidate in Kluane. He was not elected, as he and Watson both lost to Yukon Liberal Party candidate Alice McGuire.

Following Freda Livesey's death in 1979, John Livesey moved to Comox, British Columbia in 1983. He lived there until his death in 2005.
