= McRobb =

McRobb is a surname. Notable people with the surname include:

- Gary McRobb (born 1956), Canadian politician
- Will McRobb, American television and film writer
