= 10th Yukon Territorial Council =

The 10th Yukon Territorial Council was in session from 1934 to 1937. Membership was set by a general election held in 1934. The council was non-partisan and had merely an advisory role to the federally appointed Commissioner.

== Members elected ==
District	Member	First elected / previously elected	No. of terms	Notes
Dawson	Andrew Taddie	1925	4th term	Speaker of the Council
Mayo	Ernest Corp	1934	1st term	
Whitehorse	Charles Thomas Atherton	1934	1st term	
