= Kluane (electoral district) =

Territorial electoral district in the Yukon, Canada

Yukon electoral district
- Interactive map of riding boundaries

Territorial electoral district
- Legislature: Yukon Legislative Assembly
MLA
Wade Istchenko
Yukon Party
- First contested: 1974
- Last contested: 2025

Demographics
- Electors (2021): 1,050
- Census subdivision(s): Beaver Creek, Burwash Landing, Champagne Landing 10, Destruction Bay, Haines Junction, Ibex Valley (part), Kloo Lake, Klukshu, Macpherson-Grizzly Valley (part), Whitehorse, Unorganized (part), Yukon, Unorganized (part)

Kluane is a territorial electoral district of Yukon that has been represented in the Yukon Legislative Assembly since 1974.

The district was established in 1974, when the Yukon Territorial Council was expanded from seven to 12 members as a prelude to the creation of the new legislative assembly. It is named after Kluane National Park, which lies within the riding.

== Geography ==
As one of Yukon's eight rural ridings, Kluane represents all Yukon communities and residents along the Alaska Highway west of Whitehorse and south to Alaska. This includes the communities of Haines Junction, Burwash Landing, Destruction Bay, Beaver Creek, and Mendenhall, as well as parts of the Ibex and Macpherson-Grizzly valleys. It is situated on the traditional territory of the Kluane First Nation, the Champagne and Aishihik First Nations, the White River First Nation, the Selkirk First Nation, and the Little Salmon/Carmacks First Nation.

== Members of the Territorial Council / Legislative Assembly ==
Assembly	Years	Member	Party
Kluane
23rd	1974–1978	Hilda Watson	Independent
24th	1978–1982	Alice McGuire	Liberal
25th	1982–1985	Bill Brewster	Progressive Conservative
26th	1985–1989	Bill Brewster	Progressive Conservative
27th	1989–1991	Bill Brewster	Progressive Conservative
27th	1991–1992	Bill Brewster	Yukon Party
28th	1992–1996	Bill Brewster	Yukon Party
29th	1996–2000	Gary McRobb	New Democratic
30th	2000–2002	Gary McRobb	New Democratic
31st	2002–2006	Gary McRobb	New Democratic
32nd	2006–2011	Gary McRobb	Liberal
33rd	2011–2016	Wade Istchenko	Yukon Party
34th	2016–2021	Wade Istchenko	Yukon Party
35th	2021–2025	Wade Istchenko	Yukon Party
36th	2025–Present	Wade Istchenko	Yukon Party

== Electoral results ==
=== 2025 ===
2025 Yukon general election
** Preliminary results — Not yet official **
Party	Candidate	Votes	%	±%
Yukon Party	Wade Istchenko	435	56.1	
New Democratic	John Vandermeer	341	43.9	
Total valid votes		776		
Total rejected ballots				
Turnout				
Eligible voters				
Yukon Party hold		Swing		
Source(s) "Unofficial Election Results 2025". Elections Yukon.

=== 2021 ===
2021 Yukon general election
Party	Candidate	Votes	%	±%
Yukon Party	Wade Istchenko	352	45.01	+1.7%
Liberal	Luke Campbell	219	28	-9.1%
New Democratic	Dave Weir	211	26.98	+7.8%
Total valid votes		782		
Total rejected ballots				
Turnout				
Eligible voters				
Yukon Party hold		Swing		-8.51
Source(s) "Unofficial Election Results 2021". Elections Yukon.

=== 2016 ===
2016 Yukon general election
Party	Candidate	Votes	%	±%
Yukon Party	Wade Istchenko	338	43.3%	+5.4%
Liberal	Mathieya Alatini	289	37.1%	+8.1%
NDP	Sally Wright	153	19.2%	-9.8%
Total		780	100.0%	–

=== 2011 ===
2011 Yukon general election
Party	Candidate	Votes	%	±%
Yukon Party	Wade Istchenko	287	37.9%	+8.3%
NDP	Eric Stinson	220	29.0%	+15.2%
Liberal	Timothy Cant	219	28.9%	-24.4%
First Nations Party	Gerald Dickson	32	4.2%	+4.2%
Total		759	100.0%	–

=== 2006 ===
2006 Yukon general election
Party	Candidate	Votes	%	±%
Liberal	Gary McRobb	317	53.3%	+37.2%
Yukon Party	Jim Bowers	176	29.6%	+11.3%
New Democratic Party	Lillian Grubach-Hambrook	82	13.8%	-51.3%
Independent	Freddy Hutter	19	3.2%	+3.2%
Total		598	100.0%	–

=== 2002 ===
2002 Yukon general election
Party	Candidate	Votes	%	±%
New Democratic Party	Gary McRobb	442	65.1%	+11.1%
Yukon Party	Michael Crawshay	124	18.3%	-10.0%
Liberal	Paul Birkckel	109	16.1%	+0.7%
Total		679	100.0%	–

=== 2000 ===
2000 Yukon general election
Party	Candidate	Votes	%	±%
New Democratic Party	Gary McRobb	405	55.0%	+6.5%
Yukon Party	Charlie Eikland	208	28.3%	+9.1%
Liberal	Gerald Brown	113	15.4%	-8.2%
Total		736	100.0%	–

=== 1996 ===
1996 Yukon general election
Party	Candidate	Votes	%	±%
New Democratic Party	Gary McRobb	364	48.5%	+8.4%
Liberal	John Farynowski	177	23.6%	+23.6%
Yukon Party	Ollie Wirth	144	19.2%	-39.9%
Independent	Bonnie Lock	66	8.8%	+8.8%
Total		751	100.0%	–

=== 1992 ===
1992 Yukon general election
Party	Candidate	Votes	%	±%
Yukon Party	Bill Brewster	377	59.1%	+10.3%
NDP	Wolf Riedl	256	40.1%	-2.5%
Total		638	100.0%	–

- The Yukon Progressive Conservative Party re-branded itself as the Yukon Party before the 1992 election.

=== 1989 ===
1989 Yukon general election
Party	Candidate	Votes	%	±%
Progressive Conservative	Bill Brewster	210	48.8%	-10.7%
New Democratic Party	Ron Chambers	183	42.6%	+18.7%
Liberal	Bill Woolsey	37	8.6%	-7.3%
Total		430	100.0%	–

=== 1985 ===
1985 Yukon general election
Party	Candidate	Votes	%	±%
Progressive Conservative	Bill Brewster	237	59.7%	+6.5%
New Democratic Party	Scott Gilbert	95	23.9%	-19.4%
Liberal	Tony Stanevicus	63	15.9%	+12.1%
Total		397	100.0%	–

=== 1982 ===
1982 Yukon general election
Party	Candidate	Votes	%	±%
Progressive Conservative	Bill Brewster	241	53.2%	+14.6%
New Democratic Party	Dave Joe	196	43.3%	+43.3%
Liberal	Alice McGuire	16	3.5%	-44.8%
Total		453	100.0%	–

=== 1978 ===
1978 Yukon general election
Party	Candidate	Votes	%	±%
Liberal	Alice McGuire	188	48.3%	–
Progressive Conservative	Hilda Watson	150	38.6%	–
Independent	John Livesey	49	12.6%	–
Total		389	100.0%	–

- Partisan politics introduced into the territory

=== 1974 ===
1974 Yukon general election
Party	Candidate	Votes	%	±%
Independent	Hilda Watson	123	28.8%	–
Independent	John Livesey	106	24.8%	–
Independent	Bob MacKinnon	97	22.7%	–
Independent	Ray Jackson	57	13.3%	–
Independent	Jack Brewster	43	10.1%	–
Total		427	100.0%	–

== See also ==
- List of Yukon territorial electoral districts
- Canadian provincial electoral districts
