= 1920 Yukon general election =

Canadian territorial election

← 1917	February 25, 1920	1922 →

All 3 seats of the Yukon Territorial Council

The 1920 Yukon general election was held on February 25, 1920, to elect the three members of the Yukon Territorial Council. The number of councilors was reduced from ten in the previous election to three following the general decline in population since the Klondike Gold Rush. The council held an advisory role to the federally appointed Commissioner.

== Members elected ==
District	Member elected
Dawson	Paul S. Hogan
Klondike	Gavin Fowlie
Whitehorse	Robert Lowe
