= 6th Yukon Territorial Council =

Legislature of Yukon, Canada, 1922–1925

The 4th Yukon Territorial Council was in session from 1922 to 1925. Membership was set by a general election held in 1922. The Council was non-partisan and had merely an advisory role to the federally appointed Commissioner.

== Members elected ==
District	Member	First elected / previously elected	No. of terms	Notes
Dawson	William Kenneth Currie	1922	1st term	
Klondike	John Ferrell	1922	1st term	
Whitehorse	Robert Lowe	1909, 1920	6th term*	Speaker of the Council
