= 5th Yukon Territorial Council =

Legislature of Yukon, Canada, 1920–1922

The 4th Yukon Territorial Council was in session from 1920 to 1922. Membership was set by a general election held in 1920. The Council was non-partisan and had merely an advisory role to the federally appointed Commissioner.

== Members elected ==
District	Member	First elected / previously elected	No. of terms	Notes
Dawson	Paul S. Hogan	1920	1st term	
Klondike	Gavin Fowlie	1920	1st term	
Whitehorse	Robert Lowe	1903, 1920	5th term*	Speaker of the Council
