= John Grant of Freuchie =

John Grant of Freuchie may refer to:

- John Grant of Freuchie (d. 1622), Scottish landowner
- John Grant of Freuchie (died 1585), Scottish landowner

== See also ==
- John Grant (disambiguation)
