= List of Yukon territorial electoral districts =

Yukon territorial electoral districts are currently single member ridings that each elect one member to the Yukon Legislative Assembly.

== Current districts ==
These districts have been used since the 2025 Yukon general election.

Yukon Electoral Districts following the 2024 redistribution

Previous district	New district	Electors (2025)
Copperbelt North	Copperbelt North	2,141
Copperbelt South	Copperbelt South	2,067
Klondike	Klondike	1,963
Kluane	Kluane	1,237
Lake Laberge	Lake Laberge	2,097
Mount Lorne-Southern Lakes	Marsh Lake-Mount Lorne-Golden Horn	1,427
Mayo-Tatchun	Mayo-Tatchun	1,121
Mountainview	Mountainview	1,910
Porter Creek Centre	Porter Creek Centre	2,146
Porter Creek North	Porter Creek North	1,762
Porter Creek South	Porter Creek South	1,822
Riverdale North	Riverdale North	1,919
Riverdale South	Riverdale South	1,956
Pelly-Nisutlin	Southern Lakes	1,159
Takhini-Kopper King	Takhini	2,161
Vuntut Gwitchin	Vuntut Gwitchin	192
Watson Lake	Watson Lake-Ross River-Faro	1,770
	Whistle Bend North	1,450
	Whistle Bend South	1,381
Whitehorse Centre	Whitehorse Centre	2,155
Whitehorse West	Whitehorse West	2,126

== Defunct districts ==
- Bonanza (electoral district)
- Campbell (electoral district)
- Carmacks-Kluane
- Copperbelt (electoral district)
- Dawson (electoral district)
- Faro (electoral district)
- Hootalinqua (electoral district)
- Mayo (electoral district)
- McIntyre-Takhini
- Mount Lorne (electoral district)
- North Dawson (electoral district)
- Ogilvie (electoral district)
- Pelly-Nisutlin
- Pelly River (electoral district)
- Riverside (electoral district)
- Ross River-Southern Lakes
- South Dawson (electoral district)
- Tatchun (electoral district)
- Whitehorse (electoral district)
- Whitehorse East
- Whitehorse North
- Whitehorse North Centre
- Whitehorse Porter Creek
- Whitehorse Porter Creek West
- Whitehorse Riverdale
- Whitehorse South Centre
- Yukon Electoral District No. 1
- Yukon Electoral District No. 2

== See also ==
- Canadian provincial electoral districts
