= Martha Black =

Canadian politician (1866–1957)

Martha Louise Black
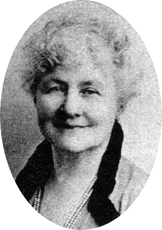

Member of the Canadian Parliament for Yukon
- In office 1935–1940
- Preceded by: George Black
- Succeeded by: George Black

Personal details
- Born: Martha Louise Munger; February 24, 1866 Chicago, Illinois, United States
- Died: October 31, 1957 (aged 91) Whitehorse, Yukon, Canada
- Party: Independent Conservative
- Spouses: Will Purdy (m. 1887) George Black (m. 1904)
- Children: 3, Warren, Donald and Lyman Purdy
- Education: Saint Mary's College

Martha Louise Munger Black OBE (February 24, 1866 – October 31, 1957) was a Canadian politician. Black was the second woman elected to the House of Commons of Canada.

== Biography ==
Black was born in on February 24, 1866 in Chicago, Illinois to George and Susan Munger. Of the five children her mother had over four years, Black was the only one to survive. She was followed by two younger siblings, George Jr. and Belle. Her father lost his laundry business in the Great Chicago Fire, but started over with great success, affording Black a comfortable, upper-class childhood. She was educated at Saint Mary's College in Indiana, a school operated by the Sisters of the Holy Cross.

Black married Will Purdy in 1887. Together the couple raised two sons, Warren and Donald. Black and Will made plans to join the Klondike Gold Rush in 1899, but Will backed out, departing instead for Hawaii. Black did not join Will in Hawaii, choosing to travel to the Klondike with her brother in 1898.

In 1898 she crossed the Chilkoot Pass into Canada, heading for the gold rush in the Klondike. She travelled with a party funded by her father and led by Captain Edward Spencer. The group, which included her brother George Jr. and cousin Harry Peachy, arrived in Dawson City by boat on August 5. They built a log cabin where she gave birth to her and Will's third son, Lyman, on January 31, 1899.

Black returned home to Chicago, and returned again to the Klondike in 1900. She earned a living by staking gold mining claims and running a sawmill and a gold ore-crushing plant.

In 1904, she married George Black, who later became Commissioner of the Yukon from 1912–1916 and Yukon MP.

== Political career ==
Black’s path to political life was an unusual one.

At the age of 69, she agreed to run for the Yukon seat in Canada's 1935 federal election, only because her husband, George Black, then the sitting Member of Parliament and former Speaker of the House of Commons of Canada, had suffered a nervous breakdown.

George was unable to campaign, but his former colleague and law partner, R. B. Bennett, had an idea. Bennett, then serving as prime minister, urged Black to run in his place.

Before agreeing, Martha turned to her father for his counsel. He said to her, "Daughter, you have the gift of gab. You might possibly succeed." Her decision was made and she put her name forward as an Independent Conservative, effectively campaigning in her husband's stead.

Black's campaign was no less unconventional than her entry into the political arena. The Yukon riding was vast and sparsely populated compared to any of the Canadian provinces. Its 1,805 registered voters were spread across more than 520,000 km² (200,000 sq mi). In her 1938 autobiography, she wrote that reaching the electorate required travel "by plane, row and motor boat, steamer, two-horse team and the old reliable shank's mare."

Black won the seat by 134 votes, becoming only the second woman ever elected to the House of Commons of Canada. Serving in the Official Opposition during the Liberal government of William Lyon Mackenzie King, she championed Yukon interests and supported early efforts toward what would become the Alaska Highway.

The end of Black’s brief parliamentary career was shaped by her husband’s health in much the same way as its beginning. This time, it was his recovery that set the next step in motion. In 1940, after five years of service, she stepped aside so that he could reclaim the Yukon seat. On his retirement in 1949, the couple settled permanently in the territory, later moving to Whitehorse in 1953.

== Legacy and death ==
She published an autobiography, My Seventy Years, in 1938. This work was subsequently updated and republished in her lifetime as My Ninety Years and later further updated posthumously and republished in 1998 as Martha Black: Her Story from the Dawson Gold Fields to the Halls of Parliament.

Black died October 31, 1957, in Whitehorse, at the age of 91. She was buried in the city's Pioneer Cemetery.

== Honours and awards ==
In 1917, Black was made a Fellow of the Royal Geographical Society for a series of nearly 400 lectures on the Yukon that she presented in Great Britain.

In 1946, she was made an Officer of Order of the British Empire for her cultural and social contributions to the Yukon.

In 1986, a Canadian Coast Guard high-endurance multi-tasked vessel was given the name "Martha L. Black" in her honour. The vessel sails in the Quebec Region area.

In 1997, Canada Post issued a $0.45 stamp in her honour.

Mount Martha Black in Yukon bears her name.

Black's legacy is also commemorated by a street in Whitehorse, named in her honour.

== Archives ==
There is a Martha Black fonds at Library and Archives Canada. Records related to Black are also held in Special Collections & Archives at the University of Waterloo as part of the Martha Louise Black fonds.
