= Bill Brewster (Canadian politician) =

Canadian politician

MLA for Kluane
- In office 1982–1996
- Preceded by: Alice McGuire
- Succeeded by: Gary McRobb

Personal details
- Born: William George Brewster; October 24, 1924 Banff, Alberta
- Died: November 13, 2014 (aged 90) Delburne, Alberta
- Party: Progressive Conservative → Yukon Party

William George Brewster (October 24, 1924 – November 13, 2014) was a Canadian politician, who represented the electoral district of Kluane in the Yukon Legislative Assembly from 1982 to 1996. He was a member of the Yukon Progressive Conservative Party until 1992, and the Yukon Party thereafter.

Prior to his election to the legislature, Brewster organized and coached minor league hockey in Haines Junction. A sports facility in the town has been named in his honour.

He died at the age of 90 in 2014.
