= Roger Coles =

Canadian politician (1958–2013)

MLA for Tatchun
- In office 1985 – October 31, 1986
- Preceded by: Howard Tracey
- Succeeded by: Danny Joe

Leader of the Yukon Liberal Party
- In office 1984 – May 9, 1986
- Preceded by: Ron Veale
- Succeeded by: Jim McLachlan

Personal details
- Born: September 19, 1958
- Died: June 28, 2013 (aged 54) Drayton Valley, Alberta, Canada
- Party: Liberal

Roger Coles (September 19, 1958 – June 24, 2013) was a Canadian politician, who represented the electoral district of Tatchun in the Yukon Legislative Assembly from 1985 to 1986. He was a member of the Yukon Liberal Party, and the party's leader from 1984 to 1986. He subsequently resigned his seat in the legislature on October 31 after pleading guilty to cocaine trafficking, and was sentenced to three years in prison. After which, he moved to Drayton valley where he succeeded making a profitable business with Century 21 selling real estate. He was the Co-owner as well as the broker. He owned and built businesses in Drayton Valley such as the first Dairy Queen in the town, and a music store.He later moved to Drayton Valley, Alberta, where he served on the municipal council. Roger Coles raised his 4 children, of which 3 have had offspring. He also had a wife. He was an announcer for the Drayton Valley Thunder, the hockey team, for awhile. He died on June 24, 2013, in Drayton Valley.
