= Johnny Grant =

Johnny Grant may refer to:

- Johnny Grant (radio personality) (1923–2008), American radio personality and television producer; honorary mayor of Hollywood
- Johnny Grant (politician), Republican Georgia State Senator representing the 25th district of Georgia
- Johnny Francis Grant, known as Johnny Grant, fur trapper and cattle baron, founder of what is now the Grant-Kohrs Ranch
- Jonathan Grant (born 1993), known as Johnny, Canadian soccer player

== See also ==
- John Grant (disambiguation)
