= Mount Martha Black =

Mountain in Yukon, Canada

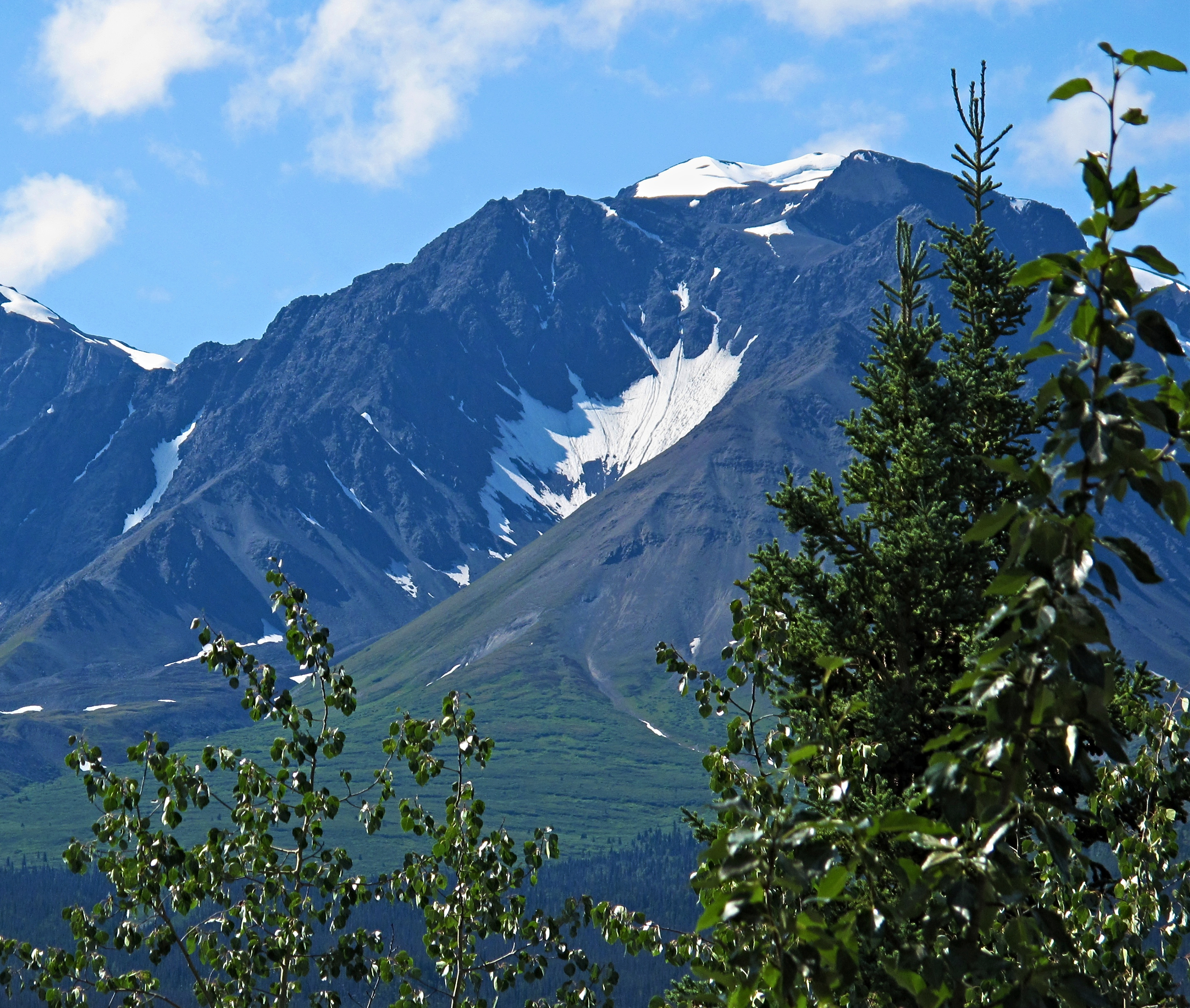
- Mount Martha Black

Highest point
- Elevation: 2,512 m (8,241 ft)
- Prominence: 1,797 m (5,896 ft)
- Parent peak: Alsek Peak (2716 m)
- Listing: Ultras of Canada 60th; Canada highest major peaks 124th
- Coordinates: 60°40′17″N 137°37′20″W

Naming
- Etymology: Martha Black

Geography
- Location within Yukon
- Location: Kluane National Park; Yukon, Canada
- Parent range: Auriol Range; Saint Elias Mountains
- Topo map: NTS 115A12 Auriol Range

Mount Martha Black, elevation 2,512-metre (8,241-foot), is the highest point in the Auriol Range of the Saint Elias Mountains in Yukon, Canada. The multi-summit massif is situated 11 km (7 mi) southwest of Haines Junction, 16 km (10 mi) northwest of Mount Worthington, and 18.6 km (12 mi) southeast of Mount Archibald, which is the nearest higher peak. Set within Kluane National Park, Mount Martha Black can be seen from the Alaska Highway, weather permitting. The mountain was named after Martha Black (1866-1957), the second woman elected to the House of Commons of Canada. The mountain's name was officially adopted August 12, 1980, by the Geographical Names Board of Canada.

== Climate ==
Based on the Köppen climate classification, Mount Martha Black is located in a subarctic climate zone with long, cold, snowy winters, and mild summers. The annual average temperature in the neighborhood is -6 °C. The warmest month is July, when the average temperature is 8 °C, and the coldest is December when temperatures can drop below −20 °C with wind chill factors below −30 °C. Precipitation runoff from the peak and meltwater from its surrounding glaciers drains into tributaries of the Alsek River.

== See also ==
- List of mountains of Canada
- Geography of Yukon
