= Yukon Electoral District No. 1 =

Former territorial electoral district in the Yukon, Canada

Yukon Electoral District No. 1 was a territorial electoral district in the Yukon Territory, Canada. The electoral district was created in 1903.

== Results ==
=== 1903 ===
1903 Yukon general election
Affiliation	Name	Vote	%
Opposition	Joseph Clarke	772	%
Government	Alfred Thompson	719	%
Unknown	C W. Tabor	560	%
Labor	George Gilbert	367	%
Opposition	Alex Prud'homme	320	%
Unknown	William Thornburn	80	%
Unknown	W.A. Bedoe	61	%
Total		2,879	100%

== See also ==
- List of Yukon territorial electoral districts
- Canadian provincial electoral districts
