= Danny Joe =

Canadian politician

Danny Joe OY

MLA for Tatchun
- In office 1987–1992
- Preceded by: Roger Coles
- Succeeded by: riding dissolved

MLA for Mayo-Tatchun
- In office 1992–1996
- Preceded by: first member
- Succeeded by: Eric Fairclough

Personal details
- Born: April 25, 1929 (age 96) Pelty Crossing, Yukon
- Party: New Democrat

Danny Joe OY is a former Canadian politician. He represented the electoral district of Tatchun from 1987 to 1992, and Mayo-Tatchun from 1992 to 1996, in the Yukon Legislative Assembly.

A member of the Yukon New Democratic Party, Joe was formerly a Chief of the Selkirk First Nation. He first won the riding in a by-election in 1987, following the resignation of Roger Coles, and was reelected in the 1989 election. He was subsequently re-elected in the redistricted Mayo-Tatchun in the 1992 election. He did not run again in 1996 and was replaced by Eric Fairclough who also won the riding for the NDP.

Joe was inducted as a member of the Order of Yukon in 2022 in recognition of his advocacy for First Nations culture and languages in the territory.
