= Norman Chamberlist =

Canadian politician

Member of the Yukon Territorial Council for Whitehorse East
- In office 1961–1961
- Preceded by: Charles Drury Taylor
- Succeeded by: Herbert Boyd
- In office 1967–1974
- Preceded by: Herbert Boyd
- Succeeded by: riding dissolved

Personal details
- Born: 1918
- Died: 2001 (aged 82–83)
- Occupation: electrical engineer, hotelier

Norman (Norm) Chamberlist (1918–2001) was a Canadian politician, who served on Whitehorse City Council and the Yukon Territorial Council.

First elected in the 1961 election, he was forced to resign the seat within a few months after a firm in which he was part owner won a contract from the council, placing Chamberlist in a conflict of interest. Herbert Boyd, the only candidate to file nomination papers when a by-election was called, was acclaimed to the seat in early 1962.

Chamberlist stood for office again in the 1967 election, and won election that year. In his speech on election night, he called on the Parliament of Canada to extend greater power to the territorial council. In 1968, he was an outspoken opponent of the city of Whitehorse installing parking meters, even hiring a lawyer to represent all citizens of the city in challenging their parking tickets.

Shortly before the 1970 election, Chamberlist opposed a federal government report on the Yukon, on the grounds that Canada had been granted administratorship rights over the territory but actual legal ownership still rested with the British Empire.

He was reelected in the 1970 election, and was one of the first two councillors to be appointed to the new executive committee. This gave him ministerial responsibilities over health and welfare in the territory. Chamberlist and his fellow executive councillor Hilda Watson built a voting bloc with two other non-executive councillors, which gave them effective control over virtually all council business. He was dropped from the executive committee in 1973, and was succeeded by Clive Tanner.

He did not run for reelection to the territorial council in the 1974 election, and moved to Vancouver, British Columbia. He was a British Columbia Liberal Party candidate in Vancouver East in that province's 1975 election, but did not win.

He died in 2001.
