= Gary McRobb =

Canadian politician (born 1956)

MLA for Kluane
- In office September 30, 1996 – October 11, 2011
- Preceded by: Bill Brewster
- Succeeded by: Wade Istchenko

Personal details
- Born: August 27, 1956 (age 70) New Westminster, British Columbia
- Party: NDP (1996–2006); Liberal (2006–2011)
- Occupation: Politician; Entrepreneur

Gary Douglas McRobb is a Canadian politician, who represented the rural Yukon electoral district of Kluane in the Yukon Legislative Assembly from 1996 to 2011.

== Political career ==
McRobb entered public life to protect Aishihik Lake from further hydroelectric projects. He was elected as a member of the incoming New Democrat government of Piers McDonald in the 1996 Yukon election. Though McRobb was not appointed to Cabinet, he was appointed Cabinet Commissioner for Energy, Mines and Resources in the McDonald administration. He also served as Deputy Speaker of the Yukon Legislative Assembly.

McRobb was re-elected as a member of the New Democrats in the 2000 and 2002 Yukon elections, and served as Opposition House Leader and New Democrat caucus critic for Tourism, Energy, Mines and Resources, Transportation, Information, and Communications, the Yukon Development Corporation, and the Yukon Energy Corporation.

In 2006, McRobb was expelled from the New Democrat caucus by then-leader Todd Hardy when it was discovered that McRobb and his colleague, Mayo-Tatchun MLA Eric Fairclough, had been publicly consulting constituents about considering quitting the New Democrats for the Liberals due to Hardy's isolated decision-making and a lack of faith in his leadership.

McRobb and Fairclough soon moved to the Liberal caucus, reducing Hardy's New Democrats to third party status and elevating the Yukon Liberal Party to Official Opposition. The move prompted the New Democrats to table legislation preventing MLAs from crossing the floor without an ensuing election, but the legislation was never adopted. McRobb and Fairclough were elected comfortably as Liberals in the 2006 election later that same year and the Liberals retained their Official Opposition status. Hardy's New Democrats remained the third party.

During the 32nd Assembly, McRobb served as the Opposition House Leader, as well as the Liberal critic for Energy, Mines and Resources, Highways and Public Works, and the Yukon Energy Corporation and the Yukon Development Corporation. As energy critic, he was outspoken against the governing Yukon Party's secretive efforts to privatize Yukon Energy in a sale to ATCO Electric. During his tenure in office, McRobb had developed a reputation of a political attack dog, who the media noted would "occasionally... over-reach, with accusations never quite substantiated in fact."

McRobb announced his decision to retire from politics prior to the 2011 election, citing that he had served enough time in elected office.

== Electoral record ==
=== Yukon general election, 2006 ===
Kluane
Party	Candidate	Votes	%	±%
Liberal	Gary McRobb	317	53.3	+37.2
Yukon Party	Jim Bowers	176	29.6	+11.3
New Democratic Party	Lillian Grubach-Hambrook	82	13.8	-51.3
Independent	Freddy Hutter	19	3.2	+3.2
Total		598	100	–

=== Yukon general election, 2002 ===
Kluane
Party	Candidate	Votes	%	±%
New Democratic Party	Gary McRobb	442	65.1	+11.1
Yukon Party	Michael Crawshay	124	18.3	-10.0
Liberal	Paul Birkckel	109	16.1	+0.7
Total		679	100	–

=== Yukon general election, 2000 ===
Kluane
Party	Candidate	Votes	%	±%
New Democratic Party	Gary McRobb	405	55.0	+6.5
Yukon Party	Charlie Eikland	208	28.3	+9.1
Liberal	Gerald Brown	113	15.4	-8.2
Total		736	100	–

=== Yukon general election, 1996 ===
Kluane
Party	Candidate	Votes	%	±%
New Democratic Party	Gary McRobb	364	48.5	+8.4
Liberal	John Farynowski	177	23.6	+23.6
Yukon Party	Ollie Wirth	144	19.2	-39.9
Independent	Bonnie Lock	66	8.8	+8.8
Total		751	100	–
