= Alice McGuire =

Canadian politician (1935–2021)

MLA for Kluane
- In office 1978–1982
- Preceded by: Hilda Watson
- Succeeded by: Bill Brewster

Personal details
- Born: April 1, 1935
- Died: December 9, 2021
- Party: Liberal
- Occupation: Politician

Alice McGuire (April 1, 1935 –December 9, 2021) was a Canadian politician. She represented the electoral district of Kluane in the Yukon Legislative Assembly from 1978 to 1982.

She defeated Yukon Progressive Conservative leader Hilda Watson in Kluane, despite the fact that the Progressive Conservatives won the election overall. McGuire's victory over Watson prevented Watson from becoming the first female head of government in a Canadian province or territory.

McGuire was a member of the Yukon Liberal Party.
