= Clive Tanner =

Canadian politician (1934–2022)

Member of the Yukon Territorial Council
- In office 1970–1974
- Preceded by: Ken McKinnon
- Succeeded by: riding redistributed
- Constituency: Whitehorse North

Member of the Legislative Assembly of British Columbia
- In office 1991–1996
- Preceded by: first member
- Succeeded by: Murray Coell
- Constituency: Saanich North and the Islands

Personal details
- Born: January 7, 1934 Edmonton, Middlesex, England
- Died: September 9, 2022 (aged 88) Sidney, British Columbia, Canada
- Party: British Columbia Liberal Party

Clive Tanner (January 7, 1934 – September 9, 2022) was a Canadian politician. He served in the Legislative Assembly of British Columbia from 1991 to 1996, as a British Columbia Liberal Party member for the constituency of Saanich North and the Islands.

Tanner previously lived in Yukon, where he was a member of the Yukon Territorial Council in the 1970s and served as Minister of Health. After the territory introduced partisan elections to the new Legislative Assembly of Yukon in 1977, Tanner ran as the Yukon Liberal Party candidate for Whitehorse Porter Creek West in the 1978 territorial election, but was not elected to the legislature.

He subsequently lived in Sidney, British Columbia, where he owned bookstores in Sidney and Victoria. He was an unsuccessful candidate in the 1986 BC provincial election. He was subsequently a candidate in the BC Liberal Party's 1987 leadership race to succeed Art Lee, but he withdrew from the race in August after sustaining a leg injury.

Tanner died on September 9, 2022, at his home in Sidney, aged 88.

== Electoral record ==
1991 British Columbia general election: Saanich North and the Islands
Party	Candidate	Votes	%
Liberal	Clive Tanner	13,633	52.53
New Democratic	Elsie McMurphy	8,745	33.70
Social Credit	Richard Holmes	2,917	11.24
Reform	Don Hutchings	557	2.15
Family Coalition	Thomas Aussenegg	99	0.38
Total valid votes		25,951	100.00
Total rejected ballots		307	1.17
Turnout		26,258	82.31
