= Yukon Electoral District No. 2 =

Former territorial electoral district in the Yukon, Canada

Yukon Electoral District No. 2 was a territorial electoral district in the Yukon Territory, Canada. The electoral district was created in 1903.

== Results ==
=== 1903 ===
1903 Yukon general election
Affiliation	Name	Vote	%
Unknown	John Pringle	719	%
Unknown	Maxime Landreville	656	%
Government	Arthur Wilson	594	%
Government	M. G. B. Henderson	387	%
Unknown	George White-Fraser	255	%
Unknown	McNamee	43	%
Total		2,654	100%

== See also ==
- List of Yukon territorial electoral districts
- Canadian provincial electoral districts
