= 1900 Yukon general election =

Canadian territorial election

October 18, 1900	1903 →

Both elected seats of the Yukon Territorial Council
	First party	Second party
Party	Yukon	Government
Seats won	2	0
Popular vote	2,460	1,407
Percentage	63.62%	36.38%

The 1900 Yukon general election was the first general election in the history of the Yukon territory held on October 18, 1900.

It elected members of the Yukon Territorial Council.

== Campaign ==
The six-member Yukon Territorial Council was expanded to eight by adding two elected members, to serve alongside the already-appointed ones. This was the smallest general election in Canadian history.

The election was held in a territory wide district, using Plurality block voting, with no constituencies. In total four candidates contested the election for the two seats—two Government candidates and two Yukon Party candidates.

== Election night ==
The official returns were read by appointed councilor Joseph Clarke.

== Results ==
Summary of the 1900 Yukon Territorial Council election results
Affiliation	Candidates	Elected members	Popular vote	
Affiliation	Candidates	Elected members	#	%
Yukon	2	2	2,460	63.62%
Government	2	0	1,407	36.38%
Total	4	2	3,867	100%

=== Vote total by candidates ===
Affiliation	Name	Votes	%
Yukon Party	Arthur Wilson	1,326	34.29%
Yukon Party	Alex Prud'homme	1,134	29.33%
Government	Thomas O'Brien	826	21.36%
Government	Auguste Noel	581	15.02%
Total		3,867	100%
