= 1903 Yukon general election =

Canadian territorial election

← 1900	January 13, 1903	1905 →

All 5 elected seats of the Yukon Territorial Council. Two members of unknown political affiliation were elected in District No. 2. Results in District 1 and Whitehorse:
	First party	Second party	Third party
Party	Government	Opposition	Labor
Seats won	2	1	0
Popular vote	2,460	1,407	367
Percentage	32.19%	18.70%	6.28%

The 1903 Yukon general election was held on January 13, 1903. The council was expanded to elect five of the ten members to the Yukon Territorial Council. The election was fought along party lines even though the council was limited in its powers and played an advisory role to the federally appointed Commissioner.

== Distribution ==
The Yukon was divided up into three electoral districts by the Yukon Territorial Council. The two rural districts were named Districts No. 1 and No 2. and each elected two members while Whitehorse became its own electoral district, electing just one.

After the election the validity of the election was called into question because the Yukon council might have overstepped its authority dividing up the Yukon into electoral districts.

== Results ==
Summary of the 1903 Yukon Territorial Council election results
Affiliation	Candidates	Elected members			Popular vote		
Affiliation	Candidates	1900	1903	Change	#	%	Change (pp)
Government	4	0	2	n/a	1,880	32.19%	n/a
Opposition	2	n/a	1	n/a	1,092	18.70%	n/a
Labor	1	n/a	0	n/a	367	6.28%	n/a
Unknown	9	n/a	2	n/a	2,501	42.83%	n/a
Total	16	2	5	5	5,840	100%	

=== Members elected ===
District	Member elected	Affiliation
District No. 1	Joseph Clarke	Opposition
District No. 1	Alfred Thompson	Government
District No. 2	John Pringle	Unknown
District No. 2	Maxime Landreville	Unknown
Whitehorse	Robert Lowe	Government
