= Jean Gordon (politician) =

Canadian politician (1918–2008)

Member of the Yukon Territorial Council
- In office 1967–1970
- Preceded by: Fred Southam
- Succeeded by: Ronald Rivett
- Constituency: Mayo

Personal details
- Born: Gertrude Jean Matheson; March 6, 1918 Vancouver, British Columbia
- Died: September 5, 2008 (aged 90)
- Occupation: journalist, accountant

Gertrude Jean Gordon (March 6, 1918 – September 5, 2008) was a Canadian politician. She was the first woman ever elected to the Yukon Territorial Council, serving from 1967 to 1970.

== Biography ==
Gordon was born in 1918 in Vancouver, British Columbia and grew up in the B.C. towns of Alice Arm and Stewart. She met Wilfred Gordon in Stewart and married him in 1937 when she was 19 years old; a year later they moved to Dawson City, Yukon. In Dawson City, the Gordons took up animal trapping and raised three bear cubs. They lived there until 1945, when they moved to Mayo, Yukon so that their young daughter could attend school and socialise with other children.

In Mayo, Gordon started volunteering: she was a secretary and treasurer for the Mayo Community Club, an accountant for the Mayo Community Theatre, and a columnist for the local newspaper, the Whitehorse Star. In 1967 she decided to run for election to the Yukon Territorial Council because of her concern for water and sewer systems in the local area. She was later quoted as saying that the main reason for her running was because "I couldn't keep my mouth shut". Her election campaign was successful, and she became the first woman ever elected to the council in its 59-year history. She sat on the council for three years, during which time she requested that the other (male) members call her Charlie to make it clear that "she expected no special treatment as a woman".

Gordon was not re-elected to the Yukon Territorial Council in 1970, so instead she completed a certificate in bookkeeping and took jobs with Canada Manpower, the Mayo post office, and established the Mayo Outreach Office. She also spent 20 years working for the Yukon Water Board and helped to coordinate the International Year of Older Persons in Yukon in 1999, which involved planting a birch tree for every senior citizen in Mayo. She died in 2008 in Mayo after a prolonged illness.
