= Jack Grant (footballer, born 1883) =

Australian rules footballer

Personal information
- Full name: John Arthur Grant
- Born: 29 May 1883; Collingwood, Victoria
- Died: 29 December 1954 (aged 71); Fitzroy, Victoria
- Original team: Carlton Juniors

Playing career^{1}
Years	Club	Games (Goals)
1906	Carlton	1 (1)
1908	St Kilda	1 (0)
Total		2 (1)
- ^{1} Playing statistics correct to the end of 1908.

Jack Grant (29 May 1883 – 29 December 1954) was an Australian rules footballer who played for the Carlton Football Club and St Kilda Football Club in the Victorian Football League (VFL).
