= Maxime Landreville =

Canadian politician

Maxime Landreville (1860–1938) was a Canadian politician, who served three non-consecutive terms as a member of the Yukon Territorial Council.

Originally from Saint-Paul, Quebec, Landreville moved to Yukon in 1895 to work as a miner. He settled in Dawson City, and in 1898 he was part of a delegation from the city who travelled to Ottawa to lobby for changes in federal mining regulation.

He was first elected to the territorial council in the 1903 Yukon general election to represent Yukon Electoral District No. 2. He served until 1905, and did not run for reelection in the 1905 Yukon general election.

In the 1909 Yukon general election he was elected from Klondike, again serving a single term until 1912; in the 1917 Yukon general election he was elected in North Dawson, serving until 1920.

In addition to his political career, he also served as a regional president of the Yukon Order of Pioneers in Dawson, and was a singer in the local church choir.
