= George Norris Williams =

Commissioner of Yukon

George Norris Williams (13 October 1866, Ōkaihau, New Zealand – 9 July 1949, Dawson City) was the acting commissioner of Yukon from 13 October 1916 to 1 April 1918, when the previous commissioner, George Black, was fighting in World War I. Before serving as the commissioner, he was an elected member of the Yukon Territorial Council. He was a member of the Yukon Order of Pioneers. His occupation was once listed as 'miner'.

In his career, he approved the Workers Compensation Ordinance , which protected Yukon workers.
