= 1922 Yukon general election =

Canadian territorial election

- September 11, 1922

All 3 seats of the Yukon Territorial Council

The 1922 Yukon general election was set to be held on September 11, 1922. The results of the election were known on August 12, 1922 when all three electoral districts returned members to the Yukon Territorial Council by acclamation. The Council played an advisory role to the federally appointed Commissioner.

== Elections results ==
No vote was held; the only three candidates that turned in nomination papers and deposits were returned by acclamation.

=== Members elected ===
District	Member elected
Dawson	William Kenneth Currie
Klondike	John Ferrell
Whitehorse	Robert Lowe
