= Hilda Watson =

Canadian politician

Leader of the Yukon Progressive Conservative Party
- In office 1978–1979
- Preceded by: first leader
- Succeeded by: Chris Pearson

Member of the Yukon Territorial Council
- In office 1970–1974
- Preceded by: John Livesey
- Succeeded by: district dissolved
- Constituency: Carmacks-Kluane

Member of the Yukon Territorial Council
- In office 1974–1978
- Preceded by: first member
- Succeeded by: Alice McGuire
- Constituency: Kluane

Personal details
- Born: January 13, 1922 Kuest, Saskatchewan
- Died: July 14, 1997 (aged 75) Yukon
- Party: Yukon PC Party

Hilda Pauline Watson (January 13, 1922 – July 14, 1997) was a Canadian schoolteacher and politician from the Yukon Territory. She was the first woman in Canadian history to lead a political party which was successful in having its members elected.

First elected to the Yukon Territorial Council in the 1970 election to represent the district of Carmacks-Kluane, she was one of the first two councillors to be appointed to the new executive committee. This gave her ministerial responsibilities over education in the territory. Watson and her fellow executive councillor Norman Chamberlist built a voting bloc with two other non-executive councillors, which gave them effective control over virtually all council business. In 1974, Watson survived a motion of no confidence brought against her for her handling of a student strike in Pelly Crossing.

Watson was reelected in the 1974 election, but the validity of her election was challenged in court by former executive councillor John Livesey on the basis of allegations that 26 ineligible voters had cast ballots in the district — although it was impossible to determine which way the invalid votes had been cast, the result was in doubt because the number exceeded the 17-vote margin between Watson and Livesey. Watson resigned the seat and recontested it in a by-election, in which Livesey ran as her main challenger; Watson won the by-election.

After the legislation authorizing the creation of the Legislative Assembly of Yukon, and the resulting establishment of political parties in the territory, was passed in 1977, Watson narrowly won the leadership of the new Progressive Conservative Party over federal Member of Parliament Erik Nielsen.

She led the party to victory in the 1978 territorial election, in which she was the party's candidate in the electoral district of Kluane. However, she lost her own seat to Liberal opponent Alice McGuire, and therefore did not become government leader. She was succeeded as leader of the party and of the government by Chris Pearson.
