= Frederick Tennyson Congdon =

Canadian politician

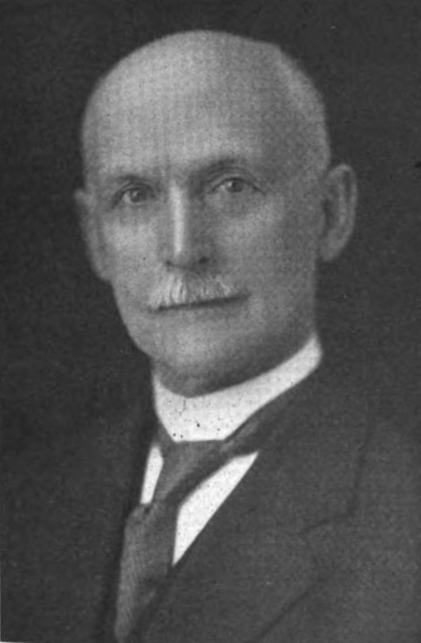

Member of the House of Commons of Canada
- In office 1908–1911
- Constituency: Yukon

Commissioner of Yukon
- In office 1903–1904
- Preceded by: James Hamilton Ross
- Succeeded by: William Wallace Burns McInnes

Personal details
- Born: November 16, 1858 Annapolis, Nova Scotia
- Died: March 13, 1932 (aged 73) Ottawa, Ontario
- Party: Liberal
- Spouse: Louisa Gladwyn (m. 1887; died 1930)
- Children: 2
- Education: University of Toronto; Inner Temple
- Occupation: Lawyer, politician

Frederick Tennyson Congdon (November 16, 1858 – March 13, 1932) was a Canadian politician, lawyer, and served as the fourth commissioner of Yukon.

== Biography ==
Congdon was born in Annapolis, Nova Scotia and attended Yarmouth High School. Following graduation, he received a Bachelor of Arts (BA) degree from the University of Toronto in 1879 and a Bachelor of Laws (LL.B.) degree in 1883. He then attended the Inner Temple in London to study law.

He was then an editorial writer for the Halifax Morning Chronicle between 1885 and 1887. In the latter year, he married Louisa Gladwyn. He then practised law and lectured at Dalhousie University. In 1898, he wrote Congdon's Digest of Nova Scotia Reports.

Around the turn of the 20th century, Congdon moved to the Yukon Territory to serve as Crown Prosecutor and legal advisor to the Yukon Council. In 1903, he was appointed Commissioner.

His term in office was not looked upon with a positive feeling and it was mired by corruption and controversy. He has also been blamed for the disincorporation of Dawson City in 1904.

Only a year after his appointment, Congdon resigned so he could win the Yukon's seat in the House of Commons of Canada, which had been recently vacated by former Yukon Commissioner James Hamilton Ross, who left his seat when he was appointed to the Senate of Canada. A loyal Liberal Party member, Congdon was defeated for the seat in Parliament.

However, he did not give up hope that he would sit in the House. He finally won the seat in 1908, but lost it in 1911. This would be the last and only time that Congdon would serve as Member of Parliament for the Yukon.

After 1921, following yet another defeat, Congdon practised law in Toronto. He went once more for the seat, in 1926, only to suffer his last defeat. He died in Ottawa on March 13, 1932.

Preceded by James Hamilton Ross	Commissioner of the Yukon; 1903–1904	Succeeded by William Wallace Burns McInnes

Preceded by Alfred Thompson	Member of Parliament for the Yukon; 1908–1911	Succeeded by Alfred Thompson
