= Thomas Horace McGuire =

Canadian judge

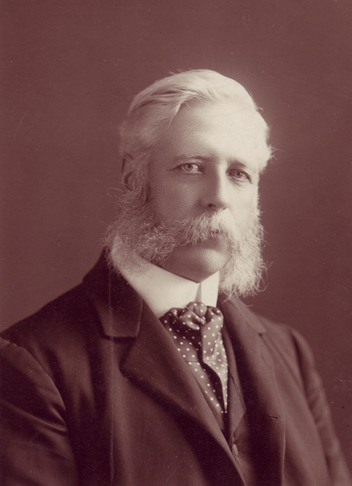
- McGuire between 1895 and 1907

Chief Justice of the Supreme Court of the Northwest Territories
- In office February 18, 1902 – January 3, 1903

Justice of the Supreme Court of the Northwest Territories
- In office April 4, 1887 – February 18, 1902

Personal details
- Born: April 21, 1849 Kingston, Ontario
- Died: July 13, 1923 (aged 74) Prince Albert, Saskatchewan
- Education: Queen's University

Thomas Horace McGuire (April 21, 1849 – July 13, 1923) was a Canadian judge.

Thomas Horace McGuire was born on April 21, 1849, in Kingston, Ontario. He attended Queen's University from 1866 to 1870, graduating with a Bachelor of Arts. McGuire was called to the bar of Ontario in 1875 and became a queen's counsel in 1883. Before his appointment to the bench, he practised law in Kingston.

He became a justice of the Supreme Court of the Northwest Territories on April 25, 1887, as a member of its first panel. He was named the first chief justice of the Northwest Territories on February 18, 1902 until his retirement one year later on January 3, 1903.

McGuire died on July 13, 1923, in Prince Albert, Saskatchewan.

== Sources ==
- Bowker, Wilbur F. (1988). "Stipendiary Magistrates and Supreme Court of the North-West Territories, 1876–1907". Alberta Law Review. 26 (2): 245–286. doi:10.29173/alr1653. 1988 CanLIIDocs 81.
