= Alfred Thompson (Yukon politician) =

Canadian physician and politician

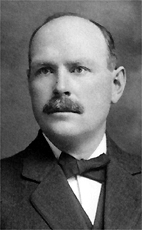
Alfred Thompson

Alfred Thompson (June 6, 1869 – April 20, 1940) was a Canadian physician and politician.

Born in Nine Mile River, Nova Scotia, the son of James A. Thompson and Jane Thompson, Thompson was educated at a public school by private tutor and graduated from Dalhousie University with a degree of M.D.C.M. in 1898. He went to the Klondike in 1899 where he practiced medicine. In 1902, he was elected to the Yukon Council. Thompson would go on to sit three times in the House of Commons of Canada, always representing the federal constituency of the Yukon.

A Conservative, he first sat in the House between 1904 and 1908, taking the seat away from his main rival, former Yukon Commissioner Frederick Tennyson Congdon. The seat had recently been vacated by another former Yukon Commissioner, James Hamilton Ross, because of his appointment to the Senate of Canada.

In 1908, Congdon finally received the seat, but Thompson won it back in 1911, and was re-elected in 1917, remaining the MP for Yukon until 1921, when he was succeeded by George Black, yet another Yukon Commissioner.

Parliament of Canada
Preceded by James Hamilton Ross	Member of Parliament for the Yukon; 1904–1908	Succeeded by Frederick Tennyson Congdon
Preceded by Frederick Tennyson Congdon	Member of Parliament for the Yukon; 1911–1921	Succeeded by George Black
