= John Grant =

John Grant may refer to:

== Entertainment ==
- John Grant (author) (1949–2020), pseudonym used by science fiction writer Paul Le Page Barnett
- John Grant (children's author) (1930–2014), Scottish writer and illustrator known for the Littlenose series
- John Grant (novelist) (born 1933), writes under the pen name Jonathan Gash
- John Grant (pipe-major) (1876–1961), Scottish bagpipe player
- John Grant (musician) (born 1968), singer-songwriter, lead vocalist with The Czars
- John Grant (screenwriter) (1891–1955), wrote for Abbott and Costello
- John Grant (born 1960), pseudonym Jock Strap, vocalist with London punk band The Straps
- John Moreau Grant (1895–1986), Canadian naval officer
- Johnny Grant (radio personality) (1923–2008), American radio personality
- John Grant, character in Action for Slander
- John Grant, character in Wake in Fright

== Military ==
- John Duncan Grant (1877–1967), British soldier
- John Gildroy Grant (1889–1970), New Zealand soldier
- John Robert Grant (1729–1790), British soldier, American Loyalist and the first British settler of Summerville, Nova Scotia
- John Grant (Royal Navy officer) (1908–1996), admiral who commanded the Reserve Fleet of the Royal Navy
- Johannes Grant, Scottish engineer who fought in the Siege of Constantinople

== Politics ==
- John Gaston Grant (1858–1923), U.S. Representative from North Carolina
- John Grant (British diplomat) (born 1954), British diplomat and head of the UK's Mission to the European Union
- John Grant (British politician) (1932–2000), British Labour and SDP Member of Parliament
- John Grant (Gunpowder Plot) (c. 1570–1606), one of the conspirators in the Gunpowder Plot
- John Grant (Manchester politician), Manchester councillor for Whalley Range
- John Grant (Australian politician) (1857–1928), Australian Senator
- John Grant (Queensland politician) (born 1954), member of the Legislative Assembly of Queensland from 2012 to 2015
- John Grant (Canadian politician) (1841–1919), Scottish-born merchant and political figure in British Columbia
- John Grant (Florida politician) (born 1943), American politician from Florida
- John Grant (d. 1804) (c.1720–1804), British Member of Parliament of the 1780s, nabob and banker
- John James Grant (born 1936), Lieutenant Governor of Nova Scotia
- John Peter Grant (MP) (1774–1848), Scottish politician
- John Grant, 13th Earl of Dysart (born 1946), Scottish peer, landowner and conservationist
- John Peter Grant (1807–1893), British colonial administrator

== Sports ==
- John Grant (footballer, born 1891), English
- Jack Grant (footballer, born 1915) (1915–1983), Australian rules footballer (John William Grant)
- Jackie Grant (footballer) (1924–1999), English footballer (John Albert Grant)
- John Grant (Scottish footballer) (1931–2021)
- John Grant (cricketer) (born 1941), Australian
- John Grant (American football) (born 1950)
- John Grant (rugby league) (born 1950), Australian
- John Grant Jr. (born 1974), Canadian lacrosse player
- John Grant (footballer, born 1981), English

== Other ==
- John Grant (priest) (fl. 1731–1744), Archdeacon of Barnstaple
- John Grant (neurosurgeon) (1922–2013), neurosurgeon and disability sport administrator
- John C. Boileau Grant (1886–1973), British-Canadian anatomist
- John Marion Grant (1961–2021), American convict executed in Oklahoma
- John T. Grant (1813–1887), American railroad builder
- John T. Grant (judge) (1920–2010), justice of the Nebraska Supreme Court.
- John W. Grant (1867–1938), Atlanta merchant and banker in the late 19th century

== See also ==
- Jack Grant (disambiguation)
- Johnny Grant (disambiguation)
- Johnson Grant (1773–1844), Scottish divine
