= Whitehorse North =

Former territorial electoral district in the Yukon, Canada

Whitehorse North was a territorial electoral district in the Canadian territory of Yukon, which was represented on the Yukon Territorial Council from 1961 to 1974. The district comprised the northern portion of the territorial capital, Whitehorse.

== Representatives ==
Name	Took office	Left office
Ken McKinnon	1961	1964
Ken Thompson	1964	1967
Ken McKinnon	1967	1970
Clive Tanner	1970	1974

== See also ==
- List of Yukon territorial electoral districts
- Canadian provincial electoral districts
