= Ken McKinnon (politician) =

Canadian politician (1936–2019)

Commissioner of Yukon
- In office March 27, 1986 – June 23, 1995
- Prime Minister: Brian Mulroney; Kim Campbell; Jean Chrétien
- Premier: Tony Penikett; John Ostashek
- Preceded by: Douglas Bell
- Succeeded by: Judy Gingell

Member of the Yukon Territorial Council for Whitehorse North Centre (Whitehorse West; 1970–1974) (Whitehorse North; 1967–1970; 1961–1964)
- In office September 11, 1967 – November 20, 1978
- Preceded by: Ken Thompson
- Succeeded by: Geoff Lattin (Legislative Assembly)
- In office September 11, 1961 – September 8, 1964
- Preceded by: Riding established
- Succeeded by: Ken Thompson

Personal details
- Born: John Kenneth McKinnon; April 20, 1936 Winnipeg, Manitoba, Canada
- Died: March 13, 2019 (aged 82) Whitehorse, Yukon, Canada
- Occupation: Businessman

John Kenneth McKinnon (April 20, 1936 – March 13, 2019) was a Canadian politician and the commissioner of Yukon from 1986 to 1995.

== Early life ==
The son of Alex McKinnon and Catherine Luce, he was educated in Norwood, at St. Paul's College and at the University of Manitoba. McKinnon married Judy S. Chenley. He was vice-president and general manager of Northern Television Services.

McKinnon was a Member of the Yukon Territorial Council from 1961 to 1964 and from 1967 to 1974. McKinnon was then appointed Minister of Local Government in 1974, Minister of Highways and Public Works in 1976. He was then Yukon Administrator of the Northern Pipeline Agency from 1979 to 1984 and appointed Commissioner March 27, 1986 then retired in June 1995. After his retirement, he ran in the 1997 Canadian federal election as Progressive Conservative, coming in fourth in the Yukon riding. McKinnon was chancellor of Yukon College from 2000 to 2004.

In 2007, he was named chair of the Yukon Environmental and Socio-Economic Assessment Board.

In March 2019, the Yukon legislature announced that McKinnon had died. He was 82.
