= George Black (Canadian politician) =

Canadian politician and lawyer (1873–1965)

The Honourable George Black PC KC
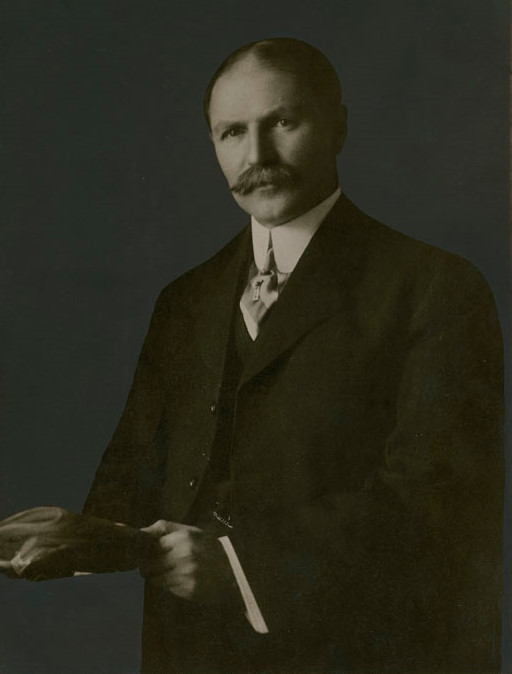

17th Speaker of the House of Commons of Canada
- In office September 8, 1930 – January 16, 1935
- Preceded by: Rodolphe Lemieux
- Succeeded by: James Langstaff Bowman

Commissioner of Yukon
- In office February 1, 1912 – April 1, 1918
- Preceded by: William Wallace Burns McInnes (1911)
- Succeeded by: George P. MacKenzie (as Gold Commissioner)

Member of the Canadian Parliament for Yukon
- In office March 26, 1940 – June 27, 1949
- Preceded by: Martha Black
- Succeeded by: James Aubrey Simmons
- In office December 6, 1921 – October 14, 1935
- Preceded by: Alfred Thompson
- Succeeded by: Martha Black

Personal details
- Born: April 10, 1873 Woodstock, New Brunswick, Canada
- Died: August 23, 1965 (aged 92)
- Party: Conservative

George Black PC (April 10, 1873 – August 23, 1965) was a Canadian politician and lawyer. A Conservative, he served as Yukon member of parliament from 1921 to 1935, and again from 1940 to 1949.

== Biography ==
Black went to Yukon in 1898 during the Gold Rush, accompanied by his older sister. He prospected and found gold, making a fortune but then losing it when a flood swept away his claim. He then established a law practice in Dawson City. He was elected to the Yukon Territorial Council in 1905. He ran for the House of Commons of Canada in the 1908 federal election but was defeated.

In the 1911 federal election, Black was H.H. Stevens' campaign manager, and was rewarded by the government of Robert Laird Borden by being appointed to the position of Commissioner of the Yukon. As the commissioner from 1912 to 1915, he tried to bring in legislation to protect miners, loggers and others who worked for companies that went bankrupt.

During World War I, Black recruited a regiment from the Yukon to fight in the war. He became the company's Captain, and was later wounded in combat at the Battle of Amiens. In his absence, George Norris Williams fulfilled his duties.

Following the war, Black settled in British Columbia in 1919, and ran unsuccessfully for a seat in the Legislative Assembly of British Columbia.

Black first won a seat in Parliament in the 1921 election as a Conservative, representing Yukon. As a Member of Parliament (MP), he introduced legislation to give Yukoners the right to trial by jury and to protect mining titles.

After the Tories won the 1930 election, the new Prime Minister of Canada, R.B. Bennett, nominated Black to be Speaker of the House of Commons of Canada. As Speaker, he kept a .22 caliber pistol in his chambers. With the gun he shot rabbits on Parliament Hill. Black's personal and financial life were strained during the Great Depression, and he had a nervous breakdown. He was committed to the Westminster Veterans Hospital in London, Ontario for 6 months. Being unavailable to preside over the final session of the 17th Parliament, he resigned prior to its commencement in January 1935.

Since Black was unfit to run in the 1935 election his wife, Martha Black, ran in his place as an "Independent Conservative". She held the seat, becoming the second woman elected to the House of Commons (the first being Agnes Macphail), and the first American-born woman to do so.

Black was released from hospital in July 1935, and moved to Vancouver to recuperate. In 1940, Martha stepped aside and Black ran for his old seat. He won the Yukon seat in the 1940 election.

In the 1945 election, in Yukon riding, the Liberal riding association was concerned that Communist union organizer Tom McEwen of the Labor-Progressive Party, who was running for the seat, could win the election and opted not to run a candidate. The Liberal party instead supported Black against Communist and Co-operative Commonwealth Federation party candidates. The local unions supported McEwen and the LPP's platform of support for collective bargaining, family allowance, old age pensions, workers’ compensation and equality for "Indians and Eskimos." Black campaigned on a leftist platform as well, promising collective bargaining, minimum wages, maximum-hour and minimum-age laws, paid holidays, unemployment insurance and labour representation on government boards. He defeated McEwan by just 162 votes.

Black did not contest the seat in the 1949 election. He attempted to recapture his seat in the 1953 election but was unsuccessful.
