= Yukon Territorial Council =

The Yukon Territorial Council was a political body in the Canadian territory of Yukon, prior to the creation of the Yukon Legislative Assembly. Although not a full legislature, the council acted as an advisory body to the commissioner of Yukon, and had the power to pass non-binding motions of legislation which would be forwarded to the commissioner for consideration.

Unlike the federal governor general of Canada and the provincial lieutenant governors, who officially retain the power to approve or reject legislation from parliament or a provincial legislative assembly but in practice are bound by the will of the legislature with their powers of disallowance and reservation restricted to extraordinary circumstances, a territorial commissioner retains much stronger power over the territory's political affairs. The council was, thus, not a fully democratic government; although an elected body, its powers were significantly more constrained than those of a provincial legislative assembly.

== History ==
First established in 1898 as an appointed body, the first election to the council took place in 1900 to elect two at-large members alongside the already-appointed ones. Until 1909, the council retained a mix of appointed and elected members, with the 1909 election being the first one to elect the entire body.

In the first two Yukon elections and in the 1917 Yukon general election, party labels were used but thereafter elections to the council officially took place on a non-partisan basis. No political parties were incorporated at the territorial level, although the electoral district associations of the federal Progressive Conservative, Liberal and New Democratic parties sometimes put forward unofficial slates of candidates. Many other candidates were actively involved in the federal political parties, and effectively served as representatives of their federal party even if they had not been part of an organized slate.

The number of seats on the council varied throughout its history, from as few as three to as many as twelve.

The council met in Dawson City until 1953, when the territory's capital was moved to Whitehorse.

== Evolution toward democratic government ==
In 1966, the territorial council passed a motion calling for an elected council of 15 members, the upgrading of Yukon's status from a territory to a full province within 12 years, and the creation of an executive committee with full cabinet powers. Although the motion was disallowed, it did lead to the negotiation of a series of reforms in the 1970s which ultimately led to the establishment of the fully democratic Legislative Assembly of Yukon in 1978.

Beginning in 1970 an executive committee was created, consisting of the commissioner, two civil servants from the commissioner's administration, and two members of the territorial council. The two councillors on the executive committee were also given ministerial responsibilities over certain aspects of territorial governance; one minister would be responsible for education, while the other would be responsible for health and welfare, effectively making them much more powerful than their other colleagues on the council. The first two executive councillors, Hilda Watson and Norman Chamberlist, were able to convince two other non-executive councillors to support them in an electoral bloc which gave them disproportionate control over all council business on the seven-member council. Council business during this era regularly passed or failed on a consistent 4-3 split, based solely on whether Watson and Chamberlist supported or opposed the motion — thus effectively transforming the body from the consensus government model on which it had been based into a quasi-partisan majority government.

The new structure proved controversial, and led to a period of internal dissension within the council and widespread dissatisfaction with its work among the general public. Noted political conflicts during this era included a jurisdictional dispute with Whitehorse City Council in 1973 which led five of the six city councillors to resign their seats in protest, and dissension over the introduction of medicare in 1974 which resulted in 4,000 of the territory's 6,651 registered voters signing a petition demanding the council's dissolution.

For the subsequent 1974 election, federal Indian and Northern Affairs minister Jean Chrétien introduced legislation increasing the number of seats on the council from seven to 12, and the number of executive councillors from two to three. In 1977, a fourth executive councillor was added, giving the territorial council the majority of the seats on the executive committee for the first time.

The 1974 election was the last election of members to the territorial council. After a change in the territory's election law formally established the Legislative Assembly and the political party structure that now prevails in Yukon politics, the body was dissolved, and the 1978 election was the first one contested under the new fully democratic structure.

== Original members ==
=== Appointed ===
Appointments to the council were chosen by the Government of Canada.

Appointed Members of the Territorial Council
Name	Date Appointed	Date Left	Reason
Joseph-Éna Girouard	July 8, 1898	1908	
Sam Steele	July 8, 1898	September 5, 1899	Recalled to Ottawa by the federal government.
Thomas McGuire	July 8, 1898	October 7, 1898	Moved to the District of Saskatchewan.
Frederick Wade	July 8, 1898	October 17, 1898	
Calixte-Aimé Dugas	October 7, 1898		
William Henry Clement	October 17, 1898	March 13, 1901	
Aylesworth Perry	September 5, 1899	July 31, 1900	
Edmund Senkler	September 5, 1899		
Zachary Taylor Wood	July 31, 1900		
Frederick Congdon	March 13, 1901	September 14, 1901	
Henry William Newlands	September 14, 1901	1903	Appointed to Supreme Court of the Northwest Territories
John T. Lithgow	January 8, 1904		

=== Elected ===
The first election held on October 18, 1900 elected two members at large. The council would divide the territory into districts for the second general election held on January 13, 1903. Appointed members during this period did not have to be reappointed, although vacancies in appointed seats were filled with new appointments, and only seats held by elected members were vacated during elections. The elections were called by the Yukon Commissioner, while electoral district boundaries were controlled by an act of legislation from the council.

Elected Members of the Territorial Council
Election	Member	District	First elected
1900	Arthur Wilson	At-large	1900
1900	Alex Prud'homme	At-large	1900
1903	Joseph Clarke	District No. 1	1903
1903	Alfred Thompson	District No. 1	1903
1903	Maxime Landreville	District No. 2	1903
1903	John Pringle	District No. 2	1903
1903	Robert Lowe	Whitehorse	1903
1905	Richard Gillespie	Bonanza	1905
1905	George Black	Klondike	1905
1905	Henry Macaulay	North Dawson	1905
1905	Thomas O'Brien	South Dawson	1905
1905	Robert Lowe	Whitehorse	1903
1907	Thomas Kearny	Bonanza	1907
1907	George Black	Klondike	1905
1907	Joseph Lachapelle	North Dawson	1907
1907	John Grant	South Dawson	1907
1907	Robert Lowe	Whitehorse	1903

Alfred Thompson resigned his seat on November 3, 1904 after being elected as Yukon's federal Member of Parliament, but no by-election was held to succeed him.

== Numbered assemblies ==
For the 1909 election, the appointed seats were removed from the council, and the body became fully elected for the first time. Under the current conventions of the Legislative Assembly of Yukon, the current assembly as of the 2021 Yukon general election is enumerated as the 35th Assembly; this means that the fully elected council that took office in 1909 is treated as the first assembly for this purpose.

- Provisional Yukon Territorial Council (1898–1909)
- 1st Yukon Territorial Council (1909–1912)
- 2nd Yukon Territorial Council (1912–1915)
- 3rd Yukon Territorial Council (1915–1917)
- 4th Yukon Territorial Council (1917–1920)
- 5th Yukon Territorial Council (1920–1922)
- 6th Yukon Territorial Council (1922–1925)
- 7th Yukon Territorial Council (1925–1928)
- 8th Yukon Territorial Council (1928–1931)
- 9th Yukon Territorial Council (1931–1934)
- 10th Yukon Territorial Council (1934–1937)
- 11th Yukon Territorial Council (1937–1940)
- 12th Yukon Territorial Council (1940–1944)
- 13th Yukon Territorial Council (1944–1947)
- 14th Yukon Territorial Council (1947–1949)
- 15th Yukon Territorial Council (1949–1952)
- 16th Yukon Territorial Council (1952–1955)
- 17th Yukon Territorial Council (1955–1958)
- 18th Yukon Territorial Council (1958–1961)
- 19th Yukon Territorial Council (1961–1964)
- 20th Yukon Territorial Council (1964–1967)
- 21st Yukon Territorial Council (1967–1970)
- 22nd Yukon Territorial Council (1970–1974)
- 23rd Yukon Territorial Council (1974–1978)
