= Donald Taylor (Yukon politician) =

Canadian politician

Don Taylor

MLA for Watson Lake
- In office 1961–1985
- Succeeded by: Dave Porter

Personal details
- Born: Donald Emerson Taylor; September 22, 1933 Toronto, Ontario
- Died: October 7, 2012 (aged 79) Watson Lake, Yukon
- Party: Yukon Progressive Conservative Party

Donald Emerson "Don" Taylor (September 22, 1933 – October 7, 2012) was a former political figure in the Yukon, Canada. He represented Watson Lake in the Yukon Territorial Council from 1961 to 1978, and then in the Yukon Legislative Assembly from 1978 to 1985, as a Progressive Conservative then Independent member.

He was born in Toronto, the son of Emerson R. Taylor and Olive Kennedy, and educated in Toronto, Aurora and Lakefield. Johnston served as Speaker of the Yukon Legislative Assembly from 1974 to 1985. Before entering politics, Taylor was employed in mining exploration and aviation.

Taylor was defeated by Dave Porter when he ran for reelection in 1985. He died in 2012 of lung cancer.
