= Mayo (electoral district) =

Former territorial electoral district in the Yukon, Canada

Yukon electoral district

Defunct territorial electoral district
- Legislature: Yukon Legislative Assembly
- District created: 1928
- District abolished: 1992
- First contested: 1978
- Last contested: 1989

Demographics
- Electors (1989): 421
- Census subdivision(s): Mayo, Keno, Elsa, Stewart Crossing

Mayo was an electoral district which returned an MLA to the Legislative Assembly of the Yukon Territory in Canada. It was created in 1928, at a time when it was one of three districts who elected advisors to the Yukon Territorial Council. The more contemporary, final iteration of the riding was created from an amalgamation of the riding with part of the riding of Klondike. It was abolished in 1992 when it was amalgamated with the riding of Tatchun to form the riding of Mayo-Tatchun.

The district included the communities of Mayo, Keno, Elsa, and Stewart Crossing along the Silver Trail. At the time, it was one of the Yukon's nine rural ridings and was bordered by the ridings of Tatchun, Klondike, and Campbell.

It was situated on the traditional territory of the Selkirk First Nation and the First Nation of Na-Cho Nyäk Dun. As of 1970, the population of the electorate was 476 voters and by abolition (c. 1992) it was 421 voters.

== History ==
Mayo was created as a district in the 1928 Yukon election at a time when representatives for the Yukon Territorial Council were being elected. The Yukon Territorial Council was the Yukon's political body prior to the creation of the Yukon Legislative Assembly. Although not a full legislature, the council acted as an advisory body to the Commissioner of the Yukon, and had the power to pass non-binding motions of legislation which would be forwarded to the Commissioner for consideration. Because the Commissioner retained executive authority, empowered through Ottawa, the Yukon Territorial Council was thus not a fully democratic government. Although an elected body, its powers were significantly more constrained than those of a provincial legislative assembly.

When Mayo was created in 1928, it was one of three districts with representatives on the Yukon Territorial Council along with Dawson and Whitehorse.

When partisan politics was introduced to the Yukon in the 1978 election, Mayo was one of the initial electoral districts, its communities of Mayo, Elsa, Stewart Crossing, and Keno forming the centre of much of the Yukon's mining production. Elsa at one point was the 2nd largest producer of silver in Canada and the 4th largest in the world. Keno was also known for its silver and lead mining. However, in 1989 when United Keno Hill closed its mining operations in the area of Keno and Elsa, the communities essentially shut down. Keno maintains a small population of around 15-20 people, while Elsa is abandoned. Both are maintained as sites of historical significance.

Mayo is also the former seat of New Democrat MLA Piers McDonald who became Premier of the Yukon in 1996. He ran in the Whitehorse riding of McIntyre-Takhini when Mayo was dissolved into Mayo-Tatchun in 1992.

== MLAs ==
Parliament	Years	Member	Party
8th	1928–1931	Frank Carscallen	Independent
9th	1931–1934	Thomas MacKay	Independent
10th	1934–1937	Ernest Corp	Independent
11th	1937–1940	Ernest Corp	Independent
12th	1940–1944	Richard Lee	Independent
13th	1944–1947	Ernest Corp	Independent
14th	1947–1949	Ernest Corp	Independent
15th	1949–1952	Ernest Corp	Independent
16th	1952–1955	Alex Berry	Independent
17th	1955–1958	Duncan McGeachy	Independent
18th	1958–1961	Ray McKamey	Independent
19th	1961–1964	Ray McKamey	Independent
20th	1964–1967	Fred Southam	Independent
21st	1967–1970	Jean Gordon	Independent
22nd	1970–1974	Ronald Rivett	Independent
23rd	1974–1978	Gordon McIntyre	Independent
24th	1978–1982	Swede Hanson	Progressive Conservative
25th	1982–1985	Piers McDonald	New Democratic
26th	1985–1989	Piers McDonald	New Democratic
27th	1989–1992	Piers McDonald	New Democratic

== Electoral results ==
=== 1989 ===
1989 Yukon general election
Party	Candidate	Votes	%	±%
NDP	Piers McDonald	210	62.3%	+6.9%
Progressive Conservative	Mike McGinnis	93	27.6%	-12.7%
Liberal	Wilf Tuck	34	10.1%	+6.1%
Total		337	100.0%	–

=== 1985 ===
1985 Yukon general election
Party	Candidate	Votes	%	±%
NDP	Piers McDonald	251	55.4%	+3.1%
Progressive Conservative	Ken Cooper	183	40.3%	+1.0%
Liberal	Rob Andison	18	4.0%	-4.0%
Total		453	100.0%	–

=== 1982 ===
1982 Yukon general election
Party	Candidate	Votes	%	±%
NDP	Piers McDonald	230	52.3%	+29.1%
Progressive Conservative	Swede Hanson	173	39.3%	+12.5%
Liberal	Eleanor Van Bibber	35	8.0%	-16.0%
Total		440	100.0%	–

=== 1978 ===
1978 Yukon general election
Party	Candidate	Votes	%	±%
Progressive Conservative	Swede Hanson	95	26.8%	–
Independent	David Harwood	84	23.7%	–
Liberal	Gordon McIntyre	85	24.0%	–
NDP	Alan H. McDiarmid	82	23.2%	–
Total		354	100.0%	–

- Partisan politics introduced into the territory

=== 1974 ===
1974 Yukon general election
Party	Candidate	Votes	%	±%
Independent	Gordon McIntyre	199	55.3%	–
Independent	V.B.P. Mills	154	42.3%	–
Total		360	100.0%	–

=== 1970 ===
1970 Yukon general election
Party	Candidate	Votes	%	±%
Independent	Ronald Rivett	248	68.1%	–
Independent	George Dobson	69	19.0%	–
Independent	G. Jaen Gordon	46	12.6%	–
Total		364	100.0%	–

== See also ==
- List of Yukon territorial electoral districts
- Canadian provincial electoral districts
