= South Dawson (electoral district) =

Former territorial electoral district in the Yukon, Canada

South Dawson was a territorial electoral district in the Canadian territory of Yukon, which returned one or two members to the Yukon Territorial Council from 1905 to 1920.

== Members ==
Name	Took office	Left office
Thomas O'Brien	1905	1907
John Grant	1907	1909
George Black	1909	1912
James William Murphy	1909	1912
Isaac Lusk	1912	1914
A. J. Gillis	1912	1915
Donald McLennan	1914	1915
William G. Radford	1915	1917
Norman Watt	1915	1917
James Austin Fraser	1917	1920
Maxwell Charles Salter	1917	1920

== See also ==
- List of Yukon territorial electoral districts
- Canadian provincial electoral districts
