= Bonanza (electoral district) =

Former territorial electoral district in the Yukon, Canada

Bonanza was a territorial electoral district in the Canadian territory of Yukon, which returned one or two members to the Yukon Territorial Council from 1905 to 1920.

== Members ==
Name	Took office	Left office
Richard Gillespie	1905	1907
Thomas Kearney	1907	1909
Roderick Leander Ashbaugh	1909	1912
Frank McAlpine	1909	1912
Duncan Robertson	1912	1915
George Williams	1912	1917
John Turner	1912	1920
Allen Angus McMillan	1917	1920

== See also ==
- List of Yukon territorial electoral districts
- Canadian provincial electoral districts
