= Carmacks-Kluane =

Former territorial electoral district in the Yukon, Canada

Carmacks-Kluane was a territorial electoral district in the Canadian territory of Yukon, which was represented on the Yukon Territorial Council from 1952 to 1974.

== Representatives ==
Name	Took office	Left office
Alexander Hayes	1952	1958
John Livesey	1958	1964
Bob MacKinnon	1964	1967
John Livesey	1967	1970
Hilda Watson	1970	1974

== See also ==
- List of Yukon territorial electoral districts
- Canadian provincial electoral districts
