= Whitehorse East =

Former territorial electoral district in the Yukon, Canada

Whitehorse East was a territorial electoral district in the Canadian territory of Yukon, which was represented on the Yukon Territorial Council from 1952 to 1974. The district comprised the eastern portion of the territorial capital, Whitehorse.

== Representatives ==
Name	Took office	Left office
John Phelps	1952	1958
Charles Drury Taylor	1958	1961
Norman Chamberlist	1961	1961
Herbert Boyd	1962	1967
Norman Chamberlist	1967	1974

== See also ==
- List of Yukon territorial electoral districts
- Canadian provincial electoral districts
