= North Dawson (electoral district) =

Former territorial electoral district in the Yukon, Canada

North Dawson was a territorial electoral district in the Canadian territory of Yukon, which returned one or two members to the Yukon Territorial Council from 1905 to 1920.

== Members ==
Name	Took office	Left office
Henry Macaulay	1905	1907
Joseph Lachapelle	1907	1909
Charles Bossuyt	1909	1912
Andrew Smith	1909	1912
Alarie Seguin	1912	1914
Charles William Tabor	1912	1915
Frederick Pearce	1914	1915
William O'Brien	1915	1920
Joseph Guite	1915	1917
Maxime Landreville	1917	1920

== See also ==
- List of Yukon territorial electoral districts
- Canadian provincial electoral districts
