= Canadian provincial electoral districts =

Canadian provincial electoral districts have boundaries that are non-coterminous with those of the federal electoral districts, except for districts in the province of Ontario, where districts in the Southern Ontario region are coterminous while those in Northern Ontario are not.

Otherwise, provincial electoral districts tend instead to be smaller, ranging from just over half the size of each federal district (Quebec) to a seventh (PEI).

Like their federal counterparts, Canadian provincial electoral districts are commonly called ridings.

== Lists of provincial electoral districts ==
- List of Alberta provincial electoral districts
- List of British Columbia provincial electoral districts
- List of Manitoba provincial electoral districts
- List of New Brunswick provincial electoral districts
- List of Newfoundland and Labrador provincial electoral districts
- List of Nova Scotia provincial electoral districts
- List of Ontario provincial electoral districts
- List of Prince Edward Island provincial electoral districts
- List of Quebec provincial electoral districts
- List of Saskatchewan provincial electoral districts

== Lists of territorial electoral districts ==
- List of Yukon territorial electoral districts
- List of Northwest Territories territorial electoral districts
- List of Nunavut territorial electoral districts
