= Deacon Phelps =

Canadian politician

Member of the Yukon Territorial Council
- In office 1909–1920
- Preceded by: Robert Lowe
- Succeeded by: Robert Lowe
- Constituency: Whitehorse
- In office 1925–1934
- Preceded by: Robert Lowe
- Succeeded by: Charles Thomas Atherton
- Constituency: Whitehorse
- In office 1940–1943
- Preceded by: George Wilson
- Succeeded by: Alexander Smith
- Constituency: Whitehorse

Personal details
- Born: Willard Leroy Phelps; March 12, 1867 Merritton, Ontario
- Died: March 27, 1951 (aged 84) Whitehorse, Yukon
- Party: None
- Occupation: lawyer, prospector, businessman

Willard Leroy "Deacon" Phelps (March 12, 1867 - March 27, 1951) was a Canadian politician, lawyer and businessman. He was a member of the Yukon Territorial Council from 1909 to 1920, 1925 to 1934 and 1940 to 1943, and the owner and manager of the first hydroelectricity company in Yukon.

Originally from Merritton, Ontario, he attended Ridley College and Osgoode Hall before setting up a short-lived law practice in Toronto. He first moved to Yukon toward the end of the Klondike Gold Rush, but after falling short in that endeavour he became a business partner in Yukon Electrical Company in 1901, eventually becoming the company's sole owner and manager. He acquired the lifelong nickname Deacon after an incident when he caused the territory's first pastor to resign in frustration, by explaining that while he saw the value in the territory having a church he felt no need to personally attend it.

His son John Phelps and his grandson Willard Phelps both continued in roles with Yukon Electrical Company, and also both served on the territorial council. Willard became Government Leader of Yukon in 1985.
