= Speaker of the Yukon Legislative Assembly =

Canadian territorial legislative officer

The Speaker of the Yukon Legislative Assembly is the presiding officer of that legislature. Although the Yukon Territorial Council was first established by the confederation of the Yukon in 1898, it was not an elected body until 1909, when the position of Commissioner was turned into the Speaker of the Assembly. On December 13, 1974, the territorial council renamed itself to the Yukon Legislative Assembly.

List of Speakers
Name	Entered office	Left office
Robert Lowe	1909	1912
Alex Gillis	1912	1915
Archie Martin	1915	1917
John Turner	1917	1918
Allan A. McMillan	1918	1920
Robert Lowe	1920	1925
Charles Bossuyt	1925	1928
Frank Carscallen	1928	1931
Andrew Teddie	1931	1937
Ernest J. Corp	1937	1940
Richard Lee	1940	1943
Ernest J. Corp	1944	1952
A.R. Hayes	1952	1958
John Livesey	1958	1964
George Shaw	1964	1967
John Livesey	1967	1970
Ronald A. Rivett	1970	1974
Donald Taylor	December 13, 1974	1985
Sam Johnston	July 15, 1985	December 1992
Alan Nordling	December 14, 1992	1994
John Devries	April 16, 1994	1996
Robert Bruce	December 4, 1996	1997
Doug Livingston	March 24, 1997	1997
Robert Bruce	April 14, 1997	2000
Dennis Schneider	June 5, 2000	2002
Ted Staffen	February 27, 2003	October 11, 2011
David Laxton	December 5, 2011	May 10, 2016
Patti McLeod	May 10, 2016	January 12, 2017
Nils Clarke	January 12, 2017	May 3, 2021
Jeremy Harper	May 11, 2021	November 3, 2025
Yvonne Clarke	December 8, 2025	
