= Dawson (electoral district) =

Former territorial electoral district in the Yukon, Canada

Dawson electoral district was a territorial electoral district in the Yukon Territory, Canada, which elected a member to the Yukon Territorial Council. The electoral district was created in 1920 by the merger of the former districts of North Dawson and South Dawson. The electoral district once reached the far north of Old Crow by the 1970 election, and was redistricted in 1974 election.

== Representatives ==
Name	Took office	Left office
Paul S. Hogan	1920	1922
William Kenneth Currie	1922	1925
Charles Bossuyt	1925	1928
Andrew Taddie	1928	1937
John Macdonald	1937	1940
Andrew Taddie	1940	1944
John Fraser	1944	1949
Charles Lelievre	1949	1952
Vincent Mellor	1952	1958
George Shaw	1958	1970
Mike Stutter	1970	1974

== Results ==
=== 1920 ===
1920 Yukon general election
Name	Vote	%
Gavin Fowlie	342	%
Edwards	266	%
Total	608	100%

=== 1922 ===
1922 Yukon general election
Name	Vote
William Kenneth Currie	Acclaimed

== See also ==
- List of Yukon territorial electoral districts
- Canadian provincial electoral districts
