= Whitehorse (electoral district) =

Former territorial electoral district in the Yukon, Canada

Whitehorse electoral district was a territorial electoral district in the Yukon Territory, Canada. The electoral district was created in 1903.

== Results ==
=== 1903 ===
1903 Yukon general election
Affiliation	Name	Vote	%
Government	Robert Lowe	180	58.6%
Unknown	Edward Dixon	92	30.0%
Unknown	Leonard Sugden	35	11.4%
Total		307	100%

=== 1920 ===
1920 Yukon general election
Name	Vote	%
Robert Lowe	124	57.9%
French	90	42.1%
Total	214	100%

=== 1922 ===
1922 Yukon general election
Name	Vote
Robert Lowe	Acclaimed

== See also ==
- List of Yukon territorial electoral districts
- Canadian provincial electoral districts
