= 36th Legislature of Yukon =

Canadian provincial legislature since 2025

- Majority parliament
- Dec. 8, 2025 – present

Parliament leaders
- Premier: Currie Dixon; Nov. 22, 2025 – present
- Cabinet: Dixon ministry
- Leader of the Opposition: Kate White; Nov. 3, 2025 – present

Party caucuses
- Government: Yukon
- Opposition: New Democratic
- Recognized: Liberal

Legislative Assembly
- Seating arrangements of the Legislative Assembly
- Speaker of the Lower House: Yvonne Clarke; Dec. 8, 2025 – present
- Members: 21 seats

Sovereign
- Monarch: Charles III; Sep. 8, 2022 – present
- Commissioner: Adeline Webber; May. 31, 2023 – present
← 35th

The 36th Legislature of Yukon were elected at the 2025 Yukon general election.

== Party total ==
Party	Seats
Yukon	14
New Democratic	6
Liberal	1
Independent	0

== List of members ==
The table contain the names, parties, and ridings of the MLAs.
Bold indicates the Party Leader.
Italics indicates a cabinet minister.
Bold and Italics indicates the Premier.

Name	Party	Riding	First elected / previously elected	No. of terms
**Currie Dixon**	Yukon	Copperbelt North	2011, 2021	3rd term*
Scott Kent	Yukon	Copperbelt South	2000, (Note: Riverside (First elected as a Liberal)) 2011	5th term*
Brent McDonald	New Democratic	Klondike	2025	1st term
Wade Istchenko	Yukon	Kluane	2011	4th term
Brad Cathers	Yukon	Lake Laberge	2002	6th term
Cory Bellmore	Yukon	Mayo-Tatchun	2025	1st term
Jen Gehmair	Yukon	Marsh Lake-Mount Lorne-Golden Horn	2025	1st term
Linda Moen	New Democratic	Mountainview	2025	1st term
Patti McLeod	Yukon	Watson Lake-Ross River-Faro	2011	4th term
Ted Laking	Yukon	Porter Creek Centre	2025	1st term
Doris Anderson	Yukon	Porter Creek North	2025	1st term
Adam Gerle	Yukon Party	Porter Creek South	2025	1st term
Carmen Gustafson	New Democratic	Riverdale North	2025	1st term
Justin Ziegler	New Democratic	Riverdale South	2025	1st term
**Kate White**	New Democratic	Takhini	2011	4th term
Debra-Leigh Reti	Liberal	Vuntut Gwitchin	2025	1st term
Tyler Porter	Yukon	Southern Lakes	2025	1st term
Lane Tredger	New Democratic	Whitehorse Centre	2021	2nd term
Laura Lang	Yukon	Whitehorse West	2025	1st term
Yvonne Clarke	Yukon	Whistle Bend North	2021	2nd term
Linda Benoit	Yukon	Whistle Bend South	2025	1st term
