= Same-sex marriage in Yukon =

Same-sex marriage has been legal in Yukon since July 14, 2004, immediately following a ruling from the Supreme Court of Yukon. This made the territory the fourth jurisdiction in Canada, and the seventh in the world after the Netherlands, Belgium, Ontario, British Columbia, Quebec and Massachusetts, to legalise same-sex marriage. Yukon was the first of Canada's three territories to legalise same-sex marriage, and the only one to do so before the federal legalisation of same-sex marriage in July 2005 by the Parliament of Canada.

== Court ruling ==
In July 2003, Justice Minister Elaine Taylor said the government was taking a "wait-and-see" approach to same-sex marriage in Yukon, and would prefer for the Supreme Court of Canada or the Parliament of Canada to address the issue, "I think it's very important to have your ducks lined up, so to speak. The thing that I would hate to see, is that in fact, we did start issuing marriage licenses today or tomorrow, and the bill in fact did not live up to the scrutiny of the Supreme Court of Canada, or perhaps did not even go through the House of Commons. Then there would be somewhat of legal quagmire. We want to bring certainty to those individuals who want to be recognized as same-sex couples. We want to take a responsible position."

In January 2004, Rob Edge and Stephen Dunbar were denied a marriage licence at the Vital Statistics Office in Whitehorse. "We could have driven across the border to British Columbia, but that wasn't good enough. My family and I contributed a lot to this community over the years and I wanted to be married here to the man I love. I'm a Yukoner. I don't want a license that's not recognized by my government. I knew my timing was right and that the territory was ready for it", Dunbar said. The couple brought suit in Dunbar and Edge v. Yukon et al. against the Yukon and federal governments in June 2004. Their lawyer, Jim Tucker, used a novel approach: rather than arguing on the basis of Section 15 of the Canadian Charter of Rights and Freedoms as in the previous cases, he argued that the federal government's failure to appeal the decisions legalising same-sex marriage in Ontario, British Columbia and Quebec signalled a change in Canadian common law regarding marriage. Martha McCarthy, a lawyer who had represented the couples in Ontario and Quebec, said, "Same-sex couples should not have to wait patiently for their rights to be upheld. The federal government accepted not only the Ontario and B.C. court rulings that marriage licenses be issued to same-sex couples, but also the Quebec Court of Appeal's ruling that the law has changed across the country. If they accept that in Quebec, how can they now take a different position in the Yukon?"

On July 14, 2004, Supreme Court Justice Peter McIntyre agreed that the federal government was inconsistent in its approach to the definition of marriage, a federal responsibility, since it had not appealed the first three decisions. Therefore, the territory's failure to provide marriage licences to same-sex couples meant that the law was being inconsistently applied in Yukon. Justice McIntyre declared same-sex marriages legal in Yukon, and ordered the government to issue a marriage licence to Edge and Dunbar. The judge obtained verbal promises from the Yukon Government that the couple would be granted a marriage licence. Premier Dennis Fentie praised the ruling. Laurie Arron, from Egale Canada, said, "This ruling sends a message that governments across the country must now accept the Charter rights of same-sex couples to marry in a civil ceremony. There is one law for the whole country, and that law includes same-sex couples." McIntyre wrote in his ruling:

As to the need for a record, in my view, I have no need for more evidence than the refusal of the Yukon Territorial Government to issue a licence or to register the marriage because of its understanding of the common law and the acknowledgement by the Attorney General of Canada that the common law rule is discriminatory. It is true that there appears to have been a great deal of evidence before the courts of first instance and appeal in British Columbia, Ontario and Quebec; but there is no need to repeat this evidence before me or any other member of this Court in order to arrive at a conclusion already reached after tremendous application of judicious effort by three provincial courts of appeal in order to lead to a conclusion that the Attorney General of Canada properly acknowledges is correct, that is, that the common-law definition of marriage is unconstitutional, a conclusion that is, after all, a conclusion of law, not fact.

== Territorial legislation ==
In May 2002, the Yukon Legislative Assembly approved a bill allowing same-sex couples to adopt children jointly. The law took effect on 1 January 2003. On 9 December 2014, the Assembly amended the territorial Marriage Act (French: Loi sur le mariage; Gwichʼin: Nihkhàgadhidii geenjit dàgwìdįįʼee) to replace all references to "husband and wife" with the gender-neutral term "spouses". It received royal assent by Commissioner Doug Phillips on 11 December and took effect on 1 June 2015. The act states:

If a marriage ceremony is performed by a marriage commissioner [...] (b) each of the parties shall, in the presence of the marriage commissioner and the witnesses, say to the other party: "I call upon these persons here present to witness that I,______________, do take thee, ______________ to be my lawful wedded husband (or wife or spouse)." [RSY 2002, c.146, s.13]

Further legislation, the Equality of Spouses Statute Law Amendment Act 2018, was passed 16–0 by the Assembly on 29 October 2018. It replaced references to "husband and wife" and "a man and a woman" in other acts, including the Evidence Act and the Family Property and Support Act. MLA Kate White referenced Dunbar and Edge when speaking in favour of the legislation: "It is a pleasure today to rise and speak to Bill No. 21, entitled Equality of Spouses Statute Law Amendment Act 2018. I am well aware right now, on the floor, that we have trailblazers in the gallery. We have Rob and Stephen Dunbar-Edge, who have done so much for the territory, as well as Chase Blodgett, who has also supported change in all of the ways that we needed to. The reminder is that human rights are human rights are human rights. I can only imagine how slowly time moves for those who are most adversely affected by laws and legislation as we ask them to be patient as governments and society work to catch up. Today I am so pleased to be here, to know that we have removed more of those barriers, knowing people like them who have been fighting these injustices since the beginning of time. It is a great day to be here in the Assembly and to know that the 34th Legislative Assembly is making Yukon a more just and welcoming place." The law was assented by Commissioner Angélique Bernard.

29 October 2018 vote in the Legislative Assembly
Party	Voted for	Voted against	Absent (Did not vote)
Yukon Liberal Party	9: Ted Adel; Jeanie Dendys; Pauline Frost; Paolo Gallina; Don Hutton; Tracy-Anne McPhee; Richard Mostyn; Ranj Pillai; John Streicker	–	1: Sandy Silver
Yukon Party	5: Brad Cathers; Scott Kent; Wade Istchenko; Patti McLeod; Geraldine Van Bibber	–	1: Stacey Hassard
Yukon New Democratic Party	2: Elizabeth Hanson; Kate White	–	–
Total (Note: The Speaker of the Yukon Legislative Assembly, Nils Clarke, votes only in case of a tied vote.)	16	0	2
Total	88.9%	0.0%	11.1%

== First Nations ==
While the Indian Act governs many aspects of life for First Nations in Canada, it does not directly govern marriage or provide a framework for conducting customary marriages. Instead, marriage laws are primarily governed by provincial and territorial legislation. However, the Indian Act has some indirect impacts on marriage, particularly regarding band membership and property rights on reserves.

While there are no records of same-sex marriages being performed in First Nations cultures in the way they are commonly defined in Western legal systems, many Indigenous communities recognize identities and relationships that may be placed on the LGBT spectrum. Among these are two-spirit individuals—people who embody both masculine and feminine qualities. In some cultures, two-spirit individuals assigned male at birth wear women's clothing and engage in household and artistic work associated with the feminine sphere. Historically, this identity sometimes allowed for unions between two people of the same biological sex. Ethnographic sources report that the Dene recognised gender variance and an institutionalized two-spirit status. First Nations have deep-rooted marriage traditions, placing a strong emphasis on community, family and spiritual connections. For example, customary Gwichʼin marriages incorporate spiritual practices, along with feasting and traditional dances. Marriages were exogamous, matrilineal and mostly monogamous, though chiefs (khèhkwaii), shamans (dinjii dazhan) and wealthy men occasionally practiced polygyny. Likewise, Northern Tutchone marriages were traditionally exogamous and matrilineal, with bride service also required and chiefs (hákí) practicing polygyny.

== Marriage statistics ==
44 same-sex couples married in Yukon between July 2004 and July 2014. The 2016 Canadian census showed that there were 70 same-sex spouses living in Yukon, with 55 (78.6%) being women. The census also showed that about 1.9% of Whitehorse women in couples were in same-sex relationships; the second highest in Canada after Yellowknife in the Northwest Territories. Men in same-sex couples accounted for 0.7% of men in couples.

== Religious performance ==
In July 2019, the synod of the Anglican Church of Canada passed a resolution known as "A Word to the Church", allowing its dioceses to choose whether to bless and perform same-sex marriages. The canons of the Diocese of Yukon do not explicitly prohibit same-sex marriages, and one of the only mentions to marriage defines it as being "between two people". Former Bishop Larry Robertson, who retired in 2019, was opposed to same-sex marriage.

Some other religious organisations perform same-sex marriages in their places of worship, including the United Church of Canada, Quakers, the Evangelical Lutheran Church in Canada, and the Canadian Unitarian Council.

== See also ==
- Same-sex marriage in Canada
- LGBT rights in Canada
