= 33rd Legislature of Yukon =

Legislature of Yukon, Canada, 2011–2016

The 33rd Yukon Legislative Assembly commenced on October 12, 2011, after Yukon voters returned a majority Yukon Party government under the leadership of Darrell Pasloski. The Yukon NDP became the official opposition while the Liberals took third place status.

The membership in this Legislature increased by one seat after the boundary redistribution.

== Leadership changes ==
After losing opposition status in the general election and going from five seats to two, the Liberal party has been beset with leadership issues. Former leader Arthur Mitchell resigned after being defeated in the redistricted Copperbelt North riding. He was replaced by interim leader Darius Elias who left the leadership position and the caucus on August 17, 2012. By default Sandy Silver became leader of the party as the sole remaining MLA. Silver officially became party leader on March 1, 2014.

== Dissolution ==
The 33rd Legislature was dissolved on October 7, 2016, with a general election called for November 7, 2016. The Yukon Party was defeated and the Yukon Liberal Party under Sandy Silver formed a majority government. Pasloski lost his own seat and the New Democrat caucus was reduced to third party status.

== Members at Dissolution ==
Name	Party	Riding	First elected / previously elected	No. of terms
Currie Dixon	Yukon Party	Copperbelt North	2011	1st term
Lois Moorcroft	New Democratic Party	Copperbelt South	1992, 2011	3rd term*
Sandy Silver	Liberal	Klondike	2011	1st term
Wade Istchenko	Yukon Party	Kluane	2011	1st term
Brad Cathers	Yukon Party	Lake Laberge	2002	3rd term
Jim Tredger	New Democratic Party	Mayo-Tatchun	2011	1st term
Kevin Barr	New Democratic Party	Mount Lorne-Southern Lakes	2011	1st term
Darrell Pasloski	Yukon Party	Mountainview	2011	1st term
Stacey Hassard	Yukon Party	Pelly-Nisutlin	2011	1st term
David Laxton	Yukon Party	Porter Creek Centre	2011	1st term
David Laxton	Independent	Porter Creek Centre	2011	1st term
Doug Graham	Yukon Party	Porter Creek North	1978, (Note: Whitehorse Porter Creek West) 2011	2nd term*
Mike Nixon	Yukon Party	Porter Creek South	2011	1st term
Scott Kent	Yukon Party	Riverdale North	2000, (Note: Riverside (First elected as a Liberal)) 2011	2nd term*
Jan Stick	New Democratic Party	Riverdale South	2011	1st term
Kate White	New Democratic Party	Takhini-Kopper King	2011	1st term
Darius Elias	Liberal	Vuntut Gwitchin	2006	2nd term
Darius Elias	Independent	Vuntut Gwitchin	2006	2nd term
Darius Elias	Yukon Party	Vuntut Gwitchin	2006	2nd term
Patti McLeod	Yukon Party	Watson Lake	2011	1st term
Elizabeth Hanson	New Democratic Party	Whitehorse Centre	2010	2nd term
Elaine Taylor	Yukon Party	Whitehorse West	2002	3rd term

== Standings changes since the 2011 general election ==
Number of members per party by date	2011	2012	2013	2016
Number of members per party by date	Oct 11	Aug 17	Jul 8	May 10
Yukon Party	11		12	11
NDP	6			
Liberal	2	1		
Independent	0	1	0	1
Total members	19			
Vacant	0			
Government Majority	3		5	3

=== Membership changes ===
Membership changes in the 33rd Assembly
Date	Name	District	Party	Reason
October 8, 2011	See List of Members			Election day of the 37th Yukon general election
August 17, 2012	Darius Elias	Vuntut Gwitchin	Independent	Left the Liberal caucus and leadership to sit as an Independent.
July 8, 2013	Darius Elias	Vuntut Gwitchin	Yukon Party	Joined the Yukon Party caucus.
May 10, 2016	David Laxton	Porter Creek Centre	Independent	Left the Yukon Party caucus and resigned as speaker due to sexual harassment allegation.
