= Whistle Bend North =

Territorial electoral district in the Yukon, Canada

Yukon electoral district
- Interactive map of riding boundaries

Territorial electoral district
- Legislature: Yukon Legislative Assembly
MLA
Yvonne Clarke
Yukon Party
- District created: 2024
- First contested: 2025

Demographics
- Population (2024): 1,910
- Electors (2024): 951
- Census subdivision: Whitehorse

Whistle Bend North is an electoral district which returns a member (known as an MLA) to the Yukon Legislative Assembly. In accordance with the Yukon Electoral District Boundaries Act (2024), it was first contested at the 2025 Yukon general election, as one of thirteen ridings in the City of Whitehorse.

== Geography ==
The riding is located in Whistle Bend, on the western bank of the Yukon River, north of Eldorado Drive and northside of Keno Way. It is 3.60 square kilometres in area, making it the fourth smallest out of twenty-one ridings.

== History ==
The riding was created out of Porter Creek Centre and an unpopulated area of Porter Creek North, due to rapid growth in the Whistle Bend Development (the fastest of any community in Yukon) that is expected to continue into the latter half of the decade. It borders Whistle Bend South, the other new riding created from redistricting, in addition to the aforementioned ridings of Porter Creek Centre and Porter Creek North.

The number of votes in the riding will initially be lower relative to other ridings in Whitehorse because of several considerations of the Electoral District Boundaries Commission aimed towards better voter parity. Firstly, in anticipation of continued growth outpacing that of the rest of Yukon, the number of electors was set at a considerably lower level. Secondly, because Whistle Bend has a sizable amount of new development, many may not have yet registered to vote with their address in Whistle Bend. As of March 31, 2024, despite a population estimate of 3,760 that would usually represent an average of 2,632 electors, there were only 2,201 registered electors in Whistle Bend. However, as residents settle in, voter registrations should start to experience a sharp increase in the coming years.

Overall, while the variance from the electoral quotient starts out at −40 points, it is expected to be significantly reduced to within a −25-point variance and actually surpass the electoral quotient with 1700+ electors by the end of 2025, as well as to eventually exceed a +25-point variance with 3,000+ electors by 2030, due to factors of population growth and self-correction of elector undercounts.

Assembly	Years	Member	Party
Whistle Bend North; Riding created from Porter Creek Centre and Porter Creek North
36th	2025–Present	Yvonne Clarke	Yukon Party

== Election results ==
=== 2025 ===
2025 Yukon general election
Party	Candidate	Votes	%	±%
Yukon Party	Yvonne Clarke	457	52.65	+4.53
New Democratic	Tiara Topps	304	35.02	+19.98
Liberal	Beverly Cooper	107	12.33	–24.51
Total valid votes		868		
Total rejected ballots				
Turnout			59.86	
Eligible voters		1,450		
Yukon Party notional hold		Swing		–7.73
Source(s) "2025 General Election Official Results". Elections Yukon.

2021 Yukon general election redistributed results
Party	Votes	%
Yukon Party	128	48
Liberal	98	37
New Democratic	40	15

== See also ==
- List of Yukon territorial electoral districts
- Canadian provincial electoral districts
