= 34th Legislature of Yukon =

Legislature of Yukon, Canada, 2016–2021

The 34th Yukon Legislative Assembly commenced on November 8, 2016, after Yukon voters defeated the Yukon Party government under the leadership of Darrell Pasloski and returned a Liberal majority government under the leadership of Sandy Silver. The Yukon Party was reduced to Official Opposition status and the New Democrats were reduced to Third Party status.

It is the second Liberal government in Yukon history.

== First Session ==
The first session of the 34th Legislative Assembly was convened on January 12, 2017. The single-day session was called by the Premier in order to allow the legislature to elect a new Speaker (Nils Clarke) and establish committee membership from among the MLAs. In a rarity, there was no indication from the government as to what its legislative agenda would look like in its term, as the government signaled its preference to use a late spring sitting for its Speech from the Throne.

The short one-day session drew criticism from the Opposition, which claimed that the government had denied them the opportunity to hold the government to account through either debate or Question Periods.

The Premier later called a second sitting of the Legislative Assembly for April 20; five months since the government was sworn into office. According to the Whitehorse Star, since the beginning of party politics in the Yukon in 1978, no government had gone so long between an election and its first Question Period. The decision drew fire from the Opposition, who labeled it a "profound lack of respect for the legislature." Premier Silver also drew criticism for authorizing nearly $30 million in Special Warrant spending - money approved without legislative oversight - a practice he decried while in Opposition himself. Weeks later, Silver authorized an even larger Special Warrant - this time worth up to $427 million, with $334 million related to operation and maintenance funds and $93 million to capital plans up to June 30, 2017. This new Special Warrant, the largest in Yukon history by more than double, drew severe criticism from the Opposition, who labeled Silver's actions as hypocritical.

== Executive Council ==
The new Executive Council of the Yukon (Cabinet) was sworn in on December 3, 2016. Premier Silver appointed six ministers; a Cabinet that was smaller than his predecessors. The Cabinet was the second gender-balanced Cabinet in Yukon history, following in the footsteps of the previous Liberal Premier Pat Duncan.

The Executive Council was made up of members of the Yukon Liberal Party

Commissioner
The Honourable Angélique Bernard		2018—2023
Portfolio	Minister	
Premier of Yukon & Minister responsible for the Executive Council Office & Minister of Finance	Sandy Silver	2016—2021
Deputy Premier & Minister of Energy, Mines and Resources & Minister of Economic Development & Minister responsible for the Yukon Development Corporation & Minister responsible for the Yukon Energy Corporation	Ranj Pillai	2016—2021
Government House Leader & Minister of Justice & Minister of Education	Tracy-Anne McPhee	2016—2021
Minister of Community Services & Minister responsible for the French Language Services Directorate & Minister responsible for the Yukon Liquor Corporation & Minister responsible for the Yukon Lottery Corporation	John Streicker	2016—2021
Minister of Health & Social Services & Minister of the Environment & Minister responsible for the Yukon Housing Corporation	Pauline Frost	2016—2021
Minister of Highways & Public Works & Minister of the Public Service Commission	Richard Mostyn	2016—2021
Minister of Tourism and Culture & Minister responsible for the Women's Directorate & Minister responsible for Yukon Workers' Compensation Health and Safety Board	Jeanie Dendys	2016—2021

== Leadership changes ==
Darrell Pasloski was defeated in his riding of Mountainview on election night and was unable to return to the Yukon Legislative Assembly to lead the Yukon Party. After losing government status and falling to six seats, the Yukon Party appointed Stacey Hassard as interim leader. He is also interim Leader of the Official Opposition until the Yukon Party chooses a permanent replacement in the spring of 2017.

== Seating plan ==
	McLeod	Istchenko	Cathers	Van Bibber			Hutton
		Kent	HASSARD		WHITE	Hanson
Clarke
		McPhee	SILVER	Frost	Pillai
	Adel	Gallina	Mostyn	Streicker	Dendys

== Members ==
Italicized text indicates a member of cabinet. Bold text indicates a party leader. Both indicates the Premier of Yukon

Name	Party	Riding	First elected / previously elected	No. of terms
Ted Adel	Liberal	Copperbelt North	2016	1st term
Scott Kent	Yukon	Copperbelt South	2000, (Note: Riverside (First elected as a Liberal)) 2011	3rd term*
**Sandy Silver**	Liberal	Klondike	2011	2nd term
Wade Istchenko	Yukon	Kluane	2011	2nd term
Brad Cathers	Yukon	Lake Laberge	2002	4th term
Don Hutton	Liberal	Mayo-Tatchun	2016	1st term
Don Hutton	Independent	Mayo-Tatchun	2016	1st term
John Streicker	Liberal	Mount Lorne-Southern Lakes	2016	1st term
Jeanie Dendys	Liberal	Mountainview	2016	1st term
**Stacey Hassard**	Yukon	Pelly-Nisutlin	2011	2nd term
Paolo Gallina	Liberal	Porter Creek Centre	2016	1st term
Geraldine Van Bibber	Yukon	Porter Creek North	2016	1st term
Ranj Pillai	Liberal	Porter Creek South	2016	1st term
Nils Clarke	Liberal	Riverdale North	2016	1st term
Tracy-Anne McPhee	Liberal	Riverdale South	2016	1st term
**Kate White**	New Democratic	Takhini-Kopper King	2011	2nd term
Pauline Frost	Liberal	Vuntut Gwitchin	2016	1st term
Patti McLeod	Yukon	Watson Lake	2011	2nd term
Elizabeth Hanson	New Democratic	Whitehorse Centre	2010	3rd term
Richard Mostyn	Liberal	Whitehorse West	2016	1st term
