= Porter Creek Centre =

Territorial electoral district in the Yukon, Canada

Yukon electoral district
- Boundaries of Porter Creek Centre in Whitehorse

Territorial electoral district
- Legislature: Yukon Legislative Assembly
MLA
Ted Laking
Yukon Party
- District created: 2002
- First contested: 2002
- Last contested: 2025

Demographics
- Electors (2021): 2,477
- Census subdivision: Whitehorse

Porter Creek Centre is a territorial electoral district of Yukon that has been represented in the Yukon Legislative Assembly since 2002.

The district was established from portions of the Whitehorse ridings of Porter Creek North and Porter Creek South. Following the 2024 electoral redistribution, it underwent significant boundary changes, losing the Whistle Bend neighbourhood and gaining areas west of the Alaska Highway.

== Geography ==
Porter Creek Centre comprises the central portion of the Porter Creek subdivision in Whitehorse, including areas around the Kulan Industrial Area and the Alaska Highway. It is bordered by the districts of Porter Creek North, Porter Creek South, Whistle Bend North, Whistle Bend South, and Lake Laberge.

== Members of the Legislative Assembly ==
Assembly	Years	Member	Party
Porter Creek Centre; Riding created from Porter Creek North and Porter Creek South
31st	2002–2006	Archie Lang	Yukon Party
32nd	2006–2011	Archie Lang	Yukon Party
33rd	2011–2016	David Laxton	Yukon Party
33rd	2016–2016	David Laxton	Independent
34th	2016–2021	Paolo Gallina	Liberal
35th	2021–2025	Yvonne Clarke	Yukon Party
36th	2025–present	Ted Laking	Yukon Party

== Election results ==
=== 2025 ===
2025 Yukon general election
** Preliminary results — Not yet official **
Party	Candidate	Votes	%	±%
Yukon Party	Ted Laking	707	67.3	
New Democratic	Hilary Smith	262	24.9	
Liberal	Louis Gagnon	82	7.8	
Total valid votes		1,051		
Total rejected ballots				
Turnout				
Eligible voters				
Source(s) "Unofficial Election Results 2025". Elections Yukon.

2021 Yukon general election redistributed results
Party	Votes	%
Yukon Party	546	47
Liberal	392	34
New Democratic	223	19

=== 2021 ===
2021 Yukon general election
Party	Candidate	Votes	%	±%
Yukon Party	Yvonne Clarke	704	41.87	+5.5%
Liberal	Paolo Gallina	643	38.25	-4.9%
New Democratic	Shonagh McCrindle	334	19.86	-0.6%
Total valid votes		1,681		
Total rejected ballots				
Turnout				
Eligible voters				
Yukon Party gain		Swing		+1.81
Source(s) "Unofficial Election Results 2021". Elections Yukon.

=== 2016 ===
2016 Yukon general election
Party	Candidate	Votes	%	±%
Liberal	Paolo Gallina	452	43.3%	+11.7%
Yukon Party	Michelle Kolla	379	36.3%	-2.5%
NDP	Pat Berrel	213	20.4%	-9.3%
Total		1044	100.0%	

=== 2011 ===
2011 Yukon general election
Party	Candidate	Votes	%	±%
Yukon Party	David Laxton	298	38.5%	-8.8%
Liberal	Kerry Huff	245	31.6%	+0.8%
NDP	Jean-François Des Lauriers	230	29.7%	+7.8%
Total		773	100.0%	–

=== 2006 ===
2006 Yukon general election
Party	Candidate	Votes	%	±%
Yukon Party	Archie Lang	344	47.3%	-4.3%
Liberal	David Laxton	224	30.8%	-9.5%
NDP	Kate White	159	21.9%	+13.8%
Total		727	100.0%	–

=== 2002 ===
2002 Yukon general election
Party	Candidate	Votes	%	±%
Yukon Party	Archie Lang	399	51.6%	–
Liberal	Scott Kent	312	40.3%	–
NDP	Judi Johnny	63	8.1%	–
Total		774	100.0%	–

== See also ==
- List of Yukon territorial electoral districts
- Canadian provincial electoral districts
