= 35th Legislature of Yukon =

Legislature of Yukon, Canada, 2021–

35 Legislature of Yukon
- Minority parliament
- May. 11, 2021 – Oct. 3, 2025

Parliament leaders
- Premier: Sandy Silver; Dec. 3, 2016 – Jan. 14, 2023
- Ranj Pillai; Jan. 14, 2023 – Jun. 27, 2025
- Mike Pemberton; Jun. 27, 2025 – Nov. 22, 2025

Party caucuses
- Government: Yukon Liberal Party
- Opposition: Yukon Party

Sovereign
- Monarch: Elizabeth II; Feb. 6, 1952 – Sep. 8, 2022
- Charles III; Sep. 8, 2022 – present
← 34th	→ 36th

The 35th Legislature of Yukon were elected at the 2021 Yukon general election. Jeremy Harper was the speaker of the Yukon Legislative Assembly, elected on May 11, 2021.

== Pillai ministry ==
Commissioner
The Honourable Adeline Webber		2023–
Portfolio	Minister	
Premier of Yukon & Minister responsible for the Executive Council Office	Ranj Pillai	2023–2025
Deputy Premier & Minister of Education & Minister responsible for the Women and Gender Equity Directorate	Jeanie McLean	2023–2025
Minister of Energy, Mines and Resources & Minister of Tourism and Culture & Minister responsible for Yukon Development Corporation & Minister responsible for Yukon Energy Corporation & Minister responsible for French Languages Service Directorate	John Streicker	2021–2025
Minister of Community Services & Minister responsible for Yukon Workers' Compensation Health and Safety Board	Richard Mostyn	2021–2025
Minister of Economic Development & Minister responsible for the Yukon Housing Corporation	Ranj Pillai	2021–2025
Minister of Highways & Public Works & Minister of the Environment	Nils Clarke	2021–2025
Minister of Justice & Minister of Health and Social Services	Tracy-Anne McPhee	2023–2025
Minister of Finance & Minister of the Public Service Commission & Minister responsible for Yukon Liquor Corporation & Minister responsible for Yukon Lottery Commission	Sandy Silver	2023–2025

== Seating plan ==
	McLeod	Van Bibber	Hassard	Istchenko	Tredger
	Kent	Dixon	Clarke	Cathers	White	Blake
Harper
	McPhee	Pillai	Streicker	McLean
		Clarke	Silver	Mostyn

== Members ==
The table contain the names, parties, and ridings of the MLAs.
Bold indicates the Party Leader.
Italics indicates a cabinet minister.
Bold and Italics indicates the Premier.

Name	Party	Riding	First elected / previously elected	No. of terms
**Currie Dixon**	Yukon	Copperbelt North	2011, 2021	2nd term*
Scott Kent	Yukon	Copperbelt South	2000, (Note: Riverside (First elected as a Liberal)) 2011	4th term*
Sandy Silver	Liberal	Klondike	2011	3rd term
Wade Istchenko	Yukon	Kluane	2011	3rd term
Brad Cathers	Yukon	Lake Laberge	2002	5th term
Jeremy Harper	Liberal	Mayo-Tatchun	2021	1st term
John Streicker	Liberal	Mount Lorne-Southern Lakes	2016	2nd term
Jeanie McLean	Liberal	Mountainview	2016	2nd term
Stacey Hassard	Yukon	Pelly-Nisutlin	2011	3rd term
Yvonne Clarke	Yukon	Porter Creek Centre	2021	1st term
Geraldine Van Bibber	Yukon	Porter Creek North	2016	2nd term
Ranj Pillai	Liberal	Porter Creek South	2016	2nd term
Nils Clarke	Liberal	Riverdale North	2016	2nd term
Tracy-Anne McPhee	Liberal	Riverdale South	2016	2nd term
**Kate White**	New Democratic	Takhini-Kopper King	2011	3rd term
Annie Blake	New Democratic	Vuntut Gwitchin	2021	1st term
Patti McLeod	Yukon	Watson Lake	2011	3rd term
Emily Tredger	New Democratic	Whitehorse Centre	2021	1st term
Richard Mostyn	Liberal	Whitehorse West	2016	2nd term
