= Archie Lang (politician) =

Canadian politician (1948–2021)

Minister of Community Services
- In office July 3, 2008 – November 5, 2011
- Premier: Dennis Fentie; Darrell Pasloski
- Preceded by: Glenn Hart
- Succeeded by: Elaine Taylor

Minister of Highways and Public Works
- In office October 28, 2006 – November 5, 2011
- Premier: Dennis Fentie; Darrell Pasloski
- Preceded by: Glenn Hart
- Succeeded by: Wade Istchenko

Minister of Energy, Mines and Resources
- In office November 30, 2002 – July 3, 2008
- Premier: Dennis Fentie
- Preceded by: Scott Kent
- Succeeded by: Brad Cathers

MLA for Porter Creek Centre
- In office November 4, 2002 – October 11, 2011
- Preceded by: Constituency established
- Succeeded by: David Laxton

Personal details
- Born: April 2, 1948 Dawson Creek, British Columbia, Canada
- Died: March 11, 2021 (aged 72) Whitehorse, Yukon, Canada
- Party: Yukon Party

Archibald Donald Lang (April 3, 1948 – March 11, 2021) was a Canadian politician, who represented the electoral district of Porter Creek Centre in the Yukon Legislative Assembly from 2002 to 2011.

== Political career ==
He was a member of the Yukon Party and is Minister of Highways and Public Works and Minister of Community Services.

Lang announced his retirement from the legislature on July 6, 2011.

His twin brother Daniel Lang served in the Senate of Canada from 2009 to 2017. Lang died on March 11, 2021, from cancer at the age of 72.

== Electoral record ==
=== Yukon general election, 2006 ===
Porter Creek Centre
Party	Candidate	Votes	%	±%
Yukon Party	Archie Lang	344	47.3%	-4.3%
Liberal	David Laxton	224	30.8%	-9.5%
NDP	Kate White	159	21.9%	+13.8%
Total		727	100.0%	–

=== Yukon general election, 2002 ===
Porter Creek Centre
Party	Candidate	Votes	%	±%
Yukon Party	Archie Lang	399	51.6%	–
Liberal	Scott Kent	312	40.3%	–
NDP	Judi Johnny	63	8.1%	–
Total		774	100.0%	–
