= Adam Gerle =

Canadian politician

Adam Gerle MLA

Member of the Yukon Legislative Assembly for Porter Creek South
- Incumbent
- Assumed office November 3, 2025
- Preceded by: Ranj Pillai

Personal details
- Party: Yukon Party

Adam Gerle is a Canadian politician, who was elected to the Yukon Legislative Assembly in the 2025 Yukon general election. He represents the electoral district of Porter Creek South as a member of the Yukon Party.

Gerle was a brand and marketing specialist at Northern Vision Development.

On December 10, 2025 Adam Gerle was appointed to Members' Services Board, the Standing Committee on Rules, Elections and Privileges, the Standing Committee on Public Accounts, the Standing Committee on Statutory Instruments, and the Standing Committee on Appointments to Major Government Boards and Committees.

== Electoral record ==
2025 Yukon general election: Porter Creek South
Party	Candidate	Votes	%	±%
Yukon Party	Adam Gerle	493	53.13	+19.02
New Democratic	Dario Paola	373	40.19	+14.22
Liberal	Harjit Mavi	62	6.68	–33.24
Total valid votes		928		
Total rejected ballots				
Turnout			50.93	
Eligible voters		1,822		
Yukon Party gain from Liberal		Swing		+2.40
Source(s) "2025 General Election Official Results". Elections Yukon.
