= Jim Tredger =

Canadian politician

Member of the Yukon Legislative Assembly for Mayo-Tatchun
- In office October 11, 2011 – November 7, 2016
- Preceded by: Eric Fairclough
- Succeeded by: Don Hutton

Personal details
- Party: Yukon New Democratic Party

Jim Tredger is a Canadian politician, who was elected to in the Yukon Legislative Assembly in the 2011 election. He represented the electoral district of Mayo-Tatchun as a member of the Yukon New Democratic Party caucus from 2011 to 2016.

Prior to elected office, Tredger served as president of both the Association of Yukon School Administrators and the Yukon Teachers Association. He has also sat on the boards of the Canadian Association of Principals, Yukon College, United Way Yukon and Food for Learning Yukon.

During his term in office, Tredger served as the NDP critic for education, energy, mines and resources, and rural issues. He was defeated by Liberal candidate Don Hutton in the 2016 Yukon general election.

Tredger is married with four children and four grandchildren.

== Electoral record ==
=== 2016 general election ===
Mayo-Tatchun
Party	Candidate	Votes	%	±%
Liberal	Don Hutton	331	45.3%	+18.6%
NDP	Jim Tredger	233	31.9%	-9.8%
Yukon Party	Cory Bellmore	166	22.7%	-8.9%
Total		730	100.0%	–

=== 2011 general election ===
Mayo-Tatchun
Party	Candidate	Votes	%	±%
NDP	Jim Tredger	282	41.7%	+24.2%
Yukon Party	Elaine Wyatt	214	31.6%	+2.3%
Liberal	Eric Fairclough	181	26.7%	-26.5%
Total		677	100.0%	
