= Carmen Gustafson =

Canadian politician

Carmen Gustafson MLA

Member of the Yukon Legislative Assembly for Riverdale North
- Incumbent
- Assumed office November 3, 2025
- Preceded by: Nils Clarke

Personal details
- Party: Yukon New Democratic Party

Carmen Gustafson is a Canadian politician, who was elected to the Yukon Legislative Assembly in the 2025 Yukon general election. She represents the electoral district of Riverdale North as a member of the Yukon NDP.

Originally from Golden, British Columbia, she served as a councillor in the community before moving the Yukon. She was also a law student at the University of Calgary, writing essays concerning property rights.

== Electoral record ==
2025 Yukon general election: Riverdale North
Party	Candidate	Votes	%	±%
New Democratic	Carmen Gustafson	462	44.08	+10.72
Yukon Party	Rose Sellars	405	38.65	+13.73
Liberal	Mark Kelly	181	17.27	–24.45
Total valid votes		1,048		
Total rejected ballots				
Turnout			54.61	
Eligible voters		1,919		
New Democratic gain from Liberal		Swing		–1.51
Source(s) "2025 General Election Official Results". Elections Yukon.
