= Tyler Porter =

Canadian politician

Tyler Porter MLA

Member of the Yukon Legislative Assembly for Southern Lakes
- Incumbent
- Assumed office November 3, 2025
- Preceded by: John Streicker (Mount Lorne-Southern Lakes)

Personal details
- Party: Yukon Party

Tyler Porter is a Canadian politician, who was elected to the Yukon Legislative Assembly in the 2025 Yukon general election. He represents the electoral district of Southern Lakes as a member of the Yukon Party.

Porter is an emergency management professional and was the health director for Daylu Dena Council. He is also a recreation assistant and facility attendant for Teslin.

== Electoral record ==
2025 Yukon general election: Southern Lakes
** Preliminary results — Not yet official **
| Party | Candidate | Votes | % | ±% |
|---|---|---|---|---|
| Yukon Party | Tyler Porter | 269 | 44.7 | |
| New Democratic | Tip Evans | 193 | 32.1 | |
| Liberal | Cynthia James | 127 | 21.1 | |
| Independent | Jean-Michel Harvey | 13 | 2.2 | |
| Total valid votes | | 602 | | |
| Total rejected ballots | | | | |
| Turnout | | | | |
| Eligible voters | | | | |
Source(s) "Unofficial Election Results 2025". Elections Yukon.
