= Ted Laking =

Canadian politician

The Honourable Ted Laking MLA

Minister of Energy, Mines and Resources and Minister responsible for the Yukon Development Corporation and the Yukon Energy Corporation
- Incumbent
- Assumed office November 22, 2025
- Premier: Currie Dixon
- Preceded by: John Streicker

Member of the Yukon Legislative Assembly for Porter Creek Centre
- Incumbent
- Assumed office November 3, 2025
- Preceded by: Yvonne Clarke

Personal details
- Party: Yukon Party

Ted Laking is a Canadian politician, who was elected to the Yukon Legislative Assembly in the 2025 Yukon general election. He represents the electoral district of Porter Creek Centre as a member of the Yukon Party.

Laking was previously a member of the Whitehorse City Council, having served from 2021 to 2024.

== Pre-political career ==
Ted Laking grew up in Dawson City, Yukon. From 2010 to 2015, he worked at senior levels in Ottawa under Stephen Harper’s Conservative government, including as Deputy Chief of Staff and Director of Communications to Leona Aglukkaq from 2013 to 2015, managing portfolios in Health, Environment, Parks Canada, and CanNor. Returning to Yukon after the 2015 federal election, he served as Chief of Staff to the Yukon Party Official Opposition from 2016 to 2021, including managing the party's 2021 territorial campaign, which resulted in an eight-seat tie with the Liberals.

== Political career ==
=== Whitehorse City Council (2021–2024) ===
Laking was elected to Whitehorse City Council on October 21, 2021, securing one of six seats in a non-partisan election with a top-six finish. His term ended in October 2024. During his tenure, he opposed a new city hall construction project for going overbudget, advocated federal land releases for housing, suggested transforming a federal parking lot to housing in 2023, advocated for enhanced snow removal, and supported taller buildings and broader Crown land use in 2024. He also supported increased police funding and more action to address property crime, ridesharing options, Grey Mountain Cemetery access improvements, and a pedestrian-friendly Main Street pilot. Laking raised concerns with building and permitting delays, and opposed a civility policy due to concerns over freedom of speech. Additionally, he brought forward a motion in 2024 to prioritize RCMP resources for property crime. He opposed online voting for municipal elections in April 2024, citing risks of foreign interference, which led to its removal from the bylaw in May 2024.

=== Association of Yukon Communities (2022–2024) ===
On May 14, 2022, Laking was elected president of the AYC at its Annual General Meeting, defeating Angie Charlebois in a vote among approximately 150 municipal representatives. He served until May 2024, when he did not seek re-election and was succeeded by Lauren Hanchar. During his term, he co-founded the Chiefs and Mayors Forum with CYFN Grand Chief Peter Johnston in May 2023 to improve collaboration between First Nations and municipalities, supported rural land funding and sustainable growth, co-signed a budget request with the Federation of Canadian Municipalities (FCM), and backed rural EMS enhancements. As president, Laking raised concerns about rural health centre closures and staffing shortages, such as those in Pelly Crossing and Faro, calling for territorial government action.

=== Federal and Territorial Politics (2024–Present) ===
In June 2024, Laking announced he would not be seeking reelection for another term as City Councillor In July 2024, Laking announced his candidacy for the federal Conservative nomination for Yukon’s MP seat, highlighting rising costs, infrastructure deficits, and housing shortages. He withdrew on November 7, 2024, before voting took place, with no challengers announced at that point. Laking then pursued a territorial candidacy with the Yukon Party in the Porter Creek Centre riding of Whitehorse for the 2025 territorial election, helping author the party's platform. During the 2025 territorial election Laking indicated interest in reforming land development in the territory as a way to reduce housing costs.

== Electoral record ==
2025 Yukon general election: Porter Creek Centre
Party	Candidate	Votes	%	±%
Yukon Party	Ted Laking	737	65.98	+19.98
New Democratic	Hilary Smith	289	25.87	+7.09
Liberal	Louis Gagnon	91	8.15	–24.88
Total valid votes		1,117		
Total rejected ballots				
Turnout			52.05	
Eligible voters		2,146		
Yukon Party hold		Swing		+6.45
Source(s) "2025 General Election Official Results". Elections Yukon.

2021 Whitehorse municipal election: City Council
Candidate	Votes	% of Ballots
Mellisa Murray	3,546	58.7%
Michelle Friesen	3,080	51.0%
Dan Boyd	2,950	48.8%
Jocelyn Curteanu	2,857	47.3%
Ted Laking	2,601	43.0%
Kirk Cameron	2,593	42.9%
Doug Graham	2,210	36.6%
Eileen Melnychuk	1,894	31.3%
Michelle Christensen-Toews	1,892	31.3%
Dave Blottner	1,592	26.3%
Robin Reid-Fraser	1,460	24.2%
Janna Swales	1,362	22.5%
Cameron Kos	826	13.7%
Kelsey Hassard-Gammel	662	11.0%
Noah Curtis	615	10.2%
Telek Rogan	534	8.8%
Michelle Stimson	412	6.8%
Total valid ballots		6,042

Voters could select up to six candidates per ballot so the total number of votes is higher than the number of ballots. The top six candidates were elected. Percentages represent share of ballots cast.
