= Justin Ziegler =

Canadian politician

Justin Ziegler MLA

Member of the Yukon Legislative Assembly for Riverdale South
- Incumbent
- Assumed office November 3, 2025
- Preceded by: Tracy-Anne McPhee

Personal details
- Citizenship: France and since 2024 Canada as well
- Party: Yukon New Democratic Party

Justin Ziegler is a Canadian politician, who was elected to the Yukon Legislative Assembly in the 2025 Yukon general election. He represents the electoral district of Riverdale South as a member of the Yukon New Democratic Party.

== Early life ==
Born and raised in France, Ziegler was trained in jazz dance in his youth, and was a professional dancer prior to moving to Canada in 2018.

== Life in Yukon, Canada ==
Settling in Whitehorse, he taught jazz dance classes, and later cofounded ZGB Productions, a performing arts collective.

He has also worked in administration for Northerners Taking Flight, an aviation training program, and as an air ambulance coordinator for Alkan Air, and has served on the boards of the Association Franco-Yukonnaise and the Yukon Imagination Library.

== Electoral record ==
2025 Yukon general election: Riverdale South
Party	Candidate	Votes	%	±%
New Democratic	Justin Ziegler	434	44.42	+12.79
Yukon Party	Aurora Viernes	339	34.70	+5.63
Liberal	Sunny Patch	204	20.88	–18.42
Total valid votes		977		
Total rejected ballots				
Turnout			49.95	
Eligible voters		1,956		
New Democratic gain from Liberal		Swing		+3.58
Source(s) "2025 General Election Official Results". Elections Yukon.
