= Doris Anderson (politician) =

Canadian politician

Doris Anderson MLA

Member of the Yukon Legislative Assembly for Porter Creek North
- Incumbent
- Assumed office November 3, 2025
- Preceded by: Geraldine Van Bibber

Personal details
- Party: Yukon Party

Doris Anderson is a Canadian politician, who was elected to the Yukon Legislative Assembly in the 2025 Yukon general election. She represents the electoral district of Porter Creek North as a member of the Yukon Party.

Anderson has served on numerous First Nations boards, including the Assembly of First Nations Women's Council. As president of the Yukon Women's Aboriginal Council and a top member of the Yukon Native Women Association, she received a medal in 2024, in commemoration of the territory's 100th anniversary, for her work on addressing the issue of Missing and Murdered Indigenous Women.

== Electoral record ==
2025 Yukon general election: Porter Creek North
Party	Candidate	Votes	%	±%
Yukon Party	Doris Anderson	384	53.63	+7.59
New Democratic	Chris Dunbar	265	37.01	–21.51
Liberal	Jacklyn Stockstill	67	9.36	+13.92
Total valid votes		716		
Total rejected ballots				
Turnout			40.64	
Eligible voters		1,762		
Yukon Party hold		Swing		-3.17
Source(s) "2025 General Election Official Results". Elections Yukon.
