= Jen Gehmair =

Canadian politician

The Honourable Jen Gehmair MLA

Minister of Economic Development, Tourism and Culture, the Public Service Commission, and Minister responsible for the Yukon Liquor Corporation
- Incumbent
- Assumed office November 22, 2025
- Premier: Currie Dixon
- Preceded by: Mike Pemberton (Economic Development); John Streicker (Tourism and Culture); Sandy Silver (Public Service Commission & Yukon Liquor Corporation)

Member of the Yukon Legislative Assembly for Marsh Lake-Mount Lorne-Golden Horn
- Incumbent
- Assumed office November 3, 2025
- Preceded by: John Streicker (Mount Lorne-Southern Lakes)

Personal details
- Party: Yukon Party

Jen Gehmair is a Canadian politician, who was elected to the Yukon Legislative Assembly in the 2025 Yukon general election. She represents the electoral district of Marsh Lake-Mount Lorne-Golden Horn as a member of the Yukon Party.

Prior to her election to the legislature, she was an assistant deputy minister for the territorial Ministry of Social Services. Her husband Noah is a director in the territorial Highways and Public Works department.

== Electoral record ==
2025 Yukon general election: Marsh Lake-Mount Lorne-Golden Horn
| Party | Candidate | Votes | % | ±% |
|---|---|---|---|---|
| Yukon Party | Jen Gehmair | 520 | 57.78 | +17.27 |
| New Democratic | Kevin Kennedy | 348 | 38.67 | +14.69 |
| Liberal | James Rowberry | 32 | 3.56 | –31.96 |
| Total valid votes | | 900 | | |
| Total rejected ballots | | | | |
| Turnout | | | 63.07 | |
| Eligible voters | | 1,427 | | |
| Yukon Party hold | | Swing | | +1.29 |
Source(s) "2025 General Election Official Results". Elections Yukon.
