= Paolo Gallina =

Canadian politician

Member of the Yukon Legislative Assembly for Porter Creek Centre
- In office November 7, 2016 – March 12, 2021
- Preceded by: David Laxton
- Succeeded by: Yvonne Clarke

Personal details
- Party: Yukon Liberal Party

Paolo Gallina is a Canadian politician, who was elected to the Legislative Assembly of Yukon in the 2016 election. He represented the electoral district of Porter Creek Centre as a member of the Yukon Liberal Party until his defeat in the 2021 Yukon general election.

Gallina has a background in tourism, sport management and community investment. Prior to entering territorial politics, he was the Community Investment Manager at Northwestel. He also served as Marketing Manager for the 2007 Canada Winter Games in Whitehorse and promoted Yukon culture and tourism at Canada's Northern House during the Winter Olympics in Vancouver in 2010.

Gallina was elected as MLA of Porter Creek Centre on November 7, 2016, as part of the election of a Liberal majority government in the Yukon. Gallina is currently a member of the Standing Committee on Public Accounts, the Standing Committee on Rules, Elections and Privileges, and the Standing Committee on Appointments to Major Government Boards and Committees.

Following his defeat in the legislature, he ran for and won a seat on Whitehorse City Council in the 2024 municipal election.

== Electoral record ==
2021 Yukon general election: Porter Creek Centre
Party	Candidate	Votes	%	±%
Yukon Party	Yvonne Clarke	704	41.87	+5.5%
Liberal	Paolo Gallina	643	38.25	-4.9%
New Democratic	Shonagh McCrindle	334	19.86	-0.6%
Total valid votes		1,681		
Total rejected ballots				
Turnout				
Eligible voters				
Yukon Party gain		Swing		+1.81
Source(s) "Unofficial Election Results 2021". Elections Yukon.

=== Yukon general election, 2016 ===
Porter Creek Centre
Party	Candidate	Votes	%	±%
Liberal	Paolo Gallina	452	43.3%	+11.7%
Yukon Party	Michelle Kolla	379	36.3%	-2.5%
NDP	Pat Berrel	213	20.4%	-9.3%
Total		1044	100.0%	
