= Linda Moen =

Canadian politician

Linda Moen MLA

Member of the Yukon Legislative Assembly for Mountainview
- Incumbent
- Assumed office November 3, 2025
- Preceded by: Jeanie McLean

Personal details
- Party: Yukon New Democratic Party

Linda Moen is a Canadian politician, who was elected to the Yukon Legislative Assembly in the 2025 Yukon general election. She represents the electoral district of Mountainview as a member of the Yukon New Democratic Party.

A member of the Kwanlin Dün First Nation, Moen serves as a member of its council. Before then, she was a public servant for 20 years. Moen is a member of the Public Service Alliance of Canada and was also a representative for the YT Regional Women's and Aboriginal People's Councils, respectively.

== Electoral record ==
2025 Yukon general election: Mountainview
Party	Candidate	Votes	%	±%
New Democratic	Linda Moen	517	52.43	+18.59
Yukon Party	Peter Grundmanis	362	36.71	+11.24
Liberal	Jon Weller	107	10.85	–27.36
Total valid votes		986		
Total rejected ballots				
Turnout			51.62	
Eligible voters		1,910		
New Democratic gain from Liberal		Swing		+22.98
Source(s) "2025 General Election Official Results". Elections Yukon.
