= Yvonne Clarke =

Canadian politician

The Honourable Yvonne Clarke MLA

31st Speaker of the Yukon Legislative Assembly
- Incumbent
- Assumed office December 8, 2025
- Preceded by: Jeremy Harper

Member of the Yukon Legislative Assembly for Whistle Bend North
- Incumbent
- Assumed office November 3, 2025
- Preceded by: Riding created

Member of the Yukon Legislative Assembly for Porter Creek Centre
- In office April 12, 2021 – October 3, 2025
- Preceded by: Paolo Gallina
- Succeeded by: Ted Laking

Personal details
- Party: Yukon Party

Yvonne Clarke is a Canadian politician who represents Whistle Bend North, and formerly Porter Creek Centre, on the Yukon Legislative Assembly from the Yukon Party since the 2021 general election. Clarke serves as Speaker of the Yukon Legislative Assembly since 2025. She is the first Filipino Canadian Speaker in Canadian parliamentary history.

In the 35th Legislature of Yukon, Clarke served as the Official Opposition critic for the Yukon Housing Corporation, Housing and Lot Development, the Public Service Commission, the Women and Gender Equity Directorate, and the French Language Services Directorate.

Prior to her election to the legislature, she was a businessperson and community volunteer in the Whitehorse area, including serving as president of the Canadian-Filipino Society of the Yukon and chair of the Yukon Advisory Council on Women's Issues.

== Life ==
Clarke is a Filipino Canadian and has lived in Whitehorse since 1995.

== Electoral record ==
2025 Yukon general election: Whistle Bend North
Party	Candidate	Votes	%	±%
Yukon Party	Yvonne Clarke	457	52.65	+4.53
New Democratic	Tiara Topps	304	35.02	+19.98
Liberal	Beverly Cooper	107	12.33	–24.51
Total valid votes		868		
Total rejected ballots				
Turnout			59.86	
Eligible voters		1,450		
Yukon Party notional hold		Swing		–7.73
Source(s) "2025 General Election Official Results". Elections Yukon.

2021 Yukon general election: Porter Creek Centre
Party	Candidate	Votes	%	±%
Yukon Party	Yvonne Clarke	704	41.87	+5.5%
Liberal	Paolo Gallina	643	38.25	-4.9%
New Democratic	Shonagh McCrindle	334	19.86	-0.6%
Total valid votes		1,681		
Total rejected ballots				
Turnout				
Eligible voters				
Yukon Party gain		Swing		+1.81
Source(s) "Unofficial Election Results 2021". Elections Yukon.
