= David Laxton =

Canadian politician

Speaker of the Yukon Legislative Assembly
- In office December 5, 2011 – May 10, 2016
- Preceded by: Ted Staffen
- Succeeded by: Patti McLeod

MLA for Porter Creek Centre
- In office October 11, 2011 – November 7, 2016
- Preceded by: Archie Lang
- Succeeded by: Paolo Gallina

Personal details
- Party: Yukon Party → Independent
- Occupation: Soldier

David Laxton is a Canadian politician who was elected to in the Yukon Legislative Assembly in the 2011 election. He served as the 10th Speaker of the Yukon Legislative Assembly and represented the electoral district of Porter Creek Centre on behalf of the Yukon Party until his resignation from caucus in mid-2016.

== Political career ==
Laxton originally ran under the Liberal banner in the 2006 Yukon election in the riding of Porter Creek Centre but was defeated by incumbent Yukon Party Cabinet minister Archie Lang. Following Lang's retirement, Laxton opted to run for the Yukon Party nomination in that riding for the 2011 Yukon election and was successful in his second election attempt.

Laxton was sworn in as the 10th Speaker of the Yukon Legislative Assembly on December 5, 2011. He served in that capacity until his sudden resignation as Speaker on May 10, 2016, when it was revealed that he was the subject of a sexual harassment allegation. He was also ejected from the Yukon Party and barred from seeking its nomination in the 2016 election, despite already having won the party's nomination. He sat as an Independent in the final few months of the 33rd Legislative Assembly and did not seek re-election later that year.

In 2016, he was accused of sexual assault after he hugged a woman and kissed her on the lips, twice, without her consent. He had met the woman when she was working at a restaurant and developed a long time friendship. Years later ran into her at her job as a cashier at a grocery store in Whitehorse, and gave her his card when she said "it was her last day" he offered "if you think there is something I can do to help you give me a call.". It was during a meeting at his office later that the hug and kiss happened. A Yukon court dismissed the charges in a ruling released in October 2017. He argued at his trial in August that he is by nature a physically demonstrative man, and was simply being friendly with a woman who was a long-time acquaintance. He also testified that he had been similarly physical with her in the past, and always in a friendly, non-sexual way. The complainant disagreed, and told court there had never been such contact between them, and that she had given no indication of consent before Laxton's hug and kiss at the legislative building.

Faulkner decided, based on the evidence presented at trial, that Laxton's account was more believable. "While I believe substantial portions of the complainant's testimony, I remain cautious about accepting it totally," his decision reads. "In contrast, I found Laxton's evidence quite credible. He made no attempt to deny that he had hugged and kissed the complainant. He provided a more detailed and logical account of the meeting between himself and the complainant."

== Early life ==
Laxton is a 22-year veteran of Canadian Forces—Lord Strathcona's Horse (Royal Canadians)—and the Mapping and Charting Establishment and served as a United Nations peacekeeper in three tours overseas (one in Egypt (1978/1979) and two in Bosnia 1994 and 1995). In 2009, he received commendation from the federal Minister of Veterans Affairs for his role working with Northerner veterans, the community, and commemorating the sacrifices of Canadian soldiers overseas. He is a Life Member of RCL Branch 254, a Past Member of BC/Yukon Command Executive Royal Canadian Legion, and a Past President Yukon Branch and Past National Vice President Yukon, Army Cadet League of Canada. He is also the recipient of the Queen's Diamond Jubilee Medal.

He has to two children from his first marriage. Laxton resides in Whitehorse, Yukon.

== Electoral record ==
=== 2011 general election ===
Porter Creek Centre
| Party | Candidate | Votes | % | ±% |
|---|---|---|---|---|
| Yukon Party | David Laxton | 298 | 38.5% | -8.8% |
| Liberal | Kerry Huff | 245 | 31.6% | +0.8% |
| NDP | Jean-François Des Lauriers | 230 | 29.7% | +7.8% |
| Total | | 773 | 100.0% | – |

=== 2006 general election ===
Porter Creek Centre
| Party | Candidate | Votes | % | ±% |
|---|---|---|---|---|
| Yukon Party | Archie Lang | 344 | 47.3% | -4.3% |
| Liberal | David Laxton | 224 | 30.8% | -9.5% |
| NDP | Kate White | 159 | 21.9% | +13.8% |
| Total | | 727 | 100.0% | – |

== See also ==
- List of speakers of the Yukon Legislative Assembly
