= Brent McDonald =

Canadian politician

Brent McDonald MLA

Member of the Yukon Legislative Assembly for Klondike
- Incumbent
- Assumed office November 3, 2025
- Preceded by: Sandy Silver

Personal details
- Party: Yukon New Democratic Party

Brent McDonald is a Canadian politician, who was elected to the Yukon Legislative Assembly in the 2025 Yukon general election. He represents the electoral district of Klondike as a member of the Yukon New Democratic Party.

A plant operator for Yukon Energy, McDonald served several terms as co-chair of the Robert Service School Council in Dawson City.

== Electoral record ==
2025 Yukon general election: Klondike
Party	Candidate	Votes	%	±%
New Democratic	Brent McDonald	482	52.05	+31.94
Yukon Party	Richard Nagano	444	47.95	+15.27
Total valid votes		926		
Total rejected ballots				
Turnout			47.17	
Eligible voters		1,963		
New Democratic gain from Liberal		Swing		+8.34
Source(s) "2025 General Election Official Results". Elections Yukon.
