= Linda Benoit =

Canadian politician

The Honourable Linda Benoit MLA

Minister of Highways and Public Works
- Incumbent
- Assumed office November 22, 2025
- Premier: Currie Dixon
- Preceded by: Nils Clarke

Member of the Yukon Legislative Assembly for Whistle Bend South
- Incumbent
- Assumed office November 3, 2025
- Preceded by: Riding created

Personal details
- Born: 1981 or 1982
- Party: Yukon Party

Linda Benoit is a Canadian politician and businesswoman, who was elected to the Yukon Legislative Assembly in the 2025 Yukon general election. She represents the electoral district of Whistle Bend South as a member of the Yukon Party.

She ran in the 2020 Yukon Party leadership election, placing third. She is a former party president, party treasurer, and official agent.

== Electoral record ==
2025 Yukon general election: Whistle Bend South
Party	Candidate	Votes	%	±%
Yukon Party	Linda Benoit	344	45.99	+8.54
New Democratic	Dustin McKenzie-Hubbard	302	40.37	+18.56
Liberal	Vida Pelayo	102	13.64	–27.11
Total valid votes		748		
Total rejected ballots				
Turnout			54.16	
Eligible voters		1,381		
Yukon Party notional gain from Liberal		Swing		–5.01
Source(s) "2025 General Election Official Results". Elections Yukon.
