= 2021 Yukon general election =

Canadian territorial election

← 2016	April 12, 2021	2025 →

All 19 seats to the Legislative Assembly 10 seats needed for a majority
- Turnout: 65.62% (▼10.75pp)
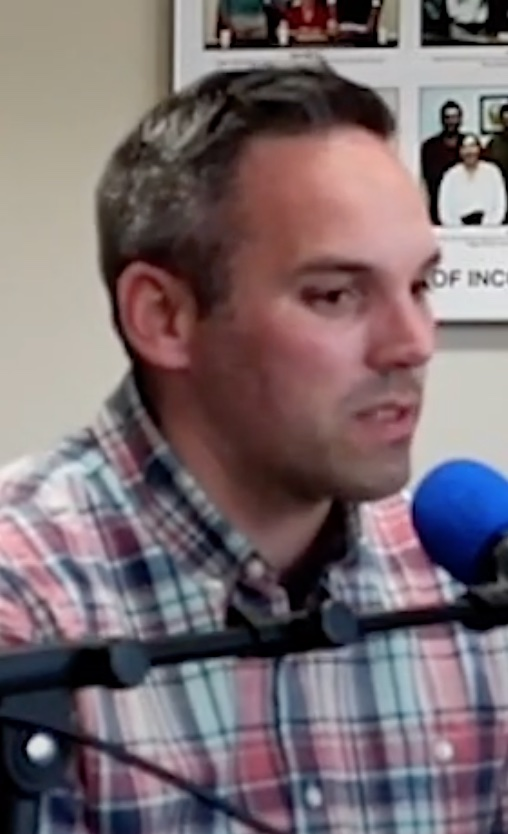

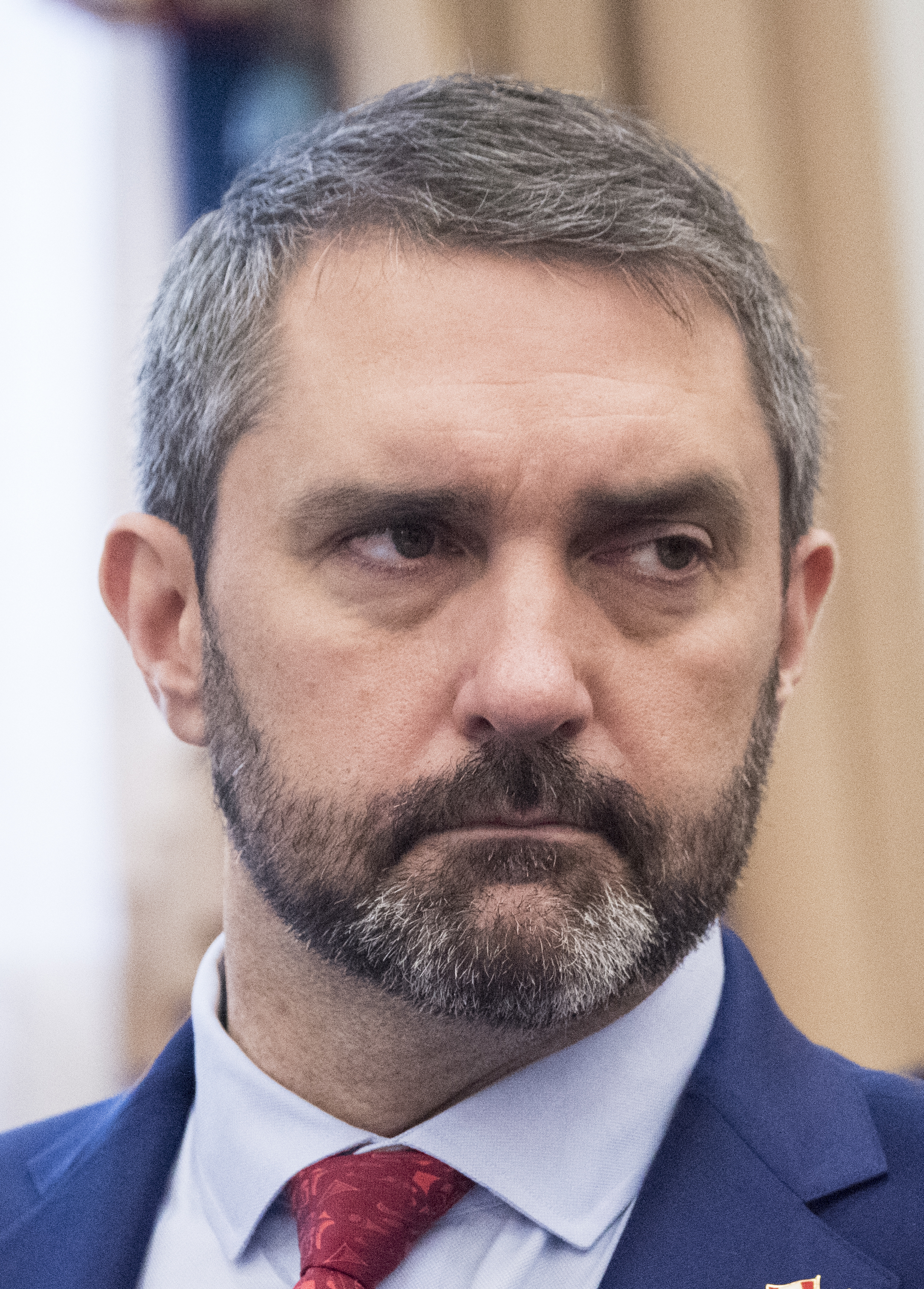

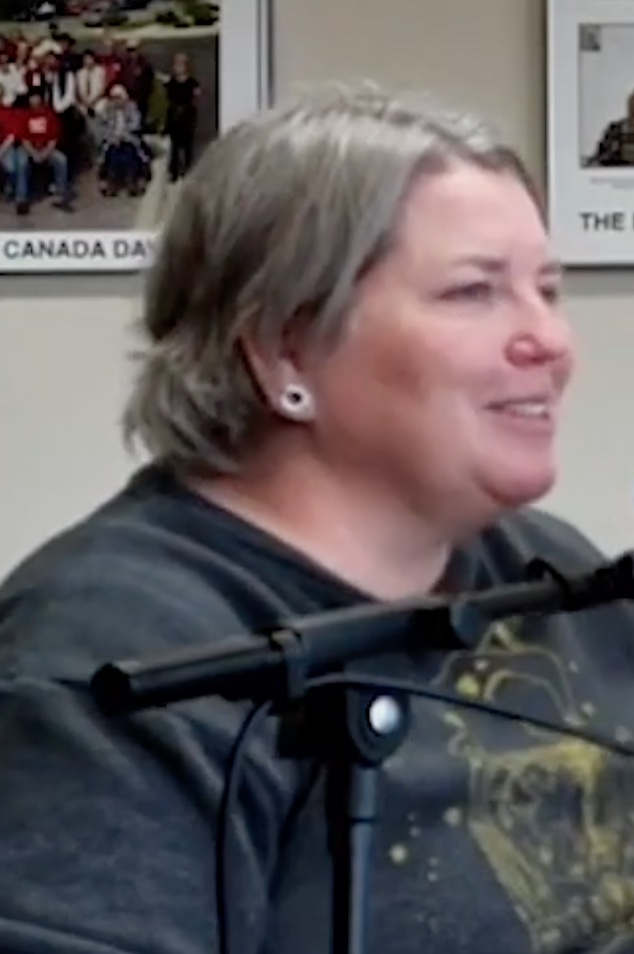
	Majority party	Minority party	Third party
Leader	Currie Dixon	Sandy Silver	Kate White
Party	Yukon Party	Liberal	New Democratic
Leader since	May 23, 2020	August 17, 2012	May 4, 2019
Leader's seat	Copperbelt North (Note: Former MLA for this riding. Not the incumbent, but stood in this seat and won.)	Klondike	Takhini-Kopper King
Last election	6 seats, 33.38%	11 seats, 39.41%	2 seats, 26.23%
Seats before	6	10	2
Seats won	8	8	3
Seat change	▲2	▼3	▲1
Popular vote	7,477	6,155	5,356
Percentage	39.32%	32.37%	28.17%
Swing	▲5.94pp	▼7.04pp	▲1.94pp
- Popular vote by riding. As this is an FPTP election, seat totals are not determined by popular vote, but instead via results by each riding.
Premier before election
Sandy Silver
Liberal
Premier after election
Sandy Silver
Liberal

The 2021 Yukon general election was held on April 12, 2021, to return members of the 35th Yukon Legislative Assembly. The election resulted in no majority where the incumbent governing Yukon Liberal Party and the opposition Yukon Party won 8 seats each, while the Yukon New Democratic Party held the remaining 3. As the incumbent party given the first opportunity to form government, a Liberal minority government was sworn in on April 23, 2021. The Liberals and NDP announced the establishment of a formal confidence and supply agreement on April 28, 2021.

During the 2016 election, the Liberals included a commitment in their platform to introduce fixed election dates in the territory. In October 2020, the government introduced legislation to amend the Elections Act and create fixed election dates. The legislation passed in December 2020, and took effect after the 2021 election.

Voter turnout dropped almost twelve percentage points compared to 2016, caused to an extent by the introduction of a standing List of Electors, resulting in a higher percentage of Yukoners being registered. More votes were cast than in 2016, in part due to the territory's strong population growth since the last election.

== Results ==
The final seat standing for the election was only resolved on April 19, 2021, because of a 78–78 vote tie in the Vuntut Gwitchin riding, the territory's smallest by population. After the tie was upheld by a judicial recount, drawing of lots gave the seat to the NDP's Annie Blake, denying the Yukon Liberals a one-seat plurality over the Yukon Party.

Summary of the 2021 Legislative Assembly of Yukon election results
Party	Votes	%	+/–	Seats			
Party	Votes	%	+/–	2016	Dissolution	Elected	Change
Yukon Party	7,477	39.32	+5.84	6	6	8	+2
Liberal	6,155	32.37	-7.04	11	10	8	-3
New Democratic	5,356	28.17	+1.94	2	2	3	+1
Independents	26	0.14	-0.06	0	1	0	±0
Total	19,014	100.00	–	19	19	19	0
Valid votes	19,014	99.56					
Invalid/blank votes	84	0.44					
Total votes	19,098	100.00					
Registered voters/turnout	29,637	64.44					

Popular vote
Yukon	39.32%
Liberal	32.37%
New Democratic	28.17%
Independent	0.14%

Seats summary
Yukon Party	42.11%
Liberal	42.11%
New Democratic	15.78%

== Results by Riding ==
Each candidate stands in a single electoral district.

Bold indicates party leaders and cabinet members are italicized
† - denotes a retiring incumbent MLA

=== Rural Yukon ===
Electoral district	Candidates			Incumbent
Electoral district	Liberal	Yukon	NDP	Incumbent
Klondike	**Sandy Silver**; 526 (47.2%)	Charlie Dagostin; 364 (32.7%)	Chris Clarke; 224 (20.1%)	**Sandy Silver**
Kluane	Luke Campbell; 219 (28.0%)	Wade Istchenko; 352 (45.0%)	Dave Weir; 211 (27.0%)	Wade Istchenko
Lake Laberge	Tracey Jacobs; 229 (17.8%)	Brad Cathers; 799 (62.1%)	Ian Angus; 259 (20.1%)	Brad Cathers
Mayo-Tatchun	Jeremy Harper; 238 (37.7%)	Peter Grundmanis; 186 (29.4%)	Patty Wallingham; 208 (32.9%)	Don Hutton†
Mount Lorne-Southern Lakes	John Streicker; 446 (39.0%)	Eric Schroff; 406 (35.5%)	Erik Pinkerton; 292 (25.5%)	John Streicker
Pelly-Nisutlin	Katherine Alexander; 97 (13.6%)	Stacey Hassard; 362 (50.8%)	George Bahm; 254 (35.6%)	Stacey Hassard
Vuntut Gwitchin	Pauline Frost; 78 (50.0%)		Annie Blake; 78 (50.0%)	Pauline Frost
Watson Lake	Amanda Brown; 237 (43.1%)	Patti McLeod; 313 (56.9%)		Patti McLeod

In Vuntut Gwitchin, both candidates each received 78 votes, resulting in a tie. A judicial recount took place and there remained a tie vote. Therefore, a random draw determined that Annie Blake would fill the seat.

=== Whitehorse ===
Electoral district	Candidates				Incumbent
Electoral district	Liberal	Yukon	NDP	Independent	Incumbent
Copperbelt North	Ted Adel; 346 (25.1%)	**Currie Dixon**; 717 (51.9%)	Saba Javed; 318 (23.0%)		Ted Adel
Copperbelt South	Sheila Robertson; 259 (20.3%)	Scott Kent; 726 (57.0%)	Kaori Torigai; 289 (22.7%)		Scott Kent
Mountainview	Jeanie McLean; 402 (38.2%)	Ray Sydney; 268 (25.5%)	Michelle Friesen; 356 (33.8%)	Coach Jan Prieditis; 26 (2.5%)	Jeanie McLean
Porter Creek Centre	Paolo Gallina; 646 (38.4%)	Yvonne Clarke; 704 (41.8%)	Shonagh McCrindle; 334 (19.8%)		Paolo Gallina
Porter Creek North	Staci McIntosh; 331 (28.9%)	Geraldine Van Bibber; 562 (49.2%)	Francis van Kessel; 250 (21.9%)		Geraldine Van Bibber
Porter Creek South	Ranj Pillai; 309 (47.2%)	Chad Sjodin; 262 (40.0%)	Colette Acheson; 84 (12.8%)		Ranj Pillai
Riverdale North	Nils Clarke; 469 (41.7%)	Cory Adams; 280 (24.9%)	Vanessa Thorson; 375 (33.4%)		Nils Clarke
Riverdale South	Tracy-Anne McPhee; 415 (39.3%)	Cynthia Lyslo; 307 (29.1%)	Jason Cook; 334 (31.6%)		Tracy-Anne McPhee
Takhini-Kopper King	Raj Murugaiyan; 198 (16.4%)	Morgan Yuill; 244 (20.3%)	**Kate White**; 763 (63.3%)		**Kate White**
Whitehorse Centre	Dan Curtis; 312 (29.5%)	Eileen Melnychuk; 249 (23.5%)	Lane Tredger; 498 (47.0%)		Liz Hanson†
Whitehorse West	Richard Mostyn; 398 (39.7%)	Angela Drainville; 376 (37.5%)	Ron Davis; 229 (22.8%)		Richard Mostyn

The Yukon Green Party did not run any candidates in the election; as a result, the party has been deregistered by Elections Yukon.

=== Incumbent MLAs who were defeated ===
Party	Name	Constituency	Year elected	Seat held by party since	Defeated by	Party
Liberal	Ted Adel	Copperbelt North	2016	2016	Currie Dixon	Yukon
Liberal	Paolo Gallina	Porter Creek Centre	2016	2016	Yvonne Clarke	Yukon
Liberal	Pauline Frost	Vuntut Gwitchin	2016	2016	Annie Blake	NDP

== Opinion polls ==
Polling firm	Last date of polling	Link	Liberal	Yukon	NDP	Green	Other	Margin of error	Sample size	Polling method	Lead
Léger	February 7, 2021	HTML	31	32	33	-	4		600	phone	1
DataPath Systems	December 20, 2017	HTML	47	36	11	5	1	±4.8 pp	424	online	11
Election 2016	November 7, 2016	PDF	39.4	33.4	26.2	0.8	0.2				6

== Aftermath ==
The election resulted in a hung parliament, with no party winning the requisite 10 seats to form a majority in the legislature. The Yukon Party and the Liberals, with 8 seats each, entered discussions with the NDP to determine support for a minority government. The Liberals, as the incumbent governing party, were given the opportunity to continue as government and test the confidence of the legislature. The Yukon Party publicly stated that they were not included in any talks to form a coalition government or provide other support to the Liberals, while the NDP did not indicate the content of their leader's discussion with the Liberals. On April 28, 2021, the Liberals and NDP announced a formal confidence and supply agreement to allow the Liberals to form a minority government.

Following the tie vote in Vuntut Gwitchin, which declared NDP candidate Annie Blake as the winner following the drawing of lots, outgoing Liberal MLA Pauline Frost filed a legal challenge challenging the results; Frost initially claimed that two votes had been counted from the district that "should not have been cast." Only one vote was actually formally challenged by Frost in court, on the grounds that as a prisoner in the Whitehorse Correctional Centre the voter should have registered to vote in Whitehorse rather than his home community; the challenge was rejected by Suzanne Duncan of the Supreme Court of Yukon in August, affirming Blake's victory.
