= Don Hutton =

Canadian politician

Member of the Yukon Legislative Assembly for Mayo-Tatchun
- In office November 7, 2016 – March 12, 2021
- Preceded by: Jim Tredger
- Succeeded by: Jeremy Harper

Personal details
- Party: Yukon Liberal Party (2016-2021); Independent (2021-present)

Don Hutton is a Canadian politician, who was elected to the Legislative Assembly of Yukon in the 2016 election. He represented the electoral district of Mayo-Tatchun, first as a Liberal from 2016 to 2021 and then as an independent for the final few days of his term, until his retirement following the 2021 election.

Hutton served a 34-year career in forestry as a wildland firefighter and has worked with the federal government as a resource management officer. He also has worked for First Nation of Na-Cho Nyäk Dun where he helped establish their Lands and Resources Department and later served as their director of the Lands and Resources Department. Hutton is the former mayor of Mayo, Yukon.

On January 12, 2017, Hutton was elected deputy speaker of the Yukon Legislative Assembly. Hutton was also a member of the Standing Committee on Public Accounts, the Standing Committee on Rules, Elections and Privileges, the Standing Committee on Statutory Instruments and the Standing Committee on Appointments to Major Government Boards and Committees.

On March 8, 2021, Hutton left the Liberal Party to sit as an independent. He did not run for re-election in the 2021 Yukon general election.

== Electoral record ==
=== 2016 general election ===
Mayo-Tatchun
| Party | Candidate | Votes | % | ±% |
|---|---|---|---|---|
| Liberal | Don Hutton | 331 | 45.3% | +18.6% |
| NDP | Jim Tredger | 233 | 31.9% | -9.8% |
| Yukon Party | Cory Bellmore | 166 | 22.7% | -8.9% |
| Total | | 730 | 100.0% | – |
