= Debra-Leigh Reti =

Canadian politician

Debra-Leigh Reti MLA

Member of the Yukon Legislative Assembly for Vuntut Gwitchin
- Incumbent
- Assumed office November 3, 2025
- Preceded by: Annie Blake

Interim Leader of the Yukon Liberal Party
- Incumbent
- Assumed office January 21, 2026
- Preceded by: Mike Pemberton

Personal details
- Party: Yukon Liberal

Debra-Leigh Reti is a Canadian politician, who was elected to the Yukon Legislative Assembly in the 2025 Yukon general election, having received 52 votes. She represents the electoral district of Vuntut Gwitchin as a member of the Yukon Liberal Party. She was the only member of the Liberal Party elected in the election.

Reti was previously a member of the Vuntut Gwitchin First Nation council, serving as deputy chief. She has worked as the First Nations cultural coordinator for the Yukon University. Following Mike Pemberton's resignation as Liberal leader in January 2026, Reti became the interim leader of the party.

== Electoral record ==
2025 Yukon general election: Vuntut Gwitchin
Party	Candidate	Votes	%	±%
Liberal	Debra-Leigh Reti	52	39.69	-10.31
New Democratic	Annie Blake	45	34.35	-15.65
Yukon Party	Sandra Charlie	34	25.95	New
Total valid votes		131		
Total rejected ballots				
Turnout			68.23	
Eligible voters		192		
Liberal gain from New Democratic		Swing		+2.67
Source(s) "Recount confirms Liberal win in Yukon's Vuntut Gwitchin riding". CBC News.
