= Yukon Party leadership elections =

The Yukon Party, a political party in the Canadian territory of Yukon, has chosen most of its leaders by delegated leadership conventions.

== 2011 leadership election ==
On May 28, 2011, a leadership election was held to replace Dennis Fentie. Darrell Pasloski was chosen after only one ballot.

Candidate	Votes	Percentage
Darrell Pasloski	767	61.3%
Rod Taylor	436	34.9%
Jim Kenyon	48	3.8%
TOTAL	1,251	100.0%

== 2020 leadership election ==
On November 20, 2019, the party announced that it would hold a leadership election on May 23, 2020. On March 25, party president Mark Beese announced that the voting will take place over phone and online due to the COVID-19 pandemic. Currie Dixon was elected with 50.44% of the vote on the second ballot. Dixon took 752 votes to 682 for Brad Cathers. On the first ballot, Dixon fell short of a majority, with 694 votes to Cathers' 637. Longtime party staffer Linda Benoit finished third with 160 votes.

== See also ==
- leadership convention
- Yukon Party
