= 2025 Yukon general election =

Canadian territorial election

- November 3, 2025

All 21 seats to the Yukon Legislative Assembly 11 seats needed for a majority
- Opinion polls
- Turnout: 53.07% (▼12.55pp)

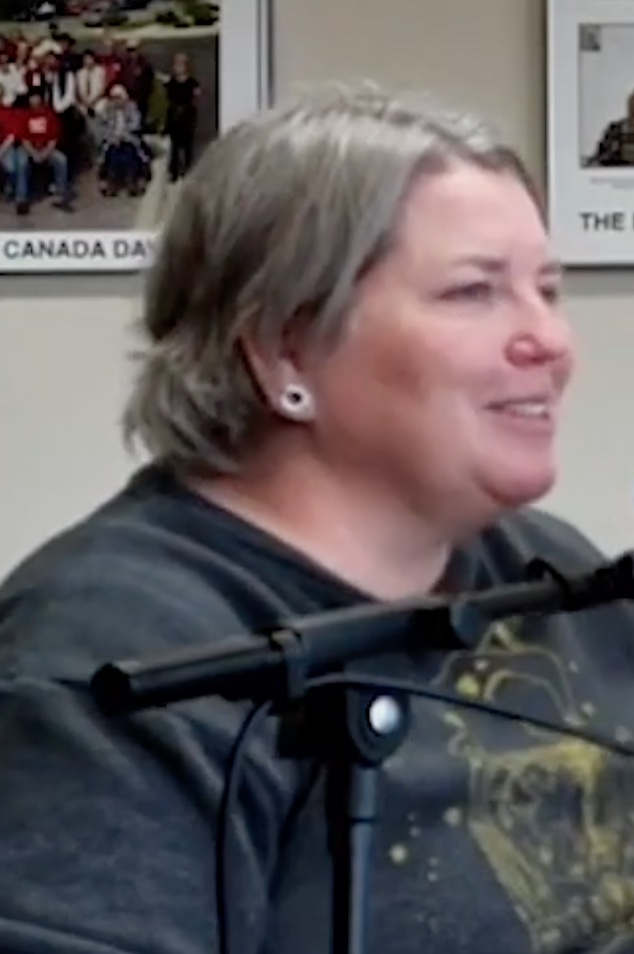
	Majority party	Minority party	Third party
			YLP
Leader	Currie Dixon	Kate White	Mike Pemberton
Party	Yukon Party	New Democratic	Liberal
Leader since	May 23, 2020	May 4, 2019	June 19, 2025
Leader's seat	Copperbelt North	Takhini	Ran in Whitehorse West (lost)
Last election	8 seats, 39.32%	3 seats, 28.17%	8 seats, 32.37%
Seats before	8	3	8
Seats won	14	6	1
Seat change	▲6	▲3	▼7
Popular vote	9,798	7,132	1,924
Percentage	51.93%	37.80%	10.20%
Swing	▲12.61pp	▲9.63pp	▼22.17pp
- Popular vote by riding. As this is an FPTP election, seat totals are not determined by popular vote, but instead via results by each riding.
Premier before election
Mike Pemberton
Liberal
Premier after election
Currie Dixon
Yukon Party

The 2025 Yukon general election was held on November 3, 2025, to elect members to the 36th Legislature of Yukon. A plebiscite on electoral reform was also held in conjunction with the general election.

Currie Dixon led the Yukon Party to a majority government for the first time since 2011, with the party winning 14 seats, the largest caucus for any party in Yukon history, as well as 51.9% of the vote, the party's best ever result and the first time any party won a majority of the vote since the adoption of a multi-party electoral system starting with the 1978 election. With 66.6% of the territorial legislature's seats, the Yukon Party had one of the largest percentage of MLAs in the legislature in Yukon's history, tied with the 2002 election, with only 1978's total (when 68.75% of the MLAs were part of the Yukon Party, then known as the Yukon Progressive Conservative Party) being slightly larger. Dixon also became the first Yukon-born premier of the territory. Kate White's New Democratic Party (NDP) won 6 seats and 37.8% of the vote, achieving its best result since 1996, the last time the party won government, and forming the official opposition. The incumbent Liberal Party, led by Mike Pemberton, recorded one of its worst results in party history, with Pemberton losing in his riding and the party coming in first in only one riding that was ordered for a mandatory recount due to the close result. Pemberton lost his own election contest.

Turnout for the election was 53.09%, the lowest in Yukon's history since the adoption of the modern election system in the territory in 1978. The election also resulted in more women being elected than men for the first time, with 11 out of the 21 elected MLAs being women, and a twelfth non-male MLA, Lane Tredger, being non-binary.

The plebiscite recorded a majority in favour of switching to ranked-choice voting (instant-runoff voting), with 56 per cent in favour and 44 per cent opposed. Despite the result of the plebiscite, the Yukon Party government, which was elected in this election, has not made the change from the FPTP system.

== Background ==
Under amendments to the territorial Elections Act passed in 2020, the first fixed election date following the 2021 Yukon general election was set as November 3, 2025. All subsequent elections will take place on the first Monday in November of the fourth calendar year following the previous election. The legislative assembly was dissolved by order of the Commissioner of Yukon on the advice of the premier on October 3, 2025. This election will elect an expanded legislature of two more seats, due to population growth in the territory.

In view of the population changes across the territory, the Yukon Electoral District Boundaries Commission was set up to redraw the constituencies to balance the discrepancy of the population each MLA represents. In their final report, a two-seat expansion of the size of the assembly (from 19) was recommended, with both new ridings located in Whitehorse. This was to reflect the city's significantly greater population growth than the average of the territory in over a decade. The final proposal was approved by MLAs in November 2024 and took effect at the 2025 election.

All incumbent Liberal cabinet ministers declined to seek re-election; Speaker Jeremy Harper was the only Liberal MLA who sought re-election, but was ultimately defeated by Yukon Party candidate Cory Bellmore.

== Timeline ==
- April 12, 2021 – The Yukon Liberal Party under Sandy Silver won a minority government in the 2021 Yukon general election.
- April 28, 2021 – The Yukon New Democratic Party announced that they had entered into a formal confidence and supply agreement with the Liberals.
- November 15, 2021 – The Yukon Freedom Party registers as a political party with Elections Yukon.
- September 9, 2022 – Sandy Silver announced his intention to resign as premier and party leader, staying on until the party elects a successor.
- January 9, 2023 – Silver was succeeded by Ranj Pillai. Pillai was acclaimed as Liberal leader and became premier on January 14.
- May 7, 2025 – Pillai announced his decision to not seek re-election and resign as party leader.
- June 19, 2025 – Businessman Mike Pemberton was elected to succeed Pillai; he did not hold a seat in the legislature before the election. Pemberton became premier on June 27.
- October 3, 2025 – Premier Pemberton asked the Commissioner to dissolve the Legislative Assembly for a general territorial election, scheduled for November 3, 2025.

=== Incumbents not standing for re-election ===
Member of the Legislative Assembly	Electoral District	Date announced
Sandy Silver	Klondike	September 9, 2022
Geraldine Van Bibber	Porter Creek North	January 28, 2025
Ranj Pillai	Porter Creek South	May 7, 2025
Stacey Hassard	Pelly-Nisutlin	July 2, 2025
Richard Mostyn	Whitehorse West	July 30, 2025
Nils Clarke	Riverdale North	August 1, 2025
Jeanie McLean	Mountainview	August 15, 2025
John Streicker	Mount Lorne-Southern Lakes	August 22, 2025
Tracy-Anne McPhee	Riverdale South	September 10, 2025

== Campaign ==
Prior to the drawing up of the writ, the Yukon Party became the first party to launch its campaign for the election on May 6, 2025. The NDP launched their campaign on September 11, and the Liberals launched their campaign on October 2. Issues in the election include rising territorial debt, healthcare, crime, the cost-of-living, and housing. The CBC's leaders' forum was held on October 23, hosted by Chris Windeyer.

=== Party slogans ===
Party	Slogan	Ref.
█ Yukon Party	"Change Starts Now"	
█ Liberal	"Real action. Real results."	
█ New Democratic	"You Can Count on Kate"	

== Opinion polling ==
Polling firm	Client	Last date of polling	Link	Liberal	Yukon	NDP	Other	Margin of error	Sample size	Polling method	Lead
Forum Research	—N/a	November 1, 2025	PDF	11.9	48.1	39.1	0.8	4.0%	697	IVR	9
Pollara	Canadian Labour Congress	October 26, 2025	HTML	11	52	34	3	4.4%	502	phone	18
Léger	Yukon Party	August 27, 2025	HTML	25	43	30	1	4.4%	500	phone	13
Léger	Yukon Party	January 30, 2025	HTML	23	41	34	1	4.4%	500	phone	7
Léger	Yukon Party	January 24, 2024	HTML	20	44	35	1	4.35%	500	phone	9
Léger	Yukon Party	September 21, 2022	HTML	23	45	30	2	4.35%	500	phone	15
Election 2021		April 12, 2021		32.37	39.32	28.17	0.14		19,098		6.95

== Results ==
=== Summary ===
The final seat standing for the election was only resolved on November 12, 2025, because the close margin in Vuntut Gwitchin triggered an automatic recount. The initial count had Liberal candidate Debra-Leigh Reti at 52 votes, compared to New Democratic candidate Annie Blake at 45. The recount was conducted on November 12, which confirmed the initial count and declared Reti elected.

Summary of the 2025 Yukon general election
Party	Votes	%	+/–	Seats			
Party	Votes	%	+/–	2021	Dissolution	Elected	Change
Yukon Party	9,798	51.93	▲12.61pp	8	8	**14**	▲6
New Democratic	7,132	37.80	▲9.63pp	3	3	**6**	▲3
Liberal	1,924	10.20	▼22.17pp	8	8	**1**	▼7
Independent	13	0.07	▼0.07pp	0	0	0	0
**Total**	**18,867**	**100.00**	–	**19**	**19**	**21**	–
Valid votes	18,867	98.85					
Invalid/blank votes	219	1.15					
Total votes	**19,086**	**100.00**					
Registered voters/turnout	35,962	53.07					

=== Results by district ===
Bold indicates party leaders
† – denotes a retiring incumbent MLA
‡ – running for re-election in different riding

==== Rural Yukon ====
Electoral district	Candidates				Incumbent
Electoral district	Yukon	Liberal	NDP	Independent	Incumbent
Klondike	Richard Nagano; 444; 47.95%		Brent McDonald; 482; 52.05%		Sandy Silver†
Kluane	Wade Istchenko; 435; 56.06%		John Vandermeer; 341; 43.94%		Wade Istchenko
Lake Laberge	Brad Cathers; 948; 71.93%	Tom Amson; 64; 4.86%	Kai Miller; 306; 23.22%		Brad Cathers
Mayo-Tatchun	Cory Bellmore; 315; 45.99%	Jeremy Harper; 288; 42.04%	Colin Prentice; 82; 11.97%		Jeremy Harper
Marsh Lake-Mount Lorne-Golden Horn	Jen Gehmair; 520; 57.78%	James Rowberry; 32; 3.56%	Kevin Kennedy; 348; 38.67%		John Streicker†; Mount Lorne-Southern Lakes
Southern Lakes	Tyler Porter; 269; 44.68%	Cynthia James; 127; 21.10%	Tip Evans; 193; 32.06%	Jean-Michel Harvey; 13; 2.16%	New District
Watson Lake-Ross River–Faro	Patti McLeod; 409; 53.19%	Lael Lund; 75; 9.75%	Josie O'Brien; 285; 37.06%		Stacey Hassard†; Pelly-Nisutlin
Watson Lake-Ross River–Faro	Patti McLeod; 409; 53.19%	Lael Lund; 75; 9.75%	Josie O'Brien; 285; 37.06%		Merged District
Watson Lake-Ross River–Faro	Patti McLeod; 409; 53.19%	Lael Lund; 75; 9.75%	Josie O'Brien; 285; 37.06%		Patti McLeod; Watson Lake
Vuntut Gwitchin	Sandra Charlie; 34; 25.95%	Debra-Leigh Reti; 52; 39.67%	Annie Blake; 45; 34.35%		Annie Blake

==== Whitehorse ====
Electoral district	Candidates			Incumbent
Electoral district	Yukon	Liberal	NDP	Incumbent
Copperbelt North	**Currie Dixon**; 760; 68.35%		Matthew Lien; 352; 31.65%	**Currie Dixon**
Copperbelt South	Scott Kent; 787; 66.47%	Derek Yap; 60; 5.10%	Robin Reid-Fraser; 337; 28.46%	Scott Kent
Mountainview	Peter Grundmanis; 362; 36.71%	Jon Weller; 107; 10.85%	Linda Moen; 517; 52.43%	Jeanie McLean†
Porter Creek Centre	Ted Laking; 737; 65.98%	Louis Gagnon; 91; 8.15%	Hilary Smith; 289; 25.87%	Yvonne Clarke‡
Porter Creek North	Doris Anderson; 384; 53.63%	Jacklyn Stockstill; 67; 9.36%	Chris Dunbar; 265; 37.01%	Geraldine Van Bibber†
Porter Creek South	Adam Gerle; 493; 53.13%	Harjit Mavi; 62; 6.68%	Dario Paola; 373; 40.19%	Ranj Pillai†
Riverdale North	Rose Sellars; 405; 38.64%	Mark Kelly; 181; 17.27%	Carmen Gustafson; 462; 44.17%	Nils Clarke†
Riverdale South	Aurora Viernes; 339; 34.70%	Sunny Patch; 204; 20.88%	Justin Ziegler; 434; 44.42%	Tracy-Anne McPhee†
Takhini	Logan Freese; 391; 35.32%	Abdullah Khalid; 89; 8.04%	**Kate White**; 627; 56.64%	**Kate White**; Takhini-Kopper King
Whistle Bend North	Yvonne Clarke; 457; 52.65%	Beverly Cooper; 107; 12.33%	Tiara Topps; 304; 35.37%	New District
Whistle Bend South	Linda Benoit; 344; 45.99%	Vida Pelayo; 102; 13.66%	Dustin McKenzie-Hubbard; 302; 40.37%	New District
Whitehorse Centre	Keith Jacobsen; 350; 41.08%	Mellisa Kwok; 77; 9.04%	Lane Tredger; 425; 49.88%	Lane Tredger
Whitehorse West	Laura Lang; 615; 55.06%	**Mike Pemberton**; 139; 12.44%	Katherine McCallum; 363; 32.50%	Richard Mostyn†

=== Victory margins ===
Winners ranked by percentage-point margin of victory
Rank	Candidate	Party	Riding	Percentage-point margin	Vote margin
1	Brad Cathers	YP	Lake Laberge	48.71	642
2	Ted Laking	YP	Porter Creek Centre	42.34	445
3	Scott Kent	YP	Copperbelt South	38.01	450
4	Currie Dixon	YP	Copperbelt North	36.70	408
5	Laura Lang	YP	Whitehorse West	22.56	252
6	Kate White	NDP	Takhini	21.32	236
7	Jen Gehmair	YP	Marsh Lake-Mount Lorne-Golden Horn	19.11	172
8	Doris Anderson	YP	Porter Creek North	16.62	119
9	Yvonne Clarke	YP	Whistle Bend North	16.55	145
10	Patti McLeod	YP	Watson Lake-Ross River–Faro	16.13	124
11	Linda Moen	NDP	Mountainview	15.72	155
12	Adam Gerle	YP	Porter Creek South	12.94	120
13	Tyler Porter	YP	Southern Lakes	12.62	76
14	Wade Istchenko	YP	Kluane	12.12	94
15	Justin Ziegler	NDP	Riverdale South	9.72	95
16	Lane Tredger	NDP	Whitehorse Centre	8.80	75
17	Linda Benoit	YP	Whistle Bend South	5.70	42
18	Carmen Gustafson	NDP	Riverdale North	5.55	58
19	Debra-Leigh Reti	Lib	Vuntut Gwitchin	5.30	7
20	Brent McDonald	NDP	Klondike	4.10	38
21	Cory Bellmore	YP	Mayo-Tatchun	3.95	27
YP: 14 seats; NDP: 5 seats; Lib: 1 seat.

Candidates with Over 50% of Votes by Riding
Candidate	Party	Riding	Vote Percentage
Brad Cathers	Yukon Party	Lake Laberge	71.93%
Currie Dixon	Yukon Party	Copperbelt North	68.35%
Ted Laking	Yukon Party	Porter Creek Centre	67.27%
Scott Kent	Yukon Party	Copperbelt South	66.47%
Jen Gehmair	Yukon Party	Marsh Lake-Mount Lorne-Golden Horn	57.78%
Kate White	NDP	Takhini	56.64%
Wade Istchenko	Yukon Party	Kluane	56.06%
Laura Lang	Yukon Party	Whitehorse West	55.06%
Doris Anderson	Yukon Party	Porter Creek North	53.63%
Patti McLeod	Yukon Party	Watson Lake-Ross River–Faro	53.19%
Adam Gerle	Yukon Party	Porter Creek South	53.13%
Linda Moen	NDP	Mountainview	52.43%
Yvonne Clarke	Yukon Party	Whistle Bend North	52.17%
Brent McDonald	NDP	Klondike	52.05%

=== Incumbents seeking re-election ===
The following table lists incumbents from the 39th Yukon Legislative Assembly who sought re-election, their parties, outcomes, and changes in personal vote share from 2021. Data is preliminary and subject to final validation.

Verified Results for Incumbents in the 2025 Yukon General Election
Incumbent Name	Party	2021 Riding	2021 Vote %	2025 Riding	2025 Vote %	Reelected	Change in Vote %
Wade Istchenko	YP	Kluane	45.00	Kluane	56.06	Yes	▲ +11.06
Brad Cathers	YP	Lake Laberge	62.10	Lake Laberge	71.93	Yes	▲ +9.83
Jeremy Harper	Lib	Mayo-Tatchun	37.70	Mayo-Tatchun	42.04	No	▲ +4.34
Patti McLeod	YP	Watson Lake	56.90	Watson Lake-Ross River–Faro	53.19	Yes	▼ -3.71
Currie Dixon	YP	Copperbelt North	51.90	Copperbelt North	68.35	Yes	▲ +16.45
Scott Kent	YP	Copperbelt South	57.00	Copperbelt South	66.47	Yes	▲ +9.47
Kate White	NDP	Takhini-Kopper King	63.30	Takhini	56.64	Yes	▼ -6.66
Yvonne Clarke	YP	Porter Creek Centre	41.80	Whistle Bend North (new)	52.17	Yes	▲ +10.37
Lane Tredger	NDP	Whitehorse Centre	47.00	Whitehorse Centre	49.88	Yes	▲ +2.88
Annie Blake	NDP	Vuntut Gwitchin	50.00	Vuntut Gwitchin	34.09	No	▼ -15.91

=== Seats that changed hands ===
The following seats changed allegiance from the 2021 redistributed results.

Liberal to NDP

- Klondike
- Mountainview
- Riverdale North
- Riverdale South

Liberal to Yukon

- Mayo-Tatchun
- Porter Creek South
- Whistle Bend South
- Whitehorse West

NDP to Liberal

- Vuntut Gwitchin

== Electoral reform plebiscite ==
2025 Yukon electoral reform plebiscite
- November 3, 2025
- Should Yukon change to a ranked voting electoral system as recommended by the Citizens' Assembly on Electoral Reform?
- Outcome: Yes

Results
Choice	Votes	%
Yes	10,186	56.18%
No	7,944	43.82%
Total votes	18,130 (Note: Unofficial results from Elections Yukon)	100.00%
- Results of the plebiscite by riding.

Following the final report from the citizen's assembly on electoral reform, the territorial government announced on September 19, 2024, that a plebiscite on adopting instant-runoff voting will be held simultaneously with the 2025 general election. The opposition Yukon Party reiterated its stance that changes to Yukon's electoral system should have to go through a referendum, while expressing its preference for First-past-the-post voting. The Yukon NDP is for the plebiscite while the Yukon Liberal Party is neutral on the matter.

According to preliminary results, the plebiscite recorded a majority in favour of switching to ranked-choice voting, with 56.18% in favour and 43.82% opposed. Despite the results of the plebiscite, the Yukon Party government has refused to change from the current FPTP system.

== Student Vote results ==
Student Vote elections are mock elections that run parallel to real elections, in which students not of voting age participate. They are administered by CIVIX Canada, in partnership with Elections Yukon. Student Vote elections are for educational purposes and do not count towards the actual results.

Summary of the 2025 Yukon Student Vote
Party	Leader	Seats			Votes		
Party	Leader	Elected	2021	±	#	%	Change (pp)
Yukon Party	Currie Dixon	7	5	▲2	701	42.83	▲14.28
New Democratic	Kate White	4	5	▼1	624	37.86	▼8.54
Liberal	Mike Pemberton	1	3	▼2	321	19.48	▼9.95
Independent		0	0	0	2	0.12	▼0.60
Vacant (Note: Nine districts did not participate.)		9	7	▲2	—N/a	—N/a	—N/a
Total votes cast		12	13	▼1	1,648	100.00	—N/a
Source: Student Vote Yukon 2025 complete results

The students also voted in a mock plebiscite, with 57.4% of the valid ballots voting yes.

== See also ==
- 2025 Canadian federal election in the territories
