= 2016 Yukon general election =

Canadian territorial election

- November 7, 2016

All 19 seats to the Legislative Assembly 10 seats needed for a majority
- Turnout: 76.37% (▲2.03pp)
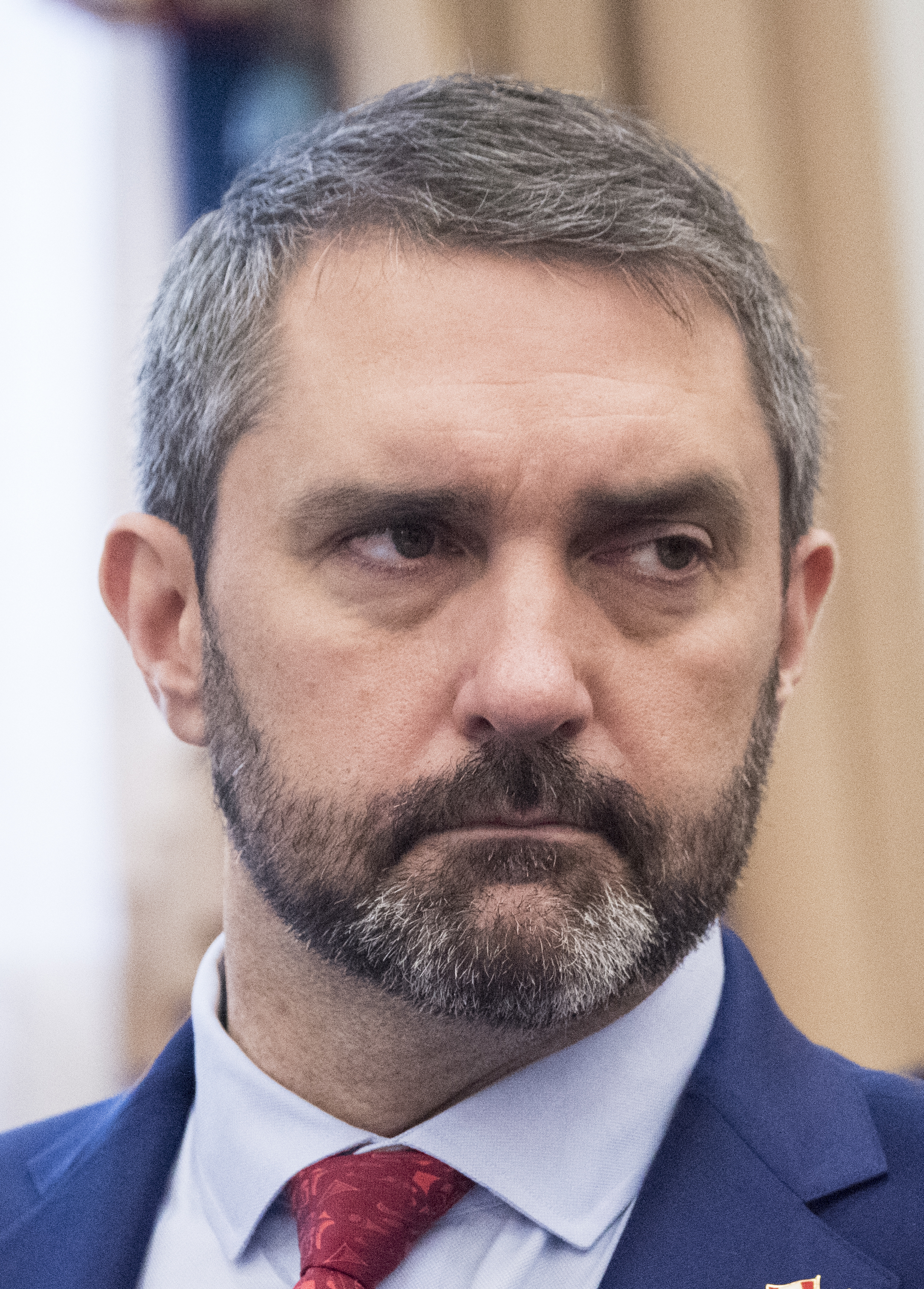

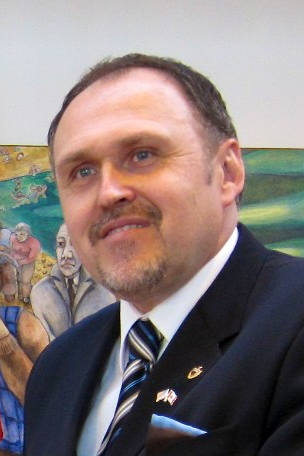

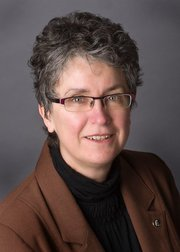
	Majority party	Minority party	Third party
Leader	Sandy Silver	Darrell Pasloski	Elizabeth Hanson
Party	Liberal	Yukon Party	New Democratic
Leader since	August 17, 2012	May 28, 2011	September 26, 2009
Leader's seat	Klondike	Mountainview (lost re-election)	Whitehorse Centre
Last election	2 seats, 25.2%	11 seats, 40.5%	6 seats, 32.6%
Seats before	1	11	6
Seats won	11	6	2
Seat change	▲10	▼5	▼4
Popular vote	7,404	6,272	4,928
Percentage	39.41%	33.38%	26.23%
Swing	▲14.08pp	▼7.06pp	▼6.34pp
- Popular vote by riding. As this is a First-Past-The-Post election, seat totals are not determined by popular vote, but instead via results by each riding. Riding names are listed at the bottom of the map.
Premier before election
Darrell Pasloski
Yukon Party
Premier after election
Sandy Silver
Liberal

The 2016 general election in Yukon, Canada, took place on November 7, 2016, to return members to the 34th Yukon legislative assembly.

The election was fought over issues relating to the economy, the environment, First Nations reconciliation, fracking, and the merits of a territorial carbon tax. Sandy Silver's Liberal Party won an upset victory over the incumbent Yukon Party government led by Darrell Pasloski, who lost his own seat in the riding of Mountainview.

== Pre-writ period ==
- August 17, 2012: Darius Elias resigns as interim Liberal leader and sits as an independent.
- July 8, 2013: Darius Elias crosses the floor to the Yukon Party.
- March 1, 2014: Sandy Silver agrees to lead the Liberal Party.
- May 10, 2016: David Laxton stepped down as Speaker and as a member of the Yukon Party caucus to sit as an independent MLA for personal reasons. It would later come out that the resignation was due to an allegation of sexual harassment leveled at Laxton. One month later, the Yukon Party would bar Laxton from running for the party in the upcoming election.
- June 8, 2016: Education Minister and veteran territorial and municipal politician Doug Graham announces he will not seek re-election in his riding of Porter Creek North.
- June 15, 2016: Currie Dixon, minister for Community Services, announces he will not seek a second term as MLA for Copperbelt North. In 2011, Dixon became the Yukon's youngest-ever cabinet minister at the age of 26.
- Aug. 11, 2016: After saying he would not run in the upcoming territorial election, Education Minister Doug Graham announced he would seek the Yukon Party nomination in Whitehorse Centre. Graham has been the Yukon Party MLA for Porter Creek North since 2011.
- October 7, 2016: Premier Darrell Pasloski calls the election for November 7, 2016, starting the official 31-day campaign period.

== 2016 Campaign ==
During the campaign, the issues of economic diversification, environmental management, and First Nations reconciliation were central themes, as was each party's stance on fracking. The announcement that the federal government would impose a national carbon tax also affected the political direction of the campaign, with the Yukon Party vowing to fight any effort to impose a carbon tax on the Yukon.

The incumbent Yukon Party, led by Darrell Pasloski since 2011, had governed the Yukon since 2002 when it defeated the Yukon Liberal Party. While the Yukon Party had been re-elected in 2011 during a commodity boom, by 2016 the Yukon economy was in a recession. Leading into the 2016 campaign, the Yukon Party was drawing criticism over its poor relationship with First Nations, its stance on the environment, access to healthcare, and a perceived mismanagement of the Yukon economy.

The Yukon Party ran on a campaign of True North. Central to this campaign was prioritizing the creation of jobs, growing the economy, and keeping taxes low. It also adamantly opposed the federal carbon tax.

The Yukon Party entered the 2016 campaign with ten of its twelve MLAs seeking re-election, albeit it with two running in different ridings (Scott Kent and Doug Graham).

The Yukon New Democratic Party, led by Liz Hanson, had been the Official Opposition since 2011. The party had been critical of the Yukon Party's relationship with First Nations, its stewardship of the economy, and its management of government services such as healthcare.

The Yukon New Democratic Party ran on a campaign of Building a Better Yukon. The party emphasized the need for a change in government, and championed causes such as improving the healthcare system, transparent government, First Nations reconciliation, and economic diversification. It supported investing a federal carbon tax in green energy and low income supports.

All six Yukon New Democratic Party MLAs sought re-election.

The Yukon Liberal Party, led by Sandy Silver, held only one seat after Darius Elias joined the Yukon Party. The Liberal platform, Be Heard, promoted economic diversification, responsible environmental management, and improving First Nations relations. The Liberals promised to return funds raised from a federal carbon tax back to Yukoners.

Despite having only one seat, the party gained visibility in late 2015 following the election the Liberal Party of Canada to a majority government; it had also been the Third Party. The Yukon Liberal Party had led in the two opinion polls prior to the election period, despite holding just one seat in the legislature – Sandy Silver's district of Klondike. The Liberals also gained attention due to a series of high-profile contested nominations that helped build the profile of their candidates and party in the lead up to the campaign.

The Yukon Green Party, led by Frank De Jong, running in its second election, championed the issue of climate change and electoral reform. It also opposed the public funding of Catholic schools. The Green Party had no incumbent MLAs leading into the election, but managed to run five candidates during the campaign.

Controversy arose when the Chief Electoral Officer launched two inquiries during the campaign, citing concerns about proxy voting, special ballots, and purposeful misinformation by all three candidates in the Mountainview riding, as well as the use of proxy votes by Liberal candidate Tamara Goeppel in the Whitehorse Centre riding. The Chief Electoral Officer eventually ruled that there was no wrongdoing in Mountainview, but her inquiry into Whitehorse Centre led the RCMP to press charges in February 2017.

The election also marked a continued trend in the turnout at advance polls, which had doubled in each of the previous two elections. In the 2016 election, advanced turnout doubled again, with 6,437 voters casting advance or special ballots. This represented more than one-in-three votes cast in the election overall (18,787).

=== Results ===
The Yukon Liberal Party was elected to a majority government on November 7, 2016, with 11/19 seats. The 2016 election resulted in one of the single-largest gain of seats for a party in Yukon history (+10), tying for the Yukon Party win of 2002. It was the Liberals' second time being elected to power in the Yukon.

The Liberals also posted their best ever returns in rural Yukon, winning four of eight rural seats. In Whitehorse, the Liberals posted their second-best returns in party history, taking seven of eleven seats (the party had swept the city in the 2000 election). However, despite winning the popular vote comfortably, many Liberal margins of victory were quite narrow.

A judicial recount was later held to confirm the results in the districts of Vuntut Gwitchin and Mountainview. It was determined that in both instances, the Liberal candidate won by seven votes.

The Yukon Party saw five of its MLAs re-elected, with one new candidate, Geraldine Van Bibber, elected. However, Premier Pasloski, Deputy Premier Elaine Taylor, and ministers Mike Nixon and Doug Graham were all defeated. The party also failed to retain two of the three seats where incumbents had not sought re-election.

The New Democratic Party lost four of its six seats, with party leader Liz Hanson and incumbent Kate White the only two re-elected. In two ridings, New Democrat incumbents lost narrowly to Liberal star candidates: Kevin Barr lost to former Whitehorse City Councillor and environmental scientist John Streicker by 14 votes in Mount Lorne-Southern Lakes and Jan Stick lost to former Ombudsman Tracy McPhee by 37 votes in Riverdale South. It was the party's worst electoral showing since 1978.

No Green Party candidate was elected.

Surprisingly, the number of individual votes received by the Yukon Party and the New Democrats was also largely unchanged; each party received only about 200 votes less than it had in 2011. The gain in Liberal support (+3,500 votes) could possibly be attributable in part to the increase in Yukon population between 2011 and 2016. In ridings where the population had increased notably in that time - Whitehorse West, Porter Creek Centre, Mount Lorne-Southern Lakes, Whitehorse Centre, Porter Creek North, Takhini-Kopper King, and Copperbelt South - Liberal support rose substantially over the last campaign. Despite this increase in votes, however, the Yukon Liberal Party still received a smaller share of the popular vote than the Yukon Party did in the 2011 election. In some of these larger ridings too, the Liberals saw a significant increase in votes, only to lose still.

Turnout was 79.9% (18,787 votes), the highest in Yukon history and the highest since 1996.

=== Campaign Donations ===
The election marked the highest-ever levels of expenditures and revenue (cash and in-kind) by the Yukon political parties in an election year. In 2016, Elections Yukon reported that the Yukon Party raised $236,015, the Yukon Liberal Party raised $233,243, the Yukon New Democrats raised $165,817, and the Yukon Green Party raised $5,948. Compared to the 2011 election, this was a drastic increase. In that campaign, the Yukon Party raised $153,892.90, the Yukon Liberal Party raised $71,159.53, the Yukon New Democrats raised $75,616.35, and the Yukon Green Party raised $575. The then-active Yukon First Nations Party raised $1,104. Nonetheless, despite a significant increase in fundraising revenue, all three major parties reported significant campaign deficits in 2016.

Overall, the Yukon Liberals benefited from the largest single corporate contribution in Yukon history of $50,000, while the Yukon Party benefited from the most corporate donations and the New Democrats from the most individual donations. Of particular interest was that the Yukon Liberal Party in 2016 raised more than five times what it raised collectively between 2011 and 2015. Nearly a quarter of the Liberals' donations came from large donations from mining companies.

=== Whitehorse Centre Investigation ===
During the 2016 campaign, Liberal candidate for Whitehorse Centre, Tamara Goeppel, was accused of soliciting proxy ballots from ten homeless people in her riding. Proxy votes, a form of franchise in which voters surrender their vote to another in their stead, are intended for use only by voters who have reason to believe they will be absent from the territory on voting day and advanced polling days.

The Chief Electoral Officer opened an investigation into Goeppel during the campaign, and despite calls to drop Goeppel as a candidate, Liberal Leader Sandy Silver continued to support her candidacy. Goeppel was defeated by New Democrat Leader Liz Hanson on election night.

In February 2017, the Chief Electoral Officer's investigation led to the RCMP charging Goeppel with two counts of "aiding or abetting persons in making proxy applications that were not in accordance with Section 106 of the (Yukon Elections) Act," and one count of "inducing persons to falsely declare on proxy application that they would be absent from the Yukon during the hours fixed for voting." If convicted, Goeppel faces a $5,000 fine, up to a year in jail, or both.

Goeppel entered a plea of not guilty in June 2017. Her trial date is not yet determined. She is the first person to be charged under the Yukon Elections Act.

== Standings ==
Summary of the 2016 Legislative Assembly of Yukon election results
Party	Votes	%	+/–	Seats			
Party	Votes	%	+/–	2011	Dissolution	Elected	Change
Liberal	7,404	39.41	+14.2	2	1	11	+9
Yukon Party	6,272	33.38	-7.1	11	11	6	-5
New Democratic	4,928	26.23	-6.4	6	6	2	-4
Green	145	0.77	+0.1	0	0	0	±0
Independents	38	0.20	-0.3	0	1	0	±0
Total	18,787	100.00	–	19	19	19	0
Valid votes	18,787	99.72					
Invalid/blank votes	53	0.28					
Total votes	18,840	100.00					
Registered voters/turnout	24,668	76.37					

Popular vote
Liberal	39.41%
Yukon Party	33.38%
New Democratic	26.23%
Green	0.77%
Others	0.20%

Seats summary
Liberal	57.89%
Yukon Party	31.58%
New Democratic	10.53%

== Candidates ==
Bold incumbents indicates cabinet members and party leaders and the speaker of the assembly are italicized.

=== Rural Yukon ===
Electoral district	Candidates					Incumbent
Electoral district	Yukon	NDP	Liberal	Green	Other	Incumbent
Klondike	Brad Whitelaw; 365 (31.4%)	Jay Farr; 111 (9.5%)	Sandy Silver; 687 (59.1%)			Sandy Silver
Kluane	Wade Istchenko; 338 (43.3%)	Sally Wright; 153 (19.5%)	Mathieya Alatini; 289 (37.1%)			Wade Istchenko
Lake Laberge	Brad Cathers; 558 (46.5%)	Anne Tayler; 261 (21.8%)	Alan Young; 342 (28.5%)	Julie Anne Ames; 38 (3.2%)		Brad Cathers
Mayo-Tatchun	Cory Bellmore; 166 (22.7%)	Jim Tredger; 233 (31.9%)	Don Hutton; 331 (45.3%)			Jim Tredger
Mount Lorne-Southern Lakes	Rob Schneider; 284 (24.2%)	Kevin Barr; 437 (37.3%)	John Streicker; 451 (38.5%)			Kevin Barr
Pelly-Nisutlin	Stacey Hassard; 280 (42.4%)	Ken Hodgins; 207 (31.3%)	Carl Sidney; 152 (23.0%)	Frank De Jong; 22 (3.3%)		Stacey Hassard
Vuntut Gwitchin	Darius Elias; 70 (46.7%)	Skeeter Wright; 3 (2.0%)	Pauline Frost; 77 (51.3%)			Darius Elias
Watson Lake	Patti McLeod; 299 (38.9%)	Erin Labonte; 219 (28.5%)	Ernie Jamieson; 212 (27.6%)		Victor Kisoun; 38 (5.0%)	Patti McLeod

=== Whitehorse ===
Electoral district	Candidates					Incumbent
Electoral district	Yukon	NDP	Liberal	Green	Other	Incumbent
Copperbelt North	Pat McInroy; 529 (42.1%)	André Bourcier; 161 (12.8%)	Ted Adel; 566 (45.1%)			Currie Dixon†
Copperbelt South	Scott Kent§ 449 (36.9%)	Lois Moorcroft; 331 (27.2%)	Jocelyn Curteanu; 425 (34.9%)	Phillipe Leblond; 12 (1.0%)		Lois Moorcroft
Mountainview	Darrell Pasloski; 399 (31.4%)	Shaunagh Stikeman; 432 (34.1%)	Jeanie Dendys; 439 (34.5%)			Darrell Pasloski
Porter Creek Centre	Michelle Kolla; 379 (36.3%)	Pat Berrel; 213 (20.4%)	Paolo Gallina; 452 (43.3%)			David Laxton†
Porter Creek North	Geraldine Van Bibber; 435 (44.0%)	Francis van Kessel; 145 (14.7%)	Eileen Melnychuk; 372 (37.6%)	Mike Ivens; 37 (3.7%)		Doug Graham§
Porter Creek South	Mike Nixon; 285 (39.4%)	Shirley Chua-Tan; 102 (14.1%)	Ranj Pillai; 337 (46.6%)			Mike Nixon
Riverdale North	Mark Beese; 258 (23.1%)	Rod Snow; 337 (30.2%)	Nils Clarke; 486 (43.5%)	Kristina Calhoun; 36 (3.2%)		Scott Kent§
Riverdale South	Danny Macdonald; 323 (28.6%)	Jan Stick; 384 (34.0%)	Tracy McPhee; 421 (37.3%)			Jan Stick
Takhini-Kopper King	Vanessa Innes; 229 (17.5%)	Kate White; 605 (46.1%)	Jeane Lassen; 478 (36.4%)			Kate White
Whitehorse Centre	Doug Graham§ 193 (17.4%)	Liz Hanson; 487 (43.8%)	Tamara Goeppel; 432 (38.9%)			Liz Hanson
Whitehorse West	Elaine Taylor; 433 (43.6%)	Stu Clark; 106 (10.7%)	Richard Mostyn; 455 (45.8%)			Elaine Taylor

§ - denotes incumbent MLAs who have opted to run in another district
† - denotes a retiring incumbent MLA

== Opinion polls ==
Polling Firm	Date of Polling	Link	Yukon	New Democratic	Liberal	Green	Undecided
2016 election	November 7, 2016		33.4%	26.2%	39.4%	0.8%	--
DataPath Systems	October 30, 2016		34%	29%	34%	3%	--
Gandalf Group	October 28, 2016		30%	24%	46%	--	--
Mainstreet Research	February 3, 2016		6%	11%	22%	--	61%
DataPath Systems	December 2015		20%	28%	32%	--	19%
2011 election	October 11, 2011	PDF	40.5%	32.6%	25.3%	0.66%	--
