= Scott Kent =

Canadian politician

The Honourable Scott Kent MLA

Minister of Education
- Incumbent
- Assumed office November 22, 2025
- Premier: Currie Dixon
- Preceded by: Jeanie McLean

Minister responsible for the Yukon Housing Corporation
- Incumbent
- Assumed office November 22, 2025
- Premier: Currie Dixon
- Preceded by: Mike Pemberton

Member of the Yukon Legislative Assembly for Copperbelt South
- Incumbent
- Assumed office November 7, 2016
- Preceded by: Lois Moorcroft
Other ministerial roles
Minister of Energy, Mines and Resources
In office August 5, 2013 – December 3, 2016
Premier	Darrell Pasloski
Preceded by	Brad Cathers
Succeeded by	Ranj Pillai
Minister of Highways and Public Works
In office April 2, 2002 – November 30, 2002
Premier	Pat Duncan
Succeeded by	Archie Lang
In office January 16, 2015 – December 3, 2016
Premier	Darrell Pasloski
Preceded by	Wade Istchenko
Succeeded by	Richard Mostyn
Minister of Education
In office November 5, 2011 – August 5, 2013
Premier	Darrell Pasloski
Preceded by	Patrick Rouble
Succeeded by	Elaine Taylor
Minister of Economic Development
In office June 12, 2001 – April 2, 2002
Premier	Pat Duncan
Preceded by	Pat Duncan
Succeeded by	Office dissolved
Parliamentary constituencies
Member of the Yukon Legislative Assembly for Riverdale North
In office October 11, 2011 – November 7, 2016
Preceded by	Ted Staffen
Succeeded by	Nils Clarke
Member of the Yukon Legislative Assembly for Riverside
In office April 17, 2000 – November 4, 2002
Preceded by	Jack Cable
Succeeded by	Constituency dissolved

Personal details
- Party: Yukon Party (2011-present); Yukon Liberal Party (2000-2002)

Scott Kent is a Canadian politician, who was elected to in the Yukon Legislative Assembly in the 2000, 2011, 2016, 2021 and 2025 Yukon elections . He currently represents the Whitehorse electoral district of Copperbelt South as a member of the Yukon Party caucus.

== Political career ==
=== 30th Legislative Assembly ===
Kent was first elected to the Yukon Legislative Assembly as MLA for Riverside on April 17, 2000, for the Yukon Liberal Party as part of the short-lived government of Premier Pat Duncan. Kent served as Deputy Chair of Committee of the Whole from June 5, 2000 to June 12, 2001. He was appointed to the Standing Committee on Public Accounts and the Standing Committee on Rules, Elections and Privileges during the 30th Legislative Assembly.

In June 2001, Kent was appointed to the Executive Council (Cabinet) as Minister of Economic Development. He later acquired responsibility for the Department of Infrastructure, the Department of Energy, Mines and Resources, and the Yukon Development Corporation/Yukon Energy Corporation. He was also the Minister responsible for Youth. Kent's riding of Riverside was dissolved prior to the 2002 election, and he opted to run for re-election in the newly created riding of Porter Creek Centre. However, he was defeated by Archie Lang of the Yukon Party.

=== 33rd Legislative Assembly ===
Kent re-entered territorial politics in 2011, when he joined the Yukon Party. He was elected in the riding of Riverdale North - which included part of his former riding of Riverside - in that year's election. He was appointed again to Cabinet on November 5, 2011, serving as Minister of Education, Minister responsible for the Yukon Housing Corporation, Minister responsible for the Yukon Liquor Corporation (including the Yukon Lottery Commission), Minister of Energy, Mines and Resources, Minister responsible for the Yukon Development Corporation and Yukon Energy Corporation, Minister of Energy, Mines and Resources, and Minister of Highways and Public Works. During his time Minister of Education, his department drew criticism for its handling of the Catholic school system's stance on homosexuality, which came to light in a school document which labeled homosexual urges a "disorder" and homosexual acts an "intrinsic moral evil.". Kent was later moved out of the education portfolio in August 2013.

Kent also served on the Standing Committee on Public Accounts, the Standing Committee on Rules, Elections and Privileges and the Standing Committee on Appointments to Major Government Boards and Committees during the 33rd Legislative Assembly.

=== 34th Legislative Assembly ===
Kent once again sought re-election in 2016, but this time in the riding of Copperbelt South. Kent received criticism for moving out of his riding, and then for not seeking re-election in his current riding and then seeking re-election in a riding that was different than the one he was moving to. Nonetheless, although the Yukon Party was defeated in the general election, Kent was elected in Copperbelt South, defeating popular Whitehorse city councillor and Liberal candidate Jocelyn Curteanu by just 24 votes.

He is currently the Yukon Party caucus critic for the Department of Education, the Department of Economic Development, and the Oil, Gas and Mineral Resources Division of the Department of Energy, Mines and Resources. He is also the Official Opposition House Leader. Kent is currently a member of the Standing Committee on Rules, Elections and Privileges.

=== 35th Legislative Assembly ===
In the 35th Legislature of Yukon, Kent served as the Official Opposition House Leader and the critic for Education and for Energy, Mines and Resources.

== Personal life ==
Outside of politics, Kent has worked in a family-owned business and for a number of organizations, including the Yukon Environmental and Socio-Economic Assessment Board (YESAB), the Yukon Chamber of Mines, the Klondike Placer Miners Association, and the Yukon Hospital Foundation.

== Electoral record ==
=== 2025 general election ===
2025 Yukon general election: Copperbelt South
Party	Candidate	Votes	%	±%
Yukon Party	Scott Kent	787	66.47	+11.13
New Democratic	Robin Reid-Fraser	337	28.46	+6.13
Liberal	Derek Yap	60	5.07	–17.26
Total valid votes		1,184		
Total rejected ballots				
Turnout			57.28	
Eligible voters		2,067		
Yukon Party hold		Swing		+2.50
Source(s) "2025 General Election Official Results". Elections Yukon.

=== 2021 general election ===
2021 Yukon general election: Copperbelt South
Party	Candidate	Votes	%	±%
Yukon Party	Scott Kent	726	56.98	+20.1
New Democratic	Kaori Torigai	289	22.68	-4.5%
Liberal	Sheila Robertson	259	20.32	-14.6%
Total valid votes		1,274		
Total rejected ballots				
Turnout				
Eligible voters				
Yukon Party hold		Swing		+18.33
Source(s) "Unofficial Election Results 2021". Elections Yukon.

=== 2016 general election ===
Copperbelt South
Party	Candidate	Votes	%	±%
Yukon Party	Scott Kent	449	36.9%	-4.8%
Liberal	Jocelyn Curteanu	425	34.9%	+18.6%
NDP	Lois Moorcroft	397	27.2%	-14.8%
Green	Philippe LeBlond	12	1.0%	+1.0%
Total		1217	100.0%	

=== 2011 general election ===
Riverdale North
Party	Candidate	Votes	%	±%
Yukon Party	Scott Kent	366	37.1%	-6.9%
New Democratic	Peter Lesniak	296	30.0%	+12.4%
Liberal	Christie Richardson	289	29.3%	-9.0%
Green	Kristina Calhoun	35	3.5%	+3.5%
Total		986	100.0%	–

=== 2002 general election ===
Porter Creek Centre
Party	Candidate	Votes	%	±%
Yukon Party	Archie Lang	399	51.6%	–
Liberal	Scott Kent	312	40.3%	–
NDP	Judi Johnny	63	8.1%	–
Total		774	100.0%	–

=== 2000 general election ===
Riverside
Party	Candidate	Votes	%	±%
Liberal	Scott Kent	359	54.3%	+15.4%
NDP	Jasbir Randhawa	202	30.6%	-7.2%
Yukon Party	Michael Weinert	100	15.1%	-8.2%
Total		661	100.0%	
