= Martha McCarthy =

Canadian lawyer

Martha McCarthy is a Canadian lawyer who specializes in LGBT issues of family law. McCarthy is best known as the counsel for M. in the landmark Supreme Court of Canada case, M. v. H. which established equal rights for same-sex couples in Canada. In 2007, McCarthy received the Excellence in Family Law award from the Ontario Bar Association.

== See also ==
- Same-sex marriage in Ontario
- Same-sex marriage in Yukon
