= Yukon Legislative Assembly =

Legislature of Yukon, Canada

Yukon Legislative Assembly Assemblée législative du Yukon
- 36th Yukon Legislative Assembly

Type
- Type: Unicameral house of the Legislature of Yukon

Leadership
- Speaker: Yvonne Clarke, Yukon since 8 December 2025
- Premier: Currie Dixon, Yukon since 22 November 2025
- Leader of the Opposition: Kate White, New Democratic since 3 November 2025

Structure
- Seats: 21
- Political groups: Government (14): Yukon (14); Official Opposition (6): New Democratic (6); Others (1): Liberal (1)

Elections
- Last election: November 3, 2025
- Next election: 2029

Meeting place
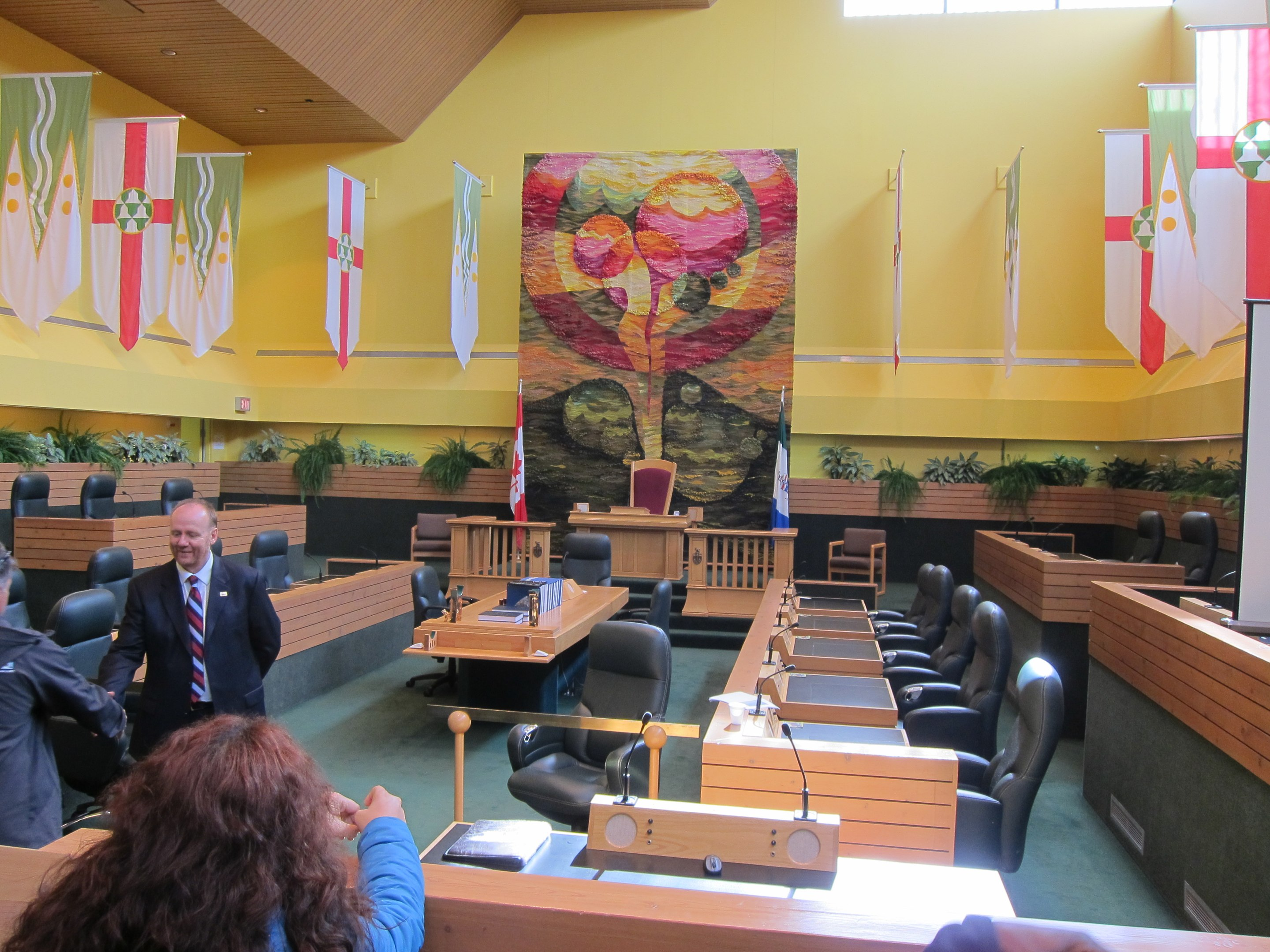
- Legislative Building; Whitehorse, Yukon, Canada

Website
- yukonassembly.ca

The Yukon Legislative Assembly (French: Assemblée législative du Yukon) is the legislative assembly for Yukon, Canada. Unique among Canada's three territories, the Yukon Legislative Assembly is the only territorial legislature which is organized along political party lines. In contrast, in Nunavut and the Northwest Territories, their legislative assemblies are elected on a non-partisan basis and operate on a consensus government model.

Each member represents one electoral district, elected through first-past-the-post voting. Members of the Legislative Assembly are sworn in by the commissioner of Yukon.

== History ==
From 1900 to 1978, the elected legislative body in Yukon was the Yukon Territorial Council, a body which did not act as the primary government, but was a non-partisan advisory body to the commissioner of the Yukon. Following the passage of the Yukon Elections Act in 1977, the Territorial Council was replaced by the current Legislative Assembly, which was elected for the first time in the 1978 Yukon general election.

== Current members ==
Italicized text indicates a member of cabinet. Bold text indicates a party leader. Both indicates the Premier of Yukon

Name	Party	Riding	First elected / previously elected	No. of terms
**Currie Dixon**	Yukon	Copperbelt North	2011, 2021	3rd term*
Scott Kent	Yukon	Copperbelt South	2000, (Note: Riverside (First elected as a Liberal)) 2011	5th term*
Brent McDonald	New Democratic	Klondike	2025	1st term
Wade Istchenko	Yukon	Kluane	2011	4th term
Brad Cathers	Yukon	Lake Laberge	2002	6th term
Cory Bellmore	Yukon	Mayo-Tatchun	2025	1st term
Jen Gehmair	Yukon	Marsh Lake-Mount Lorne-Golden Horn	2025	1st term
Linda Moen	New Democratic	Mountainview	2025	1st term
Patti McLeod	Yukon	Watson Lake-Ross River-Faro	2011	4th term
Ted Laking	Yukon	Porter Creek Centre	2025	1st term
Doris Anderson	Yukon	Porter Creek North	2025	1st term
Adam Gerle	Yukon Party	Porter Creek South	2025	1st term
Carmen Gustafson	New Democratic	Riverdale North	2025	1st term
Justin Ziegler	New Democratic	Riverdale South	2025	1st term
**Kate White**	New Democratic	Takhini	2011	4th term
Debra-Leigh Reti	Liberal	Vuntut Gwitchin	2025	1st term
Tyler Porter	Yukon	Southern Lakes	2025	1st term
Lane Tredger	New Democratic	Whitehorse Centre	2021	2nd term
Laura Lang	Yukon	Whitehorse West	2025	1st term
Yvonne Clarke	Yukon	Whistle Bend North	2021	2nd term
Linda Benoit	Yukon	Whistle Bend South	2025	1st term

== Party standings ==
Party	Rural	Whitehorse	Total
Yukon	6	8	14
New Democratic	1	5	6
Liberal	1	0	1
Total	8	13	21
Government majority			3

== See also ==
- List of speakers of the Yukon Legislative Assembly
- List of Yukon general elections
- List of the Yukon Legislative Assemblies
- List of Yukon territorial electoral districts
