= Elections Yukon =

Canadian territorial elections agency

Agency overview
- Jurisdiction: Elections and plebiscites in Yukon
- Headquarters: 2071 Second Avenue; Whitehorse, Yukon
- Employees: 2
- Annual budget: $549,000
- Agency executive: H. Maxwell Harvey, Chief Electoral Officer
- Website: Official website

Elections Yukon is an independent agency that oversees elections and plebiscites in the Yukon including:

- all general elections and by-elections for the 19 members of the Yukon's Legislative Assembly, according to the Elections Act
- School board & school council elections and by-elections
- all plebiscites
