= Yukon New Democratic Party =

Territorial political party in Canada

Yukon New Democratic Party Nouveau Parti démocratique du Yukon
- Abbreviation: YNDP
- Leader: Kate White
- President: Jan Stick
- Founded: 1978; 48 years ago
- Headquarters: Whitehorse, Yukon
- Membership (2017): 503
- Ideology: Social democracy
- Political position: Centre-left
- National affiliation: New Democratic Party
- Colours: Orange
- Seats in Legislature: 6 / 21

Website
- www.yukonndp.ca

The Yukon New Democratic Party (YNDP; French: Nouveau Parti démocratique du Yukon) is a social democratic political party in the Yukon, Canada. It is the territorial section of the federal New Democratic Party. The party currently forms the official opposition in the Yukon Legislative Assembly.

== History ==
The Yukon NDP first formed the government of the territory under the leadership of Tony Penikett from 1985 to 1992, and under the leadership of Piers McDonald from 1996 to 2000. The party's current leader is Kate White. The NDP sat as official opposition to the Yukon Party government in the Yukon Legislative Assembly until May 2006. In the 2006 Yukon election later that year, the three incumbent New Democrat Members of the Legislative Assembly were reelected, but the party failed to win any additional seats and remained in third place behind the five members of the Yukon Liberal Party and the ten member Yukon Party majority government.

In January 2009, the NDP were reduced to two seats: Todd Hardy (Whitehorse Centre) and Steve Cardiff (Mount Lorne), after the Party's third member, John Edzerza, resigned to sit as an independent. Edzerza later rejoined the Yukon Party, for which he had originally been elected in the 2002 Yukon election.

Hardy died in July 2010, reducing the NDP to a single seat. On November 12, a by-election was called for his riding of Whitehorse Centre on December 13, which was won by the Party leader Hanson. Cardiff was killed in a car crash on July 7, 2011, again reducing the party to one seat in the legislature entering the 2011 election.

In the 2011 election, the Yukon NDP under Elizabeth Hanson elected six MLAs to form the territory's Official Opposition. The NDP was the only party to see an increase in its share of the popular vote over the 2006 Yukon election. In the 2016 election, the NDP was reduced to two seats and third party status.

In May 2019, Kate White the incumbent MLA for Takhini-Kopper King was acclaimed as the new party leader, replacing Hanson. In the 2021 election, the Yukon NDP under White won three seats. On April 23, the incumbent Liberals were sworn in with a minority government. On April 28, the NDP announced that they had entered into a formal confidence and supply agreement with the Liberals. In the 2025 election, the party returned to official opposition and recorded its best popular vote since 1996.

== Leaders of the Yukon NDP ==
The following is a list of the Yukon NDP leaders since Yukon introduced political parties provincially in 1978.

	Leader	Years in Office
1	Fred Berger	1978–1981
2	Tony Penikett	1981–1995
3	Piers McDonald	1995–2000
4	Trevor Harding	2000–2001
5	Eric Fairclough	2001–2002
6	Todd Hardy	2002–2009
7	Elizabeth Hanson	2009–2019
8	Kate White	2019–present

== Election results ==
Election	Leader	Votes	%	Seats	+/−	Position	Government
1978	Fred Berger	1,568	20.3	1 / 16	▲1	▲3rd	Third party
1982	Tony Penikett	3,689	35.4	6 / 16	▲5	▲2nd	Opposition
1985	Tony Penikett	4,335	41.1	8 / 16	▲2	▲1st	Minority
1989	Tony Penikett	5,275	44.9	9 / 16	▲1	1st	Majority
1992	Tony Penikett	4,571	35.1	6 / 17	▼3	▼2nd	Opposition
1996	Piers McDonald	5,774	39.9	11 / 17	▲5	▲1st	Majority
2000	Piers McDonald	4,677	32.8	6 / 17	▼5	▼2nd	Opposition
2002	Todd Hardy	3,763	26.9	5 / 18	▼1	2nd	Opposition
2006	Todd Hardy	3,197	23.6	3 / 18	▼2	▼3rd	Third party
2011	Elizabeth Hanson	5,154	32.6	6 / 19	▲3	▲2nd	Opposition
2016	Elizabeth Hanson	4,928	26.2	2 / 19	▼4	▼3rd	Third party
2021	Kate White	5,356	28.2	3 / 19	▲1	3rd	Confidence and supply
2025	Kate White	7,107	37.8	6 / 21	▲3	▲2nd	Opposition

== See also ==
- List of articles about Yukon NDP members
- List of Yukon political parties
- List of premiers of Yukon
- List of Yukon Leaders of Opposition
