= Yukon Liberal Party =

Territorial political party in Canada

Yukon Liberal Party _{Parti libéral du Yukon}
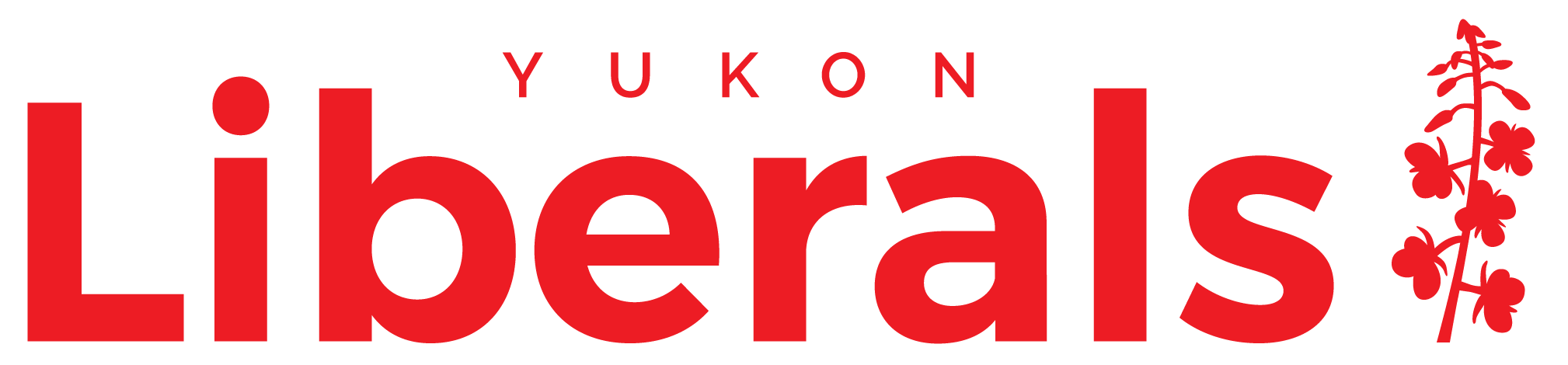
- Leader: Debra-Leigh Reti (interim)
- President: Jason Cunning
- Founded: 1978; 48 years ago
- Headquarters: 108 Elliott Street; Unit 183; Whitehorse, Yukon; Y1A 6C4
- Membership (2025): >1,000
- Ideology: Liberalism (Canadian)
- Political position: Centre
- Colours: Red
- Seats in Legislature: 1 / 21

Website
- www.ylp.ca

The Yukon Liberal Party (French: Parti libéral du Yukon) is a political party in the territory of Yukon, Canada. The party is not organizationally linked to the federal Liberal Party of Canada in any official manner.

== History ==
After twenty years as a minor party, the Yukon Liberal Party won the 2000 general election and formed a government under Premier Pat Duncan. The government, however, was reduced to minority government status. Duncan called a snap election for November 2002 in the hope of regaining her government's majority. The party was almost completely wiped out, however, by the Yukon Party. Duncan won the Liberals' sole seat in the Yukon Party's landslide.

The Liberal Party remained in opposition until the 2016 general election where the party went from third place in the legislature to majority government with its leader, Sandy Silver, becoming Premier.

Following the 2021 Yukon general election, on April 28, the NDP announced that they had entered into a formal confidence and supply agreement with the Liberals.

Only one sitting Liberal MLA sought re-election in the 2025 Yukon general election, an election where the party was almost completely wiped out.

== Electoral performances ==
=== Legislative Assembly ===
Election	Leader	Votes	%	Seats	+/–	Position	Status
1978	Iain MacKay	2,201	26.0	2 / 16	2	2nd	Opposition
1982	Ron Veale	1,564	15.0	0 / 16	▼2	▼3rd	No seats
1985	Roger Coles	806	7.6	2 / 16	▲2	3rd	Third party
1989	Jim McLachlan	1,303	11.1	0 / 16	▼2	3rd	No seats
1992	Paul Thériault	2,098	16.1	1 / 17	▲1	▼4th	Fourth party
1996	Ken Taylor	3,486	24.1	3 / 17	▲2	▲3rd	Third party
2000	Pat Duncan	6,092	42.7	10 / 17	▲7	▲1st	Majority
2002	Pat Duncan	4,056	29.0	1 / 18	▼7	▼3rd	Third party
2006	Arthur Mitchell	4,704	34.7	5 / 18	▲4	▲2nd	Opposition
2011	Arthur Mitchell	3,979	25.2	2 / 19	▼3	▼3rd	Third party
2016	Sandy Silver	7,404	39.4	11 / 19	▲10	▲1st	Majority
2021	Sandy Silver	6,132	32.4	8 / 19	▼3	1st	Minority (Note: The New Democratic Party provided confidence and supply for the Liberal Party government. Tied with the Yukon Party in seat count.)
2025	Mike Pemberton	1,914	10.2	1 / 21	▼7	▼3rd	Third party

== Leaders ==
- Iain MacKay 1978–1981
- Ron Veale 1981–1984
- Roger Coles 1984–1986
- Jim McLachlan 1986–1989
- Paul Thériault 1989–1992
- Jack Cable 1992–1995 (interim)
- Ken Taylor 1995–1997
- Jack Cable 1997–1998 (interim)
- Pat Duncan 1998–2005
- Arthur Mitchell 2005–2011
- Darius Elias 2011–2012 (interim)
- Sandy Silver 2012–2023
- Ranj Pillai 2023–2025
- Mike Pemberton 2025–2026
- Debra-Leigh Reti 2026–present (interim)

== See also ==
- List of political parties in Canada
- List of premiers of Yukon
- List of Yukon Leaders of Opposition
