= Yukon Party =

Territorial political party in Canada

Yukon Party Parti du Yukon
- Abbreviation: YP
- Leader: Currie Dixon
- President: Melanie Brais
- Founded: 1978; 48 years ago
- Headquarters: Whitehorse, YT
- Membership (2020): 1,577
- Ideology: Conservatism; Yukon regionalism
- Political position: Centre-right
- Colours: Blue
- Seats in Legislature: 14 / 21

Website
- www.yukonparty.ca

The Yukon Party (YP), formerly the Yukon Progressive Conservative Party, is a conservative political party in Yukon, Canada. It is the current governing party, with a majority in the Yukon Legislative Assembly.

== History ==
The Yukon Progressive Conservative Party was founded in April 1978. Long time Yukon legislator Hilda Watson was elected as the party's first leader defeating Yukon MP Erik Nielsen by one vote. Watson had been a member of the territorial Legislative Council since 1970, and became the first woman in Canadian history to lead a political party into a general election. However, she was unable to win a seat in the 1978 election, and consequently resigned. Chris Pearson then became the leader of the party and was able to get a position in the government.

The Progressive Conservatives were defeated in the 1985 election by the Yukon New Democratic Party (NDP) led by Tony Penikett. With the increasing unpopularity of the Prime Minister Brian Mulroney's Progressive Conservative in the federal government, the Yukon Progressive Conservatives decided to sever their relations with the federal Conservatives. Later on, they renamed themselves the "Yukon Party" prior to the 1992 election.

The party's first leadership convention as the Yukon Party was held in June 1991 and won by Chris Young, a 21-year-old former president of the Yukon Progressive Conservatives' youth chapter. However, two Progressive Conservative MLAs, Bea Firth and Alan Nordling, quit the party within days of his victory, and formed the Independent Alliance Party.

By August, however, Young resigned as leader on the grounds that he felt the voters of Yukon were not prepared to support a party whose leader was so young and politically inexperienced, and John Ostashek was acclaimed as his successor in November after his sole challenger, Daniel Lang, dropped out of the race.

The Yukon Party won the 1992 election, and Ostashek became Premier of Yukon. He won only a minority government, and Nordling, Firth and Willard Phelps were all reelected as independents, but all three opted to support the Yukon Party on confidence and supply. Ostashek's government became very unpopular by increasing taxes and cutting services. The party was defeated in the 1996 election by the NDP, winning only three seats and falling to third place for the first time behind the Yukon Liberal Party.

In the 1996 election, Nordling returned to the party; he was defeated as a Yukon Party candidate. Further, Firth retired from politics.

=== Since 2000 ===
Logo used by the party prior to its 2016 re-branding.

The party's fortunes continued to decline at the 2000 general election. The Yukon Party was reduced to a single seat in the legislature as the right wing vote moved to the Yukon Liberal Party, putting the Liberals in power for the first time in the territory's history.

Liberal Premier Pat Duncan's government was plagued with internal dissent, however, and despite having won an outright majority of seats in the general election, defections and resignations reduced the Liberals to a minority government within two years. Premier Duncan called a snap election for 4 November 2002, in an effort to regain her majority, but the early election call backfired.

The Yukon Party had elected Dennis Fentie, a rural Member of the Yukon Legislative Assembly (MLA), who had defected from the Yukon New Democratic Party (NDP), as its new leader in June 2002. Despite being caught by surprise by the election call, the party was able to win a majority government with 12 seats compared to five for the NDP. The Liberals were reduced to a single seat. Fentie became the second Yukon Premier from a rural riding.

On 10 October 2006, the Yukon Party was re-elected, holding 10 seats in the Legislative Assembly. The Yukon Liberals won five seats and the Yukon New Democrats won three.

The party was defeated in the 2016 Yukon general election and served as the Official Opposition.

Currie Dixon led the party into the 2021 territorial election, the Yukon Party won 8 seats and won the popular vote overall. Dixon was personally elected in the district of Copperbelt North. On April 23, the incumbent Liberals were sworn in with a minority government. On April 28, the NDP announced that they had entered into a formal confidence and supply agreement with the Liberals. He led the party into the 2025 general election, where the party formed a majority government and received over 50 percent of the popular vote for the first time.

== Electoral performances ==
Election	Leader	Votes	%	Seats	+/–	Position	Status
1978	Hilda Watson	2,869	37.1	11 / 16	▲11	▲1st	Majority
1982	Chris Pearson	4,770	46.9	10 / 16	▼1	1st	Majority
1985	Willard Phelps	4,335	46.9	6 / 16	▼4	▼2nd	Opposition
1989	Willard Phelps	5,275	46.9	7 / 16	▲1	2nd	Opposition
Changed name from Yukon Progressive Conservative Party to Yukon Party in 1991
1992	John Ostashek	4,675	35.9	7 / 17	▲7	▲1st	Minority
1996	John Ostashek	4,366	30.1	3 / 17	▼4	▼2nd	Opposition
2000	John Ostashek	3,466	23.3	1 / 17	▼2	▼3rd	Third party
2002	Dennis Fentie	5,650	40.3	12 / 18	▲11	▲1st	Majority
2006	Dennis Fentie	5,503	40.6	10 / 18	▼2	1st	Majority
2011	Darrell Pasloski	6,400	40.6	11 / 19	▲1	1st	Majority
2016	Darrell Pasloski	6,272	33.4	6 / 19	▼5	▼2nd	Opposition
2021	Currie Dixon	7,477	39.3	8 / 19	▲2	▲1st	Opposition
2025	Currie Dixon	9,761	51.9	14 / 21	▲6	1st	Majority

== Leaders ==
- Hilda Watson – 1978
- Chris Pearson – 1978–1979 (interim), 1978–1985
- Willard Phelps – 1985–1991
- Chris Young – 1991
- John Ostashek – 1991–2000
- Peter Jenkins – 2000–2002 (interim)
- Dennis Fentie – 2002–2011
- Darrell Pasloski – 2011–2016
- Stacey Hassard - 2016–2020 (interim)
- Currie Dixon – 2020–present

== See also ==
- List of premiers of Yukon
- List of Yukon Leaders of Opposition
