= 31st Legislature of Yukon =

Legislature of Yukon, Canada, 2002–2006

The 31st Yukon Legislative Assembly convened in 2002, after the victory of the Yukon Party led by Dennis Fentie in the 2002 Yukon general election. The Yukon Party formed the territorial government, Dennis Fentie became the premier, and Ted Staffen became the speaker.

== Membership in the 31st Assembly ==
The following members were elected to the 31st Yukon Legislative Assembly in the general election of November 4, 2002:

Member	Party	Electoral district	First elected / previously elected	No. of terms
Haakon Arntzen	Yukon Party	Copperbelt	2002	1st term
Haakon Arntzen	Independent	Copperbelt	2002	1st term
Arthur Mitchell (2005)	Liberal	Copperbelt	2005	1st term
Peter Jenkins	Yukon Party	Klondike	1996	3rd term
Peter Jenkins	Independent	Klondike	1996	3rd term
Gary McRobb	NDP	Kluane	1996	3rd term
Gary McRobb	Independent	Kluane	1996	3rd term
Gary McRobb	Liberal	Kluane	1996	3rd term
Brad Cathers	Yukon Party	Lake Laberge	2002	1st term
Eric Fairclough	NDP	Mayo-Tatchun	1996	3rd term
Eric Fairclough	Independent	Mayo-Tatchun	1996	3rd term
Eric Fairclough	Liberal	Mayo-Tatchun	1996	3rd term
John Edzerza	Yukon Party	McIntyre-Takhini	2002	1st term
Steve Cardiff	NDP	Mount Lorne	2002	1st term
Dean Hassard	Yukon Party	Pelly-Nisutlin	2002	1st term
Archie Lang	Yukon Party	Porter Creek Centre	2002	1st term
Jim Kenyon	Yukon Party	Porter Creek North	2002	1st term
Pat Duncan	Liberal	Porter Creek South	1996	3rd term
Ted Staffen	Yukon Party	Riverdale North	2002	1st term
Glenn Hart	Yukon Party	Riverdale South	2002	1st term
Patrick Rouble	Yukon Party	Southern Lakes	2002	1st term
Lorraine Peter	NDP	Vuntut Gwitchin	2000	2nd term
Dennis Fentie	Yukon Party	Watson Lake	1996 (Note: First elected as a New Democrat)	3rd term
Todd Hardy	NDP	Whitehorse Centre	1996, 2002	2nd term*
Elaine Taylor	Yukon Party	Whitehorse West	2002	1st term

== Standings changes after the 2002 general election ==
Number of members per party by date	2002	2004	2005	2005
Number of members per party by date	Nov 4	Apr 28	Nov 21	Nov 28
Yukon Party	12	11	11	10
NDP	5	5	5	5
Liberal Party	1	1	2	2
Independent	0	1	0	1
Total members	18			
Vacant	0			
Government Majority	6	4	2	2

=== Membership changes ===
Membership changes in the 33rd Assembly
Date	Name	District	Party	Reason
April 28, 2004	Haakon Arntzen	Copperbelt	Independent	Left the Yukon Party caucus to sit as an Independent.
November 21, 2005	Arthur Mitchell	Copperbelt	Liberal Party	Arthur Mitchell succeeded Haakon Arntzen in the Copperbelt By-Election.
November 28, 2005	Peter Jenkins	Klondike	Independent	Peter Jenkins left the Yukon Party caucus and cabinet due to outstanding loans to the territorial government.

== By-elections ==
A by-election was held in the district of Copperbelt in 2005:

Electoral district	Member elected	Affiliation	Election date	Reason
Copperbelt	Arthur Mitchell	Liberal Party	November 21, 2005	Haakon Arntzen was convicted for indecent assault and resigned on September 9, 2005
