= 32nd Legislature of Yukon =

Legislature of Yukon, Canada, 2006–2011

The 32nd Yukon Legislative Assembly began on October 10, 2006. The Yukon Party Government led by Dennis Fentie was sustained holding a small majority of seats.

== Membership in the 32nd Assembly ==
Member	Party	Electoral district	First elected / previously elected	No. of terms
Arthur Mitchell	Liberal	Copperbelt	2005	2nd term
Steve Nordick	Yukon Party	Klondike	2006	1st term
Gary McRobb	Liberal	Kluane	1996 (Note: First elected as a New Democrat)	4th term
Brad Cathers	Yukon Party	Lake Laberge	2002	2nd term
Brad Cathers	Independent	Lake Laberge	2002	2nd term
Brad Cathers	Yukon Party	Lake Laberge	2002	2nd term
Eric Fairclough	Liberal	Mayo-Tatchun	1996	4th term
John Edzerza	NDP	McIntyre-Takhini	2002 (Note: First elected as a Yukon Party)	2nd term
John Edzerza	Independent	McIntyre-Takhini	2002	2nd term
John Edzerza	Yukon Party	McIntyre-Takhini	2002	2nd term
Steve Cardiff	NDP	Mount Lorne	2002	2nd term
Marian Horne	Yukon Party	Pelly-Nisutlin	2006	1st term
Archie Lang	Yukon Party	Porter Creek Centre	2002	2nd term
Jim Kenyon	Yukon Party	Porter Creek North	2002	2nd term
Don Inverarity	Liberal	Porter Creek South	2006	1st term
Ted Staffen	Yukon Party	Riverdale North	2002	2nd term
Glenn Hart	Yukon Party	Riverdale South	2002	2nd term
Patrick Rouble	Yukon Party	Southern Lakes	2002	2nd term
Darius Elias	Liberal	Vuntut Gwitchin	2006	1st term
Dennis Fentie	Yukon Party	Watson Lake	1996	4th term
Todd Hardy	NDP	Whitehorse Centre	1996, 2002	3rd term*
Elizabeth Hanson (2010)	NDP	Whitehorse Centre	2010	1st term
Elaine Taylor	Yukon Party	Whitehorse West	2002	2nd term

== Standings changes since the 2006 general election ==
Number of members per party by date	2006	2009			2010		2011	
Number of members per party by date	Oct 10	Jan 27	Aug 28	Oct 22	Jul 28	Dec 13	Jun 29	Jul 6
Yukon Party	10		9	10			11	
Liberal	5							
NDP	3	2			1	2		1
Independent	0	1	2	1			0	
Total members	18				17	18	18	17
Vacant	0				1	0		1
Government Majority	2		0	2	3	2	4	5

=== Membership changes ===
Membership changes in the 32nd Assembly
Date	Name	District	Party	Reason
October 10, 2006	See List of Members			Election day of the 36th Yukon general election
January 27, 2009	John Edzerza	McIntyre-Takhini	Independent	Left Yukon New Democratic Party caucus
August 28, 2009	Brad Cathers	Lake Laberge	Independent	Left Yukon Party caucus
October 22, 2009	John Edzerza	McIntyre-Takhini	Yukon Party	Joined the Yukon Party caucus.
July 28, 2010	Todd Hardy	Whitehorse Centre	NDP	Died from cancer
December 13, 2010	Elizabeth Hanson	Whitehorse Centre	NDP	Elected in a by-election
June 29, 2011	Brad Cathers	Lake Laberge	Yukon Party	Re-joined the Yukon Party caucus
July 6, 2011	Steve Cardiff	Mount Lorne	NDP	Died in a car accident
