= 2011 Yukon general election =

Canadian territorial election

← 2006	October 11, 2011	2016 →

All 19 seats to the Legislative Assembly 10 seats needed for a majority
- Opinion polls
- Turnout: 74.34% (▲1.44pp)
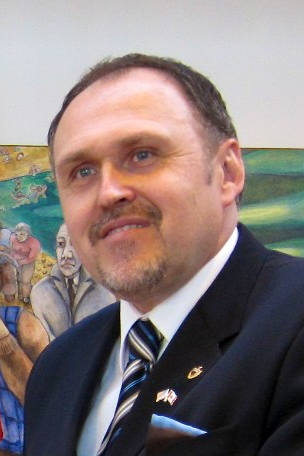

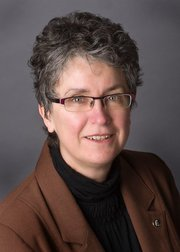
	Majority party	Minority party	Third party
			LIB
Leader	Darrell Pasloski	Elizabeth Hanson	Arthur Mitchell
Party	Yukon Party	New Democratic	Liberal
Leader since	May 28, 2011	September 26, 2009	June 2005
Leader's seat	Mountainview	Whitehorse Centre	Ran in Copperbelt North (Note: Mitchell represented Copperbelt in the 32nd Assembly, but he unsuccessfully ran in Copperbelt North, one of four ridings Copperbelt was divided into at the last redistribution.) (Lost)
Last election	10 seats, 40.6%	3 seats, 23.6%	5 seats, 34.7%
Seats before	11	1	5
Seats won	11	6	2
Seat change	0	▲5	▼3
Popular vote	6,400	5,154	3,979
Percentage	40.44%	32.57%	25.33%
Swing	▼0.1%	▲9.0%	▼9.5%
- Popular vote by riding. As this is a First-Past-The-Post election, seat totals are not determined by popular vote, but instead via results by each riding. Riding names are listed at the bottom of the map.
Premier before election
Darrell Pasloski
Yukon Party
Premier after election
Darrell Pasloski
Yukon Party

The 2011 general election in Yukon, Canada, took place on October 11, 2011, to return members to the 33rd Yukon Legislative Assembly.

The incumbent government was led by Darrell Pasloski, who was elected as leader of the Yukon Party at a convention on May 28, 2011, replacing former Premier Dennis Fentie. The Yukon Party won its third majority government, with Elizabeth Hanson's NDP becoming the Official Opposition, replacing the Liberal Party, whose leader Arthur Mitchell was unable to return to the Assembly.

== Pre-writ period ==
=== Redistribution ===
In 2008, the Yukon Assembly struck a committee to review the electoral district boundaries for this election. The committee decided to increase the number of seats in the territory to 19. Yukon now matches the other territorial assemblies in the Northwest Territories and Nunavut in terms of the number of seats.

The rural districts outside of the capital city of Whitehorse remained unchanged with the exception of Mount Lorne and Southern Lakes which were merged into a single district. The total number of rural districts dropped from 9 to 8.

The urban ridings in Whitehorse were increased to 11 from 9. Only three districts in Whitehorse had no boundary changes, Whitehorse Centre, Riverdale North and Riverdale South. The riding that received the most significant alteration was Copperbelt. That district was split into four ridings, primarily Copperbelt North and Copperbelt South, while McIntyre-Takhini was significantly expanded in western uninhabited part of Copperbelt and renamed Takhini-Kopper King. An entirely new riding was also created out of Copperbelt called Mountainview. The remaining urban districts all received minor boundary adjustments.

The boundary changes were adopted by the Yukon Legislative Assembly in 2009.

=== Lake Laberge dispute ===
In the fall of 2009, Yukon Party MLA Brad Cathers had a falling out with Premier Dennis Fentie, and ended up sitting as an independent on the opposition side.

Cathers remained a party member despite his public criticism of Fentie. On May 19, 2010, the Yukon Party riding executive of Lake Laberge nominated Brad Cathers as a delegate to the party's 2010 convention. The meeting lasted three hours and saw the riding executive loyal to Fentie, including the President, walk out on the 60 members who attended. Former MLA Al Falle defended Cathers at the meeting. The meeting ended with a board of directors loyal to Cathers being elected.

== Results ==
Official results.

Summary of Results
Party	Votes	%	Seats			
Party	Votes	%	2006	Dissolution	Elected	Change
Yukon Party	6,400	40.44	10	11	11	+1
New Democratic	5,154	32.57	3	1	6	+3
Liberal	4,008	25.33	5	5	2	-3
Green	104	0.66	New	New	0	New
First Nations Party	81	0.51	New	New	0	New
Independents	79	0.50	0	0	0	±0
Vacant			–	1	–	–
Total	15,826	100.00	18	18	19	+1

Popular vote
Yukon Party	40.44%
New Democratic	32.57%
Liberal	25.33%
Green	0.56%
Others	1.10%

Seats summary
Yukon Party	57.89%
New Democratic	31.58%
Liberal	10.53%

== Candidates running ==
Bold incumbents indicates cabinet members and party leaders and the speaker of the assembly are italicized.

=== Rural Yukon ===
Electoral district	Candidates				Incumbent
Electoral district	Yukon	NDP	Liberal	Other	Incumbent
Klondike	Steve Nordick; 404 (37.4%)	Jorn Meier; 147 (13.6%)	Sandy Silver; 530 (49.0%)		Steve Nordick
Kluane	Wade Istchenko; 287 (37.9%)	Eric Stinson; 220 (29.0%)	Timothy Cant; 219 (28.9%)	Gerald Dickson (FNP); 32 (4.2%)	Gary McRobb†
Lake Laberge	Brad Cathers; 528 (51.9%)	Frank Turner; 330 (32.4%)	Mike Simon; 159 (15.6%)		Brad Cathers
Mayo-Tatchun	Elaine Wyatt; 214 (31.6%)	Jim Tredger; 282 (41.7%)	Eric Fairclough; 181 (26.7%)		Eric Fairclough
Mount Lorne-Southern Lakes	Deborah Fulmer; 395 (37.9%)	Kevin Barr; 488 (46.8%)	Ted Adel; 111 (10.6%)	Stanley James (FNP); 49 (4.7%)	Vacant; Mount Lorne
Mount Lorne-Southern Lakes	Deborah Fulmer; 395 (37.9%)	Kevin Barr; 488 (46.8%)	Ted Adel; 111 (10.6%)	Stanley James (FNP); 49 (4.7%)	Merged district
Mount Lorne-Southern Lakes	Deborah Fulmer; 395 (37.9%)	Kevin Barr; 488 (46.8%)	Ted Adel; 111 (10.6%)	Stanley James (FNP); 49 (4.7%)	Patrick Rouble†; Southern Lakes
Pelly-Nisutlin	Stacey Hassard; 275 (49.4%)	Carol Geddes; 178 (32.0%)	Carl Sidney; 73 (13.1%)	Elvis Presley (Ind.); 31 (5.6%)	Marian Horne
Vuntut Gwitchin	Garry Njootli; 52 (35.9%)		Darius Elias; 93 (64.1%)		Darius Elias
Watson Lake	Patti McLeod; 276 (37.8%)	Liard McMillan; 242 (33.1%)	Thomas Slager; 165 (22.6%)	Patricia Gilhooly (Ind.); 48 (6.6%)	Dennis Fentie†

=== Whitehorse ===
Electoral district	Candidates				Incumbent
Electoral district	Yukon	NDP	Liberal	Other	Incumbent
Copperbelt North	Currie Dixon; 520 (47.9%)	Skeeter Miller-Wright; 159 (14.6%)	Arthur Mitchell; 407 (37.5%)		Split district
Copperbelt North	Currie Dixon; 520 (47.9%)	Skeeter Miller-Wright; 159 (14.6%)	Arthur Mitchell; 407 (37.5%)		Arthur Mitchell; Copperbelt
Copperbelt South	Valerie Boxall; 394 (40.4%)	Lois Moorcroft; 397 (40.7%)	Colleen Wirth; 184 (18.9%)		Arthur Mitchell; Copperbelt
Copperbelt South	Valerie Boxall; 394 (40.4%)	Lois Moorcroft; 397 (40.7%)	Colleen Wirth; 184 (18.9%)		Split district
Mountainview	Darrell Pasloski; 480 (44.8%)	Stephen Dunbar-Edge; 376 (35.1%)	Dave Sloan; 216 (20.1%)		New district
Porter Creek Centre	David Laxton; 298 (38.6%)	Jean-François Des Lauriers; 230 (29.8%)	Kerry Huff; 245 (31.7%)		Archie Lang†
Porter Creek North	Doug Graham; 400 (49.8%)	Mike Tribes; 253 (31.5%)	Dawn Beauchemin; 82 (10.2%)	Mike Ivens (Green); 69 (8.6%)	Jim Kenyon†
Porter Creek South	Mike Nixon; 257 (42.9%)	John Carney; 99 (16.5%)	Don Inverarity; 243 (40.6%)		Don Inverarity
Riverdale North	Scott Kent; 366 (37.1%)	Peter Lesniak; 296 (30.0%)	Christie Richardson; 289 (29.3%)	Kristina Calhoun (Green); 35 (3.5%)	Ted Staffen†
Riverdale South	Glenn Hart; 314 (32.4%)	Jan Stick; 380 (39.3%)	Dan Curtis; 274 (28.3%)		Glenn Hart
Takhini-Kopper King	Samson Hartland; 316 (31.7%)	Kate White; 458 (45.9%)	Cherish Clarke; 224 (22.4%)		John Edzerza†; McIntyre-Takhini
Whitehorse Centre	Marian Horne; 202 (24.3%)	Elizabeth (Liz) Hanson; 525 (63.2%)	Patrick Singh; 104 (12.5%)		Elizabeth (Liz) Hanson
Whitehorse West	Elaine Taylor; 422 (58.2%)	Louis R. Gagnon; 94 (13.0%)	Cully Robinson; 209 (28.8%)		Elaine Taylor

== Timeline ==
- October 10, 2006, the Yukon Party, under Dennis Fentie, wins its second majority government in the 36th Yukon general election.
- January 2009, John Edzerza resigns from the YNDP to sit again as an independent.
- August 28, 2009, Brad Cathers, MLA for Lake Laberge resigns from cabinet and the government caucus to sit as an independent member over issues with Premier Dennis Fentie.
- September 26, 2009, the NDP chooses Elizabeth Hanson as party leader.
- October 22, 2009, John Edzerza joins the Yukon Party (which he had previously been a member of until 2006) and now serves as Minister of the Environment.
- July 28, 2010, Todd Hardy, MLA for Whitehorse Centre and former leader of the Yukon New Democratic Party dies after a long battle with leukemia at age 53.
- September 17, 2010, the United Citizens Party of Yukon is registered.
- December 13, 2010, in a by-election, Elizabeth Hanson is elected MLA of Whitehorse Centre with 51% of the vote.
- February 28, 2011, the Yukon Green Party is registered.
- April/May 2011, United Citizens Party leader Willard Phelps resigns.
- May 28, 2011, the Yukon Party chooses Darrell Pasloski as party leader and Premier at a convention in Whitehorse.
- June 12, 2011, Darrell Pasloski is sworn in as Premier.
- June 29, 2011, Brad Cathers rejoins the Yukon Party.
- July 6, 2011, Steve Cardiff MLA for Mount Lorne dies in a car accident.
- August 2011, Kristina Calhoun is appointed leader of the Yukon Green Party.
- September 6, 2011, the Yukon First Nations Party is registered, Gerald Dickson is the leader.
- September 9, 2011, issue of the writs.
- September 19, 2011, 62 candidates are successfully nominated, none from the United Citizens Party, causing it to be deregistered.
- October 2 & 3, 2011, advance polling.
- October 5, 2011, CBC North hosts a leader's debate with Hanson, Mitchell, and Pasloski.
- October 11, 2011, polling day.
- October 17, 2011, return of the writs. Elections Yukon also announces the results of a recount in Copperbelt South, confirming Lois Moorcroft's three-vote margin of victory over Valerie Boxall.

=== Retiring MLAs ===
Member	District	Party	Reason
John Edzerza	McIntyre-Takhini	Yukon Party	Serious health issues
Dennis Fentie	Watson Lake	Yukon Party	Retire as Premier and from politics and will live full-time in Watson Lake
Jim Kenyon	Porter Creek North	Yukon Party	Defeated in party nomination.
Archie Lang	Porter Creek Centre	Yukon Party	Retired for undisclosed reasons.
Gary McRobb	Kluane	Liberal	He'd been working too long as an MLA.
Patrick Rouble	Southern Lakes	Yukon Party	Attending the University of Calgary to attain a doctorate degree.
Ted Staffen	Riverdale North	Yukon Party	Interested in returning to business in the private sector

== Opinion polls ==
Polling Firm	Date of Polling	Link	Yukon Party	New Democratic	Liberal	Green
DataPath Systems	October 2–6, 2011		35	35	26	2
DataPath Systems	July 17–25, 2011		40	35	15	7
DataPath Systems	July 2010		22	26	39	
