= Richard Mostyn =

Canadian politician

The Honourable Richard Mostyn
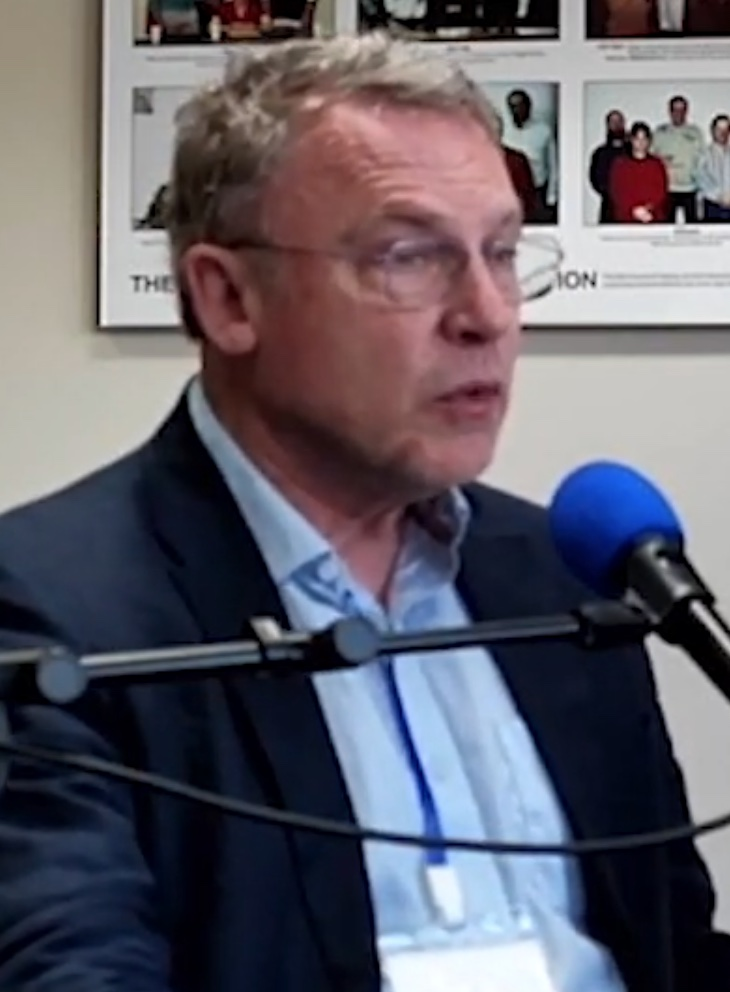

Minister of Highways and Public Works
- In office December 3, 2016 – January 14, 2023
- Premier: Sandy Silver
- Preceded by: Scott Kent; Currie Dixon
- Succeeded by: Nils Clarke

Member of the Yukon Legislative Assembly for Whitehorse West
- In office November 7, 2016 – October 3, 2025
- Preceded by: Elaine Taylor
- Succeeded by: Laura Lang

Personal details
- Party: Yukon Liberal Party

Richard Mostyn is a Canadian politician, who was elected to the Legislative Assembly of Yukon in the 2016 election. He represented the electoral district of Whitehorse West as a member of the Yukon Liberal Party until 2025. He served as the Minister of Highways and Public Works and the Public Service Commission.

== Political career ==
Mostyn was elected on November 7, 2016, defeating high profile, three-term incumbent and Yukon Party Deputy Premier Elaine Taylor by just 22 votes. Taylor, at the time, was the longest-serving Cabinet minister in the Yukon and in Canada. Mostyn was elected as part of the incoming Yukon Liberal majority government of Sandy Silver.

On December 3, 2016, Mostyn was sworn into Cabinet as the Minister of Highways and Public Works and the Minister of the Public Service Commission. Mostyn is also currently a member of the Standing Committee on Rules, Elections and Privileges. He did not run in the 2025 Yukon general election.

== Personal life ==
He arrived in Yukon with his wife in 1989.

Prior to entering politics, Mostyn was a journalist and editor of the Yukon News. Throughout his career, he covered small business, politics, health, energy, technology, mining, the environment, and the arts. His career as a journalist spanned the administrations of Yukon Premiers Tony Penikett, John Ostashek, Piers McDonald, Pat Duncan, Dennis Fentie and Darrell Pasloski.

In the course of his career, he was published in The Globe and Mail, National Post, Vancouver Sun, and Up Here Magazine, and appeared on CBC Radio and TV and the BBC World Service.

After leaving journalism in 2011, Mostyn worked for the Canadian Parks and Wilderness Society and its campaign to champion the Peel Watershed land-use plan. In 2012, he joined the Yukon Workers’ Compensation Health and Safety Board before running for territorial politics.

== Electoral record ==
2021 Yukon general election: Whitehorse West
Party	Candidate	Votes	%	±%
Liberal	Richard Mostyn	398	39.68	-6.1%
Yukon Party	Angela Drainville	376	37.48	-6.1%
New Democratic	Ron Davis	229	22.83	+12.1%
Total valid votes		1,003		
Total rejected ballots				
Turnout				
Eligible voters				
Liberal hold		Swing		-7.33
Source(s) "Unofficial Election Results 2021". Elections Yukon.

=== 2016 general election ===
Whitehorse West
Party	Candidate	Votes	%	±%
Liberal	Richard Mostyn	455	45.8%	+17.1%
Yukon Party	Elaine Taylor	433	43.6%	-14.3%
NDP	Stu Clark	106	10.7%	-2.2%
Total		994	100.0%	–
