= 2002 Yukon general election =

Canadian territorial election

← 2000	November 4, 2002	2006 →

18 seats of the Yukon Legislative Assembly 10 seats needed for a majority
- Turnout: 78.13% (▼0.45pp)
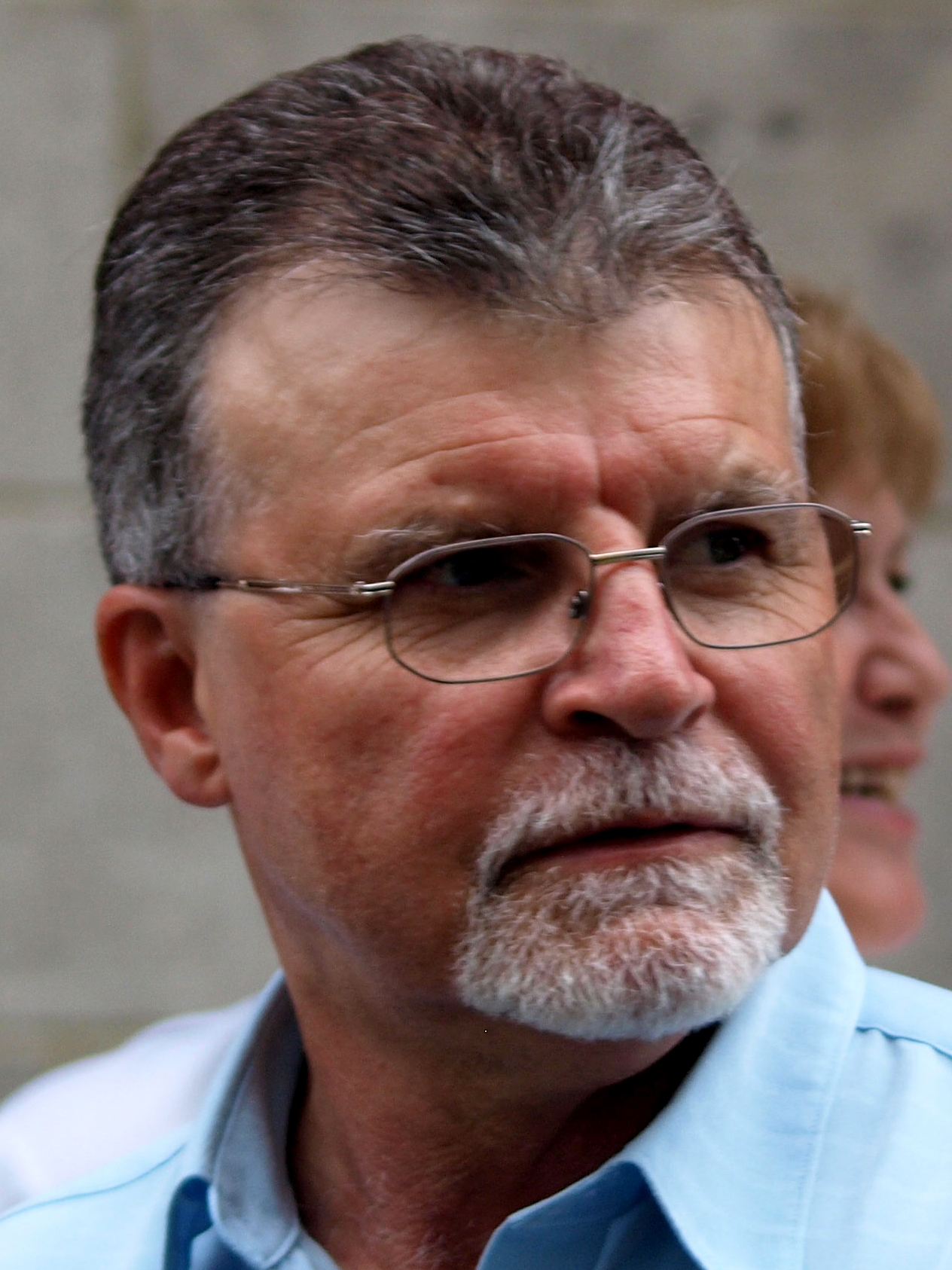

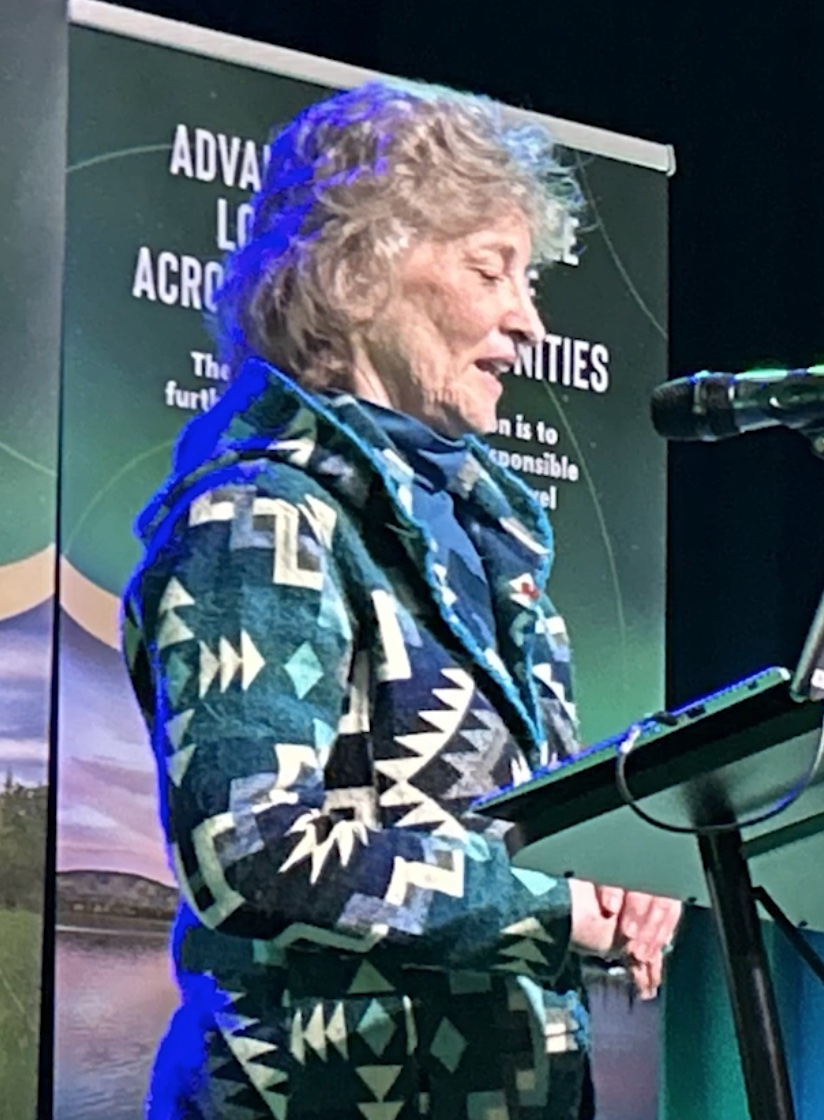
	First party	Second party	Third party
		NDP
Leader	Dennis Fentie	Todd Hardy	Pat Duncan
Party	Yukon Party	New Democratic	Liberal
Leader since	2002	2002	1998
Leader's seat	Watson Lake	Whitehorse Centre	Porter Creek South
Last election	1	6	10
Seats won	12	5	1
Seat change	▲11	▼1	▼9
Popular vote	5,650	3,763	4,056
Percentage	40.3%	26.9%	29.0%
Swing	▲17.0pp	▼5.9pp	▼13.7pp
- Popular vote by riding. As this is an FPTP election, seat totals are not determined by popular vote, but instead via results by each riding. Click the map for more details.
Premier before election
Pat Duncan
Liberal
Premier after election
Dennis Fentie
Yukon Party

The 2002 Yukon general election was held on November 4, 2002, to elect members of the 31st Yukon Legislative Assembly in Yukon, Canada.

== Results by party ==
The Yukon Legislature after the 2002 election.

Party	Party leader	# of candidates	Seats			Popular vote	
Party	Party leader	# of candidates	Before	After	% Change	#	%
Yukon Party	Dennis Fentie	18	2	12	+500%	5650	40.3%
New Democratic	Todd Hardy	18	4	5	+25%	3763	26.9%
Liberal	Pat Duncan	18	8	1	-87.5%	4056	29.0%
Independents		6	3	0	-100%	535	3.8%
Total		60	17	18	+5.6	14004	100.0

Party	Seats	Second	Third	Fourth	Fifth
Yukon Party	12	4	1	1	0
New Democratic	5	2	11	0	0
Liberal	1	12	5	0	0
Independents	0	0	1	4	1

== Results by riding ==
names in bold indicate party leaders

Electoral district	Candidates				Incumbent
Electoral district	Yukon	Liberal	NDP	Other	Incumbent
Copperbelt	Haakon Arntzen; 374	Arthur Mitchell; 312	Lillian Grubach-Hambrook; 263		New district
Klondike	Peter Jenkins; 508	Glen Everitt; 224	Lisa Hutton; 200		Peter Jenkins
Kluane	Michael Crawshay; 124	Paul Birckel; 109	Gary McRobb; 442		Gary McRobb
Lake Laberge	Brad Cathers; 466	Pam Buckway; 218	Bill Commins; 150		Pam Buckway
McIntyre-Takhini	John Edzerza; 288	Judy Gingell; 204	Maureen Stephens; 270	Wayne Jim; 129 Geoffrey Capp; 15	Wayne Jim
Mayo-Tatchun	Jerry C. Kruse; 102	Pat Van Bibber; 210	Eric Fairclough; 339	Dibs Williams; 36	Eric Fairclough
Mount Lorne	Darcy Tkachuk; 271	Cynthia Tucker; 236	Steve Cardiff; 334		Cynthia Tucker
Pelly-Nisutlin	Dean Hassard; 297	Jim McLachlan; 181	Buzz Burgess; 162		Jim McLachlan
Porter Creek Centre	Archie Lang; 399	Scott Kent; 312	Judi Johnny; 63		Scott Kent
Porter Creek North	Jim Kenyon; 331	Dave Austin; 148	Mark Bowers; 135	Roger Rondeau; 112	Don Roberts
Porter Creek South	Lynn Ogden; 301	**Pat Duncan**; 408	Paul Warner; 80		**Pat Duncan**
Riverdale North	Ted Staffen; 446	Dale Eftoda; 355	Jan Slipetz; 223		Dale Eftoda
Riverdale South	Glenn Hart; 385	Sue Edelman; 332	Cary Gryba; 253		Sue Edelman
Southern Lakes	Patrick Rouble; 227	Manfred Janssen; 106	Rachael Lewis; 190	Warren Braunberger; 41	Dave Keenan
Vuntut Gwitchin	Randall Tetlichi; 41	Joe Tetlichi; 34	Lorraine Peter; 68		Lorraine Peter
Watson Lake	**Dennis Fentie**; 521	Tom Cove; 130	Kathy Magun; 174		**Dennis Fentie**
Whitehorse Centre	Vicki Durrant; 171	Bernie Phillips; 218	**Todd Hardy**; 300	Mike McLarnon; 207	Mike McLarnon
Whitehorse West	Elaine Taylor; 398	Dennis Schneider; 319	Rachel Grantham; 117		Dennis Schneider

== Electoral boundary changes from last election ==
- The riding of Faro was represented by Trevor Harding (NDP). Jim McLachlan (Liberal) was elected in a by-election after Harding resigned. The riding disappeared, absorbed into Pelly-Nisutlin.
- The riding of Ross River-Southern Lakes represented by Dave Keenan (NDP) was split, with Ross River and Teslin going in Pelly-Nisutlin, the rest (Carcross and Marsh Lake) became Southern Lakes along with the portions of the Mount Lorne riding.
- The Whitehorse riding of Riverside, (represented by Scott Kent (Lib) who moved to Porter Creek Centre), disappeared absorbed into Whitehorse Centre and Riverdale North.
- The Whitehorse riding of Copperbelt is a new riding created by splitting Whitehorse West.
- The Whitehorse riding of Porter Creek Centre is a new riding created by splitting Porter Creek North.

== Member changes from last election ==
- James R. McLachlan (Liberal) elected in a by-election in the riding of Faro after the resignation of Trevor Harding in 2000.
- Dennis Fentie (NDP) defects to the Yukon Party in May 2002 and became leader one month later.
- Mike McLarnon (Liberal) defects and becomes an Independent in May 2002.
- Wayne Jim (Liberal) defects and becomes an Independent in May 2002.
- Don Roberts (Liberal) defects and becomes an Independent in May 2002.
