= List of political parties in Yukon =

The following is a list of political parties in Yukon, Canada. Between 1902 and 1978, candidates in elections for the Yukon Territorial Council all ran as independents. Party politics was established in the territory for the 1978 territorial election in preparation for the 1979 introduction of responsible government and the devolution of many responsibilities from the federal government to the new Yukon Legislative Assembly.

Yukon is the only one of the three Canadian territories which has political parties operating on a territorial level. Both Nunavut and the Northwest Territories operate their legislatures on a non-partisan consensus government model.

== Parties represented in the Legislative Assembly ==
Name	Founded	Ideology	Membership	Leader	MLAs
Yukon Party; Parti du Yukon	1991	Conservatism	1,577 (2020)	Currie Dixon	14 / 21
Yukon New Democratic Party; Nouveau Parti démocratique du Yukon	1978	Social democracy	503 (2017)	Kate White	6 / 21
Yukon Liberal Party; Parti libéral du Yukon	1978	Liberalism	>1,000 (2025)	Debra-Leigh Reti (interim)	1 / 21

== Defunct parties ==
Name	Period	Ideology	Notes
Independent Alliance Party; Alliance de l'indépendant	1991–1999	Conservatism	Breakaway from the Yukon Party.
United Citizens Party of Yukon; Parti des citoyens unis du Yukon	2010–2011	Conservatism	Created by former Progressive Conservative Premier Willard Phelps, deregistered after failing to yield candidates.
Yukon First Nations Party; Parti des Premières Nations du Yukon	2011–2016	First Nations traditional laws	Led by Gerald Dickson Sr., a Kluane First Nation member.
Yukon Progressive Conservative Party; Parti progressiste-conservateur du Yukon	1978–1991	Conservatism	Succeeded by the Yukon Party.
Yukon Green Party; Parti vert du Yukon	2011–2021	Green politics	Deregistered after failing to field candidates in the 2021 Yukon general election.
Socialist Party of the Yukon Territory; Parti socialiste du Territoire du Yukon	1904–1925	Socialism	The party later became a branch of the Socialist Party of Canada. It did not run candidates.
Yukon Freedom Party	2021–2025	Right-wing populism	Created by former People's Party of Canada candidate Joseph Zelezny.
