= Laura Lang (politician) =

Canadian politician

The Honourable Laura Lang MLA

Minister of Justice and Minister responsible for the French Language Services Directorate, the Women and Gender Equity Directorate, and the Worker's Safety and Compensation Board
- Incumbent
- Assumed office November 22, 2025
- Premier: Currie Dixon
- Preceded by: Tracy-Anne McPhee (Justice); John Streicker (French Language Services Directorate); Jeanie McLean (Women and Gender Equity Directorate); Richard Mostyn (Worker's Safety and Compensation Board)

Member of the Yukon Legislative Assembly for Whitehorse West
- Incumbent
- Assumed office November 3, 2025
- Preceded by: Richard Mostyn

Personal details
- Party: Yukon Party

Laura Lang is a Canadian politician, who was elected to the Yukon Legislative Assembly in the 2025 Yukon general election. She represents the electoral district of Whitehorse West as a member of the Yukon Party.

Prior to her election to the legislature, she was a senior director of the Yukon Housing Corporation. She is the daughter-in-law of retired Yukon MLA and senator Daniel Lang.

== Electoral record ==
2025 Yukon general election: Whitehorse West
Party	Candidate	Votes	%	±%
Yukon Party	Laura Lang	615	55.06	+17.58
New Democratic	Katherine McCallum	363	32.50	+9.67
Liberal	Mike Pemberton	139	12.44	-27.24
Total valid votes		1,117		
Total rejected ballots				
Turnout			52.54	
Eligible voters		2,126		
Yukon Party gain from Liberal		Swing		+22.41
Source(s) "2025 General Election Official Results". Elections Yukon.
