= Fentie =

Fentie may refer to:

== Surname ==
- Dennis Fentie (1950-2019), Canadian politician in Yukon
- Kalkidan Fentie (born 1998), Ethiopian athlete
