= Jim Kenyon =

Canadian politician

MLA for Porter Creek North
- In office November 4, 2002 – October 11, 2011
- Preceded by: Don Roberts
- Succeeded by: Doug Graham

Minister of Economic Development
- In office July 12, 2004 – May 4, 2011
- Premier: Dennis Fentie
- Preceded by: Office established
- Succeeded by: Steve Nordick

Minister of the Environment
- In office November 30, 2002 – July 12, 2004
- Premier: Dennis Fentie
- Preceded by: Dale Eftoda
- Succeeded by: Peter Jenkins

Personal details
- Party: Yukon Party; Canadian Alliance
- Occupation: Veterinarian

Jim Kenyon is a Canadian politician, who represented the electoral district of Porter Creek North in the Yukon Legislative Assembly from 2002 to 2011. He is a member of the Yukon Party.

Kenyon was a candidate for the leadership of the Yukon Party in 2011, following the resignation of Dennis Fentie, but lost to Darrell Pasloski.

== Political career ==
Jim Kenyon, a former veterinary surgeon, first attempted to enter electoral politics in the 2000 Canadian federal election in the riding of Yukon as a member of the newly formed Canadian Alliance Party. Kenyon was unsuccessful in his attempt to unseat incumbent New Democrat Louise Hardy, though Hardy did lose to Liberal candidate Larry Bagnell.

=== 31st Legislative Assembly ===
Kenyon ran again, this time at the territorial level, in the 2002 Yukon election on behalf of the Yukon Party in the Whitehorse riding of Porter Creek North. Though long-held by the Yukon Party, Porter Creek North had been lost to the Yukon Liberals in the 2000 election; however, incumbent Liberal Cabinet minister-turned-independent MLA Don Roberts, had opted not to seek re-election. Kenyon won Porter Creek North with nearly half the vote and joined the new Yukon Premier, Dennis Fentie, in defeating the Liberals and forming government.

Fentie appointed Kenyon to Cabinet on November 30, 2002, as the Minister of the Environment. Kenyon held that portfolio until a Cabinet shuffle in 2004 when Fentie appointed him Minister of Economic Development, Minister responsible for the Yukon Housing Corporation, and Minister responsible for the Yukon Liquor Corporation. The portfolio had briefly existed under the Liberal government of Pat Duncan and was once again constituted by Fentie.

During his first mandate, Kenyon was subject to a conflict of interest declaration when the Department of Education refused to fund a student seat (at a cost of $25,000 for the territory) at the Western College of Veterinary Medicine for a former student - one of Kenyon's constituents - who wished to opt out of the program. Opposition parties requested an investigation from the Conflicts Commissioner due to concern that Kenyon was acting in his self-interest in the possibility that the student/constituent could later practice at Kenyon's private clinic. Ultimately, no conflict of interest was found.

=== 32nd Legislative Assembly ===
Kenyon sought re-election in Porter Creek North in the 2006 Yukon general election. He won comfortably and re-assumed his portfolios in the Fentie government. He was also appointed to the positions of Minister responsible for the Yukon Energy Corporation and the Yukon Development Corporation in a 2008 Cabinet shuffle. During his time as Minister of Economic Development, Kenyon received criticism for the number of trade missions he undertook to China, with the Opposition even claiming that Kenyon had fallen victim to Chinese immigration scamming.

As Economic Development Minister, Kenyon also oversaw the termination of the Yukon Government's 'Yukon Hire' policy, which granted preferential access to government hiring and contract opportunities to Yukoners.

Kenyon remained in Fentie's Cabinet until May 2011.

=== Leadership Run ===
In early 2011, Premier Dennis Fentie announced his decision to retire from politics. Kenyon opted to run in the race to succeed Fentie, competing against local pharmacist and former Conservative candidate Darrell Pasloski and tour operator Rod Taylor. Kenyon ran on his record as minister.

During the race, Kenyon was particularly critical of Fentie's leadership during the latter's closeted attempt to sell-off Yukon Energy assets to Alberta-based ATCO Electric. Kenyon, who was the minister responsible for the Yukon Energy Corporation as the controversy over the attempted asset sale erupted, asserted that Fentie had overstepped his authority in the matter.

On May 4, 2011, Dennis Fentie fired Kenyon from Cabinet – officially due to campaign conflicts with his portfolio as minister. Fentie refused to comment on the termination, though Kenyon stated he was fired due to his criticisms of Fentie. Kenyon was replaced in his Cabinet responsibilities by rookie MLA Steve Nordick. Notably, Kenyon also complained that Fentie's move was a spiteful one targeting, in part, his pension and salary.

Kenyon, who also lacked any endorsements from his caucus colleagues, stayed in the race. However, Pasloski was ultimately victorious in the May 28, 2011 vote. He won 767 votes, defeating Rod Taylor and his 436 votes. Kenyon received just 47 votes.

Pasloski later re-admitted Kenyon to his Cabinet, citing the need for party unity on the eve of the 2011 Yukon election. Kenyon was appointed as Minister responsible for the Yukon Development Corporation and the Yukon Energy Corporation.

Kenyon attempted to seek re-election in the riding of Porter Creek North, but was defeated in his bid for the Yukon Party nomination by Whitehorse City Councillor Doug Graham, who had originally indicated a preference to run for the Yukon Liberal Party. Kenyon lost by what the Yukon Party labelled a 'significant margin'. Graham was subsequently elected MLA for Porter Creek North.

== Personal life ==
Kenyon practiced as a veterinary surgeon for 37 years before entering politics. As a veterinarian, he was instrumental in establishing permanent veterinary facilities in the Yukon in the 1980s. His clinic, Yukon Veterinary Services Clinic, is the largest veterinarian facility in the Canadian territories.

Kenyon is also a former auxiliary police officer.

== Electoral record ==
=== Yukon general election, 2006 ===
Porter Creek North
Party	Candidate	Votes	%	±%
Yukon Party	Jim Kenyon	311	47.0%	+1.7%
Liberal	Dale Cheeseman	191	28.9%	+8.7%
NDP	Dave Hobbis	158	23.9%	+5.7%
Total		661	100.0%	–

=== Yukon general election, 2002 ===
Porter Creek North
Party	Candidate	Votes	%	±%
Yukon Party	Jim Kenyon	331	45.3%	+11.2
Liberal	Dave Austin	148	20.2%	-33.1%
NDP	Mark Bowers	135	18.5%	15.4%
Independent	Roger Rondeau	112	15.3%	+3.2
Total		731	100.0%	–

=== Canadian federal election, 2000 ===
2000 Canadian federal election
Party	Candidate	Votes	%	±%	Expenditures
Liberal	Larry Bagnell	4,293	32.5%	+10.5%	$48,252
New Democratic	Louise Hardy	4,223	31.9%	+3.0%	$65,576
Alliance	Jim Kenyon	3,659	27.7%	+2.4%	$31,121
Progressive Conservative	Don Cox	991	7.5%	-6.5%	$6,316
No Affiliation	Geoffrey Capp	53	0.4%	-0.6%	$1,044
Total valid votes		13,219	100.0%	–	–
Total rejected ballots		53	0.4%	–	–
Turnout		13,272	63.5%	–	–
Liberal gain from New Democratic		Swing		+3.8%	

- Geoffrey Capp was a Christian Heritage candidate, but the party lacked registered status.
- Canadian Alliance change is based on the former Reform Party.
