= Riverdale South =

Territorial electoral district in the Yukon, Canada

Yukon electoral district
- Boundaries of Riverdale South in Whitehorse

Territorial electoral district
- Legislature: Yukon Legislative Assembly
MLA
Justin Ziegler
New Democratic
- First contested: 1978
- Last contested: 2025

Demographics
- Electors (2021): 1,691
- Census division: Yukon
- Census subdivision: Whitehorse

Riverdale South is a territorial electoral district of Yukon that has been represented in the Yukon Legislative Assembly since 1978.

From 2016 to 2025, the district was represented by Tracy-Anne McPhee, former Minister of Education and Minister of Health and Social Services.

== Geography ==
Riverdale South comprises the southern portion of the Whitehorse neighbourhood of Riverdale, located east of the Yukon River. The district includes residential areas south of Lewes Boulevard, along with the Grey Mountain area. It is bordered by the ridings of Riverdale North, Whitehorse Centre, Copperbelt South, and Marsh Lake-Mount Lorne-Golden Horn.

== Members of the Legislative Assembly ==
Assembly	Years	Member	Party
Riverdale South
24th	1978–1980	Iain MacKay	Liberal
24th	1981–1982	Ron Veale	Liberal
25th	1982–1985	Bea Firth	Progressive Conservative
26th	1985–1989	Bea Firth	Progressive Conservative
27th	1989–1991	Bea Firth	Progressive Conservative
27th	1991–1992	Bea Firth	Independent
28th	1992–1996	Bea Firth	Independent
29th	1996–2000	Sue Edelman	Liberal
30th	2000–2002	Sue Edelman	Liberal
31st	2002–2006	Glenn Hart	Yukon Party
32nd	2006–2011	Glenn Hart	Yukon Party
33rd	2011–2016	Jan Stick	New Democratic
34th	2016–2021	Tracy-Anne McPhee	Liberal
35th	2021–2025	Tracy-Anne McPhee	Liberal
36th	2025–present	Justin Ziegler	New Democratic

== Election history ==
=== 2025 ===
2025 Yukon general election
** Preliminary results — Not yet official **
Party	Candidate	Votes	%	±%
New Democratic	Justin Ziegler	434	44.4	
Yukon Party	Aurora Viernes	339	34.7	
Liberal	Sunny Patch	204	20.9	
Total valid votes				
Total rejected ballots				
Turnout				
Eligible voters				
Source(s) "Unofficial Election Results 2025". Elections Yukon.

=== 2021 ===
2021 Yukon general election
Party	Candidate	Votes	%	±%
Liberal	Tracy-Anne McPhee	415	39.29	+2.1%
New Democratic	Jason Cook	334	31.62	-2.4%
Yukon Party	Cynthia Lyslo	307	29.07	+0.5%
Total valid votes		1,056		
Total rejected ballots				
Turnout				
Eligible voters				
Liberal hold		Swing		+1.28
Source(s) "Unofficial Election Results 2021". Elections Yukon.

=== 2016 ===
2016 Yukon general election
Party	Candidate	Votes	%	±%
Liberal	Tracy-Anne McPhee	421	37.2%	+8.9%
NDP	Jan Stick	384	34.0%	-5.2%
Yukon Party	Danny Macdonald	323	28.6%	-3.8%
Total		1128	100.0%	–

=== 2011 ===
2011 Yukon general election
Party	Candidate	Votes	%	±%
NDP	Jan Stick	380	39.2%	+18.7%
Yukon Party	Glenn Hart	314	32.4%	-11.9%
Liberal	Dan Curtis	275	28.3%	-9.5%
Total		969	100.0%	–

=== 2006 ===
2006 Yukon general election
Party	Candidate	Votes	%	±%
Yukon Party	Glenn Hart	357	41.6%	+1.9%
Liberal	Phil Treusch	324	37.8%	+3.6%
NDP	Peter Lesniak	176	20.5%	-5.6%
Total		857	100.0%	–

=== 2002 ===
2002 Yukon general election
Party	Candidate	Votes	%	±%
Yukon Party	Glenn Hart	385	39.7%	+16.0%
Liberal	Sue Edelman	332	34.2%	-14.7%
NDP	Cary Gryba	253	26.1%	-1.3%
Total		970	100.0%	–

=== 2000 ===
2000 Yukon general election
Party	Candidate	Votes	%	±%
Liberal	Sue Edelman	422	48.9%	-8.8%
NDP	Heather Finton	237	27.4%	+27.4%
Yukon Party	Ginny Macdonald	205	23.7%	-18.6%
Total		864	100.0%	

=== 1996 ===
1996 Yukon general election
Party	Candidate	Votes	%	±%
Liberal	Sue Edelman	476	57.7%	+52.7%
Yukon Party	Barbara Toombs	349	42.3%	+12.0%
Total		825	100.0%	–

=== 1992 ===
1992 Yukon general election
Party		Candidate	Votes	%	±%
}	Independent	Bea Firth	384	39.7%	–
	Yukon Party	Dale Stokes	293	30.3%	–
	NDP	Maurice Byblow	242	25.0%	–
	Liberal	Paul Thériault	48	5.0%	–
Total			967	100.0%	–

== See also ==
- List of Yukon territorial electoral districts
- Canadian provincial electoral districts
