= 2006 Yukon general election =

Canadian territorial election

- October 10, 2006

18 seats of the Yukon Legislative Assembly 10 seats needed for a majority
- Turnout: 72.90%(▲5.23pp)
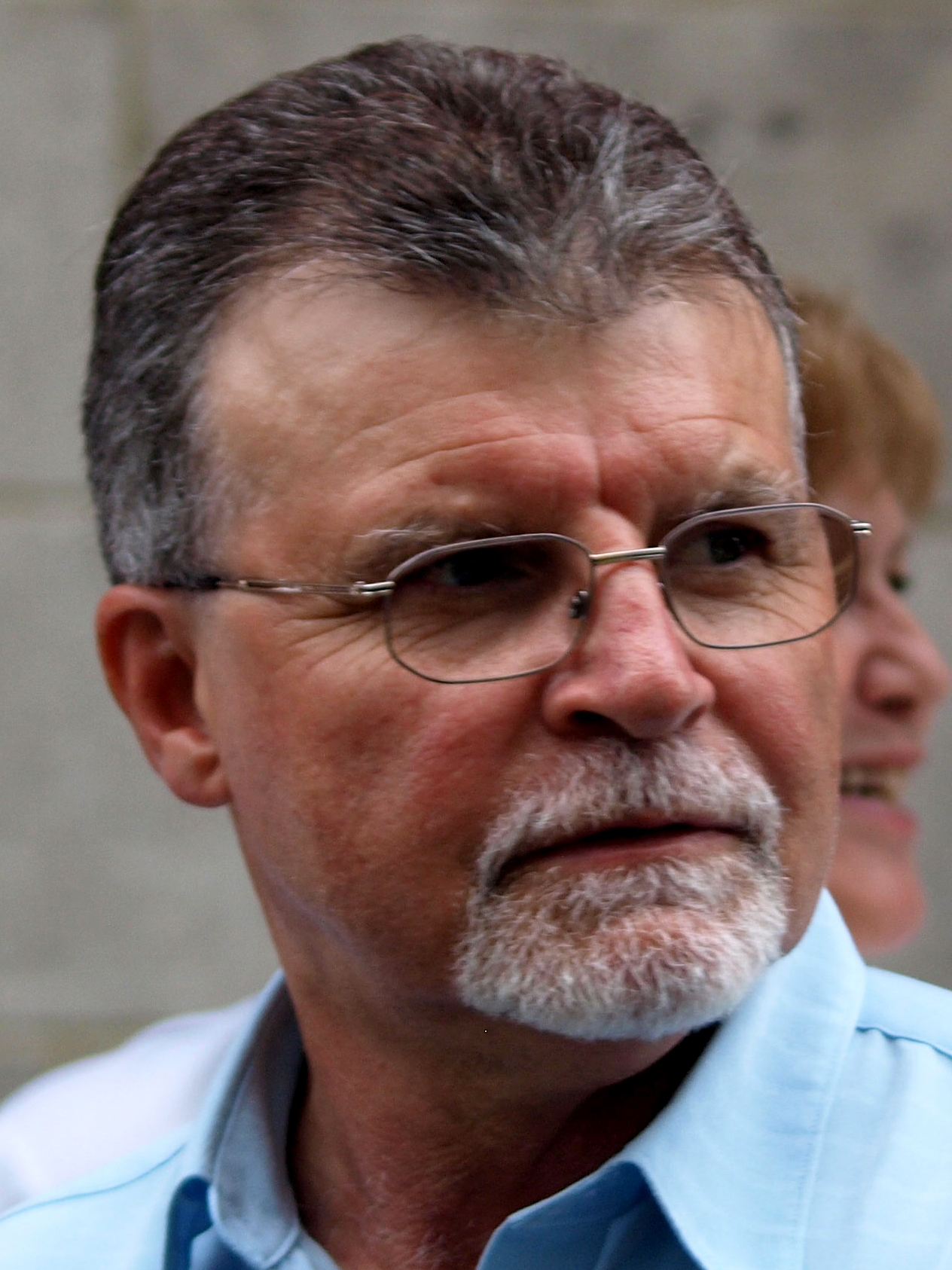
	First party	Second party	Third party
		YLP	NDP
Leader	Dennis Fentie	Arthur Mitchell	Todd Hardy
Party	Yukon Party	Liberal	New Democratic
Leader since	2002	2005	2002
Leader's seat	Watson Lake	Copperbelt	Whitehorse Centre
Last election	12	1	5
Seats won	10	5	3
Seat change	▼2	▲4	▼2
Popular vote	5,503	4,704	3,197
Percentage	40.6%	34.7%	23.6%
Swing	▲0.3pp	▲5.7pp	▼3.3pp
- Popular vote by riding. As this is an FPTP election, seat totals are not determined by popular vote, but instead via results by each riding. Click the map for more details.
Premier before election
Dennis Fentie
Yukon Party
Premier after election
Dennis Fentie
Yukon Party

The 2006 Yukon general election was held on October 10, 2006, in Yukon, Canada, to elect members of the 32nd Yukon Legislative Assembly. The Premier of Yukon asked the territorial Commissioner for a dissolution of the Assembly on September 8, 2006. Because of changes in the Yukon Act, the Yukon Party government's mandate resulting from this election is for as long as five years instead of four.

== Results ==
=== By party ===
Party	Party leader	# of candidates	Seats				Popular vote	
Party	Party leader	# of candidates	2002	Dissolution	Elected	% Change	#	%
Yukon Party	Dennis Fentie	18	12	9	10	-16.7	5,503	40.6
Liberal	Arthur Mitchell	18	1	4	5	+400.0	4,704	34.7
New Democratic	Todd Hardy	18	5	3	3	-40.0	3,197	23.6
Independents		4	0	2	0	-	143	1.1
Total		58	18	18	18	-	13,547	100.0

=== By region ===
Party name		Whitehorse	Rural	Total
Yukon Party	Seats:	5	5	10
Yukon Party	Popular vote:	38.9%	42.9%	40.6%
Liberal	Seats:	2	3	5
Liberal	Popular vote:	38.3%	30.0%	34.7%
New Democratic Party	Seats:	2	1	3
New Democratic Party	Popular vote:	22.8%	24.6%	23.6%
Independent	Seats:	(no candidate)	0	0
Independent	Popular vote:	(no candidate)	2.5%	1.1%
Total seats:		9	9	18

=== By rank ===
Party	Seats	Second	Third	Fourth
Yukon Party	10	5	3	0
Liberal	5	9	4	0
New Democratic	3	4	11	0
Independents	0	0	0	4

== Changes since the last election ==
- Haakon Arntzen leaves the Yukon Party caucus after investigations into several sexual assault cases in the 70's and the 80's began. While serving as an independent, he was found guilty. The Opposition called for his resignation, however this was rebuffed by the Government who believed he should be sentenced first.
- The Liberal Party held a leadership race after Pat Duncan lost the previous election moving from government to only one seat and third place. The party chose Arthur Mitchell over Duncan to lead the party.
- Arntzen resigns from the legislature on September 9, 2005. A by-election was held on November 21, 2005 to fill the Copperbelt seat and Liberal leader Arthur Mitchell won the election with almost 50% of the vote.
- Peter Jenkins, member for Klondike, resigns from Yukon Party, November 28, 2005 and from the cabinet after a dispute with the Premier over the payment of loans.
- Gary McRobb, member for Kluane, and Eric Fairclough, member for Mayo-Tatchun were expelled from the New Democratic Party (NDP) on February 28, 2006 and March 1, 2006 respectively when it is learned that they are exploring the possibility of running as independents or Liberals in the next election.
- McRobb (on March 17, 2006) and Fairclough (on May 1, 2006) both joined the Liberal caucus. Fairclough's joining brought the Liberals ahead of the NDP making them the official opposition.
- Edzerza on August 2, 2006 resigned from cabinet and the Yukon Party caucus; the following day, Edzerza said he would seek the NDP nomination in his riding. In accordance with NDP policy, Edzerza is to sit as an independent until nominated and elected as an NDP candidate.

== Campaign slogans ==
- Yukon Party: Imagine tomorrow
- Yukon Liberal Party: Putting people first
- Yukon New Democratic Party: Leading the way

== Results by riding ==
names in bold indicate cabinet ministers, names in italics are party leaders

=== Rural Yukon ===
Electoral district	Candidates				Incumbent
Electoral district	Yukon	Liberal	NDP	Other	Incumbent
Klondike	Steve Nordick; 405	Steve Taylor; 132	Jorn Meier; 297	Glen Everitt; 56	Peter Jenkins
Kluane	Jim Bowers; 176	Gary McRobb; 317	Lillian Grubach-Hambrook; 82	Freddy Hutter; 19	Gary McRobb
Lake Laberge	**Brad Cathers**; 458	Jon Breen; 221	Nina Sutherland; 120		**Brad Cathers**
Mayo-Tatchun	Jean VanBibber; 166	Eric Fairclough; 301	Karen Gage; 99		Eric Fairclough
Mount Lorne	Valerie Boxall; 236	Colleen Wirth; 231	Steve Cardiff; 361		Steve Cardiff
Pelly-Nisutlin	Marian Horne; 241	Hammond Dick; 145	Gwen Wally; 146	Elvis Aaron Presley ("Tagish" Elvis Presley); 40	Dean Hassard
Southern Lakes	Patrick Rouble; 276	Ethel Tizya; 134	Kevin Barr; 238		Patrick Rouble
Vuntut Gwitchin	William Josie; 38	Darius Elias; 64	Lorraine Peter; 40		Lorraine Peter
Watson Lake	**Dennis Fentie**; 495	Rick Harder; 196	Rachael Lewis; 45	Dale Robert Worsfold; 28	**Dennis Fentie**

=== Whitehorse ===
Electoral district	Candidates				Incumbent
Electoral district	Yukon	Liberal	NDP	Other	Incumbent
Copperbelt	Russ Hobbis; 374	Arthur Mitchell; 632	David Hedmann; 191		Arthur Mitchell
McIntyre-Takhini	Vicki Durrant; 201	Ed Schultz; 328	John Edzerza; 334		John Edzerza
Porter Creek Centre	**Archie Lang**; 344	David Laxton; 224	Kate White; 159		**Archie Lang**
Porter Creek North	**Jim Kenyon**; 311	Dale Cheeseman; 191	Dave Hobbis; 158		**Jim Kenyon**
Porter Creek South	Dean Hassard; 298	Don Inverarity; 304	Samson Hartland; 97		Pat Duncan
Riverdale North	Ted Staffen; 429	Lesley Cabott; 373	James McCullough; 172		Ted Staffen
Riverdale South	**Glenn Hart**; 357	Phil Treusch; 324	Peter Lesniak; 226		**Glenn Hart**
Whitehorse Centre	Jerry Johnson; 190	Bernie Phillips; 211	Todd Hardy; 357		Todd Hardy
Whitehorse West	**Elaine Taylor**; 511	Mike Walton; 371	Rhoda Merkel; 75		**Elaine Taylor**

== Opinion polls ==
DataPath polling chart

Trendlines polling chart

Polling Firm	Date	YP	Lib	NDP	Ind
Results of Election 2002		40	29	27	4
DataPath	July 2002	23	35	35	5
DataPath	March 2004	31	26	22	21
DataPath	February 2005	31	23	33	13
DataPath	May 2005	28	29	30	13
DataPath	August 2005	30	21	43	6
TrendLines	August 2005	35	30	34	
TrendLines	September 2005	35	29	35	
TrendLines	October 2005	32	32	36	
DataPath	December 2005	25	31	35	9
TrendLines	January 2006	26	34	37	2
TrendLines	March 2006	31	32	33	4
TrendLines	May 2006	27	27	29	17
DataPath	May 2006	29	31	33	7
TrendLines	June 2006	26	26	27	21
TrendLines	July 2006	35	33	23	10
DataPath	August 2006	33	30	31	6
TrendLines	September 2006	32	39	23	7
DataPath	October 2006	34	37	25	4
TrendLines	October 2006	35	32	31	2
Results of Election 2006		41	35	24	1

Trendlines polls from October 2005 to June 2006 are based on a 100-day rolling average. Trendlines polls from July 2006 to October 2006 only include the respective monthly figures.

Trendlines has conducted a poll in every riding every month for several months. According to the September/October polls, the Yukon Party could form a minority government with 7 of the 18 seats; or the Liberal Party and NDP could form a majority coalition with 11 out of the 18 seats.

Trendlines Riding polls
District	YP	Lib	NDP	Ind
Copperbelt	28	56	16	0
Klondike	23	14	55	9
Kluane	14	36	43	7
Lake Laberge	34	31	28	6*
McIntyre-Takhini	46	15	38	0
Mayo-Tatchun	33	50	17	0
Mount Lorne	32	18	50	0
Pelly-Nisutlin	42	8	25	25
Porter Creek Centre	50	35	15	0
Porter Creek North	29	29	43	0
Porter Creek South	35	55	10	0
Riverdale North	33	40	27	0
Riverdale South	50	25	25	0
Southern Lakes	32	14	46	7
Vuntut Gwitchin	14	57	29	0
Watson Lake	63	17	13	8
Whitehorse Centre	10	20	70	0
Whitehorse West	55	41	5	0
Totals	7	5	6	0

*Independent candidate Tim Zeigdel has since withdrawn.

- TrendLines Research
