= Riverdale North =

Territorial electoral district in the Yukon, Canada

Yukon electoral district
- Boundaries of Riverdale North in Whitehorse

Territorial electoral district
- Legislature: Yukon Legislative Assembly
MLA
Carmen Gustafson
New Democratic
- First contested: 1978
- Last contested: 2025

Demographics
- Electors (2021): 1,647
- Census division: Yukon
- Census subdivision: Whitehorse

Riverdale North is an electoral district which elects a Member of the Legislative Assembly (MLA) to the Legislative Assembly of the Yukon Territory in Canada. Along with Riverdale South, it makes up the subdivision of Whitehorse of Riverdale. The district also includes the residents of Long Lake Road.

As of 2021, Riverdale North is bordered by the Whitehorse ridings of Riverdale South, Whitehorse Centre, Takhini-Kopper King, Porter Creek North, and Porter Creek Centre, as well as the rural riding of Mount Lorne-Southern Lakes.

== MLAs ==
Legislature	Years	Member	Party
24th	1978–1982	Chris Pearson	Progressive Conservative
25th	1982–1985	Chris Pearson	Progressive Conservative
26th	1985–1989	Doug Phillips	Progressive Conservative
27th	1989–1992	Doug Phillips	Progressive Conservative
27th	1991–1992	Doug Phillips	Yukon Party
28th	1992–1996	Doug Phillips	Yukon Party
29th	1996–2000	Doug Phillips	Yukon Party
30th	2000–2002	Dale Eftoda	Yukon Liberal Party
31st	2002–2006	Ted Staffen	Yukon Party
32nd	2006–2011	Ted Staffen	Yukon Party
33rd	2011–2016	Scott Kent	Yukon Party
34th	2016–2021	Nils Clarke	Liberal
35th	2021–2025	Nils Clarke	Liberal
36th	2025–present	Carmen Gustafson	New Democratic

== Election history ==
=== 2025 ===
2025 Yukon general election
** Preliminary results — Not yet official **
Party	Candidate	Votes	%	±%
New Democratic	Carmen Gustafson	462	44.2	
Yukon Party	Rose Sellars	404	38.6	
Liberal	Mark Kelly	180	17.2	
Total valid votes		1,046		
Total rejected ballots				
Turnout				
Eligible voters				
Source(s) "Unofficial Election Results 2025". Elections Yukon.

=== 2021 ===
2021 Yukon general election
Party	Candidate	Votes	%	±%
Liberal	Nils Clarke	469	41.72	-1.8%
New Democratic	Vanessa Thorson	375	33.36	+3.2%
Yukon Party	Cory Adams	280	24.91	+1.8%
Total valid votes		1,124		
Total rejected ballots				
Turnout				
Eligible voters				
Liberal hold		Swing		-8.405
Source(s) "Unofficial Election Results 2021". Elections Yukon.

=== 2016 ===
2016 Yukon general election
Party	Candidate	Votes	%	±%
Liberal	Nils Clarke	486	43.5%	+14.2%
New Democratic	Rod Snow	337	30.2%	+0.2%
Yukon Party	Mark Beese	258	23.1%	-14.0%
Green	Kristina Calhoun	36	3.2%	-0.3%
Total		1117	100.0%	–

=== 2011 ===
2011 Yukon general election
Party	Candidate	Votes	%	±%
Yukon Party	Scott Kent	366	37.1%	-6.9%
New Democratic	Peter Lesniak	296	30.0%	+12.4%
Liberal	Christie Richardson	289	29.3%	-9.0%
Green	Kristina Calhoun	35	3.5%	+3.5%
Total		986	100.0%	–

=== 2006 ===
2006 Yukon general election
Party	Candidate	Votes	%	±%
Yukon Party	Ted Staffen	429	44.0%	+0.5%
Liberal	Lesley Cabott	373	38.3%	+3.6%
NDP	James McCullough	172	17.6%	-4.2%
Total		974	100.0%	–

=== 2002 ===
2002 Yukon general election
Party	Candidate	Votes	%	±%
Yukon Party	Ted Staffen	446	43.5%	+23.5%
Liberal	Dale Eftoda	355	34.7%	-18.2%
NDP	Jan Slipetz	223	21.8%	-5.3%
Total		1024	100.0%	–

=== 2000 ===
2000 Yukon general election
Party	Candidate	Votes	%	±%
Liberal	Dale Eftoda	454	52.9%	+37.4%
NDP	Rachael Lewis	233	27.1%	-9.7%
Yukon Party	Daphne White	172	20.0%	-27.7%
Total		859	100.0%	–

=== 1996 ===
1996 Yukon general election
Party	Candidate	Votes	%	±%
Yukon Party	Doug Phillips	450	47.7%	-10.6%
NDP	Dave Stockdale	347	36.8%	+6.2%
Liberal	Flo Leblanc-Hutchinson	146	15.5%	+4.4%
Total		943	100.0%	–

=== 1992 ===
1992 Yukon general election
Party	Candidate	Votes	%	±%
Yukon Party	Doug Phillips	557	58.3%	–
NDP	Lucy Van Oldenbarneveld	292	30.6%	–
Liberal	Lesley Cabott	106	11.1%	–
Total		955	100.0%	–

== See also ==
- List of Yukon territorial electoral districts
- Canadian provincial electoral districts
