= Elaine Taylor (politician) =

Canadian politician

Deputy Premier of the Yukon
- In office 12 December 2005 – 3 December 2016
- Premier: Dennis Fentie; Darrell Pasloski
- Preceded by: Peter Jenkins
- Succeeded by: Ranj Pillai

Minister of Tourism and Culture
- In office 16 January 2015 – 3 December 2016
- Premier: Darrell Pasloski
- Preceded by: Mike Nixon
- Succeeded by: Jeanie Dendys
- In office 30 November 2002 – 5 November 2011
- Premier: Dennis Fentie
- Preceded by: Dale Eftoda
- Succeeded by: Mike Nixon

Minister of Education
- In office 5 August 2013 – 16 January 2015
- Premier: Darrell Pasloski
- Preceded by: Scott Kent
- Succeeded by: Doug Graham
- In office 2 August 2006 – 28 October 2006
- Premier: Dennis Fentie
- Preceded by: John Edzerza
- Succeeded by: Patrick Rouble

Minister of Community Services
- In office 5 November 2011 – 5 August 2013
- Premier: Darrell Pasloski
- Preceded by: Archie Lang
- Succeeded by: Brad Cathers

Minister of the Public Service Commission
- In office 4 February 2010 – 5 August 2013
- Premier: Dennis Fentie; Darrell Pasloski
- Preceded by: Patrick Rouble
- Succeeded by: Currie Dixon
- In office 12 July 2004 – 28 October 2006
- Premier: Dennis Fentie
- Preceded by: John Edzerza
- Succeeded by: Glenn Hart

Minister of the Environment
- In office 3 July 2008 – 4 February 2010
- Premier: Dennis Fentie
- Preceded by: Dennis Fentie
- Succeeded by: John Edzerza

Minister of Justice
- In office 2 August 2006 – 28 October 2006
- Premier: Dennis Fentie
- Preceded by: John Edzerza
- Succeeded by: Marian Horne
- In office 30 November 2002 – 12 July 2004
- Preceded by: Pam Buckway
- Succeeded by: John Edzerza

Member of the Yukon Legislative Assembly for Whitehorse West
- In office 4 November 2002 – 3 December 2016
- Preceded by: Dennis Schneider
- Succeeded by: Richard Mostyn

Personal details
- Born: 3 December 1967 (age 58) Watson Lake, Yukon
- Party: Yukon Party
- Occupation: Politician; Political Staffer

Elaine Taylor (born 3 December 1967 in Watson Lake, Yukon) is a Canadian politician. She is the former Deputy Premier of the Yukon and represented the electoral district of Whitehorse West in the Yukon Legislative Assembly. First elected in 2002, and re-elected in 2006 and 2011, she was defeated in the 2016 Yukon general election by Richard Mostyn of the Yukon Liberal Party.

At the time of her defeat, she was the longest continuously serving Cabinet minister in Canada and longest-serving Cabinet minister in the Yukon.

She is a member of the Yukon Party.

== Political career ==
Taylor first attempted to enter electoral politics in the 2000 Yukon election by contesting New Democrat Cabinet minister Dave Sloan for his seat of Whitehorse West. Whitehorse West, the former seat of Yukon Government Leader Tony Penikett, had been held by the New Democrats since it was first established in 1978. Taylor, running for the Yukon Party, and Sloan, both lost to Liberal candidate Dennis Schneider, with Taylor finishing in third. Schneider had won as part of the Liberals' sweep of the City of Whitehorse during that election.

=== 31st Legislative Assembly ===
Taylor tried again to capture Whitehorse West in the 2002 election against Schneider. The short-lived Liberal government of Pat Duncan had called a snap election in an effort to shore up its political support after a series of high-profile Cabinet defections reduced it to a minority government. Taylor was successful in capturing the riding from Schneider, and joined the Dennis Fentie's Yukon Party caucus in forming a majority government. It was the first time the Yukon Party had succeeded in capturing the riding of Whitehorse West, though the nature of the riding had changed significantly since 1978.

Taylor was sworn into Cabinet on 30 November 2002, as the Minister of Business, Tourism and Culture (later renamed to Tourism and Culture) and Minister of Justice. She was the only woman in both Cabinet and the Yukon Party caucus during her first term.

Taylor was later appointed Minister of the Public Service Commission in July 2004, taking over from Cabinet minister John Edzerza who in turn inherited her portfolio of Justice. In that same shuffle, Taylor gained responsibility for the Women's Directorate portfolio, which had been previously reduced to a branch of the Cabinet Offices under the Pat Duncan government. Taylor had been tasked with returning the Women's Directorate to a ministerial portfolio when she was first sworn into Cabinet.

Taylor's higher profile in the Yukon Party caucus during its first term led Premier Fentie to name her acting Deputy Premier in December 2005, following the resignation of incumbent Peter Jenkins from Cabinet over an expense dispute with the Yukon Government. Fentie made Taylor's position permanent in January 2008.

Taylor's role in the Yukon Party caucus became even more prominent in August 2006 when Cabinet minister John Edzerza defected from the Yukon Party caucus to run for the New Democrats in the 2006 election. Taylor inherited Edzerza's portfolios of Education and Justice - the latter of which she had surrendered to Edzerza in 2004 - until the election scheduled for October 2006.

=== 32nd Legislative Assembly ===
Taylor sought re-election in Whitehorse West in the 2006 election and was re-elected by a large margin. She was once again sworn into Cabinet, retaining her interim Deputy Premier title and her position as Minister of Tourism and Culture and Minister responsible for the Women's Directorate. Her portfolios of the Public Service Commission, Education, and Justice were transferred to other colleagues.

During the 32nd Assembly, Taylor served as the Government House Leader, and also as Chair of the Legislative Overview Committee, the Cabinet Committee on Legislation, and the Standing Committee on Appointments to Major Government Boards and Committees. She was also a member of the Standing Committee on Rules, Elections and Privileges.

In a 2008 Cabinet shuffle, Taylor handed over responsibility for the Women's Directorate portfolio to Justice Minister Marian Horne, but Fentie appointed her once again as Minister of the Environment in July 2008; a portfolio Fentie had held since the 2006 election. Taylor held the Environment post until 2010 when, in a surprise move, now-New Democrat MLA John Edzerza once again crossed the floor the Yukon Party. Fentie had lost his majority when Cabinet minister Brad Cathers had left caucus to sit as an independent when it was revealed that Fentie had been engaged in secret talks to privatize Yukon Energy through a sale to ATCO Electric. Cathers resigned in protest over Fentie's lack of transparency and treatment of both ministers and political staff. Edzerza's floor crossing re-established Fentie's majority in the legislature. Taylor, though publicly upset about having to surrender the Environment portfolio, nevertheless complied.

In 2011, Fentie announced that he would resign as Premier and leader of the Yukon Party. Taylor chose to endorse local businessman Rod Taylor (no relation) for the Yukon Party leadership, but Rod Taylor pulled out of his leadership bid in favour of local pharmacist Darrell Pasloski, who had run unsuccessfully for the Conservatives in the federal riding of Yukon in the 2008 federal election. Despite having endorsed Pasloski's opponent, Taylor was kept on in her Deputy Premier capacity and remained in Cabinet.

=== 33rd Legislative Assembly ===
Taylor chose to seek re-election for a third term in the 2011 election in Whitehorse West. She once again won comfortably with more than half the vote and was appointed to Pasloski's Cabinet as Deputy Premier, Minister of Community Services, Minister of the Public Service Commission, Minister responsible for the Women's Directorate, the Minister responsible for the French Language Services Directorate. As Minister of Community Services, Taylor was handed responsibility for the beleaguered Whistle Bend subdivision development project that had been subject to slow progress and stagnant demand.

Taylor was shuffled into the position of Education minister in August 2013, taking over from Minister Scott Kent who had endured several controversies regarding his department's management of a string of controversies in the Catholic school system. Taylor remained in that position until Pasloski's final Cabinet shuffle in January 2015, when she once again retained responsibility for Tourism and Culture. Taylor stayed as Minister of Tourism and Culture, and kept her portfolio responsibilities for the Women's Directorate and the French Language Services Directorate for the rest of 33rd Assembly. By the end of the 33rd Assembly, Taylor was the longest-serving incumbent Cabinet minister in Canada and the longest-serving Cabinet minister in Yukon history.

Taylor sought another term in the 2016 election, but was narrowly defeated by a margin of 22 votes by Liberal candidate and former journalist Richard Mostyn. Taylor joined Premier Pasloski and Cabinet ministers Doug Graham and Mike Nixon in defeat on election night, when the Yukon Party was reduced to Official Opposition status by a Liberal majority government.

== Personal life ==
Prior to running for elected office, Taylor served as Executive Assistant to John Ostashek, Yukon Government Leader and leader of the Yukon Party, before his defeat in the 1996 Yukon election. She was also a researcher and constituency caseworker for the Yukon Party Caucus and a visitor receptionist in the Yukon Department of Tourism.

Taylor, born and raised in Watson Lake, Yukon, holds a Bachelor of Arts in political science from the University of Alberta.

== Electoral record ==
=== Yukon general election, 2016 ===
Whitehorse West
Party	Candidate	Votes	%	±%
Liberal	Richard Mostyn	455	45.8%	+17.1%
Yukon Party	Elaine Taylor	433	43.6%	-14.3%
NDP	Stu Clark	106	10.7%	-2.2%
Total		994	100.0%	–

=== Yukon general election, 2011 ===
Whitehorse West
Party	Candidate	Votes	%	±%
Yukon Party	Elaine Taylor	422	57.9%	+4.8%
Liberal	Cully Robinson	209	28.7%	-9.9%
NDP	Louis Gagnon	94	12.9%	+5.1%
Total		729	100.0%	–

=== Yukon general election, 2006 ===
Whitehorse West
Party	Candidate	Votes	%	±%
Yukon Party	Elaine Taylor	511	53.1%	+5.7%
Liberal	Mike Walton	371	38.6%	+0.6%
NDP	Rhoda Merkel	75	7.8%	-6.1%
Total		963	100.0%	–

=== Yukon general election, 2002 ===
Whitehorse West
Party	Candidate	Votes	%	±%
Yukon Party	Elaine Taylor	398	47.4%	+19.7%
Liberal	Dennis Schneider	319	38.0%	-2.5%
NDP	Rachel Grantham	117	13.9%	-17.4%
Total		840	100.0%	–

=== Yukon general election, 2000 ===
Whitehorse West
Party	Candidate	Votes	%	±%
Liberal	Dennis Schneider	621	40.5%	+8.4%
NDP	Dave Sloan	480	31.3%	-9.4%
Yukon Party	Elaine Taylor	425	27.7%	+0.7%
Total		1,535	100.0%	–
