= Porter Creek South =

Territorial electoral district in the Yukon, Canada

Yukon electoral district
- Boundaries of Porter Creek South in Whitehorse

Territorial electoral district
- Legislature: Yukon Legislative Assembly
MLA
Adam Gerle
Yukon Party
- First contested: 1992
- Last contested: 2025

Demographics
- Electors (2025): 921
- Census subdivision: Porter Creek

Porter Creek South is a territorial electoral district of Yukon that has been represented in the Yukon Legislative Assembly since 1992. It comprises part of the Whitehorse subdivision of Porter Creek and is the largest riding in Whitehorse.

Porter Creek South is also the former seat of Pat Duncan, 6th Premier of the Yukon, who served from 2000 to 2002. From 2016 to 2025, it was represented by Ranj Pillai, the 10th Premier of the Yukon.

== Geography ==
The riding is south of the Range Road extension, the intersection of Range Road and Whistle Bend Way south on Range Road south of Northland Mobile Home Park, west of Yukon University, south to the intersection of the Alaska Highway, south of the Kopper King Mobile Home Park to include Raven's Ridge, Fish Lake Road, and north and extending to the municipal boundaries.

It is bordered by the districts of Porter Creek Centre, Whistle Bend South, Takhini, Mountainview, Whitehorse West, Copperbelt North, Copperbelt South, Marsh Lake-Mount Lorne-Golden Horn, Kluane, and Lake Laberge.

== Members of the Legislative Assembly ==
Assembly	Years	Member	Party
Porter Creek South; Riding created from Whitehorse Porter Creek West and Whitehorse West
28th	1992–1996	Alan Nordling	Independent
29th	1996–2000	Pat Duncan	Liberal
30th	2000–2002	Pat Duncan	Liberal
31st	2002–2006	Pat Duncan	Liberal
32nd	2006–2011	Don Inverarity	Liberal
33rd	2011–2016	Mike Nixon	Yukon Party
34th	2016–2021	Ranj Pillai	Liberal
35th	2021–2025	Ranj Pillai	Liberal
36th	2025–Present	Adam Gerle	Yukon Party

== Election history ==
=== 2025 ===
2025 Yukon general election
** Preliminary results — Not yet official **
Party	Candidate	Votes	%	±%
Yukon Party	Adam Gerle	493	53.1	
New Democratic	Dario Paola	373	40.2	
Liberal	Harjit Mavi	62	6.7	
Total valid votes		928		
Total rejected ballots				
Turnout				
Eligible voters				
Yukon Party gain		Swing		
Source(s) "Unofficial Election Results 2025". Elections Yukon.

2021 Yukon general election redistributed results
Party	Votes	%
Liberal	309	40
Yukon Party	264	34
New Democratic	201	26

=== 2021 ===
2021 Yukon general election
Party	Candidate	Votes	%	±%
Liberal	Ranj Pillai	309	47.17	+0.6%
Yukon Party	Chad Sjodin	262	40	+0.6%
New Democratic	Colette Acheson	84	12.82	-1.3%
Total valid votes		655		
Total rejected ballots				
Turnout				
Eligible voters				
Liberal hold		Swing		-17.18
Source(s) "Unofficial Election Results 2021". Elections Yukon.

=== 2016 ===
2016 Yukon general election
Party	Candidate	Votes	%	±%
Liberal	Ranj Pillai	337	46.6%	+6.0%
Yukon Party	Mike Nixon	285	39.4%	-3.5%
NDP	Shirley Chua-Tan	102	14.1%	-2.4%
Total		724	100.0%	–

=== 2011 ===
2011 Yukon general election
Party	Candidate	Votes	%	±%
Yukon Party	Mike Nixon	257	42.9%	+0.3%
Liberal	Don Inverarity	243	40.6%	-2.8%
NDP	John Carney	99	16.5%	+2.6%
Total		599	100.0%	–

=== 2006 ===
2006 Yukon general election
Party	Candidate	Votes	%	±%
Liberal	Don Inverarity	304	43.4%	-8.3%
Yukon Party	Dean Hassard	298	42.6%	+4.5%
NDP	Samson Hartland	97	13.9%	+3.8%
Total		700	100.0%	–

=== 2002 ===
2002 Yukon general election
Party	Candidate	Votes	%	±%
Liberal	Pat Duncan	408	51.7%	-12.5%
Yukon Party	Lynn Ogden	301	38.1%	+13.3%
NDP	Paul Warner	80	10.1%	-0.7%
Total		789	100.0%	–

=== 2000 ===
2000 Yukon general election
Party	Candidate	Votes	%	±%
Liberal	Pat Duncan	607	64.2%	+21.3%
Yukon Party	Larry Carlyle	235	24.8%	-14.3%
NDP	Mark Dupuis	103	10.8%	-7.0%
Total		945	100.0%	–

=== 1996 ===
1996 Yukon general election
Party	Candidate	Votes	%	±%
Liberal	Pat Duncan	435	42.9%	+15.0%
Yukon Party	Alan Nordling	397	39.1%	+39.1%
NDP	Mark Dupuis	181	17.8%	-7.8%
Total		1013	100.0%	–

=== 1992 ===
1992 Yukon general election
Party	Candidate	Votes	%	±%
Independent	Alan Nordling	435	46.5%	–
Liberal	Shayne Fairman	261	27.9%	–
NDP	Brian McLaughlin	240	25.6%	–
Total		936	100.0%	–

== See also ==
- List of Yukon territorial electoral districts
- Canadian provincial electoral districts
