= Nils Clarke =

Canadian politician

The Honourable Nils Clarke

Speaker of the Yukon Legislative Assembly
- In office January 12, 2017 – May 11, 2021
- Preceded by: Patti McLeod
- Succeeded by: Jeremy Harper

Member of the Yukon Legislative Assembly for Riverdale North
- In office November 7, 2016 – October 3, 2025
- Preceded by: Scott Kent
- Succeeded by: Carmen Gustafson

Personal details
- Party: Yukon Liberal Party

Nils Clarke is a Canadian politician, who was elected to the Legislative Assembly of Yukon in the 2016 election. He represented the electoral district of Riverdale North as a member of the Yukon Liberal Party until 2025.

== Life and career ==
Clarke was a lawyer in the Yukon for 24 years, eventually becoming executive director of the Yukon Legal Services Society (Legal Aid). He holds a B.A. from the University of Toronto and an LL.B. from the University of British Columbia. Clarke was admitted to both the Law Society of Upper Canada and the Law Society of Yukon in 1992.

He was elected on November 7, 2016, as part of the election of the Yukon Liberal Party to a majority government. On January 12, 2017, he was sworn in as the 12th Speaker of the Yukon Legislative Assembly. As Speaker, he is also Chair of the Members’ Services Board.

On May 3, 2021, Clarke was named the Minister of Highways and Public Works and the Minister of Environment of Yukon.

He did not run in the 2025 Yukon general election.

== Electoral record ==
2021 Yukon general election: Riverdale North
Party	Candidate	Votes	%	±%
Liberal	Nils Clarke	469	41.72	-1.8%
New Democratic	Vanessa Thorson	375	33.36	+3.2%
Yukon Party	Cory Adams	280	24.91	+1.8%
Total valid votes		1,124		
Total rejected ballots				
Turnout				
Eligible voters				
Liberal hold		Swing		-8.405
Source(s) "Unofficial Election Results 2021". Elections Yukon.

=== 2016 general election ===
Riverdale North
Party	Candidate	Votes	%	±%
Liberal	Nils Clarke	486	43.5%	+14.2%
New Democratic	Rod Snow	337	30.2%	+0.2%
Yukon Party	Mark Beese	258	23.1%	-14.0%
Green	Kristina Calhoun	36	3.2%	-0.3%
Total		1117	100.0%	–
