= Whistle Bend South =

Territorial electoral district in the Yukon, Canada

Yukon electoral district
- Interactive map of riding boundaries

Territorial electoral district
- Legislature: Yukon Legislative Assembly
MLA
Linda Benoit
Yukon Party
- District created: 2024
- First contested: 2025

Demographics
- Population (2024): 1,850
- Electors (2024): 1,250
- Census division: Yukon
- Census subdivision: Whitehorse

Whistle Bend South is an electoral district which returns a member (known as an MLA) to the Yukon Legislative Assembly. In accordance with the Yukon Electoral District Boundaries Act (2024), it was first contested at the 2025 Yukon general election, as one of thirteen ridings in the City of Whitehorse.

== Geography ==
The riding is located in Whistle Bend, on the western bank of the Yukon River, southside of Keno Way and encompassing the entirety of Eldorado Drive. It is 3.80 square kilometres in area, making it the fifth smallest out of twenty-one ridings.

== History ==
Alongside Whistle Bend North, the riding was created out of Porter Creek Centre, due to rapid growth in the Whistle Bend Development (the fastest of any community in Yukon) that is expected to continue into the latter half of the decade. It borders Takhini and Porter Creek South, in addition to the aforementioned ridings of Whistle Bend North and Porter Creek Centre.

The number of votes in the riding will initially be lower relative to other ridings in Whitehorse because of a number of considerations of the Electoral District Boundaries Commission aimed towards better voter parity. Firstly, in anticipation of continued growth outpacing that of the rest of Yukon, the number of electors was set at a considerably lower level. Secondly, because Whistle Bend has a sizable amount of new development, many may not have yet registered to vote with their address in Whistle Bend. As of March 31, 2024, despite a population estimate of 3,760 that would usually represent an average of 2,632 electors, there were only 2,201 registered electors in Whistle Bend. However, as residents settle in, voter registrations should start to experience a sharp increase in the coming years.

Overall, while the variance from the electoral quotient starts out at −21%, it is expected to significantly surpass the electoral quotient with 2000+ electors by the end of 2025 and to eventually exceed a +25% variance with 3000+ electors by 2030, due to factors of population growth and self-correction of elector undercounts.

Assembly	Years	Member	Party
Whistle Bend North; Riding created from Porter Creek Centre
36th	2025–present	Linda Benoit	Yukon Party

== Election results ==
=== 2025 ===
2025 Yukon general election
Party	Candidate	Votes	%	±%
Yukon Party	Linda Benoit	344	45.99	+8.54
New Democratic	Dustin McKenzie-Hubbard	302	40.37	+18.56
Liberal	Vida Pelayo	102	13.64	–27.11
Total valid votes		748		
Total rejected ballots				
Turnout			54.16	
Eligible voters		1,381		
Yukon Party notional gain from Liberal		Swing		–5.01
Source(s) "2025 General Election Official Results". Elections Yukon.

2021 Yukon general election redistributed results
Party	Votes	%
Liberal	284	41
Yukon Party	261	38
New Democratic	152	22

== See also ==
- List of Yukon territorial electoral districts
- Canadian provincial electoral districts
