= Mike Nixon (politician) =

Canadian politician

MLA for Porter Creek South
- In office October 11, 2011 – November 7, 2016
- Preceded by: Don Inverarity
- Succeeded by: Ranj Pillai

Minister of Health and Social Services
- In office January 16, 2015 – December 3, 2016
- Preceded by: Doug Graham
- Succeeded by: Pauline Frost

Minister of Justice Minister of Tourism and Culture
- In office November 5, 2011 – January 16, 2015
- Preceded by: Marian Horne; Elaine Taylor
- Succeeded by: Brad Cathers; Elaine Taylor

Personal details
- Party: Yukon Party
- Occupation: Businessman

Mike Nixon is a Canadian politician, who was elected to in the Yukon Legislative Assembly in the 2011 election. He represented the electoral district of Porter Creek South as a member of the Yukon Party caucus until 2016.

== Political career ==
Nixon first attempted to enter politics as the Yukon Party candidate in Yukon New Democrat stronghold of Whitehorse Centre, which had been vacated following the death of New Democrat leader Todd Hardy from cancer. Nixon lost his bid to Hardy's successor, Liz Hanson, finishing third in the December 13, 2010 by-election.

Nixon sought election once again the following year during the 2011 Yukon election as the Yukon Party candidate in the Whitehorse riding of Porter Creek South, long-considered a Liberal stronghold. Nixon defeated Liberal incumbent Don Inverarity by just 14 votes. It was the first time the Yukon Party had been elected in the riding of Porter Creek South. Following the election, Nixon was appointed to the Cabinet of Yukon Premier Darrell Pasloski as Minister of Justice and Minister of Tourism and Culture.

In January 2015, Nixon was moved to Minister of Health and Social Services and Minister responsible for the Workers’ Compensation Health and Safety Board. He received criticism during his time as Minister of Health and Social Services for the government's inadequate planning of healthcare and continuing care spaces in the territory and for its failure to deliver an adequate mental health strategy.

Nixon announced his intention to seek re-election in the 2016 Yukon election, but was defeated by former Whitehorse city councillor and Yukon Liberal candidate Ranj Pillai. He was one of four Yukon Party Cabinet ministers to be defeated in that election, in which the party was reduced to Official Opposition status.

== Personal life ==
Nixon, originally from Niagara Falls, Ontario, has an honours diploma from Humber College. He moved to the Yukon in 1998. Nixon has owned and operated several businesses, including a graphics design company and a property management firm. He is also a co-founder of Autism Yukon.

Nixon is the former son-in-law of Yukon Conservative Senator Dan Lang and has served as President and Treasurer of the Yukon Party.

After his electoral defeat, Nixon became Vice-President of Property Management at Northern Vision Development.

== Electoral record ==
=== Yukon general election, 2016 ===
Porter Creek South
Party	Candidate	Votes	%	±%
Liberal	Ranj Pillai	337	46.6%	+6.0%
Yukon Party	Mike Nixon	285	39.4%	-3.5%
NDP	Shirley Chua-Tan	102	14.1%	-2.4%
Total		724	100.0%	–

=== Yukon general election, 2011 ===
Porter Creek South
Party	Candidate	Votes	%	±%
Yukon Party	Mike Nixon	257	42.9%	+0.3%
Liberal	Don Inverarity	243	40.6%	-2.8%
NDP	John Carney	99	16.5%	+2.6%
Total		599	100.0%	–

=== 2010 by-election ===
Whitehorse Centre
Party	Candidate	Votes	%	±%
NDP	Liz Hanson	356	51.6%	+5.0%
Liberal	Kirk Cameron	181	26.2%	-1.3%
Yukon Party	Mike Nixon	150	21.7%	-3.1%
Total		690	100.0%	–

- Held upon the death of Todd Hardy, July 28, 2010.
