= Bea Firth =

Canadian politician

MLA for Riverdale South
- In office 1982–1996
- Preceded by: Ron Veale
- Succeeded by: Sue Edelman

Personal details
- Born: January 27, 1946 Yorkton, Saskatchewan, Canada
- Died: June 20, 2008 (aged 62) Yukon, Canada
- Party: Progressive Conservative → Independent Alliance
- Spouse: Thomas P. Firth
- Occupation: nurse

Beatrice Ann Firth (January 27, 1946 – June 20, 2008) was a Canadian politician, who represented the electoral district of Riverdale South in the Yukon Legislative Assembly from 1982 to 1996. She was a member of the Yukon Progressive Conservative Party.

Born in Yorkton, Saskatchewan in 1946, she worked as a registered nurse before entering politics. Firth moved to Whitehorse in 1967 and worked at the Whitehorse General Hospital.

She first ran in a by-election in Riverdale South in 1981, losing to Ron Veale, but won the seat in the 1982 election. She sat as a member of the Yukon Progressive Conservative Party until 1991, when she was one of two MLAs, along with Alan Nordling, who quit the caucus in protest against the party's change of name to the Yukon Party. Firth and Nordling thereafter sat as the only members of the Independent Alliance.

Firth did not run in the 1996 election.

She died on June 20, 2008, of cancer.
