= Jan Stick =

Canadian politician

Member of the Yukon Legislative Assembly for Riverdale South
- In office October 11, 2011 – November 7, 2016
- Preceded by: Glenn Hart
- Succeeded by: Tracy McPhee

Whitehorse City Council
- In office 2018–2021
- In office 2005 – October 15, 2009
- Preceded by: Yvonne Harris

Personal details
- Party: New Democrat
- Occupation: Proprietor; Community worker

Jan Stick is a Canadian politician, who was elected to in the Yukon Legislative Assembly in the 2011 election. She represented the electoral district of Riverdale South as a member of the Yukon New Democratic Party caucus until her defeat in the 2016 election.

Prior to her election to the territorial legislature, Stick served on Whitehorse City Council. She has since returned to municipal politics, and served again as a member of Whitehorse's city council from 2018 until 2021.

== Political career ==
Stick entered Whitehorse municipal politics in 2005, running in a city council by-election to succeed incumbent councillor Yvonne Harris, who had resigned to move outside the territory. Stick was successful in her bid, and was re-elected in the 2006 municipal election with the highest share of the vote. As city councillor, Stick served on the city operations and community services committees, as well as the Association of Yukon Communities.

Stick did not seek another term in the 2009 election.

In 2011, Stick announced her intent to seek territorial office for the New Democrats in the Whitehorse riding of Riverdale South. She upset two-term incumbent Yukon Party Cabinet minister Glenn Hart, as well as Liberal Dan Curtis, the future Mayor of Whitehorse. It was the first time that the New Democrats captured the seat of Riverdale South.

During the 33rd Legislative Assembly, Stick served as Official Opposition House Leader for the New Democrats, as well as caucus critic for Health and Social Services, the Ombudsman & Information and Privacy Commissioner, Poverty Elimination and Social Inclusion, and Small Business. As Health and Social Services critic, Stick was vocal about the government's failure to plan adequate bed spaces in the territory's healthcare and continuing care facilities.

Stick announced her decision to seek re-election in Riverdale South in the 2016 Yukon election, but was defeated by Liberal and former Yukon Ombudsman, Tracy McPhee, in a close race. The New Democrats were reduced to third party status in that campaign.

Stick was elected to Whitehorse City Council for a third time in 2018.

== Personal life ==
Stick is a small business owner, operating a used bookstore, Well-Read Books, in Whitehorse. A former social service case manager, she has also sat on the board of the Association of Community Living and the Yukon Workers' Compensation Health and Safety Board's Appeal Tribunal. Stick was awarded the Yukon Commissioner's Award for Public Service and the Governor General's Caring Canadian Award for her community involvement.

== Electoral record ==
=== 2016 general election ===
Riverdale South
Party	Candidate	Votes	%	±%
Liberal	Tracy McPhee	421	37.2%	+8.9%
NDP	Jan Stick	384	34.0%	-5.2%
Yukon Party	Danny Macdonald	323	28.6%	-3.8%
Total		1128	100.0%	–

=== 2011 general election ===
Riverdale South
Party	Candidate	Votes	%	±%
NDP	Jan Stick	380	39.2%	+18.7%
Yukon Party	Glenn Hart	314	32.4%	-11.9%
Liberal	Dan Curtis	275	28.3%	-9.5%
Total		969	100.0%	–
