= Yukon First Nations Party =

Territorial political party in Canada

- Former territorial party
- Leader: Gerald Dickson Sr.
- Founded: September 6, 2011
- Dissolved: 2016
- Headquarters: Burwash Landing, Yukon
- Ideology: First Nation traditional laws
- Seats in Legislature: 0 / 19

The Yukon First Nation Party was a territorial First Nations political party in Yukon, Canada.

It was registered three days before the 2011 general election was called, by Gerald Dickson Sr., a member of the Kluane First Nation. Dickson created the party with the encouragement of several First Nation elders, who felt that their issues were not being heard. The party believed in sustaining the traditional laws of respect, honour, love, compassion, and harmony. The party did not field candidates for the 2016 Yukon general election, and was thus deregistered by Elections Yukon.

== Electoral record ==
General election	# of candidates	# of elected candidates	# of ridings	# of votes	% of popular vote	% of popular vote in contested ridings
2011	2	0	19	81	0.50	4.50
