= Don Inverarity =

Canadian politician

MLA for Porter Creek South
- In office 2006–2011
- Preceded by: Pat Duncan
- Succeeded by: Mike Nixon

Personal details
- Party: Liberal

Don Inverarity is a Canadian politician, who represented the electoral district of Porter Creek South in the Yukon Legislative Assembly from 2006 to 2011. He is a member of the Yukon Liberal Party.

== Political career ==
Elected in the 2006 Yukon election for Porter Creek South, Inverarity retained the seat for the Liberals following the retirement of former Liberal leader and Yukon Premier Pat Duncan from politics. Duncan, a three term incumbent, had held the seat since 1996. Inverarity served as an Official Opposition critic for Justice, Highways & Public Works, Economic Development, and Workers' Compensation Board portfolios. He was also a member of the Public Accounts Committee and Human Rights Act Review.

During his time as MLA, Inverarity pushed successfully for the Yukon Government to update the Yukon Driver's License, due to concerns that the licenses were not considered an acceptable form of identification in other jurisdictions and were prone to forgery.

Inverarity announced his intention to seek re-election in the 2011 election, but he was narrowly defeated by Mike Nixon of the Yukon Party. In that election, the Yukon Liberals lost their Official Opposition status and were reduced to a third party.

== Personal life ==
Originally from Calgary, Alberta Inverarity first moved to Whitehorse in 1974. He spent much of his career working for CP Air before joining the Yukon Government as an Informatics Coordinator. He later co-owned and managed a Radio Shack in Whitehorse. He has served as a board member for the Tourism Industry Association of Yukon, the Workers Compensation Board of Appeal, and the Whitehorse Chamber of Commerce.

He is married with two children.

== Electoral record ==
=== 2011 general election ===
Porter Creek South
Party	Candidate	Votes	%	±%
Yukon Party	Mike Nixon	257	42.9%	+0.3%
Liberal	Don Inverarity	243	40.6%	-2.8%
NDP	John Carney	99	16.5%	+2.6%
Total		599	100.0%	–

=== 2006 general election ===
Porter Creek South
Party	Candidate	Votes	%	±%
Liberal	Don Inverarity	304	43.4%	-8.3%
Yukon Party	Dean Hassard	298	42.6%	+4.5%
NDP	Samson Hartland	97	13.9%	+3.8%
Total		700	100.0%	–
