= Copperbelt (electoral district) =

Former territorial electoral district in the Yukon, Canada

Yukon electoral district
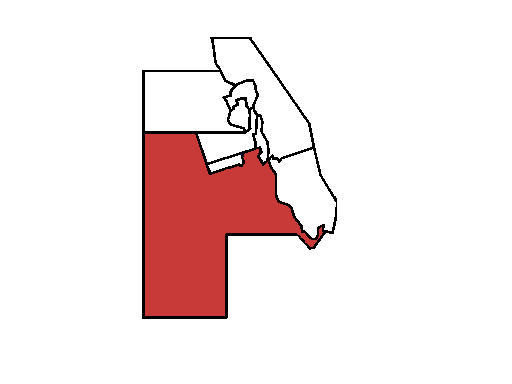
- Copperbelt in relation to other electoral districts in Whitehorse (c. 2006)
- Coordinates: 60.704, -135.105

Defunct territorial electoral district
- Legislature: Yukon Legislative Assembly
- First contested: 2002
- Last contested: 2006

Demographics
- Electors (2006): 1,748
- Census subdivision(s): Copper Ridge, Granger, Hillcrest, Lobird, MacRae, Pineridge

Copperbelt was an electoral district which returned a member to the Legislative Assembly of Yukon, Canada. It included the Whitehorse subdivisions of Hillcrest, Granger, Pineridge, MacRae, and part of Copper Ridge. It also included the Lobird mobile home park.

The riding was divided into the new ridings of Copperbelt South, Copperbelt North, Mountainview, and Takhini-Kopper King in 2009. The substantial amount of new housing development in the riding since its creation had led to a significant increase in population that had imbalanced the riding's size compared to others in the territory.

Copperbelt is the former seat of Yukon Liberal Party leader Arthur Mitchell, who was Yukon's Leader of the Official Opposition from 2005 to 2011.

== Members of the Legislative Assembly ==
Legislature	Years	Member	Party
31st	2002–2004	Haakon Arntzen	Yukon Party
31st	2004–2005	Haakon Arntzen	Independent
31st	2005–2006	Arthur Mitchell	Yukon Liberal Party
32nd	2006–2011	Arthur Mitchell	Yukon Liberal Party

== Election results ==
=== 2006 ===
2006 Yukon general election
Party	Candidate	Votes	%	±%
Liberal	Arthur Mitchell	632	52.5%	+3.0%
Yukon Party	Russ Hobbis	374	31.1%	+11.6%
NDP	David Hedmann	191	15.9%	-14.8%
Total		1204	100.0%	–

=== 2005 by-election ===
By-election: November 21, 2005
Party	Candidate	Votes	%	±%
Liberal	Arthur Mitchell	459	49.5%	+16.9%
NDP	Maureen Stephens	285	30.7%	+3.2%
Yukon Party	Cynthia Kearns	181	19.5%	-19.6%
Total		927	100.0%	–

- On the resignation of Haakon Arntzen (September 2005).

=== 2002 ===
2002 Yukon general election
Party	Candidate	Votes	%	±%
Yukon Party	Haakon Arntzen	374	39.1%	–
Liberal	Arthur Mitchell	312	32.6%	–
NDP	Lillian Grubach-Hambrook	263	27.5%	–
Total		957	100.0%	–

== See also ==
- List of Yukon territorial electoral districts
- Canadian provincial electoral districts
