= Dale Eftoda =

Canadian politician (born 1949)

MLA for Riverdale North
- In office 2000–2002
- Preceded by: Doug Phillips
- Succeeded by: Ted Staffen

Personal details
- Born: 1949 (age 76–77)
- Party: Liberal

Dale Eftoda is a Canadian politician, who represented the electoral district of Riverdale North in the Yukon Legislative Assembly from 2000 to 2002. He was a member of the Yukon Liberal Party caucus.

Eftoda became the first openly gay member of the Yukon legislature when he introduced his partner in the assembly on November 29, 2001. Prior to his election to the legislature, he was executive director of the AIDS Yukon Alliance, an HIV/AIDS education and service agency in Whitehorse.

He was defeated by Ted Staffen of the Yukon Party in the 2002 territorial election, in which every incumbent Liberal MLA except party leader Pat Duncan lost their seats.
