= Glenn Hart =

Canadian politician

MLA for Riverdale South
- In office November 4, 2002 – October 11, 2011
- Preceded by: Sue Edelman
- Succeeded by: Jan Stick

Minister of Health and Social Services
- In office July 3, 2008 – November 5, 2011
- Premier: Dennis Fentie; Darrell Pasloski
- Preceded by: Brad Cathers
- Succeeded by: Doug Graham

Minister of the Public Service Commission
- In office November 30, 2006 – July 3, 2008
- Premier: Dennis Fentie
- Preceded by: Elaine Taylor
- Succeeded by: Patrick Rouble

Minister of Community Services
- In office November 30, 2002 – July 3, 2008
- Premier: Dennis Fentie
- Preceded by: Pam Buckway
- Succeeded by: Archie Lang

Minister of Highways and Public Works
- In office November 30, 2002 – October 28, 2006
- Premier: Dennis Fentie
- Preceded by: Pam Buckway
- Succeeded by: Archie Lang

Personal details
- Party: Yukon Party
- Occupation: Civil servant; politician

Glenn Hart is a Canadian politician, who represented the Whitehorse, Yukon electoral district of Riverdale South in the Yukon Legislative Assembly from 2002 to 2011. He is a member of the Yukon Party.

== Political career ==
Hart was elected in Riverdale South in the snap Yukon election of November 2002. He defeated incumbent Yukon Liberal Cabinet minister Sue Edelman, who had held the riding since 1996.

He was appointed to the Cabinet of Yukon Premier Dennis Fentie on November 30, 2002, as the Minister of Community Services, the Minister of Highways and Public Works, and the Minister in charge of the Yukon Housing Corporation.

Hart was re-elected as MLA for Riverdale South in the 2006 Yukon election and re-appointed to Cabinet as Minister of Community Services, Minister of the Public Service Commission, and the Minister responsible for the French Language Services Directorate. He served in that capacity until July 3, 2008, when he was appointed the Minister of Health and Social Services and the Minister responsible for the Yukon Workers' Compensation Health and Safety Board. He retained responsibility for the French Language Services Directorate.

Hart was defeated in his second re-election attempt of 2011, losing to New Democrat Jan Stick, a former Whitehorse City Councillor.

== Personal life ==
Hart, a former civil servant, is married with three sons. He was active in the establishment of Whitehorse's Meadow Lakes Golf and Country Club, an investment he was required to remain distant from while serving as a minister, in order to avoid the appearance of conflict of interest.

Hart has lived in the Yukon since 1979.

== Electoral record ==
=== Yukon general election, 2011 ===
Riverdale South
Party	Candidate	Votes	%	±%
NDP	Jan Stick	380	39.2%	+18.7%
Yukon Party	Glenn Hart	314	32.4%	-11.9%
Liberal	Dan Curtis	275	28.3%	-9.5%
Total		969	100.0%	–

=== Yukon general election, 2006 ===
Riverdale South
Party	Candidate	Votes	%	±%
Yukon Party	Glenn Hart	357	41.6%	+1.9%
Liberal	Phil Treusch	324	37.8%	+3.6%
NDP	Peter Lesniak	176	20.5%	-5.6%
Total		857	100.0%	–

=== Yukon general election, 2002 ===
Riverdale South
Party	Candidate	Votes	%	±%
Yukon Party	Glenn Hart	385	39.7%	+16.0%
Liberal	Sue Edelman	332	34.2%	-14.7%
NDP	Cary Gryba	253	26.1%	-1.3%
Total		970	100.0%	–
