= Tracy-Anne McPhee =

Canadian politician

The Honourable Tracy-Anne McPhee

Government House Leader Minister of Justice Minister of Education Deputy Premier
- In office December 3, 2016 – January 14, 2023
- Premier: Sandy Silver
- Preceded by: Darius Elias; Brad Cathers; Doug Graham
- Succeeded by: Jeanie McLean

Member of the Yukon Legislative Assembly for Riverdale South
- In office November 7, 2016 – October 3, 2025
- Preceded by: Jan Stick
- Succeeded by: Justin Ziegler

Personal details
- Party: Yukon Liberal Party

Tracy-Anne McPhee is a Canadian politician, who was elected to the Legislative Assembly of Yukon in the 2016 election. She represented the electoral district of Riverdale South as a member of the Yukon Liberal Party until 2025.

She served as the Minister of Health and Social Services and the Minister of Justice in the Yukon.

== Personal life ==
Prior to entering territorial politics, McPhee worked in law for more than two decades as a practitioner, educator, and consultant, focusing on administrative law, labour law, criminal and regulatory prosecutions, and child protection cases. In 2002, she became the first female President of the Yukon Law Society, a position she held for four terms before becoming the President of the Canadian Federation of Law Societies. She is a recipient of the Canadian Bar Association Award for outstanding service to the association.

McPhee was appointed Yukon Ombudsman and Information and Privacy Commissioner from 2007 to 2012. She also served as the Executive Director of the Kwanlin Dun Cultural Centre in Whitehorse.

She holds a Bachelor of Arts from Dalhousie University (1983), a Bachelor of Education from Saint Mary's University (1984), and an L.L.B. from Dalhousie University Law School (1990). She was admitted to the Law Society of Upper Canada and the Law Society of Yukon in 1992.

== Political career ==
McPhee was elected as MLA for Riverdale South on November 7, 2016 as part of the Liberal majority government of Sandy Silver. She defeated popular former city councillor and incumbent New Democrat Jan Stick by just 37 votes.

On December 3, 2016, McPhee was appointed Minister of Justice and Minister of Education. She is also the Government House Leader and a member of the Members' Services Board.

McPhee was reelected in the 2021 Yukon general election

On May 3, 2021, McPhee was named Deputy Premier of the Yukon.

On October 27, 2021, all 11 opposition MLAs from the Yukon Party and New Democrats filed a motion calling for the resignation of McPhee as MLA over her handling of a 2019 sexual assault case at a Whitehorse elementary school when she was education minister. However, all 7 Liberal MLAs present voted against the motion and to keep McPhee as MLA, and Premier Silver expressed support for her. Because of this, YP leader Currie Dixon has said he could consider a motion of no confidence against Silver.

She did not run in the 2025 Yukon general election.

== Electoral record ==
2021 Yukon general election: Riverdale South
Party	Candidate	Votes	%	±%
Liberal	Tracy-Anne McPhee	415	39.29	+2.1%
New Democratic	Jason Cook	334	31.62	-2.4%
Yukon Party	Cynthia Lyslo	307	29.07	+0.5%
Total valid votes		1,056		
Total rejected ballots				
Turnout				
Eligible voters				
Liberal hold		Swing		+1.28
Source(s) "Unofficial Election Results 2021". Elections Yukon.

=== 2016 general election ===
Riverdale South
Party	Candidate	Votes	%	±%
Liberal	Tracy McPhee	421	37.2%	+8.9%
NDP	Jan Stick	384	34.0%	-5.2%
Yukon Party	Danny Macdonald	323	28.6%	-3.8%
Total		1128	100.0%	–
