= Arthur Mitchell (Yukon politician) =

Canadian politician

Leader of Official Opposition of Yukon
- In office May 1, 2006 – October 11, 2011
- Preceded by: Todd Hardy
- Succeeded by: Elizabeth Hanson

Leader of the Yukon Liberal Party
- In office June 2005 – October 2011
- Preceded by: Pat Duncan
- Succeeded by: Darius Elias (interim)

Member of the Yukon Legislative Assembly for Copperbelt
- In office November 21, 2005 – October 11, 2011
- Preceded by: Haakon Arntzen
- Succeeded by: riding dissolved

Personal details
- Born: July 31, 1950 (age 76) New Rochelle, New York
- Party: Liberal

Arthur Mitchell is a Canadian politician, who was a member of the Legislative Assembly of Yukon and the Leader of the Official Opposition from 2006 to 2011. He is a former real estate agent and an assistant to John Ostashek, the Yukon Party Government Leader (Premier) from 1992 to 1996. Mitchell was elected leader in June 2005 in a leadership race against Pat Duncan, the Yukon's first Liberal premier, and remained leader until his defeat in the 2011 Yukon election.

== Personal life ==
Mitchell is originally from the community of New Rochelle, New York. He is the brother of television journalist Andrea Mitchell who was married to Alan Greenspan. He is son of Cecile and Sydney Mitchell. Mitchell's father was the chief executive officer and partial owner of a furniture manufacturing company in Manhattan and was also the president of Beth El Synagogue in New Rochelle for 40 years. His mother was an administrator at the New York Institute of Technology in Manhattan. Mitchell moved to Canada in the 1970s, settling in Atlin, British Columbia to run a general store until moving to Yukon in the early 1990s and becoming a real estate agent in Whitehorse.

Mitchell has also served as alternate chair of the Yukon Worker's Compensation Health and Safety Board and on the City of Whitehorse Parks and Recreation Board.

== Political career ==
Mitchell ran in the newly created Whitehorse riding of Copperbelt in the 2002 Yukon election, but was defeated by Yukon Party candidate Haakon Arntzen.

In the 2002 election, the Liberals were reduced from government to just a single seat, that of leader and former Yukon Premier Pat Duncan. Duncan consequently called for a confidence vote in her leadership, which Mitchell contested. He defeated Duncan by 54 votes in June 2005.

Mitchell soon after contested a by-election in the riding of Copperbelt in 2005, following the resignation of Haakon Arntzen after convictions of indecent assault. Mitchell was elected to the Yukon Legislative Assembly in the November 21, 2005 by-election.

Mitchell led his party to gaining Official Opposition status in May 2006, following the defection of two New Democrat MLAs, Gary McRobb and Eric Fairclough, to the Liberal caucus. Under Mitchell's leadership, the Liberals retained Official Opposition status later that year in the 2006 Yukon election, increasing the party's seat count by one. Mitchell served as the Yukon's Leader of the Official Opposition during the 32nd Legislative Assembly.

Mitchell announced his intention to seek re-election in the redistributed riding of Copperbelt North in the 2011 election, after his riding of Copperbelt was dissolved. However, he was defeated by Currie Dixon of the Yukon Party and announced his resignation as the head of the Yukon Liberal Party. As a result of its loss, the Yukon Liberal Party was once again reduced to third party status.

== Election results ==
=== 2011 general election ===
Copperbelt North
Party	Candidate	Votes	%	±%
Yukon Party	Currie Dixon	520	47.8%	–
Liberal	Arthur Mitchell	407	37.4%	–
NDP	Skeeter Miller-Wright	159	14.6%	–
Total		1088	100.0%	–

=== 2006 general election ===
Copperbelt
Party	Candidate	Votes	%	±%
Liberal	Arthur Mitchell	632	52.5%	+3.0%
Yukon Party	Russ Hobbis	374	31.1%	+11.6%
NDP	David Hedmann	191	15.9%	-14.8%
Total		1204	100.0%	–

=== 2005 by-election ===
Copperbelt By-election: November 21, 2005
Party	Candidate	Votes	%	±%
Liberal	Arthur Mitchell	459	49.5%	+16.9%
NDP	Maureen Stephens	285	30.7%	+3.2%
Yukon Party	Cynthia Kearns	181	19.5%	-19.6%
Total		927	100.0%	–

- On the resignation of Haakon Arntzen (September 2005).

=== 2002 general election ===
Copperbelt
Party	Candidate	Votes	%	±%
Yukon Party	Haakon Arntzen	374	39.1%	–
Liberal	Arthur Mitchell	312	32.6%	–
NDP	Lillian Grubach-Hambrook	263	27.5%	–
Total		957	100.0%	–
