= Sue Edelman =

Canadian politician

MLA for Riverdale South
- In office 1996–2002
- Preceded by: Bea Firth
- Succeeded by: Glenn Hart

Personal details
- Born: Susan Jane Cable; August 12, 1957 (age 69) Toronto, Ontario, Canada
- Party: Liberal
- Spouse: Brian Edelman

Susan Jane Edelman (née Cable; August 12, 1957) is a Canadian politician. She represented the electoral district of Riverdale South in the Yukon Legislative Assembly from 1996 to 2002. She was a member of the Yukon Liberal Party. She served as Women's Issues Minister, Health Minister and Social Services Minister.

She resigned her post in 2002 after an e-mail she had written sparked controversy. In 2008, she was a Yukon returning officer.
