= Haakon Arntzen =

Canadian politician

Member of the Yukon Legislative Assembly for Copperbelt
- In office November 4, 2002 – September 9, 2005
- Preceded by: Constituency established
- Succeeded by: Arthur Mitchell

Personal details
- Born: Norway
- Party: Yukon Party (2002-2004) Independent (2004-2005)
- Occupation: Truck Driver, Businessman

Haakon Arntzen is a Canadian politician. He represented the Whitehorse, Yukon electoral district of Copperbelt in the Yukon Legislative Assembly as a member of the Yukon Party from 2002 to 2005.

== Political career ==
First elected in the 2002 territorial election, Arntzen served as a backbench government Member of Legislative Assembly (MLA) during the first part of his term. He was elected to represent the newly created Whitehorse riding of Copperbelt on behalf of the Yukon Party, which was swept into government after defeating the Yukon Liberals of Pat Duncan.

After indecent assault charges, he left the Yukon Party caucus on April 28, 2004 to sit as an Independent.

Arntzen resigned his seat on September 9, 2005 and he was succeeded in a by-election by newly elected Liberal leader Arthur Mitchell, whom Arntzen had defeated in the riding of Copperbelt in the 2002 election. Despite Arntzen's resignation, the Yukon Party retained its majority status in the legislature.

== Indecent assault charge ==
Arntzen was criminally charged with the indecent assault of two teenage girls in the 1970s.

On May 13, 2005, Arntzen was convicted of three counts of indecent assault. The Official Opposition sought, but failed, to earn unanimous consent of the Legislative Assembly to call upon Arntzen to resign. Though Arntzen was not present for the vote, the government denied unanimity, with Yukon Premier Dennis Fentie stating that the motion was premature as Arntzen had neither been sentenced, nor stated whether or not he intended to appeal the verdict. The media also called upon Arntzen to resign - or for Fentie to support his expulsion from the Assembly. Fentie never publicly called for Arntzen to resign.

Initially handed a 15-month community sentence, Arntzen appealed his conviction - as did the Crown, which demanded a stiffer sentence. Arntzen ultimately succeeded in his appeal, and a new trial was scheduled. However, before it could proceed, the Crown stayed the charges, citing a loss of reliable evidence in the case over time. One of Arntzen's alleged victims had also filed similar charges against Arntzen in Hay River, Northwest Territories in 2007, but was unsuccessful. The judge at the time had stated that Arntzen's evidence was more reliable.

== Electoral record ==
=== Yukon general election, 2002 ===
Copperbelt
Party	Candidate	Votes	%	±%
Yukon Party	Haakon Arntzen	374	39.1%	–
Liberal	Arthur Mitchell	312	32.6%	–
NDP	Lillian Grubach-Hambrook	263	27.5%	–
Total		957	100.0%	–
