= Dennis Schneider =

Canadian politician (1942–2023)

Member of the Yukon Legislative Assembly for Whitehorse West
- In office April 17, 2000 – November 4, 2002
- Preceded by: David Sloan
- Succeeded by: Elaine Taylor

Personal details
- Born: June 10, 1942 Flin Flon, Manitoba, Canada
- Died: January 31, 2023 (aged 80) Whitehorse, Yukon, Canada
- Party: Liberal

Dennis Lars Schneider (June 10, 1942 – January 31, 2023) was a real estate agent and political figure in the Yukon, Canada. He represented Whitehorse West in the Yukon Legislative Assembly from 2000 to 2002 as a Liberal.

He was born in Flin Flon, Manitoba, the son of Frank Schneider and Elsie Larson, and was educated in Denare Beach and Flin Flon. After completing high school, Schneider worked for the Hudson Bay Mining & Smelting Company. In 1961, he joined the Royal Canadian Mounted Police and served in Saskatchewan until 1996. From 1997 to 1999, Schneider worked as a real estate agent and also drove a school bus. He served as speaker for the Yukon assembly from 2000 to 2002. He was defeated when he ran for re-election in 2002. Schneider lived in Whitehorse, and died on January 31, 2023, at the age of 80.
