= Independent Alliance Party =

Territorial political party in Canada

- Founders: Bea Firth; Alan Nordling
- Founded: June 1991
- Dissolved: 1999
- Split from: Yukon Party

The Independent Alliance Party was a political party in the Canadian territory of Yukon that split from the Yukon Party in June 1991. The two original members were Bea Firth and Alan Nordling, both former members of the Yukon Party (the successor to the Yukon Progressive Conservative Party).

Both members were elected as independents in the 1992 election, as no Independent Alliance candidates were nominated before the election; however, the alliance quickly crumbled. Nordling rejoined the Yukon Party for the 1996 election and the party lost its registration under the Elections Act 1999.
