= Yukon Green Party =

Territorial political party in Canada

Yukon Green Party Parti vert du Yukon
- Leader: vacant
- Founded: 28 February 2011
- Dissolved: 24 March 2021 (deregistered)
- Headquarters: Whitehorse, Yukon
- Ideology: Green politics
- Colours: Green
- Seats in Legislature: 0 / 19

Website
- www.yukongreenparty.ca

The Yukon Green Party (French: Parti vert du Yukon) was a territorial green political party in Yukon, Canada. It was inspired by the Green Party of Canada.

Its first leader was Kristina Calhoun, a stay-at-home mother, who has lived in Yukon since 2006. The party began at a meeting in November 2010, and was registered in February 2011.

Frank de Jong led the party as its interim leader in the 2016 general election. Its platform in that election included electoral reform, legalizing marijuana, ending public funding for Catholic schools, and introducing a carbon tax in Yukon that would be offset by monthly refund payments to Yukoners.

Frank de Jong has since moved out of Yukon. The party wanted to elect a new leader at a future annual general meeting; ultimately, the party failed to do so.

The party did not run any candidates in the 2021 Yukon general election; as a result, the party was deregisted by Elections Yukon on March 24, 2021.

== Platform ==
The party was in favour of:

- Defunding Catholic schools
- Banning wet tailings dams
- Proportional representation
- Yukon-wide public transit

== Electoral record ==
General election	Leader	# of candidates	# of elected candidates	# of votes	% of popular vote
2011	Kristina Calhoun	2 / 19	0 / 19	104	0.66%
2016	Frank De Jong	5 / 19	0 / 19	145	0.8%

== Party leaders ==
- Kristina Calhoun, 2011–2016
- Frank de Jong, 2016–2019

== See also ==
- List of political parties in Yukon
- List of Yukon general elections
- Politics of Yukon
