= Ted Staffen =

Canadian politician

Speaker of the Yukon Legislative Assembly
- In office February 27, 2003 – November 5, 2011
- Preceded by: Dennis Schneider
- Succeeded by: David Laxton

Member of the Yukon Legislative Assembly for Riverdale North
- In office November 4, 2002 – October 10, 2011
- Preceded by: Dale Eftoda
- Succeeded by: Scott Kent

Personal details
- Party: Yukon Party
- Education: Simon Fraser University

Ted Staffen is a Canadian politician, who represented the electoral district of Riverdale North in the Yukon Legislative Assembly as a member of the Yukon Party from 2002 to 2011. He served as the 9th Speaker of the Legislative Assembly from 2003 to 2011.

== Early life ==
Staffen holds a bachelor's degree in political science from Simon Fraser University, where he studied the political evolution of the Yukon.

Staffen has worked in the private sector as an entrepreneur, a natural resources consultant, and in risk capital. He also served on the Board of the Whitehorse Chamber of Commerce. Prior to entering politics, Staffen worked in the Yukon, Alaska, and the Northwest Territories. He is a former researcher for the Yukon Legislative Assembly and senior political advisor for the Yukon Government Cabinet Offices.

== Political career ==
Staffen entered territorial politics in the 2002 Yukon election, recapturing the Whitehorse riding of Riverdale North from Yukon Liberal incumbent and Cabinet minister Dale Eftoda. The Liberals had seized the Yukon Party stronghold for the first time in the 2000 election. Staffen was elected as part of a Yukon Party majority government on November 4, 2002. He was re-elected in Riverdale North in the 2006 Yukon general election.

Staffen was sworn in as the Speaker of the 31st Yukon Legislative Assembly on February 27, 2003. He was re-elected Speaker for the 32nd Assembly on November 23, 2006. As Speaker, Staffen was credited with improving some of the decorum in the legislative assembly over his tenure, as well as restoring the dormant youth legislature program.

Staffen announced his plans to retire from politics in June 2011, expressing a desire to return to the private sector.

== Personal life ==
In 2012, Staffen was appointed director of regional affairs for federal Cabinet minister Leona Aglukkaq in her capacity as minister responsible for the Canadian North and the Canadian Northern Economic Development Agency. His political position was responsible for assisting the coordination of federal and territorial political operations. His appointment was not renewed when the Conservative government (and Leona Aglukkaq) were defeated in the 2015 federal election.

Staffen has lived in the Yukon since 1969. He resides in Whitehorse with his wife Susan, with whom he has two grown children, Jess and Bailey.

== Electoral record ==
=== 2006 general election ===
Riverdale North
Party	Candidate	Votes	%	±%
Yukon Party	Ted Staffen	429	44.0%	+0.5%
Liberal	Lesley Cabott	373	38.3%	+3.6%
NDP	James McCullough	172	17.6%	-4.2%
Total		974	100.0%	–

=== 2002 general election ===
Riverdale North
Party	Candidate	Votes	%	±%
Yukon Party	Ted Staffen	446	43.5%	+23.5%
Liberal	Dale Eftoda	355	34.7%	-18.2%
NDP	Jan Slipetz	223	21.8%	-5.3%
Total		1,024	100.0%	–
