= Eric Fairclough =

Canadian politician

MLA for Mayo-Tatchun
- In office September 30, 1996 – October 11, 2011
- Preceded by: Danny Joe
- Succeeded by: Jim Tredger

Leader of Official Opposition of Yukon
- In office September 6, 2000 – 2002
- Preceded by: Trevor Harding
- Succeeded by: Todd Hardy

Leader of the Yukon New Democratic Party
- In office 2000–2002
- Preceded by: Trevor Harding
- Succeeded by: Todd Hardy

Minister of Renewable Resources
- In office October 19, 1996 – May 5, 2000
- Premier: Piers McDonald
- Preceded by: ?
- Succeeded by: ?

Personal details
- Born: July 6, 1962 (age 63) Whitehorse, Yukon
- Party: Yukon NDP (1996-2006); Liberal (2006-)

Eric Fairclough is a Canadian politician, who was a Cabinet minister and Leader of the Official Opposition in the Yukon Legislative Assembly. He represented the rural Yukon electoral district of Mayo-Tatchun in the Yukon Legislative Assembly from 1996 to 2011 under both the Yukon New Democratic Party and the Liberals. He is also a former Chief of the Little Salmon/Carmacks First Nation.

== Political career ==
=== 31st Legislative Assembly ===
Fairclough was elected to the incoming New Democrat government of Piers McDonald in the 1996 Yukon general election. He ran successfully in the rural New Democrat stronghold of Mayo-Tatchun, succeeding retiring New Democrat MLA Danny Joe. Before entering territorial politics, Fairclough had been Chief of the Little Salmon/Carmacks First Nation.

Fairclough served in McDonald's Cabinet from 1996-2000 as Minister of Renewable Resources, Minister responsible for the Yukon Housing Corporation, and the Minister responsible for the Yukon Liquor Corporation.

=== 30th Legislative Assembly ===
Fairclough was re-elected as a member of the New Democrats in the 2000, but that election saw his party reduced to Official Opposition status. Fairclough became interim leader of the New Democrats when Trevor Harding, the previous interim leader, decided to resign politics. Harding had succeeded New Democrat leader Piers McDonald, who had been defeated on election night. Fairclough ultimately ran for leadership of the New Democrats, but withdrew. Former Whitehorse Centre MLA Todd Hardy, who had lost his seat in the 2000 election, was elected leader in 2002.

=== 31st Legislative Assembly ===
Fairclough was elected in 2002 Yukon election, again as part of the Official Opposition. He was appointed Official Opposition critic for Health and Social Services and Public Schools. He also shared critic portfolios on Finance and First Nations relations.

However, he was later expelled in 2006 from the New Democrat caucus by leader Todd Hardy when it was discovered that he and his colleague, Kluane MLA Gary McRobb, were publicly consulting constituents about considering quitting the New Democrats for the Liberals due to Hardy's isolated decision-making and a lack of faith in his leadership. Fairclough had also insisted upon Hardy calling a leadership race, but Hardy had refused.

Fairclough and McRobb soon joined the Liberal caucus, reducing Hardy's New Democrats to third party status and elevating the Yukon Liberal Party to Official Opposition. The move prompted the New Democrats to table legislation preventing MLAs from crossing the floor without an ensuing election, but the legislation was never adopted. Fairclough served as the Liberal environment critic for the rest of the session.

=== 32nd Legislative Assembly ===
Fairclough was comfortably re-elected in his riding in the 2006 Yukon election, capturing half the vote. McRobb too was re-elected, and the Liberals retained their Official Opposition status under a Yukon Party majority government.

During the 32nd legislature, Fairclough served as opposition critic for Health and Social Services, Community Services, Education, the Public Service Commission, the Yukon Liquor Corporation, and the Yukon Housing Corporation. He also functioned as the Liberals' whip.

Fairclough announced his intention to seek re-election in his riding of Mayo-Tatchun in the 2011 Yukon election, but was defeated in his attempt by the New Democrat's Jim Tredger. Fairclough finished in third behind the New Democrats and the Yukon Party.

== Personal life ==
Fairclough was once again re-elected Chief of the Little Salmon/Carmacks First Nation after his departure from territorial politics in 2011. He served one term prior to being defeated in 2016. During his second tenure as Chief, he was a vocal critic of the territorial and federal governments' attempts to amend the Yukon Environment and Socio-Economic Assessment Act to reduce the power of Yukon First Nations under Bill S-6. Fairclough argued that the proposed changes undermined the spirit of the First Nations' final agreements.

The victorious Liberal campaigns of Yukon Premier Sandy Silver and Prime Minister Justin Trudeau ultimately committed to repealing Bill S-6 in the 2016 Yukon election and the 2015 federal election, respectively.

== Electoral record ==
=== Yukon general election, 2011 ===
Mayo-Tatchun
Party	Candidate	Votes	%	±%
NDP	Jim Tredger	282	41.7%	+24.2%
Yukon Party	Elaine Wyatt	214	31.6%	+2.3%
Liberal	Eric Fairclough	181	26.7%	-26.5%
Total		677	100.0%	–

=== Yukon general election, 2006 ===
Mayo-Tatchun
Party	Candidate	Votes	%	±%
Liberal	Eric Fairclough	301	53.2%	+22.6%
Yukon Party	Jean VanBibber	166	29.3%	+14.4%
NDP	Karen Gage	99	17.5%	-21.9%
Total		566	100.0%	–

=== Yukon general election, 2002 ===
Mayo-Tatchun
Party	Candidate	Votes	%	±%
NDP	Eric Fairclough	339	49.3%	-12.4%
Liberal	Pat Van Bibber	210	30.6%	-7.7%
Yukon Party	Jerry C. Kruse	102	14.9%	+14.9%
Independent	Dibs Williams	36	5.2%	+5.2%
Total		687	100.0%	–

=== Yukon general election, 2000 ===
Mayo-Tatchun
Party	Candidate	Votes	%	±%
NDP	Eric Fairclough	446	61.7%	-9.9%
Liberal	Wilf Tuck	277	38.3%	+38.3%
Total		723	100.0%	–

=== Yukon general election, 1996 ===
Mayo-Tatchun
Party	Candidate	Votes	%	±%
NDP	Eric Fairclough	454	71.6%	+26.6%
Yukon Party	Michael McGinnis	180	28.4%	-11.6%
Total		634	100.0%	–
