= Dennis Fentie =

Canadian politician (1950–2019)

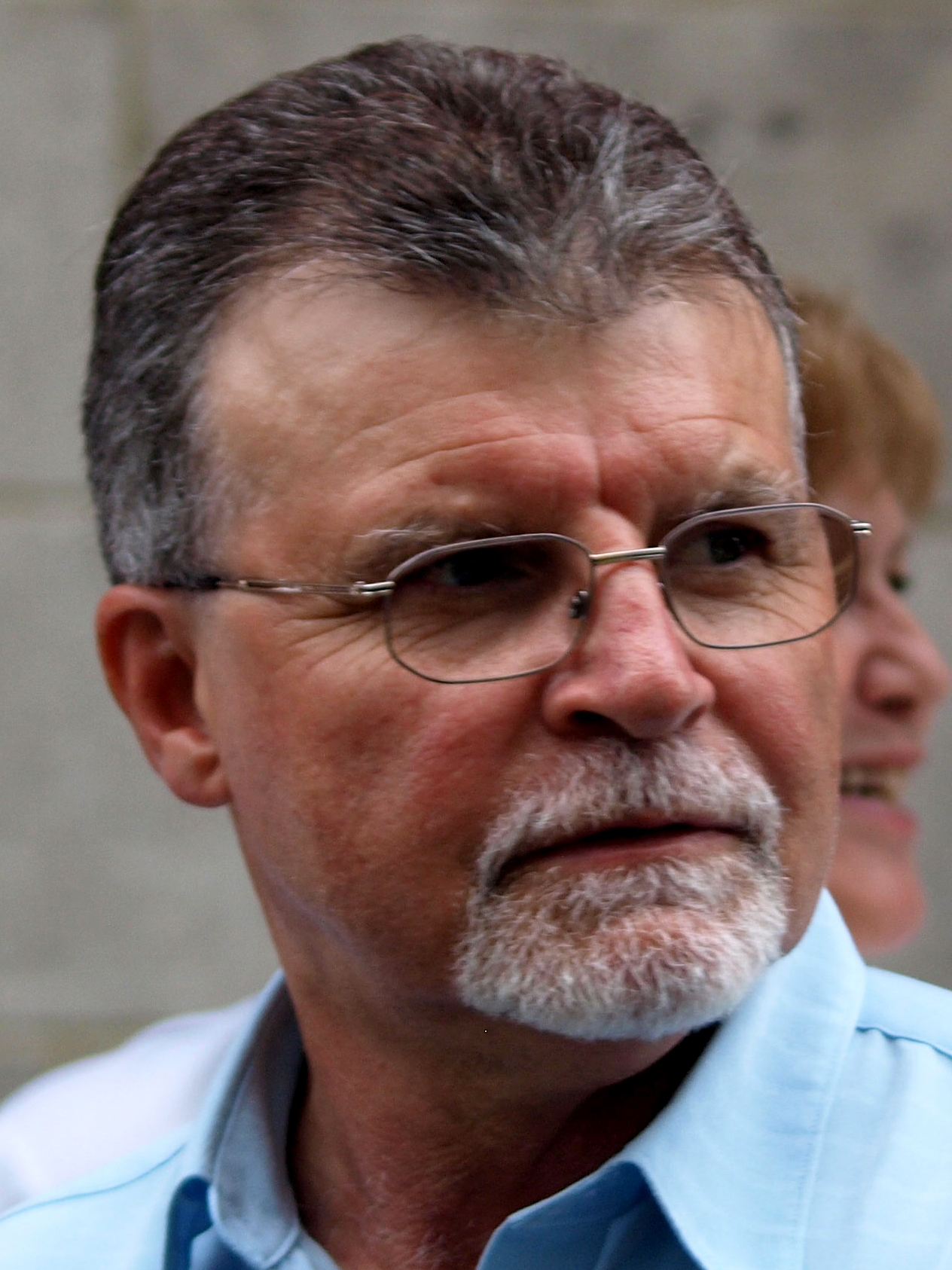
- Fentie in July 2008

7th Premier of the Yukon Minister of Finance
- In office November 30, 2002 – June 10, 2011
- Commissioner: Jack Cable; Geraldine Van Bibber; Doug Phillips
- Preceded by: Pat Duncan
- Succeeded by: Darrell Pasloski

Minister of the Environment
- In office November 28, 2005 – July 3, 2008
- Preceded by: Dennis Fentie
- Succeeded by: Elaine Taylor

MLA for Watson Lake
- In office September 30, 1996 – October 11, 2011
- Preceded by: John Devries
- Succeeded by: Patti McLeod

Leader of the Yukon Party
- In office June 15, 2002 – May 28, 2011
- Preceded by: Peter Jenkins
- Succeeded by: Darrell Pasloski

Personal details
- Born: November 8, 1950 Edmonton, Alberta, Canada
- Died: August 30, 2019 (aged 68) Whitehorse, Yukon, Canada
- Party: New Democratic (1996–2002); Yukon Party (2002–2019)
- Spouse: Lorraine Nixon

Dennis G. Fentie (November 8, 1950 – August 30, 2019) was a Canadian politician. He was the seventh premier of Yukon and leader of the Yukon Party, serving from 2002 to 2011, as well as the MLA for Watson Lake.

Before entering politics, Fentie was involved in logging, tourism, mining, trucking, and fuel distribution in and around Watson Lake. Fentie had served as director of both the Association of Yukon Forests and the Watson Lake Chamber of Commerce.

Fentie was elected twice (in 1996 and 2000) as a NDP MLA after which he joined the Yukon party, later getting elected as its leader. In the 2002 election, Fentie led the Yukon Party to a majority government. The party won 12 of 18 seats available in the Yukon Legislative Assembly. Fentie was re-elected for a fourth time in the riding of Watson Lake and the Yukon Party was voted to a second straight majority government. The Yukon Party won 12 of 18 seats in the legislative assembly. On April 27, 2011, Fentie announced he would be resigning and would not be running for re-election.

In 2003, Fentie along with two other territorial premiers opposed the Health Accord proposed by Ottawa. He maintained that the deal did not take into consideration the ground realities and cost of delivering services in the northern regions. Eventually a new funding deal was brought up as a result of which the three territories received greater funding from Ottawa. Among Fentie's major accomplishments were the establishment of the hospitals at Watson Lake and Dawson City, updates of Robert Campbell Highway and increase in the industry in Watson Lake. Fentie along with the officials and MLAs conducted the annual community tours, to visit every community and conducted public meetings with the residents to let their problems be known to the bureaucrats.

== Biography ==
Fentie was born in Edmonton, Alberta on November 8, 1950. In 1962, Fentie moved to Watson Lake. Prior to entering politics, Fentie was involved in a variety of economic activities in and around Watson Lake. These activities include logging, tourism, mining, trucking, and fuel distribution. Fentie served as director of both the Association of Yukon Forests and the Watson Lake Chamber of Commerce, and the owner and manager of Francis River Construction. He died of cancer at the age of 68 on August 30, 2019.

== Political career ==
=== NDP ===
Fentie was first elected MLA for Watson Lake in the 1996 election as a member of Yukon New Democratic Party, succeeding retiring incumbent John Devries. He was re-elected in the 2000 election as an NDP MLA.

=== Yukon Party ===
In May 2002, Fentie left the NDP, crossing the floor to sit with the Yukon Party. One month later, Fentie was selected as the next Yukon Party leader. In the 2002 election, Fentie led the Yukon Party to a majority government, defeating incumbent Premier Pat Duncan and the Liberals. The party won 12 of 18 seats available in the Yukon Legislative Assembly.

After the 2002 election, it was revealed he had been convicted and spent time in prison for heroin trafficking in 1974 when he was 24 years old. During the 2002 election campaign, he made it public that he had spent time in jail for a narcotics charge but did not make the fact it was heroin public since he had received a pardon. He had received a full pardon for the offence in 1996.

Fentie's majority government was reduced to minority government status in August 2006, when three Yukon Party MLAs resigned or chose to sit as independents. Copperbelt MLA Haakon Arntzen resigned after facing sexual assault charges and Klondike MLA Peter Jenkins was ousted after refusing to repay a government loan.

With a minority government, Fentie called the 2006 election for October 10. Fentie was re-elected for a fourth time in the riding of Watson Lake and the Yukon Party was voted to a second straight majority government. The Yukon Party under Fentie's leadership won 12 of 18 seats in the legislative assembly.

In early 2011, he was featured in an episode of CBC Television's Make the Politician Work.

On April 27, 2011, Fentie announced he would be resigning and would not be running for re-election.

=== Social Initiatives ===
According to senator Pat Duncan who was defeated by Fentie's Yukon Party in 2002, "He was a tireless champion of Watson Lake and Southeast Yukon, especially the forestry and mining industry in the Legislature in Piers McDonald's government. His strong advocacy for the Yukon continued in Opposition with the Yukon Party and as premier."

Yukon MP Larry Bagnell stated that Fentie took stands on certain issues independent of the party politics. Serving as the Yukon Party premier, Fentie pursued several leftist socially progressive initiatives, while as an NDP member he had pursued rightist initiatives.

In 2003, Fentie along with two other territorial premiers refused to agree to the Health Accord proposed by Ottawa meant for the rest of Canada. The three opposing premiers maintained that the deal did not take into consideration the ground realities and cost of delivery in the northern regions. Fentie had stated that, "An ambulance ride in Ottawa is a plane ride in the territories." Eventually a new funding deal was brought up and agreed upon as a result of which the three territories received greater funding from Ottawa.

According to the Yukon Party Leader Stacey Hassard, "He was a down-to-earth, truck-driving type guy." Fentie worked to ensure that problems faced by Yukoners are known to the bureaucrats. Fentie insisted that the officials were available for annual tours where Fentie and MLAs would visit every community. Public meetings with the residents were also organised.

Hassard stated that the hospitals at Watson Lake and Dawson City were credited to efforts by Fentie. While noting down few of Fentie's accomplishments, Watson Lake Mayor Cheryl O'Brien credited Fentie, with the establishment of the hospital, updates to Robert Campbell Highway and increase in the industry in Watson Lake.

== Electoral record ==
=== Yukon general election, 2006 ===
Watson Lake
Party	Candidate	Votes	%	±%
Yukon Party	Dennis Fentie	495	64.7%	+1.6%
Liberal	Rick Harder	196	25.6%	+4.4%
NDP	Rachael Lewis	45	5.8%	-10.0%
Independent	Dale Robert Worsfold	28	3.6%	+3.6%
Total		764	100.0%	–

=== Yukon general election, 2002 ===
Watson Lake
Party	Candidate	Votes	%	±%
Yukon Party	Dennis Fentie	521	63.1%	+46.2%
Liberal	Tom Cove	174	21.1%	-10.9%
NDP	Kathy Magun	130	15.8%	-35.3%
Total		825	100.0%	–

=== Yukon general election, 2000 ===
Watson Lake
Party	Candidate	Votes	%	±%
NDP	Dennis Fentie	434	51.1%	-1.7%
Liberal	Isaac Wood	272	32.0%	+19.3%
Yukon Party	Mickey Thomas	144	16.9%	-12.8%
Total		850	100.0%	–

=== Yukon general election, 1996 ===
Watson Lake
Party	Candidate	Votes	%	±%
NDP	Dennis Fentie	442	52.8%	+18.3%
Yukon Party	Barrie Ravenhill	249	29.7%	-29.0%
Liberal	Dave Kalles	106	12.7%	+5.9%
Independent	Mickey Thomas	40	4.8%	+4.8%
Total		837	100.0%	–
