= Pat Duncan =

Canadian politician

The Honourable Pat Duncan
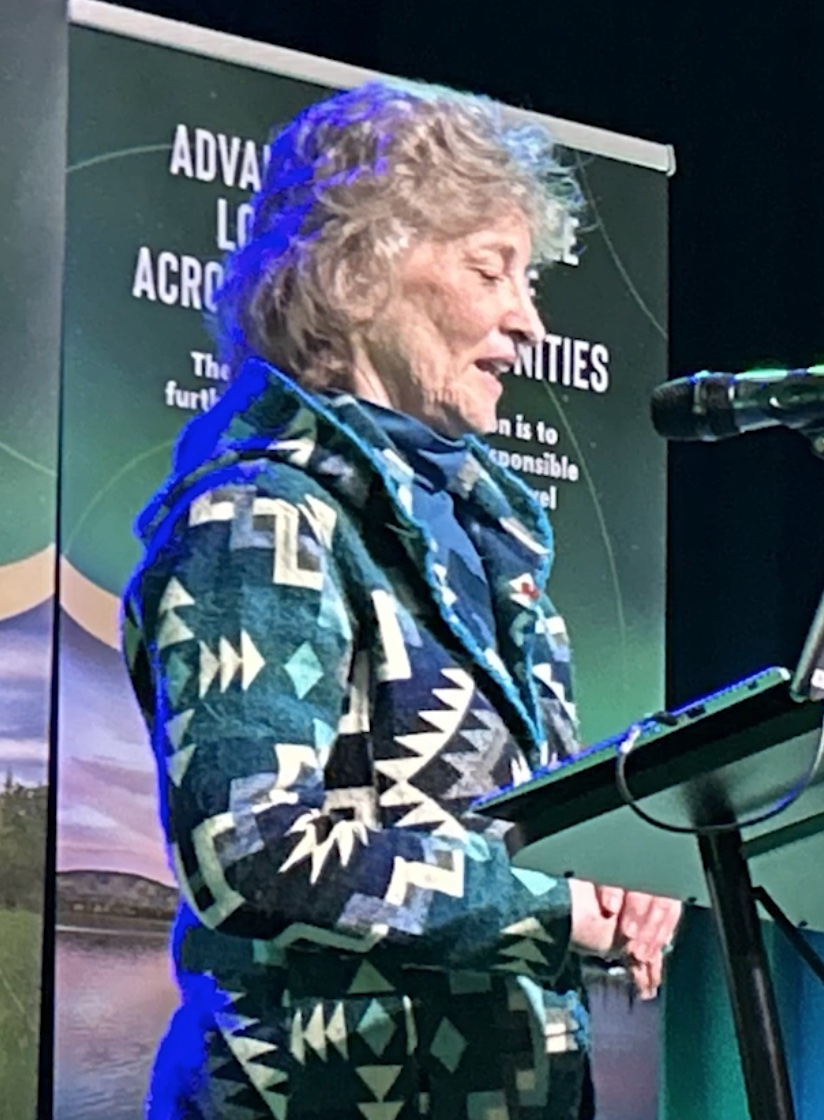
- Duncan in 2025

Canadian Senator from Yukon
- Incumbent
- Assumed office December 12, 2018
- Nominated by: Justin Trudeau
- Appointed by: Julie Payette
- Preceded by: Daniel Lang

6th Premier of Yukon
- In office May 6, 2000 – November 30, 2002
- Commissioner: Judy Gingell; Jack Cable
- Preceded by: Piers McDonald
- Succeeded by: Dennis Fentie

Leader of Official Opposition of Yukon
- In office 1999–2000
- Preceded by: John Ostashek
- Succeeded by: Trevor Harding

MLA for Porter Creek South
- In office September 30, 1996 – October 10, 2006
- Preceded by: Alan Nordling
- Succeeded by: Don Inverarity

Personal details
- Born: April 8, 1960 (age 66) Edmonton, Alberta, Canada
- Party: Non-aligned
- Other political affiliations: Yukon Liberal (until 2018) Independent Senators Group (2019—2025)
- Spouse: Daryl Berube

Patricia Jane Duncan (born April 8, 1960) is a Canadian politician from Yukon. Duncan served as leader of the Yukon Liberal Party from 1998 to 2005 and as the sixth premier of Yukon from 2000 until 2002. Duncan was the first Liberal premier of the Yukon and the first female premier in the Yukon, the second woman in Canadian history to win the premiership of a province or territory through a general election, the first to do so by defeating an incumbent premier, and the first to do so by defeating a male opponent.

Duncan was appointed to the Senate of Canada on December 12, 2018. In September 2025, she was appointed Deputy Government Liaison in the Senate.

== Life before politics ==
Duncan was born in Edmonton, Alberta in 1960, and moved with her family to Whitehorse, Yukon in 1964. She graduated from Carleton University with a Bachelor of Arts in political science.

== Professional background ==
Prior to entering politics, Duncan was a small business owner. She also served as executive director of the Whitehorse Chamber of Commerce. In the mid-1980s, Duncan served as a special assistant to Progressive Conservative Deputy Prime Minister Erik Nielsen. Duncan remained in this position until Nielsen's retirement in 1987.

== Yukon politics ==
Duncan was first elected to the Yukon Legislative Assembly in the 1996 general election. Duncan was elected as a Liberal to represent the Porter Creek South riding, a riding located in Whitehorse. In the 1996 general election, Piers McDonald (New Democratic Party) won a majority government. Duncan was one of three Liberals elected. Liberal leader at the time, Ken Taylor, was unsuccessful in winning his Mount Lorne riding.

In 1998, Duncan was elected leader of the Yukon Liberal Party. From 1998-2000, Duncan served as the Leader of the Official Opposition in the legislature. In the 2000 general election Duncan led the Yukon Liberal Party to a majority government, defeating New Democratic incumbent Piers McDonald. The Liberals were elected in 10 ridings and received 42.7% of the popular vote. Early in 2002, the Liberal majority was reduced to a minority after the defection of three Liberal MLAs, Mike McLarnon, Don Roberts and Wayne Jim. The catalyst for the defections was reported to be Duncan's allegedly heavy-handed and secretive leadership style.

On October 4, 2002, only two years into Duncan's five-year term, she called a general election for November 4, 2002. The rationale for the election was to achieve certainty in the legislature, however many Yukoners were angered at the quick election. The Yukon Liberals were reduced to only one seat after the election - Duncan's own riding of Porter Creek South. Yukon Party leader Dennis Fentie, a former NDP MLA, led his new party to victory. The Liberals were reduced to third party status with Duncan as the sole Liberal MLA.

At the 2005 Yukon Liberal Party leadership convention, Duncan was defeated by Arthur Mitchell by a margin of 357 votes to 303. Citing health concerns, she did not seek re-election in the 2006 general election.

== Electoral record ==
=== Yukon general election, 2002 ===
Porter Creek South
Party	Candidate	Votes	%	±%
Liberal	Pat Duncan	408	51.7%	-12.5%
Yukon Party	Lynn Ogden	301	38.1%	+13.3%
NDP	Paul Warner	80	10.1%	-0.7%
Total		789	100.0%	–

=== Yukon general election, 2000 ===
Porter Creek South
Party	Candidate	Votes	%	±%
Liberal	Pat Duncan	607	64.2%	+21.3%
Yukon Party	Larry Carlyle	235	24.8%	-14.3%
NDP	Mark Dupuis	103	10.8%	-7.0%
Total		945	100.0%	–

=== Yukon general election, 1996 ===
Porter Creek South
Party	Candidate	Votes	%	±%
Liberal	Pat Duncan	435	42.9%	+15.0%
Yukon Party	Alan Nordling	397	39.1%	+39.1%
NDP	Mark Dupuis	181	17.8%	-7.8%
Total		1013	100.0%	–
