= Riverdale, Whitehorse =

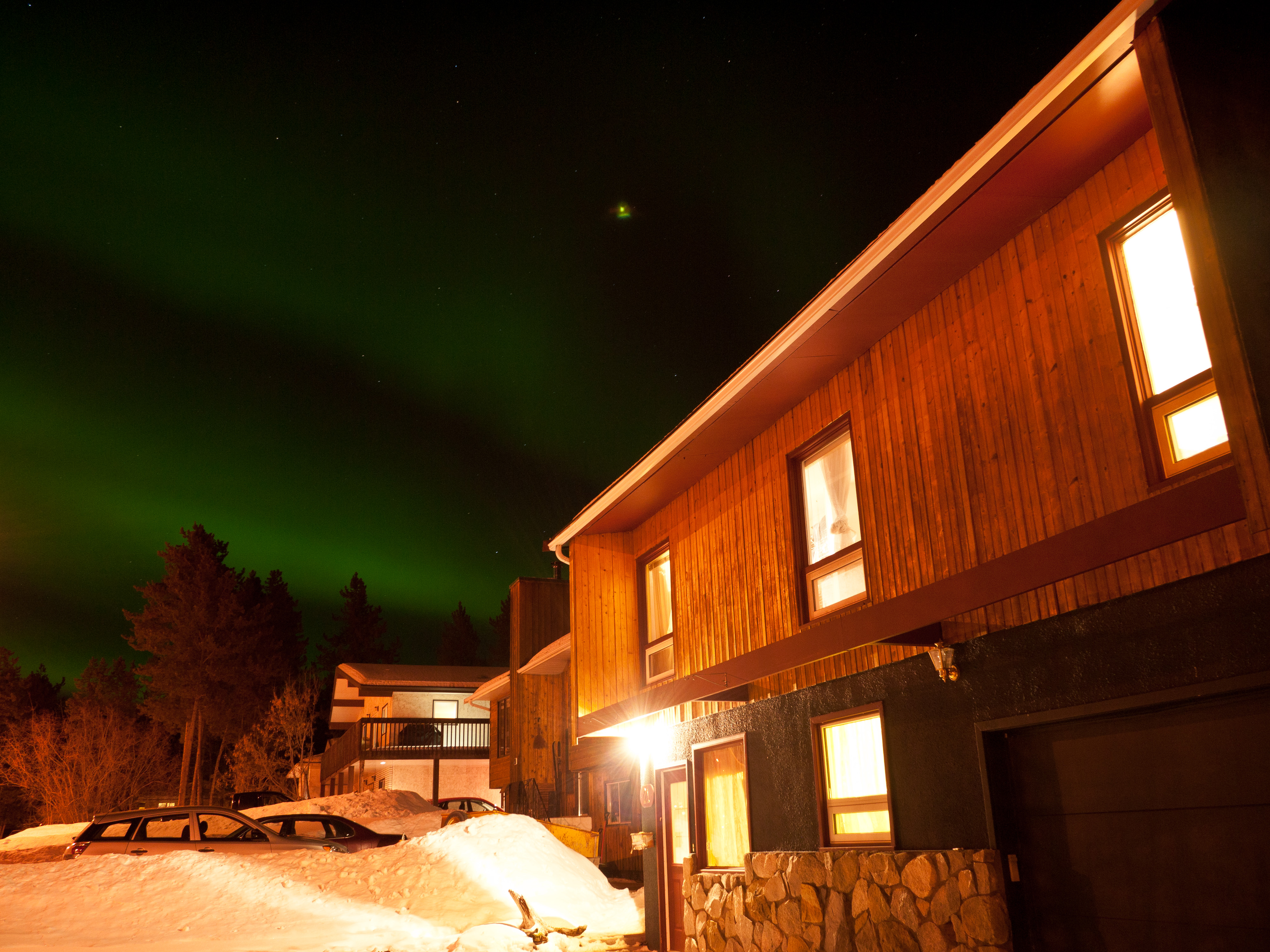
An aurora over a residential neighbourhood of Riverdale. Riverdale is located on the east bank of the Yukon River.

Riverdale is a neighbourhood within the city of Whitehorse, Yukon, Canada. The community is separated from Whitehorse City Centre by the Yukon River, and is linked to Whitehorse via Lewes Boulevard, a major thoroughfare in the community.

The neighbourhood is home to the western end of the Grey Mountain and Viewpoint. Riverdale also has numerous low-rise apartments along Lewes Boulevard, which is relatively rare in Northern Canada.

The neighbourhood is served by the electoral districts of Riverdale North and Riverdale South in the Yukon Legislative Assembly.

Riverdale is distinctive in Whitehorse because it is encircled by large mountains on three sides, with the Yukon River forming the fourth side.

Climate data for Whitehorse (Riverdale) Climate ID: 2101400; coordinates 60°42′36″N 135°01′38″W; elevation: 640.1 m (2,100 ft); 1981–2010 normals, extremes 1959–present
Month	Jan	Feb	Mar	Apr	May	Jun	Jul	Aug	Sep	Oct	Nov	Dec	Year
Record high °C (°F)	10.0 (50.0)	12.8 (55.0)	13.5 (56.3)	23.5 (74.3)	34.5 (94.1)	35.6 (96.1)	34.5 (94.1)	31.7 (89.1)	26.7 (80.1)	20.0 (68.0)	12.2 (54.0)	9.5 (49.1)	35.6 (96.1)
Mean daily maximum °C (°F)	−12.1 (10.2)	−6.6 (20.1)	0.3 (32.5)	8.5 (47.3)	15.3 (59.5)	20.4 (68.7)	21.6 (70.9)	19.5 (67.1)	12.8 (55.0)	4.3 (39.7)	−6.2 (20.8)	−9.1 (15.6)	5.7 (42.3)
Daily mean °C (°F)	−16.2 (2.8)	−11.8 (10.8)	−6 (21)	1.8 (35.2)	8.0 (46.4)	13.1 (55.6)	15.1 (59.2)	13.1 (55.6)	7.5 (45.5)	0.5 (32.9)	−9.8 (14.4)	−13.2 (8.2)	0.2 (32.4)
Mean daily minimum °C (°F)	−20.4 (−4.7)	−17.0 (1.4)	−12.3 (9.9)	−4.9 (23.2)	0.7 (33.3)	5.9 (42.6)	8.5 (47.3)	6.6 (43.9)	2.1 (35.8)	−3.4 (25.9)	−13.4 (7.9)	−17.3 (0.9)	−5.4 (22.3)
Record low °C (°F)	−48.3 (−54.9)	−51.1 (−60.0)	−42.8 (−45.0)	−31.7 (−25.1)	−15.0 (5.0)	−4.4 (24.1)	−1.7 (28.9)	−5.6 (21.9)	−17.5 (0.5)	−29.5 (−21.1)	−41.7 (−43.1)	−47.8 (−54.0)	−51.1 (−60.0)
Average precipitation mm (inches)	19.2 (0.76)	13.6 (0.54)	11.7 (0.46)	6.8 (0.27)	16.3 (0.64)	33.4 (1.31)	39.6 (1.56)	36.5 (1.44)	35.3 (1.39)	26.1 (1.03)	22.7 (0.89)	20.3 (0.80)	281.6 (11.09)
Average rainfall mm (inches)	0.2 (0.01)	0.1 (0.00)	0.1 (0.00)	2.2 (0.09)	15.1 (0.59)	33.4 (1.31)	39.6 (1.56)	36.2 (1.43)	29.7 (1.17)	9.9 (0.39)	0.8 (0.03)	0.1 (0.00)	167.2 (6.58)
Average snowfall cm (inches)	19.0 (7.5)	13.5 (5.3)	11.9 (4.7)	4.6 (1.8)	1.2 (0.5)	0.0 (0.0)	0.0 (0.0)	0.4 (0.2)	5.6 (2.2)	16.3 (6.4)	21.9 (8.6)	20.2 (8.0)	114.6 (45.1)
Average precipitation days (≥ 0.2 mm)	9.7	7.3	5.7	4.5	8.0	11.4	13.6	12.4	10.1	11.2	10.3	10.1	114.3
Average rainy days (≥ 0.2 mm)	0.20	0.13	0.09	1.9	7.7	11.4	13.6	12.4	9.6	5.2	0.44	0.12	62.7
Average snowy days (≥ 0.2 cm)	9.5	7.3	5.7	2.7	0.54	0.0	0.0	0.10	1.1	7.0	10.0	10.0	53.8
Source: Environment and Climate Change Canada
