= Bob Smart's Dream =

Poem by Robert W. Service

"Bob Smart's Dream" is a poem written by Robert W. Service while he lived in Whitehorse, Yukon, Canada. He presented it on March 19, 1906, at a banquet held to honour J.P. Rogers, the superintendent of the White Pass and Yukon Route. The real-life Bob Smart had been the government assayer at Whitehorse since 1903.

Imagining that "fifty years had sped," as Service wrote, Smart discovered a vastly different Whitehorse from the frontier town he knew that merely supplied transportation to and from the Klondike. It reflects a how technology and society might advance in 50 years from the point of view of someone living at the turn of the 20th century.

Smart dreamt that in 1956 there were industrial manufacturing plants ("stamp mills") and a smelter up on the ridge where the city's airport actually is located today. The Whitehorse Rapids had been dammed to power other factories, but instead, a hydroelectric project has actually been built. No smelter was ever built in the Yukon.

Smart hears the roar of a trolley and steps out of its way; in actuality, there was no public transit in Whitehorse except during World War II (for military personnel only) and then since 1976, in the form of buses.

Smart crosses the Yukon on a big steel bridge. While the Robert Campbell Bridge was originally steel, it was damaged in 1973 and replaced with a concrete structure in 1975.

Smart visits Ear Lake Park, a garden spot to relax. Ear Lake was the location of a park, and actually, there have been occasional suggestions to make it into a suitable park and to run the waterfront trolley out that far. The waterfront trolley (actually a tram that pulls its own electric generator) is all that Whitehorse actually has for trolleys.

Smart stumbled along a cement sidewalk that had replaced wood, and looked up at a skyscraper where a tent had been before. An 18-storey steel building had replaced the White Pass Hotel. In fact, cement sidewalks replaced wooden ones in the early 1960s, and the "skyscrapers" of Whitehorse are no taller than four floors; one three-storey log cabin was built in the 1940s.

Smart saw beautiful suburbs with flower gardens.

Smart saw "Taylor and Drury's colossal department store." Alas, the Taylor and Drury mercantile chain has disappeared, and the largest department store, in the traditional sense, is now a Wal-Mart store located some distance from the downtown core that Smart trod in his dream.

Smart saw "the flyer just starting for Dawson, the bullion express coming in," a reference to a fast passenger train departing for the heart of the Klondike, and a freight train bringing more gold brought up from the creeks. In fact, no railroad ever was extended past Whitehorse, and there has been no scheduled train service even as far as Whitehorse since 1982.

Much of the poem's text is now part of a mural outside the council chamber in the city hall in Whitehorse.
