= Whitehorse =

Capital and largest city of Yukon, Canada

- City and territorial capital
- City of Whitehorse
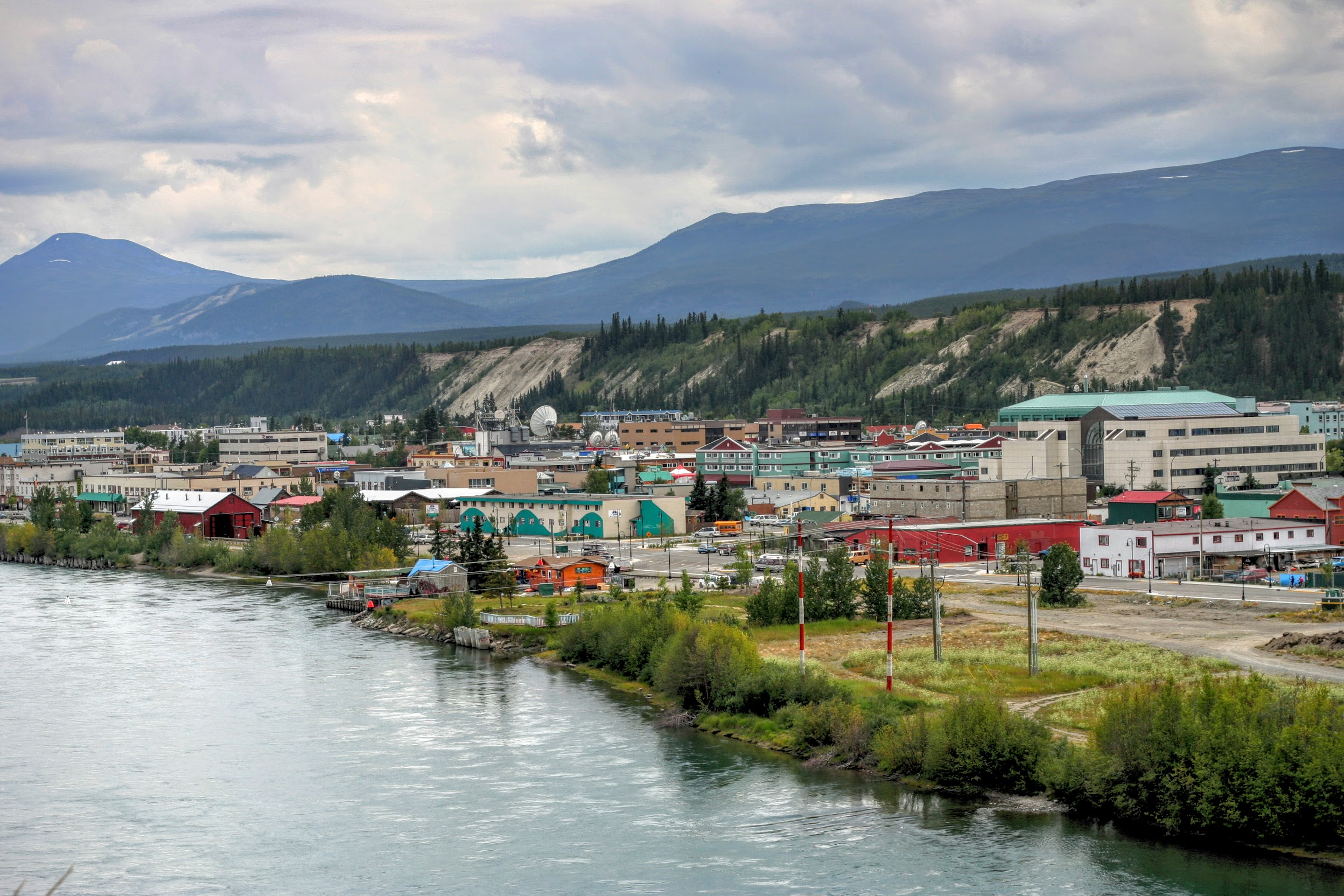
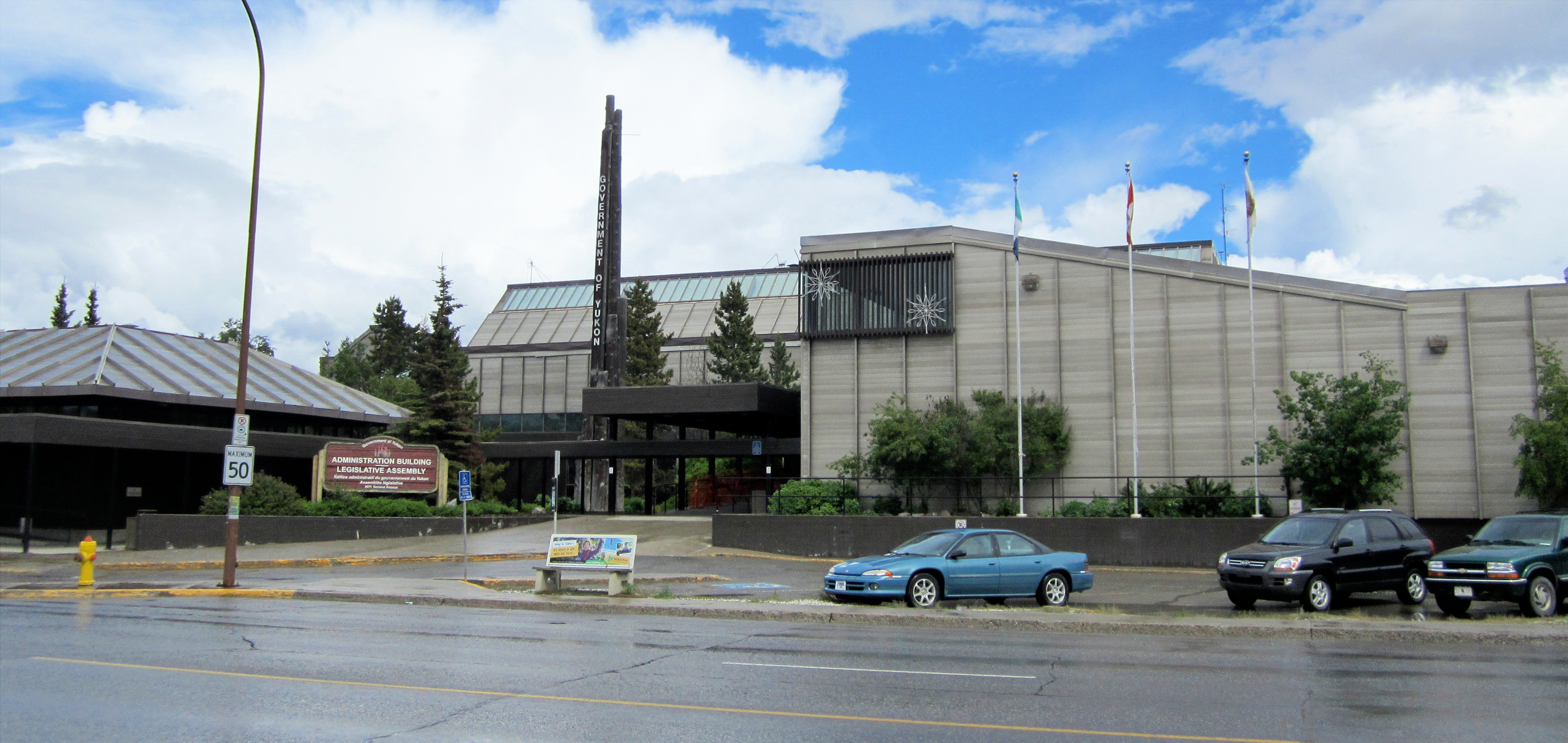
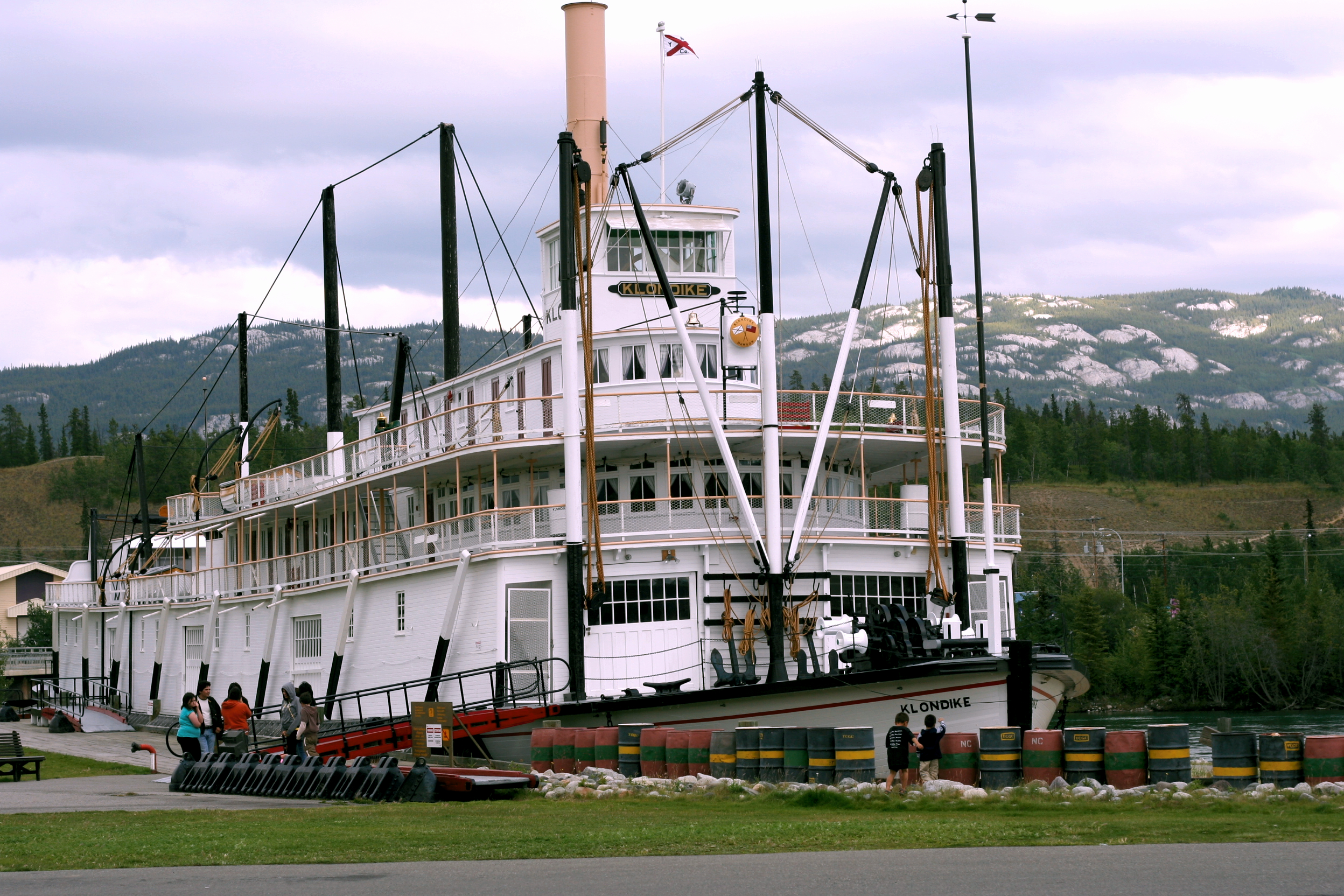
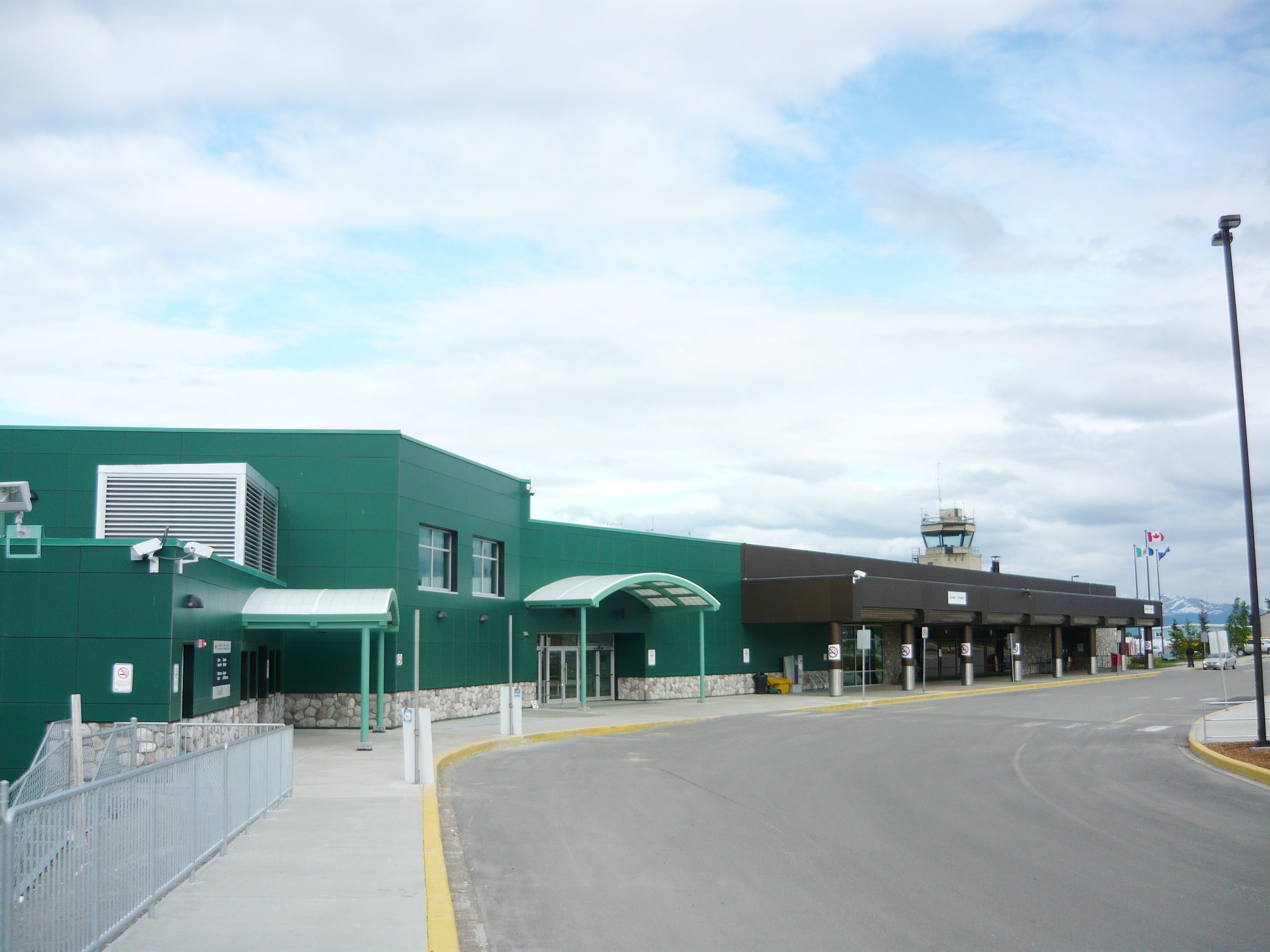
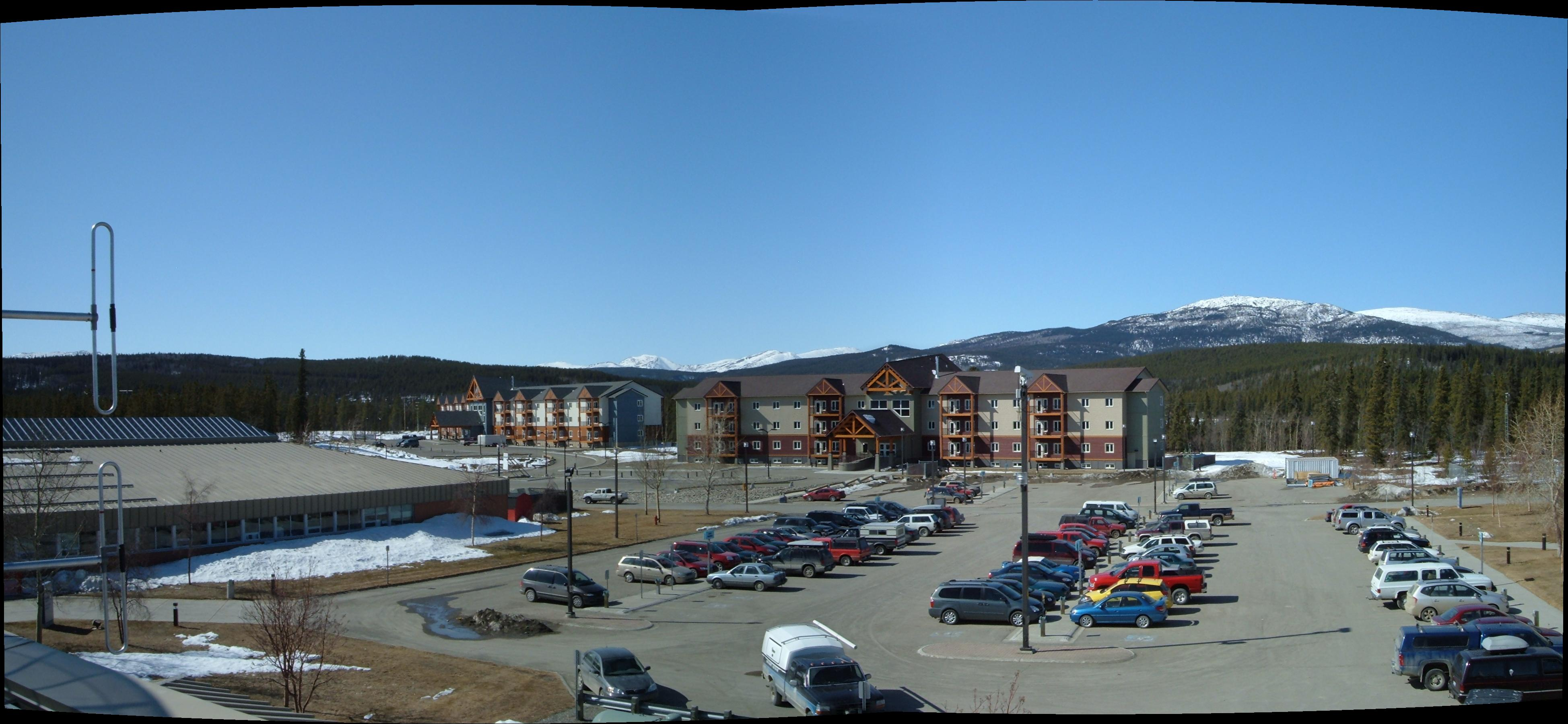
- Downtown Whitehorse and the Yukon River Yukon Legislative Building SS Klondike Erik Nielsen Whitehorse International Airport Yukon University

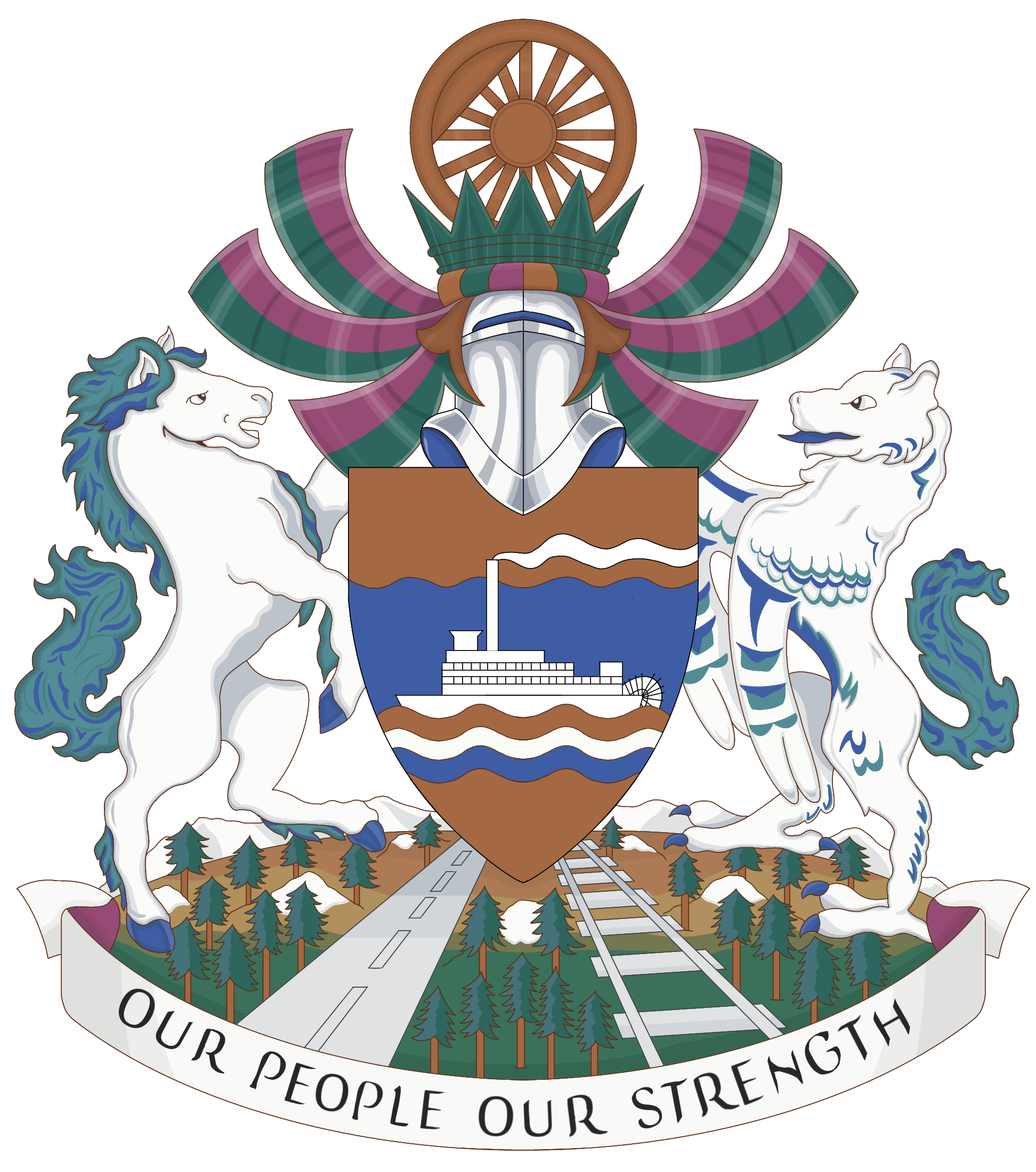
- Flag Coat of arms Logo
- Nicknames: "The Wilderness City"
- Motto: Our People, Our Strength
- Location of Whitehorse Location of Whitehorse
- Coordinates: 60°43′27″N 135°03′22″W
- Country: Canada
- Territory: Yukon
- Established: 1898

Government
  - Mayor: Kirk Cameron
  - Governing body: Whitehorse City Council
  - MPs: Brendan Hanley
  - MLAs: Kevin Mclaughlin; Yvonne Clarke; Currie Dixon; Scott Kent; Jeanie McLean; Tracy-Anne McPhee; Richard Mostyn; Ranj Pillai; Elaine Taylor; Lane Tredger; Kate White

Area
  - City and territorial capital: 413.94 km^{2} (159.82 sq mi)
  - Urban: 35.97 km^{2} (13.89 sq mi)
  - Metro: 8,465.21 km^{2} (3,268.44 sq mi)
- Elevation: 670–1,702 m (2,198–5,584 ft)

Population (2021)
  - City and territorial capital: 28,201
  - Density: 68.1/km^{2} (176/sq mi)
  - Urban: 24,513
  - Urban density: 681.5/km^{2} (1,765/sq mi)
- Demonym: Whitehorser
- Time zone: UTC−07:00 (MST)
- Forward sortation area: Y1A
- Area code: 867
- NTS Map: 105D11 Whitehorse
- Website: whitehorse.ca

Whitehorse is the capital of Yukon, and the largest city in Northern Canada. It was incorporated in 1950 and is located at kilometre 1426 (Historic Mile 918) on the Alaska Highway in southern Yukon. Whitehorse's downtown and Riverdale areas occupy both shores of the Yukon River, which rises in British Columbia and meets the Bering Sea in Alaska. The city was named after the White Horse Rapids for their resemblance to the mane of a white horse.

Because of the city's location in the Whitehorse valley and relative proximity to the Pacific Ocean, the climate tends to be milder. At this latitude, winter days are short and summer days have up to about 19 hours of daylight.

As of the 2021 Canadian census, the population was 28,201 within city boundaries and 31,913 in the census agglomeration. These figures represent approximately 70 and 79 percent, respectively, of the total population of Yukon.

== History ==
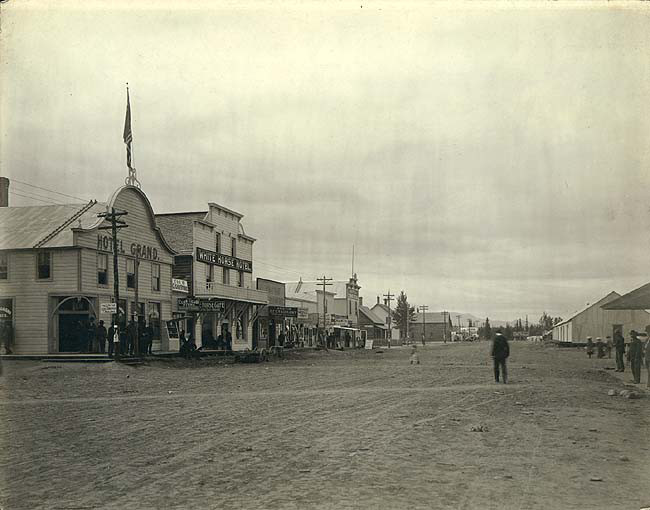
Streetscape of Whitehorse in 1900. The community saw a population boom with the discovery of gold in the Klondike in 1896.

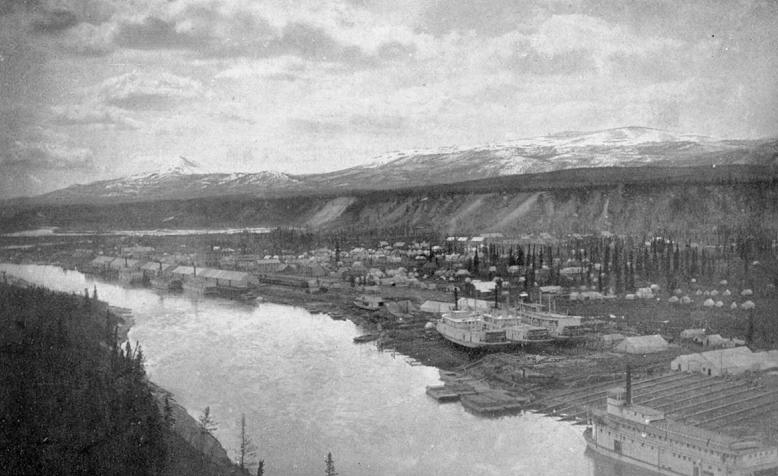
View of Whitehorse in 1910

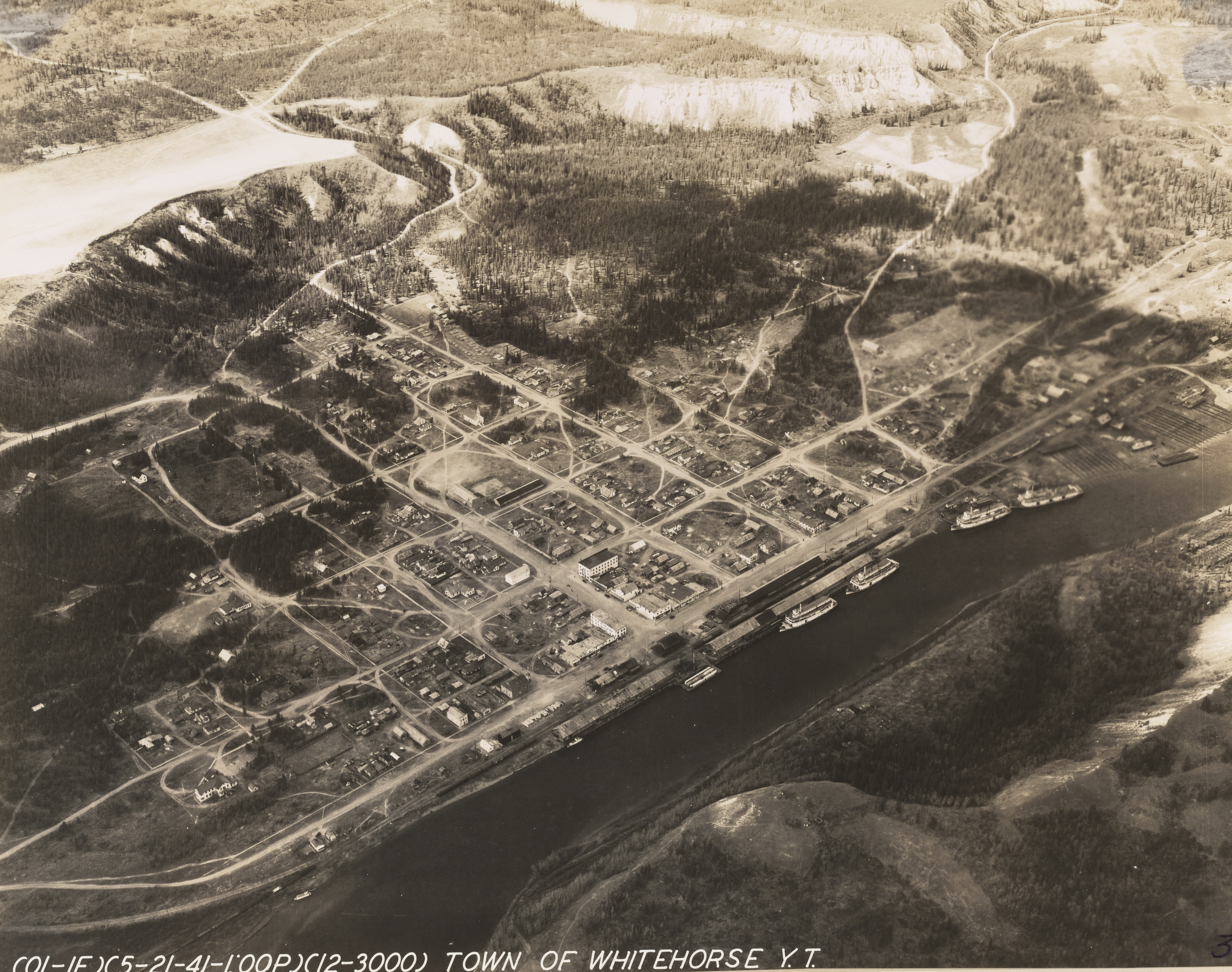
Whitehorse, 1941

Archaeological research south of the downtown area, at a location known as Canyon City, has revealed evidence of use by First Nations for several thousand years. The surrounding area had seasonal fish camps and Frederick Schwatka, in 1883, observed the presence of a portage trail used to bypass Miles Canyon. Before the Gold Rush, several different tribes passed through the area seasonally and their territories overlapped.

The discovery of gold in the Klondike in August 1896, by Skookum Jim, Tagish Charlie, and George Washington Carmack, set off a major change in the historical patterns of the region. Early prospectors used the Chilkoot Pass, but by July 1897, crowds of neophyte prospectors had arrived via steamship and were camping at "White Horse". By June 1898, there was a bottleneck of prospectors at Canyon City, and many boats had been lost to the rapids as well as five people. Samuel Steele of the North-West Mounted Police remarked: "why more casualties have not occurred is a mystery to me."

On their way to find gold, prospectors also found copper in the "copper belt" in the hills west of Whitehorse. The first copper claims were staked by Jack McIntyre on July 6, 1898, and Sam McGee on July 16, 1899. Two tram lines were built, one 8-kilometre (5.0 mi) stretch on the east bank of the Yukon River from Canyon City to the rapids, just across from the present day downtown, and the other on the west bank of the river.

The White Pass and Yukon Route narrow-gauge railway linking Skagway to Whitehorse had begun construction in May 1898. By May 1899, construction had arrived at the south end of Bennett Lake. Construction began again at the north end of Bennett lake to Whitehorse. It was only in June–July 1900 that construction finished the difficult Bennett Lake section itself, completing the entire route.

By 1901, the Whitehorse Star was already reporting on daily freight volumes. Even though traders and prospectors were all calling the city Whitehorse (White Horse), there was an attempt by the railway people to change the name to Closeleigh (British Close brothers provided funding for the railway), this was refused by William Ogilvie, the territory's Commissioner.

On May 23, 1905, a small fire in the barber shop of the Windsor Hotel got out of control when the fire engine ran out of water, spreading throughout the city and causing $300,000 (equivalent to $10 million in 2025) in damage, though there were no deaths. Robert Service was working as a bank teller at the time and participated in suppressing the flame. The White Horse Restaurant and Inn was among the buildings destroyed, after its co-founder Frederick Trump had sold his shares and left the city.

In 1920, the first planes landed in Whitehorse and the first air mail was sent in November 1927. Until 1942, rail, river, and air were the only way to get to Whitehorse, but in 1942 the US military decided an interior road would be safer to transfer troops and provisions between Alaska and the US mainland and began construction of the Alaska Highway. The entire 1,600-mile (2,600 km) project was accomplished between March and November 1942. The Canadian portion of the highway was only returned to Canadian sovereignty after the war. The Canol pipeline was also constructed to supply oil to the north with a refinery in Whitehorse.

In 1950, the city was incorporated and by 1951 the population had doubled from its 1941 numbers. On April 1, 1953, the city was designated the capital of the Yukon Territory when the seat was moved from Dawson City after the construction of the Klondike Highway. On March 21, 1957, the name was officially changed from "White Horse" to "Whitehorse".

== Geography ==
Whitehorse is located at kilometre 1,425 (Historic Mile 918) of the Alaska Highway and is framed by three nearby mountains: Grey Mountain to the east, Mount Sumanik to the northwest and Golden Horn Mountain to the south. The rapids which were the namesake of the city have disappeared under Miles Canyon and Schwatka Lake, formed by the construction of a hydroelectricity dam in 1958. Whitehorse is currently the 64th largest city in Canada by area. The city limits present a near rectangular shape orientated in a NW-SE direction.

=== Cityscape ===
Whitehorse Bylaw 426 (1975) restricts the operation of motor vehicles to designated roadways in certain "Protected Areas" to ensure maximum conservation of the environmental quality. Most are near the downtown core (downtown and Yukon river escarpments, Mt. Mac ski trails, Riverdale, Valleyview, Hillcrest, Granger, Porter Creek, and Mountainview) and one, Pineridge, is south of downtown.

In 1999, the city approved the Area Development Scheme (ADS) which reallocated the area previously known as "Whitehorse Copper" to the following uses: Country Residential, Commercial, Service Industrial, and Heavy industrial.

Recent demands for growth have reignited urban planning debates in Whitehorse. In 1970 the Metropolitan Whitehorse development plan included park and greenbelt areas that were to be preserved to ensure high quality of life even within city limits.

=== Climate ===
Whitehorse has a subarctic climate (Köppen climate classification: Dfc, Trewartha Eclc) and lies in the rain shadow of the Coast Mountains, causing precipitation totals to be quite low year-round. Due to the city's location in the Whitehorse valley, the climate is milder than other comparable northern communities such as Yellowknife; however, during cold snaps it is not uncommon for temperatures to drop below −40 °C (−40 °F). With an average annual temperature of 0.2 °C (32.4 °F) Whitehorse is the warmest place in the Yukon. The temperature measurements for the city are taken at the airport. The Whitehorse Riverdale weather station situated at a lower elevation than the airport is also 0.2 °C (32.4 °F).

At this latitude winter days are short and summer days have just over 19 hours of daylight. Whitehorse has an average daily high of 20.6 °C (69.1 °F) in July and average daily low of −19.2 °C (−2.6 °F) in January. The highest temperature ever recorded in Whitehorse was 35.6 °C (96.1 °F) on 14 June 1969. The coldest temperature ever recorded was −56.2 °C (−69.2 °F) on 21 January 1906.

Whitehorse has little precipitation, with an average annual snowfall of 141.8 cm (55.8 in) and 160.9 mm (6.33 in) of rainfall. According to the Meteorological Service of Canada, Whitehorse has the distinction of being Canada's driest city. Whitehorse is in the Cordilleran climate region, the Complex Soils of Mountain Areas soil region, the Cordilleran vegetation region, and the Boreal Cordillera ecozone.

Climate data for Whitehorse (Erik Nielsen Whitehorse International Airport) WMO ID: 71964; coordinates 60°42′34″N 135°04′07″W; elevation: 706.2 m (2,317 ft); 1991–2020 normals, extremes 1900–present (Note: Climate data was recorded in the area of downtown Whitehorse from July 1900 to March 1942 and at Whitehorse Airport from April 1942 to present.) (Note: Composite station data: Whitehorse Auto - Climate ID: 2101310, WMO ID: 71773, 60°43′59″N 135°05′52″W, 707 m (2,320 ft) and Whitehorse A - Climate ID: 2101300 / 2101303, WMO ID: 71964 / 71964, 60°42′34.2″N 135°04′07.8″W / 60°42′34″N 135°04′02″W, 706.2 m (2,317 ft))
Month	Jan	Feb	Mar	Apr	May	Jun	Jul	Aug	Sep	Oct	Nov	Dec	Year
Record high humidex	9.5	10.0	16.6	21.6	28.3	32.8	33.6	31.9	24.5	19.0	10.4	9.2	33.6
Record high °C (°F)	10.9 (51.6)	11.7 (53.1)	16.8 (62.2)	21.8 (71.2)	34.1 (93.4)	34.4 (93.9)	33.2 (91.8)	31.6 (88.9)	26.7 (80.1)	19.3 (66.7)	11.7 (53.1)	10.6 (51.1)	34.4 (93.9)
Mean maximum °C (°F)	3.3 (37.9)	3.7 (38.7)	7.5 (45.5)	14.7 (58.5)	22.4 (72.3)	27.0 (80.6)	27.4 (81.3)	26.5 (79.7)	19.3 (66.7)	12.5 (54.5)	4.1 (39.4)	3.1 (37.6)	29.1 (84.4)
Mean daily maximum °C (°F)	−11.1 (12.0)	−7.1 (19.2)	−1.1 (30.0)	7.1 (44.8)	14.2 (57.6)	19.3 (66.7)	20.5 (68.9)	18.5 (65.3)	12.3 (54.1)	4.3 (39.7)	−5.4 (22.3)	−9.1 (15.6)	5.2 (41.4)
Daily mean °C (°F)	−15.0 (5.0)	−11.9 (10.6)	−6.7 (19.9)	1.6 (34.9)	7.9 (46.2)	12.8 (55.0)	14.5 (58.1)	12.9 (55.2)	7.5 (45.5)	0.8 (33.4)	−8.6 (16.5)	−12.8 (9.0)	0.2 (32.4)
Mean daily minimum °C (°F)	−18.9 (−2.0)	−16.6 (2.1)	−12.4 (9.7)	−4.0 (24.8)	1.6 (34.9)	6.2 (43.2)	8.5 (47.3)	7.2 (45.0)	2.7 (36.9)	−2.8 (27.0)	−11.8 (10.8)	−16.5 (2.3)	−4.7 (23.5)
Mean minimum °C (°F)	−38.1 (−36.6)	−31.8 (−25.2)	−28.9 (−20.0)	−14.9 (5.2)	−4.7 (23.5)	0.1 (32.2)	3.5 (38.3)	0.7 (33.3)	−4.8 (23.4)	−13.9 (7.0)	−25.8 (−14.4)	−32.7 (−26.9)	−40.7 (−41.3)
Record low °C (°F)	−56.2 (−69.2)	−51.2 (−60.2)	−40.6 (−41.1)	−29.4 (−20.9)	−12.9 (8.8)	−5.7 (21.7)	−0.5 (31.1)	−4.4 (24.1)	−19.4 (−2.9)	−31.1 (−24.0)	−41.0 (−41.8)	−47.8 (−54.0)	−56.2 (−69.2)
Record low wind chill	−61.3	−62.4	−47.5	−35.0	−18.6	−6.8	0.0	−6.4	−21.4	−45.3	−51.4	−59.2	−62.4
Average precipitation mm (inches)	22.3 (0.88)	14.7 (0.58)	11.5 (0.45)	8.4 (0.33)	15.4 (0.61)	35.2 (1.39)	39.2 (1.54)	39.0 (1.54)	30.9 (1.22)	23.1 (0.91)	23.5 (0.93)	16.4 (0.65)	279.6 (11.01)
Average rainfall mm (inches)	0.1 (0.00)	0.0 (0.0)	0.0 (0.0)	1.2 (0.05)	12.9 (0.51)	34.4 (1.35)	37.5 (1.48)	40.4 (1.59)	26.8 (1.06)	9.9 (0.39)	0.9 (0.04)	0.2 (0.01)	164.3 (6.47)
Average snowfall cm (inches)	28.8 (11.3)	18.3 (7.2)	16.1 (6.3)	7.0 (2.8)	2.8 (1.1)	0.2 (0.1)	0.0 (0.0)	0.0 (0.0)	3.6 (1.4)	17.2 (6.8)	28.4 (11.2)	25.3 (10.0)	147.6 (58.1)
Average precipitation days (≥ 0.2 mm)	12.7	9.2	7.2	5.1	7.3	11.1	13.0	12.0	12.2	10.7	13.0	11.3	124.7
Average rainy days (≥ 0.2 mm)	0.17	0.06	0.0	1.1	6.9	10.8	13.0	12.3	11.6	5.4	0.88	0.37	62.7
Average snowy days (≥ 0.2 cm)	12.4	8.8	7.6	3.4	1.40	0.1	0.0	0.0	1.5	7.1	11.9	12.1	66.2
Average relative humidity (%) (at 1500 LST)	74.9	65.9	49.7	40.2	36.2	40.0	46.3	48.2	54.0	64.9	77.1	77.8	56.3
Average dew point °C (°F)	−19.1 (−2.4)	−15.8 (3.6)	−13.5 (7.7)	−7.1 (19.2)	−2.2 (28.0)	3.2 (37.8)	6.3 (43.3)	5.5 (41.9)	1.5 (34.7)	−3.8 (25.2)	−11.8 (10.8)	−16.1 (3.0)	−6.0 (21.2)
Mean monthly sunshine hours	43.8	105.5	163.2	238.5	251.1	266.7	247.6	226.5	132.7	84.9	39.8	26.8	1,827.1
Percentage possible sunshine	21.4	41.6	44.8	54.4	46.8	46.9	43.8	46.4	34.1	27.0	17.8	14.9	36.7
Average ultraviolet index	0	1	1	3	4	5	5	4	2	1	0	0	2
Source 1: Environment and Climate Change Canada (sun), (UV), (1900–1960), (January minimum), (January maximum)
Source 2: weatherstats.ca (dew point and monthly / yearly average temperature)

Climate data for Whitehorse (Riverdale) Climate ID: 2101400; coordinates 60°42′36″N 135°01′38″W; elevation: 640.1 m (2,100 ft); 1981–2010 normals, extremes 1959–present
Month	Jan	Feb	Mar	Apr	May	Jun	Jul	Aug	Sep	Oct	Nov	Dec	Year
Record high °C (°F)	10.0 (50.0)	12.8 (55.0)	13.5 (56.3)	23.5 (74.3)	34.5 (94.1)	35.6 (96.1)	34.5 (94.1)	31.7 (89.1)	26.7 (80.1)	20.0 (68.0)	12.2 (54.0)	9.5 (49.1)	35.6 (96.1)
Mean daily maximum °C (°F)	−12.1 (10.2)	−6.6 (20.1)	0.3 (32.5)	8.5 (47.3)	15.3 (59.5)	20.4 (68.7)	21.6 (70.9)	19.5 (67.1)	12.8 (55.0)	4.3 (39.7)	−6.2 (20.8)	−9.1 (15.6)	5.7 (42.3)
Daily mean °C (°F)	−16.2 (2.8)	−11.8 (10.8)	−6 (21)	1.8 (35.2)	8.0 (46.4)	13.1 (55.6)	15.1 (59.2)	13.1 (55.6)	7.5 (45.5)	0.5 (32.9)	−9.8 (14.4)	−13.2 (8.2)	0.2 (32.4)
Mean daily minimum °C (°F)	−20.4 (−4.7)	−17.0 (1.4)	−12.3 (9.9)	−4.9 (23.2)	0.7 (33.3)	5.9 (42.6)	8.5 (47.3)	6.6 (43.9)	2.1 (35.8)	−3.4 (25.9)	−13.4 (7.9)	−17.3 (0.9)	−5.4 (22.3)
Record low °C (°F)	−48.3 (−54.9)	−51.1 (−60.0)	−42.8 (−45.0)	−31.7 (−25.1)	−15.0 (5.0)	−4.4 (24.1)	−1.7 (28.9)	−5.6 (21.9)	−17.5 (0.5)	−29.5 (−21.1)	−41.7 (−43.1)	−47.8 (−54.0)	−51.1 (−60.0)
Average precipitation mm (inches)	19.2 (0.76)	13.6 (0.54)	11.7 (0.46)	6.8 (0.27)	16.3 (0.64)	33.4 (1.31)	39.6 (1.56)	36.5 (1.44)	35.3 (1.39)	26.1 (1.03)	22.7 (0.89)	20.3 (0.80)	281.6 (11.09)
Average rainfall mm (inches)	0.2 (0.01)	0.1 (0.00)	0.1 (0.00)	2.2 (0.09)	15.1 (0.59)	33.4 (1.31)	39.6 (1.56)	36.2 (1.43)	29.7 (1.17)	9.9 (0.39)	0.8 (0.03)	0.1 (0.00)	167.2 (6.58)
Average snowfall cm (inches)	19.0 (7.5)	13.5 (5.3)	11.9 (4.7)	4.6 (1.8)	1.2 (0.5)	0.0 (0.0)	0.0 (0.0)	0.4 (0.2)	5.6 (2.2)	16.3 (6.4)	21.9 (8.6)	20.2 (8.0)	114.6 (45.1)
Average precipitation days (≥ 0.2 mm)	9.7	7.3	5.7	4.5	8.0	11.4	13.6	12.4	10.1	11.2	10.3	10.1	114.3
Average rainy days (≥ 0.2 mm)	0.20	0.13	0.09	1.9	7.7	11.4	13.6	12.4	9.6	5.2	0.44	0.12	62.7
Average snowy days (≥ 0.2 cm)	9.5	7.3	5.7	2.7	0.54	0.0	0.0	0.10	1.1	7.0	10.0	10.0	53.8
Source: Environment and Climate Change Canada

=== Neighbourhoods ===
Due to Whitehorse's unique urban development objectives and varied topography, neighbourhoods are usually separated from each other by large geographical features. In addition to the city's downtown core on the Yukon River's west bank, two subdivisions sit at the same elevation as the Yukon River — 640 m (2,100 ft). Crossing the bridge to the east bank of the river leads to Riverdale, one of the city's oldest neighbourhoods. From Riverdale, the road climbing up Grey Mountain leads to Grey Mountain Cemetery and the local FM radio antenna.

The rest of Whitehorse is generally located above 690 m (2,260 ft). Immediately after climbing "Two Mile Hill", looking to the north are the old residential neighbourhoods of Takhini West, Takhini North, and Takhini East, where many homes actually are originally army barracks and military officers' residences. Yukon University, Yukon Arts Centre and Whitehorse Correctional Centre are situated in Takhini. Situated further north are Range Point, Porter Creek, and Crestview, as well as Whitehorse's newest neighbourhood, Whistle Bend, where a significant amount of new residential growth is currently occurring.

West of downtown are Valleyview, Hillcrest (also largely constituted of old military lodgings) and the Erik Nielsen Whitehorse International Airport; and beyond the Canada Games Centre along Hamilton Boulevard are the neighbourhoods of McIntyre (designated to replace inferior lands and homes of the Kwanlin Dun First Nation ("The Village") previously located where Marwell adjoins a marshy area), then Ingram, Arkell, Logan, Granger, and rapidly expanding Copper Ridge.

Whitehorse also has subdivisions designated "Country Residential" which are subject to different municipal bylaws and are located farther out from the downtown. They consist of the rural Whitehorse subdivisions of Hidden Valley and MacPherson at Whitehorse's northern limits; to the south: McCrae (also spelt MacRae), Wolf Creek, Wolf Creek North, Mary Lake, Cowley Creek, Spruce Hill, Pineridge and Fox Haven Estates. Also located at the south end of the city is the newly designated Mt. Sima Service Industrial Subdivision.

Construction of Whistle Bend, Whitehorse's newest subdivision, began in 2010 on the "Lower Bench" east of the Porter Creek subdivision.

== Attractions ==
- MacBride Copperbelt Mining Museum
- MacBride Museum of Yukon History
- Miles Canyon
- SS Klondike sternwheeler
- Yukon Beringia Interpretive Centre
- Yukon Transportation Museum

== Demographics ==
Federal census population history of Whitehorse
Year	Pop.	±%
1911	727	—
1921	331	−54.5%
1931	541	+63.4%
1941	754	+39.4%
1951	2,594	+244.0%
1956	2,570	−0.9%
1961	5,031	+95.8%
1966	4,771	−5.2%
1971	11,217	+135.1%
1976	13,311	+18.7%
1981	14,814	+11.3%
1986	15,199	+2.6%
1991	17,925	+17.9%
1996	19,157	+6.9%
2001	19,058	−0.5%
2006	20,461	+7.4%
2011	23,276	+13.8%
2016	25,085	+7.8%
2021	28,201	+12.4%
2025 estimate	30,970	+9.8%
Source: Statistics Canada

In the 2021 Census of Population conducted by Statistics Canada, Whitehorse had a population of 28,201 living in 11,436 of its 11,970 total private dwellings, a change of 12.4% from its 2016 population of 25,085. With a land area of 413.94 km^{2} (159.82 sq mi), it had a population density of 68.1/km^{2} (176.5/sq mi) in 2021.

The 2021 census reported that immigrants (individuals born outside Canada) comprise 4,195 persons or 15.1% of the total population of Whitehorse. Of the total immigrant population, the top countries of origin were Philippines (1,325 persons or 31.6%), United Kingdom (395 persons or 9.4%), United States of America (365 persons or 8.7%), India (335 persons or 8.0%), Germany (230 persons or 5.5%), China (175 persons or 4.2%), France (95 persons or 2.3%), Netherlands (70 persons or 1.7%), South Korea (65 persons or 1.5%), and Japan (60 persons or 1.4%).

As of 2021, most of the residents are Canadian citizens (91.0%).

=== Ethnicity ===
Whitehorse's population is mostly European (66.9%), but has a significant number of Indigenous peoples (16.3%): First Nations (11.7%), Metis (3.4%), and Inuit (0.7%). There is also a moderate visible minority population (16.8%): Filipino (6.6%), South Asian (3.5%), and Chinese (1.9%) were the three largest minority groups.

Panethnic groups in the City of Whitehorse (2001–2021)
Panethnic group	2021		2016		2011		2006		2001	
Panethnic group	Pop.	%	Pop.	%	Pop.	%	Pop.	%	Pop.	%
European (Note: Statistic includes all persons that did not make up part of a visible minority or an indigenous identity.)	18,535	66.85%	17,475	71.15%	17,235	75.56%	15,450	76.15%	14,995	79.28%
Indigenous	4,530	16.34%	4,420	18%	3,770	16.53%	3,785	18.65%	3,010	15.91%
Southeast Asian (Note: Statistic includes total responses of "Filipino" and "Southeast Asian" under visible minority section on census.)	1,970	7.11%	1,215	4.95%	785	3.44%	320	1.58%	305	1.61%
South Asian	975	3.52%	480	1.95%	355	1.56%	170	0.84%	205	1.08%
East Asian (Note: Statistic includes total responses of "Chinese", "Korean", and "Japanese" under visible minority section on census.)	785	2.83%	505	2.06%	420	1.82%	300	1.48%	240	1.27%
African	520	1.88%	215	0.88%	70	0.31%	95	0.47%	95	0.5%
Latin American	215	0.78%	100	0.41%	95	0.42%	95	0.47%	35	0.19%
Middle Eastern (Note: Statistic includes total responses of "West Asian" and "Arab" under visible minority section on census.)	40	0.14%	40	0.16%	0	0%	20	0.1%	10	0.05%
Other (Note: Statistic includes total responses of "Visible minority, n.i.e." and "Multiple visible minorities" under visible minority section on census.)	155	0.56%	105	0.43%	50	0.22%	50	0.25%	15	0.08%
Total responses	27,725	98.31%	24,560	97.91%	22,810	98%	20,290	99.16%	18,915	99.25%
Total population	28,201	100%	25,085	100%	23,276	100%	20,461	100%	19,058	100%

- Note: There are totals greater than 100% due to multiple origin responses.

=== Language ===
As a federal territory, the Yukon is officially bilingual in English and French. In 2011, 84.3% of the residents of Whitehorse declared English as their only mother tongue, while 4.6% reported French as their only mother tongue, and 9.7% of the population reported a non-official language as their mother tongue. According to the 2011 census the most spoken non-official language in Whitehorse was German, followed by Tagalog, Spanish, Chinese and Dutch.

The 2021 census shows 82.3% of Whitehorse residents declaring English as their mother tongue, 6.1% French, and 14.4% another language. The largest non-official language groups were Tagalog (3.6%), German (2% including Swiss German), and Punjabi (1.3%).

=== Religion ===
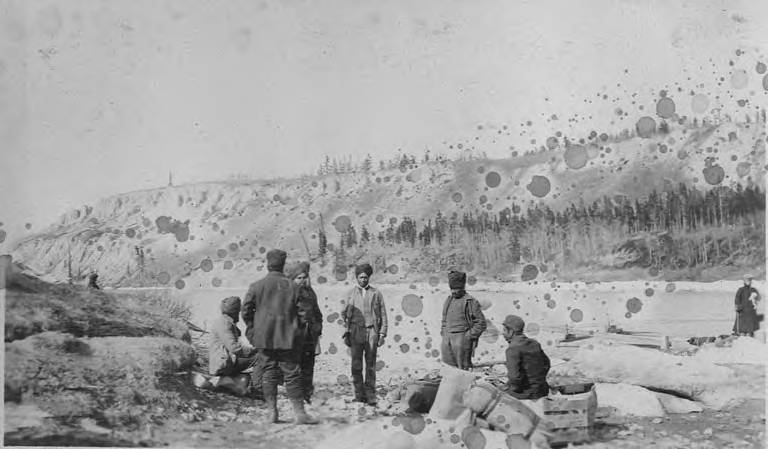
Sikhs in Whitehorse in April 1906

According to the 2021 census, religious groups in Whitehorse included:

- Irreligion (16,150 persons or 58.3%)
- Christianity (10,165 persons or 36.7%, of which 4,395 self-identify as Catholics)
- Sikhism (375 persons or 1.4%)
- Hinduism (240 persons or 0.9%)
- Buddhism (190 persons or 0.7%)
- Islam (175 persons or 0.6%)
- Indigenous Spirituality (50 persons or 0.2%)
- Judaism (45 persons or 0.2%)
- Other (340 persons or 1.2%)

== Sports ==
Whitehorse has an extensive trail network within its limits, estimated at 850 km (530 mi) in 2007, including sections of the Trans Canada Trail. These trails are used for a variety of activities, both motorized and non-motorized.

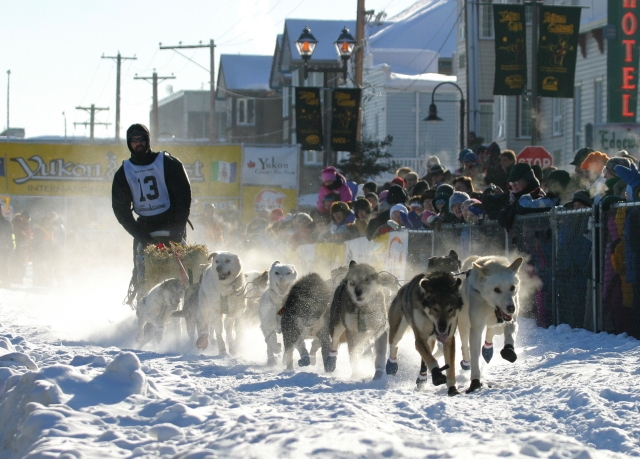
Whitehorse hosts the beginning of the Yukon Quest, an annual dog sled race from Whitehorse to Fairbanks, Alaska.

The city is responsible for the maintenance of numerous sports and recreation fields including two dozen grass/sand/soil/ice sports surfaces, three ball diamonds, the Canada Games Centre Multiplex (pools, ice rinks, fieldhouse, fitness centre, walking/running track, physiotherapy), the Takhini Arena, and Mount McIntyre Recreation Centre. Private interests run Mount Sima, which contains 350m or 1,150 ft of downhill skiing in the winter and mountain biking in the summer, three golf courses, a bowling alley, and three gyms, including one with squash courts.

The annual 1,000 mile Yukon Quest sled dog race between Whitehorse and Fairbanks, Alaska, is considered one of the toughest in the world. The race alternates its starting and finishing points each year. The city has hosted several large sporting events including the 2007 Canada Winter Games, for which a CA$45 million sport multiplex was built; the Canadian Junior Freestyle Championships in 2006, the Arctic Winter Games (2000, 1992, 1986, 1980, 1972, 2012 and up coming location for the 2026 games), the annual International Curling Bonspiel, and the Dustball International Slowpitch Tournament. Other major sports events held by Whitehorse include:

- 2007 Canada Winter Games
- 2008 and 2014 Junior Men's Softball World Championship
- 2012 Women's Softball World Championship
- 2017 Men's Softball World Championship

Although there are no territorial junior league teams, the business community sponsors a number of local teams of volleyball, baseball, basketball, broomball, ice hockey, soccer, ultimate disk, and squash. High school teams are very active and partake in competitions with schools in neighbouring Alaska, and a few local athletes have flourished on the Canadian sports scene. Whitehorse is also home to the Whitehorse Glacier Bears swimming club.

== Government ==
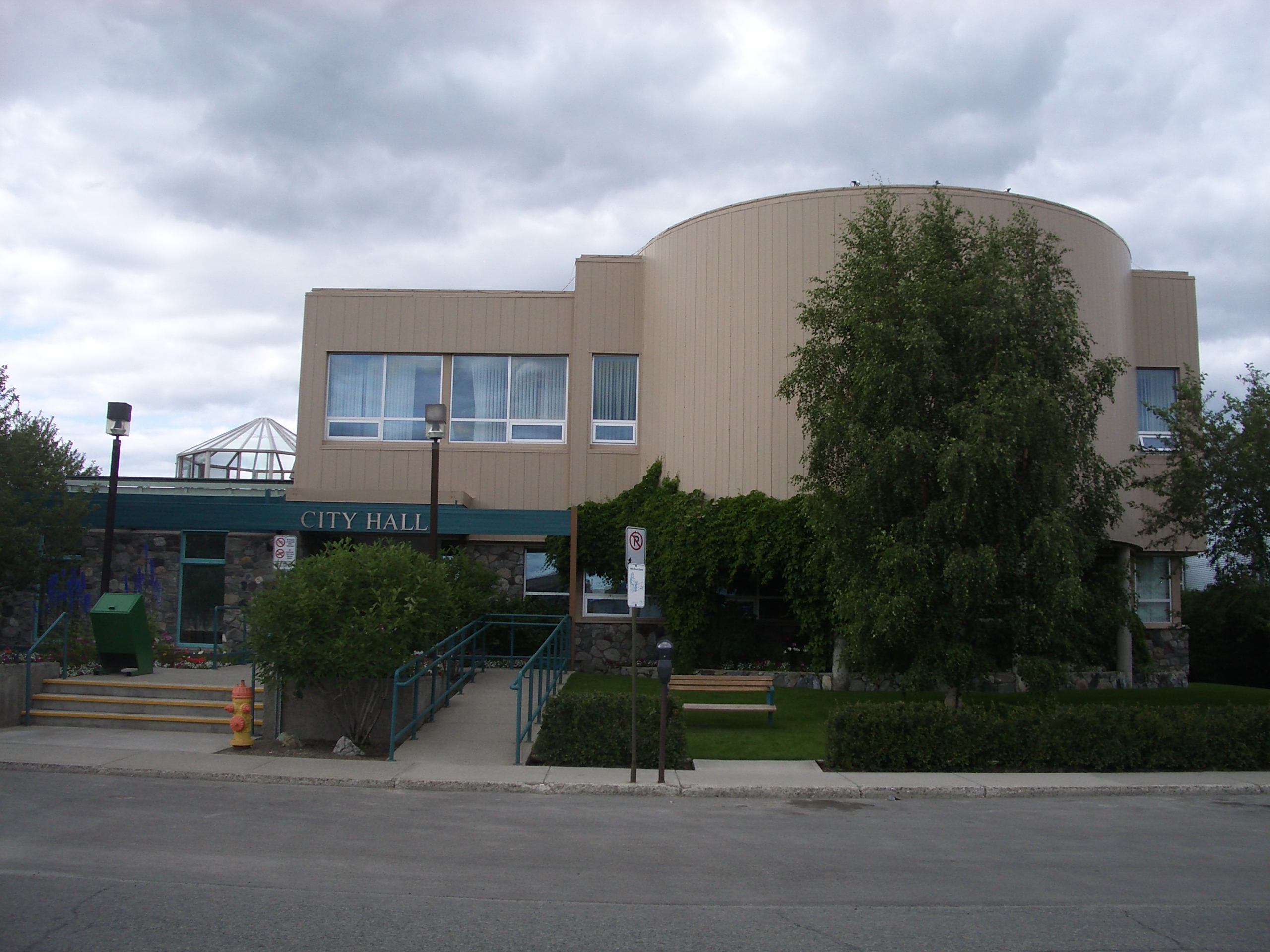
City Hall is home to the Whitehorse City Council.

=== Municipal ===
Whitehorse municipal elections occur every three years. The current mayor of Whitehorse is Kirk Cameron. Municipal services provided by the city of Whitehorse include: water and sewer systems, road maintenance, snow and ice control, non-recyclable waste and composting, as well as a mosquito control program.

=== Territorial ===
Whitehorse was represented by 13 of 21 MLAs in Yukon's Legislative Assembly, as per the 2024 map of Yukon electoral districts. In 2009 Yukon's electoral map was modified to give Whitehorse an extra seat, bringing its total up to 10 out of 19. The Legislative Assembly Building is located in downtown Whitehorse and elections usually take place every three to five years. The last general election was held in 2025. Whitehorse residents have three local political parties from which to choose: Yukon Liberal Party, Yukon New Democratic Party, Yukon Party.

=== Federal ===
Whitehorse federal election results
Year	Liberal		Conservative		New Democratic		Green	
2021	33%	3,036	26%	2,431	24%	2,196	5%	420
2019	33%	3,500	32%	3,323	24%	2,521	10%	1,060

All of Yukon consists of a single federal electoral district and therefore there is only one Member of Parliament (MP) and 65% of Yukon's voters live in Whitehorse. Residents of the Yukon have been voting federally since a byelection returned the first Yukon MP in January 1903 and, from 1984 onward, have had candidates from at least four federal political parties to choose from. In 2006, 2008 and 2011, the choices have been: Conservative, Green, Liberal, and NDP. Other parties that have contested the riding from 1984 onward include the Libertarian Party, the Rhinoceros Party, the three precursors of the Conservative Party (Reform Party, Canadian Alliance and Progressive Conservatives), the National Party (1993) and the Christian Heritage Party.

Liberal Brendan Hanley is Yukon's MP.

=== Judicial ===
All court matters are handled in Whitehorse at the Andrew Philipsen Law Building which also houses a law library. Yukon's Territorial Court (three judges) handles most adult criminal prosecutions under the criminal code and other federal statutes. The Supreme Court of Yukon has three resident judges and nine judges from NWT and Nunavut. The Court of Appeal, made up of justices from British Columbia, Yukon, NWT and Nunavut, sits in Whitehorse only one week of the year, so most appeals are heard in Vancouver, British Columbia.

=== Military ===
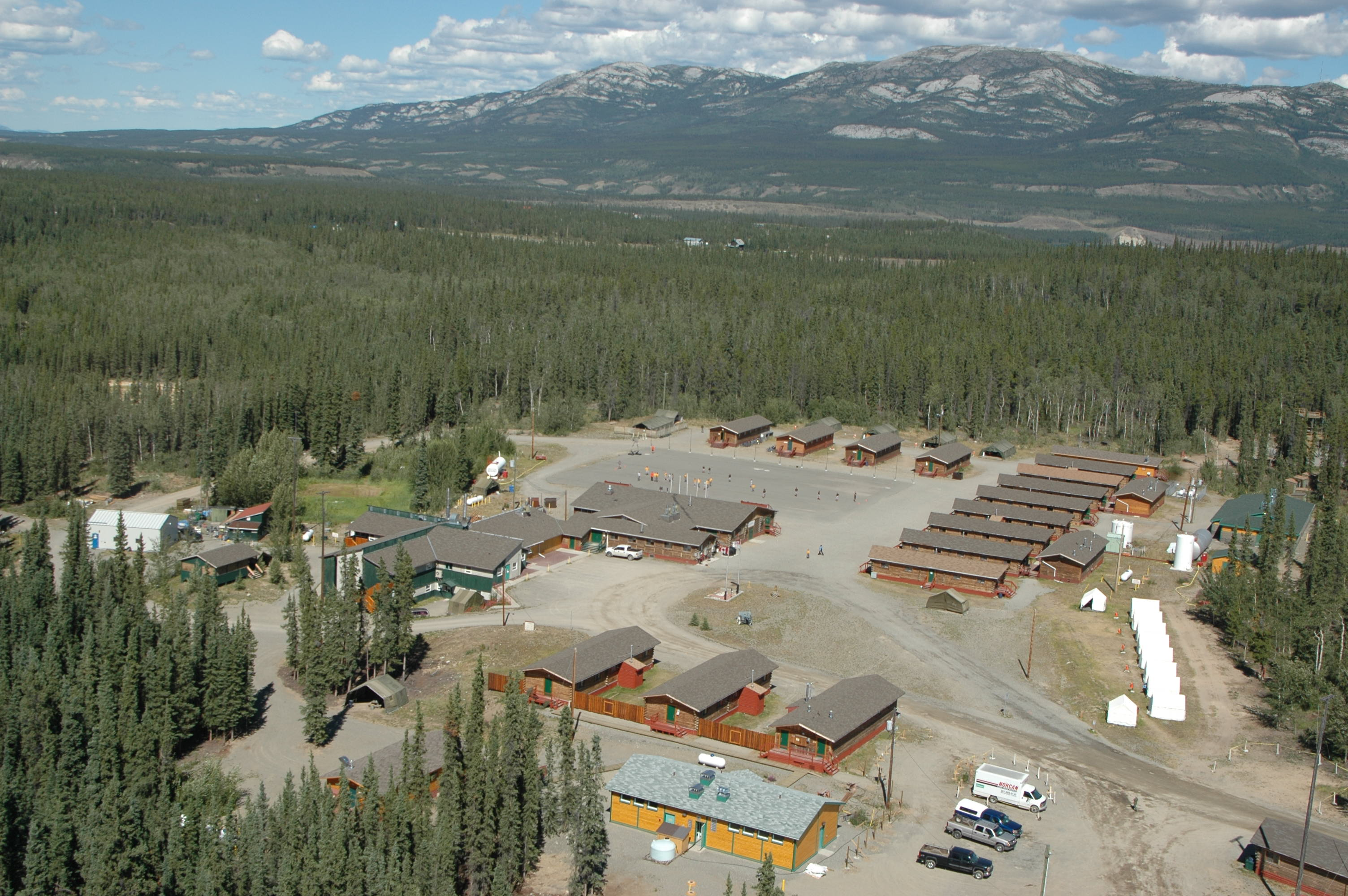
Aerial view of Whitehorse Cadet Summer Training Centre. The facility is used by the Canadian Cadet Organization.

The Canadian Armed Forces is represented in Whitehorse by Canadian Forces Detachment Yukon located in downtown Whitehorse, Regional Cadet Support Unit (North) was at Boyle Barracks (until a re-organization in 2012 amalgamated the cadet support unit into Regional Cadet Support Unit (NW) based out of Winnipeg, Manitoba) and the Canadian Rangers of the Whitehorse Patrol of 1 Canadian Ranger Patrol Group. 2685 Yukon Regiment Army Cadet Corps and 551 Whitehorse Squadron, Royal Canadian Air Cadets of the Canadian Cadet Organizations also operate in Whitehorse. All units operate as part of Canadian Forces Joint Task Force (North).

440 Transport Squadron, and other units of the Royal Canadian Air Force, including the Snowbirds often operate and train out of Erik Nielsen Whitehorse International Airport, formerly RCAF Station Whitehorse.

Boyle Barracks is located 20 km (12 mi) south of downtown Whitehorse. The facility houses Regional Cadet Support Unit (North), Whitehorse Cadet Summer Training Centre, service support elements of Joint Task Force (North), and is used by 1 Canadian Ranger Patrol Group, the Junior Canadian Rangers, and other units to conduct training. Boyle Barracks is located on the property of the unused Wolf Creek Juvenile Corrections Centre which is leased by the Department of National Defence from the Yukon Government.

Whitehorse Cadet Summer Training Centre offers a variety of courses and activities that focus on general training, leadership, and expedition training up to the instructor level. Courses are two, three, and six weeks long and are offered throughout the summer. Personnel are drawn primarily from the territories, but many come from across Canada. The training centre also hosts members of the United Kingdom's Army Cadet Force and Combined Cadet Force.

== Education ==
Whitehorse has several schools as part of a Yukon Government operated public school system. Except for École Émilie-Tremblay, Yukon does not have school boards. However, each school has a council composed of three to seven elected positions for two-year terms, consisting of (and elected by) citizens residing in the school's assigned area and parents of students attending the school. All teachers are employed directly by the Department of Education, and there are no tuition fees to be paid to attend elementary and secondary institutions with the exception of the Wood Street Centre School, which offers specialized experiential programs for high school students in the sciences and arts. Yukon schools follow British Columbia's school curriculum.

=== Primary education (K-3) ===
- Grey Mountain Primary

=== Elementary education (K-7) ===
- Christ the King Elementary (Catholic)
- Elijah Smith Elementary
- Golden Horn Elementary
- Hidden Valley Elementary
- Holy Family Elementary (Catholic)
- Jack Hulland Elementary
- Selkirk Elementary (French and English Immersion)
- Takhini Elementary
- École Whitehorse Elementary (French and late French Immersion)

=== Secondary education ===
- St. Francis of Assisi Catholic Secondary School (Catholic)
- F.H. Collins Secondary School (English and French Immersion)
- Porter Creek Secondary School

=== French First Language school (K-12) ===
- École Émilie-Tremblay

=== Specialized programs ===
- Wood St. School (programs are attended by students drawn from the high schools)
- Individual Learning Centre (for students who have had trouble in the regular school program and are not attending school)
- Aurora Virtual School (online cours platform for students taking courses not offered in their respective communities or students who prefer online study)

=== Post-secondary education ===
- Yukon University (Formerly Yukon College) confers bachelor's degrees, diplomas, certificates as well as trades and vocational training and adult basic education. It is the only university based in Northern Canada.

== Media ==
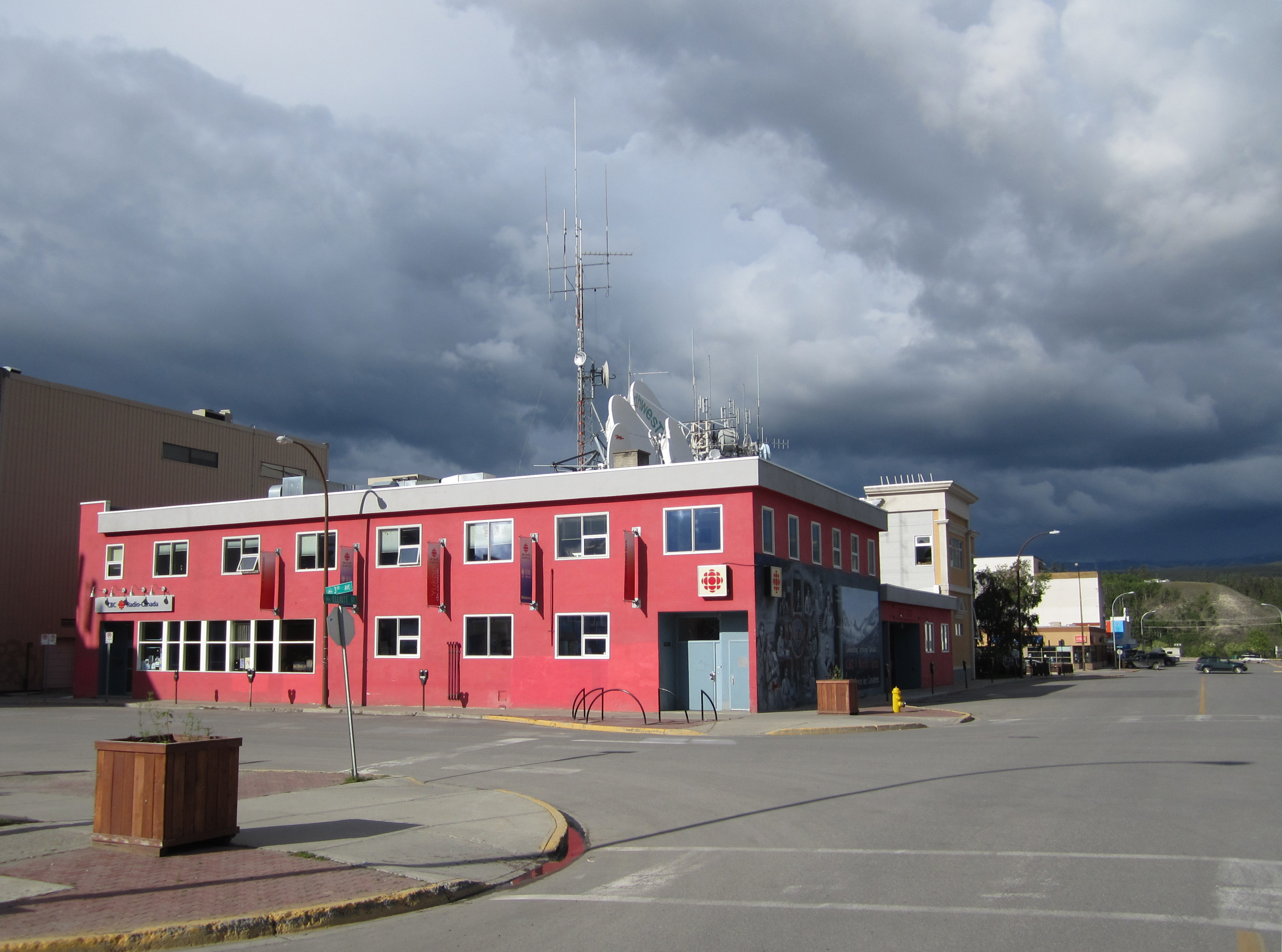
Broadcasting studio for CFWH-FM, which broadcasts programming from CBC Radio One. CFWH-FM is one of seven radio stations based in Whitehorse.

=== Broadcast ===
==== Radio ====
Frequency	Call sign	Branding	Format	Owner	Notes
FM 92.5	CJUC-FM	The Juice	Community Radio	Utilities Consumers Group	
FM 94.5	CFWH-FM	CBC Radio One	Talk radio, public radio	Canadian Broadcasting Corporation	Part of CBC North
FM 96.1	CKRW-FM	The Rush	Hot adult contemporary	Klondike Broadcasting	
FM 98.1	CHON-FM	–	Community radio	Northern Native Broadcasting	First Nations community radio
FM 100.3	VF2356	Golden Horn	Community radio	Whitehorse Chamber of Commerce	Tourist information radio service
FM 100.7	CIAY-FM	Life 100.7	Religious broadcasting	New Life FM	
FM 102.1	CFWY-FM	Ici Radio-Canada Première	Talk radio, public radio	Association Franco-Yukonnaise	Community-owned rebroadcaster of CBUF-FM (Vancouver)
FM 104.5	CBU-FM-8	CBC Music	Assorted music, public radio	Canadian Broadcasting Corporation	Rebroadcaster of CBU-FM (Vancouver)

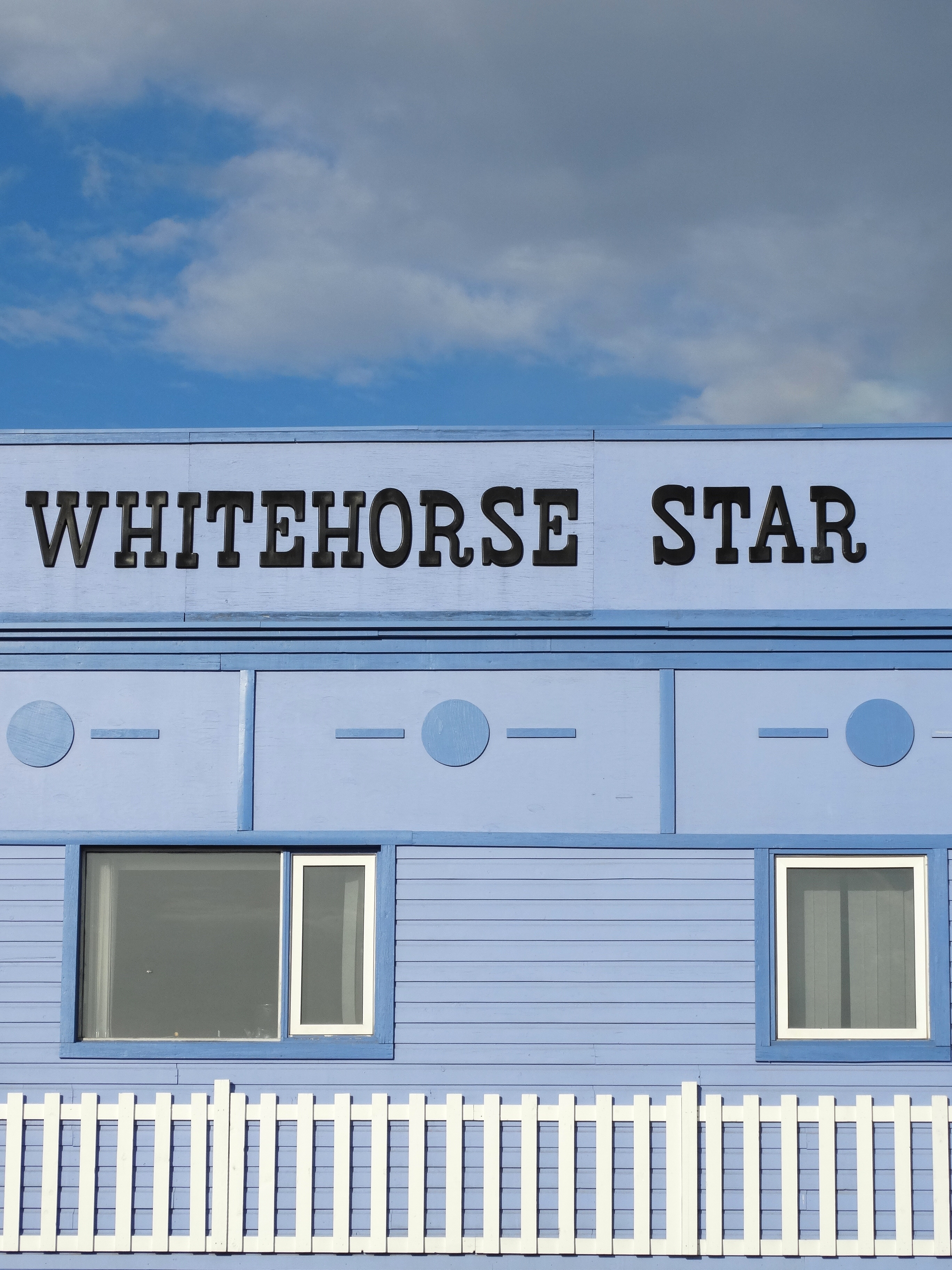
Building for the Whitehorse Daily Star. The Daily Star is one of three newspapers operating in Whitehorse.

Whitehorse is also served by CIY270, a Weatheradio Canada station broadcasting at 162.400 MHz on the weather band.

==== Television ====
Local cable provider NorthwesTel hosts three local television channels: Community Cable 9, an advertisement slide-show channel and a public service channel.

CBC Television operated an affiliate in Whitehorse, CFWH-TV, from 1968 to 2012. Initially served using the Frontier Coverage Package until Anik satellite broadcasts became available early in 1973; this transmitter was shut down on July 31, 2012, due to budget cuts.

=== Print ===
Whitehorse's two major English-language newspapers are the Whitehorse Daily Star (founded as a weekly in 1900, but ceased publication in 2024) and the Yukon News (founded as a weekly in 1960 by Ken Shortt, published five days a week from 1967 to 1999, and currently prints twice weekly). Other local newspapers include What's Up Yukon (a local free music, arts, culture, events, weekly founded in 2005) and a French-language newspaper L'Aurore boréale (founded in 1983).

The quarterly magazine Yukon, North of Ordinary started in 2007.

== Infrastructure ==
=== Emergency services ===
Whitehorse contracts out its police service to the Royal Canadian Mounted Police, with the main police station on 4th avenue in the city centre. Whitehorse's ambulance service are run by Yukon Government's Emergency Medical Services and is staffed by full-time Primary Care Paramedics (PCP) and Advanced Care Paramedics (ACP). Whitehorse's Search and Rescue (SAR) is ensured by a partnership between the RCMP, YG's Emergency Measures Organization (EMO) and volunteer SAR teams.

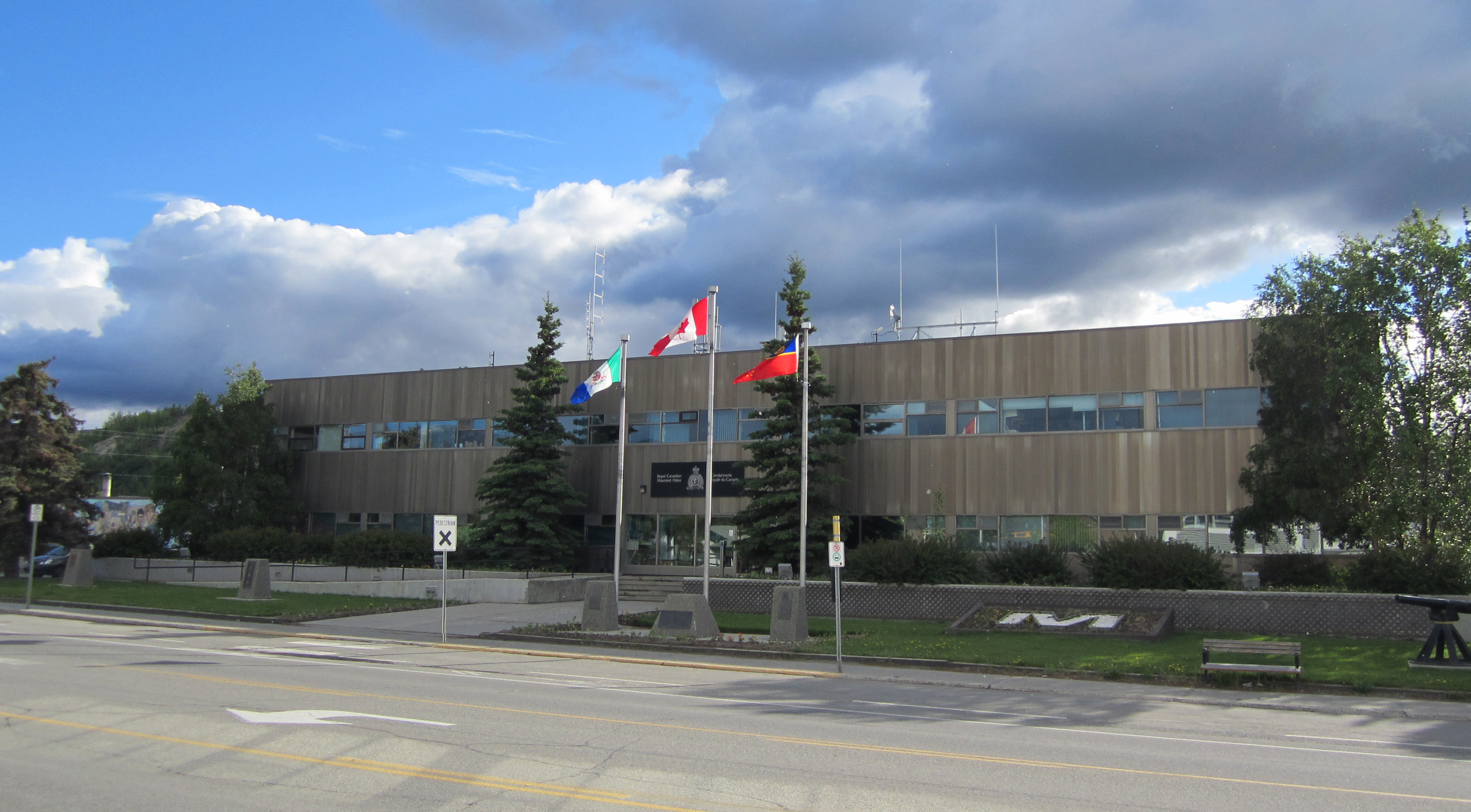
Offices for the Royal Canadian Mounted Police M Division. Policing in Whitehorse is carried out by the RCMP.

Whitehorse has its own fire service, known as City of Whitehorse Fire Department (WHFD) with two fire stations. The first, Station #1, located in the city centre at the corner of Second Avenue and Steele Street, and Station #2 (305 B Range Road) atop "Two Mile Hill" on the west side, with room for three trucks. It was built in 2010 to become a public safety building. The original fire hall located along on the waterfront has been preserved as a historic building and cultural centre. The Fire Department currently operates with thirty-three full-time staff and approximately ten volunteers. Both fire stations are staffed 24/7 through a rotation of four platoons of six firefighters and one dispatcher.

WHFD is equipped and trained to respond to Motor vehicle Accidents, high and low angle rescue, confined space, and static water ice rescue. Haz-mat, swift water and urban search and rescue are not under the department's current capabilities or can only be responded to at awareness levels. All medical emergencies are responded to by Yukon Government Emergency Medical Services. All aircraft emergencies are dealt with by the Eric Nielsen Whitehorse International Airport(ENWIA) ARFF fire department with mutual aid agreement activities from WHFD. Whitehorse Fire Department is professionally represented by the IAFF and the BCPFFA.

Whitehorse Fire Department is the largest municipal fire department in the territory and the only professional one. Though they are 13% of the total population of firefighters in the territory, WHFD protects 82% of the population, and responds to 84% of fire calls within the Yukon. WHFD falls under the authority of the Yukon Fire Marshals Office (FMO) and reports directly to it. Fire and life safety inspection throughout the City of Whitehorse are conducted by the Whitehorse Fire Department duty crews as well as designated Fire Prevention Officers under the direction of Municipal Bylaw 2000–01 "Emergency Services Bylaw" with authority from the current edition of the National Fire Code of Canada.

Wildland fire crews also operate in the summer to combat the forest fires across the territory. They will lend assistance to crews in B.C., Alberta, and the other territories as needed.

=== Energy grid ===
Yukon Energy operates four conventional hydroelectric generating stations: Whitehorse Dam (40 MW), Aishihik Lake (37 MW), Mayo A (5 MW), and Mayo B (10 MW), which provide the bulk of generation for the Yukon Energy grid. An additional 39 MW of diesel generation is maintained for supplemental back-up.

Additionally, Yukon Energy operated two wind turbines near Whitehorse, which were decommissioned in 2018. Four new turbines are under construction and expected to begin feeding electricity into the grid during the winter of 2023/2024.

=== Health care ===
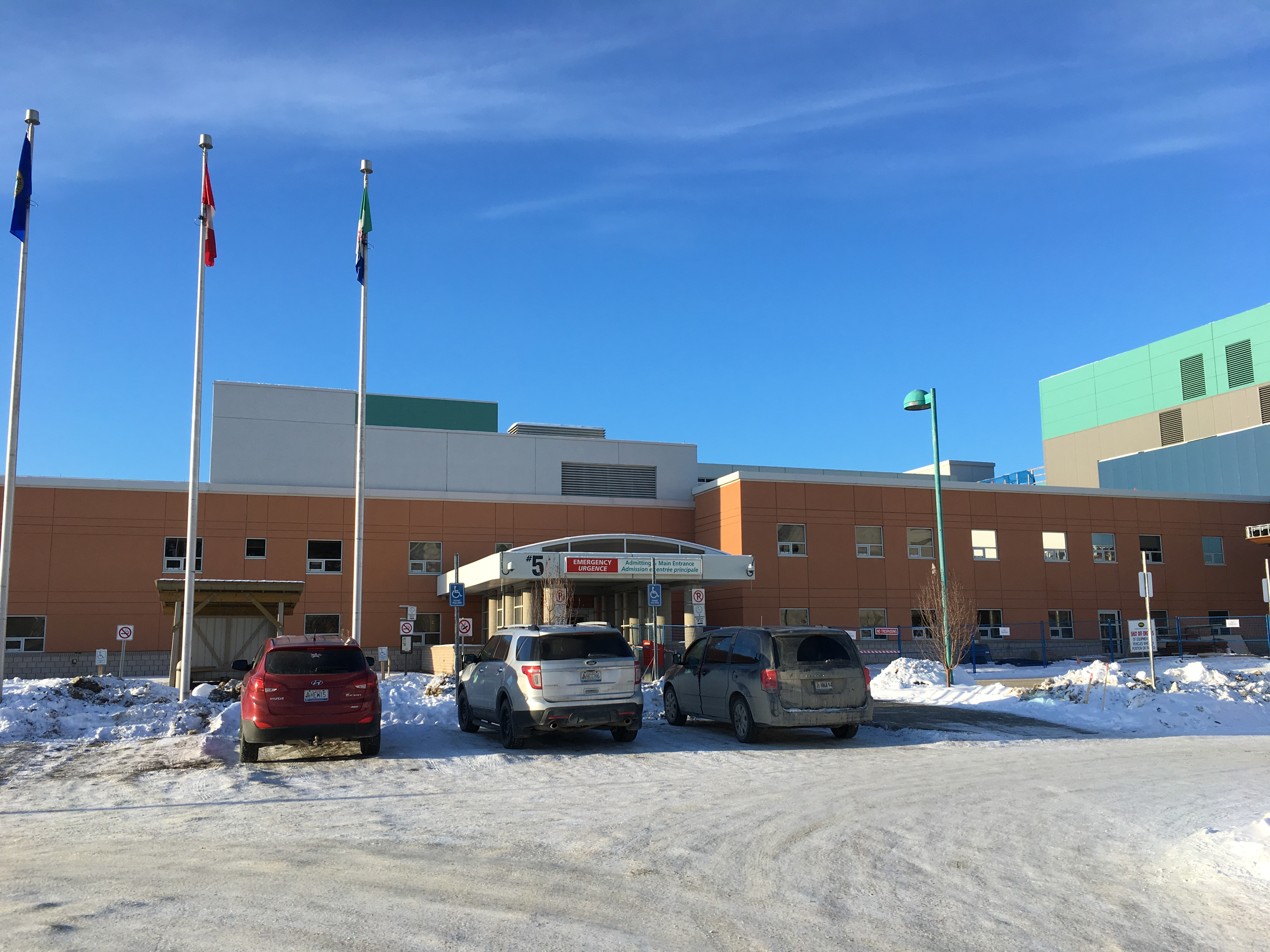
Whitehorse General Hospital is the only hospital in the city.

The first "White Horse General Hospital" (WGH) was built in the downtown area in 1902 with a 10-bed capacity. During World War I beds increased to 30, 10 beds were added in 1943, then 20 beds in 1949, and an operating wing was added in 1951. In 1959 the hospital was rebuilt on the other bank of the Yukon River, across from its previous location, but decision making was still based in Ottawa (National Health and Welfare, Medical Services Branch). The downtown area has several private medical, dental, and optometry clinics.

In 1990, the Yukon Hospital Corporation (YHC) was created in order to prepare the transfer of powers regarding the hospital from the Federal Government to the Yukon Territorial Government. In April 1993 management of WGH was officially transferred to the YHC following a collaboration with the Yukon government and Council of Yukon First Nations (CYFN, then CYI). Construction of the present building lasted from 1994 through 1997. As of 2021, Whitehorse General Hospital contains 56 beds, emergency care services, and several medical imaging technologies.

== Transportation ==
=== Air ===
Whitehorse is served by the Erik Nielsen Whitehorse International Airport. It has, as of 2022, scheduled service to Vancouver, Kelowna, Victoria, Calgary, Edmonton, Dawson City, Old Crow and Inuvik. Seasonal scheduled service is provided to Yellowknife (nonstop), Ottawa (via Yellowknife), and Toronto (via Yellowknife). The airport was developed as part of the Northwest Staging Route in 1941–42 and has two long paved runways. A wartime-era hangar served as a terminal building from about 1960, and was replaced in December 1985 with a modern terminal. Air North, a scheduled passenger and cargo airline operating Boeing 737 jetliners and ATR 42 turboprops, is based in Whitehorse. Alkan Air provides charter and medical services and also operates a flying school.

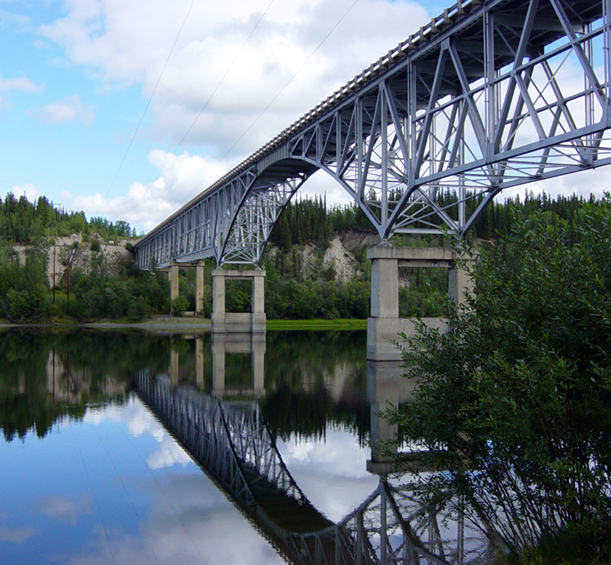
Bridge of the Alaska Highway crossing over the Teslin River at Johnsons Crossing

=== Roads ===
Surface access to Whitehorse is provided by a network of highways, including the international Alaska Highway connecting the Yukon with Alaska, British Columbia, and Alberta highway networks.

Whitehorse has been described as "pearls on a string", with its residential, industrial, and service subdivisions located along the main thoroughfares that carry traffic within city limits, with large gaps of undeveloped (often hilly) land between them. The Alaska Highway is the primary roadway, with branch roads reaching additional subdivisions. One such branch road, signed as "Highway 1A" and following Two Mile Hill Road, 4th Avenue, 2nd Avenue, and Robert Service Way, is the main access to downtown, Riverdale, and the Marwell Industrial Area.

The city's road network is adequate, although it is congested during rush hours, and discussions occasionally occur as to how it might be better managed, such as by designating one-way streets.

=== Public transit ===
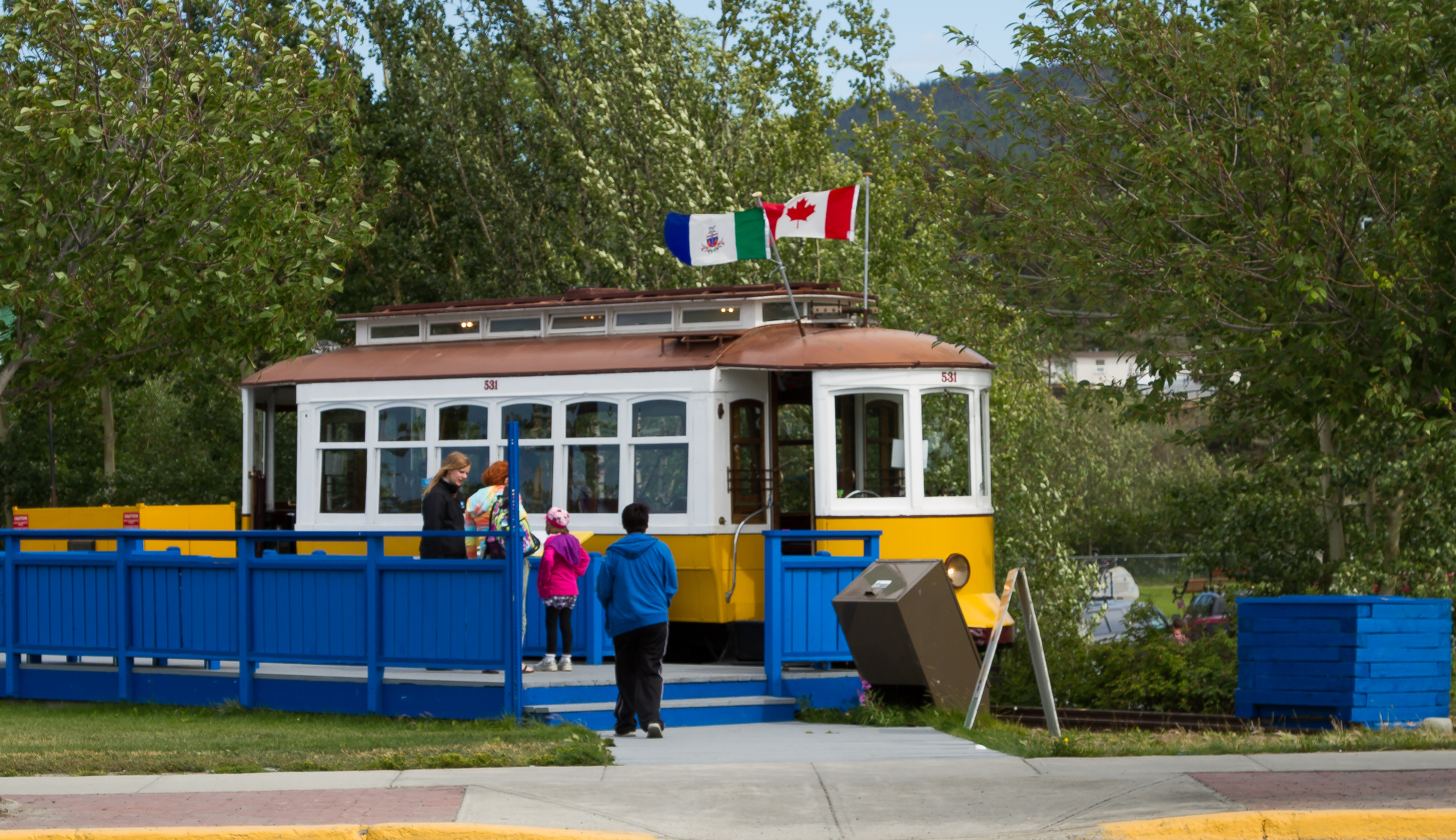
The Whitehorse Waterfront Trolley is a heritage streetcar service that operated from 2000 to 2018 and again 2024.

Whitehorse Transit provides bus service on weekdays from about 6:40 am to 10 pm, and on weekends and holidays to about 8 pm. For passengers who have difficulty using the transit buses, there is a Handy Bus Service.

There is a waterfront tram, known as the "trolley", which provides transport along a short rail section along the Yukon River in the Summer; it is leisure- and tourist-oriented, operated by a non-profit society, and not integrated into the municipal transit system. It runs from the Roundhouse to Rotary Peace Park, located on the south end of the city centre (the Northern stretch between Roundhouse and Spook Creek Station was included until 2018, but the City administration has removed necessary train tracks since) on a small portion of the tracks formerly belonging to White Pass and Yukon Route.

Other than that, Whitehorse presently has no active railway service.

The White Pass Railway offers seasonal service between Skagway, Alaska and Carcross, 72 km (45 mi) south of Whitehorse.

==== Water ====
The Yukon River is essentially navigable from Whitehorse to the Bering Sea. At 640 m (2,100 ft) above sea level, the river at Whitehorse is the highest point on earth that can be reached by watercraft navigating from the sea. Currently, no passenger or freight services use the river at Whitehorse.

== Sister cities ==
- Juneau, Alaska, United States, Since 1993.
- Chortkiv, Ukraine, since 2023.
- Lancieux, France, since 2000.
- Ushiku, Japan, since 1985.

Historical sister city partnerships:

- Echuca, Australia, November 1977 – September 2008.

== Notable people ==
- Byron Baltimore, National Hockey League player
- Dahria Beatty, Olympic cross-country skier
- Zachary Bell, Whitehorse-born Olympic cyclist
- Pierre Berton, author and television host, born in Whitehorse
- Ivan E. Coyote, spoken word performer and writer, born in Whitehorse in 1969
- Dylan Cozens, professional hockey player for the Ottawa Senators
- Stéphanie Dixon, para-athlete
- Randy Hahn, play-by-play commentator for the San Jose Sharks
- Stephen Kozmeniuk, musician who created the band Boy, music producer/composer who has worked with Madonna, Kendrick Lamar, and others
- Archie Lang, represented the electoral district of Porter Creek Centre in the Yukon Legislative Assembly from 2002 to 2011
- Jeane Lassen, Olympic weightlifter
- Paul Lucier, Yukon's first senator
- Dawn Macdonald, poet
- Sarah MacDougall, Swedish/Canadian singer-songwriter, resides in Whitehorse
- Gavin McKenna, hockey player for the Toronto Maple Leafs and first overall pick in the 2026 NHL entry draft
- Audrey McLaughlin, the first woman to lead a represented political party (NDP) in Canadian federal politics, who has resided in Whitehorse since 1979
- Scott Moffatt, singer and guitarist
- Joey Moi, music producer, songwriter, and captain of the Big Loud Beauties
- Aaron Olson, basketball player
- Gurdeep Pandher, Bhangra dancer
- Tahmoh Penikett, actor whose credits include Battlestar Galactica and Dollhouse
- Tony Penikett, mediator and negotiator who served as the third premier of Yukon from 1985 to 1992
- Jim Robb, watercolour painter
- Sonjaa Schmidt, Olympic cross country skier, first Canadian woman to win a gold medal at the Nordic Junior World Ski Championships
- Thomas Scoffin, Youth Olympic bronze medalist in curling
- Robert W. Service, known as The Bard of the Yukon for his poems The Shooting of Dan McGrew, The Cremation of Sam McGee and many other depicting the Gold Rush and the special atmosphere of the Klondike. Whitehorse City Council which paid tribute to Robert Service with several monuments: Robert Service's Road, a Bust near where he lived, a Memorial Desk at the corner of 2nd Avenue and Main Street and various celebrations through the sister city relationship with the town of Lancieux.
- Amy Sloan, television actress
- Peter Sturgeon, National Hockey League player
- Frederick Trump, cofounder of the Whitehorse Hotel and grandfather of Donald Trump
- Martyn S. Williams, mountain and wilderness guide who is the first person in the world to lead expeditions to the three extremes, South Pole (1989) North Pole (1992) and Everest (1991)
- Greg Wiltjer, basketball player

Notable politicians include the first female mayor of Whitehorse, in 1975, Ione Christensen, whose family had moved to Whitehorse in 1949.

== See also ==
- List of municipalities in Yukon
- "Bob Smart's Dream", a 1906 poem by Robert Service that speculates about the Whitehorse of the future.
- This Dollar Saved My Life at Whitehorse, a 2001 album by Lucyfire
