= Whitehorse Waterfront Trolley =

Heritage trolley line in Whitehorse, Yukon, Canada

Coordinates: 60.7217°N 135.0510°W

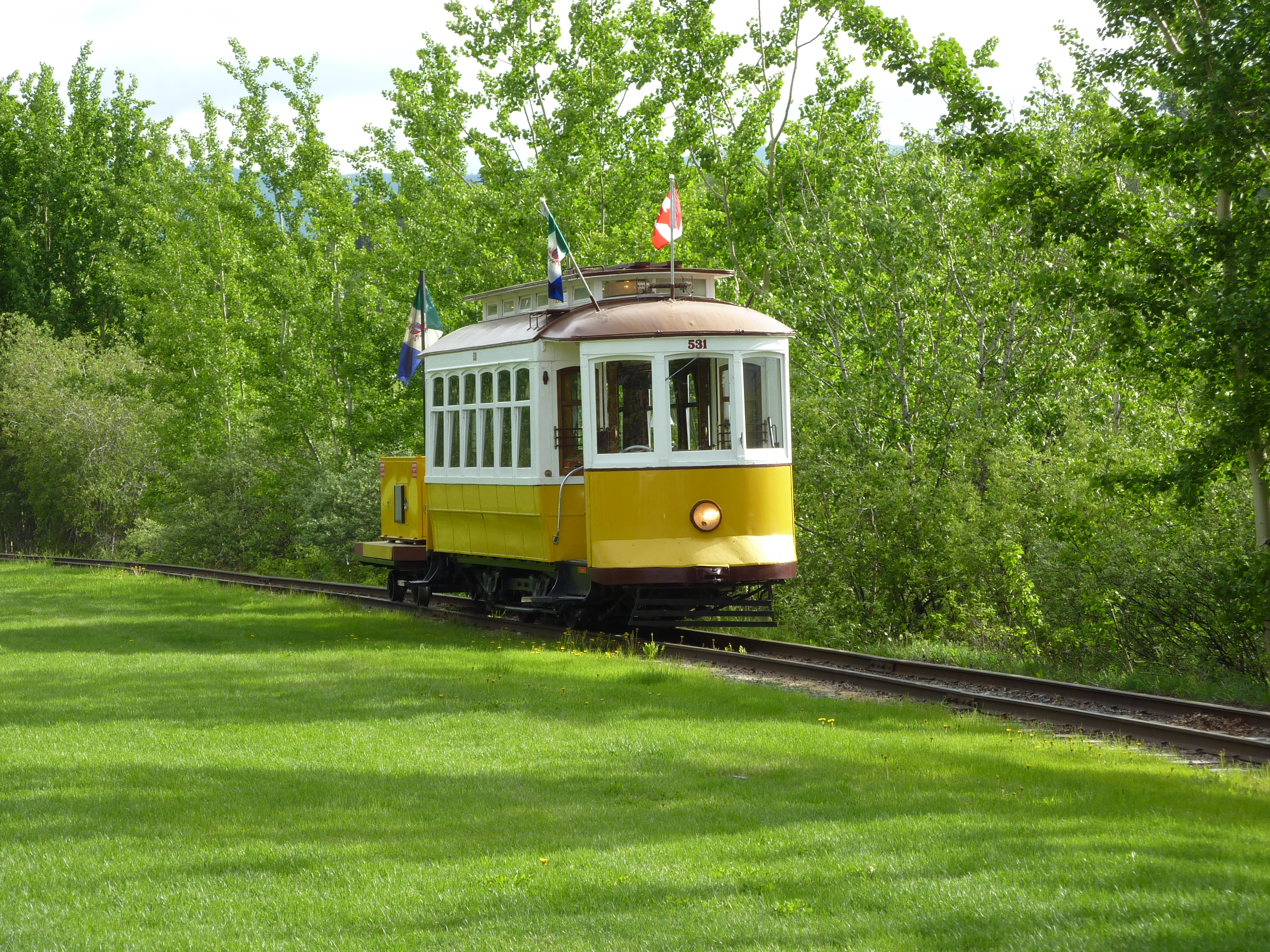

Overview
- Locale: Whitehorse, Yukon, Canada
- Transit type: Heritage streetcar, seasonal
- Number of lines: 1
- Number of stations: 4 (7 2005-2016)

Operation
- Began operation: July 15, 2000; Reopened June 14, 2024
- Ended operation: September 1, 2018 (last service); 2019 (official termination), before 2024 reopening
- Operator: MacBride Museum

Technical
- Track gauge: 3 ft (914 mm)

The Whitehorse Waterfront Trolley, also known as the MacBride Waterfront Trolley, is a heritage streetcar service in Whitehorse, Yukon, Canada.

The line first ran on July 15, 2000, running 1.14 km (0.71 mi) from the Roundhouse to Rotary Peace Park. On June 30, 2005, it was extended an additional 1.27 km (0.79 mi) from the Roundhouse to Spook Creek. The 2005 section was last used on October 2, 2016, and the original track on September 1, 2018, before the service's 2024 reopening.

The line uses a single reconditioned trolley which carries tourists along Whitehorse's waterfront along the Yukon River. The electricity to power the trolley's electric motors comes not from overhead trolley wires, but instead from a diesel generator. The car ran each year from July to September, until 2018. It restarted service in 2024.

== Stops ==
- Spook Creek (closed since October 2, 2016)
- Jarvis Street (closed since October 2, 2016)
- Library and Cultural Centre (request only; closed since October 2, 2016)
- Trolley Roundhouse
- White Pass
- Visitor Information Centre
- Rotary Park

Until 2018, the streetcar ran daily from noon until 4:00. A complete trip took approximately 15 minutes. The car is stored in a roundhouse/train shed at 1127 First Avenue, at the end of Wood Street.

== Discontinuation of service ==
While repairs to the track aimed to have service resumed by mid-summer 2018, it was announced the trolley would not operate in the 2018 season. In April 2018, the Yukon Government announced they would cease funding the trolley due to its financial burden. Shortly after, in June 2019, track infrastructure was still deteriorating and considered a hazard. One month later, near the end of July 2019, due to concerns about deteriorating timber that covered street-running areas, these sections were lifted.

== Revival ==
On June 14, 2024, the service was reintroduced on a shorter stretch, from Roundhouse to Rotary Park. In summer, the timetable is Tuesday to Friday, noon to 4 pm, along with various special evening events. Autumn timetable is Saturdays only, noon to 3pm.

== Car 531 details ==
Whitehorse Waterfront Trolley
- In service: Lisbon: 1925–1973; Whitehorse: 2000–2019, 2024-present
- Manufacturers: Santo Amaro Works of Lisbon electric tramways, Portugal using kits from the J. G. Brill Company, Philadelphia
- Constructed: 1925
- Number built: 24
- Capacity: 24 seats

Specifications
- Maximum speed: 74 km/h (46 mph)
- Weight: 10 t (11.0 short tons; 9.8 long tons)
- Traction system: Electric
- Engine type: Diesel engine on the generator car
- Traction motors: 4 × General Electric
- Power output: 4 × 25 hp (19 kW)
- Electric systems: 600 V DC from a diesel generator (originally 550 V DC trolley wires on the Lisbon electric tramways)
- Current collection: jumper cable
- Track gauge: 3 ft (914 mm) (originally 900 mm or 2 ft 11 7/16 in on the Lisbon electric tramways)

The car originally served the trolley/streetcar system of Lisbon, Portugal, from 1925 to 1978. In 1978, it was sold along with car 530 by Companhia de Carris de Ferro de Lisboa (Carris, or CCFL), in Lisbon, to the Lake Superior Railroad Museum in Duluth. In 1999, it was sold to Whitehorse and restored by Historic Railway Restoration of Arlington, Washington.

The trolley is a 3 ft (914 mm) narrow gauge vehicle and runs on track built for the White Pass and Yukon Route. It has a capacity of 24 passengers. This single-truck (four wheels on two axles), double-ended trolley car was previously owned by the Lake Superior Railroad Museum, which still owns sister car 530.

== See also ==
- List of heritage railways in Canada
- Generator car
