= Downtown Whitehorse =

Downtown neighbourhood in Whitehorse, Yukon, Canada

Coordinates: 60.72030°N 135.05270°W

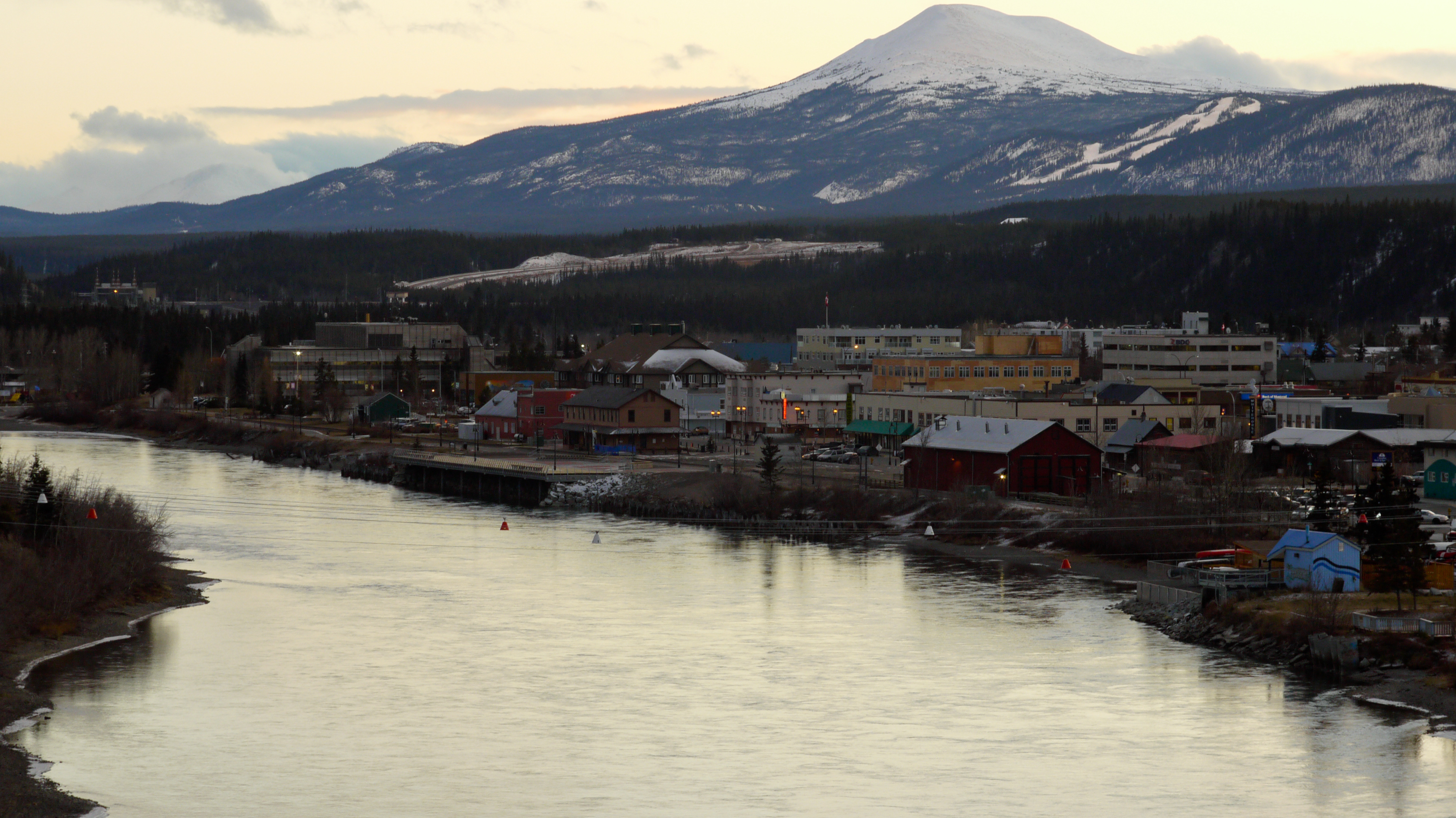
Skyline of Downtown Whitehorse from the east side of the Yukon River.

Downtown Whitehorse is a neighbourhood in Whitehorse, Yukon, Canada. The downtown area serves as Whitehorse's city centre and central business district.

== History ==
Downtown Whitehorse originally encompassed the entirety of Whitehorse prior to the Second World War. After the war, the periphery was developed, with residents beginning to move into the Riverdale subdivision on the east bank of the river, and to suburbs outside the city limits such as Porter Creek, then to the Takhini and Hillcrest subdivisions after the military withdrew from the city in 1968. In 1971, the city limits were extended beyond downtown, officially establishing a larger city with the original area now merely the downtown area of a much larger municipal area.

== Layout ==
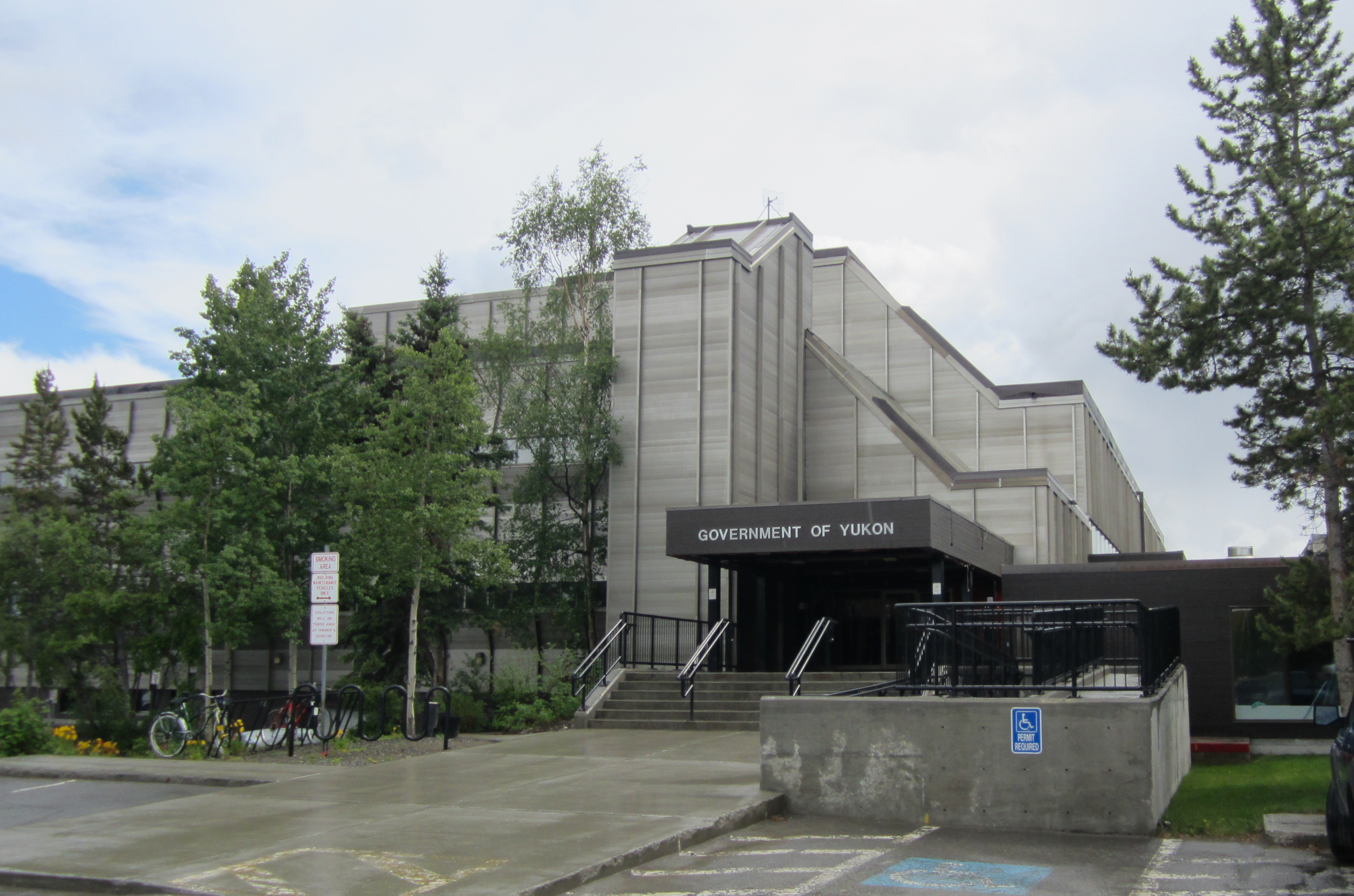
The Yukon Legislative Building is located in Downtown Whitehorse.

Downtown Whitehorse is the commercial centre of the city. The Yukon Legislative Building is located in this area and was built in 1976. It is generally considered to extend from the narrows between the clay cliffs and the Yukon River just south of Taylor Street, north to the east–west leg of the Second Avenue extension, and from the Yukon River to the base of the clay cliffs. Business activities are mainly confined to 1st, 2nd, 3rd and 4th avenues, as well as adjacent sections of the cross streets, and mainly north of Hanson Street (third street south of Main). The remainder of the downtown is primarily residential.

Parks Canada maintains the S.S. Klondike national historic site in the southeast corner of downtown next to Second Avenue and the river; just to its north is Rotary Peace Park; together, these properties historically were squatter areas cleared in the late 1960s, known as Whiskey Flats South.

North of this along the river were the waterfront properties most of which were concerns of the White Pass and Yukon Route railway until 1986, when railway interest in retaining these properties waned; most of it is now owned by the city and the territorial government which are focusing on making the area a public area with some businesses and trails; it also has the "waterfront trolley" operating through the area. Beyond the present extent of Front Street (1st Avenue), there was a second squatter area known as Whiskey Flats North extending to the approximate location of the Wal-Mart store built in 2000; part of this was also where riverboats were moored in the winter, and where two riverboats were lost to fire in 1974.

== Transportation ==
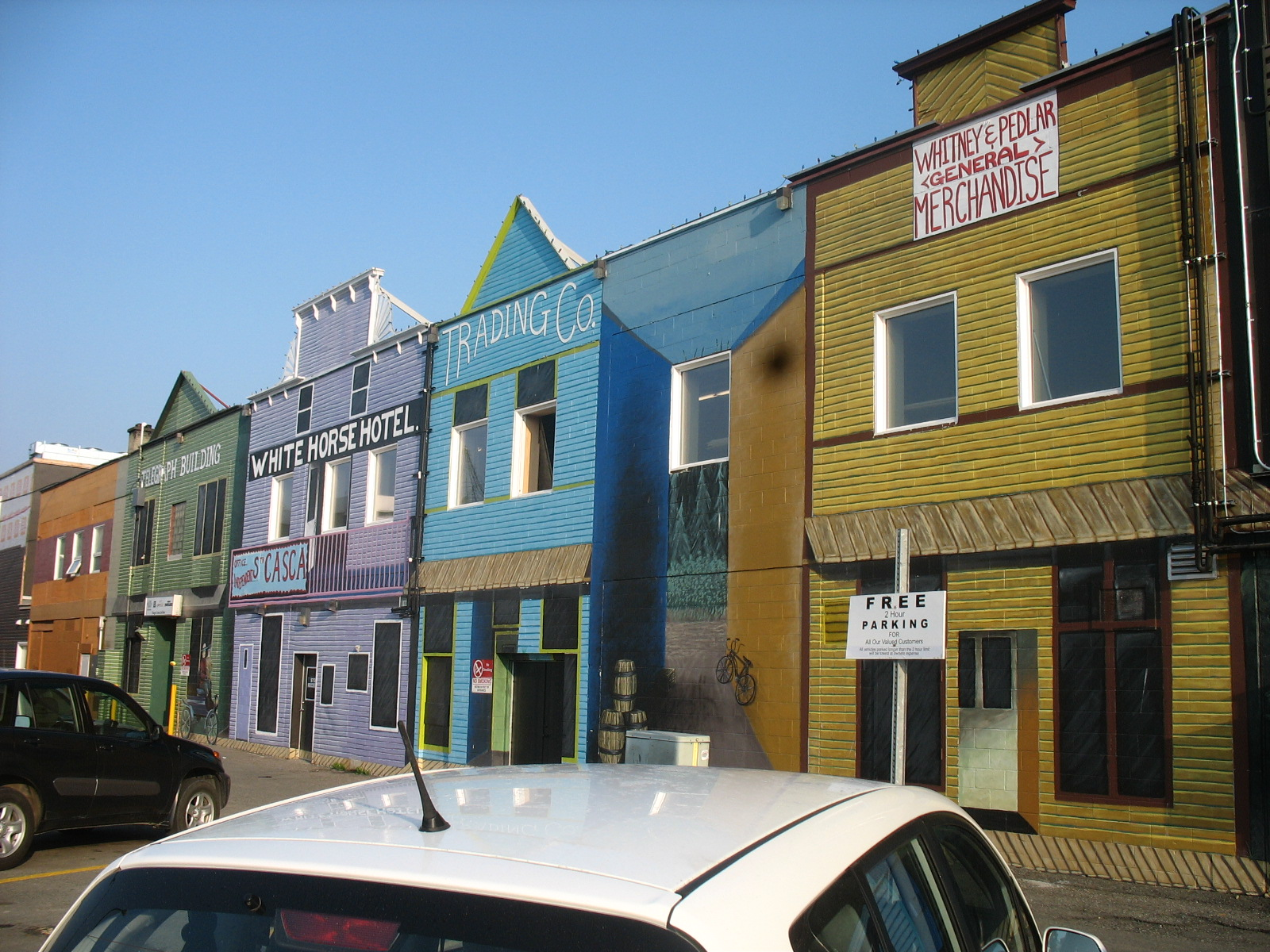
Storefronts on Elliott Street. The street is a major east–west thoroughfare in Downtown Whitehorse.

As well as the numbered avenues 2nd, 3rd, 4th, 5th, 6th, 7th and 8th and the parallel Front Street (officially known for many years as 1st Avenue), the named streets delineate addresses along the avenues.
