= Whitehorse General Hospital =

Hospital in Whitehorse, Yukon, Canada

- Yukon Hospital Corporation

Geography
- Location: 5 Hospital Rd., Whitehorse, Yukon, Canada
- Coordinates: 60.7193°N 135.0436°E

Organization
- Care system: Medicare (Canada)

Services
- Emergency department: Yes
- Beds: 56

History
- Opened: January 1901

Links
- Website: Official website
- Lists: Hospitals in Canada

Whitehorse General Hospital is a hospital in Whitehorse, Yukon. It is the biggest hospital in the Yukon, providing 24/7 emergency care, inpatient and ambulatory care, surgical services, cancer care, psychiatric, visiting specialists clinics, therapy and lab services, and advanced diagnostic imaging. A new wing containing an emergency department was opened in January 2018. In the years preceding the opening of the new ward the hospital's Emergency Department saw roughly 33,000 visitors annually.

The hospital and territory have historically been criticized for not offering dialysis services in the territory.

== Facilities ==
Whitehorse General Hospital offers community services such as:

- 24/7 Emergency Services
- Inpatient and ambulatory care
- Surgery
- Cancer care
- Visiting specialist clinic
- Medical rehabilitation
- Laboratory Services
- Radiology
- First Nations Health Programs
