= Yukon Legislative Building =

Legislative building in Yukon, Canada

Coordinates: 60.7169°N 135.0488°W

Yukon Legislative Building (Yukon Government Administration Building)
- Interactive map of the Yukon Legislative Building (Yukon Government Administration Building) area

General information
- Architectural style: Postmodern
- Location: Whitehorse, Canada
- Client: Government of Yukon

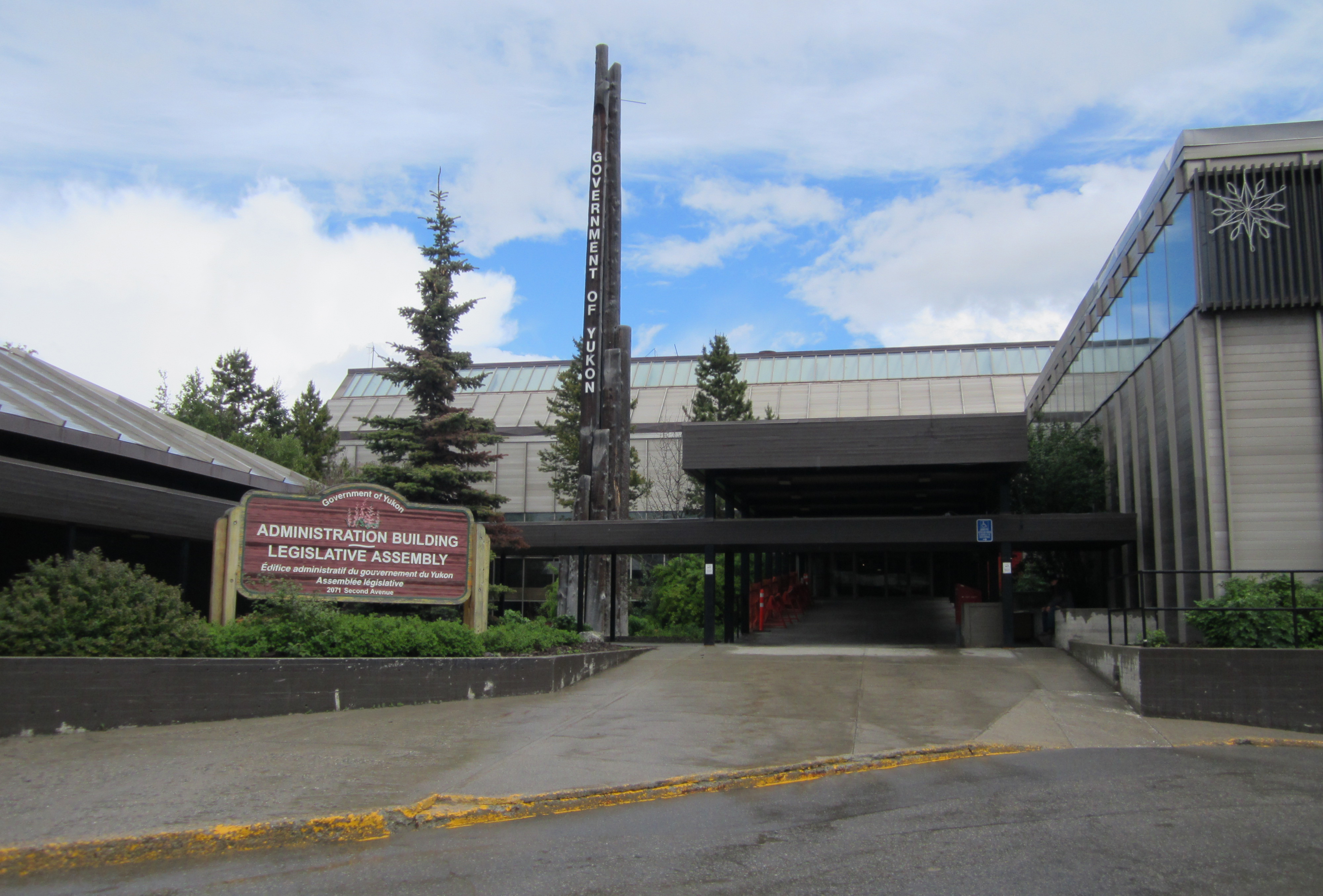
Yukon Legislative Building entrance

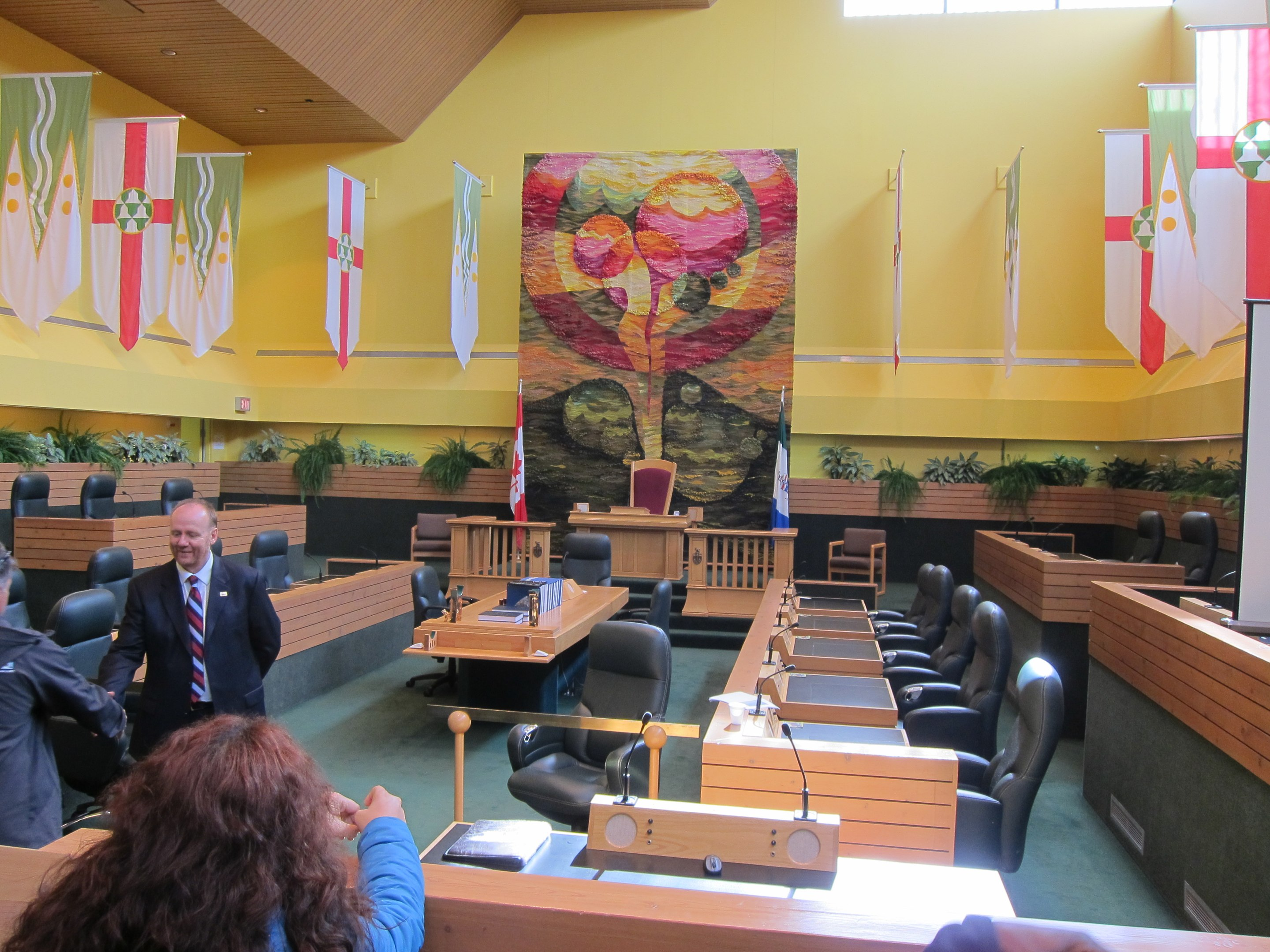
Yukon Legislative Assembly

The Yukon Legislative Building is home to the Yukon Legislative Assembly. Located in Whitehorse, Yukon, the building is a three-storey white steel-clad structure. The complex is located next to the Yukon River and Rotary Park.

== History ==
Before relocating to Whitehorse, the legislature met at the Yukon Territorial Government Administration Building in Dawson City from 1907 to 1953 (now home to a satellite campus of Yukon University). From 1953 to 1976 the Legislature sat in Whitehorse, first at the Old Post Office (Government Services Building built in 1901 and demolished in 1962), then in the Federal Building (demolished in 1990s), then in the Lynn Building on Steele Street. In 1976, the legislature moved to its current location in the new territorial administration building which was opened on May 25, by Jules Léger, the Governor-General of Canada.

In October 2022, Deputy Premier Tracy-Anne McPhee, the Commissioner of Yukon Angélique Bernard presided at a ceremony naming the structure in honor of Jim Smith, the territory's longest-serving Commissioner, to recognize his contributions to the government. Members of Smith's family attended the ceremony.

== Tenants ==
The building houses most of Yukon Government's departments and is the home of the Legislature Assembly. Both the Legislative Assembly and Executive Council sit in the same chamber.
