= Yukon University =

Public university in the Yukon, Canada

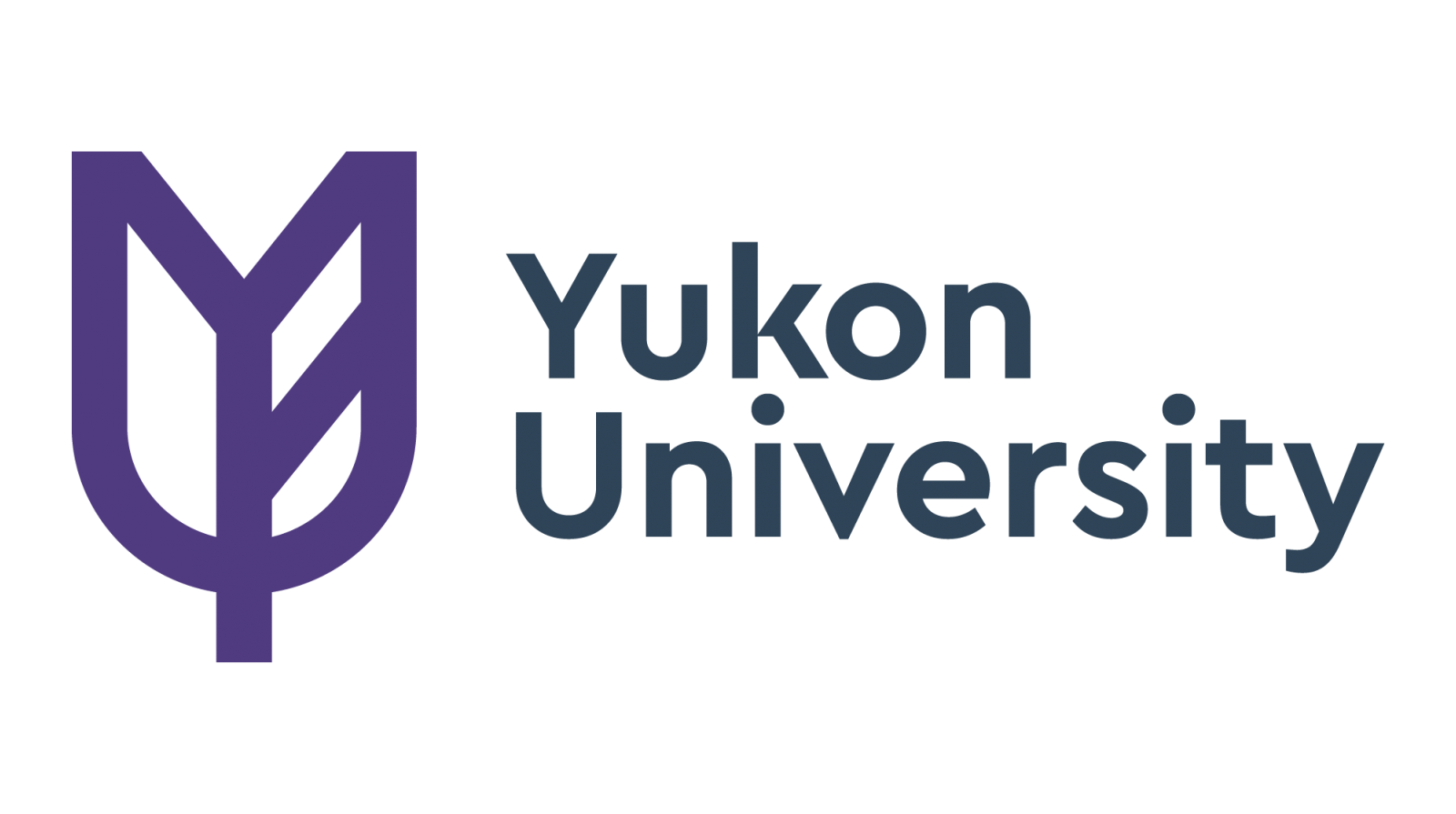
- Former names: Yukon College (1988–2020); Yukon Vocational and Training Centre (1965-1988); Whitehorse Vocational and Technical Training Centre (1963-1965)
- Type: Public
- Established: 1988; 38 years ago (Note: The following year was when the institution was formally established as Yukon College, under the College Act, 1988. However, the institution traces its origins to the Whitehorse Vocational and Technical Training Centre established in 1963. Yukon College was eventually reorganized into a university in 2020.)
- Affiliations: BCCAT, CCAA, CBIE, CICan, UArctic
- Endowment: CA$2.72 million (2019)
- Chancellor: Carol Geddes
- President: Shelagh Rowles (interim)
- Administrative staff: 220
- Students: 1,285
- Location: 500 University Drive; Whitehorse, Yukon, Canada; Y1A 5K4; 60°45′1.20″N 135°5′55.49″W
- Campus: Suburban & rural
- Colours: Plum and teal
- Website: www.yukonu.ca

Yukon University (formerly Yukon College) is a public university in the Canadian territory of Yukon. The university's main campus is based in Whitehorse, although the institution also operates 12 campuses throughout the territory. The university confers bachelor's degrees, diplomas, certificates as well as trades and vocational training and adult basic education. The institution is currently the only university based in northern Canada.

The institution traces its origins to the Whitehorse Vocational and Technical Training Centre established in 1963; it was renamed as the Yukon Vocational and Training Centre in 1965. The institution operated as a post-secondary education centre, providing vocational training for its students. During the 1980s, the institution was reorganized as a college. The institution operated as Yukon College until the institution was reorganized into a university in 2020, the first university in any of Canada's northern territories.

== History ==
The institution originates from the Whitehorse Vocational and Technical Training Centre (renamed the Yukon Vocational and Technical Training Centre in 1965). The institution changed its name to Yukon College in 1983, although it was not formally designated as a college until 1988, with the passage of the College Act, 1988. The institution opened its new campus, 2 kilometres (1.2 mi) from its original location on the bank of the Yukon River in the suburb of Riverdale in the same year. In 1989, the College Act was amended, providing the college with an independent Board of Governors.

During the late 1980s and 1990s, the institution began to offer several degree programs in partnership with the University of Alberta, and the University of Regina. During this period, the institution also opened several satellite campuses in a number of First Nations communities. The Northern Research Centre (later renamed the Yukon Research Centre in 2009, and since 2020 named the YukonU Research Centre) was established in 1990 for the purposes of researching mine reclamation, cold climate construction, and climate change.

Efforts to reorganize the institution into a university began with the Government of Yukon in 2011, with its reorganization into a university listed in the college's 2013 and 2016 strategic plans. In 2016, the college was admitted as a member of the BC Association of Institutes and Universities, an institution that represents eight post-secondary institutions in British Columbia, as well as Yukon College. In 2018, the college created its first degree program specialized for the territory, a Bachelor of Arts in Indigenous governance.

In November 2019, the Yukon University Act was passed, resulting in the college's reorganization into a post-secondary university, with the legislation going into effect on 20 February 2020. The following legislation established a bicameral governance structure for the institution, establishing a new board of governors, and replaced the college's academic council with the university senate. As a result of its reorganization, the institution's logo and colours were changed as well. Plans were in place to commemorate its reorganization into a university in May 2020, although several events were cancelled as a result of safety measures taken during the COVID-19 pandemic.

== Campus ==
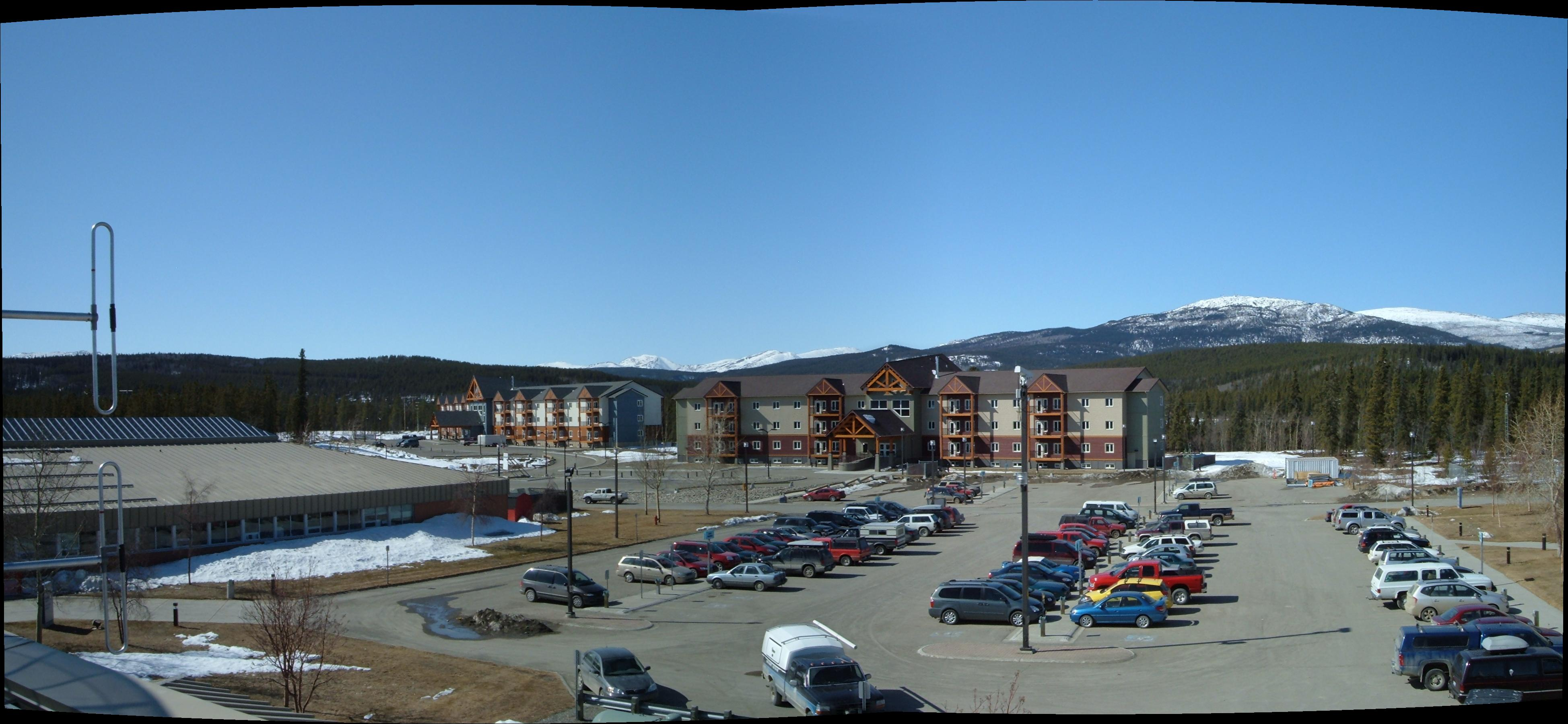
Panorama from Yukon University roof in 2007

The university's main campus, also referred to as Ayamdigut, is located 4 kilometres (2.5 mi) north of downtown Whitehorse, situated on a plateau that slopes 20–25 metres (66–82 ft) to the east, south, and west. The campus property is 97 hectares (240 acres), although most areas outside the central core of the property remains undeveloped. In particular, the areas adjacent to McIntyre Creek is zoned for environmental protection by the municipal government.

The property itself is bounded to the west by McIntyre Creek, to the northeast by Mountain View Drive, to the southeast by University Drive and the Whitehorse Correctional Centre, and the residential neighbourhood of Takhini to the south. The property is surrounded by several other residential neighbourhoods, including the Northlands Trailer Park, and Whistle Bend, although the core of the campus remains geographically isolated from these neighbourhoods. The main campus may be accessed through University Drive, which diverges westward from the main road, and climbs steadily towards the campus. Institutions adjacent to the campus include the Yukon Archives and the Yukon Arts Centre.

=== Housing and student facilities ===
The majority of the university's residential buildings are located on the western periphery of the developed part of the property.

=== Off-campus facilities ===
In addition to Ayamdigut campus in Whitehorse, the university also has smaller campuses in the communities of Faro, Teslin, Watson Lake, Mayo, Ross River, Pelly Crossing, Carmacks, Haines Junction, Carcross, Old Crow, and Dawson City. There is also a campus within the Whitehorse Correctional Centre.

== Administration ==
The governance of the university is conducted through the board of governors, and the university senate, both of which were established in the Yukon University Act. The board of governors is responsible for governing and managing the university and convenes once a month. The board of governors includes members from the university administration, faculty, staff, student body. The board also includes 10 members appointed by the Commissioner in Executive Council, three of whom must come from a Yukon First Nations community, and three who reside outside of Whitehorse. Board members are appointed to three-year terms, which may be renewed. The university's board of governors originated as Yukon College's board of governors, and its membership was expanded to include 17 members after the institution became a university.

Prior to its reorganization into a university, the institution's academic policies were maintained by the college's Academic Council. However, in 2020, the university senate was created to assume the role of the Academic Council, maintaining academic policies including standards for admission and qualifications for degrees, diplomas, and certificates issued by the university. Members of the university senate includes members from the school's faculty, student body, and administration. The Yukon University Act stipulates that 60 per cent of the senate's membership must be made up of faculty members. The university attempts to maintain a senate composition where 30 per cent of its membership originates from various indigenous communities across the territory, and Canada, although this is not required under the Yukon University Act.

The university is headed by the president and vice-chancellor, who acts as the university's chief executive officer, although the chancellor serves as the ceremonial head of the institution.

=== Chancellors ===
- Pierre Berton (1989–1993)
- T’aaḵú Tláa, Tlingit name of Pearl Keenan (1993–2000)
- Ken MacKinnon (2000–2004)
- Sam Johnston (2004–2008)
- Rolf Hougen (2008–2012)
- Geraldine Van Bibber (2012–2016)
- Piers McDonald (2016–2020)
- Jamena, Dän k’e or Southern Tutchone name of James Allen (2020–2024)
- Carol Geddes (2024–2028)

=== Presidents and vice-chancellors ===
- Karen Barnes (2011–2020) founding president after it was reorganized into a university
- Mike DeGagné, (2021)
- Maggie Matear (2021); interim
- Lesley Brown (2021–2025)
- Shelagh Rowles (2025–present); interim

=== Finances ===
Between June 2018 and June 2019, the university's revenues totaled C$50,741,951, while its expenses totaled C$50,734,978, yielding a surplus of C$6,973. Contributions from the Government of Yukon make up the largest source of revenue for the university. Salaries for direct instruction is the largest expense for the university, with the university spending approximately C$16.1 million that year. During the 2018–19 year, the university spent approximately C$4.47 million on research. As of June 2019, the university had an endowment valued at approximately C$2.72 million.

== Academics ==
Yukon University is a publicly-funded institution that operates as a "hybrid" university, serving as a research hub and offering degree programs, while also providing vocational training and trades programs typically found in Canadian colleges. The university is a member of Colleges and Institutes Canada, and is in the process of applying for membership with Universities Canada.

Yukon University offers certificates, diplomas and degrees through six academic areas - the School of Academic and Skill Development, School of Science, School of Trades, Technology and Mining, School of Health, Education and Human Services, School of Liberal Arts, and the School of Business and Leadership. Bachelor's degrees are offered in Business Administration, Education, Indigenous Governance, Northern Environmental and Conservation Sciences, and Social Work.

Academic programs at the university allow Yukoners to stay in the north while pursuing post-secondary studies. It also accommodates contract training demands by local industry and government in a range of specialties. Programming is delivered from campus to campus, across Yukon, through locally delivered courses and on-line learning technology. The President's Committee on First Nation Initiatives, with representatives from all fourteen Yukon First Nations, influences programming and services delivered at the university.

With respect to research and development, the university is home to the Yukon Research Centre, which is engaged in biodiversity monitoring and climate change research. It is also home to the Yukon Strategy for Patient Oriented Research (YSPOR).

=== Partnership ===
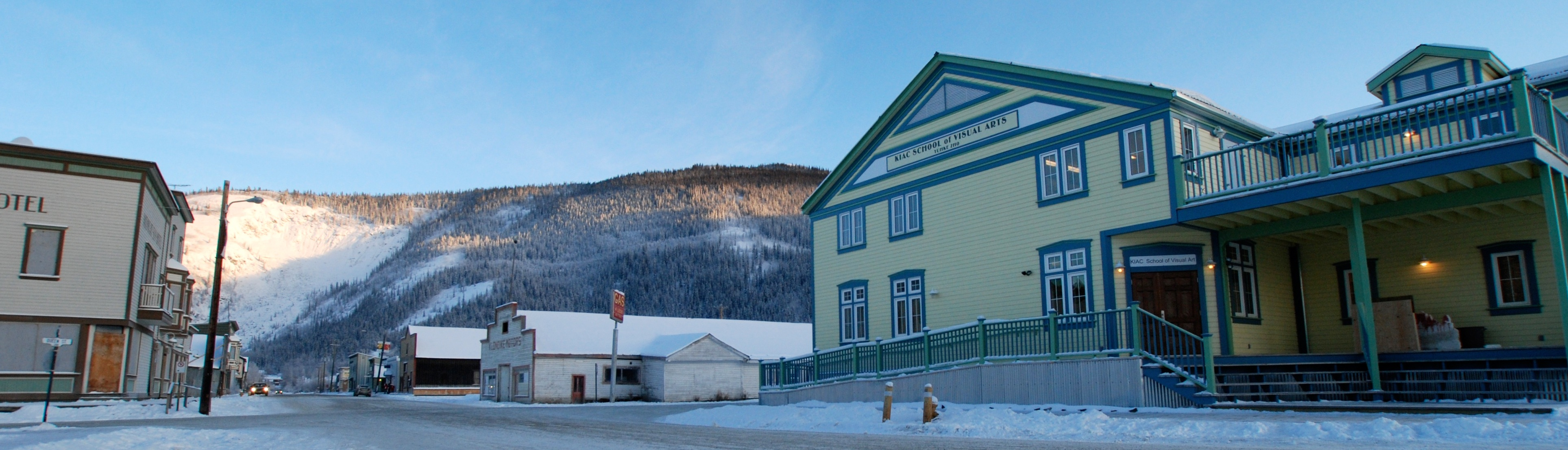
Exterior of the Yukon School of Visual Arts, an art school the university jointly operates with two other organizations.

Yukon University operates a fine arts post-secondary school known as the Yukon School of Visual Arts, in collaboration with the Dawson City Art Society, and the Trʼondëk Hwëchʼin First Nation.

The university participates in the international University of the Arctic network and cooperates with several universities to deliver programming, including the University of Alberta, the University of Regina, the University of British Columbia, and the University of Alaska Southeast. The university participates in UArctic’s mobility program north2north. The aim of that program is to enable students of member institutions to study in different parts of the North.

== Notable people ==
- Dawn Macdonald, poet
- Gurdeep Pandher, author, teacher, and performer
- John Streicker, artist, politician, and engineer

== See also ==
- Higher education in Yukon
- List of universities in Canada
