= Joseph Ladue =

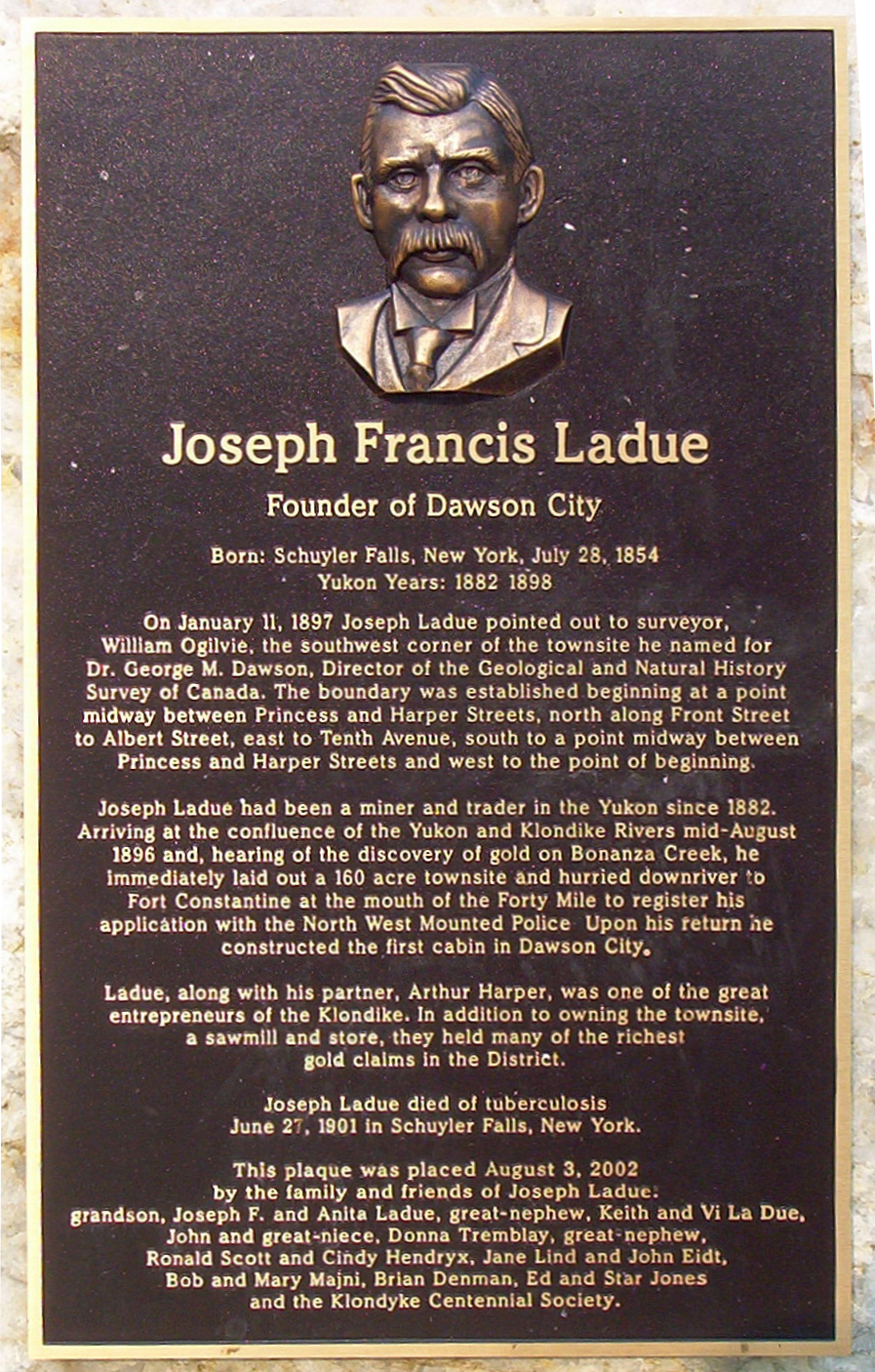
Joseph Ladue plaque

Joseph Francis Ladue (July 28, 1855 – June 27, 1901) was an American prospector, businessman and founder of Dawson City, Yukon, Canada.

Ladue was born in Schuyler Falls, New York. His mother died when he was seven years old, and his father in 1874. Upon his father's death, 19-year-old Joe headed west.

In 1876, he found employment in a gold mine in Deadwood, South Dakota, beginning as a general labourer and working his way up to engineer, foreman and superintendent. He eventually quit to go prospecting in Arizona and New Mexico, but did not strike it rich. In 1882, he crossed the Chilkoot Pass into the interior of the Yukon, where he prospected and traded for a couple of years.

In August 1896, a few days after the discovery of gold in the Klondike, he staked a claim to either 160 or 178 acres (65-72 hectares) of boggy flats at the mouth of the Klondike River as a townsite. In January 1897, he named the new town Dawson after Canadian geologist George Mercer Dawson. By July, about 5000 people lived there. Ladue could sell town lots for as much as $5000 or $8000. He relocated his saw mill to Dawson; it ran continuously night and day in response to the extreme demand. He also set up a store and the first saloon in town. In addition, he acquired a number of rich gold claims. All this enabled Ladue to leave the north a rich man that year.

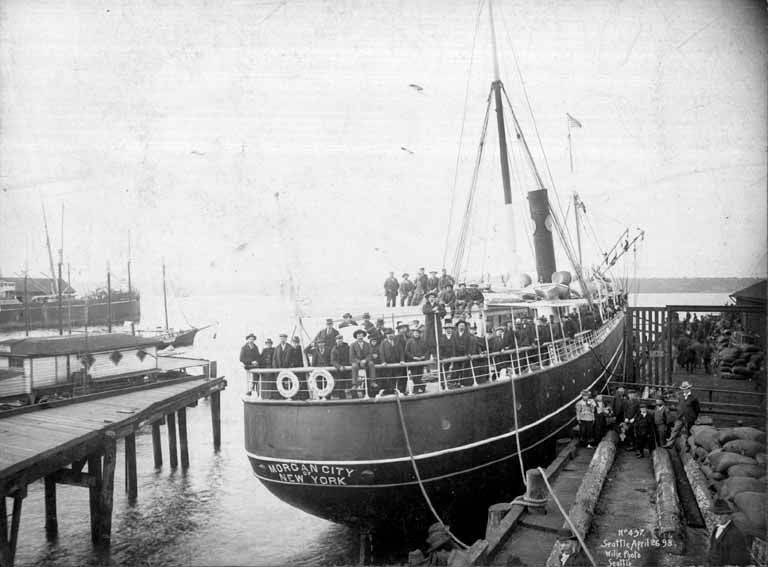
SS Morgan City leaving Seattle for Alaska, April 26, 1898

With some of his wealth, Ladue bought the steamer SS Morgan City and had it brought around Cape Horn from New York City. After a single trip from Seattle to Skagway and Valdez he leased it at $600 per day as a troop transport to the Philippines. The ship was lost in the Sea of Japan in September 1899.

Ladue returned to his home town and on December 15, 1897, he married Anna "Kitty" Mason. He was in poor health and died of "consumption" (tuberculosis) at Schuyler Falls on June 27, 1901. He was survived by his wife and a son.
