= Yukon School of Visual Arts =

Fine arts school in Dawson City, Canada

Coordinates: 64°03′45″N 139°25′50″W

Yukon School of Visual Arts (SOVA)
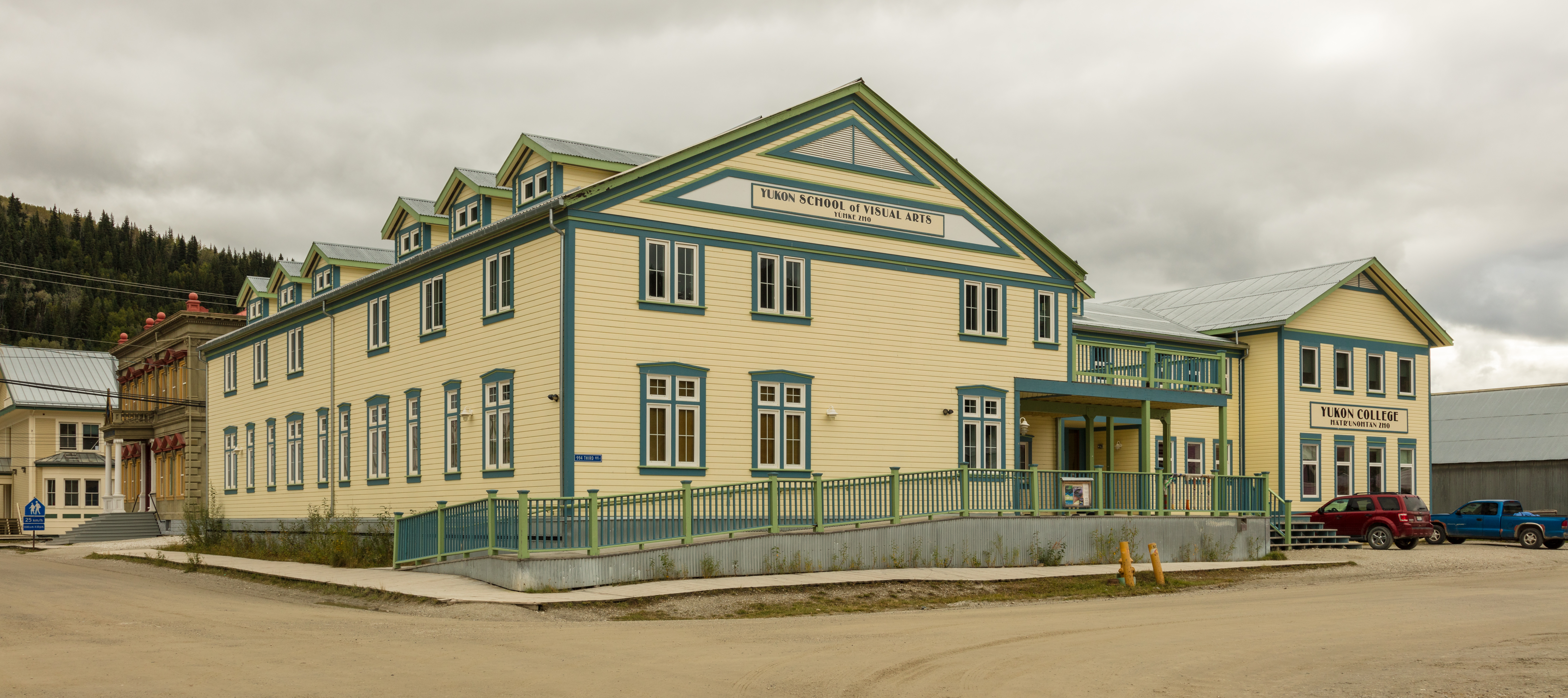
- Type: Public Art and Design School
- Established: 2007
- Affiliations: OCAD, ECIAD, ACAD, NSCAD, MtA
- Location: Dawson City, Yukon, Canada
- Partners: Dawson City Arts Society, Yukon University, Tr'ondek Hwech'in
- Website: www.yukonsova.ca

The Yukon School of Visual Arts (SOVA) is Canada's most northerly post-secondary fine arts school, and it receives its accreditation through the Applied Arts Division of Yukon University. SOVA offers a Foundation Year Program, which is the equivalent of the first year of a Bachelor of Fine Arts (BFA) degree. The school offers an experimental, integrated curriculum that is studio-based with liberal arts courses. Successful students continue their degrees at their choice of five partnering art schools across Canada, including the Ontario College of Art and Design in Toronto, the Emily Carr Institute of Art and Design in Vancouver, the Alberta College of Art and Design in Calgary, Mount Allison University in Sackville, NB and the Nova Scotia College of Art and Design University in Halifax.

SOVA was founded by the Dawson City Arts Society (DCAS). It is a partnership between DCAS, Yukon University, and Tr'ondek Hwech'in. Each founding organisation has equal representation on the governing council. Yukon School of Visual Arts changed its name from KIAC School of Visual Arts in the Fall of 2010 to avoid confusion between the school and the community arts organisation KIAC.

== Location ==
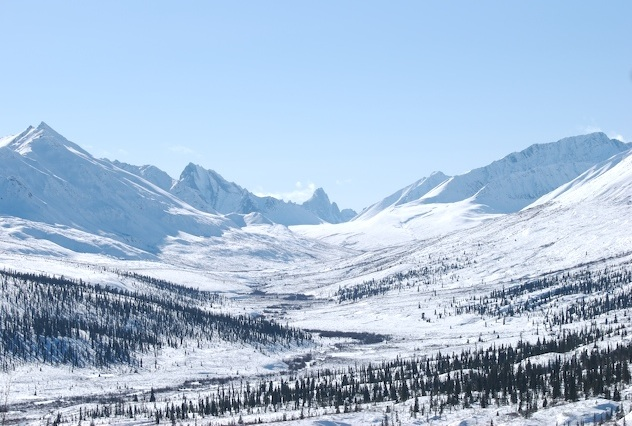
Tombstone Mountains in March

YSOVA is located in Dawson City, an extremely remote location with a rich history. Home to the Han people for millennia, at the turn of the 20th Century Dawson City became the centre of the Klondike Goldrush and was suddenly the largest city north of San Francisco and west of Winnipeg at the time. Today, the town is home to many national historic sites, a self-governing First Nation, an active mining industry, and a diverse international community. During the summer months, tourism reaches a peak of 60,000 annual visitors, providing a major source of revenue for the town. The border of Alaska is only a few kilometres away to the west, and the Tombstone Mountains are only 45 minutes north along the Dempster Highway en route to the Beaufort Sea.

== Curriculum ==
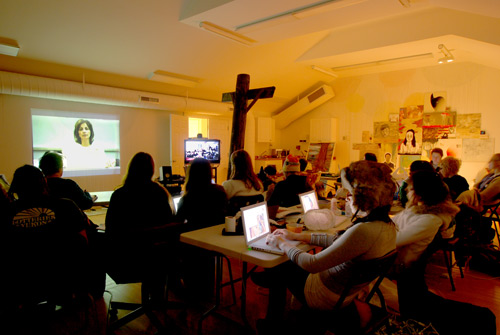
Students from SOVA video conferencing with people from OCAD University

The curriculum includes studio classes in 2D, 3D, and 4D (new media), as well as liberal arts classes in English and Visual Culture Studies.

== Facilities ==
The school is located in a 7,800-square-foot (720 m^{2}) historic building in downtown Dawson City. This two-story structure was custom designed specifically for the needs of the foundation year program with studio facilities, a lecture room, a media lab, indoor/outdoor common areas, woodshop, a library and digital resource centre, a student gallery and an art supplies store. Laptop computers and a digital still camera are assigned to each student for use in both their academic and studio coursework, and wireless internet is available throughout the facility.

== KIAC & YSOVA ==
The Klondike Institute for Arts and Culture (KIAC) is a community-based arts centre offering a rotating schedule of workshops, screenings, festivals, exhibitions, and non-accredited courses. YSOVA is a post-secondary institution offering accredited courses and articulation agreements with colleges and universities across Canada.

Closely associated, but different organisations, YSOVA and KIAC mutually support resident artists, special events, and facilities.

KIAC is located on 2nd and Princess in the ODD Fellows Hall. YSOVA is located on 3rd and Queen.

== Over The Wire ==
Over the Wire is a project series. Each semester, a set of instructions created by a distant Artist is delivered to the students in order to produce a new work. The students in turn interpret the instructions and create the work locally for exhibition. In addition to the exhibition of the work, each project is archived by a publication or multiple that is distributed in return across the country.

Over the Wire artists:

- Tim Hecker: Sonic Palimpsests. (multiple: Audio CD).
- Shary Boyle: Anthropomorphic Mother. (multiple: Book).
- Gary Hill: The Highcoo of Synaesthesia. (multiple: DVD).
- Iain Baxter&: Sense of Place Guide.
- Lawrence Weiner: A Translation from One Language to Another.
- Simparch + Deborah Stratman: Habitual Suspects.
- The Center for Land Use Interpretation: Dawson City: Mining the Interpretive Realm of the Klondike.

Over the Wire is a pedagogical art project created by SOVA faculty member Charles Stankievech.

== See also ==
- Higher education in Yukon
