= Higher education in Yukon =

Tertiary institutions in Yukon, Canada

Territory of Yukon

Higher education in Yukon is shaped by the territory's small population (40,717 people as of Dec. 2018) in a relatively large geographic area. The history of higher education went hand in hand with the establishment of a representative territorial government in 1979. Yukon University is the only higher education institution in Yukon. Yukon University issues certificate, diploma, and degree programs. In December, 2019, the Yukon Legislature passed a bill that would transform Yukon College into Yukon University.

== History ==
Although the Yukon University wasn't formally established until 1988 by the College Act, 1988, its predecessor, the Whitehorse Vocational Training School (later to become the Yukon Vocational and Technical Training Centre), opened in 1963 with a focus on teaching skills that enabled adults to gain employment. In 1977 the territorial government made arrangements with the University of British Columbia to offer a one-time university-level Yukon Teacher Education Program.

The birth of Yukon University in 1983 was due to public demand for further education and training opportunities within the territory.

In 2007, and as part of Yukon University, the Yukon School of Visual Arts was established to provide the foundational year of a Bachelor of Fine Arts (BFA) or a Bachelor of Design (BDes). The school is a partnership between Dawson City Arts Society, Yukon University and the Tr’ondek Hwech’in and its credential is conferred by Yukon University. Governance comes from all three partners and funding comes from the Yukon Government. Articulation agreements are in place with ECUAD, ACAD, OCAD, and NSCAD.

In December, 2019, the Yukon Legislature passed a bill that would transform Yukon College into Yukon University.

== Structure and governance ==
=== Yukon University governance ===
"The board of governors of Yukon University holds fiduciary responsibility for the institution and management of the operations, including policies that relate to quality assurance. The Yukon College Act also establishes campus advisory committees to advise the board of governors on the programs and activities of the community campus, with particular reference to the needs of the community. The board of governors is accountable to the minister of education. The minister tables the board's report with the Legislature."

== Future directions and challenges ==
Yukon University is a founding member of the University of the Arctic, "a cooperative network of universities, colleges, research institutes and other organizations concerned with education and research in and about the North." Preparations for university transition have been underway since 2012 and more formally since somewhat before 2015 with an anticipated launch date of Spring 2020. This is despite the fact that northern residents and southern academics have been suggesting it since the early 1960s, an attempt was made to establish a university in Yukon and the Northwest Territories in the 1970s, the Science Council of Canada urged its establishment as early as the mid 1970s, and Yukoners have proposed the college become a university in some form or other since 2004. In December, 2019, the Yukon Legislature passed a bill that would transform Yukon College into Yukon University. The university officially opened in May, 2020, making Yukon University the only public university in the north.

== See also ==
- List of universities in Canada
- List of colleges in Canada
- List of business schools in Canada
- List of law schools in Canada
- List of Canadian universities by endowment
- Higher education in Canada
