= Karen Barnes =

Canadian academic

Academic background
- Education: University of British Columbia; University of Alberta
- Thesis: Alberta's public colleges 1992-2002: responding to the campus Alberta policy framework (2003)

Karen Elaine Barnes is a Canadian academic. Barnes was the founding president and holds the title of president emerita at Yukon University.

== Education ==
Barns earned her Bachelor of Arts and Professional After Degree in Education from the University of British Columbia and both her Masters (1993) and Doctorate in Education (2003) from the University of Alberta.

== Career ==
Barnes spent 17 years at NorQuest College in Edmonton, beginning in 1986, before moving to Lethbridge College in Alberta, where she served as Dean of Arts and Science from 2002 to 2008.

In 2008, Barnes was hired as a Vice-President at Yukon College. During this period she was active nationally with the Association of Canadian Community Colleges, including chairing its Calgary conference program committee and serving on national teaching and staff award juries and as faculty for its Leadership Development Institute for Deans and Directors. At Yukon College, she developed new diplomas and degree programs and was involved in establishing the college's School of Mining.

Barnes has held several appointments related to Northern and post-secondary education policy. She served on the board of the Mining Industry Human Resource Council of Canada and chaired the governing committees for the Yukon Research Centre and the Northern Institute of Social Justice. Barnes was appointed to the Saskatchewan Higher Education Quality Assurance Board, where she served as vice-chair from 2012 until 2018.

In 2018, she was appointed to the Board of Directors of the University of the Arctic in Norway. In November 2020, she was appointed to the board of Polar Knowledge Canada by the Government of Canada. She has also chaired an expert panel on High-Throughput Networks for Rural and Remote Communities for the Council of Canadian Academies and served on selection committees for the Pierre Elliott Trudeau Foundation's Scholars, Mentors and Fellows program. In 2020, she received a Distinguished Alumni Award from the University of Alberta.

Barnes is a founding member of 100 Women Who Care – Whitehorse and has volunteered with the Yukon Imagination Library and as assistant vice-president of sponsorship for the 2012 and 2020 Arctic Winter Games.

=== Presidency of Yukon University ===
In 2011, Barnes was selected to become president of Yukon College. As president, Barnes oversaw the decade-long process of transforming Yukon College into Yukon University to reflect the institution's development into research activity, which was formally established in 2020. In 2017, the university underwent a post-secondary quality assessment conducted by the University of Alberta, evaluating student satisfaction, governance, and academic and program quality, which it passed against national standards.

Barnes also worked to strengthen the university's relationship with Yukon First Nations, building on earlier work in Alberta on culturally specific delivery of post-secondary education to Indigenous communities. Under her leadership, the university introduced a mandatory Yukon First Nations 101 course for staff and students, expanded its First Nations department, and grew its Indigenous programming and advisory structures. She established a First Nations Advisory Group with the Council of Yukon First Nations and nation chiefs. She also co-chaired the Colleges and Institutes Canada committee that developed the Indigenous Protocol for Canadian Colleges and Institutes.

After her retirement in 2020, Barnes was named president emerita of Yukon University by its Board of Governors, the first person to receive the designation at the university.
