= Westminster Hotel =

Hotel in Dawson City, Yukon, Canada

Coordinates: 64°03′41″N 139°26′01″W

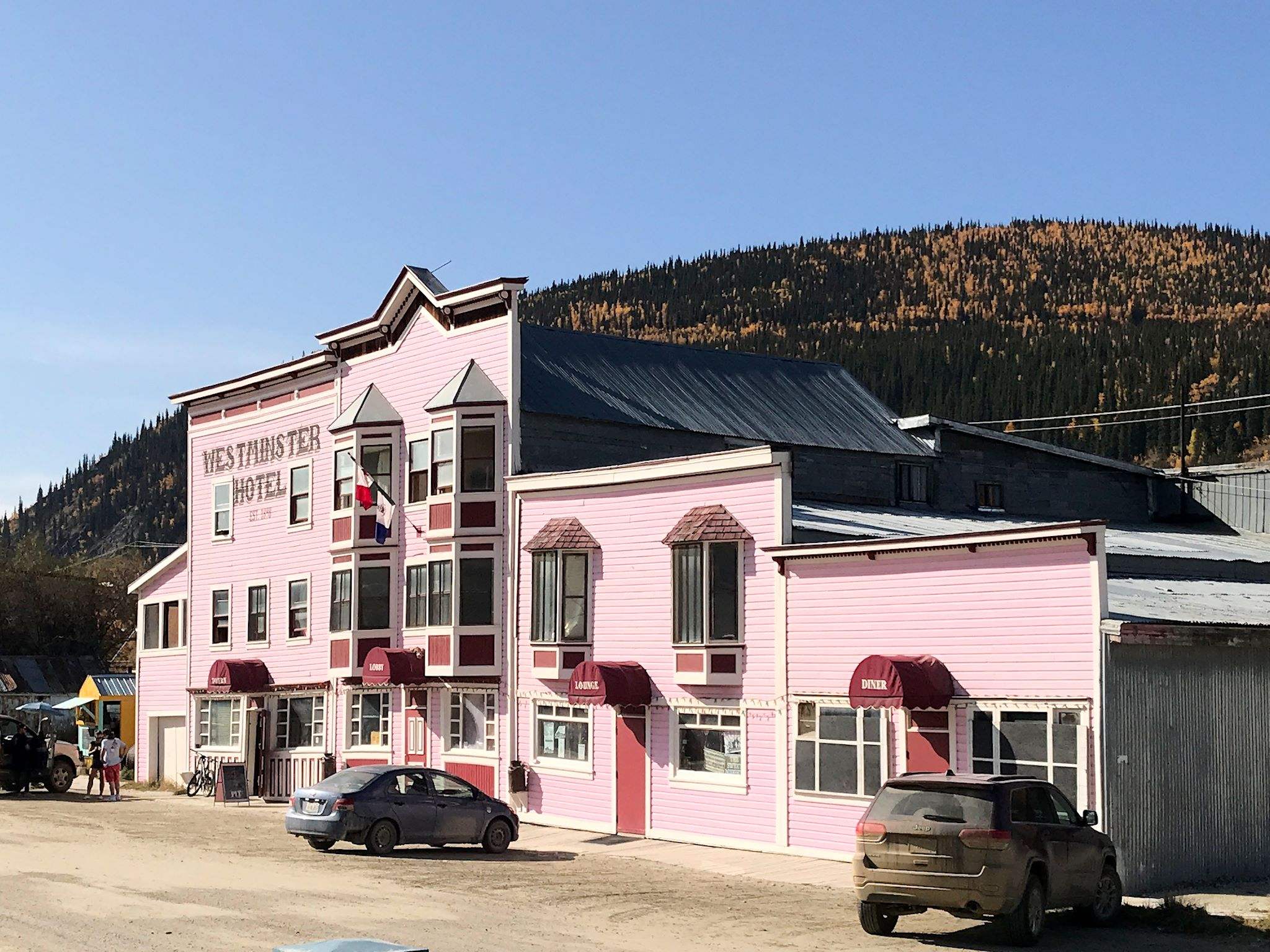
Westminster Hotel in 2019

Westminster Hotel colloquially known as The Pit was a tavern and hotel in Dawson City, Yukon, Canada.

The hotel was a Klondike Gold Rush era building built in 1898.

The building was closed in January 2026 after a water main broke during a deep freeze causing a flood. On May 17, 2026, a fire destroyed the building and razed it to the ground.
