= Downtown Hotel =

Building in Yukon, Canada

Coordinates: 64°03′44″N 139°26′00″W

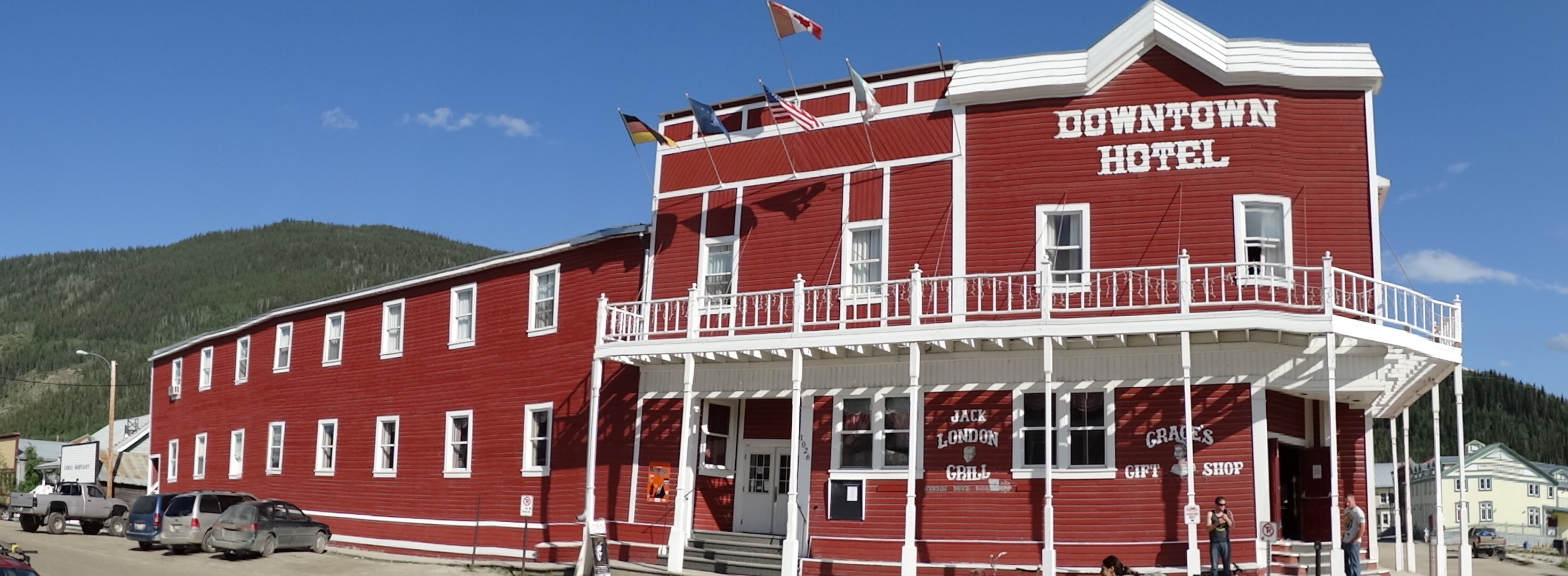
Downtown Hotel in 2013

The Downtown Hotel is an establishment at Second Avenue and Queen Street in Dawson City, Yukon, Canada. It contains 59 rooms.

== History ==
Contrary to popular belief, the current hotel structure was not built in the late 1890s Gold Rush because great fires, storms and flooding have weathered away any previous buildings. The current structure was built in Gold Rush boomtown style in the early 1980s, conforming to modern city building codes and catering to modern tourism.

== Sourtoe cocktail ==
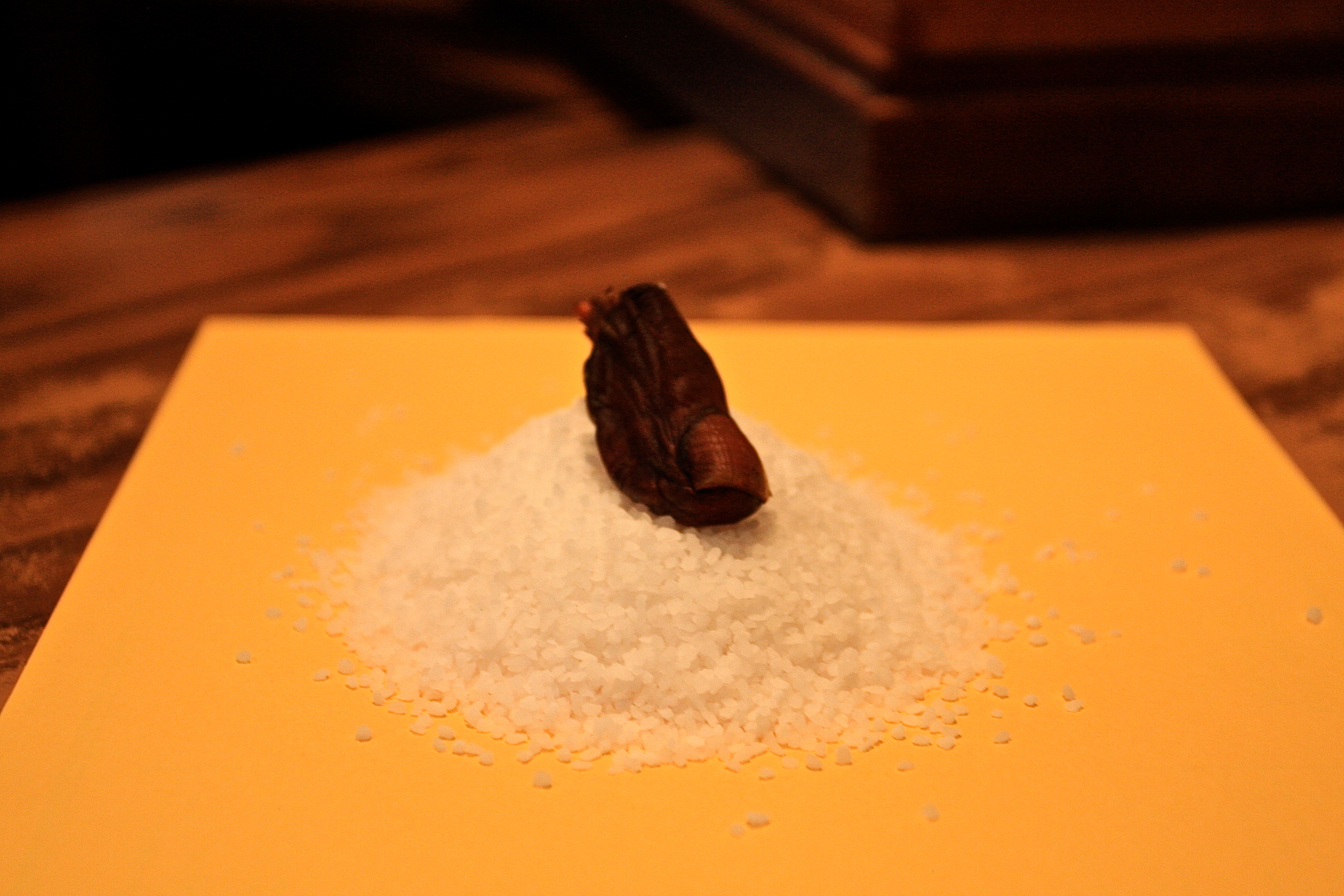
The mummified toe used in the drink

The hotel has gained notoriety for its Sourtoe cocktail. The Sourtoe cocktail began during Prohibition with a case of frostbite. In the 1920s, two outlaw brothers, Louie and Otto, were caught in a blizzard. Louie soaked his foot, and when the brothers got back to their cabin, Louie's foot was frostbitten with his right toe becoming gangrenous. Otto amputated it, and placed it in a jar filled with bourbon to commemorate the event. The drink tradition was established by riverboat captain Dick Stevenson in 1973.

To gain admittance to a club of drinkers of the Sourtoe cocktail, members must drink the cocktail and the lips of the participant must touch the toe. Participants are presented with a signed certificate; however, ingesting the toe results in a $2,500 fine and permanent barring from the premises, up from $500 from when a guest deliberately ingested it in 2013, proactively paying the fine and unremorsefully shocking the bartender. Over 100,000 customers have tried the concoction to date, as of 2023. Bartender Terry Lee says they would like to have another toe donated, because several toes have been damaged, stolen, swallowed or lost over the span of decades.
