= Dawn Macdonald =

Canadian writer (born 20th century)

Dawn Macdonald (born 20th century) is a Canadian writer from Whitehorse, Yukon, who won the Canadian First Book Prize from the Griffin Poetry Prize for her debut poetry collection Northerny in 2025.

She is an institutional researcher at Yukon University.

== See also ==
- List of Canadian poets
- List of people from Yukon
