= Dawson City =

- Town
- City of Dawson
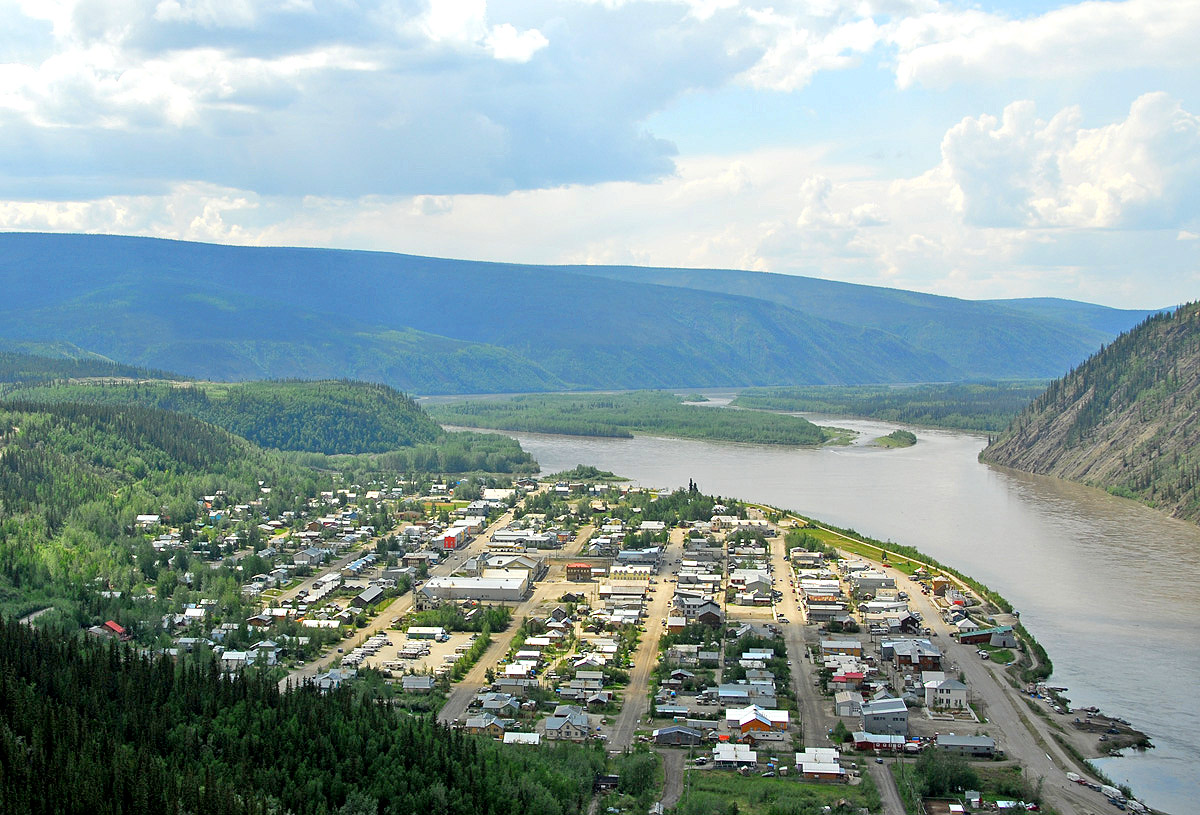
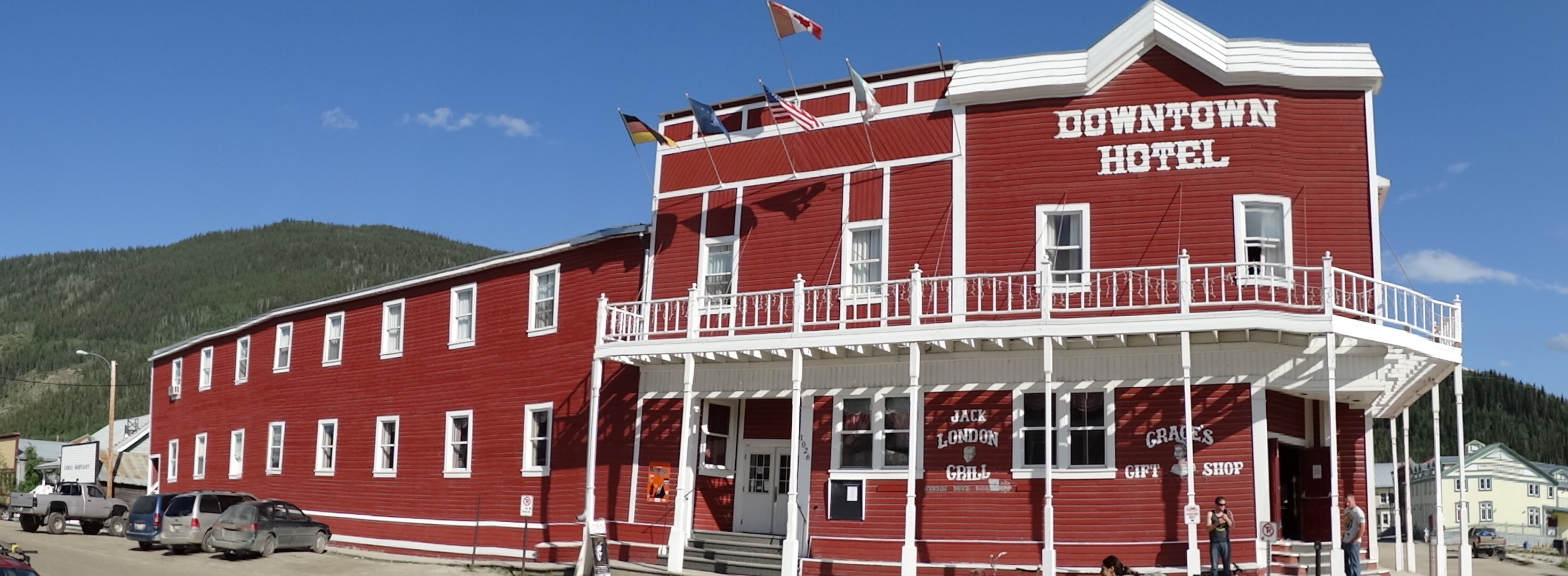
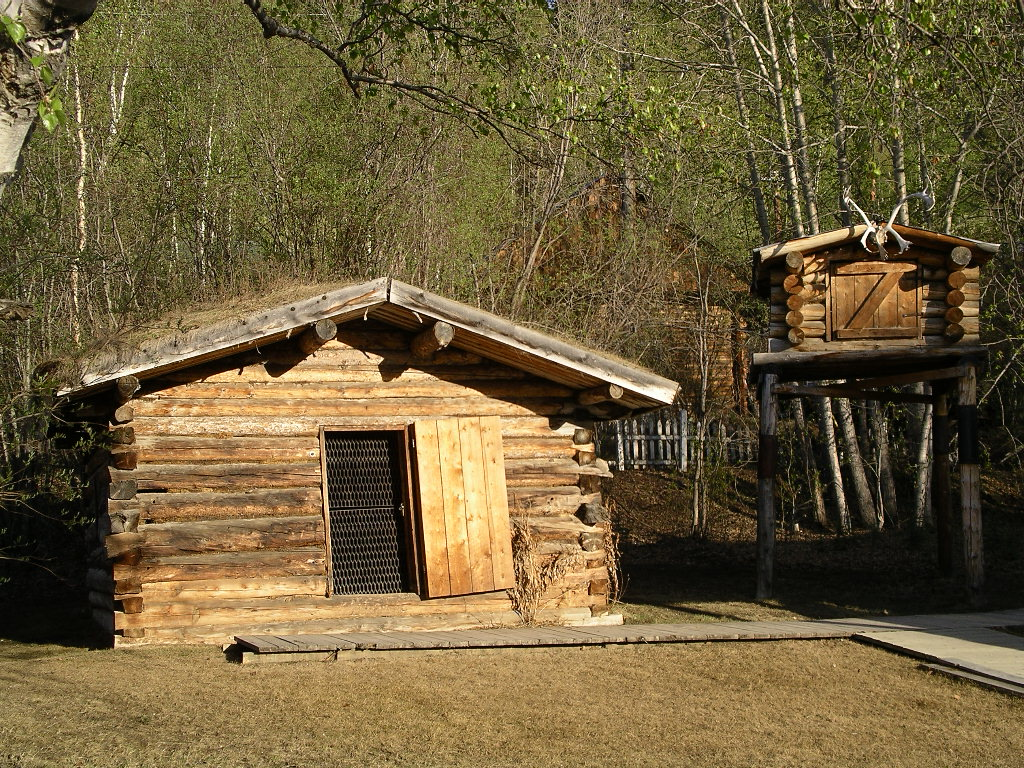
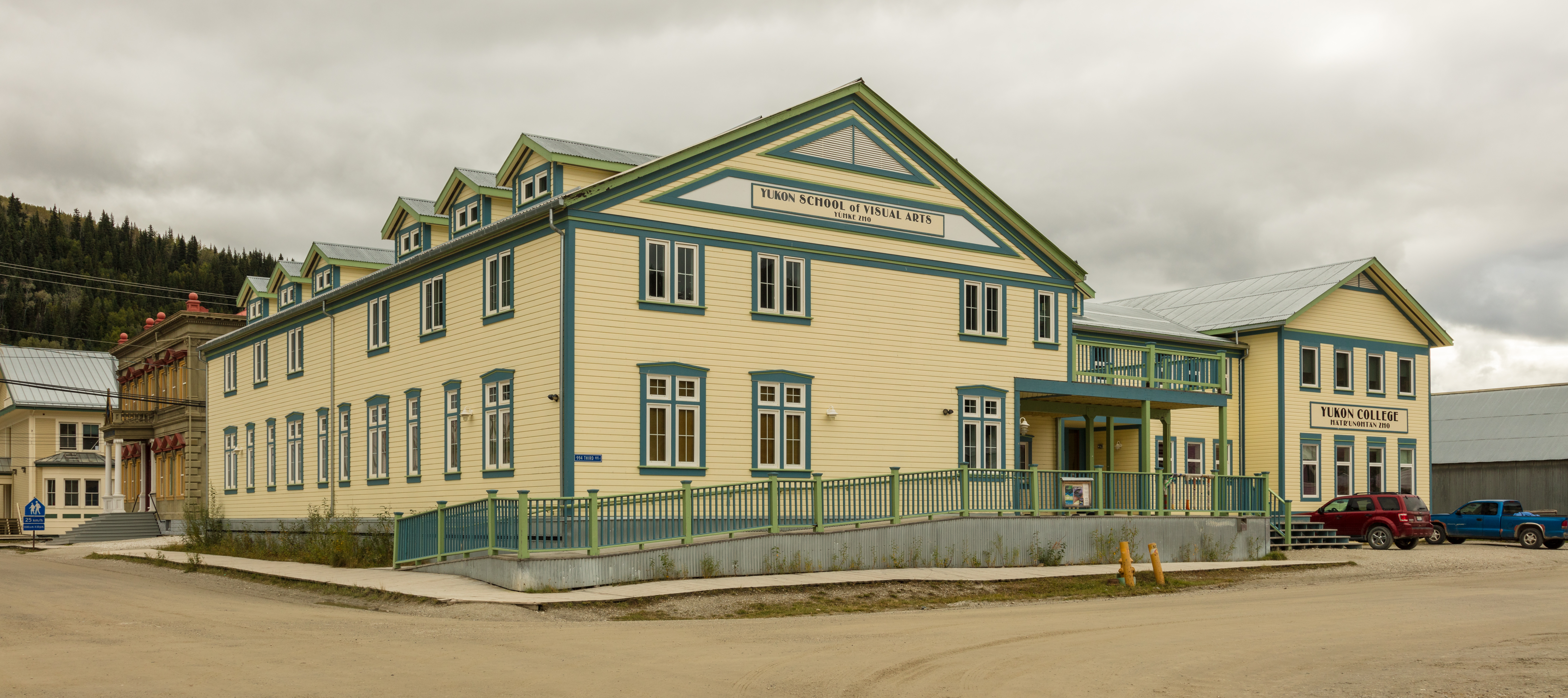
- Aerial view of Dawson City with the Yukon and Klondike rivers Downtown Hotel Jack London Museum Yukon School of Visual Arts
- Nicknames: Paris of the North
- Location of Dawson City
- Coordinates: 64°03′36″N 139°25′55″W
- Country: Canada
- Territory: Yukon
- Settled: 1896
- City: 1902
- Town: 1980
- Named for: George Mercer Dawson

Government
  - Mayor: Stephen Johnson

Area
  - Total: 32.45 km^{2} (12.53 sq mi)
- Elevation: 370 m (1,210 ft)

Population (2016)
  - Total: 1,577
  - Density: 42.4/km^{2} (110/sq mi)
- Time zone: UTC−07:00 (MST)
- Canadian Postal code: Y0B 1G0
- Area code: 867
- NTS Map: 116B3 Dawson
- GNBC Code: KAHFT
- Climate: Dfc
- Website: Official website

UNESCO World Heritage Site
- Type: Cultural
- Criteria: iii, iv
- Designated: 2023 (45th session)
- Part of: Tr’ondëk-Klondike
- Reference no.: 1564-006

Dawson City is a town in the Canadian territory of Yukon. It had a population of 1,577 people as of the 2021 Canadian census, making it the second-largest municipality in Yukon after the territorial capital of Whitehorse. Dawson City is best known for its history as a boomtown during the Klondike Gold Rush, from 1896 until 1899.

== History ==
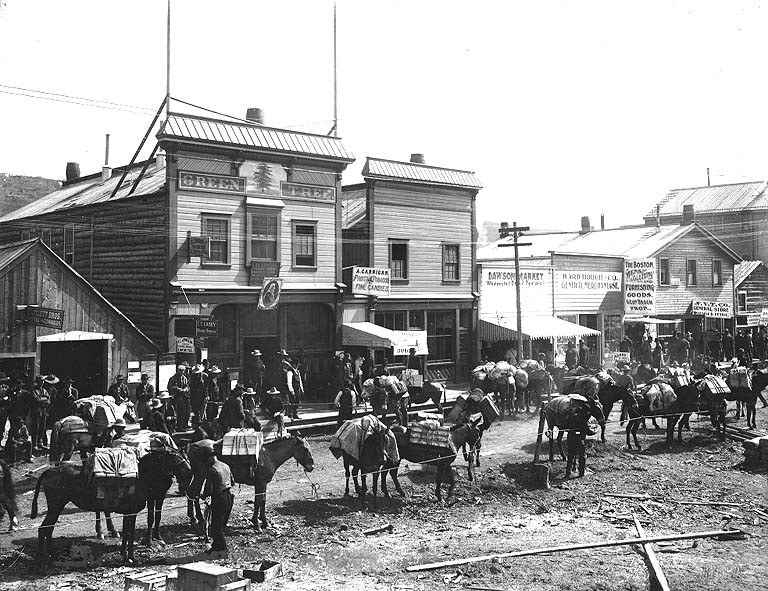
Packtrain in Dawson, 1899 (photographed by Eric A. Hegg)

The area of Dawson City was traditionally used for hunting and gathering by the Hän-speaking people of the Trʼondëk Hwëchʼin First Nation and their ancestors. The heart of their land was Tr'ochëk, a fishing camp at the confluence of the Klondike River and the Yukon River (now a National Historic Site of Canada), just across the Klondike River from modern Dawson City. Tr'ochëk was also an important summer gathering spot, as well as a base for moose hunting on the Klondike Valley.

The settlement of Dawson was founded by Joseph Ladue in January 1897. It was named after noted Canadian geologist George Mercer Dawson, who had explored and mapped the region in 1887. Dawson served as Yukon's capital from the territory's founding in 1898 until 1952, when the capital was resituated in Whitehorse.

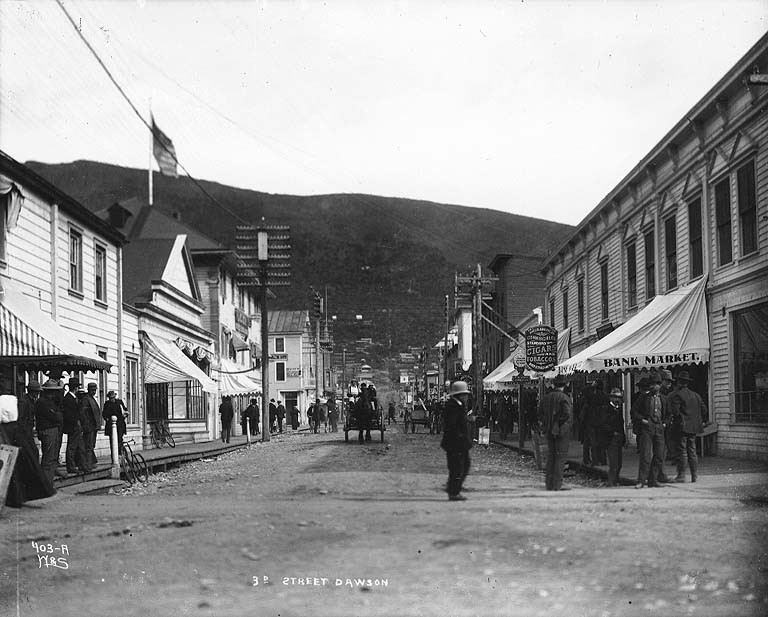
View of 3rd Street c. 1899 by Eric A. Hegg

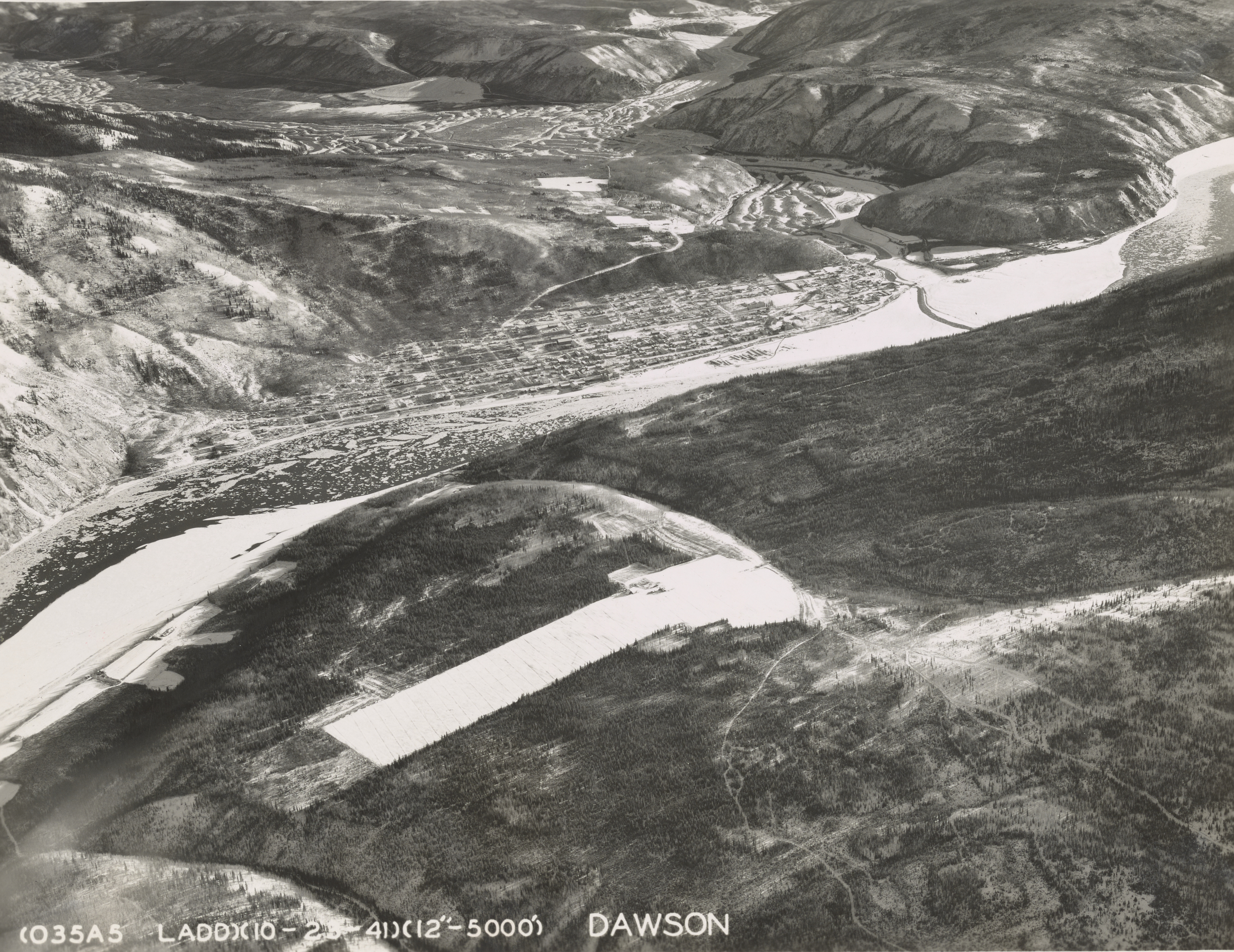
1941 aerial photo

Dawson City was the centre of the Klondike Gold Rush. The gold rush began in August 1896, and transformed what had been the First Nations in Canada's homeland into a thriving city with a population of 16,000–17,000 from all over by 1898. By 1899 the gold rush had ended, and Dawson's population plummeted, leaving only 8,000 people remaining.

By the time Dawson incorporated as a city in 1902, its population had fallen to under 5,000 people. The local population had erected a church that same year (1902), St. Paul's Anglican Church, which is considered a Canadian National Historic Site.

The downtown of Dawson City has been devastated numerous times throughout its history. Fires had destroyed the downtown in 1897, 1899 and 1900, and flooding had destroyed it several times, in 1925, 1944, 1966, 1969 and 1979.

Dawson City's population dropped again after World War II when the Alaska Highway bypassed it 518 kilometres (322 mi) to the south. The economic damage to Dawson City was such that Whitehorse, the highway's hub, replaced it as territorial capital in 1953. Dawson City's population languished around the 600–900 mark through the 1960s and 1970s, but has risen and held stable since then. The high price of gold has made modern placer mining operations profitable, and the growth of tourism has encouraged the development of facilities. In the early 1950s, Dawson was linked by road to Alaska, and in fall 1955, with Whitehorse along a road that now forms part of the Klondike Highway.

In 1978, a construction excavation inadvertently uncovered a forgotten collection of more than 500 discarded films on highly flammable nitrate film stock from the early 20th century that were buried in (and preserved by) permafrost. Dubbed the Dawson Film Find, these silent-era film reels, dating from "between 1903 and 1929, were uncovered in the rubble beneath [an] old hockey rink". Owing to its dangerous chemical volatility, the film was moved by military transport to Library and Archives Canada and the U.S. Library of Congress for transfer to safety film and storage. A documentary about the find, Dawson City: Frozen Time, was released in 2016.

The film City of Gold , by Colin Low and Wolf Koenig, and narrated by Pierre Berton, chronicling Dawson City during the Klondike Gold Rush, made innovative use of archival photos, winning First Prize for documentary film at the 1957 Cannes Film Festival.

Dawson City and the nearby ghost town of Forty Mile are featured prominently in the novels and short stories of American author Jack London, including The Call of the Wild. London lived in the area from October 1897 to June 1898. Other writers who lived in and wrote of Dawson City include Pierre Berton and the poet Robert Service. The childhood home of the former is now used as a residency and retreat for professional writers administered by the Writers' Trust of Canada.

In 2023, the Dawson City townsite became part of the Tr’ondëk-Klondike UNESCO World Heritage Site, because of its archaeological record highlighting the transformation of the site from predominantly Indigenous to predominantly European use, and the adaptations that the Indigenous people made in response to European colonialism.

On May 17, 2026, the iconic Gold Rush-era Westminster Hotel was razed to the ground by a fire.

== Geography ==
Dawson City lies on the Tintina Fault. This fault has created the Tintina Trench and continues eastward for several hundred kilometres. Erosional remnants of lava flows form outcrops immediately north and west of Dawson City.

=== Climate ===
Dawson City has a subarctic climate (Köppen climate classification: Dfc), with significantly higher continentality (greater temperature swings) than the territorial capital of Whitehorse.

The average temperature in July is 15.9 °C (60.6 °F) and in January is −25.7 °C (−14.3 °F). The highest temperature ever recorded is 35.0 °C (95.0 °F) on 9 July 1899 and 18 June 1950. The lowest temperature ever recorded is −58.3 °C (−73 °F) on 3 February 1947. It experiences a wide range of temperatures surpassing 30 °C (86 °F) in most summers and dropping below −40 °C (−40 °F) in winter. In the very cold month of December 1917, the temperature did not rise above −37.2 °C (−35.0 °F) and it averaged −46.3 °C (−51.3 °F).

The community is at an elevation of 320 m (1,050 ft) and the average rainfall in July is 53.3 mm (2.10 in) and the average snowfall in January is 28.4 cm (11.18 in). Dawson has an average total annual snowfall of 161.9 cm (63.74 in) and averages 77 frost free days per year. The town is built on a layer of frozen earth, which may pose a threat to the town's infrastructure in the future if the permafrost melts.

Climate data for Dawson (Dawson City Airport) Climate ID: 2100402; coordinates 64°02′35″N 139°07′40″W; elevation: 370.3 m (1,215 ft); 1991–2020 normals, extremes 1897–present (Note: Composite data from Dawson: WMO ID: 71966; coordinates 64°03′39″N 139°07′36″W; elevation: 370 m (1,210 ft))
Month	Jan	Feb	Mar	Apr	May	Jun	Jul	Aug	Sep	Oct	Nov	Dec	Year
Record high humidex	9.7	8.8	14.3	22.8	34.9	34.4	39.4	37.9	24.9	19.9	10.0	6.6	39.4
Record high °C (°F)	9.7 (49.5)	9.5 (49.1)	14.8 (58.6)	22.5 (72.5)	34.7 (94.5)	34.5 (94.1)	35.0 (95.0)	33.5 (92.3)	25.3 (77.5)	17.7 (63.9)	10.6 (51.1)	6.5 (43.7)	35.0 (95.0)
Mean daily maximum °C (°F)	−21.6 (−6.9)	−15.1 (4.8)	−4.2 (24.4)	7.9 (46.2)	16.4 (61.5)	22.1 (71.8)	23.1 (73.6)	19.5 (67.1)	12.6 (54.7)	0.2 (32.4)	−13.7 (7.3)	−18.8 (−1.8)	2.4 (36.3)
Daily mean °C (°F)	−25.7 (−14.3)	−20.9 (−5.6)	−12.6 (9.3)	0.4 (32.7)	8.8 (47.8)	14.4 (57.9)	15.9 (60.6)	12.7 (54.9)	6.4 (43.5)	−4.0 (24.8)	−17.7 (0.1)	−23.0 (−9.4)	−3.8 (25.2)
Mean daily minimum °C (°F)	−29.8 (−21.6)	−26.5 (−15.7)	−20.9 (−5.6)	−7.1 (19.2)	1.2 (34.2)	6.7 (44.1)	8.7 (47.7)	5.8 (42.4)	0.2 (32.4)	−8.2 (17.2)	−21.7 (−7.1)	−27.1 (−16.8)	−9.9 (14.2)
Record low °C (°F)	−56.2 (−69.2)	−58.3 (−72.9)	−47.5 (−53.5)	−32.0 (−25.6)	−13.5 (7.7)	−3.0 (26.6)	−2.0 (28.4)	−11.0 (12.2)	−23.2 (−9.8)	−36.5 (−33.7)	−47.9 (−54.2)	−52.8 (−63.0)	−55.8 (−68.4)
Record low wind chill	−60.3	−58.6	−47.7	−37.9	−18.5	−5.0	−2.8	−9.2	−25.8	−41.0	−51.3	−60.0	−60.3
Average precipitation mm (inches)	17.6 (0.69)	13.2 (0.52)	11.2 (0.44)	10.7 (0.42)	27.9 (1.10)	43.7 (1.72)	48.1 (1.89)	47.8 (1.88)	30.4 (1.20)	25.7 (1.01)	22.6 (0.89)	19.6 (0.77)	318.5 (12.54)
Average rainfall mm (inches)	0.1 (0.00)	0.2 (0.01)	0.3 (0.01)	3.3 (0.13)	24.5 (0.96)	41.1 (1.62)	53.3 (2.10)	43.0 (1.69)	33.3 (1.31)	8.6 (0.34)	0.2 (0.01)	0.0 (0.0)	207.8 (8.18)
Average snowfall cm (inches)	28.4 (11.2)	16.7 (6.6)	13.7 (5.4)	6.2 (2.4)	2.0 (0.8)	0.0 (0.0)	0.0 (0.0)	0.0 (0.0)	4.0 (1.6)	24.3 (9.6)	33.0 (13.0)	33.5 (13.2)	161.9 (63.7)
Average precipitation days (≥ 0.2 mm)	12.3	8.7	9.0	9.3	14.5	13.9	15.9	15.8	12.6	12.0	13.2	11.3	148.6
Average rainy days (≥ 0.2 mm)	0.21	0.1	0.22	2.6	10.1	12.5	14.5	14.2	11.5	3.7	0.27	0.05	69.7
Average snowy days (≥ 0.2 cm)	12.3	9.2	7.6	2.8	0.9	0.0	0.0	0.0	1.7	9.6	13.2	13.5	70.7
Average relative humidity (%) (at 1500 LST)	75.2	73.1	52.3	36.4	32.7	37.4	43.7	48.4	52.9	72.1	80.3	78.3	56.9
Source: Environment and Climate Change Canada {February minimum) (July maximum) (December minimum}

== Demographics ==
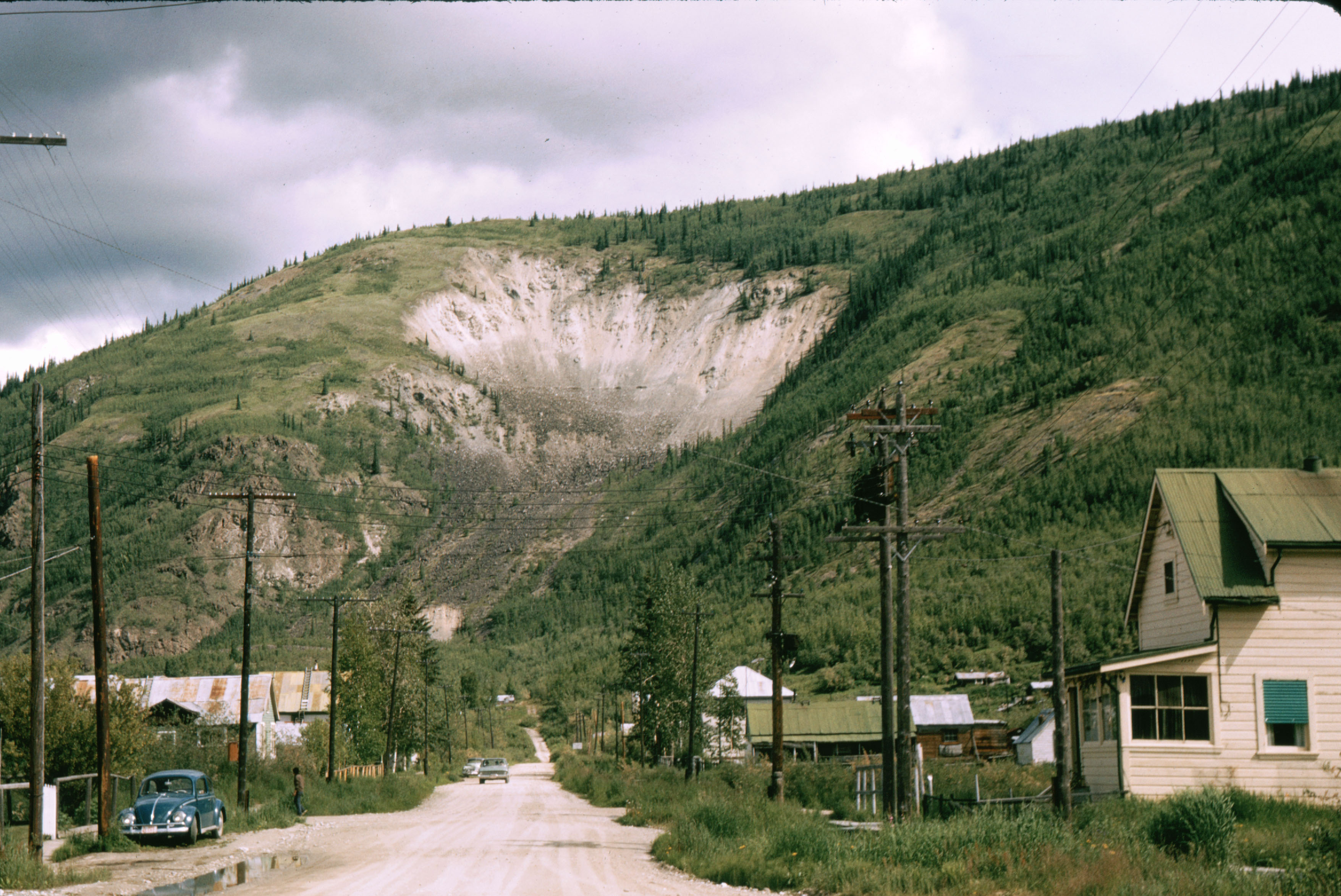
Streetscape and landslide at mountain side; Dawson City, 1964

Federal census population history of Dawson
Year	Pop.	±%
1901	9,142	—
1911	3,013	−67.0%
1921	975	−67.6%
1931	819	−16.0%
1941	1,043	+27.4%
1951	783	−24.9%
1956	851	+8.7%
1961	881	+3.5%
1966	742	−15.8%
1971	762	+2.7%
1976	838	+10.0%
1981	697	−16.8%
1986	896	+28.6%
1991	972	+8.5%
1996	1,287	+32.4%
2001	1,251	−2.8%
2006	1,327	+6.1%
2011	1,319	−0.6%
2016	1,375	+4.2%
2021	1,577	+14.7%
Source: Statistics Canada

In the 2021 Census of Population conducted by Statistics Canada, Dawson had a population of 1,577 living in 770 of its 836 total private dwellings, a change of 14.7% from its 2016 population of 1,375. With a land area of 30.91 km^{2} (11.93 sq mi), it had a population density of 51.0/km^{2} (132.1/sq mi) in 2021.

=== Ethnicity ===
According to the 2021 Census, the town is predominantly European Canadian with 60.8% of the population with Indigenous Canadians accounting for 31.4% of the population and East Asian Canadians accounting for 3.0% of the population.

Panethnic groups in Dawson City (2001−2021)
Panethnic group	2021		2016		2011		2006		2001	
Panethnic group	Pop.	%	Pop.	%	Pop.	%	Pop.	%	Pop.	%
European (Note: Statistic includes all persons that did not make up part of a visible minority or an indigenous identity.)	900	60.81%	940	70.15%	830	64.09%	915	69.32%	885	71.08%
Indigenous	465	31.42%	310	23.13%	435	33.59%	390	29.55%	340	27.31%
East Asian (Note: Statistic includes total responses of "Chinese", "Korean", and "Japanese" under visible minority section on census.)	45	3.04%	0	0%	0	0%	0	0%	0	0%
South Asian	25	1.69%	0	0%	0	0%	0	0%	20	1.61%
Southeast Asian (Note: Statistic includes total responses of "Filipino" and "Southeast Asian" under visible minority section on census.)	20	1.35%	60	4.48%	0	0%	0	0%	0	0%
African	15	1.01%	15	1.12%	0	0%	10	0.76%	10	0.8%
Latin American	10	0.68%	20	1.49%	0	0%	0	0%	0	0%
Middle Eastern (Note: Statistic includes total responses of "West Asian" and "Arab" under visible minority section on census.)	0	0%	0	0%	0	0%	10	0.76%	0	0%
Other/multiracial (Note: Statistic includes total responses of "Visible minority, n.i.e." and "Multiple visible minorities" under visible minority section on census.)	0	0%	0	0%	35	2.7%	0	0%	0	0%
Total responses	1,480	93.85%	1,340	97.45%	1,295	98.18%	1,320	99.47%	1,245	99.52%
Total population	1,577	100%	1,375	100%	1,319	100%	1,327	100%	1,251	100%
Note: Totals greater than 100% due to multiple origin responses

== Economy ==
Today, Dawson City's main industries are tourism and gold mining.

=== Energy ===
Electricity is provided by Yukon Energy Corporation (YEC). Most of the grid power is hydroelectric power through the north-south grid from dams near Mayo, Whitehorse and Aishihik Lake. After the local hydroelectric power plant for the gold dredges was shut down in 1966, YEC provided electrical power from local diesel generators. In 2004 YEC connected Dawson to its grid system. Since then the diesel generators function as a backup to the grid.

=== Gold mining ===
Gold mining started in 1896 with the Bonanza (Rabbit) Creek discovery by George Carmack, Tagish Charlie and Skookum Jim Mason (Keish). The area's creeks were quickly staked and most of the thousands who arrived in the spring of 1898 for the Klondike Gold Rush found that there was very little opportunity to benefit directly from gold mining. Many instead became entrepreneurs to provide services to miners.

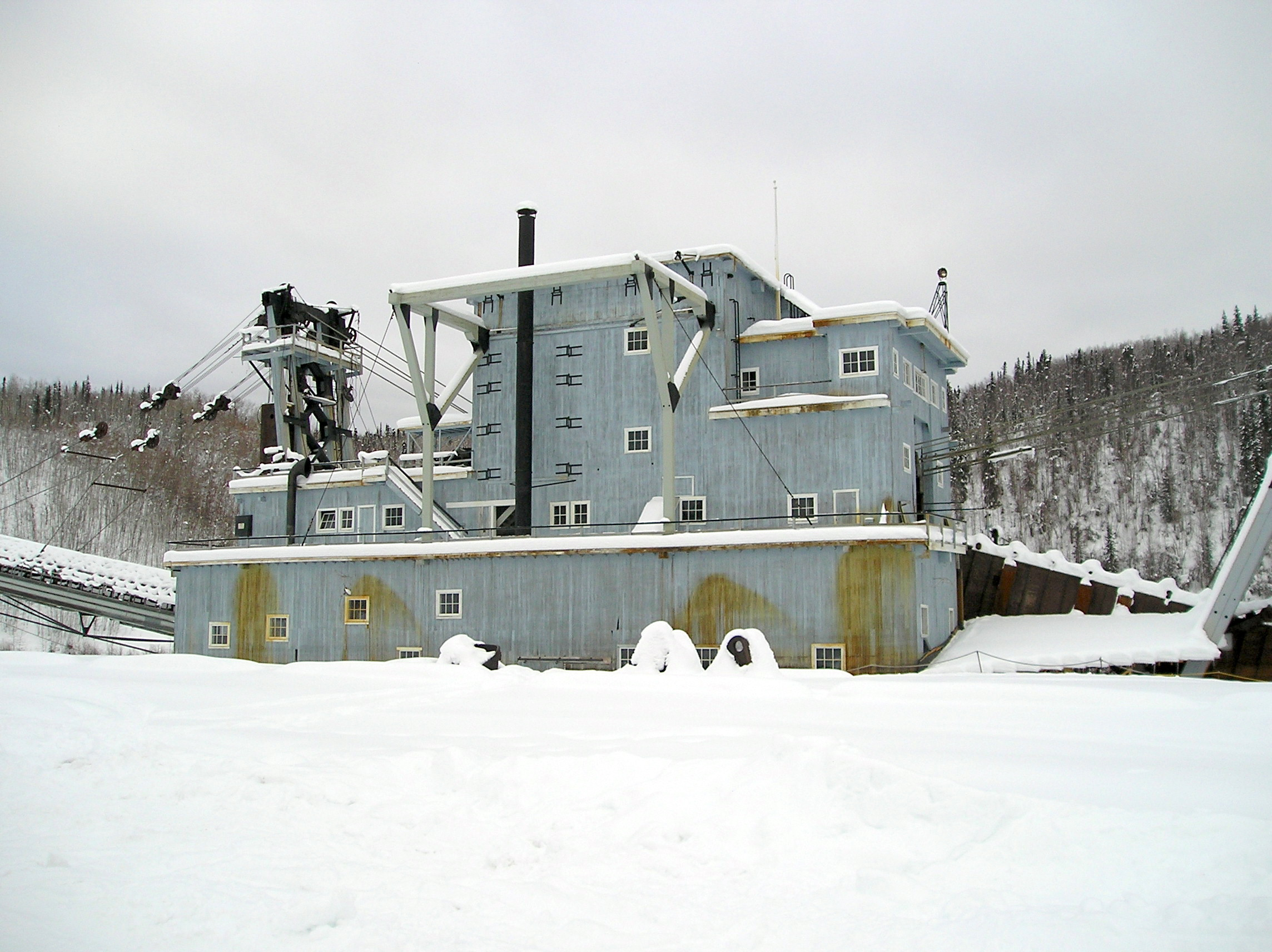
Dredge No. 4

Starting approximately 10 years later, large gold dredges began an industrial mining operation, scooping huge amounts of gold out of the creeks, and completely reworking the landscape, altering the locations of rivers and creeks and leaving tailing piles in their wake. A network of canals and dams were built to the north to produce hydroelectric power for the dredges. The dredges shut down for the winter, but one built for "Klondike Joe Boyle" was designed to operate year-round, and Boyle had it operate all through one winter. That dredge (Dredge No. 4) is open as a National Historic Site of Canada on Bonanza Creek.

The last dredge shut down in 1966, and the hydroelectric facility, at North Fork, was closed when the City of Dawson declined an offer to purchase it. Since then, placer miners returned to the status of being the primary mining operators in the region until recently. In 2016, Goldcorp announced a takeover of Kaminak Gold's Coffee Project south of Dawson. This marked a shift in the region, drawing the interest of the major gold mining companies in the Yukon. In 2017, Newmont Mining Corporation, Barrick Gold and Agnico Eagle Mines Limited have all committed significant investment, engaging in the exploration of properties across the Central Yukon.

=== Tourism ===
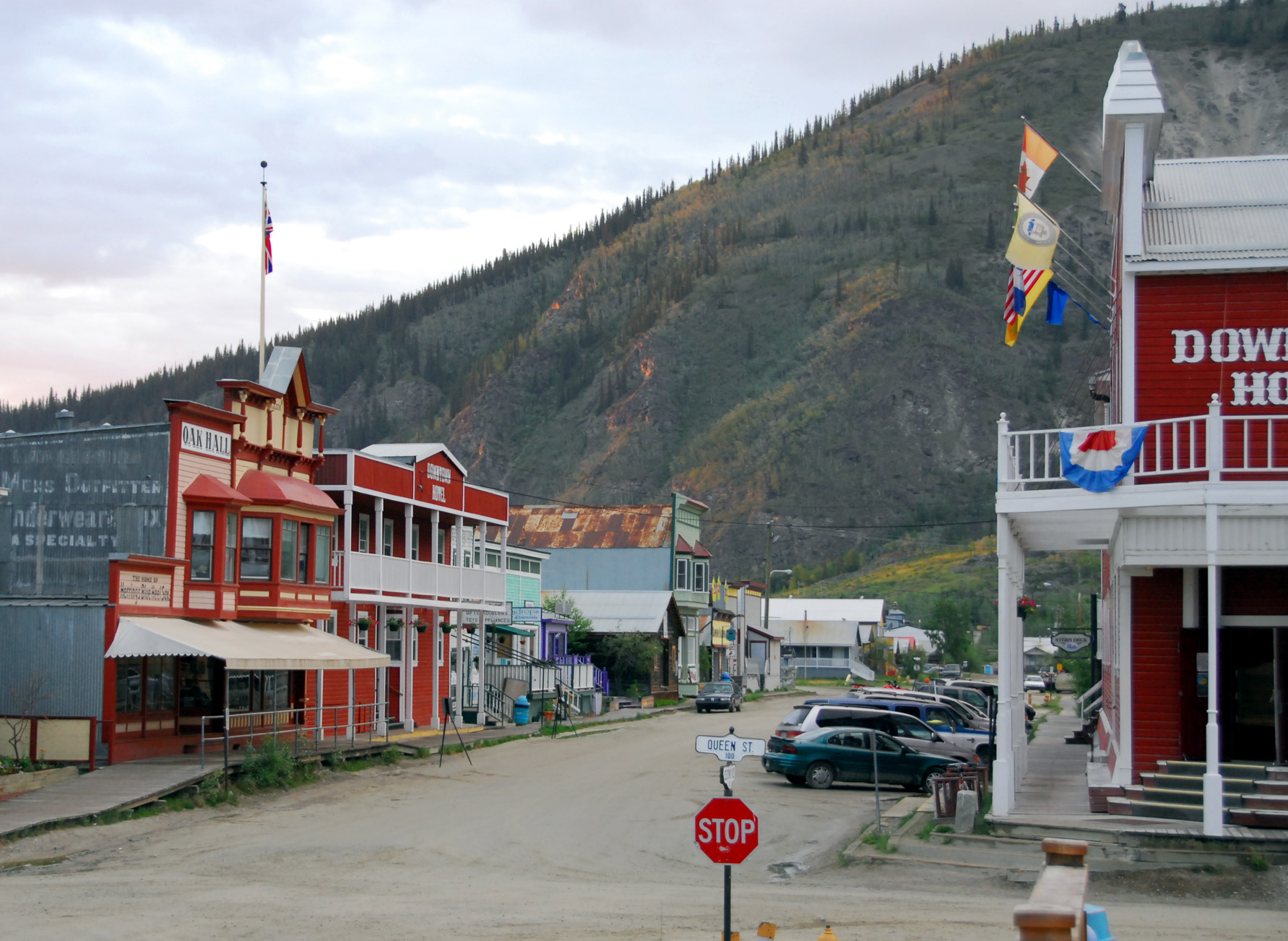
Most of Dawson's buildings have the appearance of 19th-Century construction. All new construction must comply with visual standards ensuring conformity to this appearance

There are eight National Historic Sites of Canada located in Dawson, including the Dawson Historical Complex, a National Historic Site encompassing the historic core of the town.

The Downtown Hotel at Second Avenue and Queen Street has garnered media attention for its unusual Sourtoe Cocktail, which features a real mummified human toe. The hotel and the toe received increased attention in June 2017 after the toe was stolen; it was soon returned to the hotel by mail along with a written apology.

Bonanza Creek has two National Historic Sites; the Discovery Claim and the Dredge No. 4.

Tr'ochëk is the site of a traditional Hän fishing camp on the flats at the confluence of the Klondike River and Yukon River. The site is owned and managed by the Tr’ondëk Hwëch’in First Nation. In addition to the fishing camp remains, the site includes traditional plant harvesting areas and lookout points.

Diamond Tooth Gertie's Gambling Hall puts on nightly vaudeville shows during tourist season, from May to September.

== Sports ==
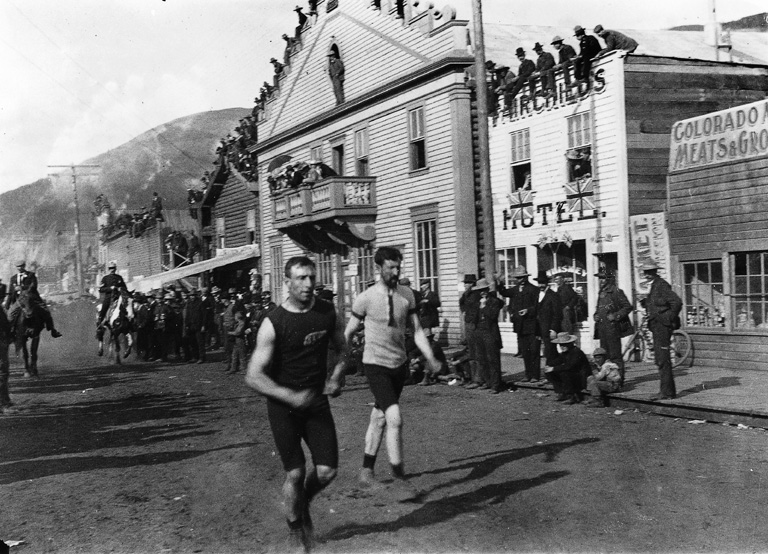
Foot race, Dawson City, about 1900

Every February, Dawson City acts as the halfway mark for the Yukon Quest International Sled Dog Race. Mushers entered in the event have a mandatory 36-hour layover in Dawson City while getting their rest and preparing for the second half of the world's toughest sled dog race.

Dawson City also hosts a softball tournament which brings teams from Inuvik in late summer. Furthermore, a volleyball tournament is held annually at the end of October and is attended by various high schools across Yukon.

The city was home to the Dawson City Nuggets hockey team, which in 1905 challenged the Ottawa Silver Seven for the Stanley Cup. Travelling to Ottawa by dog sled, ship, and train, the team lost the most lopsided series in Stanley Cup history, losing two games by the combined score of 32 to 4.

== Government ==
Dawson City federal election results
Year	Liberal		Conservative		New Democratic		Green	
2021	22%	149	22%	153	34%	237	6%	40
2019	29%	213	24%	176	30%	225	15%	110

In 2004, the Yukon government removed the mayor and the town council of Dawson City as a result of its municipal government going bankrupt. The territorial government accepted a large portion of the responsibility for this situation in March 2006, writing off $3.43 million of the debt and leaving the town with $1.5 million still to pay off. Elections were set for June 15, 2006. John Steins, a local artist and one of the leaders of the movement to restore democracy to Dawson, was acclaimed as mayor, while 13 residents ran for the four council seats. Steins was succeeded in office by former mayor Peter Jenkins, who in turn was succeeded by Wayne Potoroka.

In 2021, four candidates ran for mayor, and former city councillor William (Bill) Kendrick won the election and is the current mayor of Dawson City.

Other past mayors of Dawson City have included Art Webster, Colin Mayes, Yolanda Burkhard, Mike Comadina and Vi Campbell.

In the Legislative Assembly of Yukon, Dawson City is in the electoral district of Klondike, currently represented by Brent McDonald of the Yukon NDP.

The government of Tr’ondëk Hwëch’in, now a self-governing First Nation, is also located in Dawson.

In 2024, councillors refused to swear allegiance to King Charles III in solidarity with councillor-elect Darwyn Lynn, who refused in protest against the historic relations between the monarchy and the First Nations.

=== City or town status ===
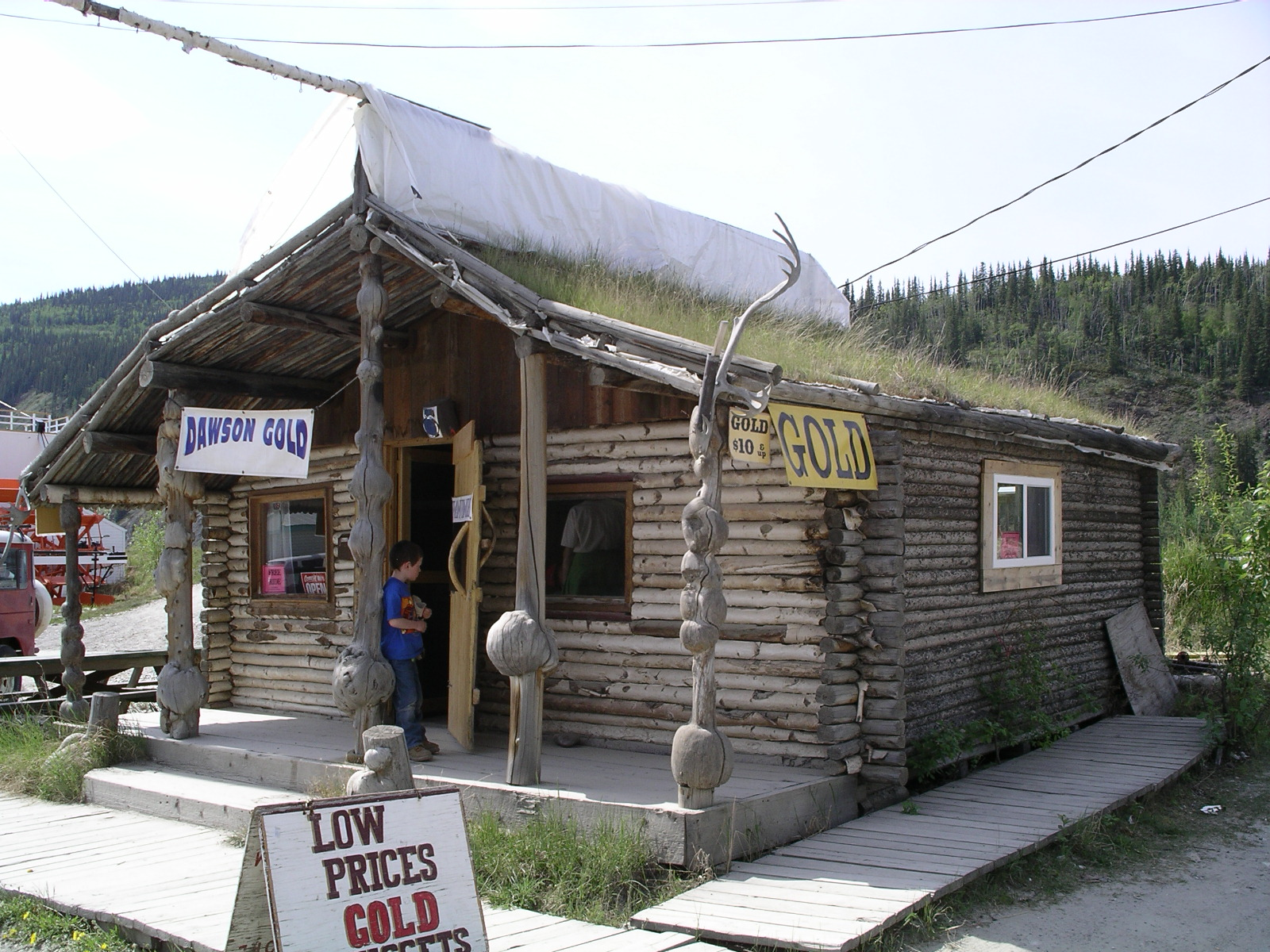
Dawson Gold

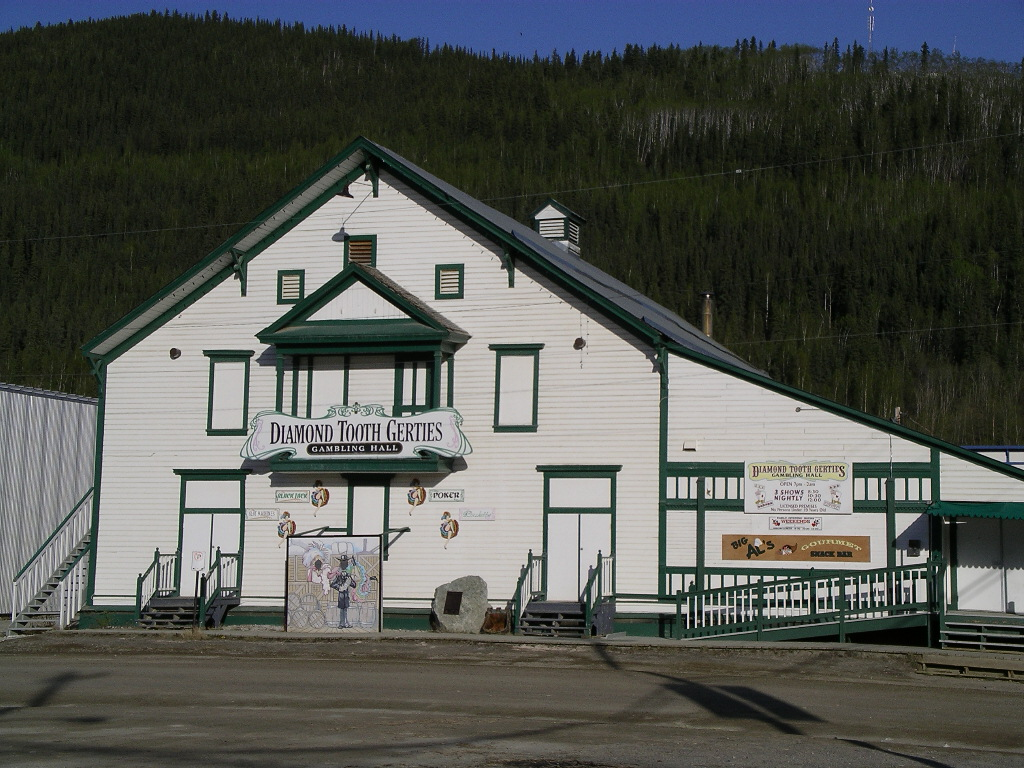
Diamond Tooth Gerties

Dawson was incorporated as a city in 1902 when it met the criteria for "city" status under the municipal act of that time. It retained the incorporation even as the population plummeted. When a new municipal act was adopted in the 1980s, Dawson met the criteria of "town", and was incorporated as such although with a special provision to allow it to continue to use the word "City", partially for historical reasons and partially to distinguish it from Dawson Creek, British Columbia.

Dawson Creek is also named in honour of George M. Dawson. This led the territorial government to post the following signs at the boundaries of the town: "Welcome to the Town of the City of Dawson". As of the 2001 Municipal Act, the town's official legal name is now simply the "City of Dawson".

== Infrastructure ==
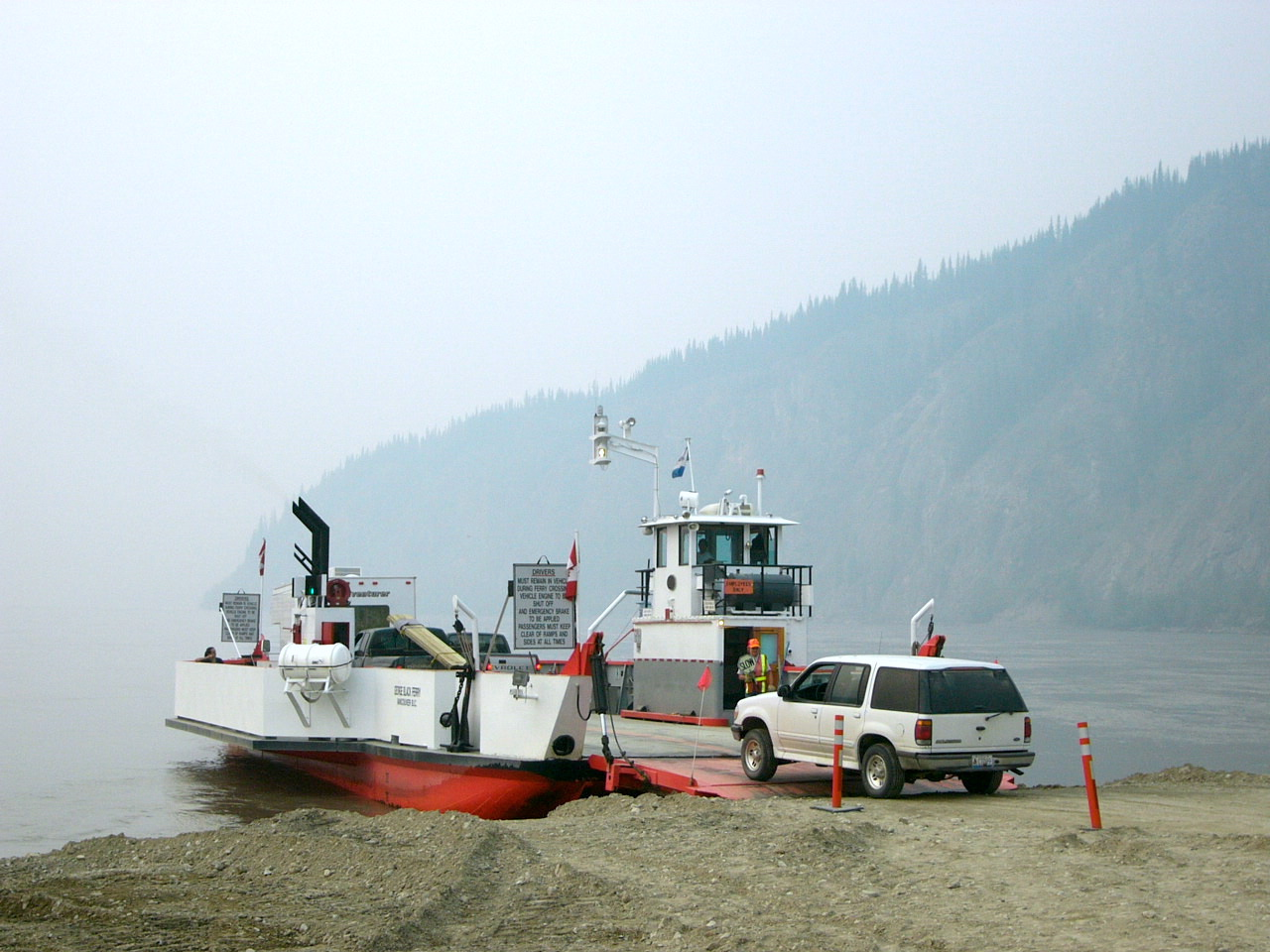
Ferry for Highway 9

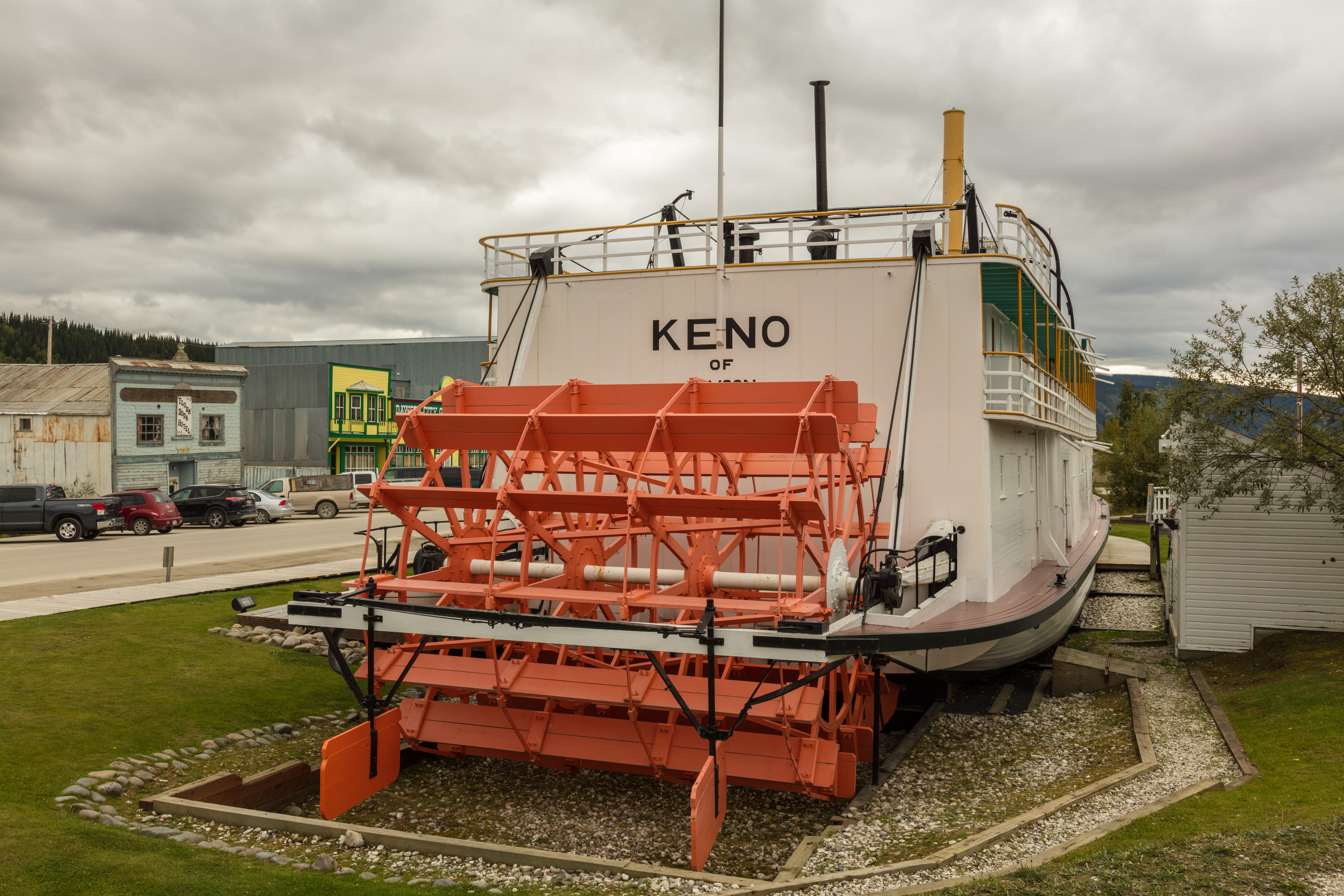
Paddlewheeler Keno

- Airports: Dawson City Airport is located 8 nautical miles (15 km; 9.2 mi) east of town. Dawson City Water Aerodrome is located next to the community on the Yukon River. Both are classified as an airport of entry and, as such, can handle aircraft with up to 30 passengers. The water aerodrome is one of only two in Canada that is able to handle aircraft with more than 15 passengers.
- Road: Klondike Highway (Yukon route 2) from Whitehorse, open year-round; Top of the World Highway (Yukon route 9) and Taylor Highway (Alaska route 5) from Tok, Alaska, open seasonally May to September.
- Winter transportation: During the winter, Dawson City is accessible via the North Klondike Highway. There is an ice bridge across the Yukon River, for both foot and vehicle traffic, that is operated and maintained by the Yukon Department of Highways.
- Rail: None currently. See Klondike Mines Railway
- Boat: The George Black Ferry connects the North Klondike Hwy to the Top of the World Highway, by operating vehicle and passenger ferry service across the Yukon River. This is part of the Territorial highway system, and operates from May to October, weather dependent. There is no cost to use this ferry.

The Yukon River is navigable (when not frozen) and historically was travelled by commercial riverboats to Whitehorse and downstream into Alaska and the Bering Sea.

- Cable television: municipal government-owned system with several channels via satellite
- Telephone/Internet: Northwestel telephone exchange. and ran fibre internet to the community in 2021.

== Education ==
Yukon School of Visual Arts, a university level accredited art program, is based in Dawson City.

Robert Service School, Dawson City's only grade school, is named in honour of British-Canadian poet and writer Robert William Service (January 16, 1874 – September 11, 1958). The Robert Service School offers Kindergarten – Grade 12 and is one of only 28 schools in the Yukon Territory.

== Media ==
Television

OTA channel	Call sign	Network
9 (VHF)	CH4261	Aboriginal Peoples Television Network

Radio

Frequency	Call sign	Branding	Format	Owner	Notes
AM 560	CBDN	CBC Radio One	Talk radio, public radio	Canadian Broadcasting Corporation	Rebroadcaster of CFWH-FM (Whitehorse)
FM 90.5	VF2049	–	Community radio	Northern Native Broadcasting	First Nations community radio; rebroadcaster of CHON-FM (Whitehorse)
FM 104.9	CBDN-FM	CBC Radio 2	Adult contemporary, public radio	Canadian Broadcasting Corporation	Rebroadcaster of CBU-FM (Vancouver)
FM 106.9	CFYT-FM	CFYT: The Spirit of Dawson	Community radio	Dawson City Community Radio Society	Rebroadcasts CKRW-FM (Whitehorse) when not airing local programming

Print

- Dawson City is not served by a daily newspaper. The local Klondike Sun is published every two weeks, and the Whitehorse-based Yukon News is available two days per week.

== Notable people ==
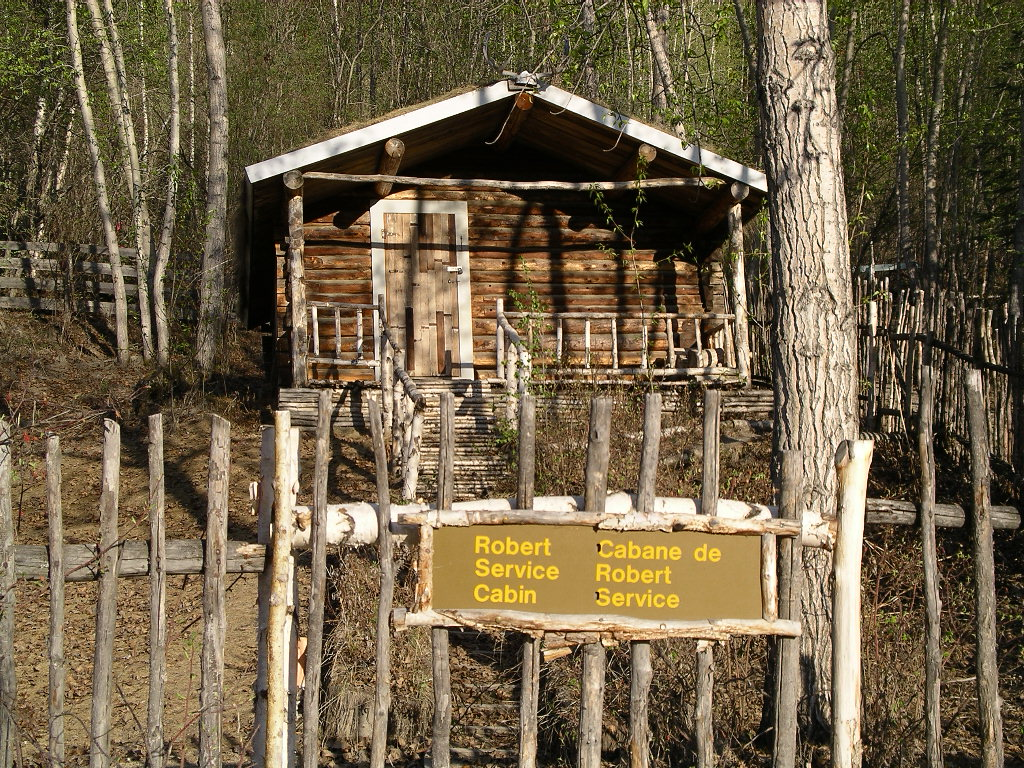
Robert Service Cabin

- Pierre Berton: Dawson City is home of the Berton House Writers' Retreat program, housing four established Canadian writers for three-month subsidized residencies each, per year. Berton House was the childhood home of popular-history writer Berton. The program is now administered by the Writers' Trust of Canada. Berton narrated the 1957 film City of Gold which describes the excitement of Dawson City during the gold rush. He also wrote the book Klondike, an historical account of the gold rush to the Klondike in 1896–1899.
- Martha Black (1866-1957), moved to Dawson after the end of the gold rush in 1900, a new single mother. She earned a living by staking gold mining claims and running a sawmill and a gold ore-crushing plant. In 1904, she married George Black, Commissioner of Yukon from 1912-1916. In 1935, she was elected to the House of Commons for the riding of Yukon as an Independent Conservative taking the place of her ill husband.
- Joseph W. Boyle, "Klondike Joe," entrepreneur, hockey organizer and adventurer.
- Suzanne Crocker, documentary filmmaker.
- John D. Ferry, chemist and biochemist, was born in Dawson in 1912
- Lulu Mae Johnson, manager of Dawson's dance hall in the early 1900s. She died on the SS Princess Sophia.
- Victor Jory, actor of stage, film, and television, was born in Dawson in 1902 to American parents.
- William Judge, a Jesuit priest who during the 1897 Klondike Gold Rush established a facility in Dawson which provided shelter, food and any available medicine to the many hard-at-luck gold miners who filled the town and its environs.
- Jack London spent the late Autumn of 1897 and Spring of 1898 in Dawson. He spent part of the winter 1897–1898 in a cabin that was originally on Henderson Creek, a tributary of the Stewart River. In the 1960s, it was disassembled and moved to its present location adjacent to downtown Dawson.
- Micí Mac Gabhann, an Irish language storyteller (seanchaí) who lived in Dawson in 1897–98 and whose memoirs of the Klondyke Gold Rush Rotha Mór an tSaoil were published posthumously in 1959.
- William Ogilvie, a Dominion land surveyor, explorer and Commissioner of the Yukon, surveyed the townsite of Dawson City and was responsible for settling many disputes between miners.
- Alexander Pantages, impresario, had his start in Dawson City. He opened a small theatre to serve the city. Soon, however, his activities expanded and the thrifty Greek went on and became one of America's greatest theatre and movie tycoons.
- Robert W. Service, known as The Bard of the Yukon for his famous poems "The Shooting of Dan McGrew", "The Cremation of Sam McGee" and many others which depicted the Gold Rush and the culture of the Klondike. Service was transferred to the Dawson branch of the Canadian Bank of Commerce in Dawson City in 1908. Then, he dwelt in a log cabin where he would pursue his writings with The Trail of 98.
- Joe Vogler, Alaskan politician, buried in Dawson.
- Jan Eskymo Welzl was a Moravian adventurer, hunter, gold prospector, Eskimo chief and chief justice on New Siberia island and later a story-teller and writer. During his life in Dawson City he was called Perpetual Motion Man and was also known as an inventor. Books based on his stories were published in many countries all over the world. Buried in Dawson City.
- Black Mike Winage, a Serbian-Canadian miner, pioneer, and adventurer, who lived to be 107 years old, lived in Dawson City.
- Weldy Young, professional hockey player for the Ottawa Silver Seven.

== Freedom of the City ==
The following people and military units have received the Freedom of the City of Dawson City.

=== Military Units ===
- The Canadian Rangers: 22 August 2022.

== See also ==
- List of municipalities in Yukon
- North-West Mounted Police in the Canadian north
