= Joseph W. Boyle =

Canadian businessman and entrepreneur (1867–1923)

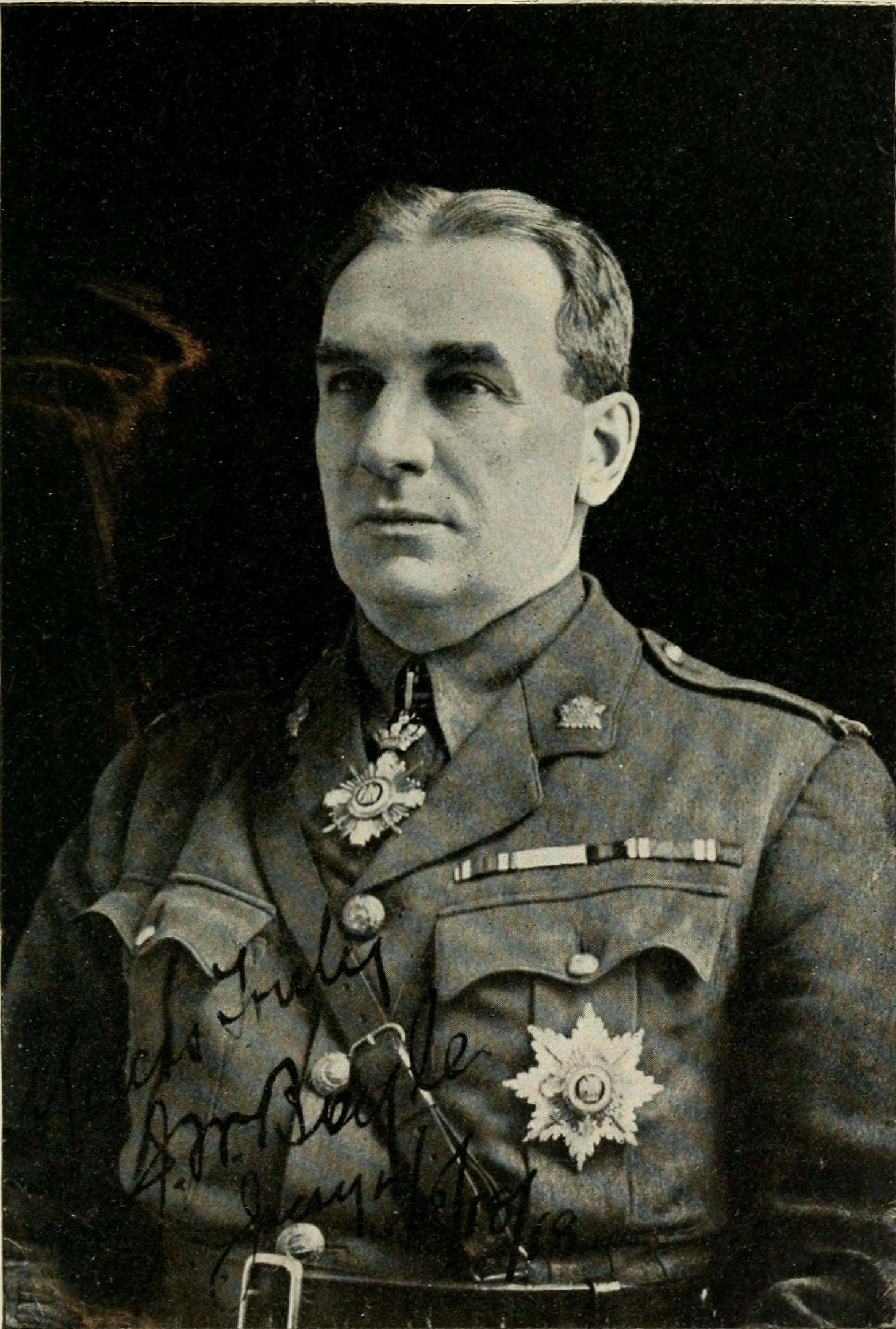
- Born: 6 November 1867; Toronto, Ontario, Canada
- Died: 14 April 1923 (aged 55); Hampton Hill, Middlesex, England
- Resting place: Woodstock Presbyterian Cemetery, Woodstock, Ontario
- Occupations: Adventurer; miner; businessman
- Parents: Charles Boyle (father); Martha Bain Boyle (mother)

Joseph Whiteside Boyle DSO (6 November 1867 – 14 April 1923), better known as Klondike Joe Boyle, was a Canadian adventurer who became a businessman and entrepreneur in the United Kingdom. In the First World War he came to see service assisting the allied Kingdom of Romania.

== Family ==
Joseph Boyle was born in Toronto, Ontario, the son of Canadian Horse Racing Hall of Fame racehorse trainer Charles Boyle and wife Martha Bain Boyle. His brother, David A. Boyle, would follow in their father's footsteps and become a Thoroughbred racehorse trainer. His family had immigrated from the Ulster region of Ireland (modern Northern Ireland) to Canada in 1839. The Boyle family were Protestants and Unionist in their political sympathies, but he was always proud to call himself a "fighting Irishman". Though he was born in Toronto, he grew up in Woodstock.

== Early career ==
Boyle was early to recognize the potential of large-scale gold mining in the Klondike gold fields, and as the initial placer mining operations waned after 1900, Boyle and other companies imported equipment to assemble enormous dredges, usually electric-powered, that took millions more ounces of gold from the creeks while turning the landscape upside-down, shifting creeks.

An avid hockey fan, Boyle began in 1902 to sponsor hockey teams to play in Dawson City for the benefit of the miners. Boyle organized an ice hockey team in 1905, often known as the Dawson City Nuggets, that endured a difficult journey to Ottawa, Ontario (by overland sled, train, coastal steamer, then transcontinental train) to play the Ottawa Silver Seven for the Stanley Cup, which until 1924 was awarded to the top ice hockey team in Canada and could be challenged for by a team. Ottawa thrashed the Dawson team. In 1909, he married an American woman, Elma Louise Humphries while on a visit to Detroit.

== First World War ==
On 4 August 1914, Great Britain declared war on Germany following the invasion of Belgium and Canada as part of the British empire was now at war. The same day, Boyle attended a rally at the Dawson City Athletic Association to sing "God Save the King" and declared his support for the war. Boyle took an ultra-patriotic line, declaring that if any of his employees expressed any sympathy for the enemy, they would be fired immediately. His greatest disappointment came when his attempt to volunteer for the Canadian Expeditionary Force (CEF) was turned down on the account of his age, being informed at 46 he was too old for the CEF.

During World War I, Boyle organised a machine gun company, giving the soldiers insignia made of gold, to fight in Europe. In 1914, he wrote Sam Hughes, the minister of national defense, offering to raise at his own expense the machine gun company made up of Yukon miners. The company was trained in Dawson City under the direction of the local Royal Northwest Mounted Police detachment and the Dawson City Rifle Association and later received more professional military training when it reached Vancouver. Boyle was present at the parade on 27 October 1914 when the company left Dawson City for Vancouver. Morale problems began in the winter of 1914-1915 when the unit was not deployed to Europe immediately as promised, and were indeed not officially accepted as part of the Canadian Expeditionary Force until 18 February 1915. Boyle wrote several letters to Hughes warning that with the unit living in tents in Hastings Park it would wither away due to desertion if kept there much longer, and finally on 11 June 1915 the "Boyle Battery" boarded a ship for Britain. On 19 June 1915, a puzzled Boyle wrote to Hughes asking why he had not been presented with the invoice for the costs of raising the "Boyle battery" and for the purchasing machine guns, insisting he wanted to pay these costs out of his pocket. Only later did Boyle realize that Hughes had promoted such a chaotic mobilization that he had forgotten that Boyle was supposed to pay for the costs of raising the "Boyle Battery" himself. The unit was incorporated into larger units of the Canadian Army.

On 27 July 1916, Boyle left Dawson City for London with the intention of negotiating a deal with the South African Goldfields Company to operate a gold-mining concession in Russia. Boyle was especially interested in the gold fields around the Lena river in Siberia owing to the similarities between Siberia and the Yukon. Hughes was visiting London in August 1916 when Boyle arrived, and thus Boyle finally met the bombastic Defense Minister whom he had corresponding with since August 1914. In September 1916, Hughes appointed Boyle an honorary lieutenant colonel of the militia, allowing Boyle to wear a uniform which he embellished by adding in maple leafs made of Yukon gold. In London, Boyle also met in London a prominent American engineer and businessman, Herbert Hoover, who was a member of the American Committee of Engineers and who had much money invested in Russia. In June 1917, Boyle undertook a mission to Russia on behalf of the American Committee of Engineers in London to help reorganize the country's railway system. Boyle arrived in Petrograd (modern St. Petersburg) on 25 June 1917. In December 1917, he successfully petitioned the new Bolshevik government of Russia to return archives and paper currency from the Kremlin to Romania.

=== In service of Romania ===
In February 1918 he served as the principal intermediary on behalf of the Romanian government in effecting a ceasefire with revolutionary forces in Bessarabia. On 23 February 1918, when Romania was on the brink of defeat, Boyle first met Queen Marie, who was lying dejected on her sofa as she heard the news that Romania had asked for an armistice with Germany. Although Marie was only a queen consort, she was vastly more popular with the Romanian people than her husband, King Ferdinand. At the time she vowed: "My English blood refuses to accept disaster. If there remains the smallest, most meagre fighting chance, I shall fight on-a losing battle no doubt, but I shall consider myself unworthy of my own ideals were I to give in before I am completely convinced that all is lost". Boyle's arrival at the Romanian court and his promise as he got on his knees to shake the queen's hand and to swear that he would never abandon her did much to lift her spirits. Marie later wrote of him: "I can honestly say that during that dark period of my life, Joe Boyle kept me from despairing...This strong, self-reliant man had been my rock on a stormy sea". One biographer of Queen Marie wrote of him: "An exaggeration of a man, Colonel Boyle reads today like a fictional hero created by his contemporaries to lighten the frustrations of defeat. Were it not for the corroborating memoirs of his partner, Captain George A. Hill of the British Secret Service, we would write Boyle off as the wish fulfillment of a desperate queen looking for a twentieth-century version of Lancelot". Boyle, in cooperation with Captain George Hill, a Russian-speaking member of the British secret service, carried out clandestine operations against German and Bolshevik forces in Bessarabia and southwestern Russia. Just one of their many exploits together had been secreting the Romanian crown jewels and Romanian treasury out of the Kremlin and back into Romania. In March–April 1918, he rescued some 50 high-ranking Romanians held in Odessa by revolutionaries. This made Boyle a national hero in Romania and gave him influence within its royal court.

At a time when defeatism was rampant in Romania, Boyle together with Queen Marie and her lover, Prince Barbu Știrbey were the main advocates that the Allies would still win the war. Over the queen's strong opposition, Romania signed on 7 May 1918 the humiliating Treaty of Bucharest. One of the terms of the Treaty of Bucharest was that German civil servants were to be placed in charge of every Romanian ministry with the power to veto decisions by Romanian cabinet ministers and to fire Romanian civil servants, a clause which effectively stripped Romania of its independence and turned it into a German protectorate. Other terms of the treaty subjected Romania to a ruthless policy of economic exploitation, which caused living standards in Romania to collapse. Marie spent much of her fortune on charity attempting to assist her destitute people, an endeavour in which Boyle joined in, spending much of his own fortune on charity. Adding to Marie's woes, on 31 August 1918, the Crown Prince Carol, whose debauchery and dissolute ways had often worried her, impulsively deserted his Romanian Army unit and eloped to marry in Odessa Zizi Lambrino. Marie was strongly opposed to her son's marriage to Lambrino and feared the fact he had deserted his unit would discredit the monarchy. Boyle provided the queen much emotional support as she later wrote that Carol's actions were "a staggering family tragedy which hit us suddenly, a stunning blow for which we were entirely unprepared. I felt myself very sick. Carol! My honest big boy, at such a moment when the country is in such a state, when all our moral courage is needed, when we, the Royal Family, are the only thing that holds it together. I was completely crushed. Only Boyle and Barbu knew".

Boyle advised Marie to be strict with Carol, who technically could have been executed for desertion, arguing that if Carol was not punished in some way, then the monarchy would be discredited with the Romanian people. Boyle realized that as the Romanian Army had executed a number of men for desertion during the war that to allow Carol to escape unpunished for doing the same thing that commoners were executed for would ruin the prestige of the monarchy. Carol was banished to a remote Orthodox monastery located high up in the Carpathian Mountains with instructions that he would be released only after he agreed to annul his marriage to the commoner Zambrino and publicly apologise for deserting his unit. Marie visited the monastery to inform him that King Ferdinand was planning to exclude him from the succession unless he met their conditions. When Marie could not convince Carol that she was serious with this threat, Boyle visited Carol at the monastery on her behalf and was more successful. When Boyle returned to tell the queen that Carol had agreed, she wrote: "Boyle was as near tears as a man can be, it was a cruel and sickening victory...Nando [her pet name for Ferdinand] and I both thanked Boyle with emotion".

On 8 November 1918, Romania renounced the Treaty of Bucharest and declared war again on the Austrian Empire and Germany, thus technically making Romania one of the victorious allies. Though Romania was finally able to gain Transylvania, Marie confessed to Boyle that she was highly worried about the future, writing to him: "The main dangers and difficulties are, it seems, the famine danger and a strong Bolshevik propaganda conducted by the Germans in the occupied territories, a ruthless propaganda because they carry with them whatever could be carried, and the empty stomach doesn't reason. The theory is: if they fall, they want Romania to sink first, to be totally destroyed under all aspects; but we don't want it destroyed, do we?" Marie was the driving force behind the promise issued by King Ferdinand that to reward his subjects for their wartime suffering, then postwar Romania would pursue land reform, breaking up the estates of the boyars (nobility) to provide land for their peasants and provide universal suffrage.

At the Paris Peace Conference in 1919 Boyle was instrumental in helping Romania to obtain a $25-million credit from the Canadian government. He was awarded the special title of "Saviour of Romania". On the Queen's behalf, Boyle organized millions of dollars of Canadian relief for Romanians, earning the title of hero. He was decorated for his exploits by the governments of Tsarist Russia, France, Britain and Romania. Queen Marie, who was notably fond of him, made him the Duke of Jassy.

He remained a close friend, and was at one time a possible lover of the Romanian Queen, British-born Marie of Edinburgh (better known as Marie of Romania). His relationship with the queen remains something of a mystery.

== Death ==
Boyle died at "Wayside" in St James's Road, Hampton Hill, on 14 April 1923. His remains were buried in the churchyard of St James's on 17 April 1923. Boyle's remains were re-interred in his Canadian home town of Woodstock, Ontario in 1983, in a full military funeral.

== In fiction ==
In the 2018 historical novel The Romanov Empress by C.W. Gortner, Boyle presents himself to Dowager Empress Maria Feodorovna at Yalta—as a Canadian White Army colonel—with news that George V is sending a British battleship HMS Marlborough to rescue the remaining Romanovs.

In the novel, Boyle claims to have been in Yekaterinburg where he learned first-hand of the death of Nicholas II and his family—and is the first to report it to the tsar's mother. He also reported the death of her other son, Grand Duke Michael.

In the graphic novel Sous le soleil de minuit, published in 2015 by writer Juan Díaz Canales and artist Rubén Pellejero, Joe Boyle accompanies Corto Maltese in 1915 in his Alaskan adventure.

Boyle is a character in the 2012 historical novel, The Romanov Conspiracy by Glenn Meade. He is also a character in the 2019 Romanian feature film Queen Marie of Romania, played by Scottish actor Robert Cavanah.

== Awards ==
- Distinguished Service Order - England
- Croix de Guerre - France
- Order of the Star of Romania (Grand Cross) - Romania
- Order of the Crown of Romania (Commander) - Romania
- Order of Regina Maria - Romania
- Order of St. Vladimir, 4th Class - Russia
- Order of St. Anne, 4th Class - Russia
- Order of St. Stanislaus, 2nd Class - Russia

== Books and articles ==
- Duguay, Gilles (1998). Joe Boyle: un mousquetaire canadien au service de la Reine Marie de Roumanie. Kemah, Texas: BIC Alliance.
- Gelardi, Julia P. (2007). Born to Rule: Five Reigning Consorts, Granddaughters of Queen Victoria. New York: St. Martin's Press. ISBN 978-1429904551.
- Kitchen, Martin (April 1976). "Hindenburg, Ludendorff and Romania". The Slavonic and East European Review. 54 (2): 214–222.
- Sauerwein, Stan (2003). Klondike Joe Boyle: Heroic Adventures from Gold Fields to Battlefields. Victoria: Heritage House Publishing Co. ISBN 1551539691.
- Waite, Donald (2015). British Columbia and Yukon Gold Hunters: A History in Photographs. Victoria: Heritage House Publishing. ISBN 978-1772030778.
- Berton, Pierre (2004). Prisoners of the North. Canada: Anchor Canada. ISBN 978-0385660471.
