= Indigenous peoples in Yukon =

Indigenous peoples of Yukon, Canada

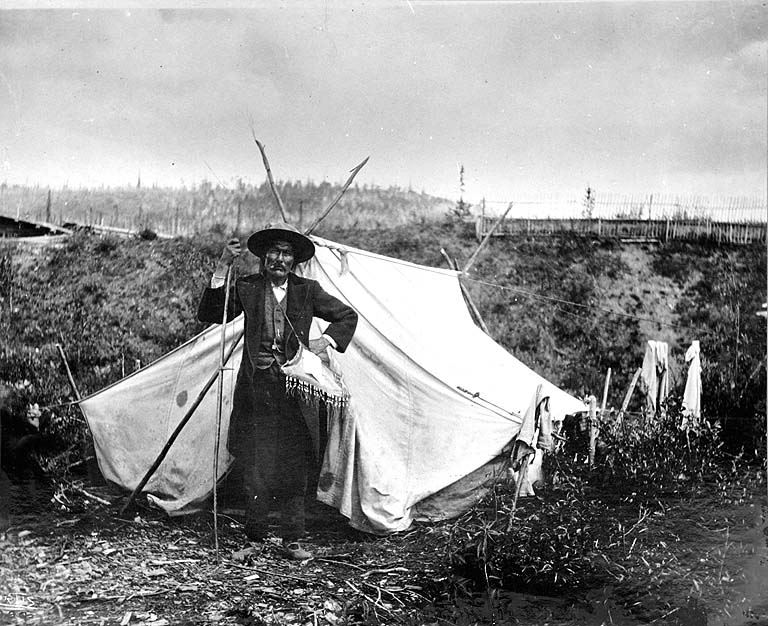
Chief Isaac of Hän, near Dawson City, Yukon

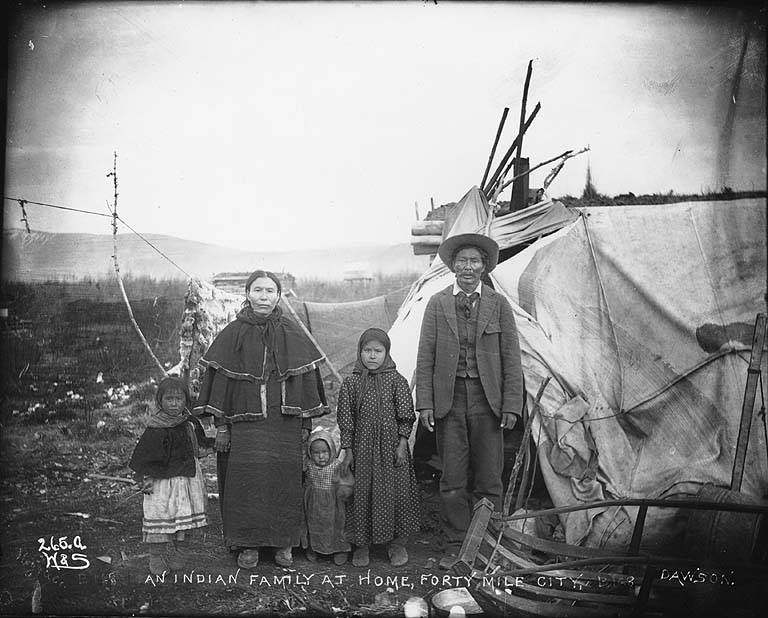
Han or Gwichʼin family outside home, Forty Mile City, Yukon, ca. 1899

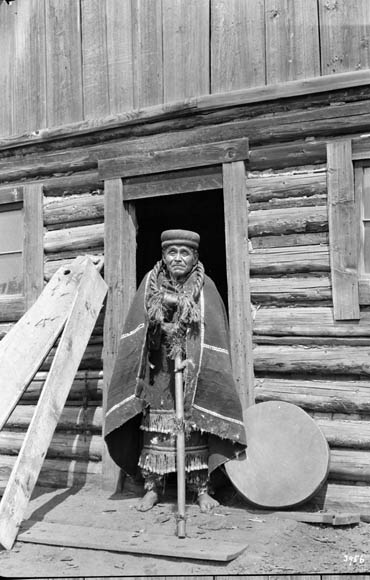
Charlie Skookum, a Tagish medicine man

The Indigenous peoples of Yukon are ethnic groups who, prior to European contact, occupied the former countries now collectively known as Yukon. While most First Nations in the Canadian territory are a part of the wider Dene Nation, there are Tlingit and Métis nations that blend into the wider spectrum of indigeneity across Canada. Traditionally hunter-gatherers, indigenous peoples and their associated nations retain close connections to the land, the rivers and the seasons of their respective countries or homelands. Their histories are recorded and passed down the generations through oral traditions. European contact and invasion brought many changes to the native cultures of Yukon including land loss and non-traditional governance and education. However, indigenous people in Yukon continue to foster their connections with the land in seasonal wage labour such as fishing and trapping. Today, indigenous groups aim to maintain and develop indigenous languages, traditional or culturally-appropriate forms of education, cultures, spiritualities and indigenous rights.

== Population ==
Estimates of the indigenous population of the Yukon region at the beginning of the 19th century vary greatly. Some historians estimated that about 8,000 people lived in the area. While other estimates were between 7,000 and 8,000 people. One estimate put the number at more than 9,000 people. Another estimate showed that by the year 1830, the number of indigenous people was about 4,700.

== Nations ==
Inhabited by six principal tribes: the Gwichʼin, the Hän, the Kaska Dena, the Tagish, the Northern and Southern Tutchone, and the Tlingit (Teslin), there are also Métis, though unrecognized politically, and Inuvialuit, who, through the Inuvialuit Settlement Region, maintain connections to certain territories of Yukon.

The Gwichʼin homeland encompasses the basins of the Peel River and the Porcupine River. Relatives of the Gwichʼin, the Hän, live at the middle reach of the Yukon River at the border with Alaska. The Northern Tutchone inhabit central Yukon in the basins of the Pelly River and Stewart River. In a basin of the Liard River in the southeast live the Kaska Dena, and, in the south, near lakes in the upper course of the Yukon River live the Tagish, who are related to the Kaska Dena. In the southwest are the Southern Tutchone and, in the river heads of the White River, is the White River First Nation, an Upper Tanana speaking peoples.

In the south, along the Teslin River, are continental Tlingit (Teslin), whose language, together with the Athabaskan languages, is included in the Na-Dene language family.

== Language ==
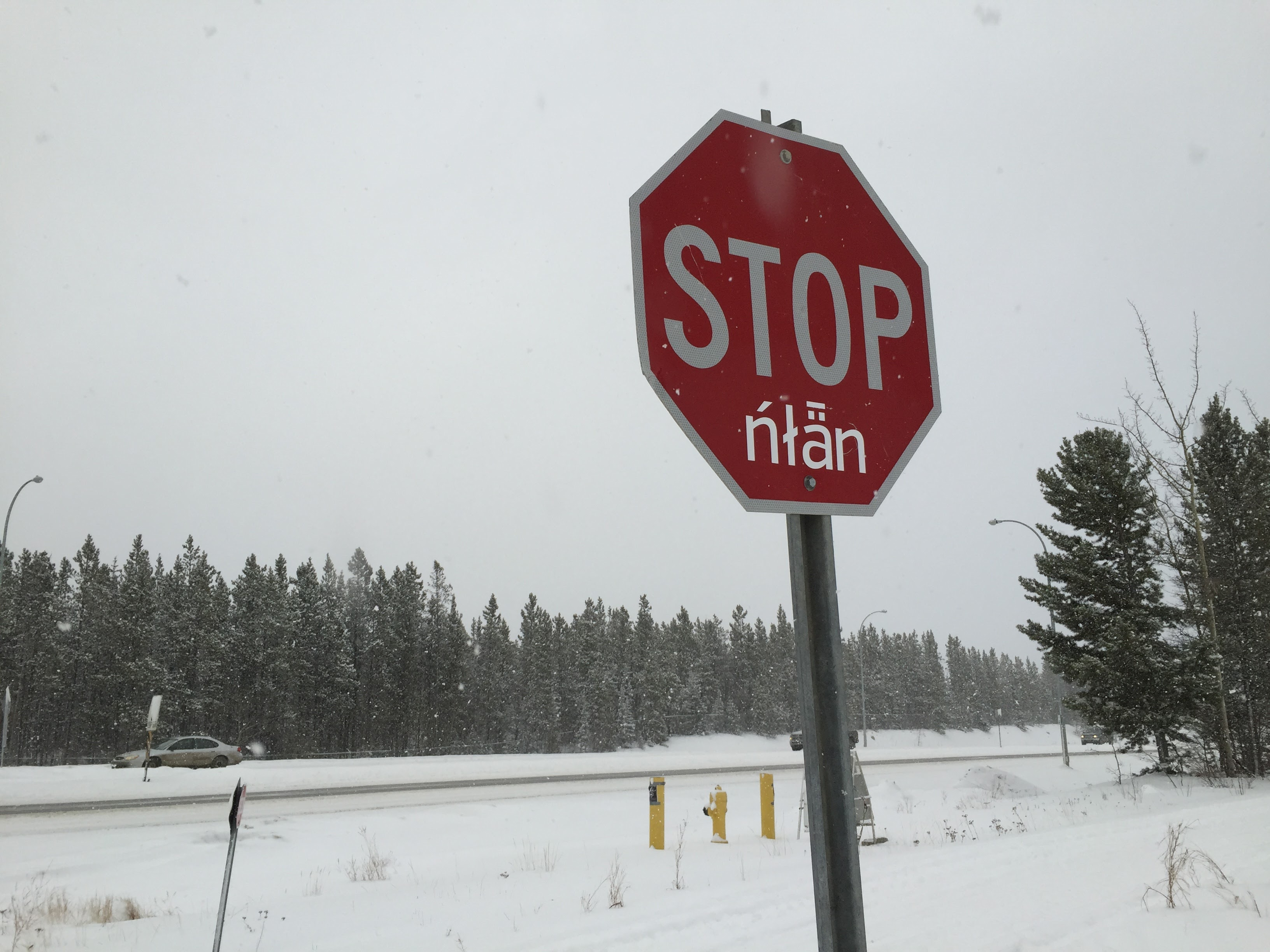
ńłǟn, a Southern Tutchone word, added to stop signs in the McIntyre subdivision of Whitehorse. It means, “stop that now,” as there is no exact translation. This initiative is to promote the Southern Tutchone language.

The pre-contact peoples of Yukon spoke dialects within the Athabaskan languages, which are still spoken to this day. The Athabaskan languages themselves are a subset of the Na-Dene language family. The Cree Syllabary that was developed by the Methodist missionary, James Evans, was adapted for use in the Yukon. Missionaries of many Christian denominations wrote dictionaries, grammars and religious texts in the indigenous languages, often with the assistance of translators.

== Traditions ==
The Indigenous peoples of the Yukon have a land based oral tradition. The people were and, in many cases, still are hunters and gatherers, skilled in following the season changes in food sources. Fishing and trapping in the valleys remain fruitful, as specific prey can be followed to higher areas.

Knowledge about many aspects of pre contact tradition such as animal behaviour, land use, subsistence, textiles, language and spirituality comes from the oral history of indigenous people and from the work of scientists such as archeologists and anthropologists.

== European contact ==
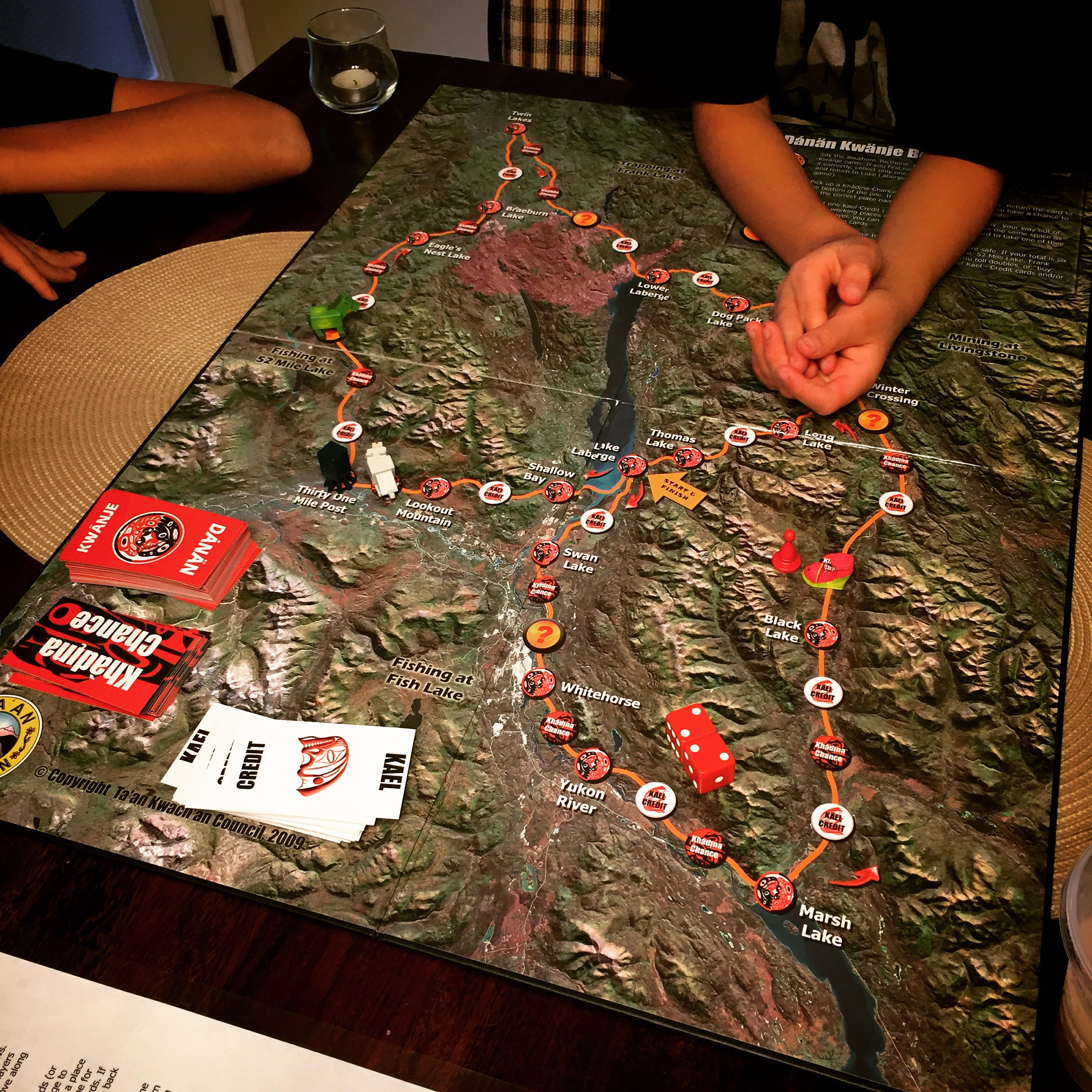
Southern Tutchone board game

Contact between the indigenous peoples of the Yukon and European fur traders began in the 1840s. The Hudson's Bay Company entered the area of the Yukon around that time.

Through the 1800s, indigenous people, such as the Hän, along the Alaska-Yukon border trapped for furs to trade for European manufactured items.

The Klondike Gold Rush of 1896 was a seminal moment in post contact history of the indigenous people of the Yukon. Not only did the influx of Europeans bring new diseases, missionary movements and European consumer items but also the indigenous peoples found a role as guides, packers and chandlers for prospectors.

In 1898, the increased European population led to formalisation of governance in the formation of Yukon.

== Indigenous land claims ==
In a step towards Aboriginal title, the Yukon Indian Advancement Association was formed in the late 1960s. In 1970, the Yukon Native Brotherhood was founded, commencing a land claims movement. In 1973, the Together Today for Our Children Tomorrow petition was presented by Elijah Smith to the prime minister Pierre Trudeau.

In 1990, the Yukon Final Umbrella Agreement was completed.

== Twenty-first century ==
At the 2016 Canadian census, there were 8,195 indigenous people. Of those people who gave a response indicating that they were of one indigenous group, 6,685 were First Nations, 1,015 were Métis and 230 were Inuit. A further 160 gave multiple indigenous responses with another 105 indicating some other indigenous background. In the 2012 Youth identities, localities, and visual material Culture, K. Eglinton said only twelve percent were fluent in the language of their nation. Fourteen First Nations represented eight language groups. In 1991, an ongoing program for preservation of these languages was begun in Voices of the Talking Circle, the proceedings of the Yukon Aboriginal Language Services which emphasised that the people are the proper stewards of their languages and maintaining a critical mass of fluent speakers is essential.

== First Nations ==
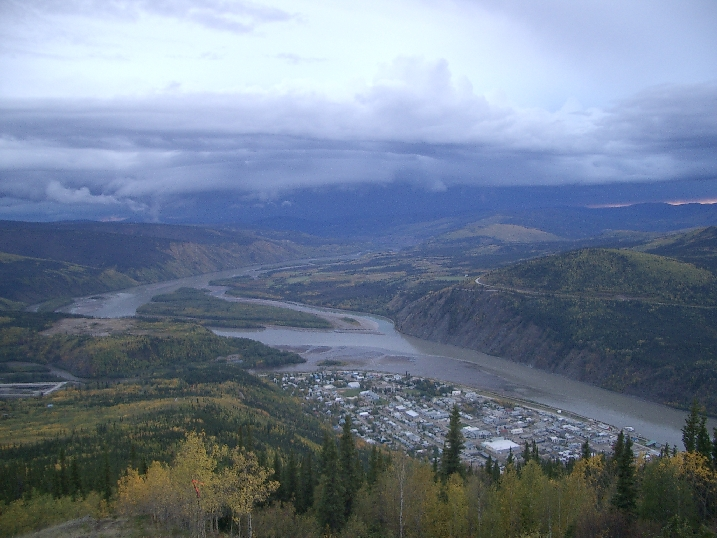
Tr'ochëk above Dawson City

This is a list of the fourteen First Nations of indigenous people of Yukon. Indigenous and Northern Affairs Canada (INAC) lists the Aishihik and Champagne as separate First Nations in addition to the Champagne and Aishihik First Nations.

- Carcross/Tagish First Nation
- Champagne and Aishihik First Nations
- First Nation of Na-Cho Nyäk Dun
- Kluane First Nation
- Kwanlin Dün First Nation
- Liard First Nation
- Little Salmon/Carmacks First Nation
- Ross River Dena Council
- Selkirk First Nation
- Ta’an Kwäch’än Council
- Tr’ondëk Hwëch’in
- Teslin Tlingit Council
- Vuntut Gwitchin First Nation
- White River First Nation

Of these, all but Liard River First Nation, Ross River Dena Council, and White River First Nation have signed Final Agreements and are now self-governing.

In addition the Government of Yukon and INAC list the following groups as having a presence in Yukon.

- Gwich'in Tribal Council
- Tetlit Gwich’in Council
- Inuvialuit (an Inuit group whose land claims extend into Yukon)
- Acho Dene Koe First Nation
- Kaska Dena Council
- Taku River Tlingit First Nation
- Tahltan Central Council

=== Languages ===
According to Yukon Government the following indigenous languages are spoken in the territory. However, unlike the other two territories in Northern Canada, the Northwest Territories and Nunavut, there are no Canadian indigenous languages that have official status.

- Gwichʼin language
- Hän language
- Kaska language
- Northern Tutchone language
- Southern Tutchone language
- Tagish language
- Upper Tanana language
- Tlingit language

=== Settlements ===
First Nations peoples live throughout Yukon. Some places that are primarily First Nations include:

- Aishihik
- Beaver Creek
- Burwash Landing
- Carcross
- Shäwshe (Dalton Post)
- Fort Selkirk
- Haines Junction
- Mayo
- Old Crow
- Pelly Crossing
- Ross River
- Teslin
- Upper Liard
- Watson Lake

=== Indigenous land ===
There has never been an indigenous reserve in the Yukon, of the 14 nations in the Yukon, 11 are self-governed nation, below is a list of indigenous land.

Name as used by Indigenous and Northern Affairs Canada	First Nation(s)	Ethnic/national group	Tribal council	Treaty	Area		Population			Notes
Name as used by Indigenous and Northern Affairs Canada	First Nation(s)	Ethnic/national group	Tribal council	Treaty	ha	acre	2016	2011	% difference	Notes
Carcross 4	Carcross/Tagish	Tlingit / Tagish	—	n/a	64.8	160.1	35	53	-34.0%	Listed by Statistics Canada as self-government
Haines Junction	Aishihik / Champagne and Aishihik	Southern Tutchone	Southern Tutchone Tribal Council	n/a						(Note: INAC lists the Aishihik and Champagne as separate First Nations in addition to the Champagne and Aishihik First Nations.)
Lake Laberge 1	Ta'an Kwach'an	Southern Tutchone	Southern Tutchone Tribal Council	n/a	129.6	320.2	25	20	25.0%	Listed by Statistics Canada as self-government
Mayo 6	First Nation of Nacho Nyak Dun	Northern Tutchone	—	n/a	184.5	455.9				
Mcquesten 3	First Nation of Nacho Nyak Dun	Northern Tutchone	—	n/a	129.6	320.2				
Moosehide Creek 2	Tr'ondëk Hwëch'in	Hän	—	n/a	64.1	158.4	0	0		Listed by Statistics Canada as self-government
Moosehide Creek 2b	Tr'ondëk Hwëch'in	Hän	—	n/a	346.8	857.0				
Nisutlin 14	Teslin Tlingit Council	Tlingit	—	n/a	83.9	207.3				
Nisutlin Bay 15	Teslin Tlingit Council	Tlingit	—	n/a	50.0	123.6				
Selkirk 7	Selkirk	Northern Tutchone	—	n/a	64.7	159.9				
Teslin Post 13	Teslin Tlingit Council	Tlingit	—	n/a	27.6	68.2	139	138	0.7%	Listed by Statistics Canada as self-government
Whitehorse 8	Kwanlin Dun First Nation	Tlingit / Tagish / Southern Tutchone	Southern Tutchone Tribal Council	n/a	108.4	267.9				

=== Indigenous settlements ===
Places listed as indigenous settlements include:

Name as used by Indigenous and Northern Affairs Canada	First Nation(s)	Ethnic/national group	Tribal council	Treaty	Area		Population			Notes
Name as used by Indigenous and Northern Affairs Canada	First Nation(s)	Ethnic/national group	Tribal council	Treaty	ha	acre	2016	2011	% difference	Notes
Champagne Landing 10	Champagne / Champagne and Aishihik	Southern Tutchone	Southern Tutchone Tribal Council	n/a			20	25	-20.0%	(Note: INAC lists the Aishihik and Champagne as separate First Nations in addition to the Champagne and Aishihik First Nations.) Indian settlement
Kloo Lake Settlement	Aishihik / Champagne and Aishihik	Southern Tutchone	Southern Tutchone Tribal Council	n/a			0	0		Indian settlement
Klukshu River Settlement	Champagne / Champagne and Aishihik	Southern Tutchone	Southern Tutchone Tribal Council	n/a			0	0		Indian settlement
Two and One-Half Mile Village	Liard River First Nation	Kaska Dena	Kaska Tribal Council	n/a						Population included with Two Mile Village Indian settlement
Two Mile Village	Liard River First Nation	Kaska Dena	Kaska Tribal Council	n/a			188	203	-7.4	Indian settlement

=== Historic sites and parks ===
Historic First Nations sites include Fort Reliance, Forty Mile, Klukshu, Little Salmon, Moosehide, Takhini Hot Springs.

Kluane National Park and Reserve lies in Champagne and Aishihik First Nations and Kluane First Nation lands and is managed by them and Parks Canada with advice from the Kluane National Park Management Board.

Vuntut National Park was established in 1995 as part of the Vuntut Gwitchin First Nation Final Agreement. It is located in northern Yukon and lies adjacent to Ivvavik National Park and the Arctic National Wildlife Refuge in Alaska. The park also includes part of the Old Crow Flats.

Tr'ochëk is a historical Hän fishing site. Chief Isaac, (pictured top right) of the Trʼondëk Hwëchʼin First Nation had a camp here during the Klondike Gold Rush. It is located at the confluence of the Klondike and Yukon Rivers.

Other territorial parks that reflect First Nations heritage are:

Name	Associated First Nations	Location	Reference
Agay Mene Territorial Park (proposed)	Carcross/Tagish First Nation	Atlin Road	
Asi Keyi Territorial Park (proposed)	Kluane First Nation / White River First Nation	Donjek River / Kluane Range	
Ch’ihilii Chìk Habitat Protection Area	Vuntut Gwitchin First Nation	Between Old Crow and Fort McPherson	
Ddhaw Ghro Habitat Protection Area	Selkirk First Nation / First Nation of Na-Cho Nyak Dun	Between the Pelly and Stewart Rivers	
Devil's Elbow and Big Island Habitat Protection Areas	First Nation of Na-Cho Nyak Dun	Stewart River near Mayo	
Dàadzàii Vàn Territorial Park (proposed)	Vuntut Gwitchin First Nation / Tetlit Gwich'in First Nation	Summit Lake / Bell River	
Kusawa Territorial Park	Carcross/Tagish First Nation / Champagne and Aishihik First Nations / Kwanlin Dün First Nation	Kusawa Lake	
Łútsäw Wetland Habitat Protection Area	Selkirk First Nation	8 km (5.0 mi) southwest of Pelly Crossing	
Mandanna Lake	Little Salmon/Carmacks First Nation	Little Salmon	
Ni'iinlii'njik (Fishing Branch) Territorial Park	Vuntut Gwitchin First Nation	Between Dawson City and Old Crow	
Nuna K’óhonete Yédäk Tah’é (Horseshoe Slough) Habitat Protection Area	First Nation of Na-Cho Nyak Dun	70 km (43 mi) upstream of Mayo	
Pickhandle Lakes Habitat Protection Area	Kluane First Nation / White River First Nation	Shakwak Trench, between Burwash Landing and Beaver Creek	
Ta'tla Mun Special Management Area	Selkirk First Nation	40 km (25 mi) southeast of Pelly Crossing	
Tagish River Habitat Protection Area	Carcross/Tagish First Nation	Between Marsh Lake and Tagish Lake	
Tombstone Territorial Park	Tr'ondëk Hwëch'in First Nation	Kilometre 71.5 on the Dempster Highway	
Tsâwnjik Chu (Nordenskiold) Habitat Protection Area	Little Salmon/Carmacks First Nation	Nordenskiold River south of Carmacks	
Van Tat K’atr’anahtii (Old Crow Flats) Special Management Area	Vuntut Gwitchin First Nation	Old Crow Flats	

== Inuvialuit ==
Although the Inuvialuit no longer reside in Yukon they did traditionally. The Inuit and their ancestors lived on Herschel Island and the coast of the Arctic Ocean. In 1984 they signed the Inuvialuit Final Agreement with the Government of Canada and this led to the creation of two parks.

Herschel Island, in the Beaufort Sea, was originally occupied by the Thule people, ancestors of the Inuvialuit, it is part of the Inuvialuit Settlement Region and home to Qikiqtaruk Territorial Park.

Ivvavik National Park, also an important area to First Nations, was created as part of the Inuvialuit Final Agreement. The park was established in response to oil exploration in the Beaufort and the proposed Mackenzie Valley Pipeline.
