= Northern Tutchone language =

Athabaskan language

Northern Tutchone
- Dän kʼí
- Native to: Canada
- Region: Yukon
- Ethnicity: Northern Tutchone people
- Native speakers: (200 cited 1995)
- Language family: Na-Dené: Athabaskan–Eyak; Athabaskan; Northern Athabaskan; Northern Tutchone

Language codes
- ISO 639-3: ttm
- Glottolog: nort2941
- ELP: Northern Tutchone

- Northern Tutchone is classified as Definitely Endangered by the UNESCO Atlas of the World's Languages in Danger.

Northern Tutchone is an Athabaskan language of southern Yukon in Canada. Although they are sometimes considered separate languages, Northern and Southern Tutchone speakers are generally able to understand each other in conversation, albeit with moderate difficulty.

Northern Tutchone is spoken in the Yukon communities of Mayo, Pelly Crossing, Stewart Crossing, Carmacks, and Beaver Creek.

The Northern Tutchone language is threatened. In the 2011 census, Northern Tutchone was reported to have 210 speakers, with most speakers considered elderly. However, language revitalization programs hosted by the Yukon Native Language Centre and within communities themselves are underway.

== Dialects ==
- Big Salmon dialect
- Pelly Crossing dialect
- Mayo dialect (spoken by First Nation of Na-Cho Nyak Dun)
- Snag dialect (spoken by White River First Nation)

== Phonology ==
The consonants and vowels of Northern Tutchone and their orthography are as follows:

=== Consonants ===
		Labial	Inter- dental	Alveolar			Post- alveolar	Retro- flex	Velar		Glottal
		Labial	Inter- dental	plain	sibilant	lateral	Post- alveolar	Retro- flex	plain	labial	Glottal
Nasal		m ⟨m⟩		n ⟨n⟩							
Plosive/ Affricate	plain		tθ ⟨ddh⟩	t ⟨d⟩	ts ⟨dz⟩	tɬ ⟨dl⟩	tʃ ⟨j⟩		k ⟨g⟩	kʷ ⟨gw⟩	ʔ ⟨ʼ⟩
Plosive/ Affricate	aspirated		tθʰ ⟨tth⟩	tʰ ⟨t⟩	tsʰ ⟨ts⟩	tɬʰ ⟨tl⟩	tʃʰ ⟨ch⟩		kʰ ⟨k⟩	kʷʰ ⟨kw⟩	
Plosive/ Affricate	ejective		tθʼ ⟨tth’⟩	tʼ ⟨t’⟩	tsʼ ⟨ts’⟩	tɬʼ ⟨tl’⟩	tʃʼ ⟨ch’⟩		kʼ ⟨k’⟩	kʷʼ ⟨kw’⟩	
Plosive/ Affricate	prenasalized	ᵐb ⟨mb⟩		ⁿd ⟨nd⟩			ⁿdʒ ⟨nj⟩				
Fricative	voiceless		θ ⟨th⟩		s ⟨s⟩	ɬ ⟨ł⟩	ʃ ⟨sh⟩		x ⟨kh⟩	xʷ ⟨khw⟩	h ⟨h⟩
Fricative	voiced		ð ⟨dh⟩		z ⟨z⟩	ɮ ⟨l⟩	ʒ ⟨zh⟩		ɣ ⟨gh⟩	ɣʷ ⟨ghw⟩	
Approximant							j ⟨y⟩	ɻ ⟨r⟩		w ⟨w⟩	

=== Vowels ===
	Front	Central	Back
High	i ⟨i⟩		u ⟨u⟩
Mid	e ⟨e⟩	ʌ ⟨ä⟩	o ⟨o⟩
Low	ɑ ⟨a⟩		

Vowels are differentiated for nasalization and high/low tone. Where there is a glottal stop, the word must take a high tone, but the inverse is not necessarily true.

== Writing system ==
The first instance of a written orthography for Northern Tutchone is from the 1890s expeditions by Archdeacon Thomas Canham, who was stationed at Fort Selkirk for several years. However, the widespread orthography today was developed by John Ritter in 1970-1980. Like many writing systems, it uses the letters for voiced obstruents (e.g.: ⟨d⟩, ⟨dz⟩) to represent unaspirated sounds (/t/ and /ts/ respectively).

The glottal stop /ʔ/ is marked by a single quotation mark ⟨'⟩, nasalised vowels are either written with an ⟨n⟩ or an ogonek (e.g.: ⟨ą⟩).

Generally, only high tone is marked with an acute accent (⟨á⟩), and the low tone is assumed default.

== In popular culture ==
Jerry Alfred's "Etsi Shon" (Grandfather song), sung in Northern Tuchone, won a Juno Award in the Best Aboriginal Album category in 1996.
