= Northern Tutchone =

Dän k'í

Regions with significant populations
- Canada (Yukon)

Languages
- Tutchone

Religion
- Christianity, Animism

Related ethnic groups
- Southern Tutchone

Dän "person"
- People: Dän K'í
- Language: Dän Kʼí
- Country: Dän Kezhi, Denendeh

The Northern Tutchone, or Dän k'í, is an Athabaskan-speaking First Nation who primarily lived in the central Yukon in Western Canada.

== Language ==
The Northern Tutchone language, originally spoken by the Northern Tutchone people, is a variety of the Tutchone language, part of the Athabaskan language family.

Thomas Canham, an Anglican priest, documented in the language in the 1890s and published the Wood Indian Dictionary in 1898. John Ritter of the Yukon Native Language Centre developed an orthography for the language in the late 20th century.

Several Northern Tutchone communities teach Northern Tutchone in schools, and Carmacks has a preschool program.

== Territories ==
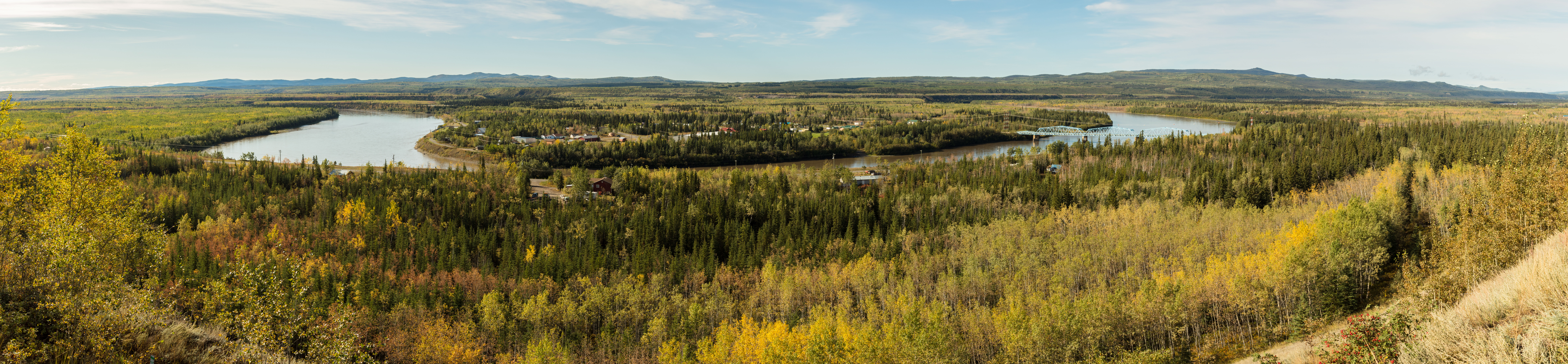
Pelly Crossing and Pelly River, Northern Tutchone historical homelands

Northern Tutchone communities include Beaver Creek, Carmacks, Mayo, Pelly Crossing, and Stewart Crossing.

Northern Tutchone people have historically hunted and fished from the McQuesten and Stewart Rivers to the Big Salmon River. The Selwyn Mountains marked the eastern boundary of their historical harvesting lands.

== Society ==
Northern Tutchone societies are communal and organized into two matrilineal moeities: the Wolf and Crow.

== First Nations ==
Northern Tutchone First Nations governments and communities include:

- First Nation of Na-Cho Nyäk Dun, Mayo, Yukon, Na-Cho Nyäk Dun, which translates to "Big River People" because they called the Stewart River Na Cho Nyak, meaning Big River. They are the northern most Northern Tutchone First Nation
- Little Salmon/Carmacks First Nation, Carmacks, Yukon, Tagé Cho Hudän which translates to "Big River People"
- Selkirk First Nation, Pelly Crossing, Yukon, Hućha Hudän, which translates to "Flatland People" because of the landscape in Fort Selkirk, where the river valley is flat
- White River First Nation, Beaver Creek, Yukon

== Notable Northern Tutchone ==
- Jerry Alfred, song-keeper who keeps the language alive through his music
- Roddy Blackjack (c. 1927–2013), chief of the Little Salmon/Carmacks First Nation
- Eric Fairclough, cabinet minister and Leader of the Official Opposition in the Yukon Legislative Assembly, chief of the Little Salmon/Carmacks First Nation
- Jeremy Harper, band councillor of the Selkirk First Nation, member of the Yukon Legislative Assembly
- Danny Joe, chief of the Selkirk First Nation, member of the Yukon Legislative Assembly
- Louise Profeit-LeBlanc (Na-Cho Nyäk Dun), storyteller, artist, author, choreographer
