= Krystle Silverfox =

Krystle Coughlin Silverfox is an interdisciplinary artist and Northern Tutchone member of the Selkirk First Nation (Wolf Clan). She currently lives and works in Whitehorse, Yukon, though she also spent a significant period in the Tr’ondëk Hwëch’in in Dawson City, Yukon. Her practice combines Northwest Coast Formline elements with digital photography, scenography and traditional collage through an Indigenous feminist, de-colonial, and activist lens.

== Education ==
Silverfox grew up in British Columbia, where she completed a B.A. in Gender, Race, Sexuality, and Social Justice at the University of British Columbia in 2013. The degree was shortly followed by the completion of a B.F.A. at UBC in 2015. In 2019, Silverfox graduated with an M.F.A. in Interdisciplinary Studies at Simon Frazer University (SFU).

At SFU, Silverfox's final project was an artwork titled All That Glitters is Not Gold. In the work, the artist utilizes a Hudson's Bay Company blanket in reference to Fort Selkirk which was historically a trading post and important site for the Selkirk First Nation. The upper half of the blanket is stretched across a wooden frame, built from discarded SFU construction materials. The lower half of the blanket unravels, leaving long threads hanging down to meet the floor where copper coins puddle. The pennies allude to the copper deposits in Northern Tutchone Territories, which were being mined by Goldcorp—a major funder of SFU's School for the Contemporary Arts. Grappling with identity, land and resource extraction, Silverfox contemplates and meditates on where value is extracted, who benefits the most from it, and what historical circumstances led to this tangle of interests.

== Career ==
The artist was commissioned to create work for Capture Photography Festival in Vancouver, British Columbia, and public artwork for the city of Richmond, British Columbia. Silverfox was a finalist in the RBC Painting Competition (2018), the Lind Prize (2018, 2020), the Saltspring National Art Prize (2019), and the Yukon Prize for Visual Arts (2021).

She has completed a number of artist initiatives and residencies including the Institute of American Indian Arts's Residency Program in Santa Fe, New Mexico (2023); the Arctic Arts Summit; Shakaat Artist Residency Program hosted by the Kwalin Dün Cultural Centre in Whitehorse, Yukon (2020–2021); the AGO X RBC Emerging Artists Exchange (2021); and the Banff Centre's Emerging Visual Artist Intensive (2023).

Silverfox was a shortlisted recipient of the 2022 Sobey Art Award. The artist received a $25,000 reward and was featured in the Sobey Art Award Exhibition at the National Gallery of Canada. Programming for the event included a virtual talk with Silverfox and Mary Bradshaw, Director of Visual Arts at the Yukon Arts Centre.

As a part of their 50th anniversary celebrations, the Canada Council Art Bank acquired Silverfox's work, tth'í' yáw nan (thread beads land), 2018, in 2023.

In 2024, Silverfox co-led a workshop at the Dechinta Centre for Research and Learning as a part of an event reframing issues of wildfire, climate, and art, Generative Resilience: Creative Response to Climate Crisis in the North. The workshop invited community members and climate activists to discuss wildfires and contribute to a large-scale collaborative art piece.

== Select exhibition history ==
Exhibition	Location	Date	Solo/Duo/Group
Truth and Reconciliation Through Art	AMS Art Gallery, UBC	2013	Group
Pushing Boundaries	Cityscape Community Art Space	2015	Group
Stick in the Mud	Audain Art Gallery	2017	Group
Water Honours Us	Bill Reid Gallery of Northwest Coast Art and Audain Art Gallery	2019	Group
Indigenous Femininity	Kwanlin Dün Cultural Centre	2020	Group
This is Great Material	Gallery Gachet	2020	Group
Canoe Cultures :: Ho’-ku-melh	Vancouver Maritime Museum	2020	Group
Ancestral Highways	Kwanlin Dün Cultural Centre	2021	Group
Held in Copper	Yukon Arts Centre	2022	Group
Sobey Award Art Exhibition	National Gallery of Canada	2022	Group
In the Air	Macaulay + Co.	2022	Solo
Krystle Silverfox: Hats’adän echo (Elder’s teachings)	Art Gallery of Evergreen, Evergreen Cultural Centre	2023	Solo
Invisible Forces and You are on Syilx Territory	UBCO Gallery	2023	Group
HOW BIG, HOW BLUE, HOW BEAUTIFUL, Krystle Silverfox + Michelle Sound	DIANA New York	2024	Duo
Krystle Silverfox: Raven	ODD Gallery	2024	Solo
Stories Within	Yukon Arts Centre	2024	Group
Prevailing Landscapes	Gordon Smith Gallery of Canadian Art	2024	Group
Part of the Land	Macaulay + Co.	2025	Solo
