= Yukon Ice Patches =

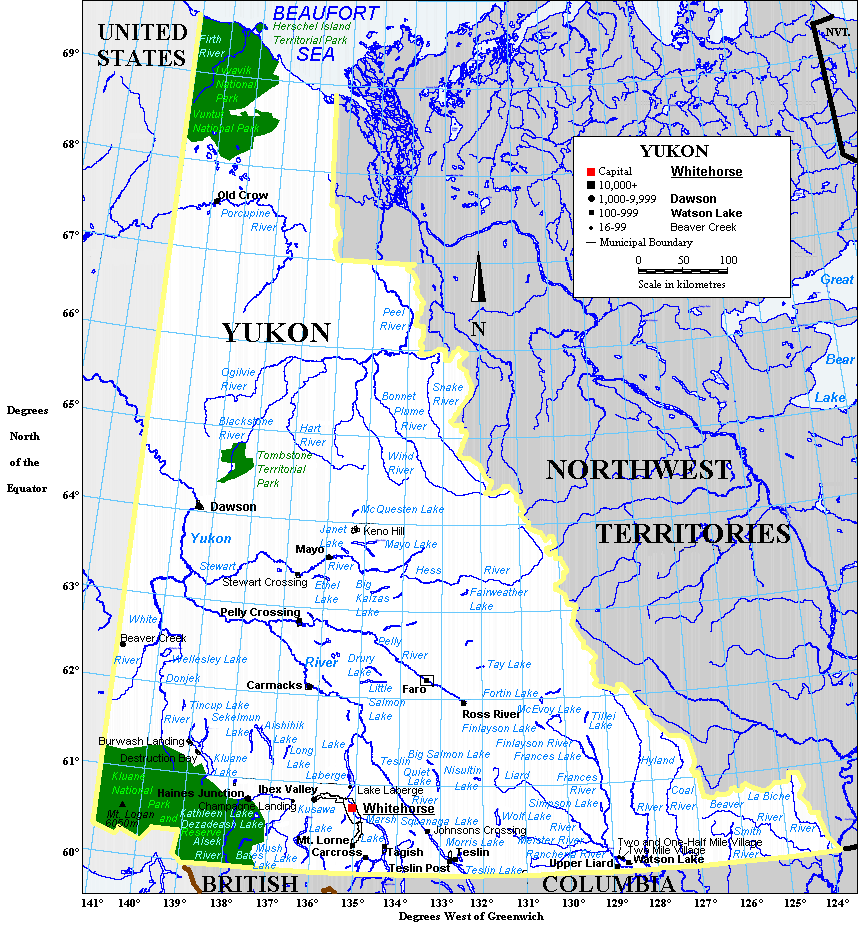
Map of Yukon

The Yukon Ice Patches are a series of dozens of ice patches in the southern Yukon discovered in 1997, which have preserved hundreds of archaeological artifacts, with some more than 9,000 years old. The first ice patch was discovered on the mountain Thandlät, west of the Kusawa Lake campground which is 60 km (37 mi) west of Whitehorse, Yukon. The Yukon Ice Patch Project began shortly afterwards with a partnership between archaeologists in partnership with six Yukon First Nations, on whose traditional territory the ice patches were found. They include the Carcross/Tagish First Nation, the Kwanlin Dün First Nation, the Ta’an Kwäch’än Council, the Champagne and Aishihik First Nations, the Kluane First Nation, and the Teslin Tlingit Council.

== Ice patches ==
Cryologists describe how ice patches, such the rare Yukon alpine region ice patches, differ from glaciers. The latter are constantly moving; they gradually build up mass over time until they reach a certain size, when they slowly flow downhill. Unlike glaciers, ice patches do not move. As some of the snow remaining from winter accumulation melts, the rest is gradually compressed into ice. Ice patches do not achieve enough mass to flow downhill so any artifacts within are preserved intact without being crushed.

== History ==
In the 1990s "during a period of extremely warm summer temperatures" with ice patches melting, the Yukon Ice Patch Project began. In September 1997, Gerald W. Kuzyk discovered the first of the Yukon ice patches artifacts, an atlatl dart fragment, on mountain Thandlät at an elevation of 1,850 m (6,070 ft).

The Yukon Ice Patches are studied by archaeologists in partnership with six Yukon First Nations, on whose traditional territory the ice patches were found. They include the Carcross/Tagish First Nation, the Kwanlin Dün First Nation, the Ta’an Kwäch’än Council, the Champagne and Aishihik First Nations, the Kluane First Nation, and the Teslin Tlingit Council.

"At [the Kusawa Lake] location, a small fragment of wooden dart shaft was recovered and radiocarbon dated to 4360 ± 50 14C yr BP (TO 6870). Also reported was a caribou dung pellet dating to 2450 ± 14C yr BP (TO 6871) collected from a nearby ice core 1.6 m (5.2 ft) below the surface (Kuzyk et al., 1999:214). That first brief research report represented one of the earliest accounts of ancient, non-glacial ice in North America and drew attention to the potential of alpine ice to be a productive source of paleobiological and archaeological information"

— Hare et al 2012

The 43 Yukon Ice Patches in southern Yukon included "more than 207 archaeological objects and 1700 faunal remains have been recovered from 43 melting ice patches in the southern Yukon. The artifacts range in age from a 9000-year-old (calendar) dart shaft to a 19th-century musket ball...Of particular interest is the description of three different techniques for the construction of throwing darts and the observation of stability in the hunting technology employed in the study area over seven millennia. Radiocarbon chronologies indicate that this period of stability was followed by an abrupt technological replacement of the throwing dart by the bow and arrow after 1200 BP." The artifacts are curated by the Yukon Archaeology Program, Government of Yukon.

In the Kusawa Lake area, there are no longer any caribou, but in her 1987 interviews, Elder Mary Ned (born 1890s-) spoke about caribou being “all over this place.” Evidence of this was proven by the nearby discovery of the Ice Patch artifacts...Oral history tells us that a corral, or caribou fence was located on the east side of the lake, between the lake and the mountain."
