= First Nation of Na-Cho Nyak Dun =

The First Nation of Na-Cho Nyäk Dun (English: "First Nation of the Big River People") is a First Nation band government in Yukon, Canada. Its main population centre is in Mayo, Yukon, but many of its members live across Canada and the United States. Members of the First Nation of Na-Cho Nyak Dun claim Gwich'in ancestry, located in north, and Dene ancestry, located in the east, along with their Northern Tutchone ancestry. The Na-cho Nyak Dun are the northernmost representatives of the Northern Tutchone language and culture.

== History ==
In 1870, the territory of the Na-Cho Nyak Dun was included in Canada's border once Rupert's land and the Northwest Territory was purchased from the Hudson's Bay Company. Although there was the Royal Proclamation of 1763, which guided the negotiation of treaties with aboriginals, no treaties were ever signed between the Na-cho Nyak Dun and the governments of Great Britain or Canada. In 1883, gold was discovered on the Stewart River and no attempts to were made to protect the rights of the Na-cho Nyak Dun. It was not until 1903 when the town of Mayo was established. In the 1920's the department of Indian Affairs provided assistance to the Na-cho Nyak Dun. The Mayo Indian band was organized in the 1950's and would later rename themselves in the 1980's to the Na-cho Nyak Dun. In 1997, the population of the Na-Cho Nyak Dun was 434 people.

== Language ==
The language originally spoken by the people of this First Nation is the Northern Tutchone language.

== Culture ==
The members of this First Nation maintain their cultural practices and continue to live off the land and continue to pursue their traditional lifestyles.

== Affiliations ==
The Na-Cho Nyak Dun are a part of the Northern Tutchone Tribal Council along with the Selkirk First Nation and the Little Salmon/Carmacks First Nation. Responsibilities of the Northern Tutchone Tribal Council include dealing with issues and matters that affect their shared vision and resources.

== Territory ==
This First Nation has a very large historical territory, that includes many rivers, lakes, and mountain ranges.

The First Nation of Na-Cho Nyäk Dun was one of the first four First Nations to sign a Yukon land claims agreement in 1995.

As of the 2006 Census of the First Nation of Na-Cho Nyak Dun, through the Umbrella Final Agreement, First Nation of Na-Cho Nyak Dun owns 2,408.69 km^{2} of Category A land, 2330.99 km^{2} of Category B land, and 9.27 km^{2} of land allocated per section 4.34 of their Final Agreement. The traditional territory is situated in north-east Yukon center on village of Mayo.

== Politics ==
The First Nation of Na-Cho Nyak Dun has been active in the land claims movement starting in 1973. In 1984 members aided the Council of Yukon First nation in breakdown of negotiations and rejection of agreements. The critical issues of the time were self-government and retention of aboriginal rights which were eventually included in agreements made in 1993. The Final and Self-Government Agreements with Yukon and Canada were signed on May 29, 1993, and went into effect on February 14, 1995.

=== Government ===
The Na-Cho Nyak Dun government comprises the Assembly, the Council, the Chief, the Deputy Chief, the Elders Council, the External Relations Council, the Youth Council, and a Tribal Justice System.

=== Na-cho Nyak Dun Final Agreement (1993) ===
The final agreement was signed on May 29, 1993, and follows the Umbrella Final Agreement and affirms the rights and benefits of the Na-cho Nyak Dun within their own territory. It allocated approximately 1,830 square miles to the Na-Cho Nyak Dun and set parameters for resource use, management of heritage resources, and protection of burial sites. The town of Mayo became the administrative center and the Yukon and Canadian governments must consult the First Nation before they act within Na-cho Nyak Dun boundaries. Financial compensation of $14,554,654 was provided by Canada over a span of fifteen years.

=== First Nation of Nacho Nyak Dun Self-Government Agreement (1993) ===
The agreement was signed on May 29, 1993 and turned the Na-cho Nyak Dun from a band under the administration of the Indian Act to a self-governing First Nation.

=== First Nation of Na-cho Nyak Dun v. Yukon (2017) ===
The supreme court of Canada appealed the approval of a land use plan for the Peel Watershed in the Yukon on December 1, 2017. Na-cho Nyak Dun was successful in overturning Yukon's land use plan as the Supreme Court of Canada found that Yukon breached the process set in the Umbrella Final Agreement and the court ruled that Yukon can only depart from positions it has taken in the past in good faith.

== Economy ==
Most also hold employment positions where ever they reside.

=== Mining ===
The First Nation of Na-Cho Nyak Dun has a long tradition of mining with the Keno Hill mines starting from the 1910s.

A silver mining company, Alexco, entered bilateral agreements with the First Nation of Na-Cho Nyak Dun. Operations on the traditional territory evolved from exploration, development, to production. The Comprehensive Cooperation and Benefits Agreement guides Alexco's interaction with Na-Cho Nyak Dun. It acknowledges the aboriginal rights and title along with the legitimacy of mining leases and other property rights at Keno Hill.

== Environment ==
On August 22, 2019, Tr'ondlk Hwlch'in, the Gwich'in Tribal Council, the Na-Cho Nyak Dun First Nation, the Vuntut Gwitch'in Government, and Government of the Yukon signed the Peel Watershed Regional Land Use Plan. The plan was made to protect more than 67,000 square kilometers of wilderness in the watershed region. This region was used by the ancestors of the four First Nations. The plan designates 83 percent of the region as a conservation area with the remaining 17 percent having various levels of development. Originally in 2014, the Yukon territorial government wanted to mine in 70 percent of the Peel Watershed. However this plan was rejected by the Supreme Court of Canada in First Nation of Na-Cho Nyak Dun v. Yukon in 2017. The eight goals of the Peel Watershed Regional Land Use Plan consists of, maintaining the wilderness character, maintaining ecological integrity, maintaining the quantity, quality, and rate of flow of water, ensuring human disturbed lands are restored to natural state, preserving heritage and cultural resources, facilitating economic opportunities, minimizing land use conflicts, and maintaining future land use options.
