= Gertrude Saxinger =

Austrian researcher

Gertrude Saxinger is a professor of Applied Integrative Geography at the University of Graz, Austria. She works on social dimensions of natural resource extraction (mining, oil and gas) as well as on interdisciplinary, transdisciplinary and decolonial methodology in Arctic research.

"ORCID". orcid.org.

See also Working Group INTEGRATIVES https://geographie.uni-graz.at/en/our-research/integratives/

Austrian Polar Research Institute APRI.

== Contributions ==
Saxinger previously worked in textile engineering in South-East Asia and stage costume design/production for theatres in Austria in the 1990s. She has a PhD in Social Anthropology from the University of Vienna (2013) and defended her habilitation at the University of Bern, Switzerland. She studies community-extractive industry relations in remote regions (Canada, Russia, Sápmi) and associated issues of mono-industrial urban and regional development in the Circumpolar North. She also works on the ‘green’ transition and critical mineral extraction and the European Green Deal.

Together with her international colleagues from geology, anthropology, geography, political science, sociology and cultural studies, she leads the SSHRC funded research and conversation project Beyond Hot Air - Conversations around Critical raw materials supply for the 'green' transition.

Substantive projects have been with the First Nation of Na-cho Nyäk Dun in Yukon/Canada on the impacts of 20th century colonialism and gold and silver mining, on mobility infrastructures and state-corporate-community relationships in oil regions along the Baikal-Amur Mainline (BAM) in Siberia and on hyper-mobile workforce (FIFO / fly-in/fly-out, rail-in/rail-out) of the oil and gas industries of in the Yamal-Nenets and Khanty-Mansi Autonomous Districts in Russia.

== Works ==
- Krasnoshtanova, N., Illmeier, G, Saxinger, G. 2021. Токма – маленькое село вдали оТ больших дорог. Tokma - small village off the big roads. https://phaidra.univie.ac.at/o:1249268
- Elders of the First Nation of Nacho Nyäk Dun, Gartler, S., Hogan, J., Saxinger. 2019. Dän Hùnày. Our Peoples' Story. First Nation of Nacho Nyäk Dun Elders' Memories and Opinions on Mining. https://phaidra.univie.ac.at/o:1249041
- Film. Saxinger, G. with R. Gebauer, S. Gartler, J. Oschmann. 2017. Mining on First Nation Land ‐ The First Nation of Na‐Cho Nyäk Dun in Mayo/Yukon Territory Film.
- Saxinger, G. & S. Gartier. 2017. The Mobile Workers Guide - Fly-In/Fly-Out & Rotational Shift Work in Mining. Yukon Experiences Mobile_Workers_Guide_2017.pdf. Yukon Experiences. ReSDA/ First Nation of Na-cho Nyäk Dun/Yukon College.
- Saxinger, G. 2016. Unterwegs. Mobiles Leben in der Erdgas‐ und Erdölindustrie in Russlands Arktis /Mobil’nyy obraz zhizni vakhtovykh rabochikh neftegazovoy promyshlennosti na Russkom Kraynem Severe /Lives on the Move – Long‐distance Commuting in the Northern Russian Petroleum Industry. With an extended summary in English and Russian. Böhlau, pp. 206. ISBN 978-3-205-79694-7
- Taylor, A. Carson, D., Ensign, P., Huskey, L., Rasmussen, R. & G. Saxinger. (eds.). 2016. Settlements at the Edge: Remote human settlements in developed nations. Edward Elgar Publishing. ISBN 9781784711955
- Schweitzer, P., Donecker, St. & Saxinger, G. (eds.) 2016. Arktis und Subarktis. Geschichte, Kultur, Gesellschaft (Arctic and Subarctic. History, Culture, Society). New Academic Press, 224 pp. ISBN 978-3-7003-2321-1
