= White River First Nation =

First Nation in Yukon Territory

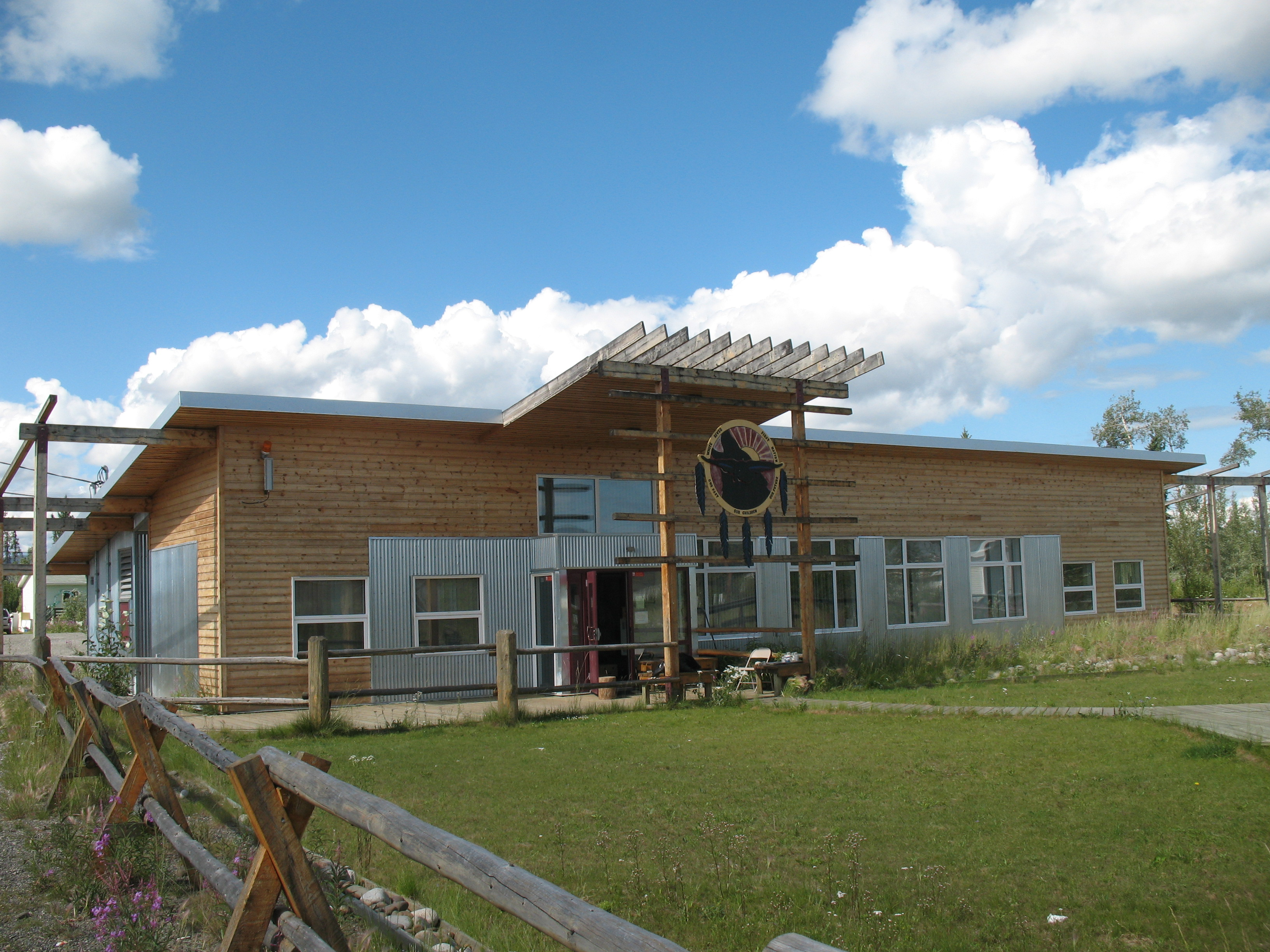

The White River First Nation (WRFN) is a First Nation of Upper Tanana, Northern Tutchone, and Southern Tutchone peoples in the western Yukon Territory in Canada. Its main population centre is Beaver Creek, Yukon.

== Language ==
The White River people historically spoke Upper Tanana, an Athabaskan language.

== History ==
The Upper Tanana territory once extended from the Donjek River into neighbouring Alaska. The Northern Tutchone territory included the lower Stewart River and the area south of the Yukon River on the White and Donjek River drainages.

Closely related through marriages between various local bands, these two language groups were merged by the Canadian government into a single White River Indian Band in the early 1950s for administrative convenience. In 1961, the Canadian government combined the White River Band with the Southern Tutchone-speaking members of the Burwash Band at Burwash on Kluane Lake as the Kluane Band (subsequently the Kluane Tribal Brotherhood and then the Kluane Tribal Council). In 1990, the Kluane Tribal Council split its membership into the Kluane First Nation, centered in Burwash, and the White River First Nation, centered in Beaver Creek.

== Land claims ==
The White River First Nation participated in negotiations for a land claims agreement and had reached a memorandum of understanding on most issues, but the parties were not able to reach a final agreement to put forward to ratification by WRFN citizens. The Federal Government mandate to negotiate land claims in the Yukon expired on March 31, 2005 and on April 1 the Federal Government announced that discussions with the WRFN "will no longer involve the possibility of concluding land claim and self-government agreements" and will instead focus "on how best to advance the interest of White River under the provisions of the Indian Act."
