= Kusawa Lake =

Lake in Yukon, Canada

- Location within Yukon
- Location: Yukon (Canada)
- Coordinates: 60°21′22.7″N 136°20′25.9″W
- Primary inflows: Takhini River, Primrose River, Kusawa River
- Primary outflows: Takhini River
- Basin countries: Canada
- Max. length: 75 km (47 mi)
- Max. width: 2.5 km (1.6 mi)
- Max. depth: 140 m (460 ft)
- Surface elevation: 671 m (2,201 ft)
- Settlements: Whitehorse, Yukon

Kusawa Lake is a lake in the southern Yukon, Canada. Kusawa means "long narrow lake" in the Tlingit language. The Kusawa Lake is a lake in Canada's Yukon Territory. It is located at an altitude of 671 m (2,201 ft) and is 60 km (37 mi) southwest of Whitehorse near the British Columbia border. It meanders over a length of 75 km (47 mi) with a maximum width of about 2.5 km (1.6 mi) through the mountains in the north of the Boundary Ranges. It is fed by the Primrose River and Kusawa River. The Takhini outflows to the Yukon River from the northern tip of Kusawa Lake. Kusawa Lake has an area of 142 km^{2} (55 sq mi). The lake has a maximum depth of 140 m (460 ft) and is of glacial origin. It is a common tourist destination and is also popular for fishing.

== Description ==
Kusawa Lake is one of many large, long and narrow glacier-fed alpine lakes in the southern Yukon, most of which are part of the Yukon River system. Others include Teslin Lake, Atlin Lake, Tagish Lake, Marsh Lake, Lake Laberge, and Kluane Lake.

There is access to the lake via an unpaved road that branches from the Yukon Highway 1 Alaska Highway, which runs 20 km (12 mi) north of the lake.

== Etymology ==
Kusawa was derived from a Tlingit phrase, which means narrow lake. Because retreating glaciers often leave long and narrow lakes, there were at least four lakes which were once called Kusawa, including the present-day Kusawa Lake.

== Archaeology ==
About 6 km (3.7 mi) east of the campgrounds on Kuwasa Lake is the site where the first of the Yukon Ice Patches was discovered in 1997 on mountain Thandlät. The Yukon Ice Patches are studied by archaeologists in partnership with six Yukon First Nations, on whose traditional territory the ice patches were found. They include the Carcross/Tagish First Nation, the Kwanlin Dün First Nation, the Ta’an Kwäch’än Council, the Champagne and Aishihik First Nations, the Kluane First Nation, and the Teslin Tlingit Council. The wooden dart shaft fragment that was recovered was radiocarbon dated to 4360 ± 50 14C yr BP (TO 6870).

== Kusawa Lake Territorial Park ==
The Kusawa Lake Territorial Park, a protected area of 3,082 km^{2} (1,190 sq mi), is in the planning stage.

== Wildlife ==
=== Fish ===
The lake is dominated by Arctic grayling, herring, round whitefish, and American char.

=== Caribou ===
There are no longer any caribou in the region but in her 1987 interviews, Elder Mary Ned (born 1890s-) also spoke about caribou being "all over this place." Evidence of this was proven by the nearby discovery of the Ice Patch artifacts...Oral history tells us that a corral, or caribou fence was located on the east side of the lake, between the lake and the mountain."

== See also ==
- List of lakes in Yukon
