= Thandlät =

Highest point
- Coordinates: 60°21′09″N 136°09′16″W

Naming
- Native name: Thandlät (Southern Tutchone)

Thandlät is a mountain to the west of Kusawa Lake in the Yukon. The first of the Yukon Ice Patches archaeological study artifacts to be discovered in 1997, was an atlatl dart fragment, which was located at an elevation of 1850 m on the mountain.

== Etymology ==
The mountain was named Thandlät in the Southern Tutchone language.

== Archaeology ==
The mountain of Thandlät is cited in literature about the traditional homelands of the Tlingit and the Southern Tutchone. The first of the Yukon Ice Patches archaeological study artifacts to be discovered in 1997, was an atlatl dart fragment, which was located at an elevation of 1850 m on the mountain.
