= Cory Bellmore =

Canadian politician

The Honourable Cory Bellmore MLA
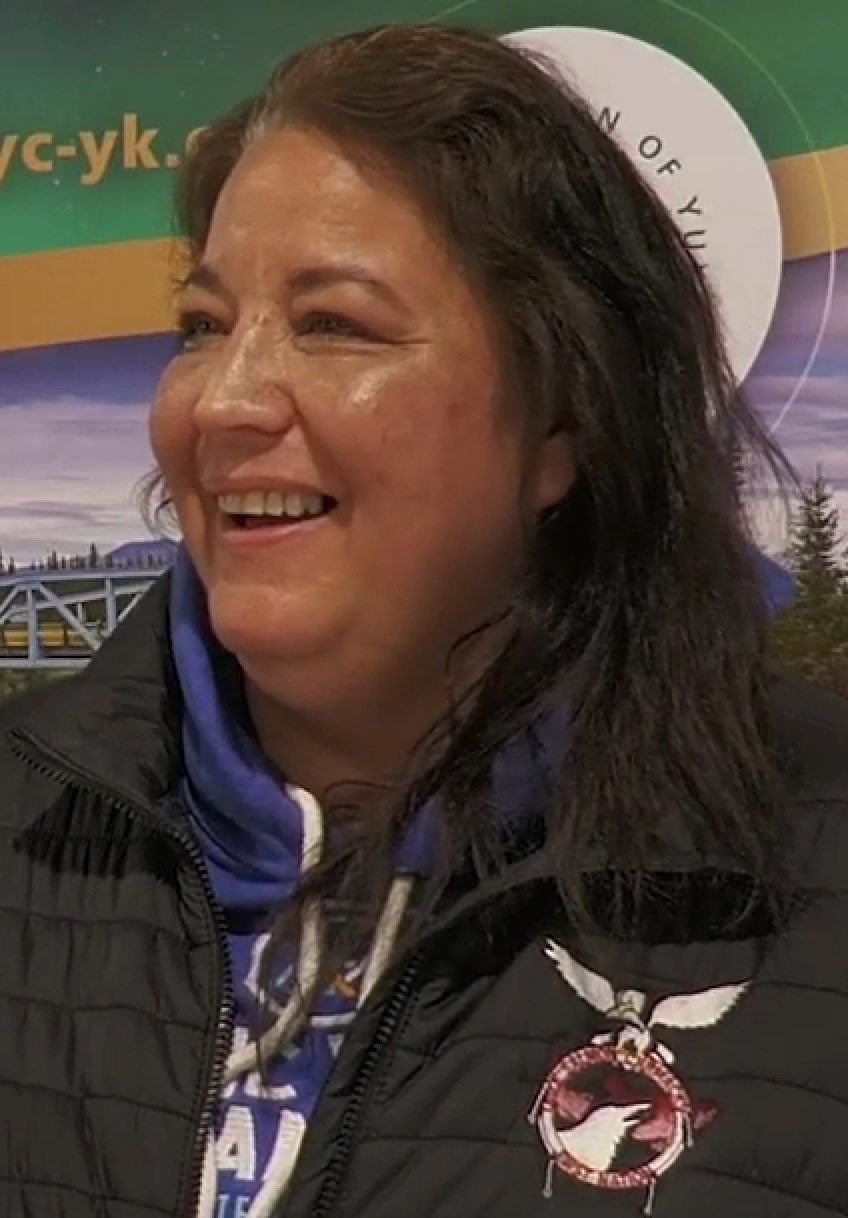

Minister of Community Services and Minister responsible for the Yukon Lottery Commission
- Incumbent
- Assumed office November 22, 2025
- Premier: Currie Dixon
- Preceded by: Richard Mostyn (Community Services); Sandy Silver (Yukon Lottery Commission)

Member of the Yukon Legislative Assembly for Mayo-Tatchun
- Incumbent
- Assumed office November 3, 2025
- Preceded by: Jeremy Harper

Personal details
- Party: Yukon Party

Cory Bellmore is a Canadian politician, who was elected to the Yukon Legislative Assembly in the 2025 Yukon general election. She represents the electoral district of Mayo-Tatchun as a member of the Yukon Party.

Bellmore is a member of the Little Salmon/Carmacks First Nation, where she is its director of finance and administration. She is also a Carmacks village councillor as well as a former member of the Tantalus School Council.

As Minister of Community Services, Bellmore was responsible for amendments to the Residential Tenancies Act that eliminates rent control and re-legalizes no-cause evictions in Yukon, undoing changes the previous Liberal minority government had enacted under Sandy Silver in 2021 with support from the Yukon New Democratic Party in order to keep the Liberals in power.

== Electoral record ==
2025 Yukon general election: Mayo-Tatchun
Party	Candidate	Votes	%	±%
Yukon Party	Cory Bellmore	315	45.99	+16.56
Liberal	Jeremy Harper	288	42.04	+4.39
New Democratic	Colin Prentice	82	11.97	–20.94
Total valid votes		685		
Total rejected ballots				
Turnout			61.11	
Eligible voters		1,121		
Yukon Party gain from Liberal		Swing		+6.08
Source(s) "2025 General Election Official Results". Elections Yukon.
