= Jerry Alfred =

Northern Tutchone musician (born 1955)

Jerry Alfred (born 1955 in Mayo, Yukon) is a Northern Tutchone musician living in Pelly Crossing, Yukon. He received a 1996 Juno Award for his recording ETSI Shon (Grandfather Song) in the category Aboriginal Recording of the Year. His music was featured as part of a Native American photo exhibit at the 1996 Summer Olympics in Atlanta.

== Early life ==
Alfred was born in the community of Mayo, Yukon in September 1955 into traditional life and speaking the Northern Tutchone language, a skill which he kept alive in spite of having been sent to residential English speaking schools at the age of five. Alfred was born into the Crow Clan and inherited the title of "Keeper of the Songs" from his father. This position gave him the responsibility of collecting traditional songs and performing at ceremonial events of his people, the Selkirk First Nation. Alfred's position also involved his representing the clan at potlatches, or meetings with the broader Yukon Aboriginal community.

He was named "Keeper of the Songs" at birth, an honorary title which he has made into a career, updating traditional Tutchone music by adding twentieth century Western influences. Alfred's musical training began when he was placed in a choir while at the residential schools. His parents bought him his first guitar when he was seven, and he began learning in earnest in his teens, probably due to the influence of Bob Dylan, an influence which still lives in Alfred's music today. In the 1980s and early 1990s, Alfred played a large role in negotiations with the Government of Canada over the Selkirk people's Land Claim, which culminated in an agreement in 1995. In 1996, he received a Juno Award as Jerry Alfred & The Medicine Beat for Best Music for Aboriginal Canada Recording.

In 1994, Alfred's father made a special effort to engage Alfred in his people's songs again, and when his father died, Alfred was inspired to release a record, 1994's "Etsi Shon", or "Grandfather Song", which served the dual purpose of keeping alive the music and the language of the Selkirk people. Alfred has since released two other albums, "Nendaa" (Go Back) in 1996, and Kehlonn in 1998, with his band, Medicine Beat.

Alfred hopes to pass the position of Song Keeper to his eldest daughter.

== Discography ==
- Jerry Alfred and the Medicine Beat (1994) Etsi Shon: Grandfather Song (Whitehorse, Independent production by Jerry Alfred)
- Jerry Alfred and the Medicine Beat (1996) Nendaä: Go Back (Whitehorse, Etsi Shon Productions) Caribou Records 7 7863 105962 8
- Jerry Alfred and the Medicine Beat (1998) Kehlonn (Whitehorse, Jerry Alfred) Caribou Records 7 78631 98302 0

== See also ==
- Music of Canada
- Aboriginal music of Canada
- First Nations music
- Jim Robb (painter)
- List of Canadian musicians
