= Youth For Lateral Kindness =

Canadian non-profit

Youth for Lateral Kindness is a community organization based in Canada, founded by Teagyn Vallevand and Aurora Hardy, that is working to address problems of lateral violence within indigenous communities, and informing the general public about native history that is often neglected in school curriculum. Lateral violence has been defined as displaced anger, aggression, and hatred toward ones community and self, rather than those who are causing harm. The organization's purpose is to minimize lateral violence caused by colonization and structural oppression.

== Origins ==
Teagyn Vallevand and Auroa Hardy, members of the Kwanlin Dun First Nation of Canada, founded Youth for Lateral Kindness in 2016 from an understanding that “Lateral violence is the byproduct of colonization, oppression, intergenerational trauma and the continued experiences of racial discrimination." Vallevand and Hardy were previously part of a group effort called Violence to Kindness(v2k) Project, initiated by the elders of their community. The elders noticed peer-to-peer violence, which they perceived to happen "when someone has been made to feel powerless through colonization and trauma, and the easiest way to take power is from those closest to [them]." This can also be understood as internalized racism and may manifest as hate within oneself and others and other within one's community. The elders' goal was to alleviate the pain within their community by directing their efforts toward the youth. V2K ended in the summer of 2016 and Vallevand and Hardy saw a continued need for this work, which resulted in their founding of Youth for Lateral Kindness. This organization provides workshops and outreach to educate people about lateral violence and history.

== Services ==
The services offered by Youth for Lateral Kindness include "The Blanket Exercise" and 'Lateral Violence Workshops."

=== The Blanket Exercise ===
As described by Vallevand and Hardy, The Blanket Exercise offers perspective "of the first peoples [lives] through pre-contact, treaty-making, colonization, and resistance." According to their website, "In this two hour participatory workshop, blankets are laid out on the ground to represent the land; as the exercise progresses, participants gain a visual representation of our history.” Open to both native and non-native people, The Blanket Exercise broadens awareness about the history of Indigenous people and Canada. Once the exercise is completed there is a gathering of all the participants to process and investigate feelings that arose throughout the experience.

=== Workshops ===
The workshops encompass many different group activities and learning opportunities that are centered on and run by indigenous youth. The purpose of the workshops is to "really get into the core of why lateral violence exists." The workshops are flexible in duration ranging from 2 hours to full days, and cater to twelve to thirty year olds. Teagyn Vallevand and Aurora Hardy also offer thirty minute presentations that provide a glimpse into their journeys as youth facilitators within their communities. These slideshow presentations offer an overview of the work they have done with both V2K and Youth for Lateral Kindness.
