= Jeremy Harper =

Canadian politician

The Honourable Jeremy Harper

Speaker of the Yukon Legislative Assembly
- In office May 11, 2021 – November 3, 2025
- Preceded by: Nils Clarke
- Succeeded by: Yvonne Clarke

Member of the Yukon Legislative Assembly for Mayo-Tatchun
- In office April 12, 2021 – November 3, 2025
- Preceded by: Don Hutton
- Succeeded by: Cory Bellmore

Personal details
- Party: Yukon Liberal Party

Jeremy Harper is a Canadian politician, who was elected to the Yukon Legislative Assembly in the 2021 Yukon general election. He represented the electoral district of Mayo-Tatchun as a member of the Yukon Liberal Party.

A member of the Selkirk First Nation, he has served as a band councillor and recreation coordinator for the community and is a member of the Canadian Rangers.

He was the only sitting Liberal MLA to seek re-election in the 2025 Yukon general election, losing to Cory Bellmore of the Yukon Party.

== Electoral record ==
2025 Yukon general election: Mayo-Tatchun
Party	Candidate	Votes	%	±%
Yukon Party	Cory Bellmore	315	45.99	+16.56
Liberal	Jeremy Harper	288	42.04	+4.39
New Democratic	Colin Prentice	82	11.97	–20.94
Total valid votes		685		
Total rejected ballots				
Turnout			61.11	
Eligible voters		1,121		
Yukon Party gain from Liberal		Swing		+6.08
Source(s) "2025 General Election Official Results". Elections Yukon.

2021 Yukon general election: Mayo-Tatchun
Party	Candidate	Votes	%	±%
Liberal	Jeremy Harper	238	37.65	-7.6%
New Democratic	Patty Wallingham	208	32.91	+1.0%
Yukon Party	Peter Grundmanis	186	29.43	+6.7%
Total valid votes		632		
Total rejected ballots				
Turnout				
Eligible voters				
Liberal hold		Swing		-4.11
Source(s) "Unofficial Election Results 2021". Elections Yukon.
