= Roddy Blackjack =

Roddy Blackjack (c. 1927 – death announced on May 2, 2013) was a Canadian elder and former Chief of the Little Salmon/Carmacks First Nation of the Yukon Territory. He also served as an executive elder of the Council of Yukon First Nations and "elder in residence" at Yukon College.

Blackjack is considered an early architect of the Yukon Land Claims agreement. In 1973, Blackjack traveled to Ottawa as part of a delegation of Yukon First Nation leaders. He presented Canadian Prime Minister Pierre Trudeau with documents and other paperwork which would form the basis for the eventual Yukon Land Claims agreement.

Blackjack died in early May 2013 at the age of 86. His death was announced on May 2, 2013.
