= Tutchone language =

Athabaskan language spoken in the Yukon

Tutchone
- Native to: Canada
- Region: Yukon
- Ethnicity: 2,500 (1,100 Northern Tutchone, 1,400 Southern Tutchone; 2007)
- Native speakers: 360 (2016 census)
- Language family: Na-Dené: Athabaskan–Eyak; Athabaskan; Northern Athabaskan; Tutchone

Language codes
- ISO 639-3: Either: tce – Southern ttm – Northern
- Glottolog: tutc1236
- Speaker location

Dän / Dün "person"
- People: Northern: Dän; Southern: Dän / Dün
- Language: Northern: Dän Kʼí; Southern: Dän Kʼè
- Country: Denendeh; Northern: Dän Kezhi; Southern: Dákéyi / Dän Keyi

Tutchone is an Athabaskan language spoken by the Northern and Southern Tutchone First Nations in central and southern regions of Yukon Territory, Canada. Tutchone belongs to the Northern Athabaskan linguistic subfamily and has two primary varieties, Southern and Northern. Although they are sometimes considered separate languages, Northern and Southern Tutchone speakers are generally able to understand each other in conversation, albeit with moderate difficulty.

== Dialects ==
Southern (Dän kʼè)

- Aishihik dialect
- Tàaʼan dialect
- Klukshu dialect
- Kluane dialect

Northern (Dän kʼí)

- Big Salmon dialect
- Pelly Crossing dialect
- Mayo dialect
- White River dialect

== Vocabulary comparison ==
The comparison of some words in the two languages:

Northern	Southern	meaning
łu ¹ ~ łyok ²	łu	fish
łígī	łä̀chʼi	one
łä́ki	łä̀ki	two
tadechʼi	tayke	three
łénínchʼi	dùkʼwän	four
hulákʼo	kä̀jän	five
èkúm	ä́kų̀	my house
ninkúm	nkų̀	your (sg.) house
ukúm	ukų̀	his/her house
dàkúm	dákų̀	our house
dàkúm	dákų̀	your (pl.) house
huukúm	kwäkų̀/kukų̀	their house

¹ Big Salmon dialect
² Pelly Crossing dialect
