= Beaver Creek, Yukon =

Beaver Creek
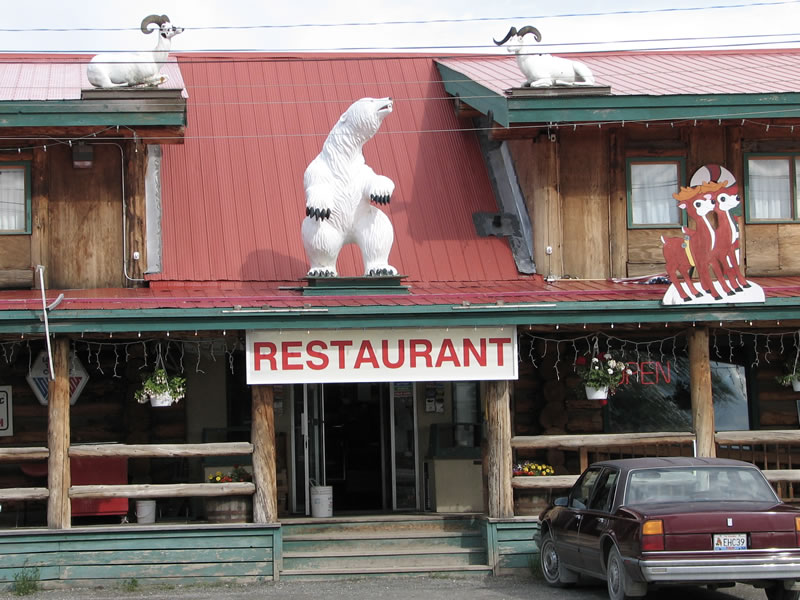
- Restaurant in Beaver Creek, Yukon

- Location within Canada
- Coordinates: 62°22′58″N 140°52′47″W
- Country: Canada
- Territory: Yukon

Area
  - Land: 27.14 km^{2} (10.48 sq mi)
- Elevation: 650 m (2,130 ft)

Population (2021)
  - Total: 78
  - Density: 2.9/km^{2} (7.5/sq mi)
- Time zone: UTC−07:00 (MST)
- Canadian Postal code: Y0B 1A0
- Area code: 867

Beaver Creek is a community in Yukon, Canada. Located at kilometre 1870.6 (historical mile 1202) of the Alaska Highway, 1 NM (1.9 km; 1.2 mi) southeast of Beaver Creek Airport and close to the Alcan - Beaver Creek Border Crossing, it is Canada's westernmost community. The community's main employers are a Canada Border Services Agency port, Royal Canadian Mounted Police Detachment, the White River First Nation and a number of tourist lodges.

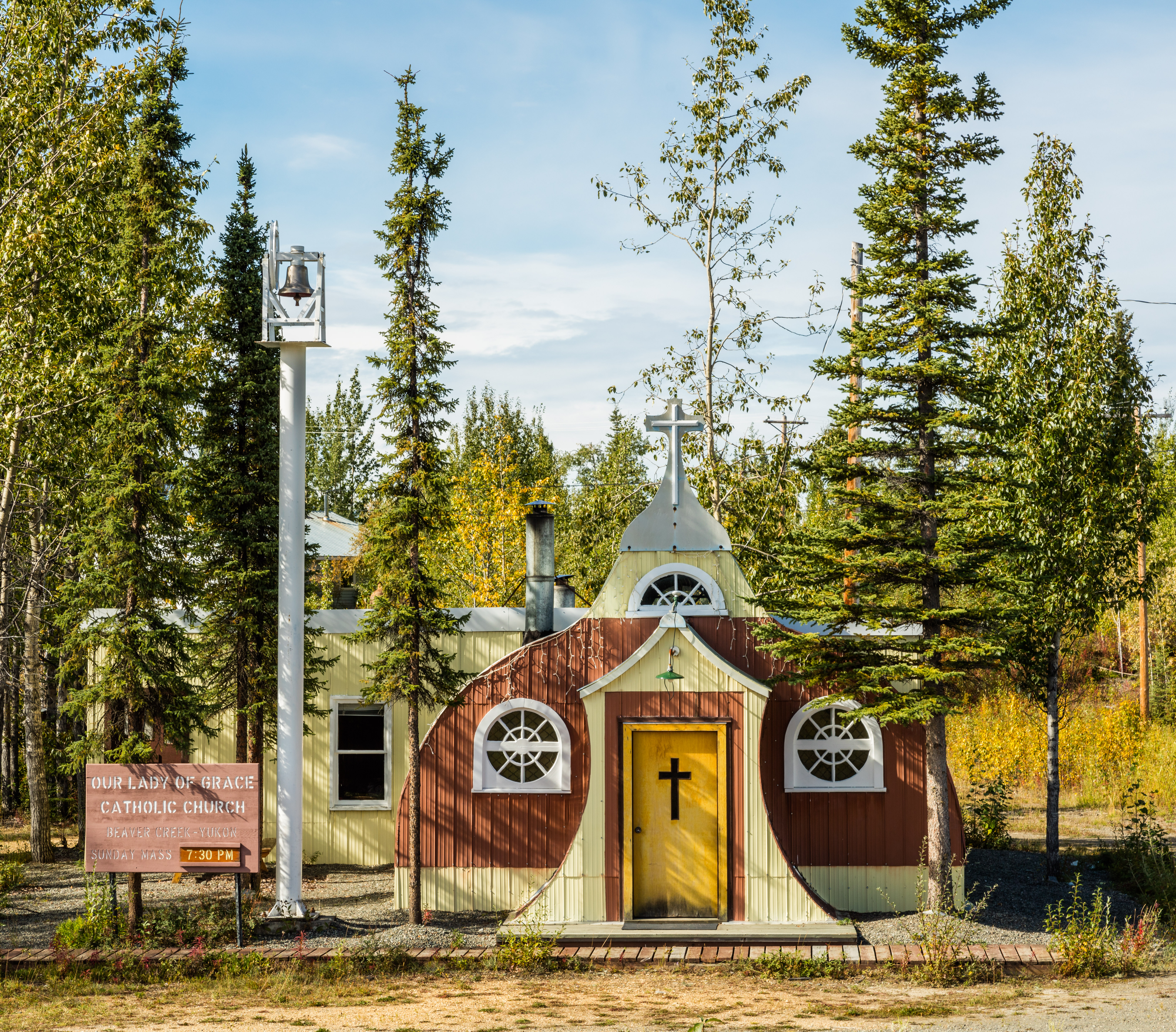
A wooden Catholic church in Beaver Creek

It is the home of the White River First Nation. The First Nation is made up of Upper Tanana speaking people whose traditional territory extends from the Donjek River into neighbouring Alaska, and Athapaskan Northern Tutchone speaking people whose traditional territories included the lower Stewart River and the area south of the Yukon River on the White and Donjek River drainages. In addition to the Alaska Highway, the community is served by the Beaver Creek Airport.

Since April 2025, Beaver Creek has been home to the Saa/Se solar farm, with 3520 solar panels and a solar battery system. The facility, whose name consists of the words for "sun" in the Upper Tanana and Tutchone languages respectively, had been under construction since 2023. The farm, rated at 1.9 megawatts, is intended to meet 55% of the community's electricity needs, which was previously met by diesel generators.

The CBSA station is the furthest from the border crossing of any Canadian customs station at a distance of 28.6 km (17.8 mi), and at least up to the 1990s, some individuals lived in the "no man's land" in between the border and customs. Prior to 1983, the customs station was located in the middle of the community, with the resulting confusion: individuals driving past without stopping, and locals with a new vehicle not being recognized as they drove by.

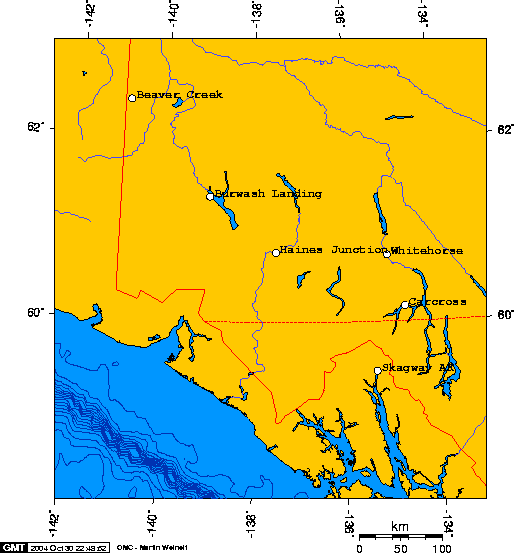
Kluane Park and Alaska Highway area

== Climate ==
Like most of Yukon, Beaver Creek has a subarctic climate (Dfc), and NRC Plant Hardiness Zone of 0a. It is situated at an elevation of approximately 650 m (2,130 ft). Beaver Creek experiences annual temperature average daily highs of 20 °C (68 °F) in July and average daily lows of −30 °C (−22 °F) in January. Record high temperature was 32.8 °C (91.0 °F) on June 15, 1969, and the lowest was −55.0 °C (−67.0 °F) on January 17, 1971. Beaver Creek has an average annual snowfall of 117.9 cm (46.42 in) and 298.6 mm (11.76 in) of rainfall.

The airstrip at Snag, 25 km (16 mi) east of Beaver Creek, experienced the lowest ever temperature measured in North America (excluding Greenland), −63.0 °C (−81.4 °F) on February 3, 1947.

Climate data for Beaver Creek (Beaver Creek Airport) Climate ID: 2100160; coordinates 62°24′37″N 140°52′03″W; elevation: 649 m (2,129 ft); 1981–2010, extremes 1968–present
Month	Jan	Feb	Mar	Apr	May	Jun	Jul	Aug	Sep	Oct	Nov	Dec	Year
Record high humidex	2.8	7.1	8.3	19.4	25.5	36.8	36.2	33.0	25.3	18.3	7.2	12.4	36.8
Record high °C (°F)	4.0 (39.2)	7.0 (44.6)	10.0 (50.0)	22.0 (71.6)	29.0 (84.2)	32.8 (91.0)	31.5 (88.7)	31.1 (88.0)	26.5 (79.7)	20.5 (68.9)	7.8 (46.0)	14.0 (57.2)	32.8 (91.0)
Mean daily maximum °C (°F)	−20.4 (−4.7)	−13.1 (8.4)	−3.5 (25.7)	6.2 (43.2)	13.4 (56.1)	19.1 (66.4)	20.3 (68.5)	17.9 (64.2)	10.9 (51.6)	−0.9 (30.4)	−14.2 (6.4)	−19.0 (−2.2)	1.4 (34.5)
Daily mean °C (°F)	−25.2 (−13.4)	−19.9 (−3.8)	−12.3 (9.9)	−1.3 (29.7)	6.6 (43.9)	12.4 (54.3)	14.1 (57.4)	11.3 (52.3)	4.6 (40.3)	−6.2 (20.8)	−19.0 (−2.2)	−23.6 (−10.5)	−4.9 (23.2)
Mean daily minimum °C (°F)	−30.0 (−22.0)	−26.7 (−16.1)	−21.1 (−6.0)	−8.7 (16.3)	−0.2 (31.6)	5.6 (42.1)	7.8 (46.0)	4.7 (40.5)	−1.7 (28.9)	−11.5 (11.3)	−23.9 (−11.0)	−28.3 (−18.9)	−11.2 (11.8)
Record low °C (°F)	−55.0 (−67.0)	−52.0 (−61.6)	−48.0 (−54.4)	−35.0 (−31.0)	−13.5 (7.7)	−7.0 (19.4)	−2.0 (28.4)	−6.7 (19.9)	−26.0 (−14.8)	−37.2 (−35.0)	−46.5 (−51.7)	−52.8 (−63.0)	−55.0 (−67.0)
Record low wind chill	−60.4	−56.4	−54.6	−34.6	−13.3	−4.8	−2.3	−5.3	−20.2	−39.8	−47.6	−59.7	−60.4
Average precipitation mm (inches)	13.9 (0.55)	13.9 (0.55)	12.9 (0.51)	8.8 (0.35)	39.7 (1.56)	72.0 (2.83)	101.3 (3.99)	57.1 (2.25)	36.9 (1.45)	28.1 (1.11)	19.2 (0.76)	13.5 (0.53)	417.3 (16.43)
Average rainfall mm (inches)	0.0 (0.0)	0.0 (0.0)	0.0 (0.0)	1.4 (0.06)	35.6 (1.40)	72.0 (2.83)	101.3 (3.99)	56.7 (2.23)	27.8 (1.09)	4.0 (0.16)	0.0 (0.0)	0.0 (0.0)	298.6 (11.76)
Average snowfall cm (inches)	13.9 (5.5)	13.9 (5.5)	12.9 (5.1)	7.5 (3.0)	4.1 (1.6)	0.0 (0.0)	0.0 (0.0)	0.4 (0.2)	9.1 (3.6)	24.1 (9.5)	19.2 (7.6)	12.8 (5.0)	117.9 (46.4)
Average precipitation days (≥ 0.2 mm)	6.2	5.1	4.9	3.0	9.6	13.7	17.5	13.2	9.7	9.7	8.1	5.7	106.4
Average rainy days (≥ 0.2 mm)	0.0	0.0	0.0	0.5	8.1	13.7	17.5	13.2	8.0	1.4	0.0	0.0	62.4
Average snowy days (≥ 0.2 cm)	6.2	5.1	4.9	2.5	1.2	0.0	0.0	0.1	1.9	8.2	8.1	5.7	43.9
Source: Environment and Climate Change Canada Canadian Climate Normals 1981–2010

== Demographics ==
Federal census population history of Beaver Creek
Year	Pop.	±%
1981	90	—
1986	113	+25.6%
1991	104	−8.0%
1996	131	+26.0%
2001	88	−32.8%
2006	112	+27.3%
2011	103	−8.0%
2016	93	−9.7%
2021	78	−16.1%
Source: Statistics Canada

In the 2021 Census of Population conducted by Statistics Canada, Beaver Creek had a population of 78 living in 40 of its 61 total private dwellings, a change of −16.1% from its 2016 population of 93. With a land area of 26.66 km^{2} (10.29 sq mi), it had a population density of 2.9/km^{2} (7.6/sq mi) in 2021.
