= Pelly Crossing =

Selkirk town in Yukon, Canada

Coordinates: 62°50′N 136°35′W

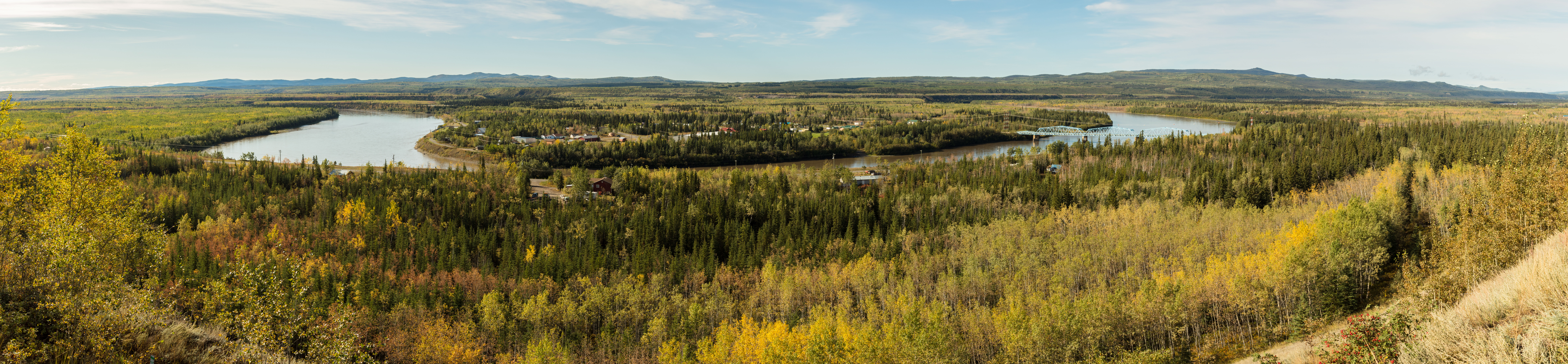
Pelly Crossing and Pelly River (August 2017).

Pelly Crossing is a community in Yukon, Canada. It lies where the Klondike Highway crosses the Pelly River.

It is the home of the Selkirk First Nation, and home to the Northern Tutchone culture. Cultural displays and artifacts are housed in a replica of Big Jonathan House. Visitors can make the journey from Minto by boat to visit the original structure down the Yukon River at Fort Selkirk, an important historic and cultural site for the Northern Tutchone people.

== History ==
The Selkirk First Nation community was established as a ferry crossing and a highway construction camp when the Klondike Highway from Whitehorse to Dawson City was built in 1950. With the completion of the Pelly River bridge and the road to Dawson City, sternwheeler traffic on the Yukon River came to a halt. Fort Selkirk, located near the confluence of Pelly and Yukon Rivers, was virtually abandoned. The Government of Canada forced members of Selkirk First Nation to move from Fort Selkirk to Minto Landing before settling at Pelly Crossing. Today, the restored Fort Selkirk is a common stop for Yukon River travelers.

== Geography ==
Pelly Crossing is located on the Pelly River, 155 miles south of Dawson City on the Klondike Highway.

=== Climate ===
Pelly Crossing has a severely continental subarctic climate (Dfc) with short but warm summers, but with the vast majority of the year being dominated by the bitterly cold winters. During cold snaps temperatures approaching −60 °C (−76 °F) has been recorded. The weather is rather dry and summer nights remain cool.

Climate data for Pelly Ranch, Yukon (1981–2010): 445m
| Month | Jan | Feb | Mar | Apr | May | Jun | Jul | Aug | Sep | Oct | Nov | Dec | Year |
|---|---|---|---|---|---|---|---|---|---|---|---|---|---|
| Record high °C (°F) | 10.0 (50.0) | 12.2 (54.0) | 12.8 (55.0) | 23.5 (74.3) | 32.5 (90.5) | 35.0 (95.0) | 33.0 (91.4) | 33.0 (91.4) | 25.6 (78.1) | 23.0 (73.4) | 13.9 (57.0) | 12.8 (55.0) | 35.0 (95.0) |
| Mean daily maximum °C (°F) | −19.7 (−3.5) | −12.8 (9.0) | −1.7 (28.9) | 8.3 (46.9) | 15.7 (60.3) | 21.5 (70.7) | 22.8 (73.0) | 19.8 (67.6) | 12.8 (55.0) | 1.8 (35.2) | −12.1 (10.2) | −16.7 (1.9) | 3.3 (37.9) |
| Daily mean °C (°F) | −24.9 (−12.8) | −19.5 (−3.1) | −10.6 (12.9) | 0.7 (33.3) | 8.3 (46.9) | 13.9 (57.0) | 15.8 (60.4) | 12.8 (55.0) | 6.5 (43.7) | −2.5 (27.5) | −16.3 (2.7) | −21.9 (−7.4) | −3.1 (26.3) |
| Mean daily minimum °C (°F) | −30.1 (−22.2) | −26.2 (−15.2) | −19.4 (−2.9) | −6.8 (19.8) | 0.9 (33.6) | 5.8 (42.4) | 8.7 (47.7) | 5.7 (42.3) | 0.3 (32.5) | −6.7 (19.9) | −20.4 (−4.7) | −27.0 (−16.6) | −9.6 (14.7) |
| Record low °C (°F) | −58.9 (−74.0) | −60.0 (−76.0) | −50.0 (−58.0) | −38.3 (−36.9) | −12.2 (10.0) | −4.0 (24.8) | −2.8 (27.0) | −7.0 (19.4) | −20.0 (−4.0) | −37.0 (−34.6) | −51.0 (−59.8) | −56.7 (−70.1) | −60.0 (−76.0) |
| Average precipitation mm (inches) | 19.7 (0.78) | 14.9 (0.59) | 10.6 (0.42) | 8.9 (0.35) | 27.2 (1.07) | 38.5 (1.52) | 58.0 (2.28) | 41.4 (1.63) | 31.6 (1.24) | 24.5 (0.96) | 25.8 (1.02) | 19.4 (0.76) | 320.5 (12.62) |
| Average snowfall cm (inches) | 19.7 (7.8) | 14.9 (5.9) | 10.5 (4.1) | 5.1 (2.0) | 0.5 (0.2) | 0.0 (0.0) | 0.0 (0.0) | 0.0 (0.0) | 2.7 (1.1) | 15.6 (6.1) | 25.8 (10.2) | 19.4 (7.6) | 114.2 (45) |
| Average precipitation days (≥ 0.2 mm) | 8.7 | 6.8 | 5.0 | 4.8 | 10.5 | 11.3 | 14.4 | 12.5 | 11.5 | 10.7 | 10.8 | 9.1 | 116.1 |
| Average snowy days (≥ 0.2 cm) | 8.7 | 6.8 | 5.0 | 2.6 | 0.2 | 0.0 | 0.0 | 0.0 | 1.2 | 7.3 | 10.8 | 9.1 | 51.8 |
Source: Environment and Climate Change Canada

== Demographics ==
Federal census population history of Pelly Crossing
| Year | Pop. | ±% |
|---|---|---|
| 1981 | 182 | — |
| 1986 | 177 | −2.7% |
| 1991 | 216 | +22.0% |
| 1996 | 238 | +10.2% |
| 2001 | 328 | +37.8% |
| 2006 | 296 | −9.8% |
| 2011 | 336 | +13.5% |
| 2016 | 353 | +5.1% |
| 2021 | 316 | −10.5% |
Source: Statistics Canada

In the 2021 Census of Population conducted by Statistics Canada, Pelly Crossing had a population of 316 living in 139 of its 159 total private dwellings, a change of -10.5% from its 2016 population of 353. With a land area of 32.28 km^{2} (12.46 sq mi), it had a population density of 9.8/km^{2} (25.4/sq mi) in 2021.

== Attractions ==
The local community is based on hunting, trapping, fishing and guiding. There is a school, curling rink, baseball field, swimming pool, and youth centre.

== Sports ==
Every February, Pelly Crossing hosts a checkpoint for the long-distance Yukon Quest sled dog race.
