= Kwanlin Dün First Nation =

Indigenous people of Yukon Territory, Canada

Kwanlin Dün First Nation Band No. 500
- People: Southern Tutchone, Tagish, Tlingit
- Territory: Yukon

Population (2022)
- On reserve: 6
- On other land: 590
- Off reserve: 428
- Total population: 1024

Government
- Chief: Sean Smith

Website
- https://www.kwanlindun.com/

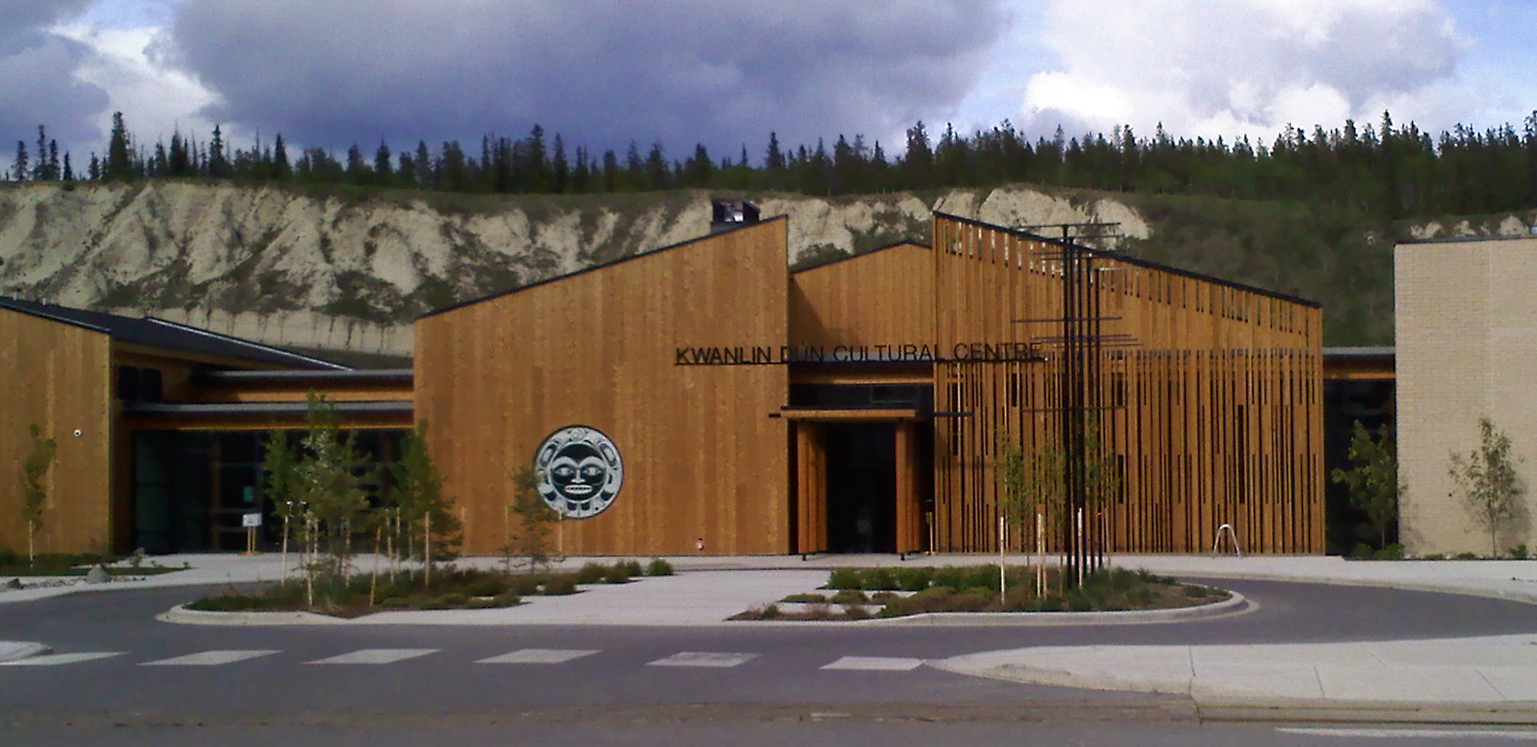
Kwanlin Dün Cultural Centre in Whitehorse

The Kwanlin Dün First Nation (KDFN) or Kwänlin Dän kwächʼǟn (″Whitehorse People″) is located in and around Whitehorse in Yukon, Canada.

The Kwanlin Dün is the largest First Nation in Yukon. Linguistically, the Kwanlin Dün are affiliated with the Southern Tutchone Tribal Council. The Kwanlin Dün include members who are Southern Tutchone, Tagish Ḵwáan (Tágür kwächʼan - "Carcross-Tagish People"), and Tlingit (Łìngit - "Coast People").

== Territory ==
Their traditional territory extends from Marsh Lake to Lake Laberge (Tàa’an Mǟn - “Head of the Lake”) along the Yukon River (Southern Tutchone name: Tágà Shäw, Tagish name: Tahgàh Cho - both meaning "big river").

== Name ==
Their name is referring to a section of the Yukon River from Miles Canyon Basalts to the White Horse Rapids which their ancestors called Kwanlin in Southern Tutchone meaning "running water through canyon". Together with the Southern Tutchone word Dän or Dün for ″people″, they referred to this location for naming the KDFN.

== Government ==
The Kwanlin Dün First Nation signed a land claims and self-government agreement on February 19, 2005. As part of the land claim agreement, KDFN received 1042 km^{2} of Settlement Land within the traditional territory. Over 30 km^{2} of KDFN's Settlement Land are within the City of Whitehorse boundaries.

As a self-governing First Nation, KDFN has its own constitution. Doris Bill was elected as the Chief of the First Nation in March 2014, succeeding Rick O'Brien. Council members as of 2014-2015 are: Jessie Dawson, Judy Gingell, Charlene Charlie, Sean Smith, Alicia Vance, Howard MacIntosh, Dennis Calbery, and Youth Council representative Tayler Vallevand-Vance.

== Programs ==
KDFN was involved in the building of a new Kwanlin Dün Cultural Centre on the banks of the Yukon River, in downtown Whitehorse. The official opening of the Kwanlin Dün Cultural Centre occurred in June 2012.

Youth For Lateral Kindness
