= Kluane First Nation =

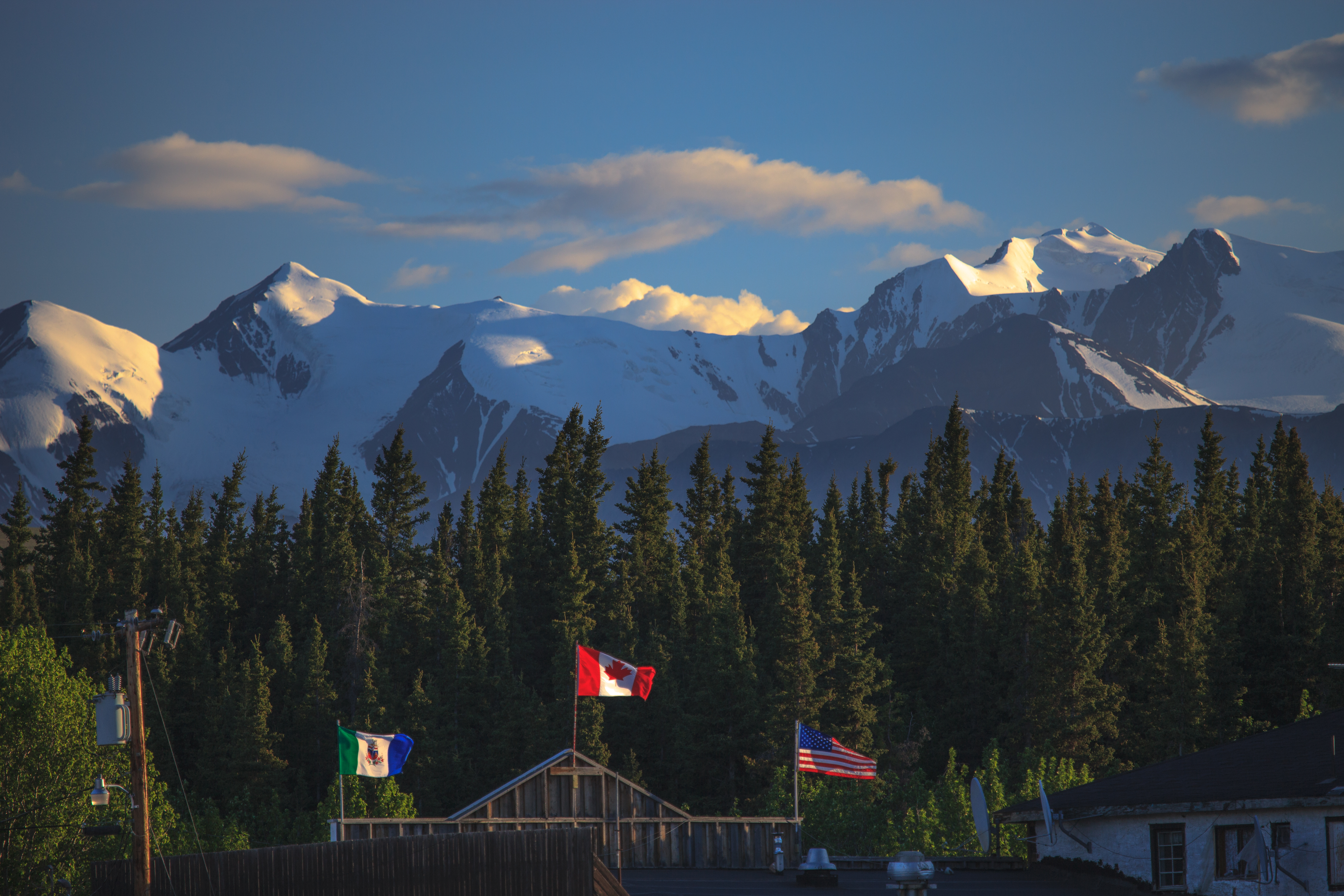

The Kluane First Nation (KFN) is a First Nations band government in Yukon, Canada. Its main centre is in Burwash Landing, Yukon along the Alaska Highway on the shores of Kluane Lake, the territory's largest lake. The native language spoken by the people of this First Nation is Southern Tutchone. They call themselves after the great Lake Lù’àn Män Ku Dän or Lù’àn Mun Ku Dän (″Kluane Lake People″).

The Kluane people occupy a traditional territory that extends from the St. Elias Mountains in the south, bounded to the east by the southern end of Kluane Lake and the A'ay Chu (formerly Slims River), by the Ruby Range to the north, extending almost to the Nisling River, and on the west by the Yukon Alaska Border. It includes the Tachal Region of Kluane National Park and Reserve.

Growing from the shores of Kluane Lake in all directions is Ä sì Keyi, (My Grandfather’s Country) a boreal forest nation, that stretches to the Ruby and Nisling mountain ranges to the northeast and the St. Elias Mountains to the southwest. The Kluane Lake area is the traditional territory of the Lù’àn Män Ku Dän, the Kluane Lake People. The majority of the First Nation people from this area identify themselves as descendants of Southern Tutchone speakers and follow a matriarchal moiety system of two clans, Khanjet (Crow Clan) or Ägunda (WolfClan). Other ancestors of the Kluane First Nation came from nations such as the Tlingit, Upper Tanana and Northern Tutchone.

— Kluane First Nation website, https://kfn.ca/about-kfn/

Within this region, the three main defining topographic feature are the St. Elias Mountains to the south and west, the Shakwak Trench, which includes Kluane Lake, and the Kluane and Ruby Range to the east and north, which are part of the Yukon Plateau. the region is characterized by extremes of elevation, including some of the highest mountains in Canada, extreme temperature (−62 °C (−80 °F) to 32 °C (90 °F)), low precipitation, wind and widespread permafrost.

Kluane First Nation is a Self-Governing First Nation with a Constitutionally protected Final Land Claims agreement and a Self-Government Agreement. These agreements were signed in October 2003 - the parties to the agreement are Government of Canada, Government of Yukon and the Kluane First Nation.

The Kluane First Nation signed a land claims agreement in 2003.
