= Fort Selkirk =

Former Yukon Territory trading post, Canada

Coordinates: 62°46′N 137°23′W

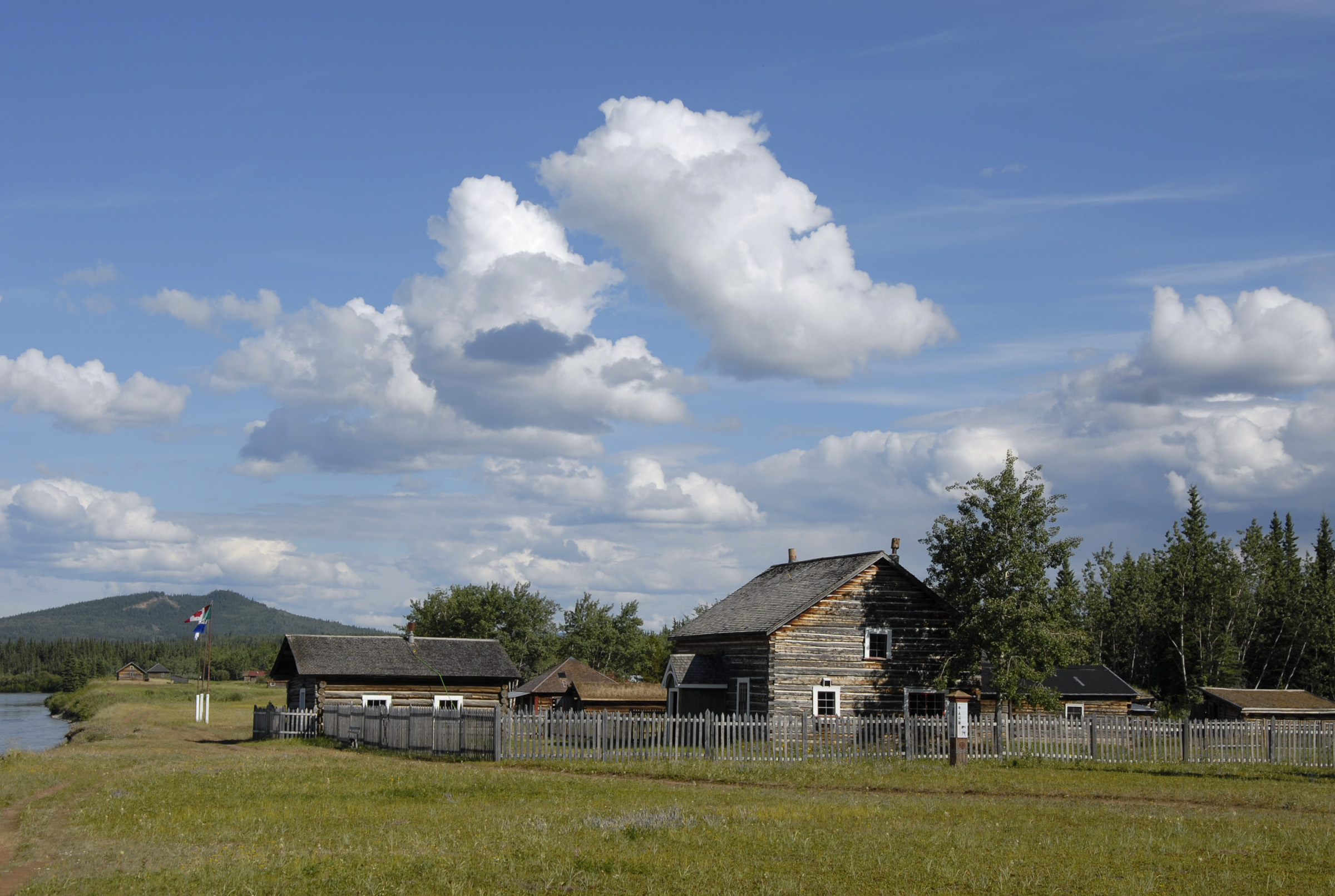
Some of the historic buildings at Fort Selkirk, Yukon. Mountain in background is Ne Ch'e Ddhawa.

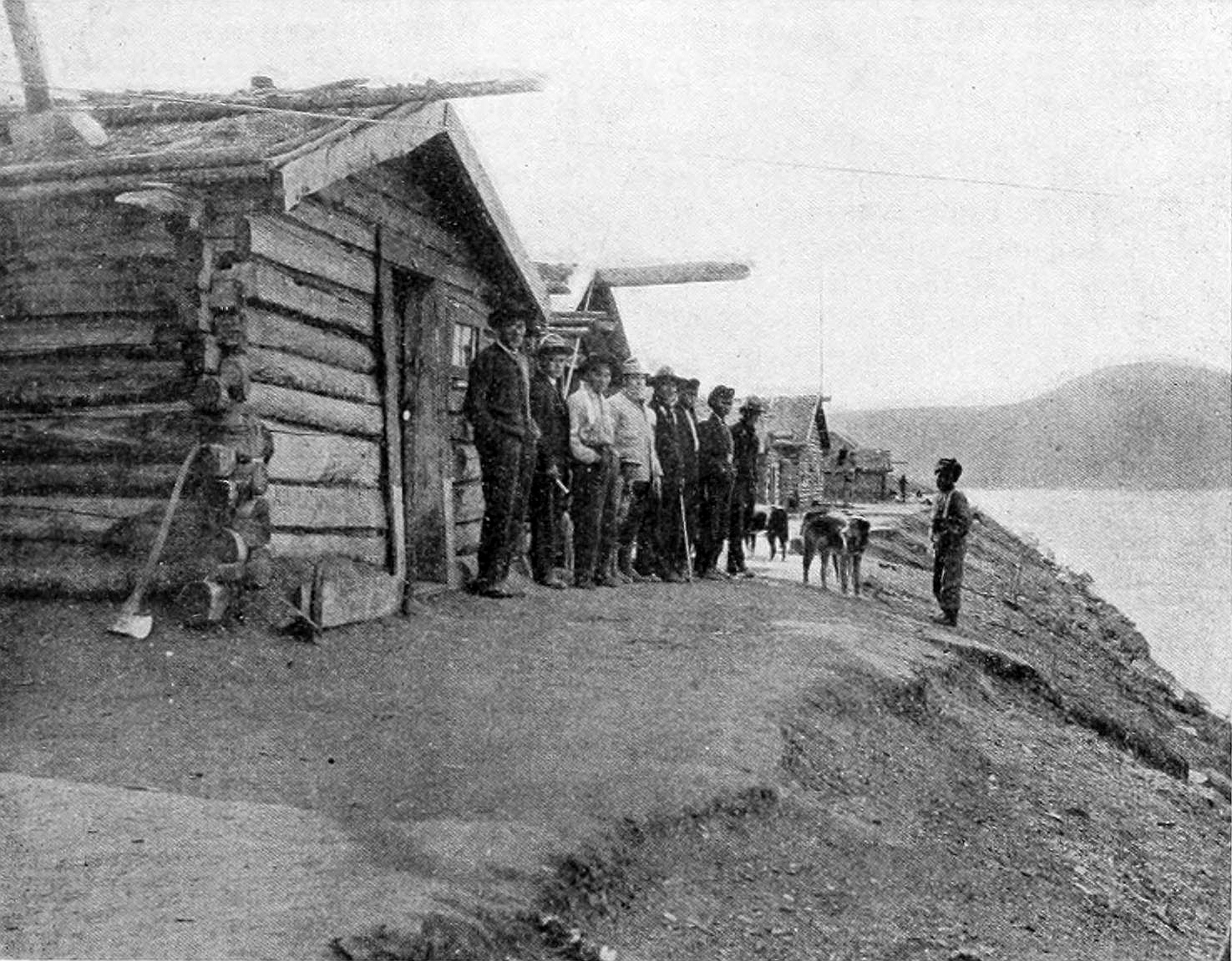
Fort Selkirk (1898)

Fort Selkirk is a former trading post on the Yukon River at the confluence of the Pelly River in Canada's Yukon. For many years it was home to the Selkirk First Nation (Northern Tutchone).

== Climate ==
On February 3, 1947, a temperature of –65 °C (–85 °F) was recorded in Fort Selkirk, which would’ve been considered the coldest temperature in North America. However, the thermometer that was used was placed on the outside wall of a building instead of a standard instrument shelter, so the record was disqualified.

The coldest official temperature recorded in Fort Selkirk was –60 °C (–76 °F) on February 3 and 4, 1968 at the Pelly Ranch Farm.

== History ==
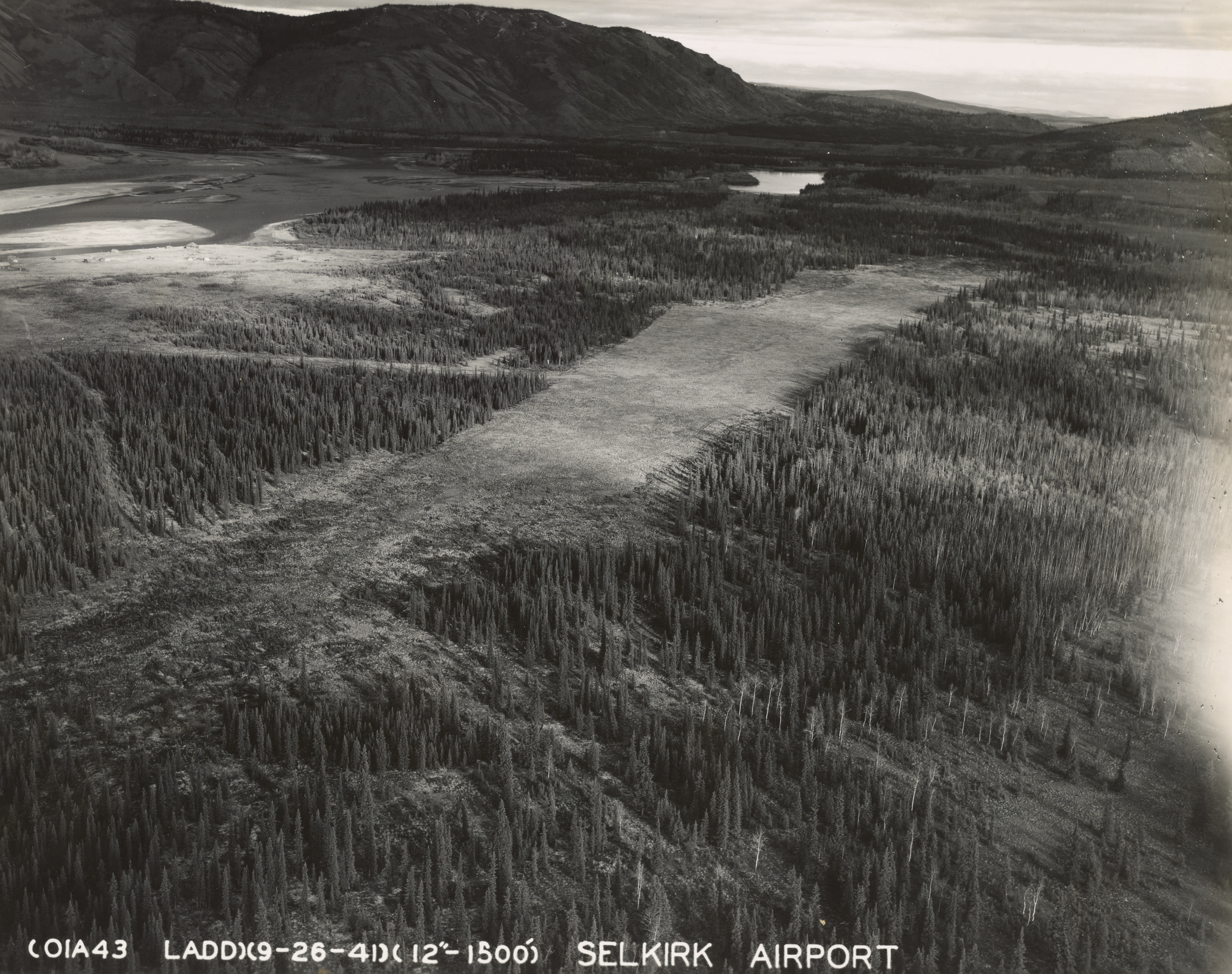
Fort Selkirk Airstrip, 1930s

Archaeological evidence shows that the site has been in use for at least 8,000 years.

Robert Campbell established a Hudson's Bay Company trading post nearby in 1848. In early 1852, he moved the post to its current location. Resenting the interference of the Hudson's Bay Company with their traditional trade with interior Athabaskan First Nations, Chilkat Tlingit First Nation warriors attacked and looted the post that summer on Saturday, August 21, 1852.

The fort was rebuilt about 40 years later and became an important supply point along the Yukon River.

Fort Selkirk was essentially abandoned by the mid-1950s after the Klondike Highway bypassed it and Yukon River traffic died down.

== Restoration and historic status ==
Many of the buildings have been restored and the Fort Selkirk Historic Site is owned and managed jointly by the Selkirk First Nation and the Yukon Government's Department of Tourism and Culture. There is no road access. Most visitors get there by boat, though there is an airstrip, Fort Selkirk Aerodrome, at the site.

== See also ==
- Volcano Mountain
- Fort Selkirk Volcanic Field
- Ne Ch'e Ddhawa
- Fort Yukon, Alaska
