= Little Salmon/Carmacks First Nation =

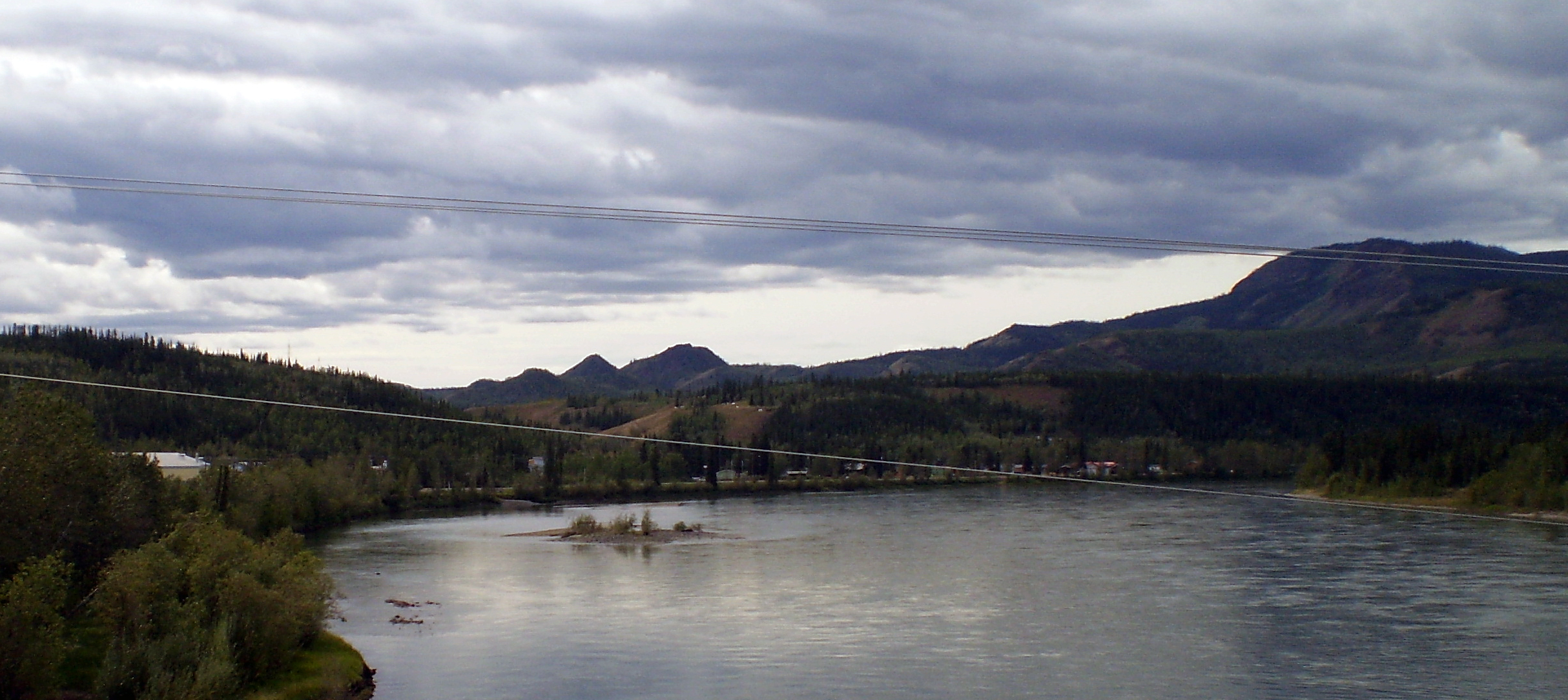
Carmacks, Yukon Territory, as seen in August 2009 from the Yukon River bridge.

The Little Salmon/Carmacks First Nation is a First Nation in the central Yukon Territory in Canada. Its original population centre was Little Salmon, Yukon, but most of its citizens live in Carmacks, Yukon. The language originally spoken by the Little Salmon/Carmacks First Nation people was Northern Tutchone. They call themselves Tagé Cho Hudän (Big River People).

Former Chief Roddy Blackjack was an architect of the Yukon Land Claims agreement. The Little Salmon/Carmacks First Nation signed the land claims agreement in 1997.

A former chief of the First Nation, Eric Fairclough, was leader of the Yukon New Democratic Party and leader of the opposition in the Yukon Legislative Assembly.
