= Selkirk First Nation =

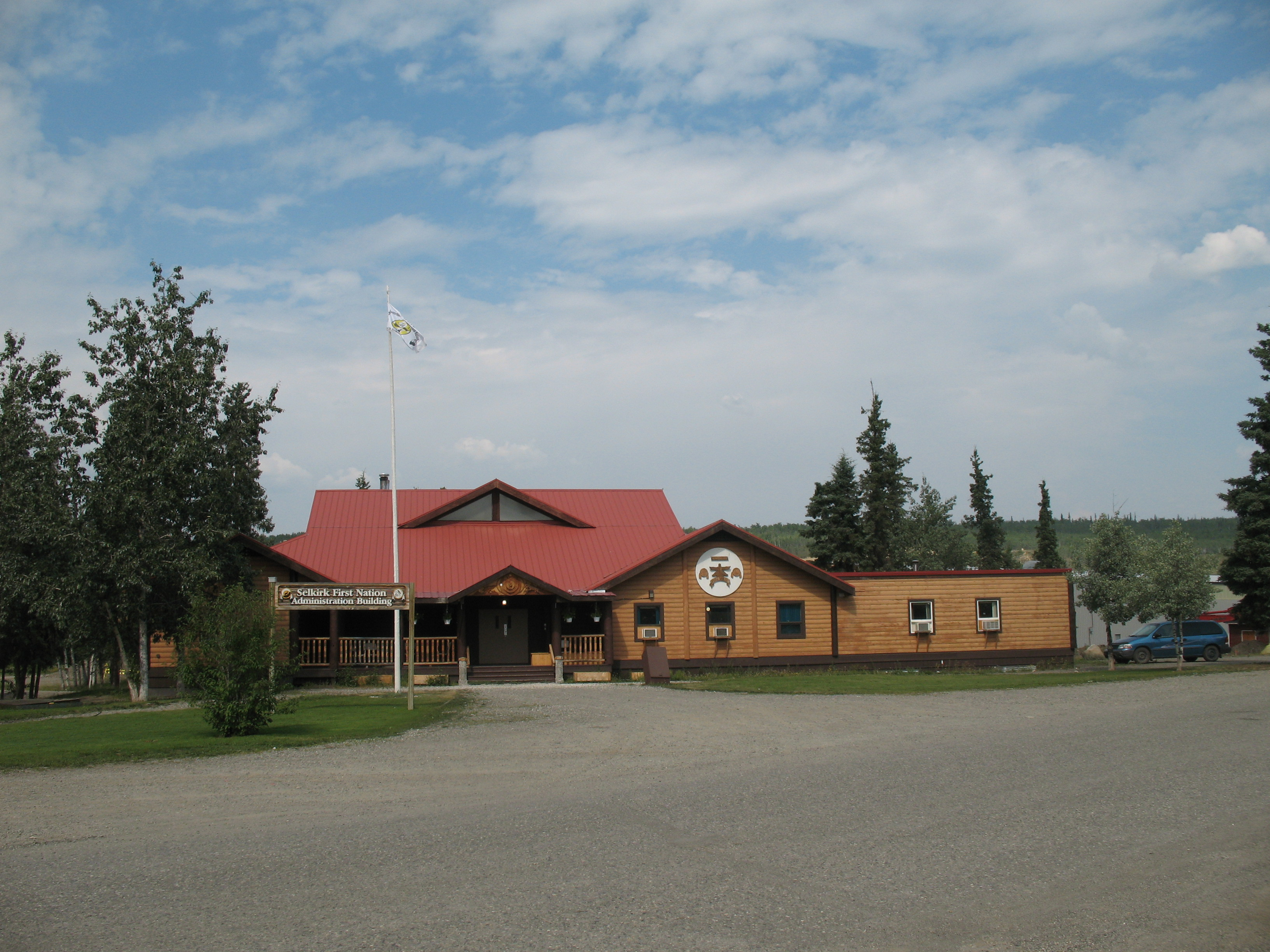
The Selkirk First Nation administrative building

The Selkirk First Nation (Hucha Hudan people) is a First Nation self-government in the Canadian territory, Yukon. Its original population centre was the trading post of Fort Selkirk, Yukon, along the Yukon River, but most of its citizens now live in Pelly Crossing, Yukon where the Klondike Highway crosses the Pelly River. The language originally spoken by the Selkirk people was Northern Tutchone. There is a great effort to preserve the language and culture, as can be seen by the popularity of the Selkirk "Keeper of the Songs", Jerry Alfred.

The Selkirk First Nation signed a Yukon Land Claims agreement in 1997.
