= Southern Tutchone =

First Nations people of southern Yukon Territory

Dän
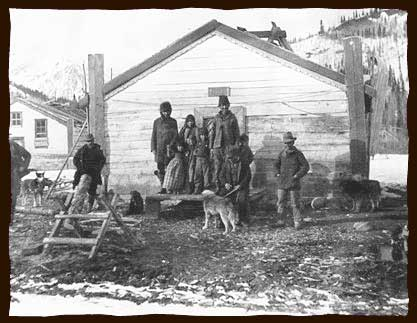
- Southern Tutchone residents of the now-abandoned village of Neskatahin

Regions with significant populations
- Yukon

Languages
- Southern Tutchone

Dän / Dün "person"
- People: Dän / Dün
- Language: Dän Kʼè
- Country: Dákéyi / Dän Keyi, Denendeh

Map of traditional territory of the Southern Tutchone

The Southern Tutchone are a First Nations people of the Athabaskan-speaking ethnolinguistic group living mainly in the southern Yukon in Canada. The Southern Tutchone language, traditionally spoken by the Southern Tutchone people, is a variety of the Tutchone language, part of the Athabaskan language family. Some linguists suggest that Northern and Southern Tutchone are distinct and separate languages.

Southern Tutchone First Nations governments and communities include:

- Champagne and Aishihik First Nations (Haines Junction, Champagne, and Aishihik in Yukon) Many Champagne and Aishihik members also live in Whitehorse.
- Ta'an Kwach'an Council (Whitehorse, Yukon and Lake Laberge) (Ta’an Kwäch’än - ″People of Lake Laberge″, because they called it Tàa'an Män)
- Kluane First Nation (Burwash Landing, Yukon) (Lù’àn Män Ku Dän or Lù’àn Mun Ku Dän - ″Kluane Lake People″, referring to their territory around Kluane Lake).

Many citizens of the Kwanlin Dün First Nation (Kwänlin Dän kwächʼǟn - "Whitehorse people", formerly White Horse Indian Band) in Whitehorse are of Southern Tutchone origin; their name refers to a section of the Yukon River from Miles Canyon Basalts to the White Horse Rapids which their ancestors called Kwanlin meaning "running water through canyon” and together with the Southern Tutchone word Dän or Dün for ″people″, they referred to this location for naming the KDFN)

== Language ==
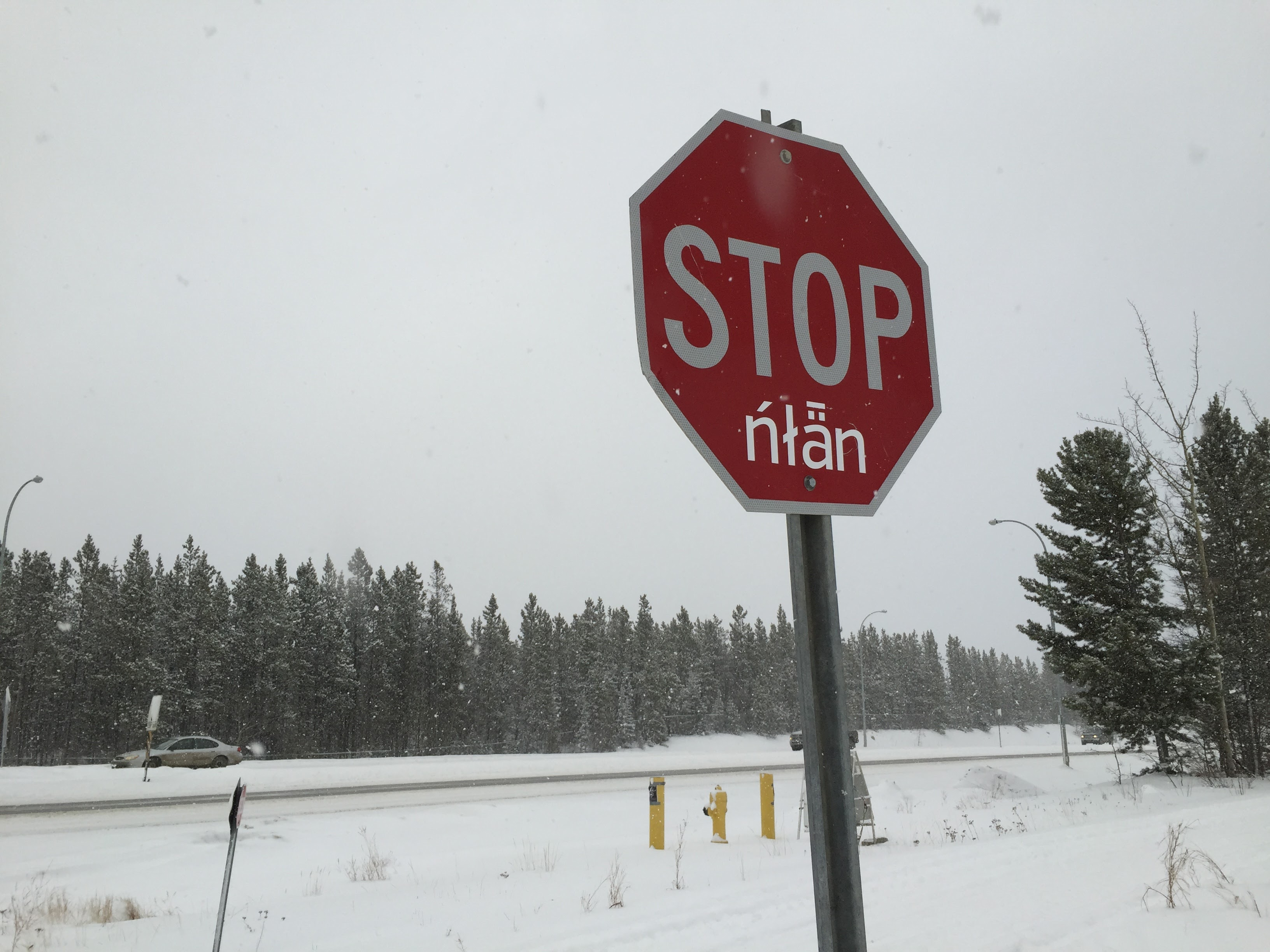
ńłǟn, a Southern Tutchone word, added to stop signs in the McIntyre subdivision of Whitehorse. It means, 'stop that now', as there is no exact translation. This initiative is to promote language.

The Southern Tutchone people named by the late Catharine McClellan; are a group of Athabaskan speaking indigenous people of Southern Yukon, Canada. Today, the Southern Tutchone language is more often being called, "Dän kʼe" which means 'our way' or, "Dän k'e kwänje" which means 'our way of speaking' in the Athabaskan language. This territory stretches over the south-west Yukon, and is controversial in what is overlap with different indigenous groups of people in Yukon. The Tutchone language was separated into two groups by McClellan in which she called them Southern and Northern Tutchone. The languages themselves are close, but are different in subtle dialects.

== Demographics ==
In the early 1950s there were close to 20,000 Southern Tutchone speaking individuals. This has since plummeted to less than a few hundred speakers. As of 2004 the number of individuals who spoke Southern Tutchone as their first language was 404, and the total number of individuals who had some knowledge of the language was 645.

== Revitalization efforts ==
The Southern Tutchone language is an endangered language with fewer than 100 speakers. There have been revitalization efforts in place to help combat the dwindling numbers. This includes signage throughout the Yukon highlighting the language. Other revitalization efforts includes an adult immersion program focused on increasing the number of speakers in the Champagne and Aishihik traditional territory. In 2015 the Champagne and Aishihik First Nations launched the first Da Ku Nän Ts'tthèt (Our House is Waking Up the Land) dance festival which focused on Southern Tutchone language and culture. This was hosted at the cultural centre named Da Ku, meaning "our house" in Southern Tutchone. Efforts for revitalization have also included school programs throughout the territory, as well as a language nest in Haines Junction, Yukon. The Yukon Native Language Centre has played a key role in many revitalization efforts as they have developed Indigenous teacher education programs, as well as curriculum materials.

== Landclaims ==
In other places in the Southern Tutchone region there are four First Nations governments that have settled their land claims in the Southern Tutchone cultural area these include:

- Champagne and Aishihik First Nations (Haines Junction)
- Ta'an Kwach'an Council (Lake Laberge)
- Kluane First Nation (Burwash Landing)
- Kwanlin Dün First Nations (Whitehorse)

== See also ==
- Jim Boss

== Sources ==
- MacClellan, C. (1987). Part of the land, part of the water: a history of the Yukon Indians.
- Vancouver: Douglas & McIntyre.
- McClellan, C. (2001) My Old People Say: an Ethnographic Survey of Southern Yukon Territory. Canadian Museum of Civilization.
- https://cafn.ca/about/our-ways/
- https://cyfn.ca/agreements/umbrella-final-agreement/
