= Yukon Land Claims =

Process of negotiating and settling Indigenous land claim agreements in Yukon, Canada

The Yukon Land Claims refer to the process of negotiating and settling Indigenous land claim agreements in Yukon, Canada between First Nations and the federal government. Based on historic occupancy and use, the First Nations claim basic rights to all the lands.

== History ==
Unlike other parts of Canada, Yukon First Nations did not conclude any treaties until the 1990s. Chief Jim Boss of the Ta'an Kwach'an had requested compensation from the Canadian government for lost lands and hunting grounds as a result of the Klondike Gold Rush in 1902. Boss' letter was ignored by the federal government. It was not until the 1970s that the issue was raised again.

The current process started in 1973 with the publication of Together Today For our Children Tomorrow by Chief Elijah Smith. Negotiations took place in the late 1970s and early 1980s, culminating in an agreement which was ultimately rejected.

Negotiations resumed in the late 1980s and culminated to the "Umbrella Final Agreement" (UFA) in 1990. The UFA is used as the framework or template for individual agreements with each of the fourteen Yukon First Nations recognized by the federal government. It was signed in 1993 and the first four First Nations ratified their land claims agreements in 1995. To date (January, 2016), eleven of the fourteen First Nations have signed and ratified an agreement. Presently, White River First Nation, Liard First Nation and Ross River Dena Council are not negotiating. They remain Indian Bands under the federal Indian Act.

Unlike most other Canadian land claims agreements that apply only to Status Indians, the Yukon First Nations insisted that the agreements involve everyone they considered part of their nation, whether they were recognized as Status Indians or not under federal government rules. In 1973, the Yukon Indian Brotherhood and the Yukon Association of Non-Status Indians formed the Council for Yukon Indians (CYI) to negotiate a land claims agreement. The two organizations and the Council formally merged in 1980 under the name of Council for Yukon Indians. In 1995, CYI was renamed to the Council of Yukon First Nations.

== Prior to the agreement ==
Before Yukon First Nations regained their self governance, the federal government regulated how they could use their land. Before the agreement, Yukon First Nations claimed the land and resources in Yukon as all under their ownership. This was based on traditional occupancy and use of that land. But, all affairs in Yukon were controlled by Indian and Northern Affairs Canada (INAC). INAC had the responsibility to establish programs related to law, land reserves, health, social services, and housing. Yukon First Nation bands implemented these programs, but had no authority to modify them.

== The Yukon Native Brotherhood ==
In 1968, Chief Elijah Smith founded the Yukon Native Brotherhood with 12 Yukon First Nation bands. This brotherhood was formed in order to voice the Yukon First Nations rights. This was an important event for the progress towards the UFA and ultimately self governing.

== Together Today for Our Children Tomorrow ==
In January 1973, Chief Elijah Smith wrote Together Today for Our Children Tomorrow. Smith, together with a delegation of other Yukon elders, including Roddy Blackjack of the Little Salmon/Carmacks First Nation, presented this text to Prime Minister Pierre Trudeau as the basis of the Yukon First Nations' claim to regain independence and self-governing authority.

In the introduction, Smith writes about the Yukon Native Brotherhood seeking a settlement that is fair and just both for the Yukon First Nations and the Government of Canada. In the second part, Smith discusses the struggles of the Aboriginals of Canada in recent history since European colonization, which altered their lives. Smith highlighted the major events that altered the Aboriginals' way of life. He included the Fur Trade, the Klondike Gold Rush of 1896, Residential Schools, and construction of the Alaska highway. In the third part, he explored contemporary issues of the early 1970s. Smith tried to break the stereotype of the Yukon Aboriginals at the time, challenging stereotypes by the Whiteman. Smith also provided the Aboriginals perspective on the Whiteman. He acknowledges the distinction between the cultures of the Whiteman and the Aboriginals, saying that is why the Aboriginals must have the ability to manage their own societies. Smith demonstrates that such a settlement can benefit the future generations. In the fourth part, titled "Tomorrow," Smith explained how the Yukon First Nations would use their independence if a settlement was reached. He noted eight different areas they would focus on:

=== Programs ===
He describes Canadian Government programs that did not benefit the Aboriginal population in Yukon, and in some cases did more harm than good. To change this, the Yukon First Nations will remove certain programs, and simultaneously implement new programs better tailored to their needs.

=== Our Old People ===
The proposed settlement would benefit the elderly population of the Yukon society, who were living in senior citizen homes being taken care of by White administrators. He suggested they should move back into their villages and be cared for by their own people, with financial support through the Settlement Fund. This would also enable the elderly to pass down their wisdom to future generations, keeping alive the strengths of the Aboriginal culture.

=== Our Cultural Identity ===
Smith also focuses on the cultural importance of the Yukon First Nations. He states that the younger generations must be informed of their heritage in order to preserve it. In the past, the younger people were taught to be ashamed of their heritage, but this can be changed with a settlement. By forming a settlement, the Yukon society will be able to focus on their culture without being influenced by the Whiteman.

=== Community Development ===
Many of the communities in Yukon were extremely underdeveloped. Poor health, low income, poor housing, and unemployment are just a few factors that contributed to the poor state of these communities. Smith suggests that with the settlement, many communities will be able to create municipal governments. They could revive development and make better progress.

=== Education ===
Smith explains how the education provided by the Canadian Government is not relevant to the values and beliefs of the Yukon Aboriginals. The Canadian government provides education regarding the economy, and primarily encourages students to go onto post secondary education. Smith believes that if Yukon First Nations are provided with the ability to change the education system, they would be able to create relevant and fitting programs for Aboriginal people. Programs could include education about the land, art, and craft.

=== Economic Development ===
In Yukon, the majority of businesses were controlled by white employers. Smith said that Aboriginals had to be given a chance to take a bigger responsibility in the economic spectrum. He notes that the Yukon Native Brotherhood had proposed multiple economic development projects.

=== Communications ===
He noted that Aboriginals of Yukon must have the option to create and distribute their own views through radio, TV, and newspapers.

=== Research ===
Lastly, Smith makes a point about privatized research about the progress in Yukon. He states that Yukon First Nations will conduct research, but it must benefit their own communities instead of the outside ones. Smith notes organizations necessary to manage land, money, and programs in Yukon. He concluded: "The first five years of the implementation will tell if this Settlement will be able to do for our children what we plan it to do".

== Provisions of agreements ==
=== Umbrella Final Agreement (UFA) ===
The Umbrella Final Agreement was the framework for negotiating individual Yukon First Nation Final and Self-Government Agreements. The UFA provided for a total amount of compensation and a land quantum amounting to about 8.5 per cent of the Yukon's area to be returned to First Nations. Most of the land is owned outright by First Nation governments, although a number of existing reserves were also retained. It also called for the creation of a number of boards and committees to provide community-based input, recommendations, and decisions to government.

The 11 First Nations signatories to the agreement are:

- Champagne and Aishihik First Nations
- First Nation of Na-Cho Nyäk Dun
- Teslin Tlingit Council
- Vuntut Gwitchin First Nation
- Little Salmon/Carmacks First Nation
- Selkirk First Nation
- Tr’ondëk Hwëch’in
- Ta’an Kwäch’än Council
- Kluane First Nation
- Kwanlin Dün First Nation
- Carcross/Tagish First Nation

=== Final (land claim) Agreements ===
The Final Agreements are constitutionally-protected (section 35) modern-day treaties. They define First Nations rights on Settlement Land, and within their Traditional Territory. They address a number of matters including heritage, fish and wildlife, non-renewable resources, water management, forestry, taxation, financial compensation, economic development measures and land owned and managed by the First Nation.

=== Self-Government Agreements ===
Each land claims agreement is also accompanied by a Self-Government agreement that gives First Nations the right to enact legislation in a number of areas. These agreements provide First Nations with the power to control and direct their own affairs and outline the ability of a First Nation to assume responsibility for delivering programs or services to its citizens.

Other provisions of the Land Claims agreement are the elimination of taxation exemptions for Yukon First Nations people (effective January 1, 2001), a restriction of hunting rights of other aboriginal peoples on each First Nation's traditional territory, etc.

== Final and Self-Government Agreements ==
First Nation	Signed	In Effect
Champagne and Aishihik First Nations	1993-05-29	
First Nation of Na-Cho Nyäk Dun	1993-05-29	1995-02-14
Teslin Tlingit Council	1993-05-29	
Vuntut Gwitchin First Nation	1993-05-29	
Little Salmon/Carmacks First Nation	1997-07-21	
Selkirk First Nation	1997-07-21	
Tr’ondëk Hwëch’in	1998-07-16	
Ta’an Kwäch’än Council	2002-01-13	
Kluane First Nation	2003-10-18	
Kwanlin Dün First Nation	2005-02-19	
Carcross/Tagish First Nation	2005-10-22	2006
