= SS Keno =

Steamship in Yukon, Canada

Coordinates: 64.0632°N 139.4350°W

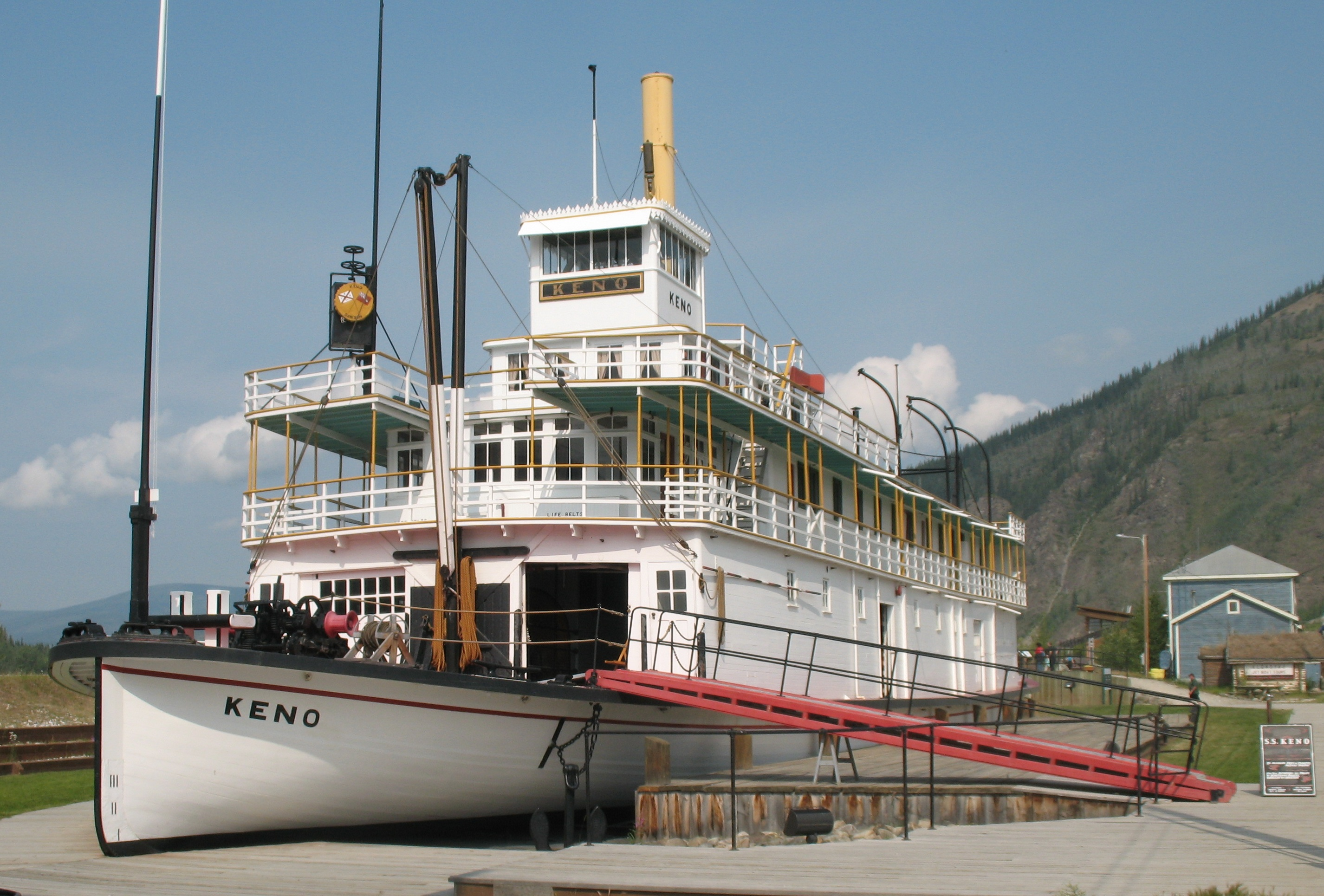
- SS Keno in dry dock in Dawson City

History

Canada
- Name: Keno
- Owner: White Pass and Yukon Route
- Operator: British Yukon Navigation Company
- Port of registry: Dawson City
- Launched: 1922
- Completed: 1922
- Maiden voyage: 15 August 1922
- Out of service: 1951
- Refit: 1937
- Status: Museum ship in Dawson City, Yukon

General characteristics
- Type: Sternwheel paddle steamer
- Tonnage: 613.05 tons
- Length: 140.6 ft (42.9 m)
- Beam: 30.4 ft (9.3 m)
- Draught: 3 ft (0.91 m)
- Decks: 3

National Historic Site of Canada
- Official name: SS Keno National Historic Site of Canada
- Designated: 1962

SS Keno is a sternwheel paddle steamer which is a National Historic Site of Canada and a unit of the Canadian national park system. It is berthed in a dry dock on the waterfront of the Yukon River in Dawson City, Yukon, Canada.

The vessel was constructed in 1922, in Whitehorse, by the British Yukon Navigation Company, a subsidiary of the White Pass and Yukon Route railway company. For most of its career it transported silver, zinc and lead ore down the Stewart River from mines in the Mayo district to the confluence of the Yukon and Stewart rivers at Stewart City. It was retired from commercial service in 1951 due to the extension and improvement of the Klondike Highway in the years after World War II.

Following its withdrawal from service the Keno was laid up at the BYN Co. shipyard in Whitehorse, before being selected for preservation and donated by the company to the Canadian Government in 1959. On 25 August 1960 Keno left Whitehorse to sail downstream to Dawson City. In doing so she became the last of the Yukon's sternwheeler steamers to navigate the Yukon River under her own power. Three days later she arrived in Dawson and was subsequently installed as a tourist attraction and a permanent memorial to the approximately 250 sternwheelers that provided a vital transport service on the Yukon River and its tributaries during the latter half of the 19th and first half of the 20th centuries.

== Background ==
The Yukon River flows for 3,190 km (1,980 mi) through Yukon and Alaska, and its catchment area covers approximately 832,700 km^{2} (321,500 mi^{2}). The Yukon's name is derived from a Gwich'in name, meaning "Great River", and the waterway has been used by aboriginal groups in the area for many centuries. From the middle of the 19th century it also formed a major transport link for white trappers, traders and mineral prospectors operating in the region, but its shallow, sinuous and fast flowing nature made navigation difficult. As early as 1869 the Alaska Commercial Company began regular sternwheel paddle steamer services as far upstream as Fort Selkirk, exploiting the sternwheeler riverboat design's inherent shallow draught, flexible landing ability and protected paddlewheel to overcome many of the river's challenges. River traffic boomed during the Klondike Gold Rush, and by the end of the 19th century around 60 sternwheelers were in operation on the Yukon.

By 1914 the White Pass and Yukon Route railway company's river navigation subsidiary, the British Yukon Navigation Company (BYN Co.), had built an effective monopoly on riverboat traffic in the upper reaches of the Yukon River. As trading and mining activities in Yukon and Alaska grew, bigger and better sternwheelers were built to cope with the increasing traffic on the main river channel. However, in order to connect to many mining camps and trading posts vessels were required to negotiate the still shallower and more tortuous channels of the Yukon's tributaries. In 1922 BYN Co. built the Keno to provide service to the booming silver mining district around Mayo Landing, in particular the United Keno Hill Mine properties, approximately 290 km (180 mi) up the narrow, winding and shallow Stewart River from its confluence with the Yukon River.

== Design and construction ==
In order to be able to navigate Stewart River, BYN Co. construction foreman A.E. Henderson specifically designed Keno for shallow water operation. As built, she was 130.5 ft (39.8 m) long, with a beam of 29.2 ft (8.9 m). For comparison, the second SS Klondike, completed eight years after Keno for service on the main river routes, was over 200 ft (61 m) long and had a beam in excess of 40 ft (12 m). Most importantly, in service the Keno's draught was typically only between two and three feet (0.61 and 0.91 m), and with a light load as little as 21 in (53 cm). Her hull was constructed from wood, carvel-built, and her superstructure was arranged in a three deck configuration typical of sternwheelers. The lowermost deck, the main deck at gunwale level, was the freight house. Above this, and approximately the same size, was the saloon deck, carrying much of the vessel's passenger accommodation and facilities. Uppermost was the smaller, punningly titled 'Texas' deck, carrying larger staterooms for the captain, senior crew and first class passengers. Surmounting the Texas was the pilothouse, from which the vessel was commanded. In this configuration, the Keno's gross register tonnage was 553.17 tons.

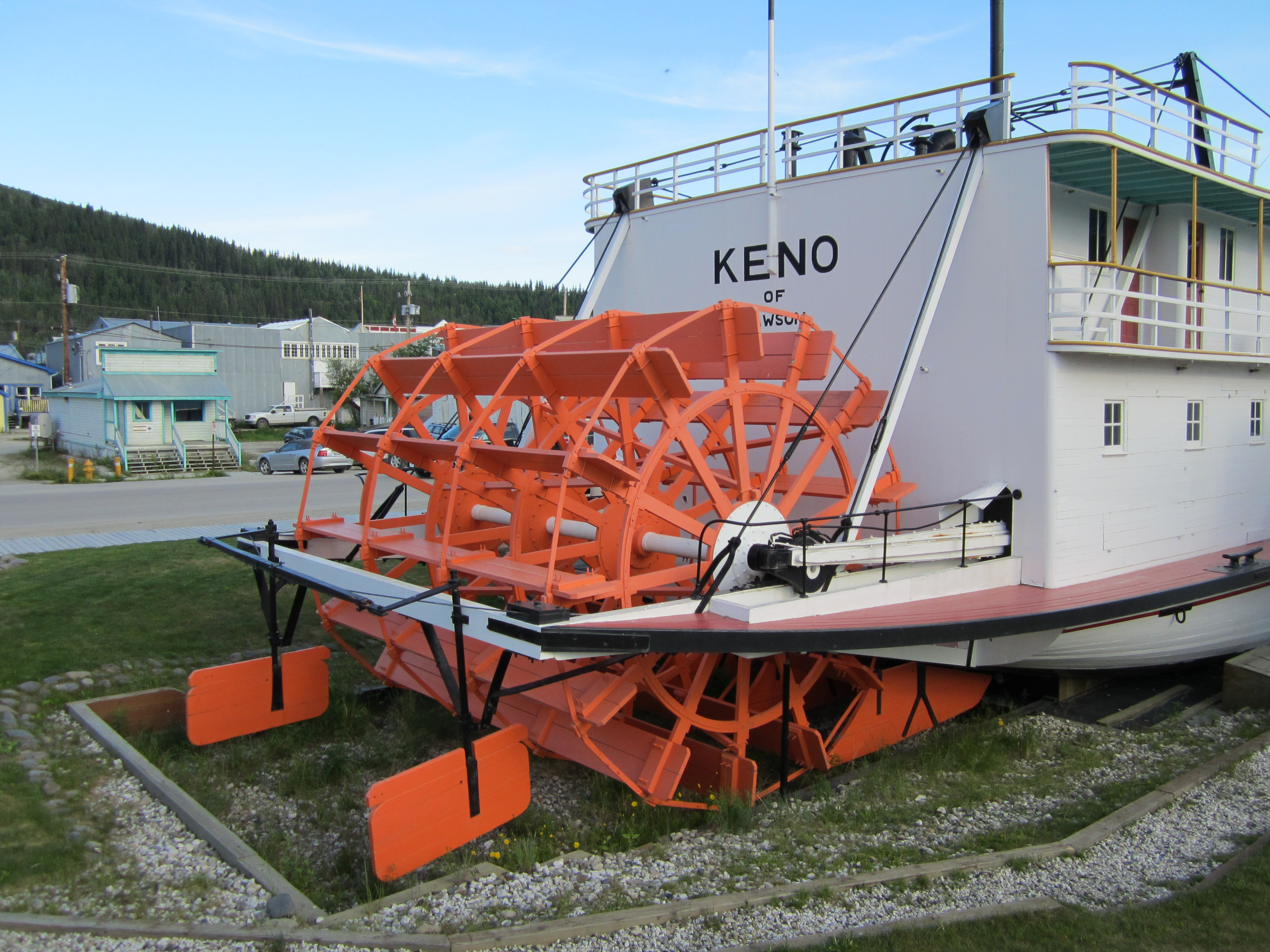
Keno's paddlewheel, with details of the driveshaft cranks, rudders and transom

Motive power for the vessel was provided by a single, wood fired, locomotive-style boiler, that fed steam to two high pressure, single-cylinder, double acting steam engines, mounted longitudinally. These in turn drove the rear paddlewheel by cranks mounted at either end of its axle. When fully laden the Keno could haul 120 short tons (109 t) loaded aboard, and was capable of pushing a barge laden with a further 225 short tons (204 t). In addition to her freight capacity, the Keno was licensed to carry up to 78 passengers, with sleeping accommodation for between 32 and 53 (records vary).

Keno was built at the company's shipyard in Whitehorse, Yukon, in the middle of 1922. Very early in her career, in 1923, the position of her paddlewheel was moved rearward by 3 ft (0.9 m) to improve her abilities when backing. Further minor modifications were made to her design in the following decade, before she was comprehensively rebuilt in 1937 in order to increase her cargo capacity. During the course of this rebuild the Keno was lengthened to 140.6 ft (42.9 m) and her beam increased to 30.4 ft (9.3 m). These and other modifications increased the ship's gross register tonnage to 613.05 tons.

== Operational career ==
The Keno was completed in time for the 1922 river traffic season (which was short on the Yukon, owing to it being ice-bound for much of the year). Her maiden voyage took place on 15 August 1922, which she made laden with a total of 120 tons of meat; 50 in her own holds and 70 loaded on a barge. However, during the majority of her career the Keno's major cargo was silver, lead and zinc ore concentrate, produced by the silver mines around Keno City and Elsa. This was loaded into sacks, each weighing approximately 125 lb (57 kg). The ore was transported by cart or sled down the Silver Trail to Mayo Landing on the river, where it was stockpiled through the winter months. Each year, once the ice cleared toward the end of the spring the Keno and her elderly stablemate, the SS Canadian, would transport the ore downriver to Stewart City, at the confluence between the Stewart and Yukon rivers. From here the BYN Co.'s larger vessels then transported the ore up the Yukon River to Whitehorse, where it was transshipped onto the White Pass and Yukon Route railroad for transportation to ocean ports at the coast. Each 125-pound (57 kg) sack was loaded and unloaded by hand at each stage of its river journey, and in 1938 alone the Keno transported over 9,000 short tons (8,165 t) of ore. On its return to Mayo Keno carried supplies and food for the mining camps. The journey upriver from Stewart to Mayo included 14 sets of rapids and took three days, while the journey in the opposite direction could be completed in just 12 hours.

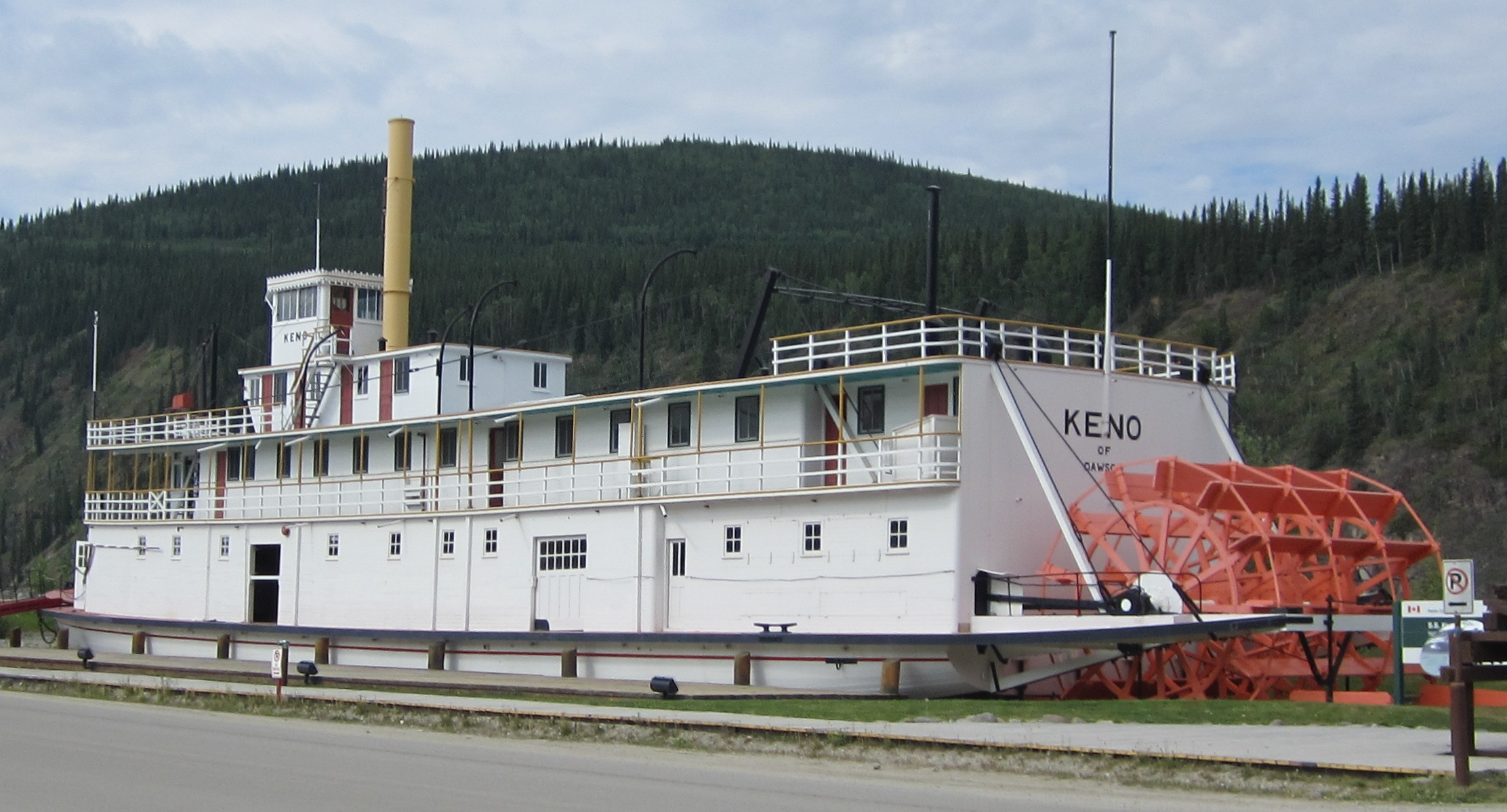
SS Keno in dry dock in Dawson City

The narrow, fast-flowing rivers were strewn with sandbars and shallowly covered rocks. Each year these could change position dramatically during the spring thaw when the river was high with meltwater; throughout the remainder of the season they kept moving, albeit more slowly. These conditions meant that even for a vessel specifically designed for the Yukon navigation was still beset by hazards, and Keno did not escape mishap. On 8 June 1927 she hit a submerged rock on the Yukon River's Big Bend, south of Whitehorse, and sank. She was raised, repaired and re-entered service. In 1933, while working on the Thirtymile River stretch of the Yukon River, the Keno was severely damaged when the barge she was pushing partially ran aground on a bend. The barge dug in, and caused the Keno to swing in the river which brought her stern in contact with the far bank. The consequent impact smashed Keno's paddlewheel and broke off her rudders. Again she was repaired and re-entered service.

Keno continued to operate in commercial service within the Yukon watershed for almost 30 years. In addition to her work on the Stewart River, her shallow draught and smaller dimensions meant that she was often pressed into service on the main Whitehorse–Dawson route early in the season, when parts of the river were narrowed by ice. In 1942 the Keno was used to transport US Army men and equipment during construction of the Alaska Highway. She was retired in 1951 after completion, extension and improvement of the Klondike Highway made road transport the cheapest and preferred method for moving goods and people around the territory. The Keno was laid up on the ways at the shipyard in Whitehorse, on the banks of the Yukon River, where she was joined by many of the surviving sternwheeler fleet a few years later after the BYN Co. ceased paddle steamer operations completely in 1955.

== National Historic Site ==
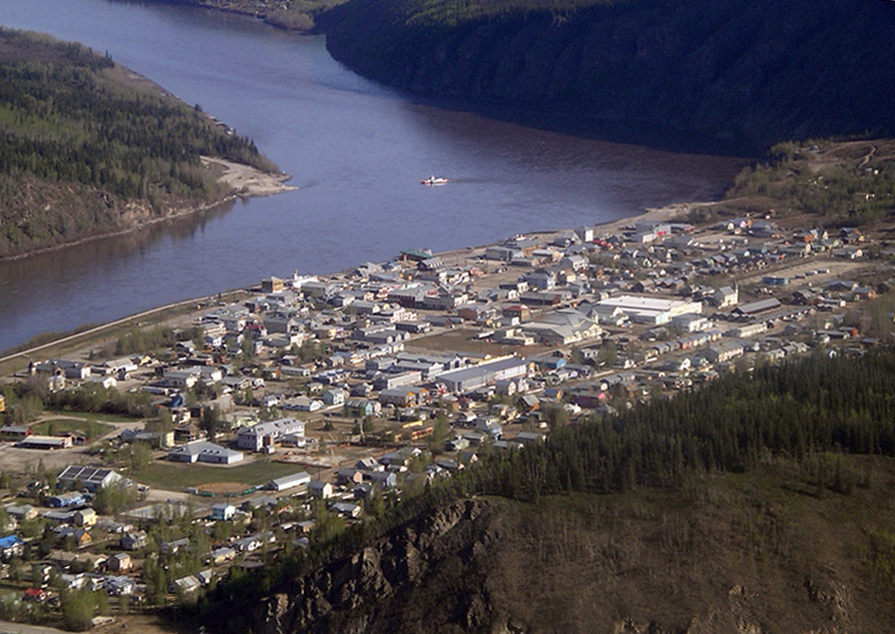
Dawson City, Yukon, with Keno's white superstructure clearly visible on the bank of the Yukon River

Late in 1958 the Historic Sites and Monuments Board of Canada (HSMBC) announced its opinion "that it is of national historic importance to preserve a typical representative or representatives of lake and river sternwheel steamship transport." In 1959 four of the surviving sternwheelers were offered by the White Pass company to the Canadian Government for preservation. The Keno, SS Casca, SS Klondike and SS Whitehorse were all out of the water in Whitehorse, and were offered to the government on an "as is, where is basis." In preparation for the forthcoming Dawson Gold Rush Festival, planned for 1962, the board decided to move one of the vessels downstream to Dawson City as a centrepiece for the celebrations. The board selected Keno to be that vessel and preparations were made for her downstream voyage.

On 20 August 1960 the Keno was re-floated from the ways at Whitehorse. Her intended pilot for the final voyage, Emil Forrest, was assisting with the process but suffered a fatal heart attack during the course of the day. While continued preparations for the trip were made to the vessel, a replacement pilot was hurriedly found. On 25 August, under the command of Captain Frank Blakely and Pilot Frank Slim, the Keno left Whitehorse for the final time with a crowd of hundreds gathered to see her off. The most significant of the preparations made to the ship before its departure from Whitehorse were modifications to her superstructure to allow her to pass under the newly constructed highway bridge at Carmacks. Erected since the cessation of steamer traffic on the river this bridge had not been designed to permit vessels as tall as Keno, let alone her larger fleetmates, to pass beneath. In order to negotiate the limited clearance Keno's pilothouse was removed and placed on the roof of the saloon deck, and her smokestack was rigged to hinge backward to lie flat against the roof of the Texas. With her hydraulic tiller installed in the observation room on the saloon deck, Pilot Slim manoeuvred the Keno under the bridge with her bow facing upstream (the better to control the downstream progress of the ship in the fast flowing river) with only 11 in (28 cm) to spare. From Carmacks her voyage down the Yukon River was relatively uneventful – she successfully negotiated both the Five Finger and Rink rapids – until she ran aground on an uncharted bar near Minto. With the assistance of CBC reporter and amateur diver Terry Delaney, she was winched off and resumed her downstream progress to Dawson.

Three days after leaving Whitehorse the Keno arrived in Dawson City, becoming the last of Yukon's sternwheeler fleet to navigate the river under her own power. She was subsequently winched up onto the banks of the river and installed in a permanent dry dock. The HSMBC spent much of the following two years completing refurbishment and restoration work on the vessel, before the Keno was officially declared a National Historic Site on 1 July, Dominion Day, 1962, during the opening ceremonies for the Dawson Festival. The vessel formed the first meeting and entertainment space for the newly formed Klondike Visitors Association tourism group, and it still forms a major tourist attraction in Dawson City. Following the destruction by fire of the second Casca and the Whitehorse in Whitehorse in 1974, and the Tutshi in Carcross in 1990, Keno is one of only three Yukon sternwheelers that survive in good condition, from a fleet that numbered at least 250 in total during the century between 1855 and 1955.

== See also ==
- Steamboats of the Yukon River
