= Northwestel =

Canadian telecommunication company

Northwestel Inc.
- Type: Subsidiary
- Industry: Telecommunications
- Founded: 1979; 47 years ago
- Headquarters: Whitehorse, Yukon, Canada
- Area served: Yukon, Northwest Territories, Nunavut, northern British Columbia and northern Alberta
- Key people: Charles Brown (chair); Curtis Shaw (president); Stan Thompson (CFO & VP Corp. Services); Andrew Pothier (VP Network & IT); Paul Gillard (VP Business Markets); Tammy April (VP Consumer Markets)
- Parent: Bell Canada (1988-present); Sixty North Unity (sale pending)
- Website: www.nwtel.ca

Northwestel Inc. (stylized as NorthwesTel) is a Canadian telecommunications company that is the incumbent local exchange carrier (ILEC) and long-distance carrier in the territories of Yukon, the Northwest Territories, Nunavut, and part of northern British Columbia and northern Alberta. Originally established in 1979 by the Canadian National Railway from CN's northern telecommunications assets, it has been owned by BCE Inc. (formerly Bell Canada Enterprises) since 1988.

== Origins ==
=== Until World War II ===
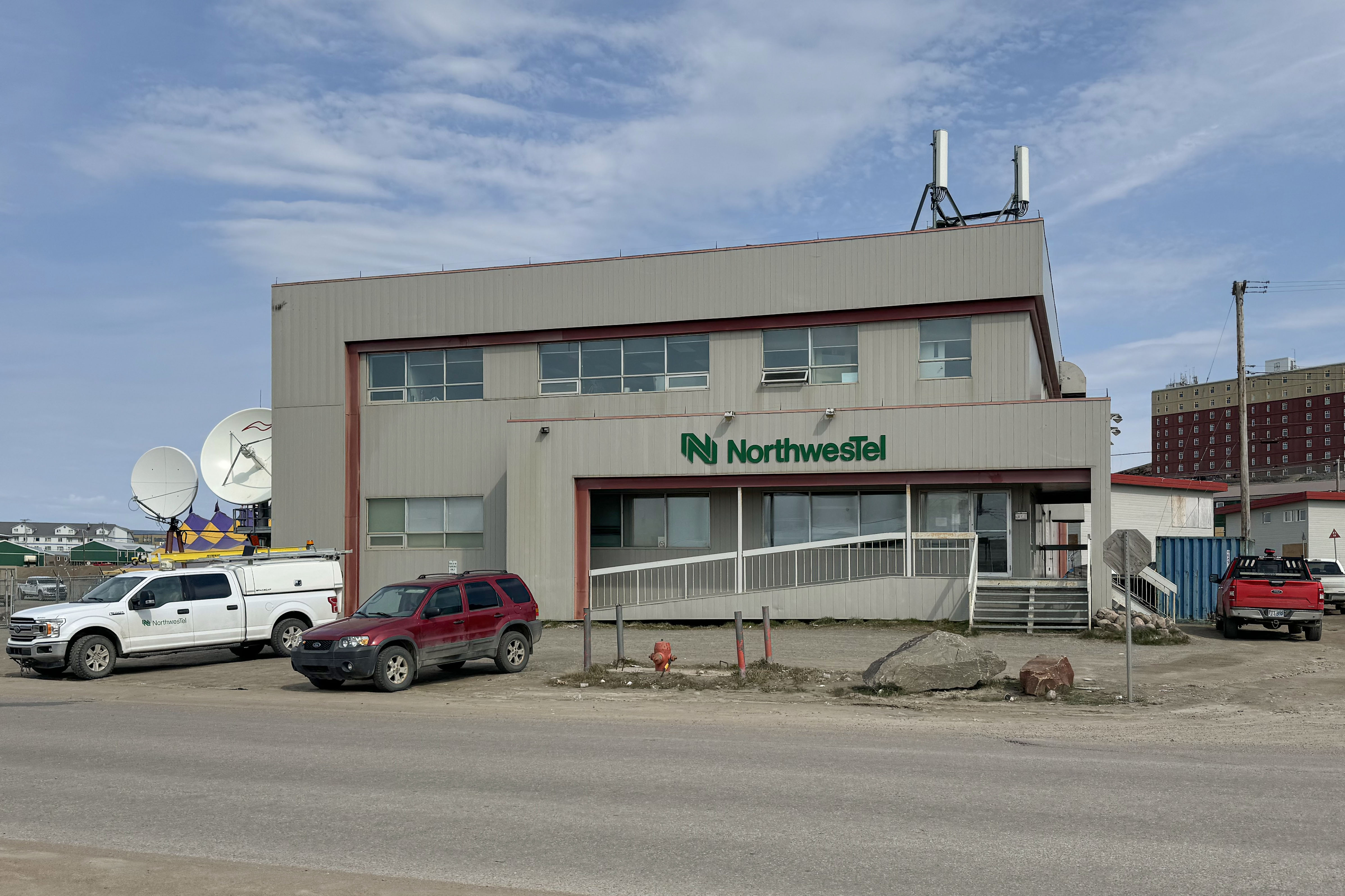
Northwestel facility in Iqaluit, Nunavut

The earliest telephone service in Northwestel's present-day operating territory was in Dawson City, established in 1899 just after the peak of the Klondike Gold Rush. However, that system was not linked into the North American phone network until the 1960s. Communications with the outside required the use of radio or radio telegraphy and did not connect with telephone lines. The independent company, Yukon Telephone Syndicate, was purchased by CN Telegraph (CNT) from Northern Light Power and Coal Company of England in 1962, and a dial telephone system was installed later in the 1960s to replace the 19th-century magneto board. Robert W. Service was one of the few Dawson residents who could afford telephone service during his residence in Dawson prior to World War I.

At least one other independent company was established in Whitehorse and was able to trace its service back to 1901. The Mayo Utilities Company was established in 1920 and provided telephone, electricity and water in Mayo and Elsa/Keno City, as well as Carmacks. It was sold in 1942, and the owner sold off the electric and water operations and joined it with the Whitehorse company to form the Yukon Telephone Company.

The Royal Canadian Corps of Signals established long-distance shortwave telegraphic communications stations in the north in 1923, prior to World War II. Their function was to enable the relay of telegraphic messages between them, as well as to and from the wired CN and CP telegraph networks in the south. From 1959 to March 1960, the stations were handed off to the federal Department of Transport. By 1972, they had become redundant to the fully-developed CNT local and long-distance telephone service, with access to the CN Telegram service via the telephone operator.

=== World War II ===
In 1943, the US Army completed the first terrestrial long-distance system in the form of a pole line along the Alaska Highway. Components that normally took months to build were assembled in weeks.

Although limited in capacity, the system after the war served as the backbone long-distance network that linked Whitehorse with the south. It provided ringdown magneto phones to highway establishments.

The US Army system was turned over on April 1, 1946, to the Royal Canadian Air Force (RCAF). In 1948, the RCAF turned it over to the federal Department of Transport (DOT), which contracted the operation to Canadian National Telegraphs (CNT).

=== Postwar development ===
Other independent companies were established in Yellowknife in 1947 and Fort Smith and Hay River in the late 1950s. All of the systems were purchased by CNT between 1961 and 1964.

The independent Yellowknife Telephone Company began to be formed in the spring of 1947 with a buy-in of $50 per share. To obtain the franchise, it had to have 100 telephones operating by December 31 at midnight, but by early December, only 15 had been connected. They rushed by putting five or six phones in some homes. The inspector attempted to call 100 numbers and received 100 answers although only a quarter functioned properly. By 1958, the Yellowknife company's service had improved, with 700 phones hooked up.

During the 1950s, one of the major shareholders in Yellowknife, Jim Mason, learned that second-hand cables were for sale from a company in Stewart, British Columbia. The owner had died and his brother, the executor, did not know much about the company and accepted an offer of $1,000 for the cables, to be shipped by the executor. The cables arrived at a desperate time long after they were expected, which allowed an upgrade of the lines. The cables turned out to be worth $35,000.

CNT had an opportunity to acquire telephone services from the Canadian government in the area of Dawson Creek, Fort St. John, British Columbia, Atlin, and a line north from Terrace, however they chose not to. On 1 July 1956, those areas, through some of which CNT later ran a microwave line, became owned by the North-west Telephone Company, which was a subsidiary of the B.C. Telephone Company.

In October 1958, CNT purchased the Whitehorse-based Yukon Telephone Company and also the DOT system (established by the US Army) outright. From there, it began to develop a complete public telephone exchange service in the Yukon.

Whitehorse converted from partial dial to full dial service on October 31, 1960. The local communities' ring-down phones were then replaced with local exchange service by using surplus central office switches that could be acquired at a relatively-low cost. The wire line facilities along the highway was changed from ring-down services to multi-party lines off dial exchanges as the communities along the line received central office switches, most of which were Ericsson Rurax switches, which were modified in the late 1970s to enable direct dialing of long-distance calls but without automatic number identification. The more remote multi-party lines were switched from wire to Exicom radios, and most of the Ruraxes were replaced in the mid-1980s with modern solid-state digital switches. However, the last Rurax remained in service in Swift River until 1987.

The three local independent companies in the Northwest Territories were connected to the CNT long-distance network by 1961 and additional locations in 1962, as CNT extended its telephone service mandate into the vast territort (by then, Bell Canada was operating in Frobisher Bay, in the east). In July 1961, CNT purchased the Hay River Telephone Company; on 31 December 1963, CNT purchased the Yellowknife Telephone Company (at $250 per share); and in May 1964, CNT purchased the exchange in Fort Smith.

| Name | Communities served | Acquired by CNT |
|---|---|---|
| Federal Department of Transport (DOT) | Alaska Highway corridor, parts of Whitehorse | October 1958 |
| Yukon Telephone Company | Whitehorse, Mayo, Carmacks | October 1958 |
| Hay River Telephone Company | Hay River | July 1961 |
| Yukon Telephone Syndicate | Dawson City | 1962 |
| Yellowknife Telephone Company | Yellowknife | 31 Dec 1963 |
| unknown | Fort Smith and adjacent areas of Alberta | May 1964 |

Around 1961, the company name was changed from Canadian National Telegraphs to Canadian National Telecommunications.

The original pole line along the Alaska Highway was overbuilt by a modern analogue microwave line which was contracted for between CNT and the US Department of Defense on 25 March 1959 and completed in 1961. Like much of the northern long-distance infrastructure, a long-term government contract was required to make the cost affordable. In this case, it was the US military's need for a reliable link to its Alaska radar stations. The CNT link joined Alascom microwave facilities with Alberta Government Telephones (now Telus) microwave facilities. Other US Department of Defense contracts with CNT resulted in tropospheric scatterwave facilities being installed to link up Distant Early Warning Line sites along a line stretching from Barrow, Alaska, to the east side of Greenland, with a scatterwave antenna in Hay River, Northwest Territories. These facilities, such as the ones between Elsa, Yukon and Arctic Red River (now Tsiigehtchic), Northwest Territories, which was completed in 1960, were also used meanwhile to carry civilian long-distance circuits until satellite facilities were implemented in the 1980s.

The microwave system on the Alaska Highway was inaugurated with a phone call from Canadian prime minister John Diefenbaker, who was visiting Whitehorse, to US President John F. Kennedy in Washington, DC. The following year, the line's worth was proven in the Cuban Missile Crisis. With the possibility of a nuclear strike by the Soviet Union, the phone company hurriedly dispatched radio technicians to each site, often on a lonely mountaintop, to be ready to restore service in case of a failure. That route was upgraded to modern digital microwave technology in the early 1990s.

Direct distance dialing (DDD) was first introduced in November 1972, just 21 years after its initial introduction in Englewood, New Jersey, and 14 years after introduction to Canada at Toronto and Montreal. It had become available on all but a handful of exchanges by the spring of 1980.

The pole line remained used until the early 1980s for multiparty line service for rural telephone customers, who are now served by point-to-point radio connections for their telephone service. The removal of the wires provoked a small rural protest from people who had hooked their radio sets to the wire to pick up Canadian Broadcasting Corporation (CBC) radio signals, which inadvertently were carried along the wires. A Northwestel spokesperson explained in a letter to the editor that it could not knowingly continue to provide a service that it was not licensed to provide.

The company's corporate headquarters were transferred from Edmonton to Whitehorse in 1980. Operations have been diversified, with Yellowknife being another prime centre for the company.

Northwestel corporate family tree

(The years in which Hay River Tel. Co., Fort Smith Tel. Co., and Performance Communications were established is not known by the contributor of this chart.)

== Modern corporate history ==
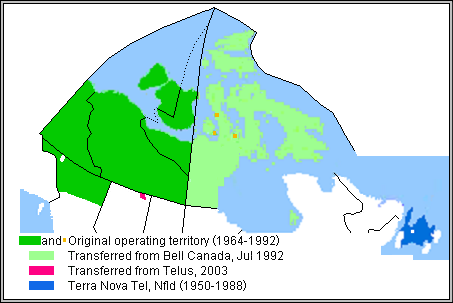
Northwestel operating area

Northwestel was established in 1979 by its owner, Canadian National Railways, spinning off the "northwest" operations of Canadian National Telecommunications (which is not to be confused with CNCP Telecommunications, a joint venture that CP Telegraphs and CN Telegraphs formed). The Newfoundland operation was, the same year, spun off as Terra Nova Tel (TNT). TNT was later purchased by NewTel Enterprises and merged with Newfoundland Telephone in late 1988.

Northwestel was sold to Bell Canada Enterprises (parent of Bell Canada) on December 1, 1988. Since then, Northwestel has become a direct subsidiary of Bell Canada, although still regulated by the Canadian Radio-television and Telecommunications Commission (CRTC) separately from Bell Canada, with its own method of regulation until 2007: rate of return. Northwestel, as of 2007, is regulated more closely like all other companies in Canada — price regulation and a split rate base — that is appropriate to the highly competitive environment in which they operate; Northwestel does not have a split rate base, however.

On December 14, 2011, by way of Telecom Regulatory Policy 2011-711, the CRTC announced that the territory of Northwestel would now be opened to local competition beginning 1 May 2012.

The company's original service territory was the entire Yukon, plus parts of northern British Columbia, and the western portion of the Northwest Territories, including the Kitikmeot communities of Pelly Bay (now Kugaaruk), Spence Bay (Taloyoak) and Gjoa Haven. On July 1, 1992, the service territory of Bell Canada in the NWT was purchased by Northwestel, bringing the entire north under a single company.

Though technically regarded as an "independent company" through the 1960s, 1970s and 1980s (it was not a member of the Trans-Canada Telephone System or Telecom Canada), the last of seven actual independent companies within Northwestel's operating area were acquired by the company's predecessor CNT in 1964.

A CRTC order in 2003 transferred a small section of Alberta, that had no telephone service, to Northwestel's operating area, as it could better serve the location from Fort Smith than could Telus due to isolation and network cost. Fort Fitzgerald residents initiated the process by appealing to the CRTC; service was installed at the end of 2005, delayed as the Regional Municipality of Wood Buffalo demanded ongoing access payments for installing the telephone lines, initially at a rate far in excess of the revenue that would be generated by a very small number of customers. The 2003 order had the effect of eliminating an anomaly - Northwestel already had some customers in Alberta adjacent to Fort Smith, though not as far from Fort Smith as Fort Fitzgerald.

In 2012 Northwestel complied with the CRTC's request for a network modernization plan, which resulted in considerable opposition from northern rival telecoms.

In February 2013, Northwestel released a revised modernization plan, which president Paul Flaherty explained to the public. But the new plan was criticized by the government of Nunavut and Northwestel's largest competitor SSi Micro.

Parallel to this, another regulatory process before the CRTC has been underway regarding the wholesale prices Northwestel is permitted to charge competitors for access to its fibre cable connecting the Northwest Territories to southern Canada.

In March 2015, the CRTC ordered Northwestel to reduce residential Internet rates in the Northwest Territories, while a final decision regarding wholesale rates is still pending.

In November 2023, Northwestel took control of telephone service in Atlin, British Columbia, following a purchase from the incumbent provider Telus. The local Taku River Tlingit First Nation had advocated for this change because of "jurisdictional issues" preventing the community from receiving Internet services from Telus. Northwestel assumed control over the Atlin telephone exchange on November 23, 2023.

In June 2024, Northwestel and Bell Canada announced that Northwestel will be sold to Sixty North Unity, a consortium of Indigenous communities from the Yukon, the Northwest Territories and Nunavut. The sale was still not finalized as of June 2025.

=== Modernization ===
CN inherited a mixture of switching technologies, some dial exchanges (Whitehorse, Yellowknife, Hay River, Fort Smith), some manual exchanges (Dawson City). Most settlements had no phone service or only one or two lines from a larger centre. Dial telephone service was ubiquitous by the end of the 1960s wherever a local exchange was established.

Microwave installations similar to the Alaska Highway route and others in southern Canada replaced outdated or overcrowded pole-line systems on routes paralleling the Yukon's Klondike Highway, and highways in the Northwest Territories, as well as a mammoth pole-line along the Mackenzie River to Inuvik that was only in service from 1968 to 1973. Satellite relays replaced Tropospheric scatterwave systems to DEW-line communities such as Cambridge Bay and Spence Bay, improving signal quality immensely.

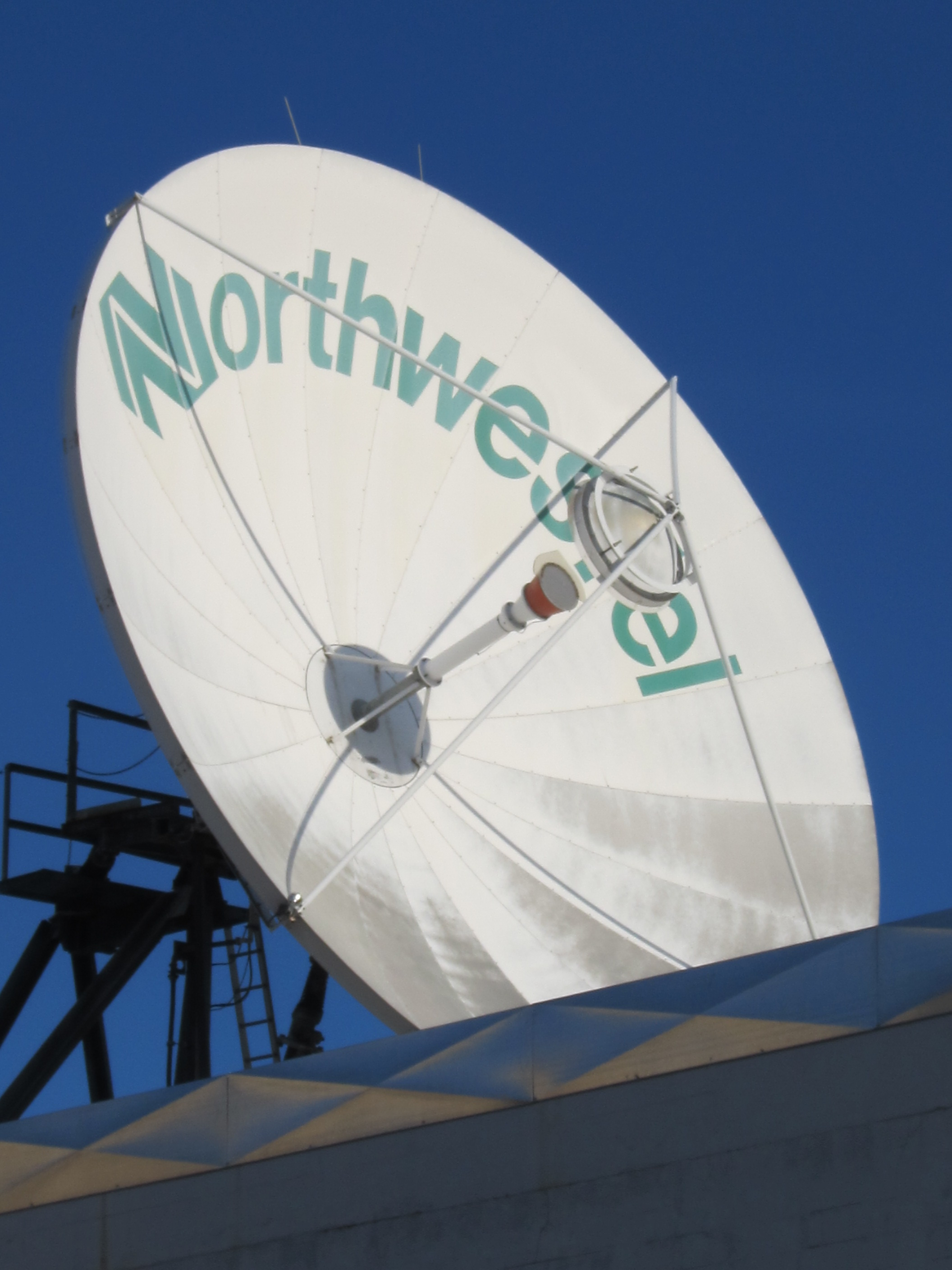
NorthwesTel satellite receive dish

Manual Mobile Telephone Service, using VHF frequencies, introduced by the Yukon Telephone Company at Whitehorse in or about 1953, was introduced by CNT/Northwestel along all major highways, the Mackenzie River valley and additional off-road regions, during the 1960-1990 period. The last manual mobile base stations were shut down 31 October 2015, at the end of a four-year phase-out.

Further improvements in the 1990s eliminated "double-hop" relays between two satellite-served communities, halving the transmission time for a satellite as much as 26,000 mi (42,000 km) away over the equator. Nevertheless, bad atmosphere conditions can still skip satellite signals out of the atmosphere for far-north points where the antenna points horizontally across the ground. (The effect is similar when looking at an oar in the water, and the oar appears bent.)

Until the 1980s, Northwestel's current operating area (including the Bell Canada area it acquired in 1992) was characterized by north–south communications and transportation links. Airlines flew mainly north–south. Highways such as the Alaska Highway and the Mackenzie Highway were routed north–south. Telecommunication lines and tropo links routed north–south, following the natural transportation corridors.

As a result, the area's low requirements were met by long-distance switching as part of southern area codes - 403 in the west and 819 in the east. The Yukon was also covered by 403, not 604, since its lines were handled, prior to Direct Distance Dialing, by operators in Edmonton, Alberta.

The northern British Columbia locations, plus Fort Liard, NT until October 1981, were served by area code 604 so that there would be uniformity of dialing codes within that province. Lower Post, BC, linked with the Watson Lake, YT exchange, was covered by 403 prior to 1979.

In 1997, the single area code 867 was introduced to replace 403 and 819, although the British Columbia locations, by now serviced by 250, remained on 250. The inauguration of 867 signaled a truly trans-northern communications network that was finally capable of routing calls across the north without having to route through the territories of southern telephone companies.

A Service Improvement Plan (SIP), similar to ones implemented by other Canadian telephone companies, extended basic levels of service to more of the north during the four years starting in 2001.

In August 2009, Northwestel completed the last leg of fibre from Whitehorse to the south. Until this time, a 320 km (200 mi) long section between Fort Nelson, BC, and Mould Creek (near Liard Hot Springs), telecommunications passing through the area were carried over microwave radio. The completion of the fibre link in this area also will allow Northwestel to provide internet service to the communities of Muncho Lake, BC and Toad River, BC. Since the completion of fibre fully to Whitehorse, internet package speeds and transfer caps in Whitehorse have both been increased significantly.

Unlike southern phone companies, Northwestel occasionally must decommission exchanges and facilities in previously active communities that are ceasing to exist. In several cases, a large investment in wiring distribution and exchange infrastructure must be abandoned or removed, and may become surplus.

Past communities served by Northwestel that have vanished include:

- Clinton Creek, Yukon (1978)
- Port Radium, Northwest Territories (1982)
- Pine Point, Northwest Territories (1988)
- Tungsten, Northwest Territories (1990)
- Bearskin Lake, BC (2004)
- Little Cornwallis Island, Nunavut (2004)
- Nanisivik, Nunavut, 19 February 2007, following a lengthy proceeding before the CRTC with opposition from contract workers at the mine site;
- Cassiar, British Columbia, is a shadow of its former self and its remaining customers have been moved, by fall 2006, to the Good Hope Lake exchange (which once was a locality of Cassiar).

Other communities have been added and then deleted in a short space of years: McDame Lake, BC; Ketza River, Yukon. Elsa survives as a rate centre only because it was eclipsed by relatively stable Keno, which is served by the same exchange.

== Subsidiary operations ==
Northwestel Cable is a wholly owned subsidiary of Northwestel. Originally approved by the CRTC to provide cable television in numerous communities across the north, the timing was poor as DTH satellite services became available; Northwestel Cable was unable to subscribe enough customers to make systems viable except in Norman Wells; the company also in 1995 purchased the Mackenzie Media cable system in Yellowknife, the Performance Communications Corp. system in Watson Lake and the Pangnirtung cable TV system. In 2005, Northwestel Cable purchased the Fort Nelson, British Columbia, system and upgraded it for digital and internet. In August 2006, the system in High Level, Alberta, was also purchased and is to be upgraded for digital cable and internet. In September 2007, Northwestel Cable took ownership of the WHTV Cablevision system in Whitehorse, and again, conducted upgrades.

Northwestel introduced a form of cellular telephony in 1987 with the Aurora (Automated Roving Radio) system (400 MHz band) developed by Novatel and widely used in Alberta. It was available in limited areas, and although intended to replace most of the VHF manual mobile telephone service, the widespread deployment of cellular service (800 MHz band) across southern Canada rendered the Aurora system obsolete, despite Aurora's superior geographic reach. The Aurora system was manufacturer discontinued, and, not being Y2K compatible, was discontinued late in 1999.

800 MHz cellular technology was introduced in 1993, though with far less availability than Aurora in the Yukon and Northwest Territories. The cellular operations were, soon after, spun off as Northwestel Mobility Inc. (NMI Mobility). In 2003, NMI Mobility was sold to Bell Mobility, leaving Northwestel as strictly landline and VHF manual mobile provider. However, it appears to have been since re-acquired by Northwestel.

Northwestel was in a joint venture with the Dakwakada Development Corporation (an arm of the Champagne and Aishihik First Nations) in Latitude Wireless, offering cellular service in parts of the Territories. Roaming was available between the Latitude and Bell Mobility networks. Latitude Wireless was merged with Bell Mobility in 2013.

== Unique service area ==
Northwestel's service area is uniquely recognized by the Canadian regulator, the CRTC, as being entirely a high-cost serving area, characterized by:

- the most severe climate (six to nine months of weather adverse for outdoor construction and maintenance, temperatures that make metal brittle, icing of towers and microwave dishes, wind damage)
- extremely low population density (long distances between communities, most of which are very small)
- the smallest communities to use expensive fixed assets such as exchanges (exchange itself, electricity, backup power, building heat and light)
- all-weather road access to only 55 of 93 communities & localities (air transport costs, overnight accommodations, risk of stranding due to weather), and
- terrestrial long-distance networks to only 48 of 93 communities & localities - the rest are served by satellite (transponder lease costs, solar activity interference, adverse angle of signals on entering the atmosphere)

As an example of the low population density, the area of Kluane National Park and Reserve in the southwest Yukon, which has an adjacent population of less than 1,100, is 22,013 km^{2} (8,499 sq mi). The Golden Horseshoe of Ontario, the area around Toronto and Hamilton, Ontario, is 31,562 km^{2} (12,186 sq mi), has some 8.1 million people; the densest portion of 22,000 km^{2} (8,500 sq mi) of the Golden Horseshoe likely has over 5 million people.

Northwestel's operating area is one third of Canada's land mass, but only 1/300th of Canada's population.

An example of extraordinary maintenance costs occurred in the late 1990s when wind blew the satellite dish at Grise Fiord off its base and wrecked it, cutting off communications for a community of just a few hundred people. A replacement dish, and installation crew, had to be sent in by air freight charter, and assembled on site. This sort of cost must be covered as "monopoly local", supported by carrier access tariff fees, or in the resale prices charged to resellers of local service.

While not necessarily a cost factor, an adverse effect of the high latitude is the refraction of radio signals by the atmosphere. At Grise Fiord, the satellite antenna faces horizontally south at the satellite which is located over the equator. The signal from the satellite strikes the atmosphere at such a flat angle that adverse conditions can deflect the signal away from the straight-line required to reach the antenna. The effect is similar to how an oar appears bent at the surface of the water.

As a result of these factors, long-distance competition arrived some nine years later than in the rest of Canada, and local competition was still not allowed through 2006. In addition, the CRTC recognized the need for external supplementary funding to sustain the company with competition, since it was viewed as essential that Northwestel remain in business to provide basic phone service to all communities it now served.

The external subsidy allows the company to offer a long-distance plan, to all communities in its operating area, with a rate of 10 cents per minute for calling within Canada during off-peak hours. Without the subsidy, this low rate could not be offered. The Carrier Access Tariff (CAT) rate was also subsidized at just 7 cents per minute from 2001 to early 2007, and a lower CAT rate would have required even greater subsidy; other Canadian companies can offer lower CAT rates without subsidization. In addition, the "toll connecting trunks" (portions of the long-distance networks that connect local exchanges to the long-distance exchanges) are unusually long, and are regarded as part of monopoly local, requiring external subsidy to sustain. Circuit charges are also priced well above cost in order to cross-subsidize non-profitable services such as monopoly local.

Considering the difficulties of the operating area, Northwestel provides a fairly modern telecommunications network, including a basic level of such features as Call waiting, dial-up Internet, Call Number Display in 58 exchanges (62 communities & localities), and, in the largest centres which are still smaller than Bell Canada's fair-sized towns, video conference services. More advanced features, such as Name Display, are not available, and long-distance transmission of Call Number Display is limited to just 14 communities. They also provide cable services, as "TheEdge", with television and DSL Internet in some communities, many of them with government assistance. As NetKaster they also provide Two-way Satellite Internet access to Alberta and parts of the NWT and Nunavut and planned expansion in British Columbia, Saskatchewan, Manitoba and Yukon.

The CRTC initiated a proceeding on January 17, 2006 (Telecom Public Notice CRTC 2006-1) to review the regulatory framework for Northwestel, with a decision for a new framework issued in 2007 to go within 60 days. The CRTC examined moving Northwestel from rate-of-return regulation to price regulation, or a transitional regime. It also examined the possibility of local service competition (and under what conditions), possible split of rate base between competitive and utility, further SIP proposals, and status of long-distance competition and the setting of the CAT rate.

The strongest opposition to the proposal by Northwestel came from Telus. The proposal envisioned a substantial increase in supplemental funding in order to shift from an implicit subsidy (circuit charges far above cost) to an explicit subsidy (charges closer to parity with elsewhere in Canada); there would also have been a major cut in the 7 cent-per-minute CAT rate to a new switch connect rate lower than one cent per minute, again replacing an implicit subsidy with an explicit subsidy through supplemental funding. Consumer groups expressed concern about the price-cap regime, suggesting continued regulation. Various groups expressed concern about the unknown long-distance rate reductions, as for competitive reasons, neither Northwestel nor the CRTC could disclose the specifics.

The CRTC issued its decision (Telecom Decision 2007-5) on February 2, 2007, following an interim order issued on December 6, 2006, that allowed the first raise in basic network service rates since 2001 (residence customers face an increase of $2.00, equal to 1.11 percent per year over six years). The approved switch connect rate will be $0.0415 per minute per end; local service resale was approved; Toll Free remains regulated; other toll services will now be excluded from regulation; a new SIP program to replace outdated and Industry Canada-non compliant transmission networks was not approved.

The company announced its new long-distance plans on 21 March 2007, after adjusting its original plans to reflect the CRTC-approved rates and regime. The timing of the CRTC decision conflicted with the company's temporary loss of staff for volunteer activity at the Canada Winter Games.

Further CRTC proceedings in late 2011 opened the Northwestel service area to facilities-based local service competition, with limited availability of number portability. There was a small reduction in the switch connect rate which remains the highest in Canada. Again, a further service improvement plan, including replacing a radio-based line service in Upper Halfway River, B.C., and non-compliant microwave radio systems, was rejected by the CRTC. CLECs may offer service as from 1 May 2012; one hopeful competitor, SSi Micro, was seeking CRTC remedies for rates for data transport while other potential competitors began preparing for to enter the northern market.

On May 28, 2012, it was announced that Iristel, one of Canada's largest Voice over IP networks (VoIP), would be the first CLEC to enter the Yukon, Northwest Territories and Nunavut through a partnership with ICE Wireless. Samer Bishay, president of both Ice Wireless and Iristel, considered it to be the official end of Northwestel's long standing monopoly in northern Canada.

== See also ==
- List of Canadian telephone companies
- Wonders, William C. (1971). Canada's Changing North. McClelland and Stewart. p. 298–299. ISBN 0-7735-2640-4
