= Improvement plan =

Improvement plan may refer to:

- Performance improvement planning
- Service Improvement Plan, a program to provide a basic telephone service to most Canadians
- Capital improvement plan
- Process improvement plan in Six Sigma
