= List of postal codes of Canada: Y =

This is a list of postal codes in Canada where the first letter is Y. Postal codes beginning with Y are located within the Canadian territory of Yukon. Only the first three characters are listed, corresponding to the Forward Sortation Area (FSA).

Canada Post provides a free postal code look-up tool on its website, via its mobile apps for such smartphones as the iPhone and BlackBerry, and sells hard-copy directories and CD-ROMs. Many vendors also sell validation tools, which allow customers to properly match addresses and postal codes. Hard-copy directories can also be consulted in all post offices, and some libraries.

== Yukon ==
There are currently 3 FSAs in this list.

=== Urban ===
Y1A; Whitehorse	Y1B; Not assigned	Y1C; Not assigned	Y1E; Not assigned	Y1G; Not assigned
Y1H; Not assigned	Y1J; Not assigned	Y1K; Not assigned	Y1L; Not assigned	Y1M; Not assigned
Y1N; Not assigned	Y1P; Not assigned	Y1R; Not assigned	Y1S; Not assigned	Y1T; Not assigned
Y1V; Not assigned	Y1W; Not assigned	Y1X; Not assigned	Y1Y; Not assigned	Y1Z; Not assigned

=== Rural ===
Y0A
Southeastern Yukon

1B0: Teslin
1C0: Watson Lake

Y0B
Central Yukon

1A0: Beaver Creek
1B0: Carcross
1C0: Carmacks
1G0: Dawson
1H0: Destruction Bay
1J0: Elsa
1K0: Faro
1L0: Haines Junction
1M0: Mayo
1N0: Old Crow
1P0: Pelly Crossing
1S0: Ross River
1T0: Tagish
1V0: Burwash Landing
1Y0: Marsh Lake

== Forward Sortation Areas by population ==
1. Y1A, 31,094
2. Y0B, 7,481
3. Y0A, 1,657

|}
