= Skagway–Fraser Border Crossing =

Border crossing between Canada and the United States

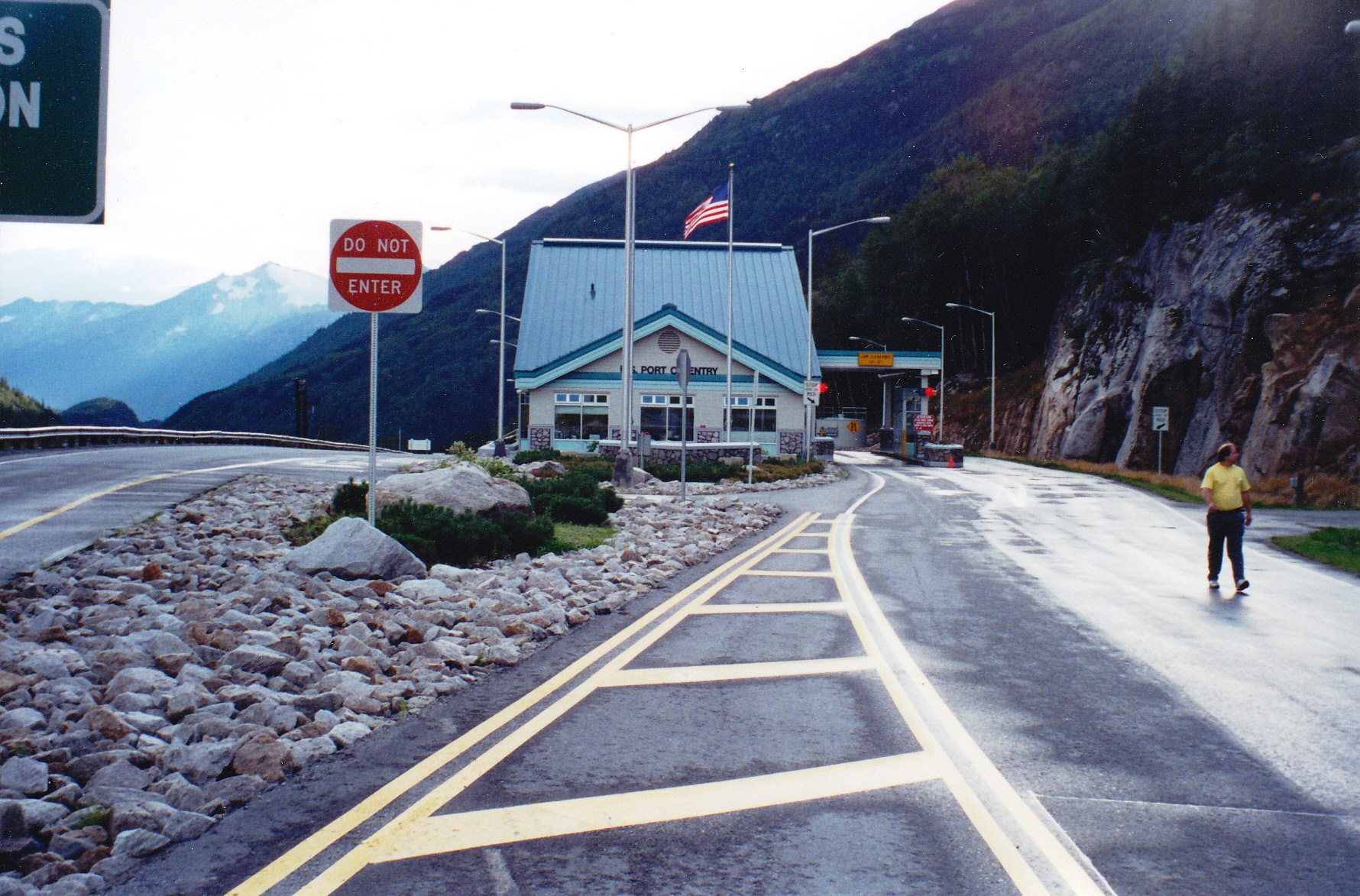
- The US Border Inspection Station at Skagway, Alaska

Locaiton
- Country: United States; Canada
- Location: AK-98 / Hwy 2 / Klondike Highway; US Port: Milepost 6.8, Klondike Hwy., Skagway, AK 99840; Canadian Port: Km 36.5/Mile 22.6 Yukon Highway 2, Fraser, BC
- Coordinates: 59°37′47″N 135°09′52″W

Details
- Opened: 1979

Website
- US Canadian

The Skagway–Fraser Border Crossing connects the communities of Skagway, Alaska and Carcross, Yukon on the Canada–United States border. Alaska Highway 98 on the American side joins Yukon Highway 2 on the Canadian side. The border is near the summit of White Pass on the Klondike Highway, where the elevation is 3,292 feet (1,003 m). The border divides Alaska Time Zone from Pacific Time Zone. The highway, completed in 1979, was initially seasonal, but has been open year-round since 1986.

== Canadian side ==
For a few months in 1898 during the Klondike Gold Rush, while discussions continued on the Alaska boundary dispute, a North-West Mounted Police (NWMP) detachment and a customs office (collecting duty on goods destined for the Yukon) operated at Skagway. Subsequently, other border stations existed on the BC side. Bennett operated 1899–1901. Log Cabin, about 7 kilometres (4 mi) northeast of Fraser, existed 1901–1905. The White Pass customs office, which opened in 1898, was upgraded to an outport in 1907.

The White Pass and Yukon Route, completed in 1900, included train stations at White Pass, Fraser and Bennett. When the White Pass train station, which housed the customs office, burned to the ground in 1950, customs moved to temporary accommodation before closing the following year. This section of the line closed in 1982, unable to compete with the highway but reopened to Fraser in 1988. The line reopened to Bennett in 1992 and Carcross in 1997.

The Canada Border Services Agency (CBSA) facility, which operates at Fraser, 12.2 kilometres (7.6 mi) northeast of the border (59°42′54″N 135°02′47″W), primarily handles highway traffic, but also processes train passengers.

== US side ==
To address a US Customs refusal to allow Canadian vessels to discharge freight and passengers at Skagway, the two governments held discussions. From 1897, US Customs allowed freight to be transported under bond before entering BC.

The US Border Inspection Station lies 7.9 miles (12.7 km) south of the border at 59°31′38″N 135°13′47″W. The farthest offset from the border of any US land border station, this is the busiest Canada–Alaska crossing.

== See also ==
- List of Canada–United States border crossings
