= Stewart Crossing =

Settlement in Yukon, Canada

Coordinates: 63°22′28″N 136°40′38″W

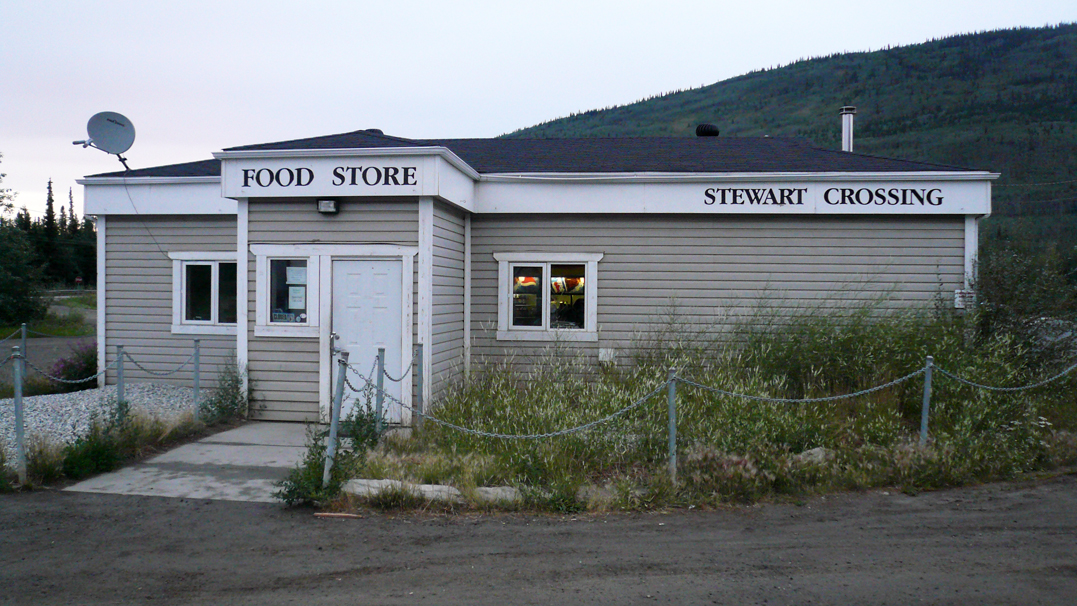
Stewart Crossing gas station store

Stewart Crossing is a settlement in Yukon, Canada located on the Stewart River. It is about 179 km east of Dawson City on the Klondike Highway, near the junction with the Silver Trail, from which it is about 53 km (33 mi) southwest of Mayo. A Yukon government highway maintenance camp and a highway lodge are the most prominent facilities at Stewart Crossing. The settlement is named for where the Klondike Highway (or Mayo Road, as it was then known), crossed the Stewart River by means of a ferry from 1950 until completion of a bridge in the mid-1950s.

== Geography ==
=== Climate ===
Climate data for Stewart Crossing
Month	Jan	Feb	Mar	Apr	May	Jun	Jul	Aug	Sep	Oct	Nov	Dec	Year
Record high °C (°F)	10.0 (50.0)	12.0 (53.6)	13.0 (55.4)	23.5 (74.3)	32.0 (89.6)	34.0 (93.2)	33.0 (91.4)	32.0 (89.6)	26.1 (79.0)	22.0 (71.6)	12.0 (53.6)	11.0 (51.8)	34.0 (93.2)
Mean daily maximum °C (°F)	−23.5 (−10.3)	−13.7 (7.3)	−2.8 (27.0)	10.0 (50.0)	—	22.5 (72.5)	—	20.6 (69.1)	13.1 (55.6)	−0.3 (31.5)	−16.7 (1.9)	−12.9 (8.8)	−0.4 (31.3)
Daily mean °C (°F)	−27.8 (−18.0)	−19.9 (−3.8)	−10.9 (12.4)	1.5 (34.7)	—	14.6 (58.3)	—	13.4 (56.1)	7.0 (44.6)	−5.0 (23.0)	−21.3 (−6.3)	−19.2 (−2.6)	−6.8 (19.8)
Mean daily minimum °C (°F)	−31.2 (−24.2)	−26.1 (−15.0)	−18.4 (−1.1)	−7.0 (19.4)	—	6.8 (44.2)	—	6.0 (42.8)	1.0 (33.8)	−10.0 (14.0)	−24.8 (−12.6)	−25.2 (−13.4)	−12.9 (8.8)
Record low °C (°F)	−55.0 (−67.0)	−52.0 (−61.6)	−46.0 (−50.8)	−34.0 (−29.2)	−12.0 (10.4)	−3.5 (25.7)	−0.6 (30.9)	−6.0 (21.2)	−22.0 (−7.6)	−35.0 (−31.0)	−48.5 (−55.3)	−55.5 (−67.9)	−55.5 (−67.9)
Average precipitation mm (inches)	23.3 (0.92)	13.7 (0.54)	10.4 (0.41)	8.3 (0.33)	27.6 (1.09)	39.4 (1.55)	54.2 (2.13)	46.0 (1.81)	35.7 (1.41)	24.3 (0.96)	28.1 (1.11)	25.7 (1.01)	336.5 (13.25)
Average rainfall mm (inches)	0.0 (0.0)	0.0 (0.0)	0.1 (0.00)	2.2 (0.09)	27.4 (1.08)	39.4 (1.55)	54.2 (2.13)	45.7 (1.80)	34.2 (1.35)	9.8 (0.39)	0.3 (0.01)	0.0 (0.0)	213.3 (8.40)
Average snowfall cm (inches)	23.2 (9.1)	13.7 (5.4)	10.3 (4.1)	6.1 (2.4)	0.2 (0.1)	0.0 (0.0)	0.0 (0.0)	0.4 (0.2)	1.5 (0.6)	14.5 (5.7)	27.8 (10.9)	25.7 (10.1)	123.2 (48.5)
Average precipitation days (≥ 0.2 mm)	6.6	4.9	3.4	2.9	7.9	9.8	12.4	9.8	9.5	8.6	8.0	7.6	91.2
Average rainy days (≥ 0.2 mm)	0.0	0.0	0.1	0.8	7.8	9.8	12.4	9.8	8.9	3.0	0.1	0.0	52.6
Average snowy days (≥ 0.2 cm)	6.6	4.9	3.4	2.0	0.1	0.0	0.0	0.1	0.6	5.8	7.9	7.6	38.8
Source: Environment Canada Canadian Climate Normals 1981–2010

== Demographics ==
Federal census population history of Stewart Crossing
Year	Pop.	±%
1981	20	—
1986	40	+100.0%
1991	42	+5.0%
1996	42	+0.0%
2001	40	−4.8%
2006	35	−12.5%
2011	25	−28.6%
2016	17	−32.0%
2021	10	−41.2%
Source: Statistics Canada

In the 2021 Census of Population conducted by Statistics Canada, Stewart Crossing had a population of 10 living in 5 of its 20 total private dwellings, a change of -41.2% from its 2016 population of 17. With a land area of 28.68 km^{2} (11.07 sq mi), it had a population density of 0.3/km^{2} (0.9/sq mi) in 2021.
