= Klondike Highway =

Highway in Skagway, Alaska, United States and Yukon Territory, Canada

Klondike Highway
- Alaska Route 98; Yukon Highway 2
- Klondike Highway highlighted in red

Route information
- Maintained by Alaska DOT&PF and Yukon DOH&PW
- Length: 440.2 mi (708.4 km) AK-98: 14.4 mi (23.2 km); YT-2: 685.4 km (425.9 mi)
- Component highways: Alaska Route 98 in Alaska and Yukon Highway 2 in both British Columbia and Yukon

Major junctions
- South end: Broadway in Skagway, AK
- Hwy 8 in Carcross, YT; Hwy 1 in Carcross Cutoff, YT and Whitehorse, YT; Hwy 4 in Carmacks, YT; Hwy 11 in Stewart Crossing, YT; Hwy 5 in near Dawson City, YT
- North end: To Hwy 9 at the Dawson City Ferry Landing in Dawson City, YT

Location
- Countries: Canada, United States
- States: Alaska
- Territories: Yukon

Highway system
- Alaska Routes; Interstate; Scenic Byways
- Territorial highways in Yukon; Miscellaneous
← US 97	AK 98	→ AK-1
← Hwy 1	YT 2	→ Hwy 3

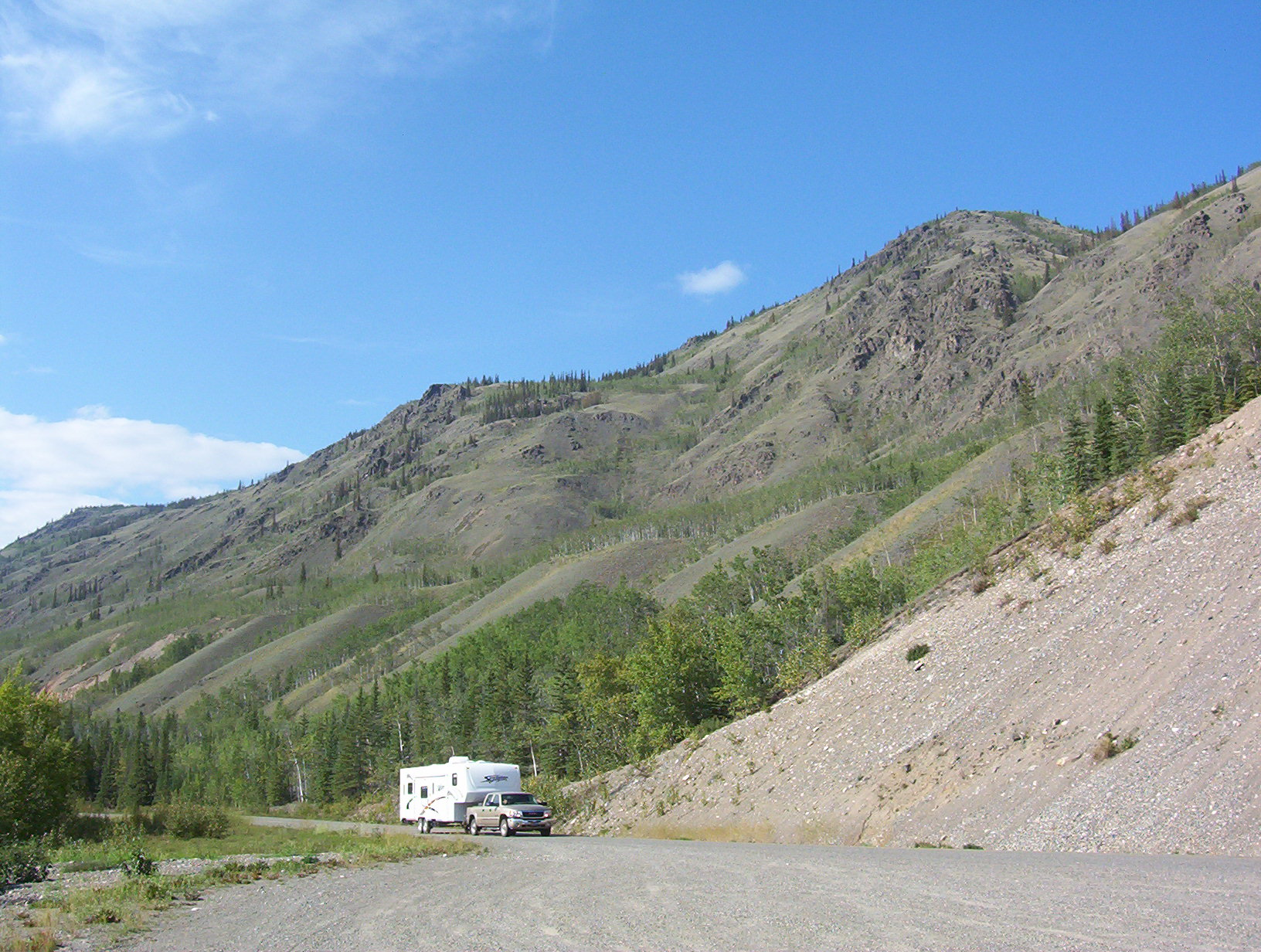
Klondike Highway near Five Finger Rapids (Yukon River)

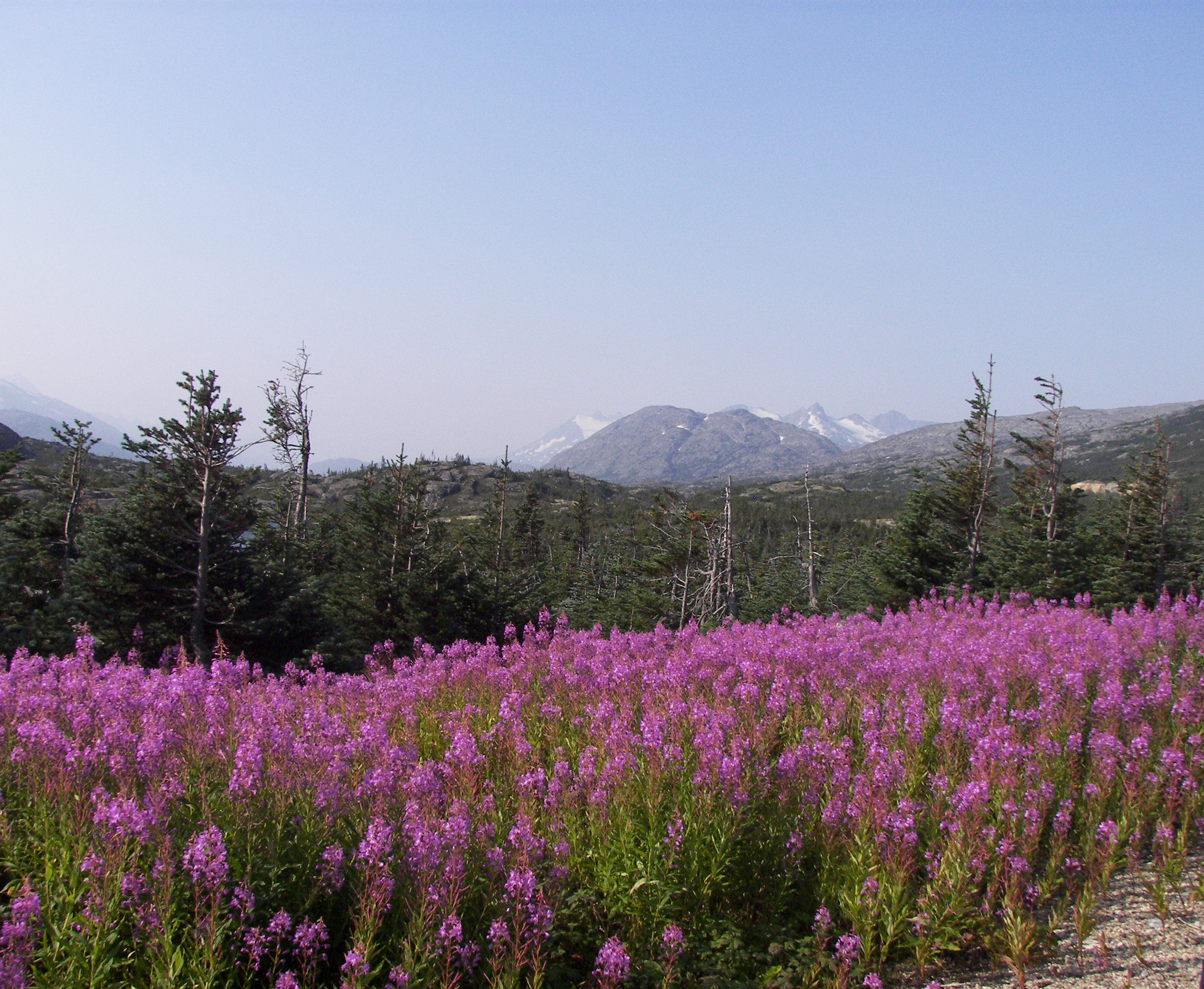
Fireweed is prominent in various locations on the Klondike Highway (this is in the vicinity of Summit Lake and Bernard Lake in British Columbia).

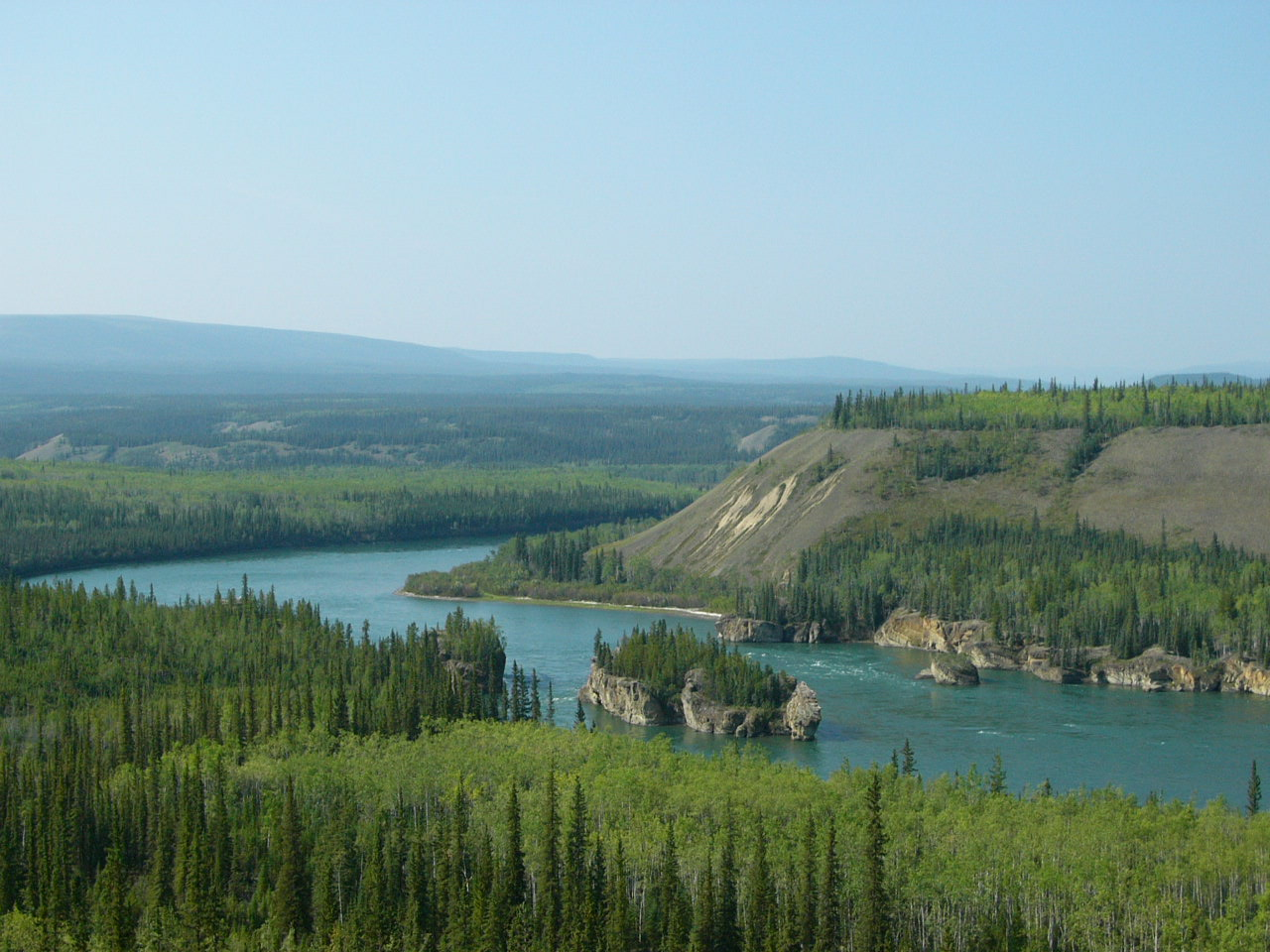
Five Finger Rapids seen from Klondike Highway

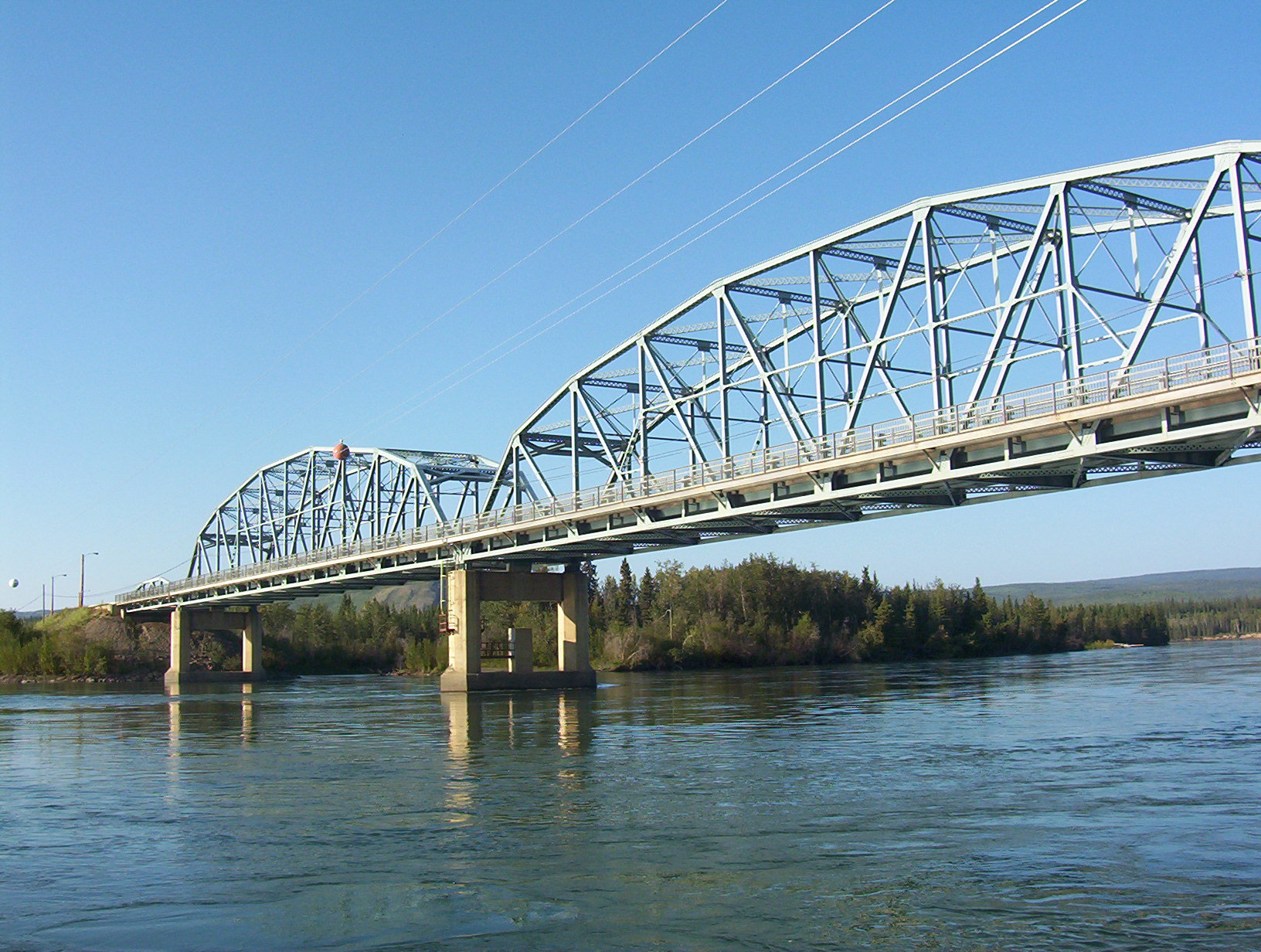
The bridge across the Yukon River at Carmacks

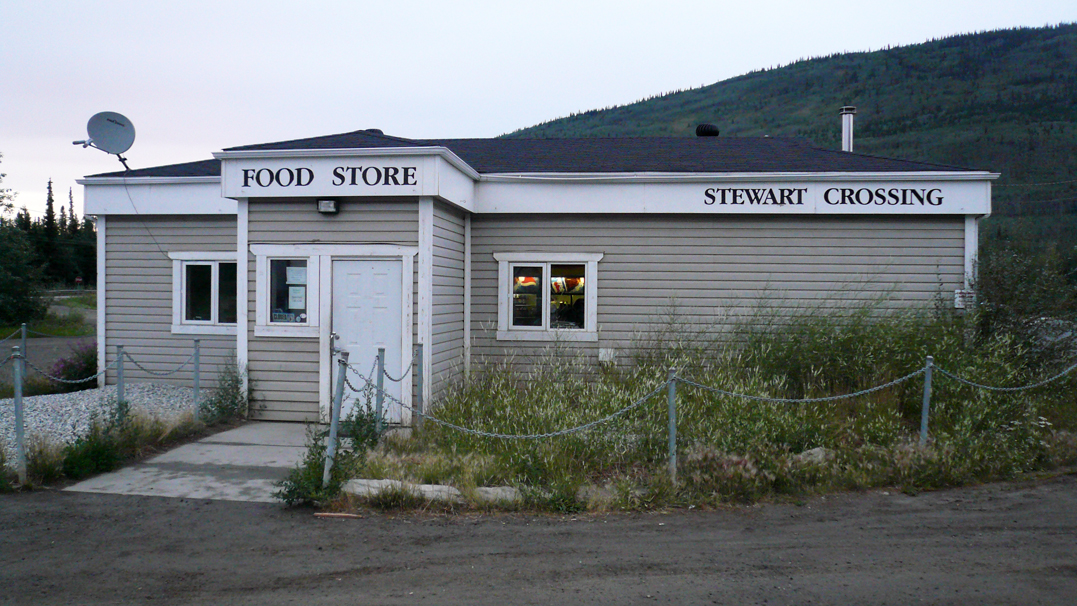
Store at the service station in Stewart Crossing

The Klondike Highway is a highway that runs from the Alaska Panhandle through the province of British Columbia and the territory of Yukon in Canada, linking the coastal town of Skagway, Alaska, to Dawson City, Yukon. Its route somewhat parallels the route used by prospectors in the 1898 Klondike Gold Rush.

In both British Columbia and Yukon, the highway is marked as Yukon Highway 2. In Alaska, the Highway is marked as Alaska Route 98 (as in "route of 1898"). Until 1978, the unopened section between the Yukon–BC border and Carcross had no official highway number, while the section north of Carcross to the Alaska Highway was Highway 5, and the section from Stewart Crossing to Dawson was Highway 3. The BC section is now maintained by the Yukon government as a natural extension of Highway 2.

== Route description ==
The Klondike Highway begins in Skagway, Alaska. It travels in the state of Alaska for 24 km (15 miles), up through the White Pass in the Coast Mountains where it crosses the Canada–US border to British Columbia (BC). It remains in the province for 56 km (35 miles), then enters Yukon where it reaches the Alaska Highway near Whitehorse, and shares a short section with that highway until north of Whitehorse, where it diverges once more to Dawson City. The highway is 709 km (441 miles) long.

== History ==
=== South Klondike Highway ===
The original 53 km (33 mi) section known locally as the Carcross Road was actually made into a part of the Alaska Highway in 1942, until the Marsh Lake route was opened the next year. As Yukon Highway 5, it formed a loop road with Highway 6, the Tagish Road (now numbered as 8). It was renumbered as Highway 2 in 1978, being incorporated into the Klondike Highway designation. The road underwent alignment improvements during the 1980s. Residents living as far south as 25 km (16 miles) from the Alaska Highway still give their residential addresses as historic mile measurements that start at zero at the Alaska Highway, even though the distances are no longer accurate, and kilometre posts count distance from Skagway's ferry terminal.

Construction of the "Carcross-Skagway Road" began in the 1950s, was abandoned partway up a mountain from Skagway, and resumed in 1976-1977 when the Captain William Moore Bridge was constructed. The entire road was completed between Skagway and Carcross in August 1978. It was only open for a few weeks before seasonal closure. The first full summer season of use was in 1979.

The highway originally was built for tourist traffic, but in 1986 became important as a commercial transportation route, coincident with what seemed to be inevitable abandonment of the White Pass and Yukon Route railway (WP&YR). The new owners of the Faro mine secured government agreement to open the highway for trucking. The last winter closure ended in the spring of 1986.

The Carcross-Skagway Road portion of the highway underwent substantial rerouting, widening and (cold mix) paving in the late 1980s and early 1990s. Mining ore trucks and fuel tankers are the primary current (2013) commercial users of the highway, which also remains a popular tourist route (cars, RVs, buses), and provides a means for the WP&YR to offer economically-priced train excursions connecting at Fraser to buses based at Skagway for the cruise ship industry, or to/from Carcross and Whitehorse to the north.

=== North Klondike Highway ===
The quality of roads from Whitehorse to Dawson City prior to 1950 was poor and only for the hardiest of travelers and motorized vehicles. The "Whitehorse-Mayo Road," Yukon's original Highway 2, extended along today's route from Whitehorse to Stewart Crossing, then turned northeast to Mayo, Elsa and Keno City. The last of three bridges was finished in 1960 to replace ferries at Carmacks, Pelly Crossing and Stewart Crossing.

Yukon's original Highway 3, the Dawson-Mayo Road, was opened in September 1955 between Stewart Crossing and Dawson City. The Dawson-Mayo Road became part of Highway 2 in 1978 and was named the Klondike Highway, while the road northeast from Stewart Crossing became Highway 11, and was later named the Silver Trail.

Even as of 1979, the entire Klondike Highway was gravel, but by 1982, some paving had been laid down as far north as Carmacks. Rebuilding and some rerouting was completed in the late 1980s.

Approximately, the first 30 km (19 mi) of the North Klondike Highway are still often known as the Mayo Road to the residents of Whitehorse. Although kilometric distance markers have been in place since the early 1980s, residents in this area still identify their residential address as a mile measurement along the Mayo Road.

== Major intersections ==
State / Province / Territory	Region / Municipality	Location	km	mi	Destinations	Notes
Alaska	City of Skagway		0.0	0.0	First Street – Skagway Ferry Terminal	Alaska Marine Highway; AK-98 southern terminus
Skagway–Fraser Border Crossing			23.1	14.4	Canada–United States border Northern terminus of AK-98; Southern terminus of Hwy 2	
White Pass – 874 m (2,867 ft)			23.1	14.4		
British Columbia	No major junctions					
			79.8	49.6	British Columbia–Yukon border	
Yukon	Unorganized	Carcross	106.0	65.9	Hwy 8 east (Tagish Road) – Tagish, Alaska Highway, Atlin	
Yukon	Unorganized	Carcross Cutoff	157.2	97.7	Hwy 1 east (Alaska Highway) – Teslin, Watson Lake	South end of Hwy 1 (Alaska Highway) concurrency
Yukon	Unorganized	Whitehorse	172.0	106.9	Robert Service Way (South Access Road)	
Yukon	Unorganized	Whitehorse	177.8	110.5	Hamilton Boulevard, Two Mile Hill Road	
Yukon	Unorganized	Whitehorse	189.5	117.7	Hwy 1 west (Alaska Highway) – Haines Junction	North end of Hwy 1 (Alaska Highway) concurrency
Yukon	Unorganized	Carmacks	355.4	220.8	Hwy 4 east (Robert Campbell Highway) – Faro, Ross River	
Yukon	Unorganized	Stewart Crossing	534.0	331.8	Hwy 11 east (Silver Trail) – Mayo, Keno City	
Yukon	Unorganized		667.7	414.9	Hwy 5 north (Dempster Highway) – Fort McPherson, Inuvik	
Yukon	Unorganized	Dawson City	708.5	440.2	To Hwy 9 (Top of the World Highway) / Dawson City Ferry Terminal	Ferry across the Yukon River to Hwy 9; Hwy 2 northern terminus
1.000 mi = 1.609 km; 1.000 km = 0.621 mi: Concurrency terminus; Route transition

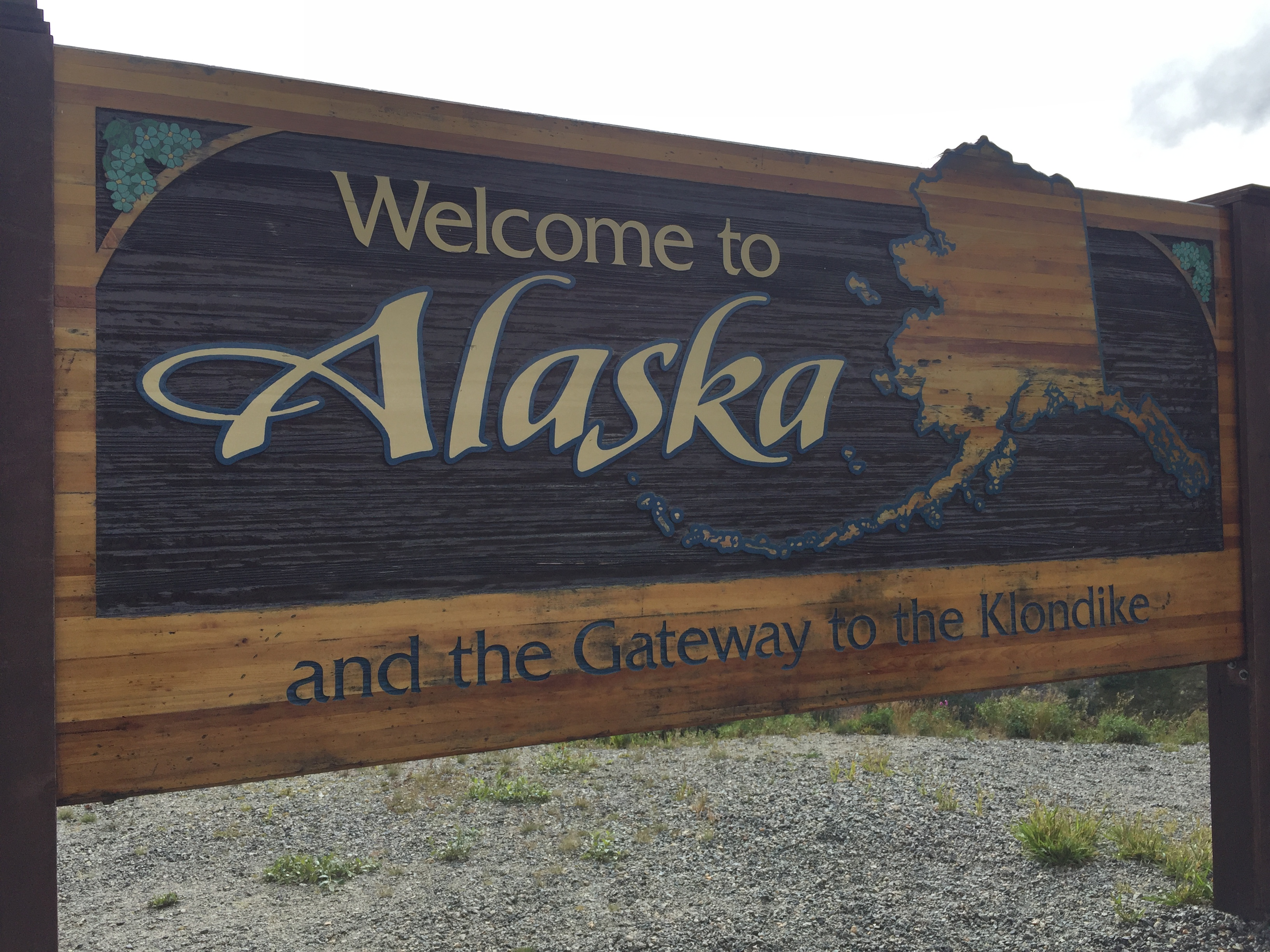
Alaska welcomes you sign

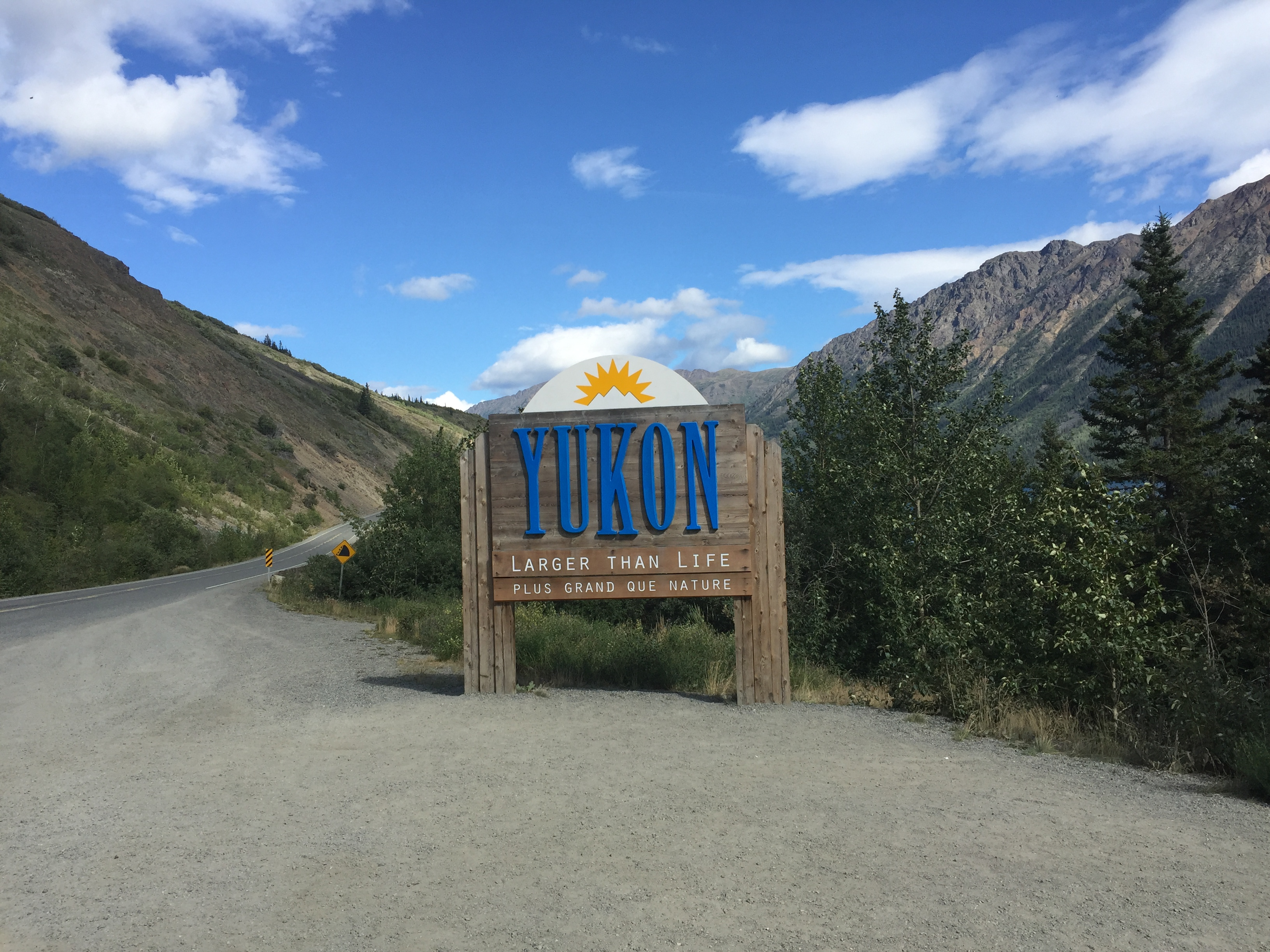
Yukon larger than life sign

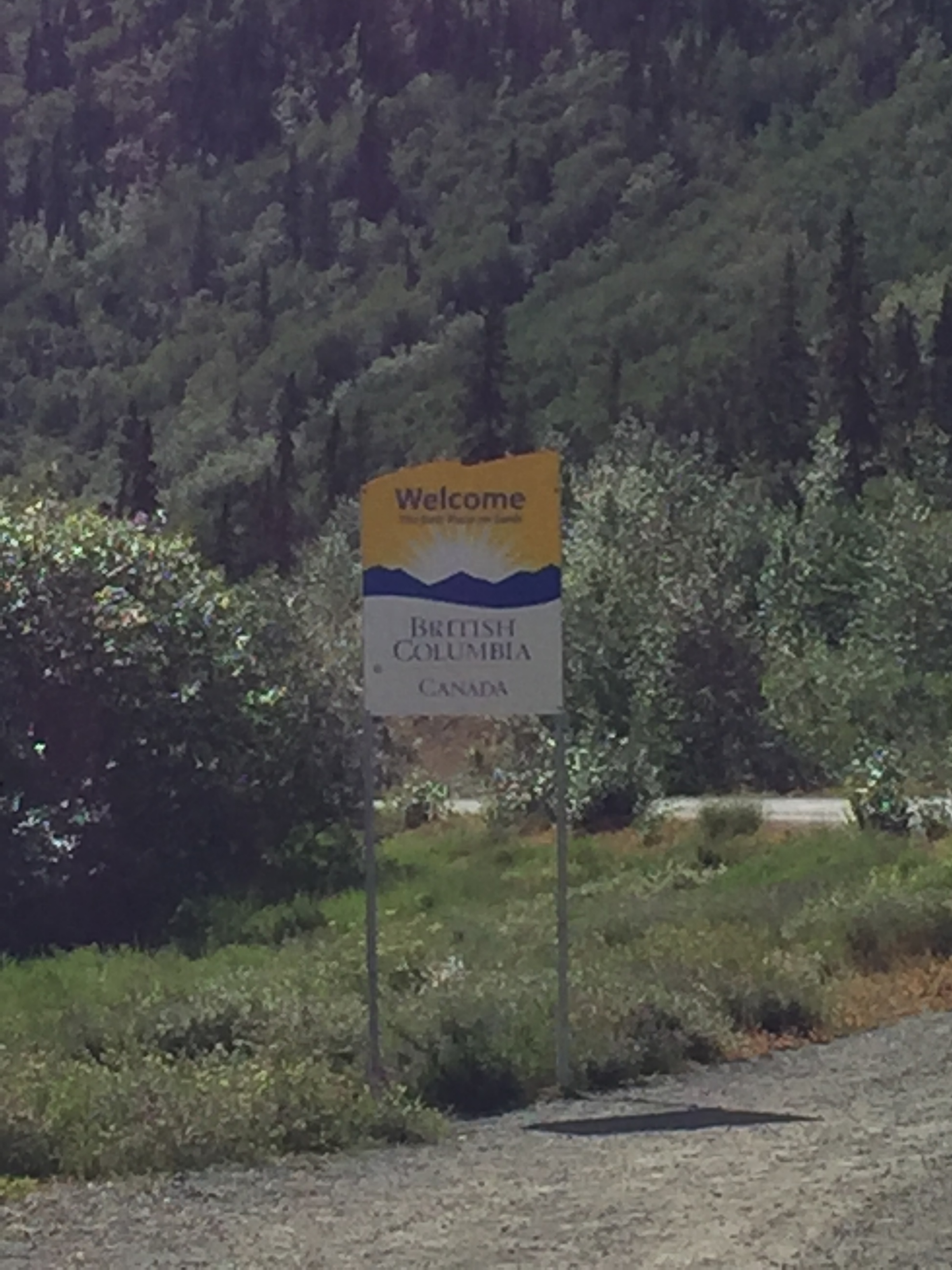
British Columbia sign along Klondike Highway

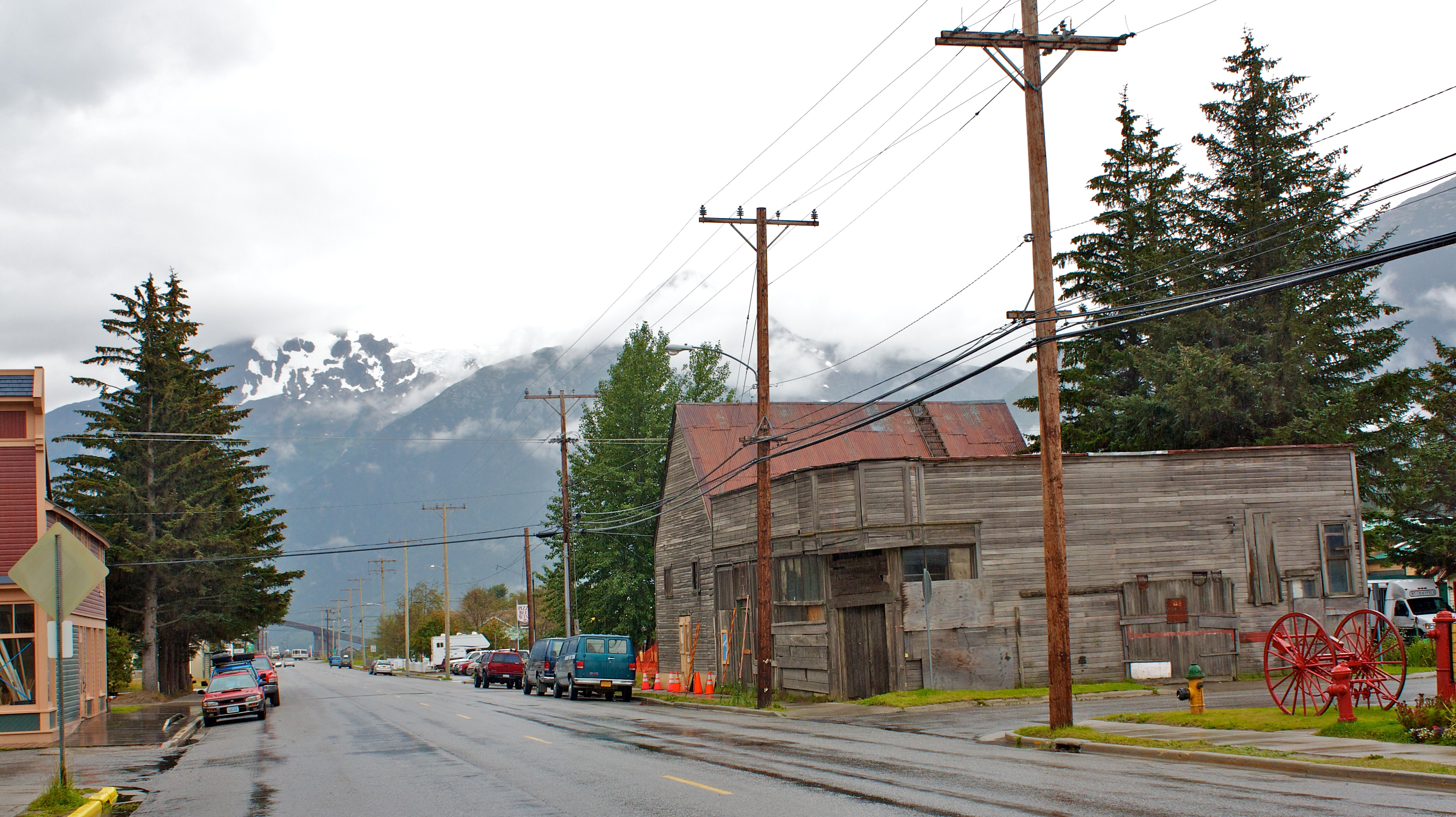
State Street at 5th Avenue in Skagway, showing the highway's southernmost portion

== See also ==
- List of Alaska Routes
- List of British Columbia provincial highways
- List of Yukon territorial highways
- Overland Trail (Yukon)
- Skagway - Fraser Border Crossing

== Sources ==
- Internet travelog of Jim Teresco. Specifically Skagway, June 23, 2001, pictures 11 and 12 and their associated captions. Retrieved 2005-02-18.
