= Service Improvement Plan =

Canadian telecommunications service improvement program

The Service Improvement Plan (SIP) was a regulatory program established by the Canadian Radio-television and Telecommunications Commission (CRTC) in the late 1990s and implemented during the 2000s to improve access to basic telephone service in high-cost and underserved areas of Canada. The program required incumbent local exchange carriers (ILECs) to submit plans for bringing customers in their serving territories up to the CRTC's basic service objective and extending service to previously unserved customers.

== Background ==
The origins of the SIP process can be traced to proceedings concerning competition and the cost of providing telephone service in northern Canada. In 1996, Call-Net's Sprint Canada applied to the CRTC for an order requiring Northwestel to provide interconnection for long-distance service. The CRTC denied the application in February 1997 but subsequently initiated a proceeding concerning long-distance competition in Northwestel's operating territory.

The CRTC issued Public Notice 97-42, Service to High Cost Serving Areas, in 1997. The proceeding examined the definition of basic telephone service and the characteristics of high-cost serving areas.

During 1998, the CRTC held regional consultations in communities across Canada, including Whitehorse, Yukon, and Deer Lake, Newfoundland and Labrador. The consultations considered the quality, availability and affordability of basic telephone service in rural and remote areas.

On 19 October 1999, the CRTC issued Telecom Decision 99-16, which established a national basic service objective. Among other requirements, the objective included reliable local telephone service, access to long-distance service, access to local dial-up Internet access where available, and enhanced calling features.

The CRTC also determined that Northwestel's operating territory constituted a high-cost serving area and concluded that supplementary funding could be required to improve and maintain service in such areas.

== Service Improvement Plans ==
Following Decision 99-16, the CRTC required the major incumbent local exchange carriers serving high-cost areas to file Service Improvement Plans. The plans were intended both to upgrade existing facilities and to extend service to customers who did not have access to the basic service objective.

Companies subject to SIP requirements included Northwestel, Bell Canada, TELUS, Manitoba Telecom Services, SaskTel, Aliant and Télébec. Each company developed a plan reflecting the conditions and telecommunications infrastructure of its own operating territory.

The projects varied by region but generally included replacement or modernization of central-office equipment, improvement of long-distance transmission facilities, conversion of outdated radio telephone systems, extension of wireline service and installation of fixed wireless facilities where conventional wireline service was impractical.

Customers receiving service improvements were generally required to contribute toward the cost of extending service to their premises. The applicable contribution depended on the circumstances and the costs established in the individual company's SIP and subsequent CRTC decisions.

== Northwestel ==
Northwestel was required to file its SIP earlier than the other major ILECs, reflecting the CRTC's determination that its entire operating territory constituted a high-cost serving area.

The Northwestel plan covered the company's territory in northern British Columbia, Yukon, the Northwest Territories and Nunavut. The plan included modernization of switching and transmission equipment, improvements to long-distance routes and extension of telephone service to previously unserved customers.

Many of the facilities targeted for replacement were based on equipment that was obsolete or no longer supported by manufacturers but remained operational. In remote communities, the low number of customers and limited economic activity often made replacement difficult to justify through ordinary commercial investment.

The original Northwestel proposal was subsequently modified by the CRTC. Among the issues considered during the regulatory process were local Internet access and Caller ID. The CRTC initially excluded some proposed expenditures where the costs were considered disproportionate to the benefits of providing the additional service.

In 2003, following a further review, the CRTC authorized Northwestel to provide local Internet access in small communities where other Internet service providers had not established local access.

=== Remote customer connections ===
A major component of the Northwestel SIP involved extending service to isolated customers and communities. Some customers previously relied on manual radio telephone systems, party lines or other forms of wireless service because conventional telephone facilities were unavailable.

Where technically feasible, the program extended wireline facilities to these areas. Existing customers with inadequate or obsolete facilities were subsequently upgraded, while customers in locations where wireline construction was impractical could be served using fixed radio systems.

The program also improved long-distance transmission routes and replaced obsolete equipment in exchanges. These projects were implemented over several years rather than simultaneously across the company's entire operating territory.

== Legacy ==
The SIP represented a significant stage in the CRTC's approach to maintaining a defined level of basic telecommunications service in Canada's rural and remote communities. It combined regulatory requirements with targeted funding and customer contributions to address facilities that could not be economically upgraded through ordinary commercial investment.

The program also established a regulatory framework for identifying high-cost serving areas and determining the costs associated with bringing customers in those areas up to the CRTC's basic service objective.
