= Five Finger Rapids =

Rapids on the Yukon River, Yukon, Canada

Coordinates: 62°16′10.84″N 136°21′1.65″W

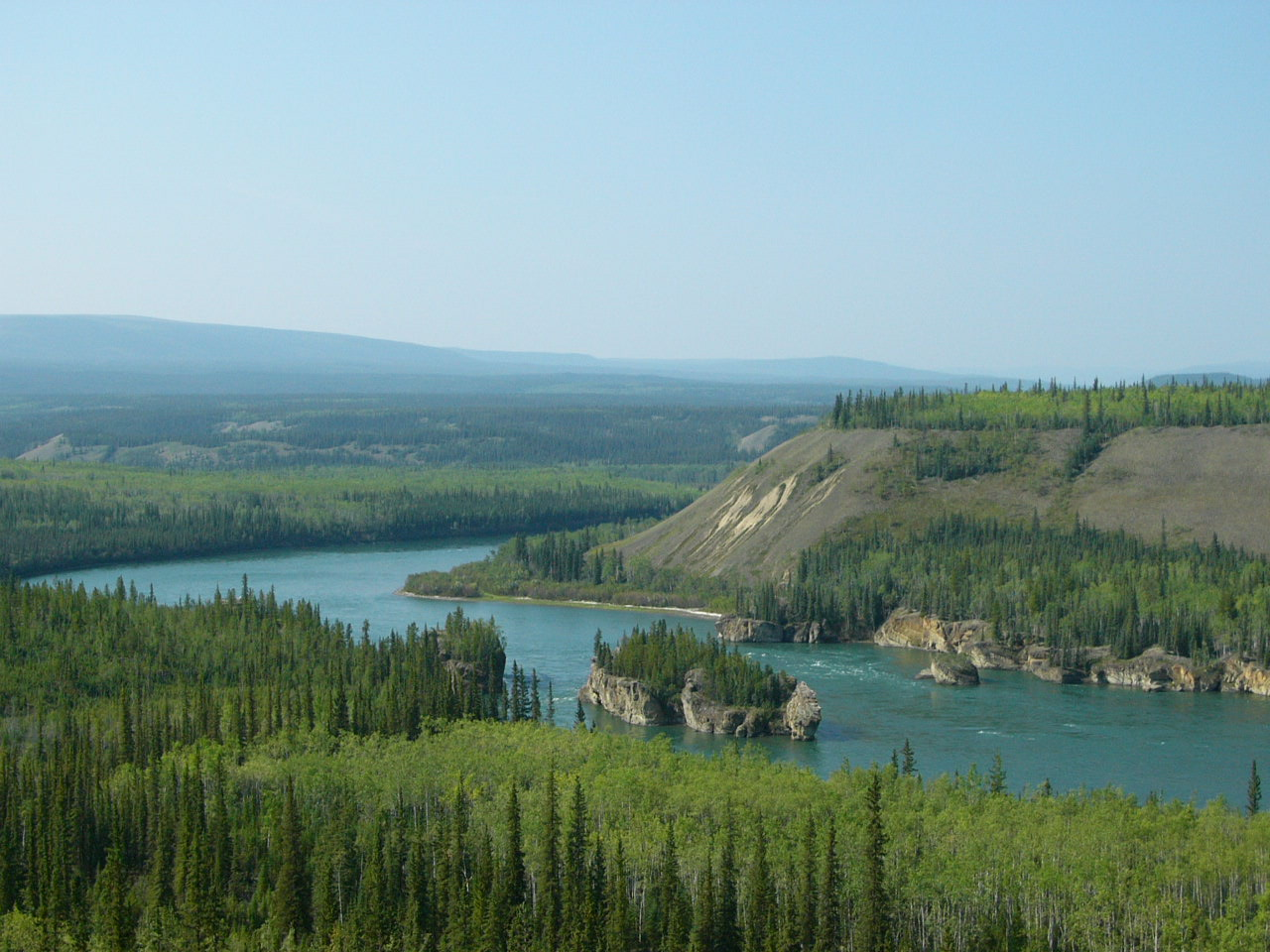
Five Finger Rapids seen from Klondike Highway

The Five Finger Rapids, also known as the Five Fingers, are located on the Yukon River, Yukon, Canada. Four islands of composite rock divide the river into five narrow channels of which only the eastern is passable to canoes paddling upstream.

== History ==
Indigenous Canadians called the Five Finger Rapids "Tthi-cho Nadezhe," or "big rocks standing up."

The Five Finger Rapids were a common obstacle for gold seekers during the Klondike Gold Rush; the Yukon River was originally believed to be unnavigable above the rapids. Writer and artist Tappan Adney described them:

"The opening is about one hundred feet wide, with vertical walls, through which the river drops a couple of feet, the waves rising angrily in a return curl, then dancing on in rapidly diminishing chops until lost in the swift current below. We turn our prow squarely for the middle of the cleft; a drop, a smash, a few quarts of water over the sides, and we are shot through into the fast current, without even looking back."

From 1900 to around 1927, blasting was undergone at the rapids, widening the channel by 6 meters (20 feet).

== In literature ==
The Five Finger Rapids are mentioned in Jack London's novel The Call of the Wild. The Five Finger Rapids are also mentioned in Alastair Humphrey's novel Thunder and Sunshine. Humphrey's canoe tips while passing through the rapids during his four-year journey around the world by bike.
