= Keno City =

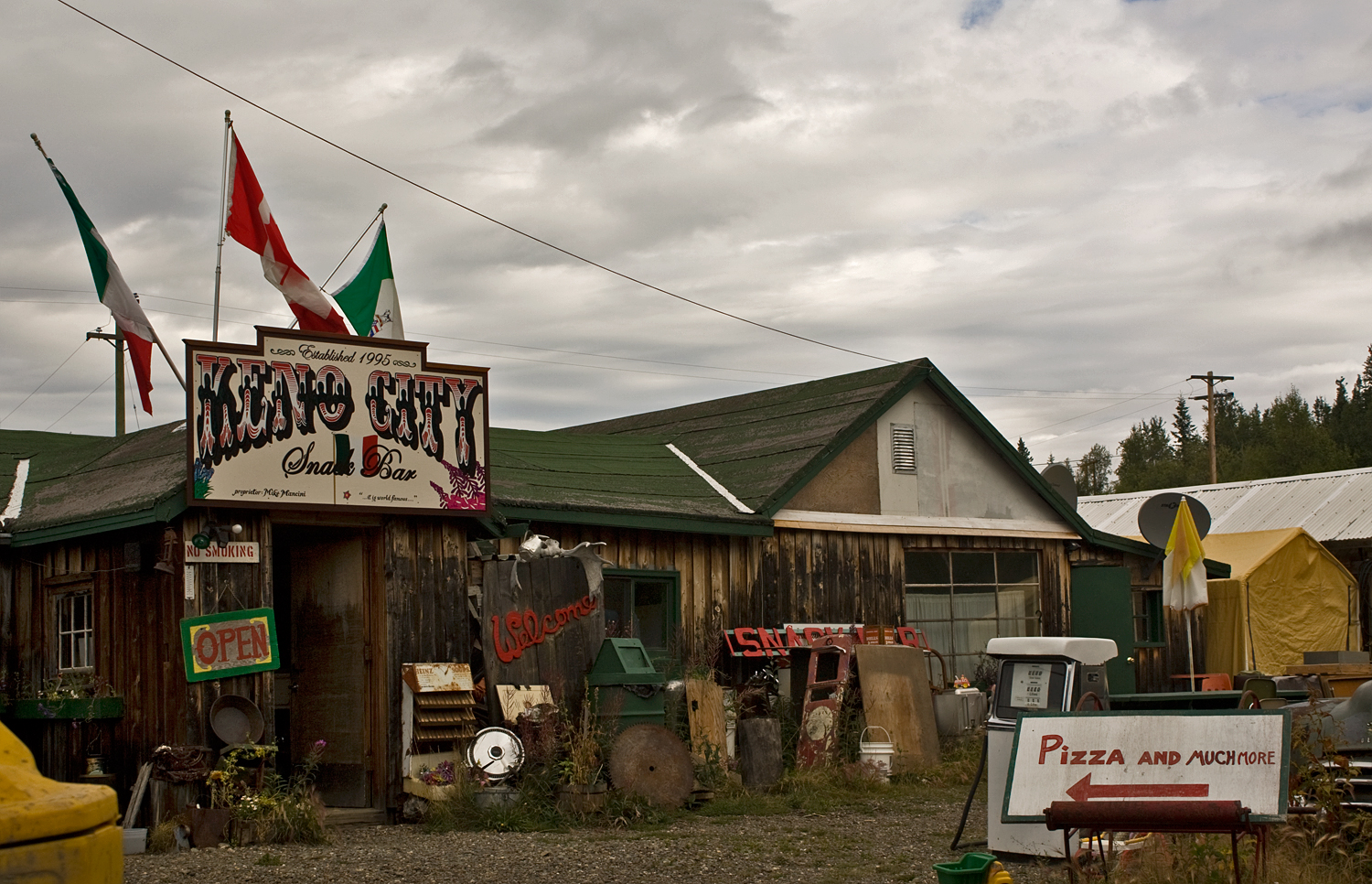
- Nickname: Keno
- Location within Yukon
- Coordinates: 63°54′33″N 135°18′15″W
- Country: Canada
- Territory: Yukon

Population (2021)
  - Total: 20
- Time zone: UTC−07:00 (MST)

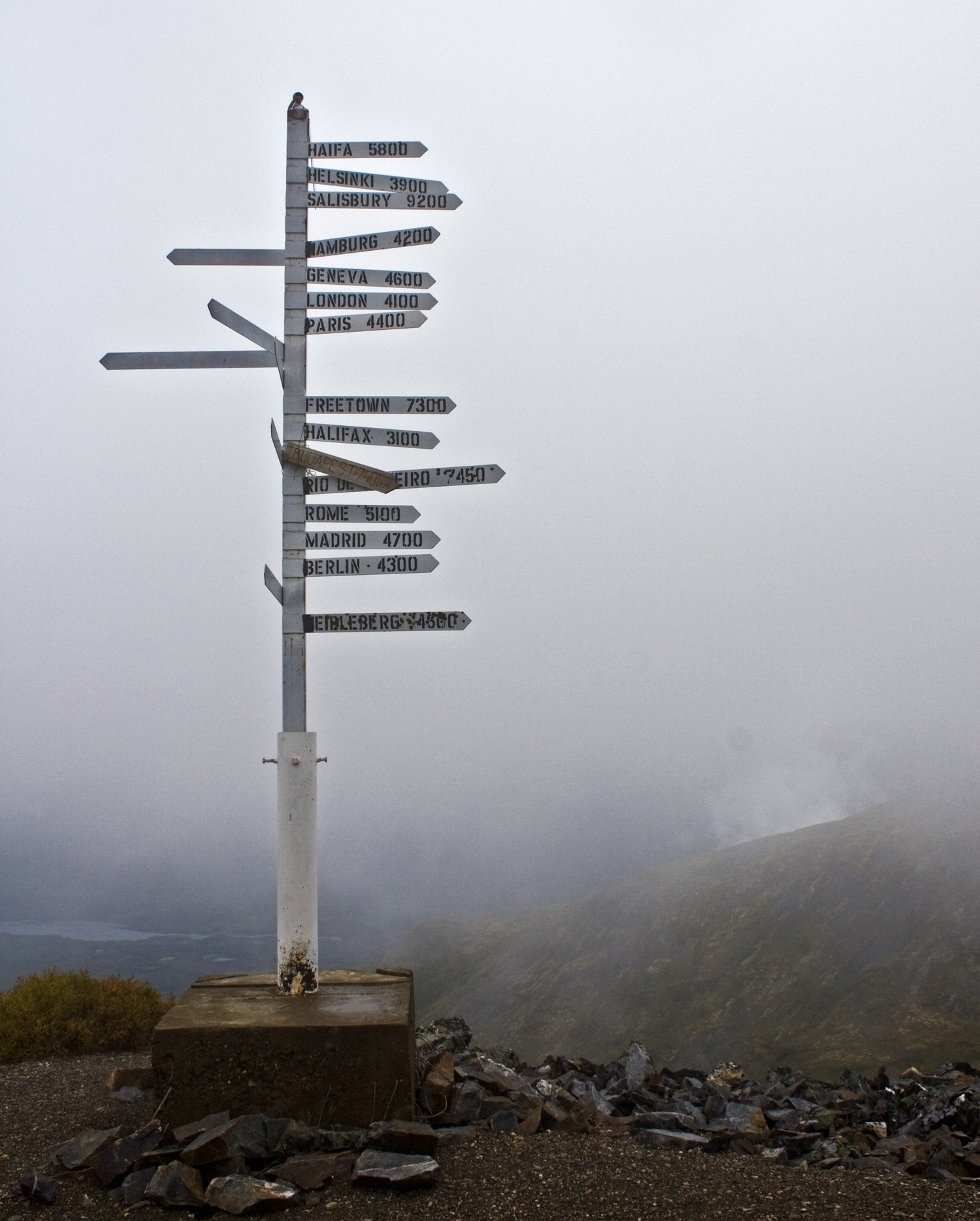
Signpost at Keno Hill

Keno City is a small community in Yukon, Canada, at the end of the Silver Trail highway. Keno City was the site of a former silver-lead mining area proximal to Keno Hill. Keno City is 13 kilometres away from Elsa, Yukon, which is owned by Hecla Mining who currently own and operate the various Ag-Pb-Zn deposits in the Keno Hill area. Rich silver and lead ore deposits were found on Keno Hill in 1919, and since then the population of the community has fluctuated in response to the mining activity in the area. When in 1989 United Keno Hill closed the mines, literally overnight, the people in the Keno area who decided to stay chose a more sustainable economy: tourism. They successfully marketed Keno City as a quiet, tranquil community.

== History ==
Keno City was named after the gambling game Keno popular in mining camps at the turn of the 20th century. A small placer mining operation is behind Keno City, indicating the present support for active disturbance of earth materials through mining in the vicinity of Keno City. Some people believe that fewer materials will be moved through the new Alexco proposal than have been moved by placer mining around Keno City. The issue, however, is not the amount of material being moved but the placing of an industrial facility (crusher/mill/tailings) close to a residential community.

Keno City has also developed some tourism-based businesses, and its attraction is the Keno Mining Museum with an extensive collection dedicated to the history of mining in Yukon from the early 1900s until the present. The signpost on the top of Keno Hill shows distances to other locales around the world.

Keno City is located at Mile 69.1 of the Silver Trail, Yukon Highway 11.

The British Yukon Navigation Company sternwheeler SS Keno is preserved in Dawson City and protected as a National Historic Site.

The 2004 Kim Barlow album Luckyburden is about Keno City. Two tracks are recorded live at the Keno City Snackbar.

Whitehorse-based singer/songwriter Megan Haddock references Keno City in her 2015 song "Small Town".

== Demographics ==
Federal census population history of Keno Hill
Year	Pop.	±%
1981	88	—
1986	47	−46.6%
1991	36	−23.4%
1996	24	−33.3%
2001	20	−16.7%
2006	15	−25.0%
2011	28	+86.7%
2016	20	−28.6%
2021	20	+0.0%
Source: Statistics Canada

In the 2021 Census of Population conducted by Statistics Canada, Keno Hill had a population of 20 living in 16 of its 52 total private dwellings, a change of 0% from its 2016 population of 20. With a land area of 53.88 km^{2} (20.80 sq mi), it had a population density of 0.4/km^{2} (1.0/sq mi) in 2021.

== Economy ==
With the property abandoned by the previous owners, and mounting environmental impacts due to metal laden water coming from mine adits, in 2006 the Federal Government sold the assets of former United Keno Hill Mines through the Supreme Court to an Alexco Resource Corp. (Vancouver based mining company) subsidiary for $410,000. Alexco now became the 100% owner of the Yukon Keno Hill Silver district (23,350 hectares hosting 35 prior producing mines, its own private town of Elsa, and the infrastructure), with a requirement to stop the environmental degradation and a contract to clean up past impacts. With this deal Alexco also became the sole-source clean-up contractor to the Government of Canada in charge to clean up the environmental mess left by former mining activities (estimated $60+ millions of taxpayer's monies).

In 2009 Alexco decided to resume silver mining in the district. Some of the 15 residents of Keno City have opposed a proposal by Alexco to build the crusher/mill and tailing facility less than one kilometre from their homes in Keno City, YT which will impact this quiet small community. The ore was historically processed in Elsa, which is located approximately 13 km away from Keno City. This proposal was recommended to proceed subject to specified terms and conditions by the Mayo Designated Office of Yukon Socio-Economic Assessment board (YESAB). Yukon's Department of Energy, Mines and Resources (EMR) issued the Quartz Mining Licence in November 2009. While some of the 15 residents of Keno continue to oppose the mill location, support for the project includes the local community of Mayo and the First Nation of Nacho Nyak Dun. First Nation of Nacho Nyak Dun as well as residents of Mayo live 60 km away from the mill plant. Recent test runs of just the ball mill have shown noise levels of 50- 55 dbA.
