= Silver Trail =

Highway in Yukon Territory

Silver Trail
- Yukon Highway 11
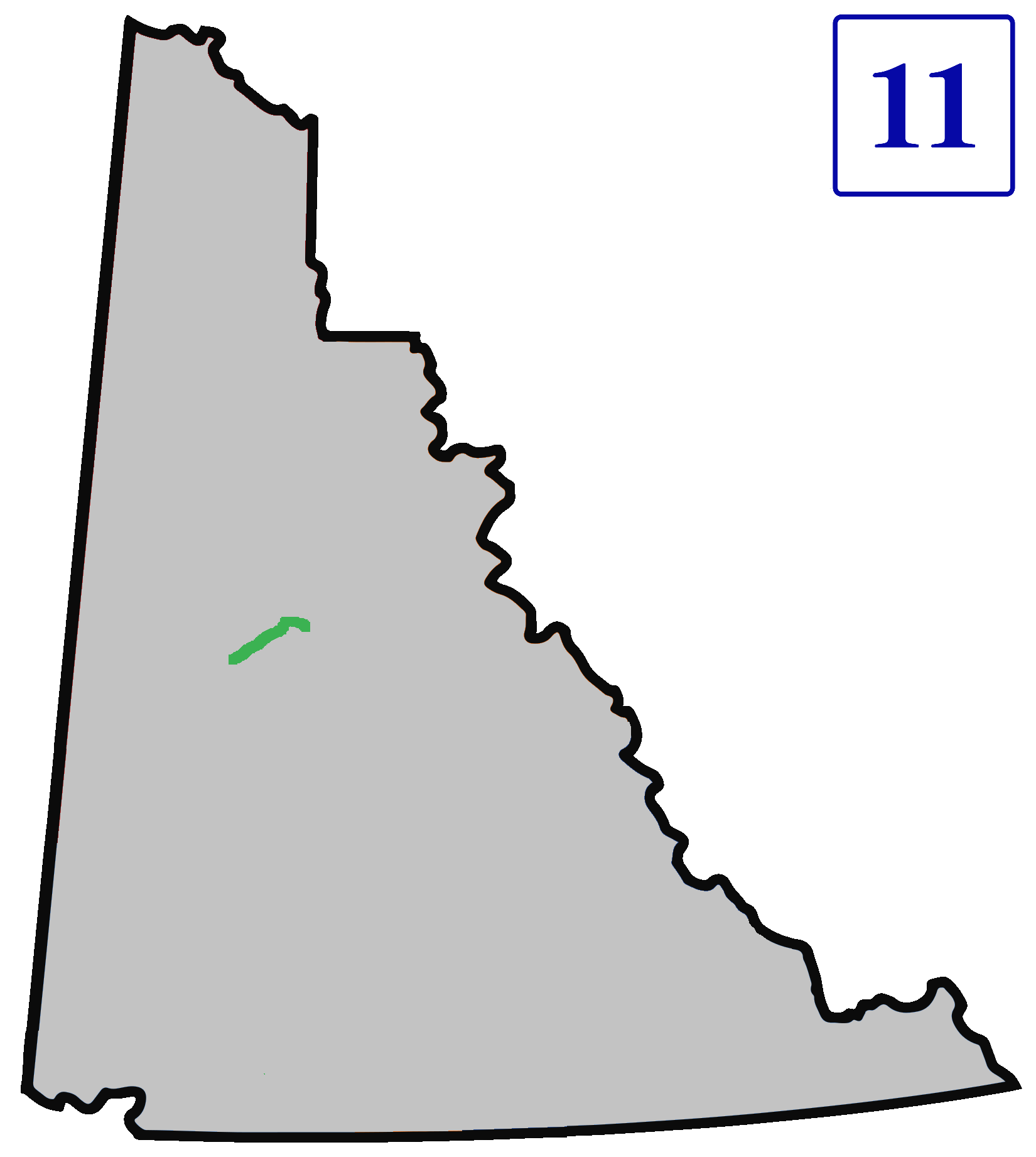

Route information
- Maintained by Yukon DOH&PW
- Length: 110 km (68 mi)

Major junctions
- West end: Hwy 2 (Klondike Highway) in Stewart Crossing
- East end: Keno City

Location
- Country: Canada
- Province: Yukon

Highway system
- Territorial highways in Yukon; Miscellaneous
← Hwy 10	→ Hwy 37

The Silver Trail, officially Yukon Highway 11, is a highway in the Canadian territory of Yukon connecting the communities of Mayo and Keno City with the Klondike Highway at Stewart Crossing. It was originally built in 1950–51 as the Whitehorse–Mayo Road, and originally designated as Highway 2. The route was renumbered in 1978 as Highway 11, and in the mid-1980s was given its current name to reflect to the historic operations of silver mining in the district.

The highway is paved for the first 62 kilometres (39 mi), then continues as a gravel road to the ghost town of Elsa and onward to Keno City. A network of rural roads winds through the area including the former route of the Silver Trail, now called Duncan Creek Road, which runs from Kilometre 68.2 (Mile 42.4) of the current Silver Trail to Keno City.

== Major intersections ==
The following is a list of major intersections along the Silver Trail:

Location	km	mi	Destinations	Notes
Stewart Crossing	0.0	0.0	Hwy 2 (Klondike Highway) – Dawson City, Whitehorse	Western terminus
Mayo	49.6	30.8	Crosses the Mayo River	
Mayo	50.0	31.1	Dyke Road	
Mayo	50.3	31.3	Mayo Road	
Mayo	51.7	32.1	Mayo Airport	
Minto Bridge	64.0	39.8	Crosses the Mayo River	
	68.2	42.4	Duncan Creek Road	Original route of the Silver Trail, continues east to Keno City
	87.0	54.1	South McQuesten Trail	
Elsa	97.0	60.3		Ghost town, closed to the public
Keno City	110.0	68.4	Duncan Creek Road	Eastern terminus
1.000 mi = 1.609 km; 1.000 km = 0.621 mi

== See also ==
- List of Yukon territorial highways
