= Mayo, Yukon =

Mayo
- Village
- Village of Mayo
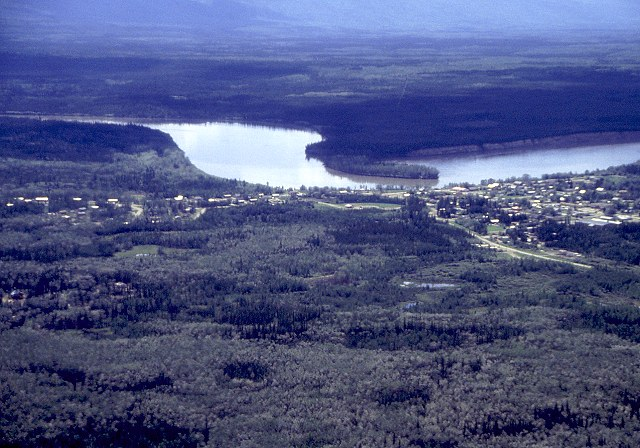
- Mayo upon Stewart River, circa 2000

- Location of Mayo Mayo (Canada)
- Coordinates: 63°35′33″N 135°53′52″W
- Country: Canada
- Territory: Yukon
- Established: 1903

Government
  - Mayor: Trevor Ellis
  - Governing body: Village of Mayo Council
  - MP: Brendan Hanley
  - MLA: Jeremy Harper

Area (2021)
  - Land: 0.98 km^{2} (0.38 sq mi)

Population (2021)
  - Total: 188
  - Density: 191.8/km^{2} (497/sq mi)
- Time zone: UTC−07:00 (MST)
- Forward sortation area: Y0B 1M0
- Area code: 867
- Website: Official website

Mayo is a village in Yukon, Canada, along the Silver Trail and the Stewart River. It had a population of 200 in 2016. The Yukon Bureau of Statistics estimated a population of 496 in 2019. It is also the home of the First Nation of Na-Cho Nyak Dun, whose people primarily speak the northern variety of the Tutchone language. Na-Cho Nyäk Dun translates into "big river people."

The community, formerly called Mayo Landing, is serviced by Mayo Airport. The village was named after former circus acrobat turned settler and explorer Alfred Mayo.

== History ==
Before Europeans came to the area, it was inhabited by two communities of the Na-cho Nyäk Dun people, who lived by hunting and trapping. The river now known as the Stewart River was known as the "Náhcho Nyäk" ('Great River'). The people lived across the Stewart River from the main focus of today's Mayo, in a district today called "Old Mayo Village". The old settlement was reinstated on the initiative of a missionary, but in 1936, the river burst its banks and flattened much of the old village, destroying the church and many cultural treasures.

The first gold discoveries in the area were made in the 1880s: silver was also discovered some time later. Until the middle of the 20th century Mayo was only connected with the outside world by the river and received any supplies by boat. In the 1950s the construction of the Klondike Highway and the Silver Trail provided Mayo with a road link to Stewart Crossing.

Between 1973 and 1984 negotiation took place between the government and Northern Tutchone leaders over land rights and self-government. A breakthrough came only in 1993 with a treaty between the residents and the lawmakers concerning an area of 4,739 km^{2} (1,830 sq mi) and a payment, over fifteen years, totalling C$14.5 million.

Together with the Trʼondëk Hwëchʼin First Nation an agreement has been made with Yukon Energy to supply electricity to Dawson City using the Mayo-Dawson Power Line.

May 2008 saw a preliminary agreement with Alexco Resource Corp concerning silver extraction in the Keno Hill Silver area near the far end of Mayo Lake (approximately 45 km (28 mi) northeast of the village) where the corporation operates approximately 40 silver mines.

== Demographics ==
Federal census population history of Mayo
Year	Pop.	±%
1951	241	—
1956	249	+3.3%
1961	342	+37.3%
1966	479	+40.1%
1971	381	−20.5%
1976	448	+17.6%
1981	398	−11.2%
1986	317	−20.4%
1991	243	−23.3%
1996	324	+33.3%
2001	366	+13.0%
2006	248	−32.2%
2011	226	−8.9%
2016	200	−11.5%
2021	188	−6.0%
Source: Statistics Canada

In the 2021 Canadian census conducted by Statistics Canada, Mayo had a population of 188 living in 108 of its 149 total private dwellings, a change of −6% from its 2016 population of 200. With a land area of 0.98 km^{2} (0.38 sq mi), it had a population density of 191.8/km^{2} (496.9/sq mi) in 2021.

As of 2021, the population speaks mostly English. The breakdown of mother tongues is:

- English as first language: 84.2%
- French as first language: 5.3%
- English and French as first language: 2.6%
- Other as first language: 7.9%

== Geography ==
=== Climate ===
Mayo has a subarctic climate (Köppen: Dfc), with generally warm summers and severely cold winters lasting half the year. Spring and autumn are very short transitional seasons between summer and winter, with average temperatures rising and falling very fast during these times.

The temperature difference between the record low in February (−62.2 °C [−80.0 °F]) and the record high in June (36.1 °C (97.0 °F)) is (−98.3 °C (−176.9 °F)), one of the largest temperature differentials ever recorded. It has some of the warmest summers in the Yukon with a mean average summer temperature of 14.7 °C (58.5 °F).

Climate data for Mayo (Mayo Airport) WMO ID: 71965; coordinates 63°37′N 135°52′W; elevation: 503.8 m (1,653 ft); 1991–2020 normals, extremes 1924–present
Month	Jan	Feb	Mar	Apr	May	Jun	Jul	Aug	Sep	Oct	Nov	Dec	Year
Record high humidex	9.6	12.2	15.6	22.5	33.2	38.5	37.3	34.6	29.2	22.5	13.3	11.4	38.5
Record high °C (°F)	10.1 (50.2)	12.2 (54.0)	15.8 (60.4)	22.8 (73.0)	33.5 (92.3)	36.1 (97.0)	35.6 (96.1)	32.6 (90.7)	26.7 (80.1)	22.6 (72.7)	13.9 (57.0)	11.8 (53.2)	36.1 (97.0)
Mean daily maximum °C (°F)	−18.1 (−0.6)	−10.9 (12.4)	−3.0 (26.6)	7.5 (45.5)	15.9 (60.6)	21.6 (70.9)	22.6 (72.7)	19.5 (67.1)	12.3 (54.1)	1.7 (35.1)	−10.6 (12.9)	−14.6 (5.7)	3.6 (38.5)
Daily mean °C (°F)	−23.2 (−9.8)	−17.0 (1.4)	−9.8 (14.4)	1.2 (34.2)	9.2 (48.6)	14.7 (58.5)	16.1 (61.0)	13.3 (55.9)	6.7 (44.1)	−2.2 (28.0)	−15.0 (5.0)	−19.9 (−3.8)	−2.2 (28.0)
Mean daily minimum °C (°F)	−28.3 (−18.9)	−23.1 (−9.6)	−16.6 (2.1)	−5.1 (22.8)	2.4 (36.3)	7.8 (46.0)	9.5 (49.1)	7.0 (44.6)	1.1 (34.0)	−6.2 (20.8)	−19.4 (−2.9)	−25.1 (−13.2)	−8.0 (17.6)
Record low °C (°F)	−58.3 (−72.9)	−62.2 (−80.0)	−48.9 (−56.0)	−41.1 (−42.0)	−21.7 (−7.1)	−3.9 (25.0)	−2.8 (27.0)	−10.6 (12.9)	−15.6 (3.9)	−36.7 (−34.1)	−50.6 (−59.1)	−57.8 (−72.0)	−62.2 (−80.0)
Record low wind chill	−65.8	−60.0	−59.0	−36.5	−19.0	−3.8	0.0	−9.1	−22.8	−38.2	−55.1	−64.3	−65.8
Average precipitation mm (inches)	18.6 (0.73)	12.9 (0.51)	11.4 (0.45)	9.8 (0.39)	21.3 (0.84)	42.5 (1.67)	53.2 (2.09)	45.6 (1.80)	40.2 (1.58)	25.9 (1.02)	24.4 (0.96)	21.2 (0.83)	326.9 (12.87)
Average rainfall mm (inches)	0.3 (0.01)	0.1 (0.00)	0.2 (0.01)	3.7 (0.15)	20.2 (0.80)	42.4 (1.67)	53.2 (2.09)	45.4 (1.79)	35.9 (1.41)	9.1 (0.36)	0.3 (0.01)	0.1 (0.00)	210.9 (8.30)
Average snowfall cm (inches)	30.0 (11.8)	20.0 (7.9)	15.8 (6.2)	7.4 (2.9)	1.1 (0.4)	0.1 (0.0)	0.0 (0.0)	0.0 (0.0)	4.3 (1.7)	20.3 (8.0)	35.3 (13.9)	33.0 (13.0)	167.3 (65.9)
Average precipitation days (≥ 0.2 mm)	10.5	8.4	6.4	5.5	9.0	13.3	15.1	14.2	13.2	11.7	12.7	11.6	131.5
Average rainy days (≥ 0.2 mm)	0.13	0.08	0.24	2.5	8.8	13.3	15.1	14.1	12.0	4.5	0.25	0.17	71.2
Average snowy days (≥ 0.2 cm)	12.2	9.0	6.8	3.4	0.63	0.04	0.0	0.0	1.4	8.5	13.4	12.9	68.3
Average relative humidity (%) (at 1500 LST)	79.3	74.4	59.2	43.7	37.0	40.2	47.2	50.9	55.1	70.8	80.1	80.7	59.9
Source: Environment and Climate Change Canada

== Education ==
The only school is the J.V. Clark School, which is named after James Vincent Clark (1924–1994). As of December 2022 the school had 46 students with 34 in primary and 12 in secondary grades. As of the 2023 - 2024 school year the principal is Douglas Cooper.

== See also ==
- List of municipalities in Yukon
