= Elsa, Yukon =

Ghost town in Yukon, Canada

Coordinates: 63°54′42″N 135°29′27″W

Elsa is a former privately owned mining town in the Canadian territory of Yukon, between the Stewart River valley to the south and the Mackenzie Mountains to the north. It is located at Kilometre 97 (Mile 60.3) of the Silver Trail, approximately 700 kilometres (435 mi) north of Whitehorse and 600 km (373 mi) east of the Alaskan border.

== History ==
Federal census population history of Elsa
Year	Pop.	±%
1941	98	—
1951	147	+50.0%
1956	193	+31.3%
1961	395	+104.7%
1966	529	+33.9%
1971	298	−43.7%
1976	456	+53.0%
1981	336	−26.3%
1986	294	−12.5%
1991	8	−97.3%
Population in 1956 is 247 if including adjacent community of Flat Creek that had a population of 54. Source: Statistics Canada

The town was built in 1935 by the mining company Treadwell Yukon to support the development of a new mill for the nearby deposits of silver, lead, and zinc. Treadwell's assets were purchased by United Keno Hill Mines (UKHM) in 1946, and by the 1950s UKHM was the second largest producer of silver in Canada and the fourth largest in the world.

At its peak in the 1960s, Elsa was home to 600 UKHM employees and their families. Due to economic pressure from decreases in the price of silver in the late 1970s, United Keno Hill Mines ceased operations in Elsa in 1989. UKHM attempted to sell mining rights to various companies but declared bankruptcy in 1998, with its mining assets reverting to the Government of Canada.

Elsa is now a ghost town and is closed to the public.
