= List of communities in Yukon =

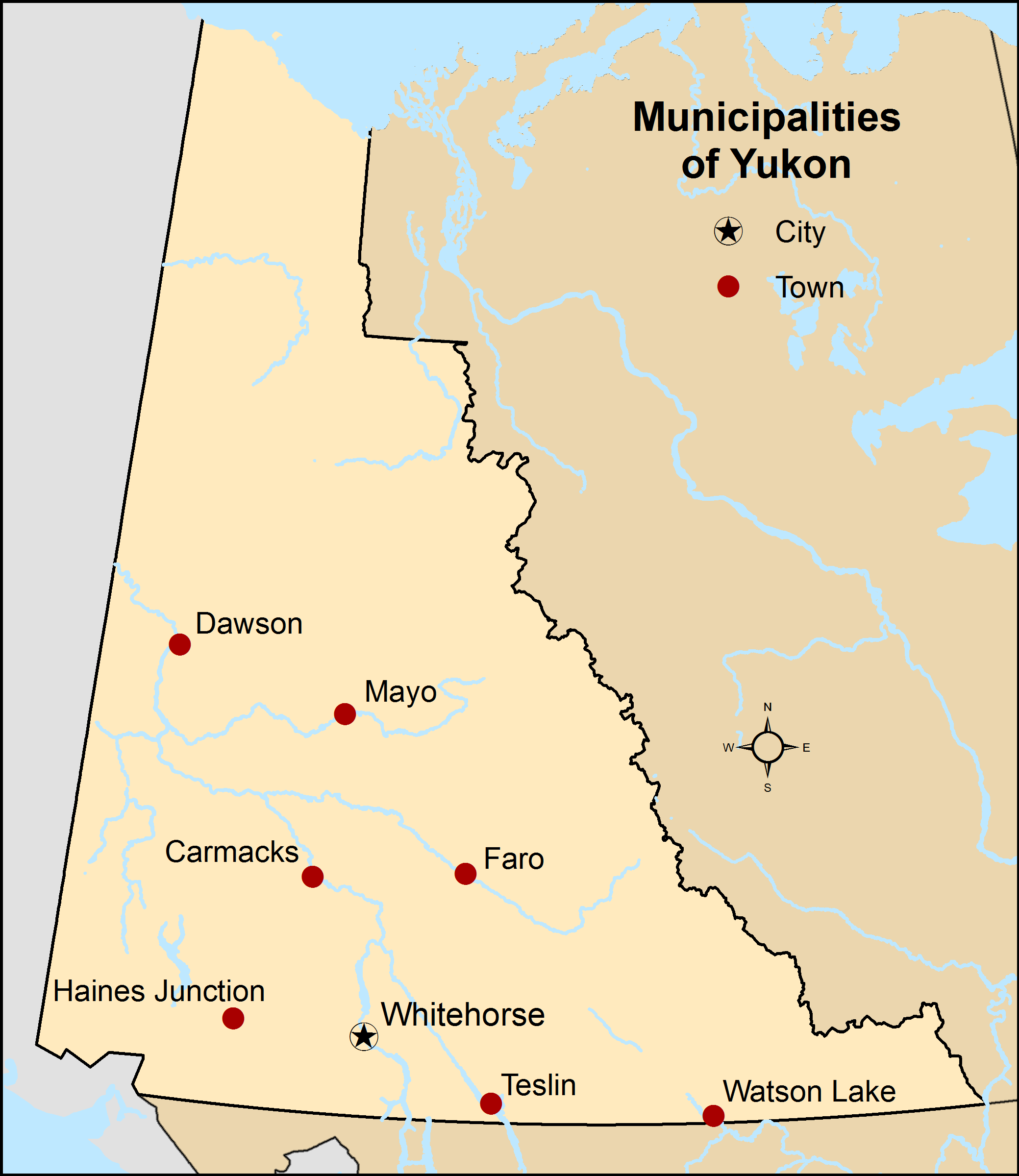
Distribution of Yukon's eight municipalities by type

This is a list of communities in Yukon, Canada.

== Municipalities ==
List of municipalities in Yukon
Name	Status	Official name	Incorporation date	2021 Census of Population				
Name	Status	Official name	Incorporation date	Population (2021)	Population (2016)	Change	Land area (km^{2})	Population density (/km^{2})
Carmacks	Town	Village of Carmacks	November 1, 1984	588	493	+19.3%	36.87	15.9
Dawson	Town	City of Dawson (Note: As of the 2001 Municipal Act, the town's official legal name is the "City of Dawson".)	January 9, 1902	1,577	1,375	+14.7%	30.91	51.0
Faro	Town	Town of Faro	June 13, 1969	440	348	+26.4%	199.89	2.2
Haines Junction	Town	Village of Haines Junction	October 1, 1984	688	613	+12.2%	34.30	20.1
Mayo	Town	Village of Mayo	June 1, 1984	188	200	−6.0%	0.98	191.8
Teslin	Town	Village of Teslin	August 1, 1984	239	255	−6.3%	3.77	63.4
Watson Lake	Town	Town of Watson Lake	April 1, 1984	1,133	1,083	+4.6%	109.77	10.3
Whitehorse	City	City of Whitehorse	June 1, 1950	28,201	25,085	+12.4%	413.94	68.1
Total municipalities				33,054	29,452	+12.2%	830.43	39.8
Yukon				40,232	35,874	+12.1%	472,345.44	0.1

== Unincorporated communities ==
These areas lie within the Unorganized Yukon, which covers 99.8% of the territory's land mass.

=== Hamlets ===
Statistics Canada recognizes two census subdivisions in Yukon that are classified as hamlets.

- Ibex Valley
- Mount Lorne

=== Localities ===
The Gazetteer of Yukon recognized 96 localities as of February 2012. Two of these localities, Tagish and Upper Liard, are designated as census subdivisions by Statistics Canada, though are classified as settlements.

- Aishihik
- Ballarat Creek
- Barlow
- Bear Creek
- Black Hills
- Boundary
- Braeburn
- Brewer Creek
- Britannia Creek
- Brooks Brook
- Calumet
- Canyon
- Canyon City
- Carcross Cutoff
- Caribou
- Champagne
- Clear Creek
- Clinton Creek
- Coffee Creek
- Conrad
- Dalton Post
- De Wette
- Dezadeash
- Donjek
- Dominion
- Dry Creek
- Dundalk
- Eagle Plains
- Flat Creek
- Fort Reliance
- Fort Selkirk
- Forty Mile
- Frances Lake
- Glacier Creek
- Glenboyle
- Gold Bottom
- Gold Run
- Gordon Landing
- Grand Forks
- Granville, Yukon
- Gravel Lake
- Herschel
- Hootalinqua
- Hundred Mile Landing
- Hutshi
- Isaac Creek
- Jakes Corner
- Jensen Creek
- Kirkman Creek
- Kloo Lake
- Klondike
- Klukshu
- Koidern
- Kynocks
- Lansdowne
- Lansing
- Lapierre House
- Little Gold
- Little River
- Little Salmon
- Little Teslin Lake
- Livingstone, Yukon
- Livingstone Creek
- Lorne, Yukon
- Mason Landing
- McCabe Creek
- McClintok
- McQuesten
- Mendenhall Landing
- Minto, Yukon
- Minto Bridge
- Montague, Yukon
- Moosehide
- Morley River
- Nesketahin
- Ogilvie
- Paris
- Pelly Lakes
- Quill Creek
- Rampart House
- Rancheria
- Readford
- Robinson
- Rock Creek
- Scroggie Creek
- Selwyn
- Silver City
- Sixtymile
- Snag
- Snag Junction
- Stevens Roadhouse
- Stewart River
- Stony Creek Camp
- Sulphur
- Summit Roadhouse
- Tagish (also designated a census subdivision)
- Takhini
- Takhini Hot Springs
- Ten Mile
- Teslin Crossing
- Teslin Lake
- Teslin River
- Thistle Creek
- Tuchitua
- Upper Laberge
- Upper Liard (also designated a census subdivision)
- Watson
- Wernecke
- West Dawson
- Whitefish Station
- Whitestone Village
- Yukon Crossing

==== Dalton Post ====
Dalton Post or Shäwshe is a former trading post and First Nations community on the Tatshenshini River. It was on the Dalton Trail near the Haines Highway. Today, it is a prime Pacific salmon fishing spot and serves as a base for whitewater rafting expeditions on the Tatshenshini and Alsek Rivers in the Tatshenshini-Alsek Provincial Park.

==== Jakes Corner ====
Jakes Corner is a spot on the road, at historical mile 866 of the Alaska Highway, at the junction with connections to the Tagish Road and the Atlin Road. There are a small number of area residents, the junction being best known for a gas station and café. The gas station has numerous examples of old machinery.

==== Klukshu ====
Klukshu's more recent history is as a seasonal aboriginal fishing community, benefitting from a large Chinook salmon run. Located near the Haines Highway, it has no permanent population. Interpretive information is provided by the Champagne and Aishihik First Nations.

==== Little Salmon ====
Little Salmon is located on the Robert Campbell Highway between Faro and Carmacks, and stretches along the lake of the same name and the Yukon River. The only non-residential establishment is the Yukon government highway maintenance camp at Drury Creek. It was formerly an important settlement of the Little Salmon/Carmacks First Nation.

==== Silver City ====
Silver City, a historic mining town, is today only the residence of a small number of people, one household being a bed and breakfast establishment. It is located at historical mile 1053 of the Alaska Highway. It contains an airport, Silver City Airport.

==== Sulphur ====
Sulphur or Sulphur Creek was a mining camp south-east of Dawson on a creek of the same name that flows into the Indian River. A post office was opened there on 28 October 1903 by G. W. Coffin. It was closed in July 1922. The place is mentioned in Jack London's story, "To Build a Fire".

=== Settlements ===
The Gazetteer of Yukon recognized 29 settlements as of February 2012. Eleven of these settlements are designated as census subdivisions by Statistics Canada.

- Arlington
- Armstrong
- Bear Creek
- Beaver Creek – also designated a census subdivision
- Big Salmon
- Burwash Landing – also designated a census subdivision
- Carcross – also designated a census subdivision
- Destruction Bay – also designated a census subdivision
- Dry Creek
- Dundalk
- Herschel
- Hundred Mile Landing
- Johnsons Crossing – also designated a census subdivision
- Keno Hill – also designated a census subdivision
- Lewis
- Livingstone
- Lower Laberge
- Marsh Lake
- Mendenhall Landing
- Old Crow – also designated a census subdivision
- Pelly Crossing – also designated a census subdivision
- Rampart House
- Ross River – also designated a census subdivision
- Selwyn
- Snag
- Stewart Crossing – also designated a census subdivision
- Stewart River
- Swift River – also designated a census subdivision
- Teslin Lake

==== Herschel ====
Herschel was a settlement on Herschel Island, serving as a whaling station, North-West Mounted Police post and Hudson's Bay Company store. It has been long abandoned, and shoreline erosion is threatening to wipe out the remaining buildings.

==== Stewart River ====
Stewart River is a former settlement at the juncture of the Yukon and Stewart rivers. A few buildings and cabins remain, as well as private museum, which are threatened by erosion. It was founded as a trading post in the 1880s before the Klondike Gold Rush to serve placer miners working along the Stewart River. The Burian family was still living there in the late 1980s.

== First Nations communities ==
Statistics Canada recognizes five census subdivisions in Yukon that are classified as Indian settlements, and four census subdivisions as self-governments.

=== Indian settlements ===
- Champagne – also recognized as a locality
- Kloo Lake
- Klukshu – also recognized as a locality
- Two Mile Village
- Two and One-Half Mile Village

=== Self-governments ===
- Carcross 4
- Lake Laberge 1
- Moosehide Creek 2
- Teslin Post 13

== Ghost towns ==
- Elsa
- Clinton Creek
- Fort Frances
- Forty Mile
- Miner's Prayer

=== Miner's Prayer ===
Miner's Prayer was settled near the Blackstone River Mining Concern, providing a retreat where the miners could indulge in billiards, alcohol and other entertainment otherwise forbidden on the mining settlement. Today it is home to fewer than thirty permanent residents. It can be accessed by gravel road veering west from mile 57 on the Dempster Highway.

== See also ==
- List of cities in Canada
- List of towns in Canada
