= Outline of Yukon =

Overview of and topical guide to Yukon

The following outline is provided as an overview of and topical guide to Yukon.

Yukon is the westernmost and smallest of Canada's three federal territories. Whitehorse is the territorial capital. The Territory was named after the Yukon River. The word Yukon means "Great River" or "Big Stream" in Gwich'in.

== Geography of Yukon ==
Geography of Yukon

- Yukon is: a territory of Canada
- Location:
  - The regions in which Yukon is located are:
    - Northern Hemisphere, Western Hemisphere
      - Americas
        - North America
          - Northern America
            - Canada
              - Western Canada
  - Extreme points of Yukon
- Population of Yukon: 40,232
- Area of Yukon: 582,443 km^{2} (224,882 sq mi)
- Atlas of Yukon

=== Environment of Yukon ===
- Protected areas of Yukon
  - Historic places in Yukon
    - Ghost towns in Yukon
    - National Historic Sites of Canada in Yukon
      - National Register of Historic Places listings in Yukon-Charley Rivers National Preserve
      - National Register of Historic Places listings in Yukon–Koyukuk Census Area, Alaska

==== Natural geographic features of Yukon ====
- Lakes in Yukon
- Rivers in Yukon

==== Regions of Yukon ====
- Communities in Yukon
- Municipalities in Yukon

=== Demographics of Yukon ===
- Demographics of Yukon

== Government and politics of Yukon ==
- Elections of Yukon
  - General elections of Yukon
  - By-elections of Yukon
- Political parties in Yukon

=== Government of Yukon ===
==== Executive branch of the government of Yukon ====
- Premier of Yukon
  - Premiers of Yukon
- Commissioner of Yukon
- Order of precedence in Yukon
- Executive Council of Yukon (Cabinet)

==== Legislative branch of the government of Yukon ====
- Yukon Legislative Assembly
  - Leaders of Opposition of Yukon
  - 32nd Legislature of Yukon
  - 33rd Legislature of Yukon

==== Judicial branch of the government of Yukon ====
- Territorial Court of Yukon
- Supreme Court of Yukon

=== Law of Yukon ===
- Same-sex marriage in Yukon

== History of Yukon ==
- History of Yukon

== Culture of Yukon ==
- Museums in Yukon
- Music of Yukon
- People of Yukon
  - Yukoners
- Religion in Yukon
  - Christianity in Yukon
    - Diocese of Yukon
    - Prefecture Apostolic of Yukon
- Scouting and Guiding in Yukon
- Symbols of Yukon
  - Coat of arms of Yukon
  - Flag of Yukon

== Economy and infrastructure of Yukon ==
- Communication in Yukon
  - Radio stations in Yukon
  - Television transmitters in Yukon
- Energy in Yukon
  - Electricity generating stations in Yukon
- Mining in Yukon
  - Faro
  - Kudz Ze Kayah mine
- Transport in Yukon
  - Air transport in Yukon
    - Airlines of Yukon
    - Airports in Yukon
  - Vehicular transport in Yukon
    - Vehicle registration plates of Yukon
    - Road system in Yukon
      - Territorial highways of Yukon

== Education in Yukon ==
- List of schools in Yukon
- Museums in Yukon
- Higher education in Yukon

== See also ==
- Yukon NDP members
- Yukon Quest competitors
