= Unorganized Yukon =

- Unorganized area
- Coordinates: 63°38′N 135°46′W
- Country: Canada
- Territory: Yukon

Area
  - Land: 445,269.81 km^{2} (171,919.63 sq mi)

Population (2021)
  - Total: 1,496
- Time zone: UTC−07:00 (MST)

Unorganized Yukon, or Yukon, Unorganized, is the unorganized area covering the majority of Yukon, Canada. It represents 98% of Yukon's 474,712.64 km^{2} (183,287.57 sq mi) land mass, and is recognized as a census subdivision by Statistics Canada.

== Demographics ==
In the 2021 Census of Population conducted by Statistics Canada, Unorganized Yukon had a population of 1,496 living in 735 of its 1,184 total private dwellings, a change of 7.8% from its 2016 population of 1,388. With a land area of 445,269.81 km^{2} (171,919.63 sq mi), it had a population density of 0.0034/km^{2} (0.0087/sq mi) in 2021.

== Communities ==
- Beaver Creek
- Burwash Landing
- Carcross
- Conrad
- Champagne Landing
- Destruction Bay
- Ibex Valley
- Johnsons Crossing
- Keno City
- Lansdowne
- Marsh Lake
- Mount Lorne
- Old Crow
- Pelly Crossing
- Ross River
- Stewart Crossing
- Tagish
- Two and One-Half Mile Village
- Two Mile Village
- Upper Liard

== See also ==
- List of communities in Yukon
- Unorganized Borough, Alaska, a similar area in the neighbouring US state of Alaska
