= Demographics of Yukon =

Demographics of Yukon, Canada

Yukon is the westernmost of Canada's three northern territories. Its capital is Whitehorse. People from Yukon are known as Yukoners (French: Yukonnais). Unlike in other Canadian provinces and territories, Statistics Canada uses the entire territory as a single at-large census division.

Population of Yukon: 40,232 (2021 Census)

- Percentage of Canadian population : 0.10%
- Population growth rate for 2007: +5.8%

== Population history ==
View chart definition.

Year	Population	Five-year % change	Ten-year % change	Rank among provinces and territories
1901	27,219	n/a	n/a	10
1911	8,512	n/a	-68.7	10
1921	4,157	n/a	-51.1	10
1931	4,230	n/a	1.8	11
1941	4,914	n/a	16.2	11
1951	9,096	n/a	85.1	12
1956	12,190	34.0	n/a	12
1961	14,628	20.0	60.8	12
1966	14,382	-1.7	18.0	12
1971	18,390	27.9	25.7	12
1976	21,835	18.7	51.8	12
1981	23,150	6.0	25.9	12
1986	23,505	1.5	7.6	12
1991	27,797	18.3	20.1	12
1996	30,766	10.7	30.9	12
2001	28,674	-6.8	3.2	12
2006	30,372	5.9	-1.3	12
2011	33,897	11.6	18.2	12
2016	35,874	5.8	13.6	13
2021	40,232	12.1	18.7	12

Source: Statistics Canada

== Population geography ==
=== Major communities ===
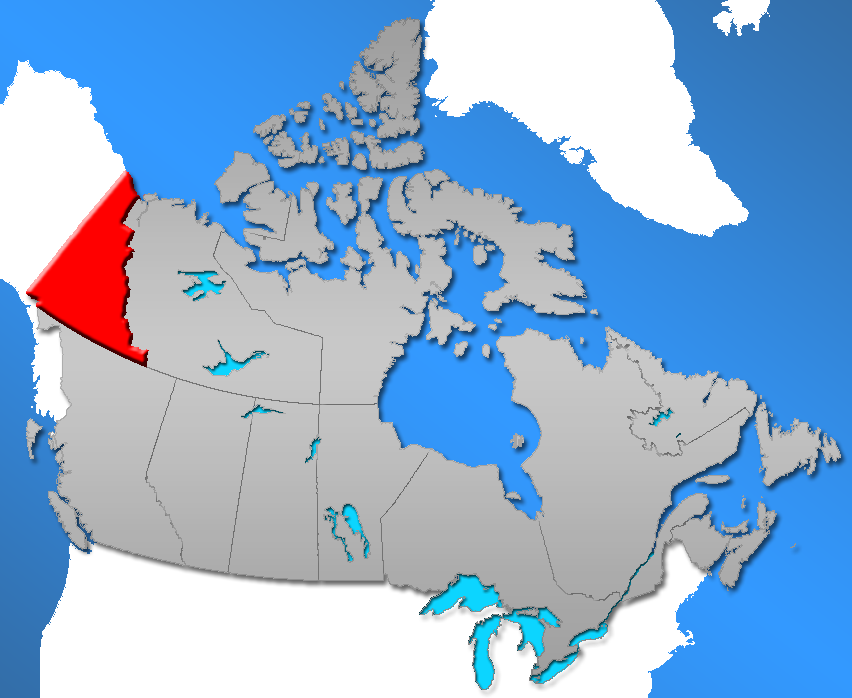
Demographics of Canada's provinces and territories

The largest communities by population
Community	2021	2016	2011	2006	2001
Whitehorse	28,201	25,085	23,276	20,461	19,058
Dawson City	1,577	1,375	1,319	1,327	1,251
Watson Lake	1,133	790	802	846	912
Haines Junction	688	613	593	589	531
Carmacks	588	493	503	425	431
Ibex Valley	523	411	346	376	315
Mount Lorne	468	437	408	370	379
Faro	440	348	344	341	313
Ross River	355	293	352	313	337
Carcross	317	301	289	280	152
Pelly Crossing	316	353	336	296	328
Tagish	311	249	391	222	206
Old Crow	236	221	245	253	299
Mayo	188	200	226	248	267

== Visible minorities and Indigenous peoples ==
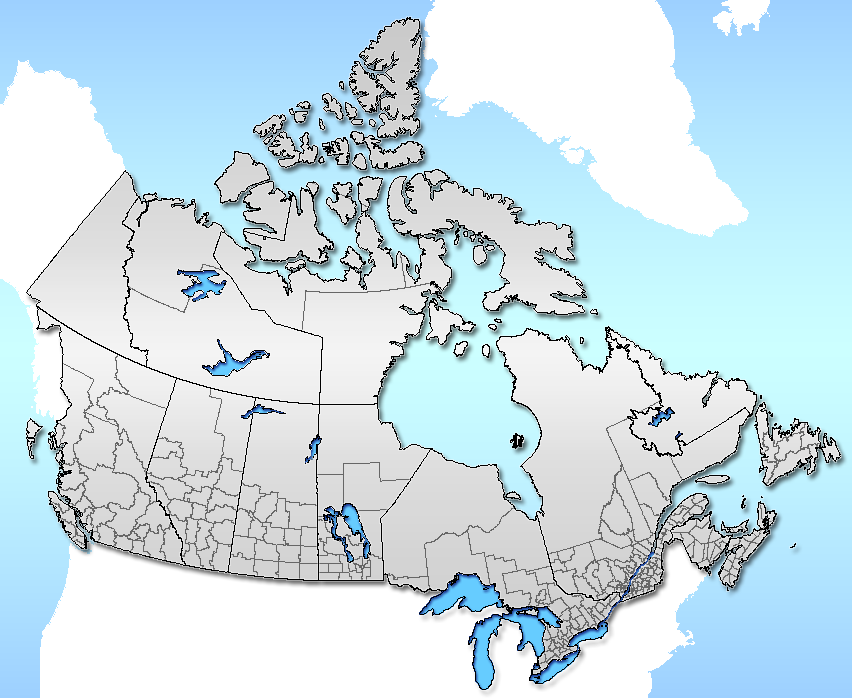
Census divisions by province and territory

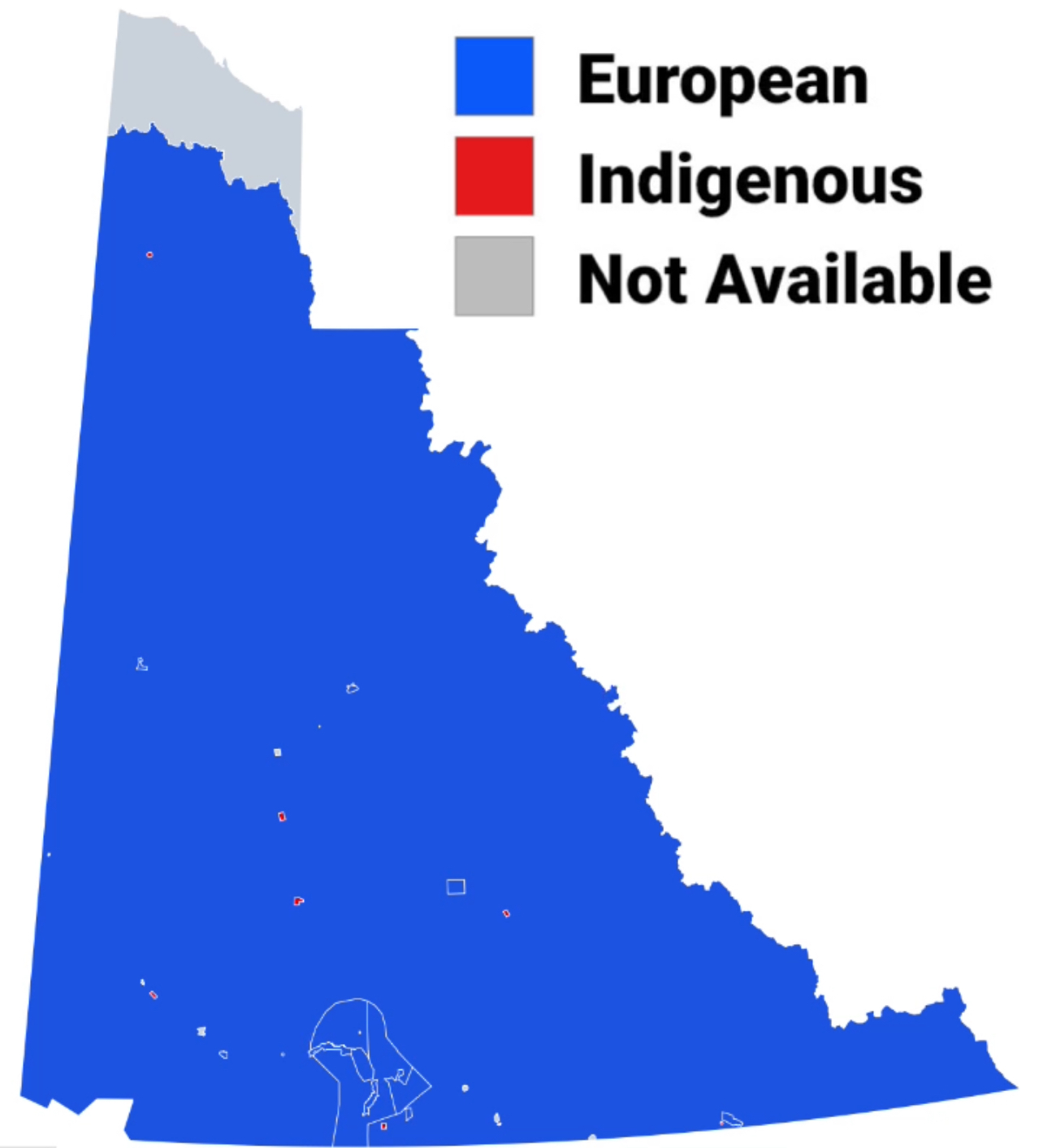
Largest panethnic groups in Yukon by census subdivision, 2021 census (Large blue area is Unorganized Yukon and is considered a census subdivision by Statistics Canada)

Visible minority & Indigenous population in Yukon (1986–2021)
Group	Population	2021 census		2016 census		2011 census		2006 census		2001 census		1996 census		1991 census		1986 census	
Group	Population	Pop.	%	Pop.	%	Pop.	%	Pop.	%	Pop.	%	Pop.	%	Pop.	%	Pop.	%
Non-Indigenous / non-visible minority group	British Isles (Note: Including multiple responses.) (Note: 1996-present census populations for British Isles and French origins may be undercounts, due to the creation of the "Canadian" ethnic origin category. All citizens of Canada are classified as "Canadians" as defined by Canada's nationality laws. However, "Canadian" as an ethnic group has since 1996 been added to census questionnaires for possible ancestry. "Canadian" was included as an example on the English questionnaire and "Canadien" as an example on the French questionnaire. "The majority of respondents to this selection are from the eastern part of the country that was first settled. Respondents generally are visibly European (Anglophones and Francophones), however no-longer self identify with their ethnic ancestral origins. This response is attributed to a multitude or generational distance from ancestral lineage. Source 1: Jack Jedwab (April 2008). "Our 'Cense' of Self: the 2006 Census saw 1.6 million 'Canadian' Canadians Return to British and French origins" (PDF). Association for Canadian Studies. p. 2. Archived from the original (PDF) on October 2, 2011. "Virtually all persons who reported "Canadian" in 1996 had English or French as a mother tongue, were born in Canada and had both parents born inside Canada. This suggests that many of these respondents were people whose families have been in this country for several generations. In effect the "new Canadians" were persons that previously reported either British or French origins. Moreover in 1996 some 55% of people with both parents born in Canada reported Canadian (alone or in combination with other origins). By contrast, only 4% of people with both parents born outside Canada reported Canadian. Thus the Canadian response did not appeal widely to either immigrants or their children. Most important however was that nearly half of those persons reporting Canadian origin in 1996 were in Quebec this represented a majority of the mother tongue francophone population[...]In the 2001 Census, 11.7 million people, or 39% of the total population, reported Canadian as their ethnic origin, either alone or in combination with other origins. Some 4.9 million Quebecers out of 7.1 million individuals reported Canadian or "Canadien" thus accounting for nearly seven in ten persons (nearly eighty percent of francophones in Quebec)." Source 2: Don Kerr (2007). The Changing Face of Canada: Essential Readings in Population. Canadian Scholars' Press. pp. 313–317. ISBN 978-1-55130-322-2. Source 3: Jantzen (2006) Footnote 5: Note that Canadian and Canadien have been separated since the two terms mean different things. In English, it usually means someone whose family has been in Canada for multiple generations. In French it is referring to "Les Habitants", settlers of New France during the 17th and 18th centuries who earned their living primarily from agricultural labour. Source 4: Jantzen (2006): The reporting of French New World ancestries (Canadien, Québécois, and French-Canadian) is concentrated in the 4th+ generations; 79% of French-Canadian, 88% of Canadien and 90% of Québécois are in the 4th+generations category. Source 5: Jantzen (2005): According to Table 3, the 4th+ generations are highest because of a strong sense of belonging to their ethnic or cultural group among those respondents reporting the New World ancestries of Canadien and Québécois. Source 6: Jantzen (2006): For respondents of French and New World ancestries the pattern is different. Where generational data is available, it is possible to see that not all respondents reporting these ancestries report a high sense of belonging to their ethnic or cultural group. The high proportions are focused among those respondents that are in the 4th+ generations, and unlike with the British Isles example, the difference between the 2nd and 3rd generations to the 4th+ generation is more pronounced. Since these ancestries are concentrated in the 4th+ generations, their high proportions of sense of belonging to ethnic or cultural group push up the 4th+ generational results.)	18,045	45.59%	17,520	49.9%	17,405	52.24%	15,425	51.08%	13,740	48.18%	14,625	47.72%	16,600	60.03%	14,505	62.12%
Non-Indigenous / non-visible minority group	Western European	7,860	19.86%	7,690	21.9%	7,125	21.38%	6,710	22.22%	5,465	19.16%	6,000	19.58%	6,170	22.31%	4,610	19.74%
Non-Indigenous / non-visible minority group	French	5,270	13.31%	5,310	15.12%	4,500	13.51%	4,385	14.52%	3,855	13.52%	4,320	14.09%	4,085	14.77%	3,425	14.67%
Non-Indigenous / non-visible minority group	Eastern European	4,110	10.38%	4,495	12.8%	4,015	12.05%	3,450	11.43%	3,170	11.12%	3,130	10.21%	3,070	11.1%	2,355	10.09%
Non-Indigenous / non-visible minority group	Northern European	3,310	8.36%	3,335	9.5%	3,060	9.18%	2,730	9.04%	2,435	8.54%	2,560	8.35%	2,295	8.3%	1,790	7.67%
Non-Indigenous / non-visible minority group	Southern European	1,710	4.32%	1,490	4.24%	1,380	4.14%	1,230	4.07%	1,065	3.73%	995	3.25%	780	2.82%	790	3.38%
Non-Indigenous / non-visible minority group	European, n.i.e. & n.o.s.	1,140	2.88%	455	1.3%	370	1.11%	215	0.71%	200	0.7%	220	0.72%	285	1.03%	160	0.69%
Total non-Indigenous / non-visible minority population (Note: Single responses only unless otherwise specified.)		25,710	64.95%	23,910	68.1%	23,590	70.8%	21,395	70.86%	20,955	73.47%	23,645	77.15%	20,410	73.8%	17,750	76.02%
Indigenous (Note: Statistics Canada defines Indigenous identity as persons who identify with the Indigenous Peoples of Canada.) group	First Nations	6,935	17.52%	6,690	19.05%	6,590	19.78%	6,275	20.78%	5,600	19.64%	5,330	17.39%	5,870 (Note: Including multiple Indigenous responses.)	21.23%	4,710	20.17%
Indigenous group	Métis	1,285	3.25%	1,015	2.89%	845	2.54%	800	2.65%	535	1.88%	550	1.79%	565	2.04%	175	0.75%
Indigenous group	Inuk (Inuit)	260	0.66%	225	0.64%	180	0.54%	255	0.84%	145	0.51%	95	0.31%	170	0.61%	60	0.26%
Indigenous group	Multiple Indigenous responses	190	0.48%	160	0.46%	25	0.08%	50	0.17%	100	0.35%	25	0.08%	—N/a	—N/a	60	0.26%
Indigenous group	Indigenous responses, n.i.e.	140	0.35%	105	0.3%	75	0.23%	190	0.63%	165	0.58%	—N/a	—N/a	—N/a	—N/a	—N/a	—N/a
Total Indigenous population		8,810	22.26%	8,195	23.34%	7,705	23.12%	7,580	25.1%	6,540	22.93%	6,005	19.59%	6,480	23.43%	5,010	21.46%
Visible minority (Note: Statistics Canada defines visible minorities as defined in the Employment Equity Act which defines visible minorities as "persons, other than Aboriginal peoples, who are non-Caucasian in race or non-white in colour".) group	Filipino	1,945	4.91%	1,190	3.39%	675	2.03%	210	0.7%	235	0.82%	110	0.36%	45	0.16%	25	0.11%
Visible minority group	South Asian	1,035	2.61%	500	1.42%	360	1.08%	195	0.65%	210	0.74%	215	0.7%	95	0.34%	70	0.3%
Visible minority group	Chinese	645	1.63%	410	1.17%	400	1.2%	320	1.06%	225	0.79%	155	0.51%	170	0.61%	160	0.69%
Visible minority group	Black	560	1.41%	270	0.77%	95	0.29%	125	0.41%	115	0.4%	120	0.39%	175	0.63%	65	0.28%
Visible minority group	Latin American	240	0.61%	135	0.38%	105	0.32%	100	0.33%	45	0.16%	55	0.18%	30	0.11%	80	0.34%
Visible minority group	Japanese	175	0.44%	65	0.19%	80	0.24%	40	0.13%	35	0.12%	50	0.16%	90	0.33%	40	0.17%
Visible minority group	Southeast Asian	165	0.42%	180	0.51%	210	0.63%	145	0.48%	105	0.37%	200	0.65%	35	0.13%	55	0.24%
Visible minority group	Multiple visible minorities	145	0.37%	125	0.36%	30	0.09%	35	0.12%	15	0.05%	30	0.1%	30	0.11%	10	0.04%
Visible minority group	Korean	90	0.23%	75	0.21%	0	0%	10	0.03%	0	0%	0	0%	10	0.04%	10	0.04%
Visible minority group	West Asian	25	0.06%	35	0.1%	0	0%	0	0%	10	0.04%	—N/a	—N/a	—N/a	—N/a	—N/a	—N/a
Visible minority group	Visible minority, n.i.e.	25	0.06%	20	0.06%	35	0.11%	10	0.03%	10	0.04%	10	0.03%	20	0.07%	10	0.04%
Visible minority group	Arab	20	0.05%	15	0.04%	0	0%	20	0.07%	15	0.05%	—N/a	—N/a	—N/a	—N/a	—N/a	—N/a
Visible minority group	Arab/West Asian	—N/a	—N/a	—N/a	—N/a	—N/a	—N/a	—N/a	—N/a	—N/a	—N/a	50	0.16%	60	0.22%	70	0.3%
Total visible minority population		5,065	12.8%	3,005	8.56%	2,025	6.08%	1,220	4.04%	1,025	3.59%	1,000	3.26%	765	2.77%	590	2.53%
Total responses		39,585	98.39%	35,110	97.87%	33,320	98.3%	30,195	99.42%	28,520	99.46%	30,650	99.62%	27,655	99.49%	23,350	99.34%
Total population		40,232	100%	35,874	100%	33,897	100%	30,372	100%	28,674	100%	30,766	100%	27,797	100%	23,504	100%

Yukon to Canada Comparison (1996)
		Total population	Total aboriginal	First Nation	Métis	Inuit	Multiple	Other	Percentage of total
Yukon	Total	30,650	6,175	5,330	550	95	30	170	20.1%
	Male	15,810	2,965	2,850	260	40	10	80	18.7%
	Female	14,840	3,210	2,750	290	55	20	90	21.6%
Canada	Total	28,528,125	799,010	529,035	204,115	40,225	6,415	19,215	2.8%
	Male	14,046,880	390,870	258,330	101,435	20,180	3,175	7,750	2.8%
	Female	14,481,245	408,140	270,700	102,685	20,040	3,240	11,465	2.8%

Communities in order of percent of Indigenous population (1996)
Rk	Name	Total pop.	Indigenous pop.	Percent	Rk	Name	Total pop.	Indigenous pop.	Percent
1	Upper Liard	110	110	100%	12	Beaver Creek	130	60	46.1%
2	Two Mile Village	100	100	100%	13	Haines Junction	575	230	40.0%
3	Two and One-Half Mile Village	40	40	100%	14	Ibex Valley	320	90	28.2%
4	Old Crow	280	250	89.3%	15	Watson Lake	995	220	27.1%
5	Pelly Crossing	240	205	84.5%	16	Dawson City	1280	345	26.9%
6	Ross River	350	275	78.6%	17	Tagish	165	40	26.7%
7	Carcross	275	185	67.3%	18	"Unorganised"	1855	345	18.6%
8	Burwash Landing	60	40	66.7%	19	Whitehorse	20,960	2,775	13.2%
9	Teslin	305	195	63.9%	20	Mount Lorne	400	35	8.75%
10	Carmacks	465	295	63.4%	21	Faro	1260	80	6.34%
11	Mayo	320	200	62.5%	22	Stewart Crossing	45	0	0%

== Languages ==
The 2006 Canadian census showed a population of 30,372.
Of the 29,940 singular responses to the census question concerning 'mother tongue' the most commonly reported languages were:

1.	English	25,655	85.69%
2.	French	1,105	3.69%
3.	German	775	2.59%
4.	Athapaskan languages	650	2.17%
	Gwich'in	75	0.25%
	North Slavey	30	0.10%
5.	Chinese	260	0.87%
	Cantonese	85	0.28%
	Mandarin	70	0.23%
6.	Malayo-Polynesian languages	165	0.55%
	Tagalog	145	0.48%
7.	Dutch	140	0.47%
8.	Spanish	130	0.43%
9.	Vietnamese	105	0.35%
10.	Yugoslavian languages	95	0.32%
	Slovenian	45	0.15%
11=	Hungarian	80	0.27%
11=	Panjabi	80	0.27%
13.	Tlingit	70	0.23%
14=	Algonquian languages	55	0.18%
	Cree	50	0.17%
14=	Russian	55	0.18%
14=	Inuktitut	55	0.18%

There were also about 40 single-language responses for Ukrainian; 30 each for Czech and the Scandinavian languages; and about 25 single-language responses each for Italian and Japanese. In addition, there were also 130 responses of both English and a 'non-official language'; 10 of both French and a 'non-official language'; 110 of both English and French; and about 175 people who either did not respond to the question, or reported multiple non-official languages, or else gave some other unenumerated response. Yukon's official languages are English and French. (Figures shown are for the number of single language responses and the percentage of total single-language responses.)

== Religion ==
The Majority of Christians in Yukon are Anglicans and Catholics, with a small number of Presbyterians and members of the United Church of Canada.

Religious groups in Yukon (1981−2021)
Religious group	2021 Canadian census		2011 Canadian census		2001 Canadian census		1991 Canadian census		1981 Canadian census	
Religious group	Pop.	%	Pop.	%	Pop.	%	Pop.	%	Pop.	%
Irreligion	23,640	59.71%	16,635	49.92%	11,010	38.6%	9,475	34.26%	4,680	20.28%
Christianity	13,860	35.01%	15,375	46.14%	16,655	58.39%	17,560	63.5%	18,100	78.44%
Sikhism	380	0.96%	90	0.27%	100	0.35%	40	0.14%	45	0.2%
Indigenous spirituality	325	0.82%	395	1.19%	185	0.65%	180	0.65%	10	0.04%
Hinduism	265	0.67%	165	0.5%	10	0.04%	15	0.05%	0	0%
Buddhism	260	0.66%	290	0.87%	130	0.46%	40	0.14%	75	0.33%
Islam	185	0.47%	40	0.12%	55	0.19%	35	0.13%	5	0.02%
Judaism	70	0.18%	20	0.06%	35	0.12%	45	0.16%	20	0.09%
Other	600	1.52%	300	0.9%	330	1.16%	265	0.96%	140	0.61%
Total responses	39,590	98.4%	33,320	98.3%	28,525	99.48%	27,655	99.49%	23,075	99.68%
Total population	40,232	100%	33,897	100%	28,674	100%	27,797	100%	23,150	100%

== Migration ==
=== Immigration ===
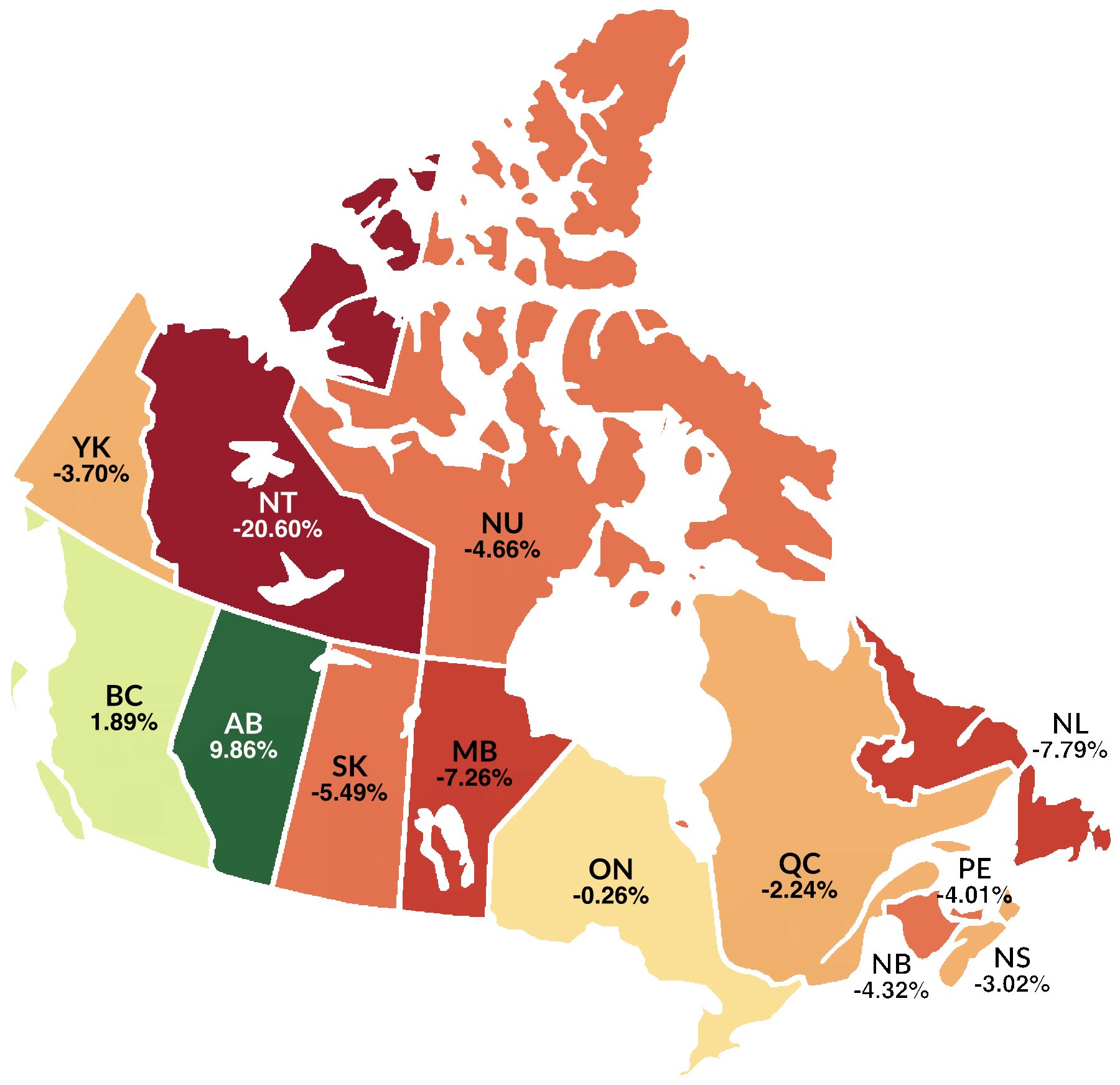
Net cumulative interprovincial migration per Province from 1997 to 2017, as a share of population of each Provinces

Yukon Immigration Statistics
Year	Immigrant percentage	Immigrant population	Total population
1901	70%	19,056	27,219
1911	54.8%	4,662	8,512
1921	37.5%	1,557	4,157
1931	37.2%	1,572	4,230
1941	29%	1,427	4,914
1951	17.9%	1,630	9,096
1961	18.6%	2,714	14,628
1971	13.8%	2,545	18,385

The 2021 census reported that immigrants (individuals born outside Canada) comprise 5,385 persons or 13.6 percent of the total population of Yukon.

Immigrants in Yukon by country of birth
Country of birth	2021 census		2016 census		2011 census		2006 census		2001 census		1996 census		1991 census		1986 census		1981 census		1971 census		1961 census		1951 census		1941 census	
Country of birth	Pop.	%	Pop.	%	Pop.	%	Pop.	%	Pop.	%	Pop.	%	Pop.	%	Pop.	%	Pop.	%	Pop.	%	Pop.	%	Pop.	%	Pop.	%
Philippines	1,405	26.1%	1,010	22.9%	555	14.8%	160	5.3%	155	5.1%	80	2.5%	30	1%	30	1.1%	15	0.5%	—N/a	—N/a	—N/a	—N/a	—N/a	—N/a	—N/a	—N/a
United States	530	9.8%	555	12.6%	495	13.2%	600	20%	580	19.2%	715	22.4%	730	24.6%	665	24.9%	660	22.9%	430	16.9%	359	13.2%	391	24%	367	25.7%
United Kingdom	525	9.7%	515	11.7%	595	15.8%	550	18.3%	550	18.2%	660	20.7%	785	26.5%	735	27.5%	785	27.2%	735	28.9%	630	23.2%	562	34.5%	391	27.4%
Germany & Austria	495 (Note: Germany: 470 / Austria: 25)	9.2%	475 (Note: Germany: 440 / Austria: 35)	10.8%	430 (Note: Germany: 410 / Austria: 20)	11.5%	440 (Note: Germany: 400 / Austria: 40)	14.6%	465 (Note: Germany: 400 / Austria: 65)	15.4%	425 (Note: Germany: 395 / Austria: 30)	13.3%	410 (Note: Germany: 370 / Austria: 40)	13.8%	285 (Note: Germany: 230 / Austria: 55)	10.7%	380 (Note: Germany: 330 / Austria: 50)	13.2%	380	14.9%	464	17.1%	59	3.6%	69	4.8%
India	360	6.7%	110	2.5%	100	2.7%	70	2.3%	90	3%	105	3.3%	25	0.8%	20	0.7%	35	1.2%	15	0.6%	0	0%	4	0.2%	2	0.1%
China & Taiwan	245 (Note: China: 230 / Taiwan: 15)	4.5%	240 (Note: China: 230 / Taiwan: 10)	5.4%	170 (Note: China: 105 / Taiwan: 65)	4.5%	100 (Note: China: 90 / Taiwan: 10)	3.3%	105 (Note: China: 105 / Taiwan: 0)	3.5%	50 (Note: China: 40 / Taiwan: 10)	1.6%	10 (Note: China: 10 / Taiwan: 0)	0.3%	45 (Note: China: 40 / Taiwan: 5)	1.7%	90 (Note: China: 45 / Taiwan: 45)	3.1%	40	1.6%	76	2.8%	28	1.7%	0	0%
France & Belgium	200 (Note: France: 170 / Belgium: 30)	3.7%	85 (Note: France: 75 / Belgium: 10)	1.9%	135 (Note: France: 110 / Belgium: 25)	3.6%	100 (Note: France: 75 / Belgium: 25)	3.3%	80 (Note: France: 70 / Belgium: 10)	2.6%	75 (Note: France: 65 / Belgium: 10)	2.4%	55 (Note: France: 40 / Belgium: 15)	1.9%	45 (Note: France: 35 / Belgium: 10)	1.7%	75 (Note: France: 65 / Belgium: 10)	2.6%	50	2%	35	1.3%	25	1.5%	28	2%
Australia & New Zealand	150	2.8%	90	2%	190	5.1%	60	2%	100	3.3%	70	2.2%	95	3.2%	80	3%	125	4.3%	95	3.7%	21	0.8%	10	0.6%	17	1.2%
Switzerland	130	2.4%	135	3.1%	90	2.4%	130	4.3%	105	3.5%	85	2.7%	50	1.7%	20	0.7%	50	1.7%	30	1.2%	24	0.9%	14	0.9%	12	0.8%
Netherlands	100	1.9%	135	3.1%	130	3.5%	110	3.7%	110	3.6%	135	4.2%	105	3.5%	135	5%	95	3.3%	125	4.9%	90	3.3%	22	1.3%	3	0.2%
Czech Republic & Slovakia	95	1.8%	60	1.4%	40	1.1%	50	1.7%	35	1.2%	55	1.7%	40	1.3%	35	1.3%	45	1.6%	35	1.4%	35	1.3%	28	1.7%	16	1.1%
South Korea	70	1.3%	55	1.2%	0	0%	10	0.3%	10	0.3%	0	0%	10	0.3%	10	0.4%	5	0.2%	—N/a	—N/a	—N/a	—N/a	—N/a	—N/a	—N/a	—N/a
Mexico	65	1.2%	40	0.9%	20	0.5%	0	0%	0	0%	0	0%	10	0.3%	5	0.2%	5	0.2%	—N/a	—N/a	—N/a	—N/a	—N/a	—N/a	—N/a	—N/a
Russia & Ukraine	60 (Note: Russia: 40 / Ukraine: 20)	1.1%	30 (Note: Russia: 30 / Ukraine: 0)	0.7%	35 (Note: Russia: 20 / Ukraine: 15)	0.9%	15 (Note: Russia: 15 / Ukraine: 0)	0.5%	15 (Note: Russia: 15 / Ukraine: 0)	0.5%	10 (Note: Includes total persons born in all republics of the Soviet Union.)	0.3%	15	0.5%	30	1.1%	35	1.2%	30	1.2%	67	2.5%	44	2.7%	26	1.8%
Japan	60	1.1%	20	0.5%	25	0.7%	15	0.5%	10	0.3%	10	0.3%	0	0%	0	0%	10	0.3%	5	0.2%	11	0.4%	9	0.6%	18	1.3%
Scandinavia (Note: Includes Denmark, Finland, Iceland, Norway and Sweden.)	55	1%	65	1.5%	0	0%	55	1.8%	60	2%	100	3.1%	70	2.4%	125	4.7%	75	2.6%	145	5.7%	273	10.1%	230	14.1%	286	20%
Pakistan	55	1%	25	0.6%	0	0%	0	0%	0	0%	0	0%	0	0%	5	0.2%	15	0.5%	5	0.2%	—N/a	—N/a	—N/a	—N/a	—N/a	—N/a
Jamaica & Trinidad and Tobago	50 (Note: Jamaica: 40 / Trinidad and Tobago: 10)	0.9%	25 (Note: Jamaica: 15 / Trinidad and Tobago: 10)	0.6%	0	0%	20 (Note: Jamaica: 10 / Trinidad and Tobago: 10)	0.7%	55 (Note: Jamaica: 45 / Trinidad and Tobago: 10)	1.8%	10 (Note: Jamaica: 10 / Trinidad and Tobago: 0)	0.3%	35 (Note: Jamaica: 35 / Trinidad and Tobago: 0)	1.2%	20 (Note: Jamaica: 15 / Trinidad and Tobago: 5)	0.7%	20	0.7%	10	0.4%	6 (Note: All individuals born in the British West Indies.)	0.2%	3	0.2%	1	0.1%
Nigeria & Ghana	45 (Note: Nigeria: 30 / Ghana: 15)	0.8%	15 (Note: Nigeria: 15 / Ghana: 0)	0.3%	0	0%	10 (Note: Nigeria: 10 / Ghana: 0)	0.3%	10 (Note: Nigeria: 10 / Ghana: 0)	0.3%	10 (Note: Nigeria: 10 / Ghana: 0)	0.3%	0	0%	5	0.2%	0	0%	—N/a	—N/a	—N/a	—N/a	—N/a	—N/a	—N/a	—N/a
Ireland	40	0.7%	35	0.8%	60	1.6%	30	1%	45	1.5%	80	2.5%	45	1.5%	20	0.7%	20	0.7%	45	1.8%	98	3.6%	67	4.1%	56	3.9%
Vietnam	40	0.7%	60	1.4%	75	2%	90	3%	30	1%	165	5.2%	65	2.2%	55	2.1%	15	0.5%	—N/a	—N/a	—N/a	—N/a	—N/a	—N/a	—N/a	—N/a
Poland	35	0.6%	30	0.7%	115	3.1%	25	0.8%	10	0.3%	10	0.3%	20	0.7%	25	0.9%	65	2.3%	50	2%	84	3.1%	63	3.9%	12	0.8%
Chile	30	0.6%	10	0.2%	25	0.7%	10	0.3%	30	1%	10	0.3%	0	0%	5	0.2%	0	0%	—N/a	—N/a	—N/a	—N/a	—N/a	—N/a	—N/a	—N/a
Romania	30	0.6%	15	0.3%	0	0%	0	0%	20	0.7%	10	0.3%	0	0%	0	0%	20	0.7%	5	0.2%	10	0.4%	1	0.1%	3	0.2%
Hong Kong	30	0.6%	10	0.2%	10	0.3%	15	0.5%	10	0.3%	20	0.6%	10	0.3%	15	0.6%	40	1.4%	—N/a	—N/a	—N/a	—N/a	—N/a	—N/a	—N/a	—N/a
Former Yugoslavia	25	0.5%	55	1.2%	55	1.5%	80	2.7%	20	0.7%	25	0.8%	15	0.5%	55	2.1%	45	1.6%	85	3.3%	91	3.4%	29	1.8%	62	4.3%
Hungary	25	0.5%	45	1%	35	0.9%	50	1.7%	55	1.8%	80	2.5%	90	3%	35	1.3%	75	2.6%	75	2.9%	147	5.4%	6	0.4%	7	0.5%
Fiji	25	0.5%	15	0.3%	40	1.1%	10	0.3%	30	1%	10	0.3%	15	0.5%	5	0.2%	0	0%	0	0%	—N/a	—N/a	—N/a	—N/a	—N/a	—N/a
Thailand	25	0.5%	10	0.2%	20	0.5%	15	0.5%	20	0.7%	10	0.3%	10	0.3%	0	0%	—N/a	—N/a	—N/a	—N/a	—N/a	—N/a	—N/a	—N/a	—N/a	—N/a
Ethiopia & Eritrea	25 (Note: Ethiopia: 15 / Eritrea: 10)	0.5%	10 (Note: Ethiopia: 10 / Eritrea: 0)	0.2%	0	0%	0	0%	0	0%	0	0%	0	0%	0	0%	—N/a	—N/a	—N/a	—N/a	—N/a	—N/a	—N/a	—N/a	—N/a	—N/a
Barbados	20	0.4%	0	0%	0	0%	0	0%	0	0%	0	0%	0	0%	0	0%	0	0%	—N/a	—N/a	—N/a	—N/a	—N/a	—N/a	—N/a	—N/a
Spain	20	0.4%	0	0%	0	0%	0	0%	0	0%	0	0%	0	0%	0	0%	5	0.2%	5	0.2%	—N/a	—N/a	—N/a	—N/a	0	0%
Zimbabwe	20	0.4%	15	0.3%	10	0.3%	10	0.3%	0	0%	0	0%	—N/a	—N/a	—N/a	—N/a	—N/a	—N/a	—N/a	—N/a	—N/a	—N/a	—N/a	—N/a	—N/a	—N/a
South Africa	15	0.3%	50	1.1%	75	2%	35	1.2%	65	2.1%	25	0.8%	15	0.5%	10	0.4%	25	0.9%	—N/a	—N/a	14	0.5%	5	0.3%	3	0.2%
Somalia	15	0.3%	20	0.5%	0	0%	0	0%	0	0%	0	0%	10	0.3%	0	0%	—N/a	—N/a	—N/a	—N/a	—N/a	—N/a	—N/a	—N/a	—N/a	—N/a
Colombia	15	0.3%	15	0.3%	10	0.3%	10	0.3%	0	0%	15	0.5%	0	0%	0	0%	—N/a	—N/a	—N/a	—N/a	—N/a	—N/a	—N/a	—N/a	—N/a	—N/a
Kenya & Tanzania & Uganda	15 (Note: Kenya: POP / Tanzania: 0 / Uganda: 0)	0.3%	15 (Note: Kenya: POP / Tanzania: 0 / Uganda: 0)	0.3%	0	0%	0	0%	10 (Note: Kenya: 10 / Tanzania: 0 / Uganda: 0)	0.3%	10 (Note: Kenya: 10 / Tanzania: 0 / Uganda: 0)	0.3%	0	0%	0	0%	10	0.3%	—N/a	—N/a	—N/a	—N/a	—N/a	—N/a	—N/a	—N/a
Costa Rica	15	0.3%	10	0.2%	40	1.1%	15	0.5%	10	0.3%	0	0%	—N/a	—N/a	—N/a	—N/a	—N/a	—N/a	—N/a	—N/a	—N/a	—N/a	—N/a	—N/a	—N/a	—N/a
Sri Lanka	15	0.3%	10	0.2%	10	0.3%	15	0.5%	10	0.3%	0	0%	0	0%	5	0.2%	0	0%	—N/a	—N/a	—N/a	—N/a	—N/a	—N/a	—N/a	—N/a
Turkey	15	0.3%	0	0%	0	0%	0	0%	0	0%	10	0.3%	10	0.3%	0	0%	0	0%	—N/a	—N/a	—N/a	—N/a	—N/a	—N/a	0	0%
United Arab Emirates	15	0.3%	0	0%	0	0%	0	0%	0	0%	0	0%	—N/a	—N/a	—N/a	—N/a	—N/a	—N/a	—N/a	—N/a	—N/a	—N/a	—N/a	—N/a	—N/a	—N/a
Italy	10	0.2%	35	0.8%	20	0.5%	15	0.5%	20	0.7%	20	0.6%	40	1.3%	30	1.1%	30	1%	65	2.6%	137	5%	16	1%	20	1.4%
Iran	10	0.2%	15	0.3%	10	0.3%	10	0.3%	25	0.8%	30	0.9%	10	0.3%	15	0.6%	5	0.2%	—N/a	—N/a	—N/a	—N/a	—N/a	—N/a	—N/a	—N/a
Morocco	10	0.2%	15	0.3%	0	0%	0	0%	0	0%	0	0%	0	0%	0	0%	0	0%	—N/a	—N/a	—N/a	—N/a	—N/a	—N/a	—N/a	—N/a
Greece	10	0.2%	10	0.2%	10	0.3%	10	0.3%	10	0.3%	10	0.3%	10	0.3%	20	0.7%	10	0.3%	20	0.8%	7	0.3%	1	0.1%	5	0.4%
Portugal	10	0.2%	10	0.2%	10	0.3%	10	0.3%	10	0.3%	10	0.3%	20	0.7%	20	0.7%	0	0%	10	0.4%	—N/a	—N/a	—N/a	—N/a	—N/a	—N/a
Cuba	10	0.2%	10	0.2%	0	0%	0	0%	10	0.3%	0	0%	—N/a	—N/a	—N/a	—N/a	—N/a	—N/a	—N/a	—N/a	—N/a	—N/a	—N/a	—N/a	—N/a	—N/a
Indonesia	10	0.2%	10	0.2%	0	0%	0	0%	0	0%	0	0%	0	0%	5	0.2%	—N/a	—N/a	—N/a	—N/a	—N/a	—N/a	—N/a	—N/a	—N/a	—N/a
Egypt	10	0.2%	0	0%	0	0%	10	0.3%	10	0.3%	0	0%	0	0%	0	0%	0	0%	—N/a	—N/a	—N/a	—N/a	—N/a	—N/a	—N/a	—N/a
Brazil	10	0.2%	0	0%	0	0%	0	0%	0	0%	0	0%	0	0%	5	0.2%	10	0.3%	—N/a	—N/a	—N/a	—N/a	—N/a	—N/a	—N/a	—N/a
Total immigrants	5,385	13.6%	4,415	12.6%	3,755	11.3%	3,005	10%	3,025	10.6%	3,190	10.4%	2,965	10.7%	2,675	11.5%	2,885	12.5%	2,545	13.8%	2,714	18.6%	1,630	17.9%	1,427	29%
Total responses	39,590	98.4%	35,110	97.9%	33,320	98.3%	30,190	99.4%	28,525	99.5%	30,655	99.6%	27,660	99.5%	23,360	99.4%	23,070	99.6%	18,390	100%	14,628	100%	9,096	100%	4,914	100%
Total population	40,232	100%	35,874	100%	33,897	100%	30,372	100%	28,674	100%	30,766	100%	27,797	100%	23,504	100%	23,153	100%	18,388	100%	14,628	100%	9,096	100%	4,914	100%

=== Recent immigration ===
The 2021 Canadian census counted a total of 1,125 people who immigrated to Yukon between 2016 and 2021.

Recent immigrants to Yukon by Country of birth (2016 to 2021)
Country of Birth	Population	% recent immigrants
India	255	22.7%
Philippines	230	20.4%
Germany	75	6.7%
United Kingdom	50	4.4%
France	45	4%
United States	40	3.6%
Japan	40	3.6%
Mexico	35	3.1%
China	30	2.7%
South Korea	25	2.2%
Australia	25	2.2%
Barbados	20	1.8%
Spain	20	1.8%
Pakistan	20	1.8%
Jamaica	15	1.3%
Netherlands	15	1.3%
Switzerland	15	1.3%
Costa Rica	10	0.9%
Peru	10	0.9%
Belgium	10	0.9%
Poland	10	0.9%
Ireland	10	0.9%
Nigeria	10	0.9%
Zimbabwe	10	0.9%
South Africa	10	0.9%
Total recent immigrants	1,125	100%

=== Internal migration ===
A total of 7,400 people moved to Yukon from other parts of Canada between 1996 and 2006 while 10,505 people moved in the opposite direction. These movements resulted in a net influx of 230 from the Northwest Territories; and a net outmigration of 2,505 to Alberta, 915 to British Columbia and 115 to New Brunswick. There was a net influx of 120 francophones from Quebec during this period. All net inter-provincial and official minority movements of more than 100 persons are given.

== See also ==
- Demographics of Canada
