= List of radio stations in Yukon =

The following is a list of radio stations in the Canadian territory of Yukon, as of 2024.

Call sign	Frequency	City of licence	Owner	Format
CBDM	690 AM	Beaver Creek	CBC Radio One	public news/talk
VF2359	105.5 FM	Beaver Creek	Yukon Department of Infrastructure	tourist information
VF2024	90.5 FM	Burwash Landing	Northern Native Broadcasting, Yukon	First Nations community radio
VF2039	90.5 FM	Carcross	Northern Native Broadcasting, Yukon	First Nations community radio
CIKO-FM	97.5 FM	Carcross	Carcross Community School	high school radio
VF2360	105.5 FM	Carcross	Yukon Department of Infrastructure	tourist information
CBQF	990 AM	Carmacks	CBC Radio One	public news/talk
CHCK-FM	90.5 FM	Carmacks	Northern Native Broadcasting, Yukon	First Nations community radio
VF2267	98.7 FM	Carmacks	Klondike Broadcasting	hot adult contemporary
CBDN	560 AM	Dawson City	CBC Radio One	public news/talk
VF2049	90.5 FM	Dawson City	Northern Native Broadcasting, Yukon	First Nations community radio
CBDN-FM	104.9 FM	Dawson City	CBC Music	public music
VF2412	105.5 FM	Dawson City	Yukon Department of Infrastructure	tourist information
CFYT-FM	106.9 FM	Dawson City	Dawson City Community Radio Society	community radio
CJBD-FM	94.7 FM	Destruction Bay	Yukon Department of Infrastructure	tourist information
VF2147	98.1 FM	Destruction Bay	Northern Native Broadcasting, Yukon	First Nations community radio
CBDL-FM	105.1 FM	Destruction Bay/Burwash Landing	CBC Radio One	public news/talk
VF2049	90.5 FM	Faro	Northern Native Broadcasting, Yukon	First Nations community radio
VF2063	98.7 FM	Faro	Klondike Broadcasting	hot adult contemporary
CBQK-FM	105.1 FM	Faro	CBC Radio One	public news/talk
VF2259	106.1 FM	Ferry Hill	Yukon Department of Infrastructure	public news/talk (CBC Radio One rebroadcaster)
CHHJ-FM	90.5 FM	Haines Junction	Northern Native Broadcasting, Yukon	First Nations community radio
VF2269	98.7 FM	Haines Junction	Klondike Broadcasting	hot adult contemporary
CBDF-FM	103.5 FM	Haines Junction	CBC Radio One	public news/talk
VF2161	106.1 FM	Haines Junction	Yukon Department of Infrastructure	
VF2211	93.3 FM	Horse Camp Hill	Yukon Department of Infrastructure	public news/talk (CBC Radio One rebroadcaster)
CHON-FM-3	90.5 FM	Johnson’s Crossing	Northern Native Broadcasting, Yukon	First Nations community radio
VF2126	90.5 FM	Keno City	Northern Native Broadcasting, Yukon	First Nations community radio
VF????	105.1 FM	Keno City	CBC Radio One	public news/talk
CFSD-FM	93.3 FM	King Solomon's Dome	Dawson City Community Radio Society	community radio
CHON-FM-1	90.5 FM	Klukshu	Northern Native Broadcasting, Yukon	First Nations community radio
VF2028	90.5 FM	Mayo	Northern Native Broadcasting, Yukon	First Nations community radio
VF2268	98.7 FM	Mayo	Klondike Broadcasting	hot adult contemporary
CBDC-FM	104.9 FM	Mayo	CBC Radio One	public news/talk
VF2148	98.7 FM	Mayo Road	Northern Native Broadcasting, Yukon	First Nations community radio
CKZV-FM	103.1 FM	Mount Jubilee	CBC Radio One	public news/talk (NEW approved June 3, 2020)
CKRF-FM	88.9 FM	Old Crow	Klondike Broadcasting	hot adult contemporary
CHOL-FM	90.5 FM	Old Crow	Northern Native Broadcasting, Yukon	First Nations community radio
VF2036	100.1 FM	Old Crow	CBC Radio One	public news/talk
CHPE-FM	90.5 FM	Pelly Crossing	Northern Native Broadcasting, Yukon	First Nations community radio
VF2041	100.1 FM	Pelly Crossing	CBC Radio One	public news/talk
CBQJ	990 AM	Ross River	CBC Radio One	public news/talk
VF2035	90.5 FM	Ross River	Northern Native Broadcasting, Yukon	First Nations community radio
VF2363	93.3 FM	Sourdough	Yukon Department of Infrastructure	tourist information
VF2127	90.5 FM	Stewart Crossing	Northern Native Broadcasting, Yukon	First Nations community radio
VF2358	93.3 FM	Stewart Crossing	Yukon Department of Infrastructure	tourist information
VF2048	100.9 FM	Stewart Crossing	CBC Radio One	public news/talk
VF2128	90.5 FM	Tagish	Northern Native Broadcasting, Yukon	First Nations community radio
CFET-FM	106.7 FM	Tagish	Robert G. Hopkins	community radio
CHON-FM-2	90.5 FM	Takhini River Subdivision	Northern Native Broadcasting, Yukon	First Nations community radio
CBDK	940 AM	Teslin	CBC Radio One	public news/talk
CHTE-FM	90.5 FM	Teslin	Northern Native Broadcasting, Yukon	First Nations community radio
VF2270	98.7 FM	Teslin	Klondike Broadcasting	hot adult contemporary
VF2038	98.1 FM	Upper Liard	Northern Native Broadcasting, Yukon	First Nations community radio
VF2330	99.9 FM	Upper Liard	Liard First Nation FM Society	First Nations community radio
CBDB	990 AM	Watson Lake	CBC Radio One	public news/talk
VF2027	90.5 FM	Watson Lake	Northern Native Broadcasting, Yukon	First Nations community radio
VF2143	98.7 FM	Watson Lake	Klondike Broadcasting	hot adult contemporary
CHWA-FM	102.1 FM	Watson Lake	Liard First Nation FM Society	First Nations community radio
CJUC-FM	92.5 FM	Whitehorse	Utilities Consumers Group	community radio
CHLA-FM	93.5 FM	Whitehorse	Yukon Legislative Assembly	legislature broadcaster (occasional)
CFWH-FM	94.5 FM	Whitehorse	CBC Radio One	public news/talk
CFWH-FM-1	95.3 FM	Whitehorse	CBC Radio One	public news/talk
CKRW-FM	96.1 FM	Whitehorse	Klondike Broadcasting	hot adult contemporary
CHON-FM	98.1 FM	Whitehorse	Northern Native Broadcasting, Yukon	First Nations community radio
VF2356	100.3 FM	Whitehorse (Golden Horn)	Whitehorse Chamber of Commerce	tourist information
VF2357	100.3 FM	Whitehorse (Mayors House)	Whitehorse Chamber of Commerce	tourist information
CIAY-FM	100.7 FM	Whitehorse	Bethany Pentecostal Tabernacle	Christian radio
CFWY-FM	102.1 FM	Whitehorse	Association Franco-Yukonnais	community-owned rebroadcaster of CBUF-FM (Ici Radio-Canada Première) Vancouver
CBU-FM-8	104.5 FM	Whitehorse	CBC Music	public music

== See also ==
- Lists of radio stations in North and Central America
