= Two Mile and Two and One-Half Mile Village =

- Designated place (interim protected land)
- Location within Canada
- Coordinates: 60.131°N 128.828°W
- Country: Canada
- Territory: Yukon

Area
  - Land: 1.24 km^{2} (0.48 sq mi)

Population (2021)
  - Total: 162
- Time zone: UTC−07:00 (MST)
- Highways: Robert Campbell Highway (Highway 4)

Two Mile and Two and One-Half Mile Village is a designated place within the Town of Watson Lake in southeast Yukon, Canada that includes the Indian settlements of Two Mile Village and Two and One-Half Mile Village.

== History ==
Two Mile Village and Two and One-Half Mile Village were both separate Indian settlements prior to forming Two Mile and Two and One-Half Mile Village on January 2, 2011. It was subsequently annexed by the Town of Watson Lake on January 2, 2016.

== Geography ==
Two Mile and Two and One-Half Mile Village is within the Town of Watson Lake on the Robert Campbell Highway (Highway 4) in southeast Yukon.

== Demographics ==
Federal census population history of Two Mile and Two and One-Half Mile Village
Year	Pop.	±%
2011	233	—
2016	188	−19.3%
2021	162	−13.8%
Source: Statistics Canada

In the 2021 Census of Population conducted by Statistics Canada, Two Mile and Two and One-Half Mile Village had a population of 162 living in 73 of its 88 total private dwellings, a change of −13.8% from its 2016 population of 188. With a land area of 1.24 km^{2} (0.48 sq mi), it had a population density of 130.6/km^{2} (338.4/sq mi) in 2021.

== See also ==
- List of communities in Yukon
