= List of ghost towns in Yukon =

The following is a list of known abandoned communities in Yukon, Canada.

- Canyon City
- Clinton Creek
- Elsa
- Fortymile
- Grand Forks
- Paris
- Silver City
- Snag
- Yost

== See also ==
- List of communities in Yukon
