= CHON-FM =

Radio station in Whitehorse, Yukon, Canada

- Whitehorse, Yukon; Canada
- Frequency: 98.1 MHz

Programming
- Language: English
- Format: First nations community radio

Ownership
- Operator: Northern Native Broadcasting, Yukon

History
- First air date: 1984
- Former frequencies: 88.9 MHz

Technical information
- Class: B
- ERP: 4.261 kW
- HAAT: 333 metres (1,093 ft)
- Transmitter coordinates: 60.6578°N 134.885°W

Links
- Webcast: Listen Live
- Website: chonfm.com

CHON-FM is a Canadian radio station, owned by Northern Native Broadcasting, Yukon which broadcasts at 98.1 FM in Whitehorse, Yukon. A community radio station with a variety of music and information programs for the First Nations population, the radio station serves much of the Yukon, as well as several border communities in British Columbia and the Northwest Territories, through a series of rebroadcasters.

The station was licensed in 1984 to broadcast on 88.9 MHz in Whitehorse and moved to its current frequency in 1986.

== Rebroadcasters ==
CHON has the following rebroadcasters:

=== British Columbia ===
Rebroadcasters of CHON-FM
City of licence	Identifier	Frequency	Power	Class	RECNet	CRTC Decision
Atlin	VF2306	98.1 MHz	3 watts	VLP	Query	
Dease Lake	CHON-FM-4	90.5 MHz	9 watts	VLP	Query	2012-646
Good Hope Lake	VF2353	98.1 MHz	10 watts	VLP	Query	
Lower Post	VF2311	98.1 MHz	3 watts	VLP	Query	

=== Northwest Territories ===
Rebroadcasters of CHON-FM
City of licence	Identifier	Frequency	Power	Class	RECNet	CRTC Decision
Tsiigehtchic	VF2498	90.5 MHz	10 watts	VLP	Query	2006-21

=== Yukon ===
Rebroadcasters of CHON-FM
City of licence	Identifier	Frequency	Power	Class	RECNet	CRTC Decision
Burwash Landing	VF2024	90.5 MHz	7 (peak), 3 (avg) watts	LP	Query	92-300
Carcross	VF2039	90.5 MHz	7 (peak), 3 (avg) watts	VLP	Query	86-1140
Carmacks	CHCK-FM	90.5 MHz	7 (peak), 3 (avg) watts	VLP	Query	85-823
Dawson City	VF2049	90.5 MHz	10 watts	VLP	Query	88-19
Destruction Bay	VF2147	98.1 MHz	10 (peak), 5 (avg) watts	VLP	Query	92-81
Faro	VF2414	90.5 MHz	1 watt	VLP	Query	2003-121
Haines Junction	CHHJ-FM	90.5 MHz	7 (peak), 3 (avg) watts	VLP	Query	
Johnson's Crossing	CHON-FM-3	90.5 MHz	45 (peak), 25 (avg) watts	LP	Query	2012-136
Keno City	VF2126	90.5 MHz	1 watt	VLP	Query	91-22494-824
Klukshu	CHON-FM-1	90.5 MHz	10 watts	VLP	Query	2012-158
Mayo	VF2028	90.5 MHz	10 watts	VLP	Query	
Mayo Road	VF2148	98.7 MHz	10 watts	VLP	Query	
Old Crow	CHOL-FM	90.5 MHz	7 (peak), 3 (avg) watts	VLP	Query	
Pelly Crossing	CHPE-FM	90.5 MHz	10 (peak), 5 (avg) watts	VLP	Query	2001-615
Ross River	VF2035	90.5 MHz	7 (peak), 3 (avg) watts	VLP	Query	86-514
Stewart Crossing	VF2127	90.5 MHz	1 watt	VLP	Query	
Tagish	VF2128	90.5 MHz	1 watt	VLP	Query	
Takhini River Subdivision	CHON-FM-2	90.5 MHz	10 watts	VLP	Query	2012-157
Teslin	CHTE-FM	90.5 MHz	7 (peak), 3 (avg) watts	VLP	Query	
Upper Liard	VF2038	98.1 MHz	1 watt	VLP	Query	94-808
Watson Lake	VF2027	90.5 MHz	10 watts	VLP	Query	86-51597-517
