= McQuesten =

McQuesten is a surname. Notable people with the surname include:

- Ida McQuesten (1869–1945), American politician
- Jack McQuesten (1836–1909), American pioneer explorer, trader, and prospector in Alaska and Yukon
- Mary Baker McQuesten (1849–1934), Victorian-era Canadian letter writer and activist
- Thomas McQuesten (1882–1948), politician in Ontario, Canada

== See also ==
- McQuesten Airport (TC LID: CFP4) near McQuesten, Yukon, Canada
- McQuesten, Yukon, an unincorporated community
- McQuistan
