= Teslin =

Teslin is the anglicized form of the name of the Deisleen Ḵwáan ("Big Sinew Tribe") of the Tlingit people, one of two ḵwáan that are today incorporated as the Teslin Tlingit Council government in the Yukon Territory of northern Canada. As a term it may also refer to:

Geography

- Teslin Lake, a lake spanning the British Columbia-Yukon border
- the Teslin River, a river feeding and draining Teslin Lake
- Little Teslin Lake, a lake near the Teslin River in Yukon, Canada
- the Teslin Plateau, a landform in the region of Teslin Lake and the Teslin River
- Teslin Mountain, a mountain in Yukon, Canada

Settlements

- Teslin, Yukon, a village in Yukon, Canada
- Teslin Lake, Yukon, an unincorporated area in Yukon, Canada
- Teslin River, Yukon, an unincorporated area in Yukon, Canada
- Little Teslin Lake, Yukon, an unincorporated area in Yukon, Canada
- Teslin Crossing, an unincorporated area in Yukon, Canada
- Teslin Lake Indian Reserve No. 7, an Indian Reserve of the Taku River Tlingit government in British Columbia
- Teslin Lake Indian Reserve No. 9, an Indian Reserve of the Taku River Tlingit government in British Columbia

Other

- Teslin Airport
- Teslin Water Aerodrome
- Teslin (material)

== See also ==
- Teslim
- Teslyn Barkman, Falkland Island journalist and politician
