= Scouting in Alaska =

- Alaska Council's Mount McKinley Explorer Trek

Scouting in Alaska has a long history, from the 1920s to the present day, serving thousands of youth in programs that suit the environment in which they live. Alaska shares a communal Scout history, only being broken into smaller councils in the 1960s.

== Early history (1920s-1950) ==
Scouting came to Alaska in the 1920s, and the Alaska Territorial Council was created in the 1930s.

== Recent history (1950–1990) ==
In 1955, the old Alaska Council was divided into two councils. The Southeastern Alaska Council is the southeastern panhandle with headquarters in Juneau. It has the distinction of having a higher percentage of city boys in scouting than any other council in the United States–almost 99 per cent. Only 24 councils have enrolled a higher percentage of all available boys than Western Alaska Council, which sprawls over the major portion of the new state with headquarters at Anchorage–more than 52 per cent of all boys are enrolled. https://blog.scoutingmagazine.org/2014/03/06/14-fascinating-facts-about-scouting-in-alaska-in-the-1950s-and-1960s/

== Boy Scouting in Alaska today ==
There are two Boy Scouts of America local councils in Alaska.

=== Great Alaska Council ===
Great Alaska Council (#610)
- Owner: Scouting America
- Headquarters: Anchorage, Alaska
- Country: United States
- Founded: 1934
- President: Timothy Breeden
- Commissioner: Curtiss Clifton
- Scout Executive/CEO: Samuel Giacalone
- Website scoutingalaska.org

The Western Alaska Council and Southeast Alaska Council merged to form the Great Alaska Council in January, 2006. The combined Supercouncil has 3,000 volunteers serving 16,000 youth. The Western Alaska Council was formed in 1954 from a part of the Seattle Council, which absorbed the Alaska Council in the same year.

Scouts in the Russian oblast of Magadan have a relationship with the Great Alaska Council.

==== Organization ====
- Bear Paw District (serves the Matanuska-Susitna Borough and Valdez)
- Denali District (serves Southern Anchorage and Girdwood)
- Eklutna District (serves Northern Anchorage, Chugiak, and Eagle River)
- Maritime District (formerly of Southeast Alaska Council, serves Juneau, Haines, Sitka, and Skagway)
- Totem District (formerly of Southeast Alaska Council, serves Petersburg, Wrangell, Ketchikan, Prince of Wales Island, and environs)
- Tustumena District (serves Kenai Peninsula, Cordova, Kodiak, and Western Alaska)

==== Order of the Arow ====
Nanuk Lodge was created in 1947, and celebrated its 75th anniversary in 2022. Nanuk Lodge #355 was established July 1, 1947, with the inception of the Alaska Council of the Boy Scouts of America, based out of the State Capital of Juneau. Initially the council was responsible for the entire State of Alaska. Nanuk Lodge #355 absorbed Kootz Lodge #523 when Western Alaska Council merged with the Southeast Alaska Council.

The Lodge Totem is the great Alaskan Polar Bear, which Inuit call "Nanook", the lodge name is a variation of that name. By 1957, scouting was developed enough in the Anchorage area to support a new council. The Western Alaska Area Council was formed on July 1, 1955, and retained the original lodge name. Southeast Alaska formed a new lodge, named Kootz, which merged into Nanuk Lodge in 2006, thus becoming the lodge of the Great Alaska Council. Nanuk Lodge is responsible for OA programs across 297,833 square miles, covering the Aleutian Islands, Western Alaska Coast, South-Central Alaska, and the Pan-Handle to the South-East.

=== Midnight Sun Council ===
Midnight Sun Council (#696)
- Owner: Scouting America
- Headquarters: Fairbanks, Alaska
- Country: United States
- Scout Executive/CEO: Stephen Smith
- Website midnightsunbsa.org

The Midnight Sun Council serves interior and northern Alaska; it is headquartered in Fairbanks.

==== Organization ====
- Tanana Valley District
- Bush District

==== Camps ====
- Lost Lake Scout Camp
- Northern Lights High Adventure

==== Order of the Arrow ====
Toontuk Lodge #549 was founded in 1961. The lodge is named after the barren ground caribou, which is known to the Yupik people of Western Alaska as Toontuk. Toontuk Lodge was recognized with the National Service Grant in 1997. The money was used to rehabilitate the waterfront at Lost Lake Scout Camp with sand and a lifeguard tower. In 2006, Toontuk Lodge celebrated its 45th anniversary. Among its projects that year, the Lodge gave the council a large amphitheater sited on Lost Lake at Lost Lake Camp.

== Girl Scouting in Alaska ==
As of October 2009, two Girl Scout councils exist in Alaska.

=== Farthest North Girl Scout Council ===
Farthest North Girl Scout Council
- Owner: GSUSA
- Headquarters: Fairbanks, Alaska
- Country: United States
- Website fairbanksgirlscouts.org

The Farthest North Girl Scout Council serves the largest geographical area of any of the more than 100 Girl Scout Councils in the United States, serving the area from the 63rd parallel north of the Alaska Range, more than 350,000 square miles (910,000 km^{2}). The council was started in 1925 by a handful of girls in Fairbanks, Alaska headed by Jessie Bloom. Girl Scouting expanded to rural Alaska in 1945 with the establishment of the first troop in Nome. Since English was not the predominantly spoken language, they learned the Girl Scout Promise in Yup'ik in addition to English.

=== Girl Scouts of Alaska ===
Girl Scouts of Alaska
- Owner: GSUSA
- Headquarters: Anchorage, Alaska
- Country: United States
- Website girlscoutsalaska.org

Girl Scouts of Alaska was formed on October 1, 2009, by the merger of Girl Scouts Susitna Council and Tongass Alaska Girl Scout Council and serves all of Alaska, south of the 63 parallel. Girl Scouts of Alaska is the proven leadership development program for girls in grades K-12. Girl Scouts provides a safe, inclusive environment for Alaska's diverse population of girls, regardless of income or socioeconomic background. With the help of adult volunteers, Girl Scouts of Alaska (GSAK) serves girls from Bethel to Ketchikan. GSAK is headquartered in Anchorage, with a field office in Juneau.

==== Camps ====
Camp Togowoods in Wasilla and Camp Singing Hills in Peters Creek.

== See also ==
- Scouting in British Columbia
- Scouting in Yukon
