= Ibex Valley =

Valley in Yukon, Canada

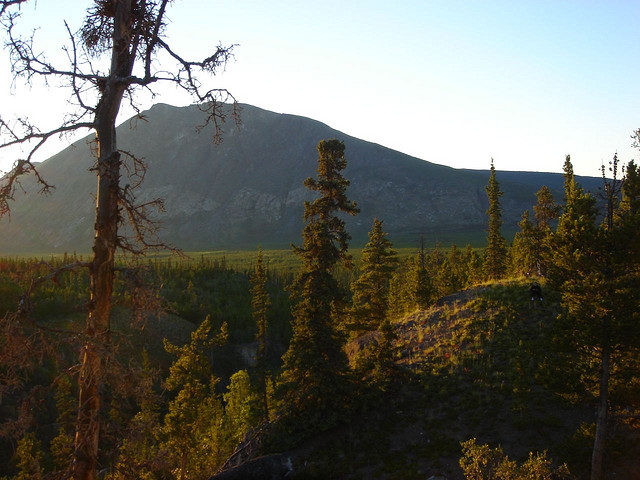
- A view of the Ibex Valley

- Location within Yukon
- Length: 30 km (18.6 mi) South - North and Southeast - Northwest
- Width: 5 km (3.1 mi)
- Depth: 500 m (1,640 ft)

Geography
- Coordinates: 60°43′06″N 135°23′07″W
- Topo map: NTS 105D
- Interactive map of Ibex Valley

The Ibex Valley (named for Ibex Mountain) is a valley approximately 16 kilometres (9.9 mi) west of the City of Whitehorse, Yukon, Canada. The valley and the surrounding area is governed by five elected councilors from the Ibex Valley Hamlet. The valley is rural with a mixture of farms and country residential. The population of the Hamlet in 2021 was 523.

The Ibex Valley is bounded by Ibex Mountain to the south; Mount Arkell and Mount Ingram to the west; Mount Sumanik and Mount Williams to the east.

== Description ==
The valley is generally undeveloped, with some recreational use trails. The vegetation consists of coniferous trees and grasslands typically found in the sub-alpine ecosystem. The southern (higher) portion of the valley runs from south to north for about 15 km, at which point the axis of the valley turns to the northwest. This southeast–northwest section of the valley has a much shallower slope and the valley floor is wider.

=== Surficial geology ===
Generally, near surface geology of the valley consists of fluvial and glaciofluvial deposits of sand, gravel and silt units in the bottom of the valley. The valley side slopes are made up of varying layers of colluvium and/or till moraines overlying bedrock. In some areas, the bedrock is exposed on the valley walls.

== Land use ==
As the valley is mostly undeveloped, the land use is primarily recreational. Some trails exist. The trails are typically used for hiking, mountain biking, bouldering, cross country skiing, snowmobiling and dog sledding.

== Foothills Pipeline/Alaska Pipeline Project ==
In 1982, a pipeline right of way was granted to Foothills Pipeline Ltd (now a wholly owned subsidiary of TransCanada Pipelines Limited) by the Northern Pipeline Agency. The proposed pipeline has undergone several name changes since the late-1970s and is now called the Alaska Pipeline Project. The right of way travels through a portion of the Ibex Valley between the Alaska Highway near the Mendenhall subdivision and the north end of Fish Lake.
