= Teslin Mountain =

Highest point
- Elevation: 1,953 m (6,407 ft)
- Prominence: 803 m (2,635 ft)
- Coordinates: 61°02′42″N 134°36′01″W

Geography
- Location: Yukon Territory, Canada
- Topo map: NTS 105E2 Teslin Mountain

Teslin Mountain, 1953 m (6407 ft), prominence: 803 m, is a mountain in the Yukon Territory, Canada, located 44 km NE of Whitehorse. Its name is derived from that of the Teslin River, which is named for the Desleen kwaan of the Inland Tlingit people.

== See also ==
- Teslin (disambiguation)
