= Teslin River, Yukon =

Coordinates: 60°29′00″N 133°18′25″W

Teslin River is an unincorporated area in the Yukon Territory, Canada, located on the west bank of the Teslin River at a crossing of that river on the Alaska Highway, about 40 km (25 mi) northwest of the Village of Teslin (Teslin Post), which is on the east shore of Teslin Lake as is the neighbouring community of Teslin Lake. The settlement of Johnsons Crossing is on the east bank at that point, while the lake and community of Little Teslin Lake is located farther along the highway about 10 km (6 mi) west.

== See also ==
- Teslin (disambiguation)
