= The International Hair Freezing Contest =

Canadian sculpted hair competition

The International Hair Freezing Contest is an annual sculpted hair competition held every February at a resort in the Takhini Hot Springs, Whitehorse, Yukon, Canada. The competition first started in 2011 as an extension of the Yukon Sourdough Rendezvous. Participants sit in a hot spring and sculpt their wet hair. After about a minute in the cold air, the hair freezes. The form of their hair at that time represents their contest entry.
