= Designated place =

Type of community or settlement identified by Statistics Canada

A designated place (DPL) is a type of community or settlement identified by Statistics Canada that does not meet the criteria used to define municipalities or population centres. DPLs are delineated every 5 years for the Canadian census as the statistical counterparts of incorporated places such as cities, towns, and villages.

Though lacking separate municipal government, DPLs otherwise physically resemble incorporated places. They are created by provincial or territorial governments for the purpose of providing data for settled concentrated populations that are identifiable by name but are not legally incorporated under the laws of the province/territory in which they are located. The boundaries of a DPL therefore have no legal status, and not all unincorporated communities are necessarily granted DPL status.

Some designated places may have a quasi-governmental status, such as a local services board in Ontario or an organized hamlet in Saskatchewan. Others may be formerly unincorporated settlements or formerly independent municipalities that have been merged into larger governments, and have retained DPL status in order to ensure statistical continuity with past censuses.

DPLs are similar to the function of census-designated places in the United States, but are defined differently. One significant difference is that Statistics Canada applies the designation to much smaller communities than does the United States Census Bureau.

Statistics Canada indexes designated places numerically, with each designated place referred to by a unique six-digit code, the first two digits of which are the Standard Geographical Classification code for the province or territory in which the place is located, an example being 590066 for Shawnigan Lake in British Columbia.

== Criteria ==
As of the 2016 census, Statistics Canada requires small communities or settlements to meet the following criteria in order to become a designated place:

- an area less than or equal to 10 km^{2} (3.9 mi^{2})
- "a boundary that respects the block structure from the previous census, where possible."

In 2006, the criteria required for a community to be defined as a designated place included:

- a minimum population of 100 and a maximum population of 1,000. The maximum population limit may be exceeded provided that the population density is less than 400 persons per square kilometre, which is the population density that defines a population centre.
- a population density of 150 persons or more per square kilometre
- an area less than or equal to 10 square kilometres
- a boundary that respects the block structure from the previous census, where possible
- a boundary that respects census subdivision (CSD) limits. If a named area with DPL status crosses the boundary of two or more census subdivisions, then it is enumerated as multiple DPLs, each designated "Part A", "Part B", etc., rather than as a single DPL.

The status of designated place was created for the first time in the Canada 1996 Census. Prior to 1996, such areas were only counted as regular enumeration areas within the applicable census divisions, and no special aggregation of figures was published.

== Types ==
The provinces and territories of Canada can also have their own designated place types. The following are the designated place types as recorded in the 2016 census. (There were no designated places in Prince Edward Island, the Northwest Territories, and Nunavut for the 2016 census.)

Designated place type	Province/territory
CFA — Class IV area	Nova Scotia
DMU — Dissolved municipality	Ontario, Manitoba, Saskatchewan, Alberta
DPL — Designated place	Newfoundland and Labrador
IRI — Indian reserve / Réserve indienne	British Columbia
IST — Island trust	British Columbia
LNC — Localité non constituée	Quebec
LSB — Local service board	Ontario
LSD — Local service district / District de services locaux	New Brunswick
LUD — Local urban district	Manitoba
MDI — Municipalité dissoute	Quebec
MDP — Municipal defined places	Ontario
MET — Métis settlement	Alberta
NCM — Northern community	Manitoba
NVL — Nisga'a village	British Columbia
NS — Northern settlement	Saskatchewan
OHM — Organized hamlet	Saskatchewan
RPC — Retired population centre / Centre de population retiré	Newfoundland and Labrador, Nova Scotia, New Brunswick, Quebec, Ontario, Saskatchewan, British Columbia
SE — Aboriginal settlement	Yukon
UNP — Unincorporated place	Alberta, British Columbia
UUC — Unincorporated urban centre	Manitoba

== By province and territory ==
In the 2021 Census of Population, there were 1,685 designated places in Canada, an increase from 1,629 in the 2016 Census of Population. Designated places are present in nine provinces and two territories. Only Prince Edward Island and the Northwest Territories were without designated places in 2021.

=== Northwest Territories ===
There were no designated places in the Northwest Territories in 2021.

=== Nunavut ===
In the 2021 census, Nunavut had one designated place, an increase from none in 2016.

List of designated places in Nunavut
Name	Type	2021 Census of Population				
Name	Type	Population (2021)	Population (2016)	Change (%)	Land area (km^{2})	Population density (per km^{2})
Kugluktuk	Retired population centre	956	1,057	−9.6%	0.34	2,811.8/km^{2}

=== Prince Edward Island ===
There were no designated places in Prince Edward Island in 2021.

=== Yukon ===
In the 2021 census, Yukon had two designated places, an increase from one in 2016.

List of designated places in Yukon
Name	Type	2021 Census of Population				
Name	Type	Population (2021)	Population (2016)	Change (%)	Land area (km^{2})	Population density (per km^{2})
Carmacks Landing Settlement	Aboriginal settlement	206	168	+22.6%	2.41	85.5/km^{2}
Two Mile and Two and One-Half Mile Village	Interim protected land	162	188	−13.8%	1.24	130.6/km^{2}

== See also ==
- Census subdivision
- Census-designated place
