= CHWA-FM =

Radio station in Watson Lake, Yukon, Canada

- Watson Lake, Yukon; Canada
- Frequency: 102.1 MHz

Programming
- Format: First Nations community radio

Ownership
- Owner: Liard First Nation FM Society

History
- First air date: 1997

Technical information
- Repeater: 99.9 VF2330 (Upper Liard)

CHWA-FM is a Canadian radio station, which broadcasts at 102.1 FM in Watson Lake, Yukon. Owned by the Liard First Nation FM Society, the station broadcasts a community radio format for First Nations in the region.

CHWA also has a rebroadcaster in Upper Liard, operating on 99.9 FM with the call sign VF2330.

Coordinates: 60.062, -128.704
