= List of airlines of Yukon =

This is a list of airlines of Yukon which have an air operator's certificate issued by Transport Canada, the country's civil aviation authority. These are airlines that are based in Yukon.

== Current airlines ==
Airline	Image	IATA	ICAO	Callsign	Hub airport(s) or headquarters	Notes
Air North		4N	ANT	AIR NORTH	Erik Nielsen Whitehorse	Scheduled passenger service, charters, cargo
Alkan Air			AKN	ALKAN AIR	Erik Nielsen Whitehorse	Charters and MEDIVAC (air ambulance)
Capital Helicopters					Erik Nielsen Whitehorse	Helicopter charter service. Bell 206 and Robinson R44 Raven II aircraft.
