= Ibex Mountain =

Cinder cone in Yukon, Canada

Highest point
- Elevation: 2,106 m (6,909 ft)
- Prominence: 841 m (2,759 ft)
- Coordinates: 60°31′16.3″N 135°29′40.2″W

Geography
- Location: Yukon, Canada
- Parent range: Dezadeash Range
- Topo map: NTS 105D11 Whitehorse

Geology
- Rock age: Pleistocene
- Mountain type: Cinder cone
- Volcanic zone: Northern Cordilleran Volcanic Province
- Last eruption: Pleistocene

Ibex Mountain is a cinder cone in the Yukon Territory, Canada, located 33 km southwest of Whitehorse and 12 km southeast of Mount Arkell. It is in a group of basaltic cones and lava flows called Alligator Lake volcanic complex and is in the Northern Cordilleran Volcanic Province. It is believed Ibex Mountain last erupted during the Pleistocene. Ibex Mountain is at the head of the Ibex River, which is southeast of Whitehorse. There is a road that runs close to Ibex Lake on the southeast side of the summit. From there is the hike to the summit of the cone.

Basalt at Ibex Mountain has been dated to 2.4 million years old via Potassium-argon dating. The cone survived the ice age because of the elevation above most of the ice (above 1,800 m or 5,900 ft).

The Ibex Valley, located approximately 16 kilometres (9.9 mi) west of Whitehorse, is named after the cone.

== See also ==
- List of Northern Cordilleran volcanoes
- List of volcanoes in Canada
- Volcanism of Canada
