= Takhini Hot Springs =

Natural hot springs in Yukon, Canada

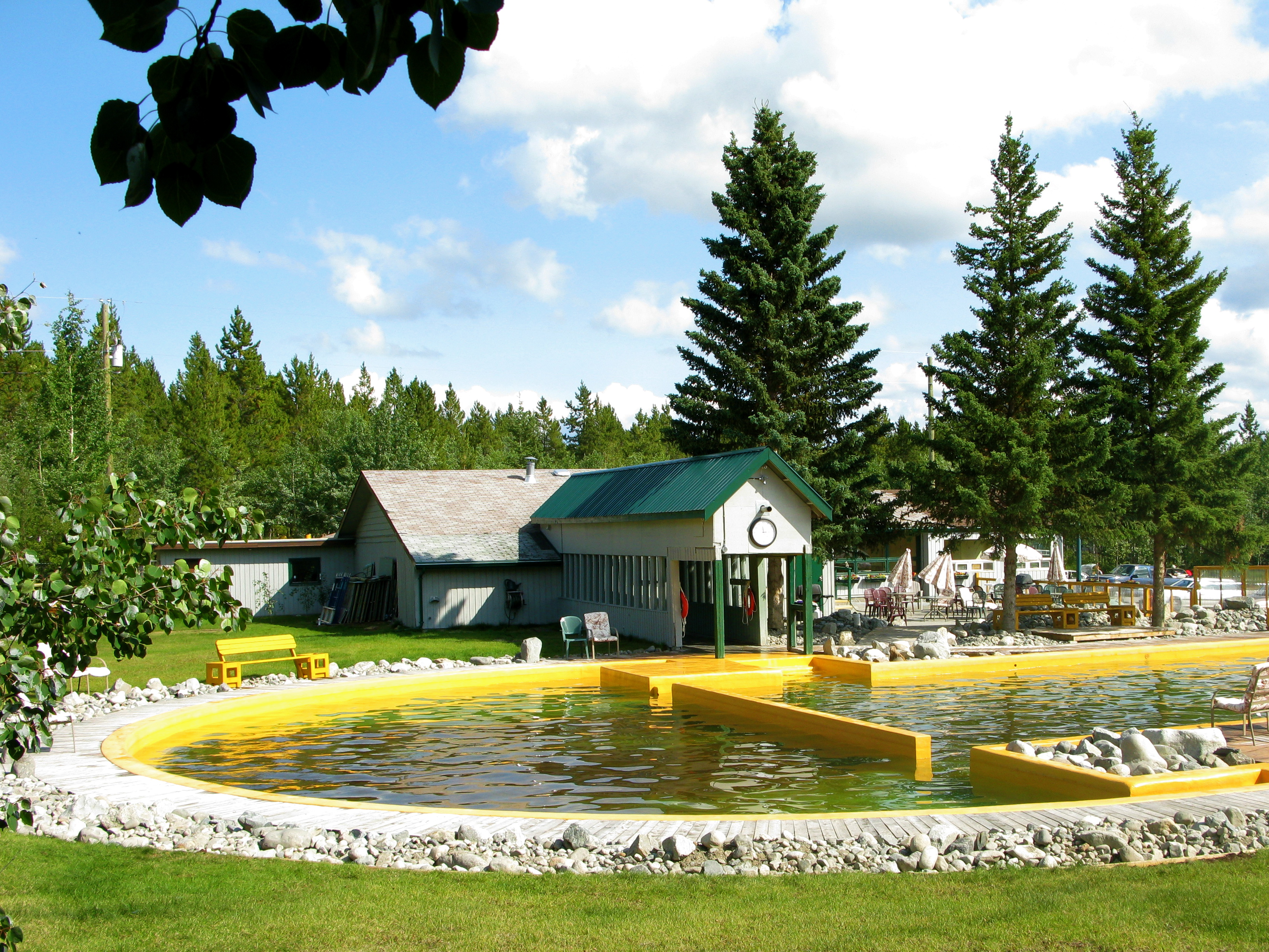
- Interactive map of Takhini Hot Springs
- Location: Whitehorse, Yukon, Canada, Y1A 7A2
- Coordinates: 60°52′44″N 135°21′33″W

Website
- http://www.takhinihotsprings.com

Takhini Hot Springs (Takhini Hotspring) (tɑːkiːniː) is a natural hot springs located just outside the border of Whitehorse, Yukon (28 km (17 mi) from the city centre). It is a locally run business which incorporates two pools at different temperatures and has a campground with over 80 sites. The site has been in operation for more than 100 years.

== Water ==
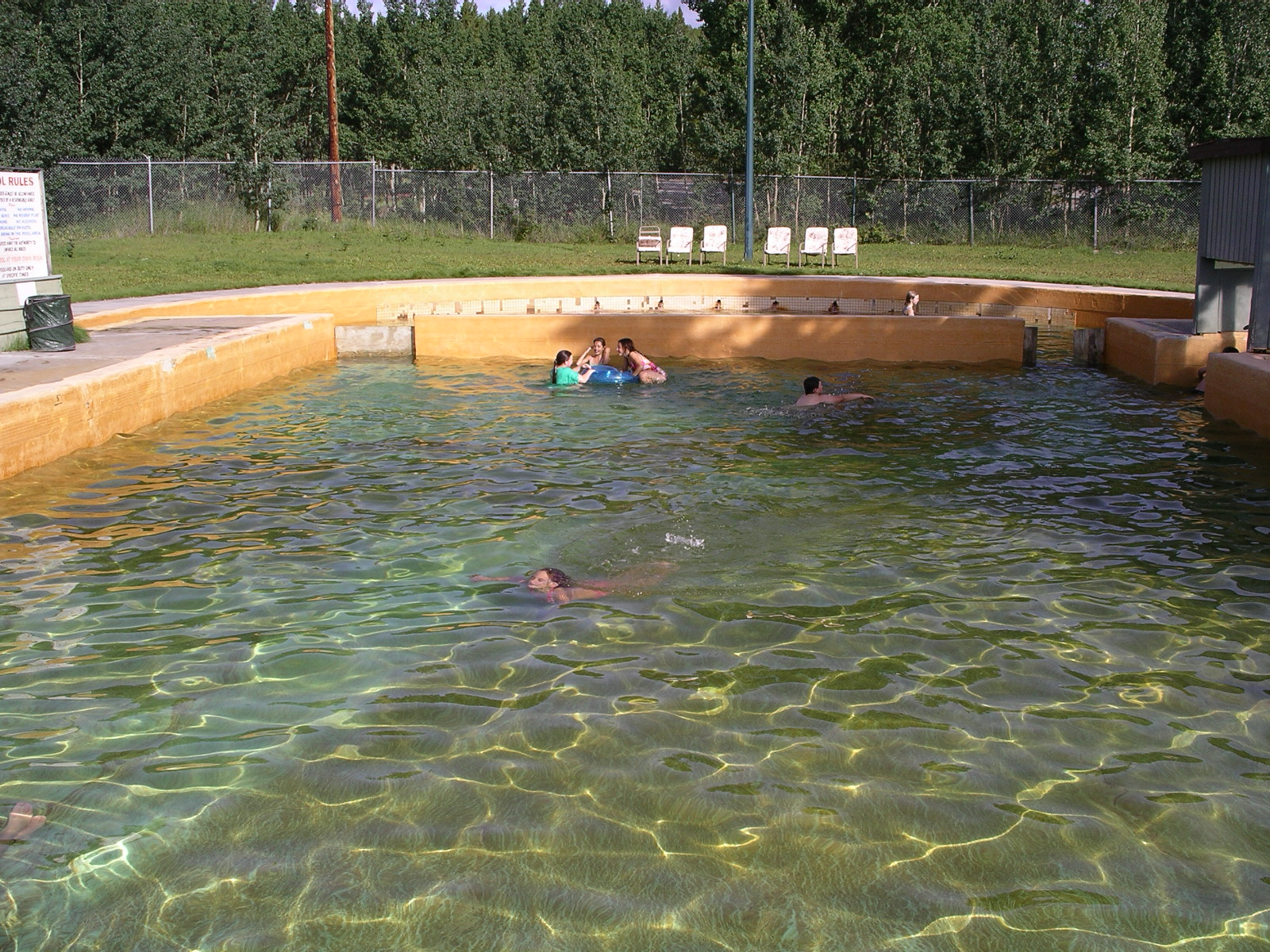
Main pool area

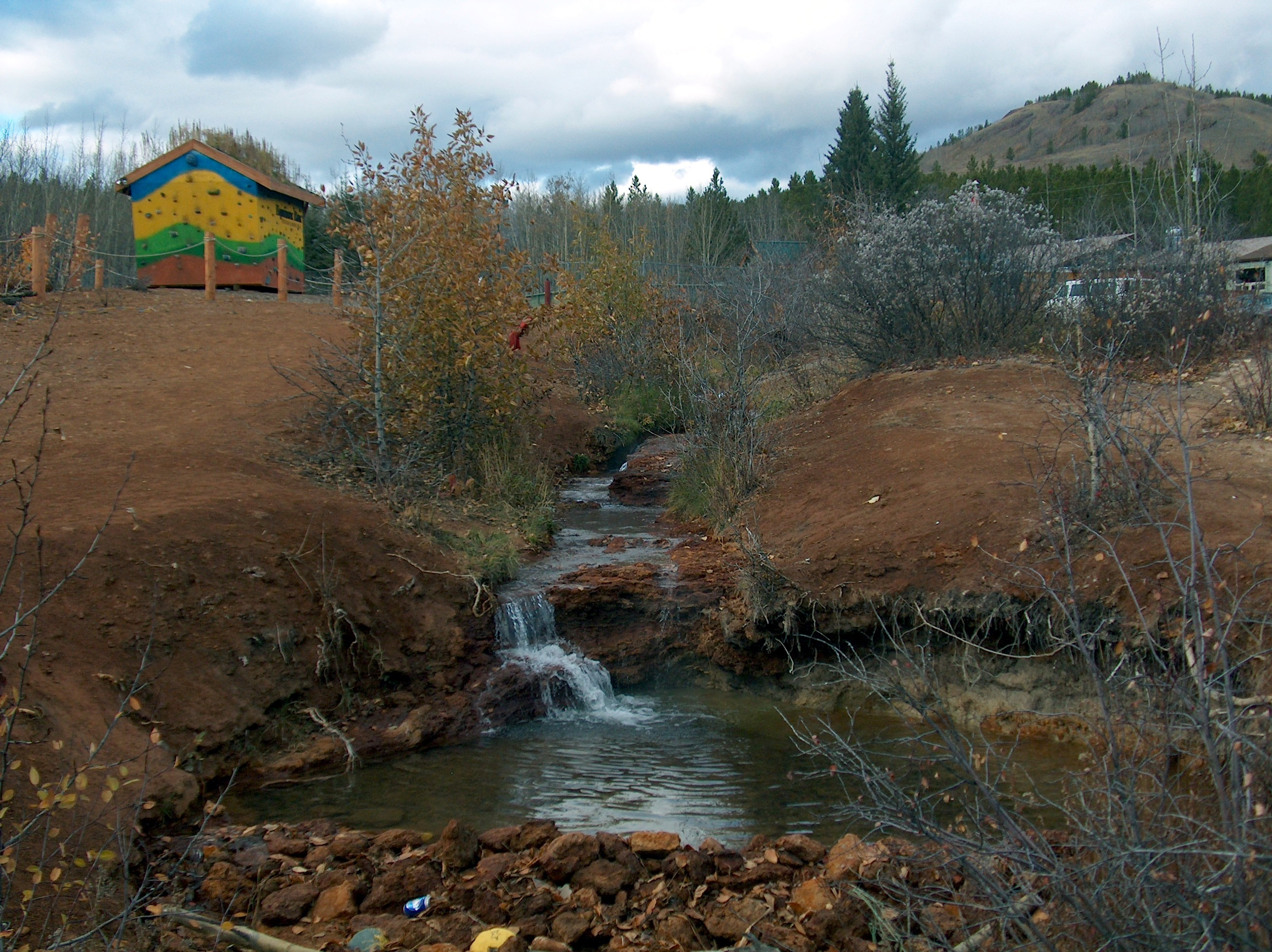
Runoff from the pool area

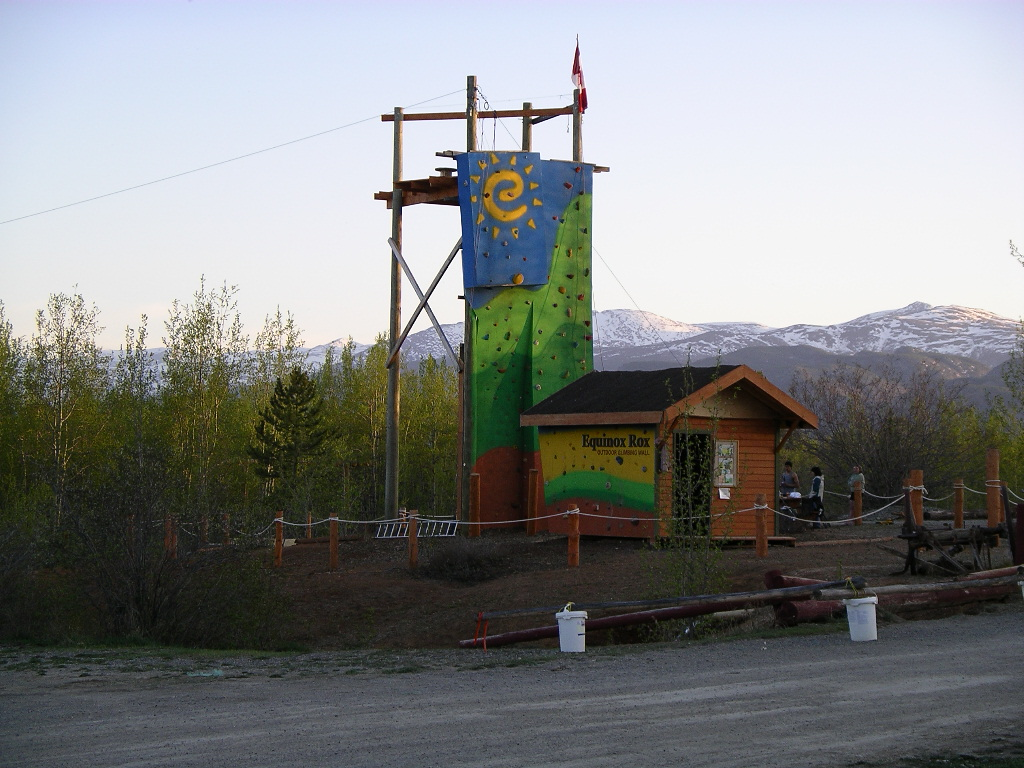
Zipline across the lake

The hot springs flows from the earth to the surface at a rate of 385 L (85 imp gal; 102 US gal) per minute. The temperature from the source is 46.5 °C (115.7 °F). The pool is divided into two sections: the hot side and the cool side. As the water flows from the source to the hot pool the water cools to 42 °C (108 °F), the cool side is an average of 36 °C (97 °F). Takhini Hot Springs does not have a sulphurous odour.

According to tests, it has taken a minimum of 60 years for the water in the pools to come from the ground into the source. During its underground journey to the surface, the water reaches a maximum temperature of 95 °C (203 °F) and then cools down as it rises to the surface and into the source.

== History ==
Takhini Hot Springs has a long history in Yukon. It used to be called Jim Boss' Bathtub, after the famous First Nations Chief whose village was on the marsh, maintained a bathtub there. Used by the First Nations for centuries, the site was known for natural hot water flowing from the ground. In 1902, Wiliam Puckett and A.R. Gordon submitted the original application for the lease of the property; they purchased the land for $2 per acre in 1907. They commercially promoted the springs for their therapeutic value. The first pool was made of wood and canvas and was built in the 1940s for the use of the United States Army while they constructed the Alaska Highway. In 1950 a concrete pool was built and that was later replaced by the existing pool and building in the 1970s. In 2008, renovations were undertaken to improve the pool's facilities.

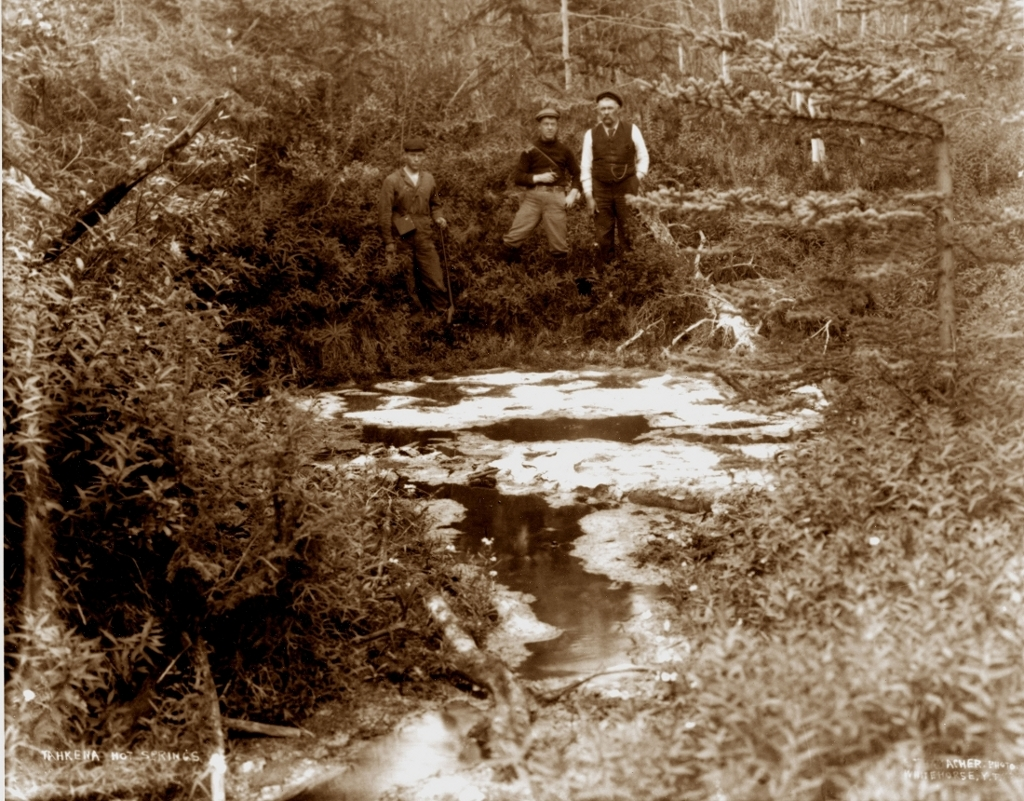
Takhini Hot Springs in 1907

Mineral content of water:

Analytical category	Unit	Amount
pH value	pH units	6.7
Temperature	°C	46.2
Total dissolved solids	ppm	1145
Total hardness as CaCo3	mg/L	1770
Calcium (ca)	mg/L	580
Magnesium (Mg)	mg/L	78.2
Sodium (Na)	mg/L	36.5
Potassium (K)	mg/L	8.7
Silicon (Si)	mg/L	19.8
Chloride (Cl)	mg/L	1.5
Fluoride (F)	mg/L	3.62
Iron (Fe2+)	mg/L	0.9
Sulfate (SO4)	mg/L	1740
Total alkalinity (CaCO3)	mg/L	104

== Hair freezing competition ==
The resort holds an annual contest called The International Hair Freezing Contest which started in 2011. The most recent contest, in 2020, received 288 entries for the five category competition. Categories include the Best Male, Best Female, Best Group, Nongshim's People's Choice and Tim Horton's Most Creative. The winner in each category receives CAD$2000 and free hot spring passes. To enter participants have to come to the Takhini Hot Pools between the months of December and March, only on days when the temperature is below −20 °C (−4 °F).

== Climate ==
Takhini River Ranch, a weather station near Takhini Hot Springs, has a subarctic climate (Köppen Dfc).

Climate data for Takhini River Ranch, Yukon (1981-2010): 671 m (2,201 ft)
Month	Jan	Feb	Mar	Apr	May	Jun	Jul	Aug	Sep	Oct	Nov	Dec	Year
Record high °C (°F)	9.0 (48.2)	13.5 (56.3)	12.5 (54.5)	22.0 (71.6)	34.5 (94.1)	34.5 (94.1)	32.5 (90.5)	31.5 (88.7)	26.0 (78.8)	22.0 (71.6)	13.5 (56.3)	13.0 (55.4)	34.5 (94.1)
Mean daily maximum °C (°F)	−12.9 (8.8)	−7.2 (19.0)	−0.5 (31.1)	7.2 (45.0)	14.3 (57.7)	19.8 (67.6)	21.2 (70.2)	19.1 (66.4)	12.9 (55.2)	3.7 (38.7)	−7.1 (19.2)	−9.0 (15.8)	5.1 (41.2)
Daily mean °C (°F)	−18.2 (−0.8)	−14.0 (6.8)	−7.9 (17.8)	0.3 (32.5)	6.9 (44.4)	11.9 (53.4)	13.9 (57.0)	11.7 (53.1)	6.6 (43.9)	−1.0 (30.2)	−11.8 (10.8)	−14.5 (5.9)	−1.3 (29.6)
Mean daily minimum °C (°F)	−23.4 (−10.1)	−20.7 (−5.3)	−15.3 (4.5)	−6.7 (19.9)	−0.4 (31.3)	3.9 (39.0)	6.6 (43.9)	4.3 (39.7)	0.2 (32.4)	−5.8 (21.6)	−16.4 (2.5)	−20.1 (−4.2)	−7.8 (17.9)
Record low °C (°F)	−53.0 (−63.4)	−49.5 (−57.1)	−44.5 (−48.1)	−36.5 (−33.7)	−13.0 (8.6)	−8.0 (17.6)	−1.5 (29.3)	−4.0 (24.8)	−20.0 (−4.0)	−36.0 (−32.8)	−48.0 (−54.4)	−50.5 (−58.9)	−53.0 (−63.4)
Average precipitation mm (inches)	14.8 (0.58)	7.9 (0.31)	7.6 (0.30)	3.1 (0.12)	15.2 (0.60)	30.6 (1.20)	39.6 (1.56)	37.3 (1.47)	26.8 (1.06)	17.7 (0.70)	14.7 (0.58)	12.3 (0.48)	227.6 (8.96)
Average snowfall cm (inches)	14.8 (5.8)	7.9 (3.1)	7.6 (3.0)	2.2 (0.9)	1.1 (0.4)	0.0 (0.0)	0.0 (0.0)	0.0 (0.0)	2.3 (0.9)	9.0 (3.5)	14.6 (5.7)	12.3 (4.8)	71.8 (28.1)
Source: Environment Canada
