= Apostolic Vicariate of Yukon-Prince Rupert =

The Apostolic Vicariate of Yukon-Prince Rupert (until 1967Apostolic Prefecture of Yukon or Apostolic Prefecture of the Yukon-Prince Rupert, (Latin: Praefectura Apostolica Yuconensis et Principis Ruberti) was a Catholic missionary jurisdiction in the extreme northwestern portion of Canada from 1908 until 1916.

== History ==
Extending from 54° North latitude to the Arctic Ocean and from the summit of the Rocky Mountains to 141° West longitude, it covered an area of about 312,000 sq. miles. The prefecture comprised two distinct districts, the Yukon Territory and the northern part of British Columbia, which, prior to the erection of the new prefecture, belonged to different jurisdictions; the former being attached to the Apostolic Vicariate of Mackensie River and the latter to the Roman Catholic Diocese of New Westminster.

The prefecture was established on March 9, 1908, and entrusted to the Oblate Fathers of Mary Immaculate. The first prefect, E. M. Bunoz, was appointed on April 8 of the same year.

At Dawson, the metropolis of the Klondike gold fields, the first house of worship (Church of St. Mary) and first hospital, both log buildings, were erected in 1907–1908 by the Jesuit Judge (d. at Dawson, 1899). Gendreau, who succeeded Judge, enlarged and transformed the rough church besides establishing the first school of the territory. This school was rebuilt on a larger scale in the centre of the town in 1901 under the prefect who succeeded Gendreau in 1902.

It was promoted to Apostolic Vicariate in 1916, split Apostolic Vicariate of Prince Rupert 1944, renamed and promoted Roman Catholic Diocese of Prince George in 1967, suffragan of the Metropolitan of Vancouver.

== Sources and external links ==
- GCatholic - Whitehorse successor diocese
- GigaCatholic - Canada
