= Lansdowne, Yukon =

Coordinates: 60.260491°N 134.560526°W

Lansdowne is a community in Yukon, Canada. It in the middle of Tagish Road in between the Klondike and Alaska highways. It is close to Conrad and Carcross.
