= Order of precedence in Yukon =

Relative preeminence of officials for ceremonial purposes

The Yukon order of precedence is a nominal and symbolic hierarchy of important positions within the territory of Yukon. It has no legal standing but is used to dictate ceremonial protocol at events of a territorial nature.

1. The King of Canada (His Majesty Charles III)
2. The Governor General of Canada (Louise Arbour)
3. The Commissioner of Yukon (Angélique Bernard)
4. Members of the Canadian Royal Family
5. The Premier of Yukon (Mike Pemberton)
6. The Speaker of the Yukon Legislative Assembly (Jeremy Harper)
7. The Justices of the Supreme Court of Yukon
8. Members of the Executive Council of Yukon
9. The Leader of the Official Opposition (Currie Dixon)
10. Members of the Yukon Legislative Assembly with precedence governed by the date of their first election to the Legislature
11. Member of the Senate for the Yukon (Pat Duncan)
12. Member of Parliament for the Yukon (Brendan Hanley)
13. Yukon First Nation Chiefs and Council of Yukon First Nations
14. Bishops of Roman Catholic and Anglican faiths with precedence determined by order of appointment
15. R.C.M.P. Divisional Commanding Officer (C/Supt. Scott Sheppard)
16. Armed Forces Commander
17. Judges of the Territorial Court of Yukon
18. The Mayor of Whitehorse (Laura Cabott)
19. Yukon Government Deputy Ministers and senior Yukon Government officials with the status of Deputy Ministers, with precedence according to the respective dates of their appointments to the position
