= Grand Forks, Yukon =

Ex-town in Yukon

Coordinates: 63.9202°N 139.3169°W

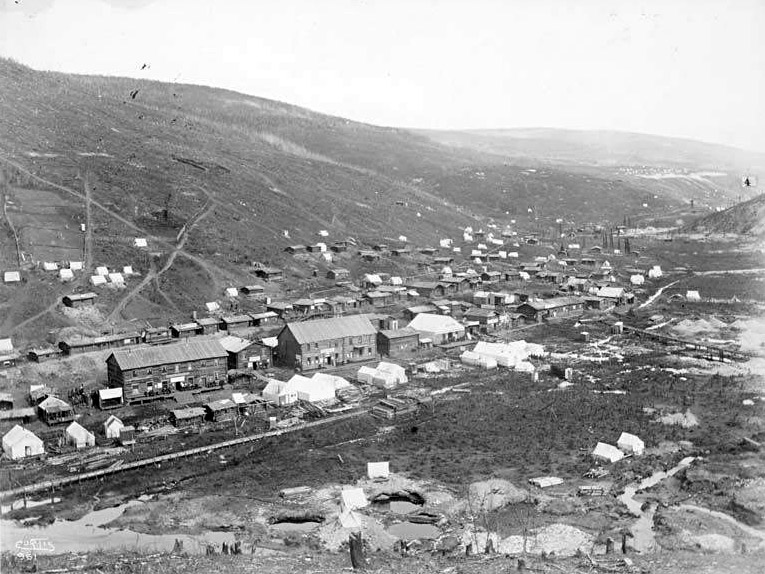
Grand Forks Hotel in 1898, second building from left

Grand Forks was a town and former community at the confluence of Bonanza Creek and Eldorado Creek in the Canadian territory of Yukon. First settled about 1896, it became the second-largest settlement in the Klondike. With approximately 10,000 people living in or by Grand Forks during the Klondike Gold Rush, it was the only community besides Dawson City to have a municipal government. The Grand Forks Hotel was a roadhouse here during the gold rush. Nothing of Grand Forks remains today.

== See also ==
- List of ghost towns in Yukon
