= McQuistan =

McQuistan is a surname. Notable people with the surname include:

- Dugald McQuistan (1879–1946) Scottish mathematician
- Finlay McQuistan (1896–1950), British World War I flying ace
- Pat McQuistan (born 1983), American football player
- Paul McQuistan (born 1983), American football player
