= Teslin Crossing =

Unincorporated area in Yukon, Canada

Coordinates: 61°14′34″N 134°36′50″W

Teslin Crossing is an unincorporated area in Yukon, Canada, located on the Teslin River about 40 km (25 mi) north-northeast of Whitehorse.

== See also ==
- Teslin (disambiguation)
