= Teslin Lake, Yukon =

Coordinates: 60°13′59″N 132°54′50″W

Teslin Lake is an unincorporated area in the Yukon Territory, Canada, located a few kilometres northwest from the Village of Teslin (Teslin Post), which is also on the east shore of Teslin Lake.

== See also ==
- Teslin (disambiguation)
