= Scouting and Guiding in Yukon =

Scouting in Yukon dates back to 1913, serving thousands of young men and women.

== Scouting in Yukon ==
Yukon is administratively connected to British Columbia in the Cascadia Council (formally the BC/Yukon Council) of Scouts Canada.

Among Yukon's varied Scouting groups are Scouts and Venturers.

== Girl Guiding in Yukon ==

Girls from age 5 through 17 are served by the Yukon District of Girl Guides of Canada-Guides du Canada. Yukon District is part of the Aurora Adventures Area Council and Alberta Council. Through financial support from YRAC, Yukon District can provide administrative support to Guiders and girls through the Guide Office (102-302 Steele Street, Whitehorse, Y1A 2C5, 667–2455).

== See also ==
Scouting and Guiding in Canada's provinces and territories
