= Canyon City, Yukon =

Coordinates: 60°39′29″N 135°00′06″W

Canyon City is a Klondike Gold Rush ghost town and a Yukon Government Heritage Site. It is located about 7 km from downtown Whitehorse, Yukon, at the upstream end of Miles Canyon on the Yukon River. Summer tours are encouraged.

Archaeological work shows evidence that First Nations people have used this area for many thousands of years. There were seasonal fish camps above and below Miles Canyon and the Whitehorse Rapids. Early explorers had little contact with the indigenous population, although Frederick Schwatka, in 1883, made note of a First Nations portage trail bypassing Miles Canyon, and, in 1887, George Mercer Dawson, noted the large number of salmon above the canyon — salmon were one of the fish that were important to the aboriginal population.

== 1898 The Gold Rush ==
During the Klondike Gold Rush, the thousands of stampeders travelling down the Yukon River to Dawson, Miles Canyon and the Whitehorse Rapids were the most treacherous obstacles on the entire route. Canyon City, at the upstream end of the canyon, was the place where people stopped to plan their next move. Many unloaded their boats and laboriously portaged their goods.

By June 1898, a huge bottleneck had developed at Canyon City. Nearly 300 boats had been wrecked in the rapids, and five people had drowned; North-West Mounted Police Inspector Samuel Steele confessed: "why more casualties have not occurred is a mystery to me." Steele issued an order that skilled pilots had to be hired to take the boats through.

By then, a tramway had been built on the east bank of the river. It was eight kilometers (five miles) long and ran from Canyon City to the foot of the rapids, just across from the present site of downtown Whitehorse, hauling goods on horse-drawn cars for three cents per pound (454 grams). A rival tram was also built on the west bank of the river. A small settlement developed at Canyon City, and a townsite was even surveyed there. Although it thrived for a short time, by 1900 the White Pass railway was completed to Whitehorse, and Canyon City had lost its reason for existence. Of the many modes of transportation developed during the gold rush, the most practical was the White Pass & Yukon Route, a narrow-gauge railway connecting Skagway, Alaska, at tidewater, with Whitehorse, at the head of navigation on the Yukon River.
