= Champagne Landing =

Champagne Landing Champagne Landing 10
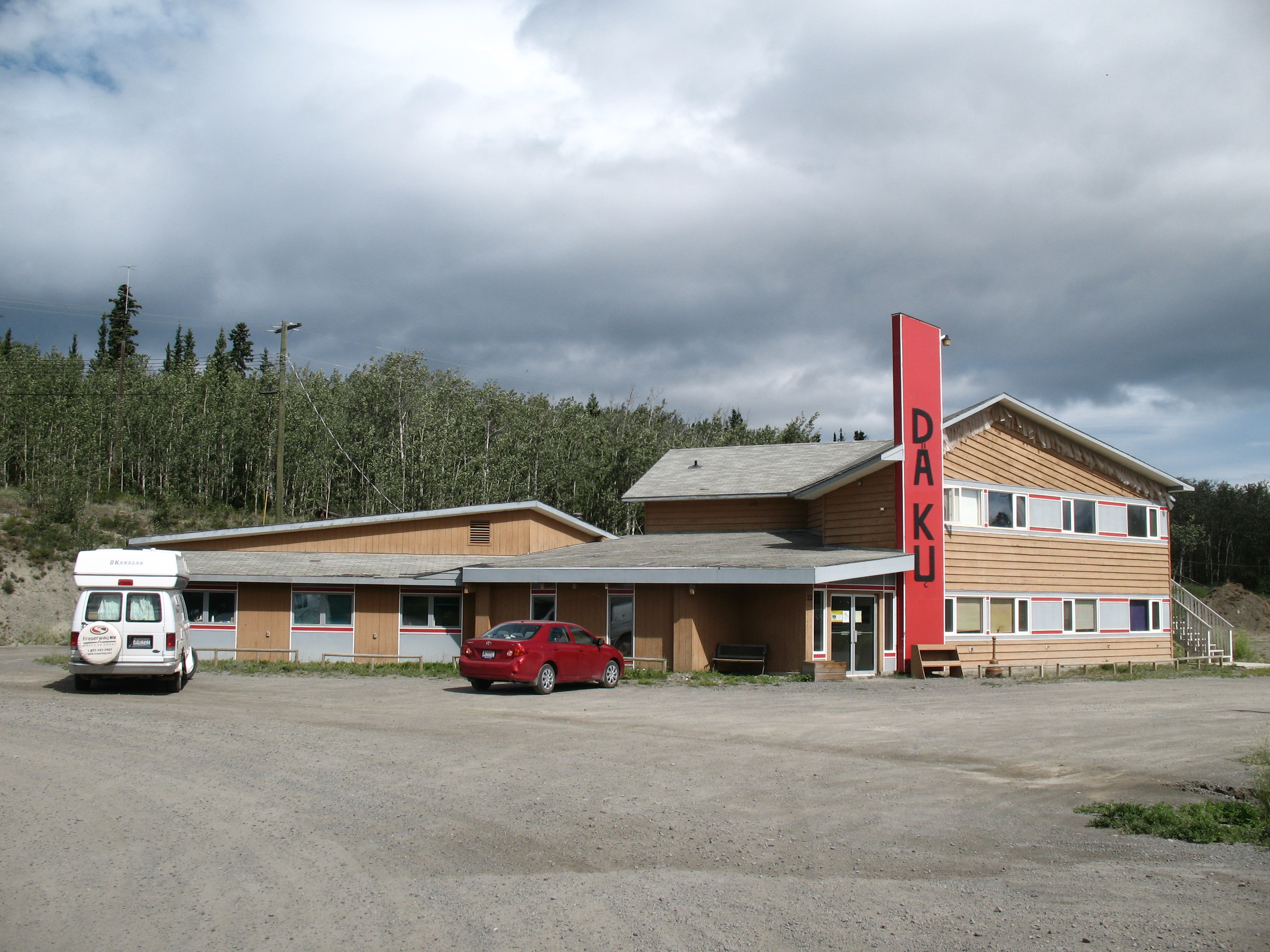

- Location within Canada
- Coordinates: 60°47′9″N 136°28′50″W
- Country: Canada
- Territory: Yukon

Area
  - Land: 4.82 km^{2} (1.86 sq mi)

Population (2021)
  - Total: 22
- Time zone: UTC−07:00 (MST)

Champagne Landing or Champagne Landing 10 is a First Nations settlement in Yukon, Canada. It is located on the Alaska Highway (historical mile 968, between Whitehorse and Haines Junction). Its residents are citizens of the Champagne and Aishihik First Nations.

== History ==
Champagne is on the Dezadeash River, one of the tributaries of the Alsek. The original Dalton Trail connected to this settlement, and a roadhouse was built there in 1902. The Alaska highway no longer routes through the community, having been rerouted in the fall of 2002. The old roadway is still open to provide access. Many residents have moved to Haines Junction, where their nation has more services available.

== Demographics ==
Federal census population history of Champagne Landing
Year	Pop.	±%
1996	8	—
2001	20	+150.0%
2006	24	+20.0%
2011	25	+4.2%
2016	20	−20.0%
2021	22	+10.0%
Source: Statistics Canada

In the 2021 Census of Population conducted by Statistics Canada, Champagne Landing 10 had a population of 22 living in 30 of its 43 total private dwellings, a change of 10% from its 2016 population of 20. With a land area of 4.82 km^{2} (1.86 sq mi), it had a population density of 4.6/km^{2} (11.8/sq mi) in 2021.
