= Paris, Yukon =

Community in Klondike, Yukon, Canada

Coordinates: 63°48′38.5″N 138°38′54.7″W

Paris was a small community in the Klondike region of Yukon, Canada, on Dominion Creek during the Klondike Gold Rush (1898). Postal contract documents showed that it still existed in 1911, but all traces have disappeared today. It owed its name to its large proportion of French speakers and the fact that its postmaster was born in Paris, France.
