= Ibex Valley, Yukon =

Hamlet in Yukon, Canada

Coordinates: 60°50′42″N 135°38′18″W

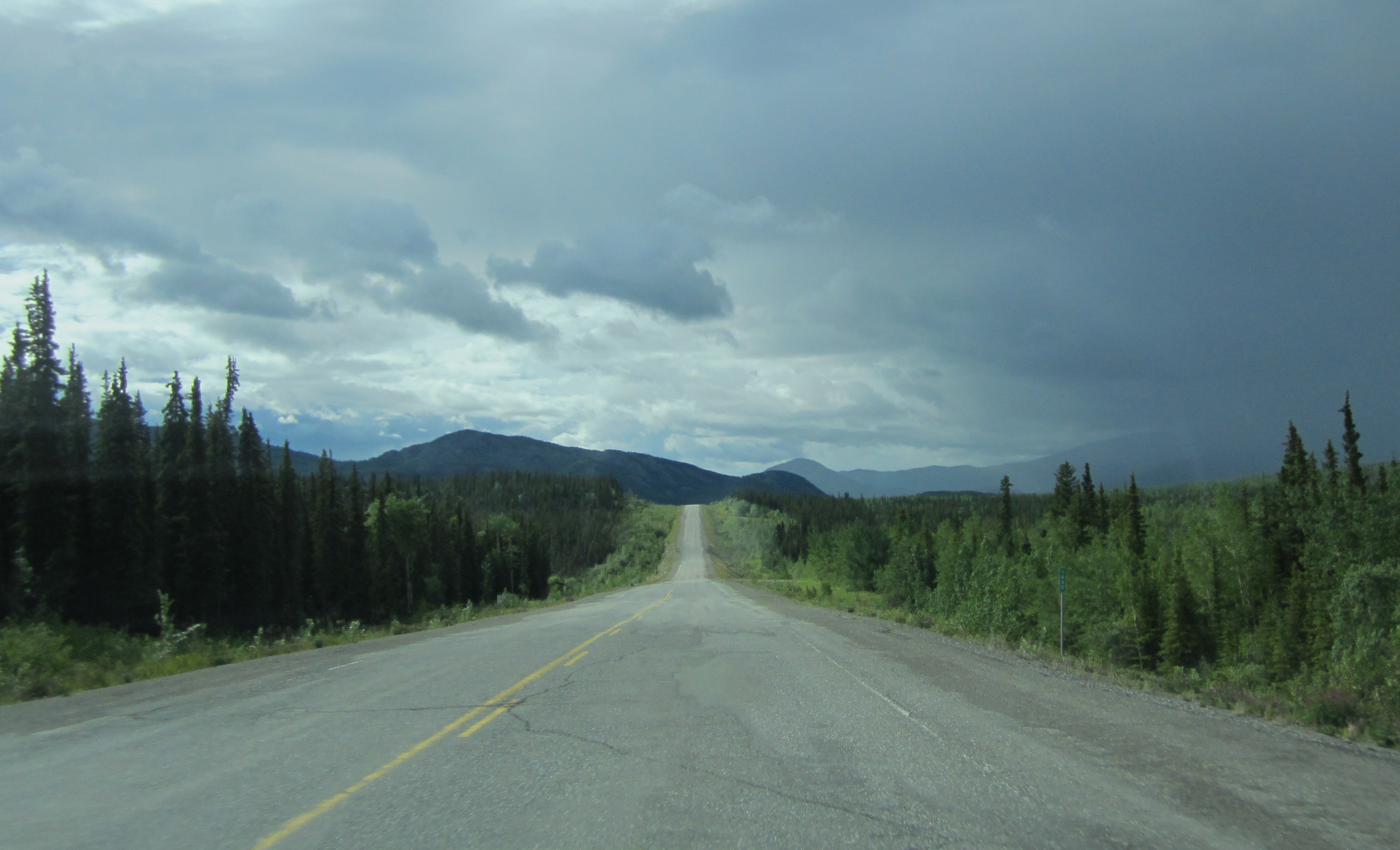
Alaska Highway through Ibex Valley

Ibex Valley is a hamlet in Canada's Yukon. The hamlet is considered a local advisory area with an advisory council providing local government. Its population, according to the 2021 Canadian Census, was 523.

== Geography ==
Ibex Valley comprises residential areas along the Alaska Highway immediately outside the Whitehorse city limits as far as approximately historical mile 945, as well as a small number of sideroads, including a five-mile loop of the original Alaska Highway alignment from Mile 929 to 934. The hamlet is part of the Whitehorse Census Agglomeration.

== Demographics ==
Federal census population history of Ibex Valley
Year	Pop.	±%
1986	97	—
1991	240	+147.4%
1996	322	+34.2%
2001	315	−2.2%
2006	376	+19.4%
2011	346	−8.0%
2016	411	+18.8%
2021	523	+27.3%
Source: Statistics Canada

In the 2021 Census of Population conducted by Statistics Canada, Ibex Valley had a population of 523 living in 225 of its 261 total private dwellings, a change of 27.3% from its 2016 population of 411. With a land area of 207.13 km^{2} (79.97 sq mi), it had a population density of 2.5/km^{2} (6.5/sq mi) in 2021.

Seventy percent of Ibex Valley's population is non-aboriginal.

Panethnic groups in the Hamlet of Ibex Valley (2001−2021)
Panethnic group	2021		2016		2006		2001	
Panethnic group	Pop.	%	Pop.	%	Pop.	%	Pop.	%
European (Note: Statistic includes all persons that did not make up part of a visible minority or an indigenous identity.)	465	71.54%	310	72.09%	275	73.33%	220	69.84%
Indigenous	185	28.46%	115	26.74%	95	25.33%	90	28.57%
African	0	0%	10	2.33%	10	2.67%	0	0%
East Asian (Note: Statistic includes total responses of "Chinese", "Korean", and "Japanese" under visible minority section on census.)	0	0%	10	2.33%	0	0%	0	0%
South Asian	0	0%	0	0%	0	0%	0	0%
Southeast Asian (Note: Statistic includes total responses of "Filipino" and "Southeast Asian" under visible minority section on census.)	0	0%	0	0%	0	0%	0	0%
Middle Eastern (Note: Statistic includes total responses of "West Asian" and "Arab" under visible minority section on census.)	0	0%	0	0%	0	0%	0	0%
Latin American	0	0%	0	0%	0	0%	0	0%
Other/multiracial (Note: Statistic includes total responses of "Visible minority, n.i.e." and "Multiple visible minorities" under visible minority section on census.)	0	0%	0	0%	0	0%	10	3.17%
Total responses	650	124.28%	430	104.62%	375	99.73%	315	100%
Total population	523	100%	411	100%	376	100%	315	100%
Note: Totals greater than 100% due to multiple origin responses

== Economy ==
While most residents work in Whitehorse, some residents are engaged in agriculture or wilderness tourism activities.

== Infrastructure ==
Ibex Valley has a volunteer fire department.

== See also ==
- Ibex Valley
- Ibex Mountain
