= Mount Lorne =

Hamlet in Yukon, Canada

Coordinates: 60°26′20″N 134°55′30″W

Mount Lorne is a hamlet in Canada's Yukon. The hamlet is considered a local advisory area with an advisory council providing local government.

Mount Lorne is located just south of Whitehorse, comprising rural residential areas along the South Klondike Highway, the Annie Lake Road and connecting sideroads. It is part of the Whitehorse Census Agglomeration. Eighty-seven per cent of the population is non-aboriginal.

== Demographics ==
Federal census population history of Mount Lorne
Year	Pop.	±%
1986	6	—
1991	316	+5166.7%
1996	399	+26.3%
2001	379	−5.0%
2006	370	−2.4%
2011	408	+10.3%
2016	437	+7.1%
2021	468	+7.1%
Source: Statistics Canada

In the 2021 Census of Population conducted by Statistics Canada, Mt. Lorne had a population of 468 living in 222 of its 246 total private dwellings, a change of 7.1% from its 2016 population of 437. With a land area of 159.23 km^{2} (61.48 sq mi), it had a population density of 2.9/km^{2} (7.6/sq mi) in 2021.

== Public Services ==
The Mount Lorne community is served by the Mount Lorne Volunteer Fire Department. The Mount Lorne Transfer Station hosts a recycling centre and a free store where residents can drop off clean unwanted belongings for a small fee. The transfer station was also the first place in the Yukon to establish a public electric car charging station.

== Tourism ==
Hiking is a popular tourist attraction in the area, with easy access to trails and the nearby mountain of the town's namesake. Mount Lorne is also popular among dog sled mushers, with some practicing for the Iditarod and Yukon Quest sled races there. The Lorne Mountain Community Centre hosts the Carbon Hill Sled Dog and Skijor Race, dubbed as "The biggest little race in the Yukon," with a 30-mile long sled race as well as a 200 meter dog dash for children. The centre also has 12 kilometers of ski tracks, and other facilities such as disc golf and an 18-hole wilderness golf course are located nearby.
