= Conrad, Yukon =

Community in Yukon, Canada

Coordinates: 60.067492°N 134.560526°W

Conrad is a community in Yukon, Canada, located on the Klondike Highway. It is 14 km away from the Carcross, and also approximately 10 km from the British Columbia border.

Conrad was founded in 1905 by Colonel J.H. Conrad of the Conrad Consolidated Mining Company, and had about 300 residents at its peak. It was abandoned within a decade once falling silver prices drove the company into bankruptcy.

A new campground was opened on land adjoining the original town location in 2016.
