= Two and One-Half Mile Village =

- Location within Canada
- Coordinates: 60.152°N 128.877°W
- Country: Canada
- Territory: Yukon

Area
  - Total: 5.17 km^{2} (2.00 sq mi)

Population (2011)
  - Total: 125
  - Density: 24.2/km^{2} (63/sq mi)
  - Change 2006-11: ▲31.6%
- Time zone: UTC−07:00 (MST)
- Highways: Robert Campbell Highway (Highway 4)

Two and One-Half Mile Village is a First Nations community in southeast Yukon, Canada. It is located on the Robert Campbell Highway (Highway 4), within the Town of Watson Lake municipal boundaries, northwest of the downtown of Watson Lake. The settlement is recognized as a census subdivision by Statistics Canada.

== Demographics ==
Federal census population history of Two and One-Half Mile Village
Year	Pop.	±%
1981	43	—
1986	21	−51.2%
1991	2	−90.5%
1996	44	+2100.0%
2001	67	+52.3%
2006	95	+41.8%
2011	125	+31.6%
Source: Statistics Canada

In the 2011 Census, Statistics Canada originally reported that Two and One-Half Mile Village had a population of 0 living in 0 dwellings, a decrease from its 2006 population of 95. Statistics Canada subsequently amended the 2011 census results to a population of 125 living in 44 of its 44 total dwellings, a 31.6% change from 2006. With a land area of 5.17 km^{2} (2.00 sq mi), it had a population density of 24.18/km^{2} (62.62/sq mi) in 2011.

== See also ==
- List of communities in Yukon
