= Two Mile Village =

- Location within Canada
- Coordinates: 60.131°N 128.828°W
- Country: Canada
- Territory: Yukon

Area
  - Total: 3.57 km^{2} (1.38 sq mi)

Population (2011)
  - Total: 79
  - Density: 22.1/km^{2} (57/sq mi)
  - Change 2006-11: ▼10.2%
- Time zone: UTC−07:00 (MST)
- Highways: Robert Campbell Highway (Highway 4)

Two Mile Village is a First Nations community in southeast Yukon, Canada. It is located on the Robert Campbell Highway (Highway 4), within the municipal boundaries of the Town of Watson Lake, northwest of the downtown of Watson Lake. The settlement is recognized as a census subdivision by Statistics Canada.

== Demographics ==
Federal census population history of Two Mile Village
| Year | Pop. | ±% |
|---|---|---|
| 1981 | 55 | — |
| 1986 | 85 | +54.5% |
| 1996 | 103 | +21.2% |
| 2001 | 61 | −40.8% |
| 2006 | 88 | +44.3% |
| 2011 | 79 | −10.2% |
Source: Statistics Canada

In the 2011 Census, Statistics Canada originally reported that Two Mile Village had a population of 10 living in 5 dwellings, an -88.8% change from its 2006 population of 79. Statistics Canada subsequently amended the 2011 census results to a population of 79 living in 34 of its 37 total dwellings, a -10.2% change from 2006. With a land area of 3.57 km^{2} (1.38 sq mi), it had a population density of 22.13/km^{2} (57.3/sq mi) in 2011.

== See also ==
- List of communities in Yukon
