= Destruction Bay =

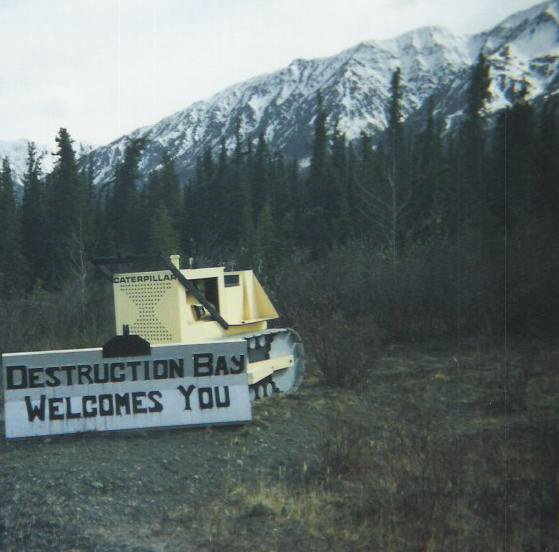
- Welcome sign made on an old bulldozer

- Location within Canada
- Coordinates: 61°15′15″N 138°48′24″W
- Country: Canada
- Territory: Yukon

Area
  - Land: 13.57 km^{2} (5.24 sq mi)

Population (2016)
  - Total: 55
  - Density: 4.1/km^{2} (11/sq mi)
- Time zone: UTC−07:00 (MST)

Destruction Bay is a small community on the Alaska Highway (historical mile 1083) in Canada's Yukon on Kluane Lake.

Populated mostly by non-aboriginal residents, community residents provide Yukon government services to residents in the area (school, highway maintenance), including nearby Burwash Landing and some tourism-related businesses along the Alaska Highway. The name is derived from the wind blowing down structures erected by the military during highway construction in 1942–43.

The community has a school with three classrooms serving kindergarten through grade eight.

== Demographics ==
Federal census population history of Destruction Bay
| Year | Pop. | ±% |
|---|---|---|
| 1981 | 49 | — |
| 1986 | 48 | −2.0% |
| 1991 | 32 | −33.3% |
| 1996 | 34 | +6.2% |
| 2001 | 43 | +26.5% |
| 2006 | 55 | +27.9% |
| 2011 | 35 | −36.4% |
| 2016 | 55 | +57.1% |
| 2021 | 40 | −27.3% |
Source: Statistics Canada

In the 2021 Census of Population conducted by Statistics Canada, Destruction Bay had a population of 40 living in 16 of its 32 total private dwellings, a change of −27.3% from its 2016 population of 55. With a land area of 13.9 km^{2} (5.4 sq mi), it had a population density of 2.9/km^{2} (7.5/sq mi) in 2021.

== History ==
In 1942, a camp was set up to be used by crews working to build the Alaska Highway. It was used for housing of workers, as well as a stopping place for truckers to rest, refuel, and service their equipment. Not long after it was built, a severe windstorm destroyed many of the buildings in the camp, leading to the name Destruction Bay.
