= Upper Liard =

Settlement in Yukon, Canada

Coordinates: 60°03′03″N 128°54′29″W

Upper Liard (pronounced "lee-ahrd") is a chiefly First Nation settlement immediately west of Watson Lake in Canada's Yukon. It is situated at historical mile 642 of the Alaska Highway. Most of the residents are citizens of the Liard River First Nation, who also prominently populate the Two Mile area just north of Watson Lake.

== Demographics ==
Federal census population history of Upper Liard
Year	Pop.	±%
1986	130	—
1991	162	+24.6%
1996	111	−31.5%
2001	159	+43.2%
2006	178	+11.9%
2011	132	−25.8%
2016	125	−5.3%
2021	130	+4.0%
Source: Statistics Canada

In the 2021 Census of Population conducted by Statistics Canada, Upper Liard had a population of 130 living in 55 of its 63 total private dwellings, a change of 4% from its 2016 population of 125. With a land area of 5.56 km^{2} (2.15 sq mi), it had a population density of 23.4/km^{2} (60.6/sq mi) in 2021.
