= List of Yukon territorial highways =

This is a list of territorial highways in the Canadian territory of Yukon. Several are part of the Canadian National Highway System.

Number	Old #	Name	Length (km)	Length (mi)	From	To
Hwy 1	1	Alaska Highway	957.15	594.75	Highway 97 south of Watson Lake	AK-2 at U.S. border east of Alcan Border, AK
Hwy 2	5	South Klondike Highway	133.7	83.1	AK-98 north of Skagway, AK	Hwy 1 southeast of Whitehorse
Hwy 2	2, 3	North Klondike Highway	524	326	Hwy 1 north of Whitehorse	Hwy 9 in Dawson City
Hwy 3	4	Haines Road	175.0	108.7	AK-7 at U.S. border	Hwy 1 in Haines Junction
Hwy 4	9	Robert Campbell Highway	583	362	Hwy 1 in Watson Lake	Hwy 2 in Carmacks
Hwy 5	11	Dempster Highway	465	289	Hwy 2 near Glenboyle	Highway 8 southwest of Fort McPherson, NWT
Hwy 6	8	South Canol Road	219.1	136.1	Hwy 1 in Johnson's Crossing	Hwy 4 south of Ross River
Hwy 6	8	North Canol Road	234.7	145.8	Hwy 4 south of Ross River	Northwest Territories border near Canol Heritage Trail, NWT
Hwy 7	7	Atlin Road	42.4	26.3	Hwy 8 south of Jake's Corner	British Columbia border north of Atlin, BC
Hwy 8	6	Tagish Road	54	34	Hwy 1 in Jake's Corner	Hwy 2 in Carcross
Hwy 9	3	Top of the World Highway	105	65	Hwy 2 in Dawson City	AK-5 near Little Gold Creek
Hwy 10	10	Nahanni Range Road	134	83	Hwy 4 north of Tuchitua	Northwest Territories border near Tungsten, NWT
Hwy 11	2	Silver Trail	110	68	Hwy 2 in Stewart Crossing	Keno City
Hwy 14		Takhini Hot Springs Road	9	5.6	Hwy 2 in Whitehorse	Takhini Hot Springs
Hwy 15		Mitchell Road	10	6.21	Hwy 4 east of Carmacks	Faro
Hwy 37		Cassiar Highway	3.4	2.1	Hwy 1 west of Watson Lake	Highway 37 at British Columbia – Yukon border

== See also ==
- List of Yukon roads
