= Aishihik (disambiguation) =

Aishihik may refer to:

- Aishihik, village of the Southern Tutchone people at the north end of Äshèyi Män (Aishihik Lake) in Yukon
- Aishihik Lake, lake in southwestern Yukon, Canada
- Aishihik River, river in Yukon, Canada
- Aishihik First Nation, First Nation band government in Yukon, Canada
