= Nahanni Range Road =

Highway in Yukon, Canada

Nahanni Range Road
- Yukon Highway 10
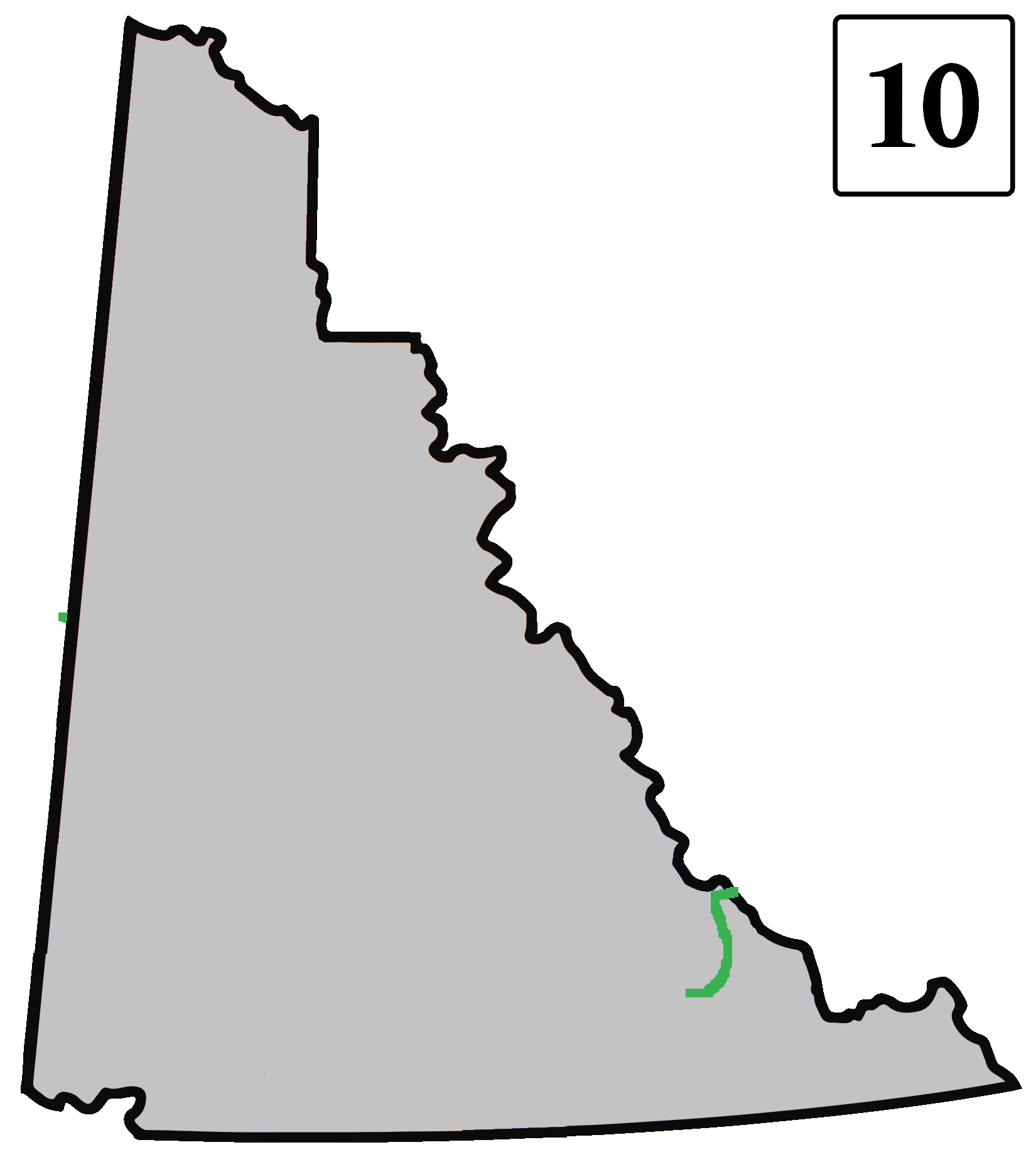

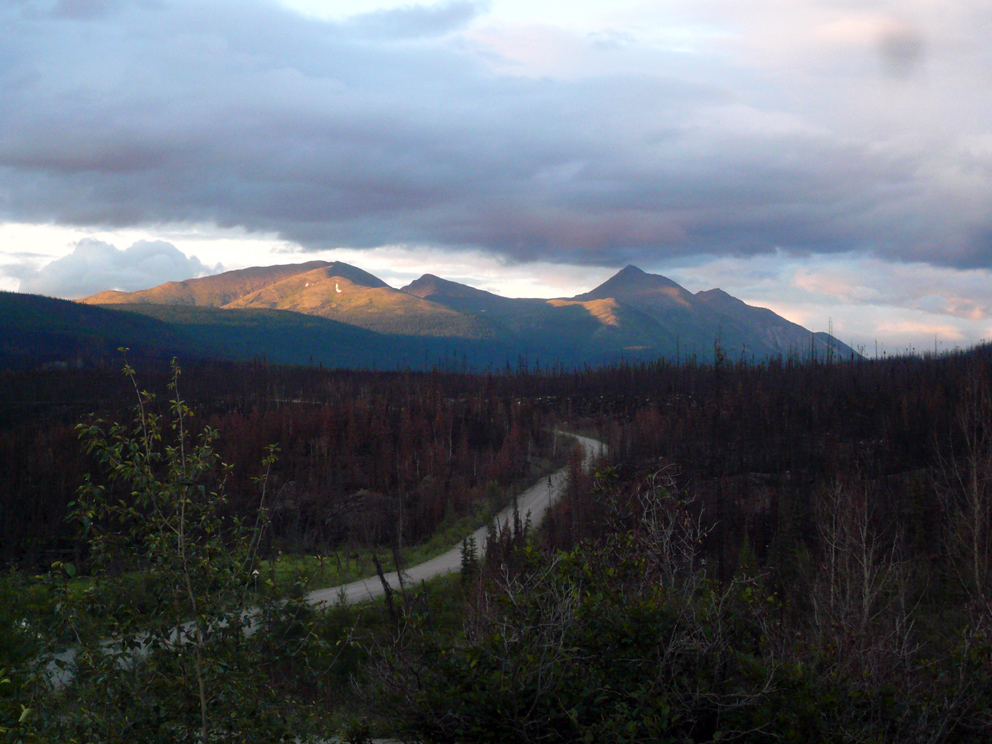
- Nahanni Range Road heading eastwards

Route information
- Maintained by Yukon DOH&PW

Major junctions
- West end: Hwy 4 (Robert Campbell Highway) north of Watson Lake
- East end: Towards Tungsten, NT

Location
- Country: Canada
- Province: Yukon

Highway system
- Territorial highways in Yukon; Miscellaneous
← Hwy 9	→ Hwy 11

The Nahanni Range Road was completed in the early 1960s from Watson Lake, Yukon along the present alignment of the Robert Campbell Highway to Miner Junction (aka Cantung Junction), thence along the Highway 10 route, across the border into the Northwest Territories to the privately owned mining town, Tungsten (for the tungsten mined there), and the Cantung Mine (for Canada Tungsten Mining Corporation). The portion between Cantung Junction and Watson Lake has, since 1971, been part of the Robert Campbell Highway (Yukon Highway 4).

The Nahanni Range Road proper is entirely gravel, and is not recommended for general public use. Originally, two-thirds of the route was maintained by the Yukon government, and had campgrounds for public use. The remaining third was maintained by the mining company, open to public traffic, but with no public facilities at the town. When the mine shut in 1986, the road fell into disuse and maintenance became increasingly difficult. Since the mine resumed intermittent production in 2003, the road has been restored for the use of the mining company, but general public travel is still not advised.

In January 2020, the Yukon Government and the Liard River First Nation announced an agreement for a first phase of repairs. $17 million of federal and territorial tax funds will pay for the replacement of two bridges along Nahanni Range Road.

== See also ==
- List of Yukon territorial highways
