= Top of the World Highway =

Highway between Yukon, Canada and Alaska, United States

Top of the World Highway
- Yukon Highway 9 & Alaska Route 5
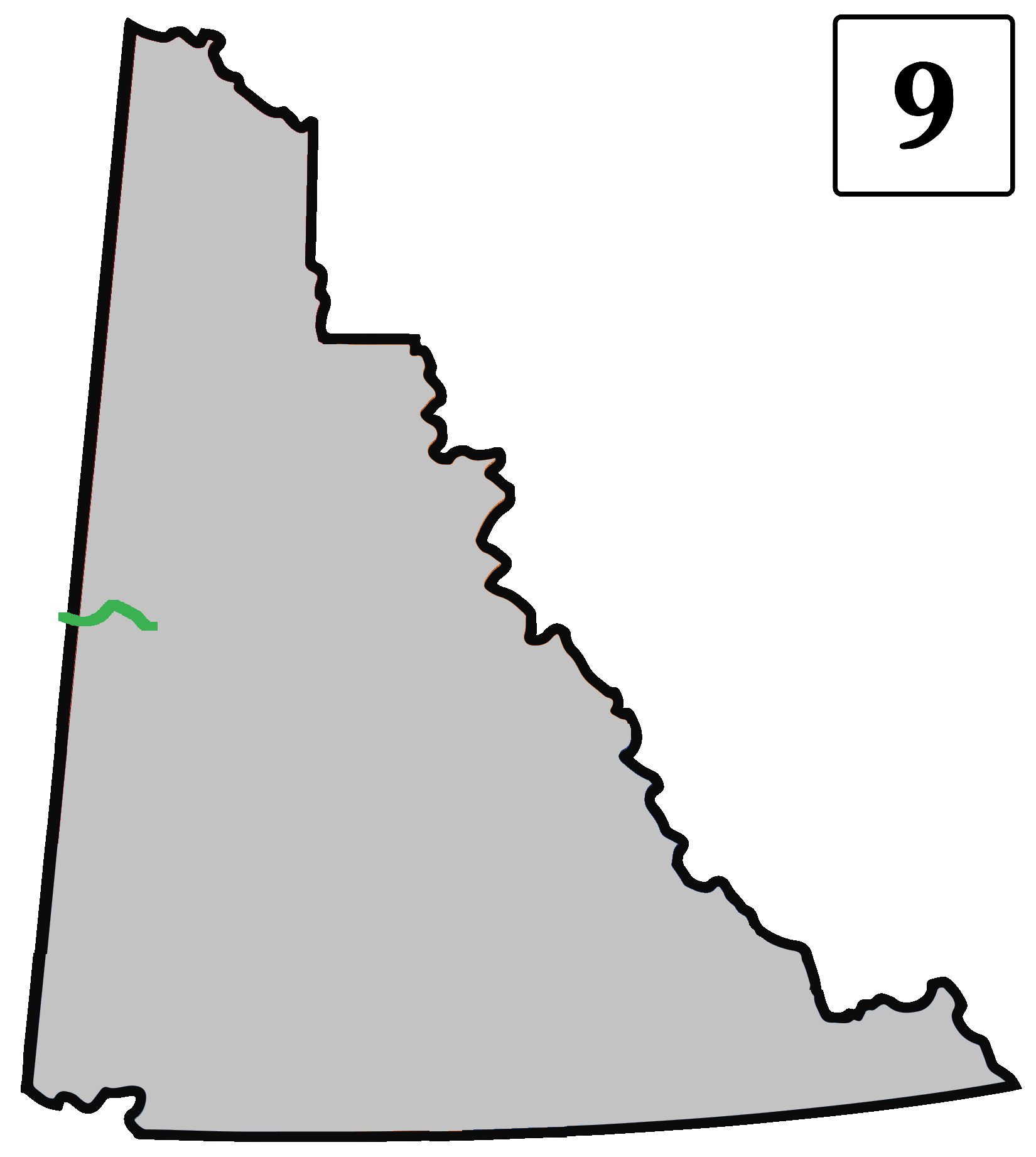

Route information
- Maintained by Department of Highways and Public Works
- Length: 127 km (79 mi)
- Existed: c. 1955–present

Major junctions
- West end: AK-5 (Taylor Highway) near Jack Wade, AK
- East end: To Hwy 2 at the West Dawson ferry terminal

Location
- Country: Canada
- Province: Yukon

Highway system
- Territorial highways in Yukon; Miscellaneous
← Hwy 8	→ Hwy 10

The Top of the World Highway is a 127 km-long (79 mi) highway, beginning at a junction with the Taylor Highway near the unincorporated community of Jack Wade, Alaska travelling east to its terminus at the ferry terminal in West Dawson, Yukon, on the western banks of the Yukon River. The highway has been in existence since at least 1955 and is only open during the summer months. The entire portion of the highway in Yukon is also known as Yukon Highway 9. The Alaska portion is part of Alaska Route 5 and is a portion of the Taylor Highway Scenic Byway.

== Description ==
As of August 2016, the U.S. portion of the highway is paved from the Taylor Highway junction almost as far as Chicken, Alaska, and again for the final 10 kilometres from the Eagle turnoff to the Canada–United States border at Little Gold Creek. Most of the Canadian portion is unpaved. The paved Canadian sections are from kilometre 0 (at Dawson) to km 9 (mile 0 to mi 5.4), km 74 to 76 (mi 46.0 to 47.2), km 79 to 82 (mi 49.1 to 51.0), km 83 to 94 (mi 51.6 to 58.4) and km 99 to 104 (mi 61.5 to 64.6) at the Canada–US border.

The highway is so named because, along much of its length, it skirts the crest of the hills, giving looks down on the valleys. It is also one of the most northerly highways in the world at those latitudes. Two nearby, farther north highways are the Dempster Highway (Yukon Route 5) and the Dalton Highway (Alaska Route 11). It is not particularly safe in winter, even for snowmobile use, due to the lack of trees for shelter.

A ferry connects West Dawson to Dawson in summer, and residents living in West Dawson and nearby Sunnydale cross on the ice during the winter. A bridge is planned by the Yukon government, although there is significant division among Dawson area residents as to whether such a bridge should be built. The west-bank residents received improved phone service only in 2004 but do not have a public electricity supply.

A 50 km (31 mi) branch road off the highway was used to reach the town of Clinton Creek, Yukon, a site of a former asbestos mine that has been shut down since 1979.

== Border ports of entry ==
The Poker Creek–Little Gold Creek Border Crossing features one of the few jointly-built single building customs ports of entry along the Canada–US border. There is a one-hour difference in standard time zones at this border, which is only open in summer during the 8 a.m. to 8 p.m. period (Alaska time). The Border Post has warnings as far south as Whitehorse, Yukon, alerting travelers that the Border is closed between 9pm and 9am (Yukon Time) and there's absolutely no entry between those times. The immense Alaskan Taylor Complex Fire of 2004 burned up to the Canada–US border and was visible from the westernmost portions of the highway.

== Gallery of images ==
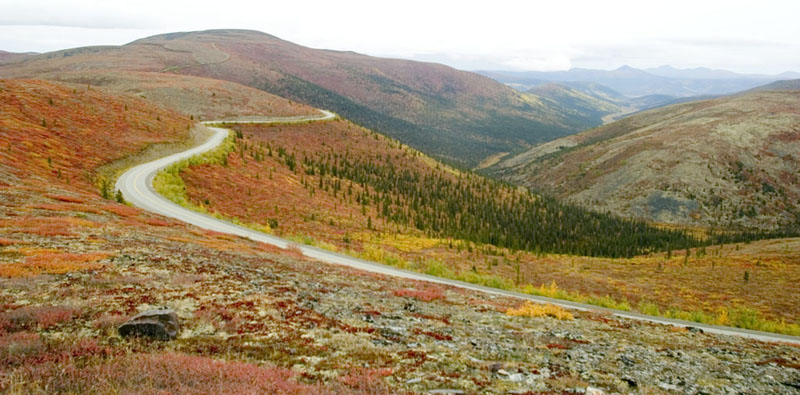
Top of the World Highway near Canada–United States border in September twilight.

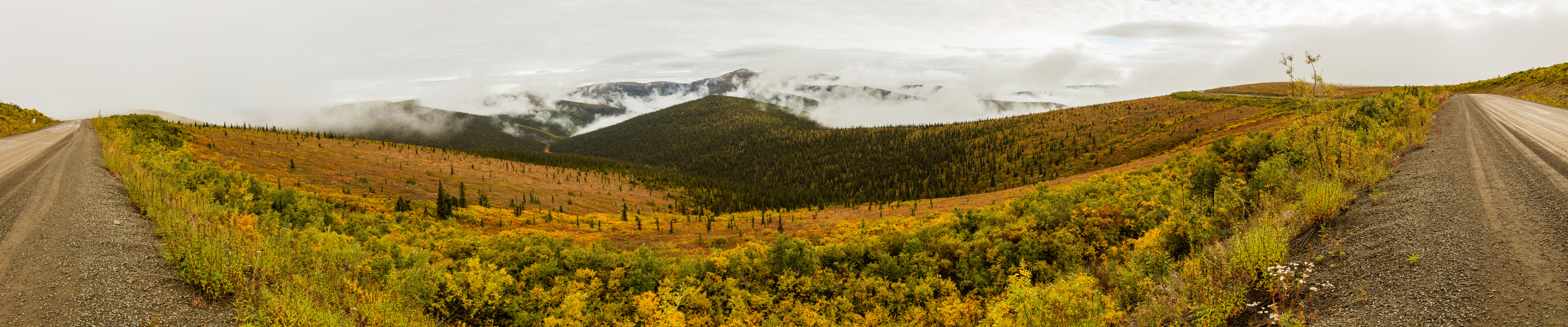
Panoramic view along the highway (Yukon).

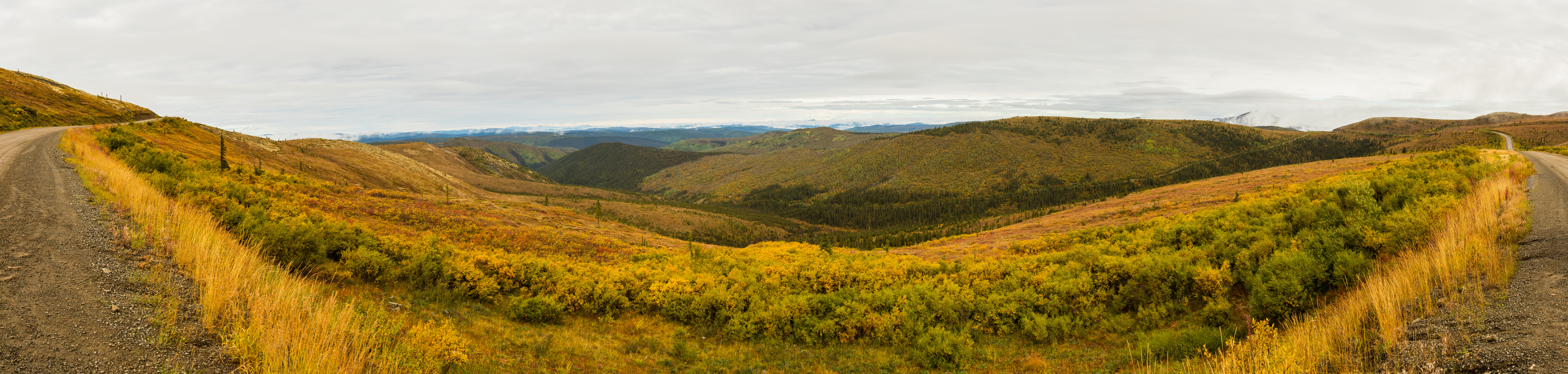
View from the highway (Yukon).

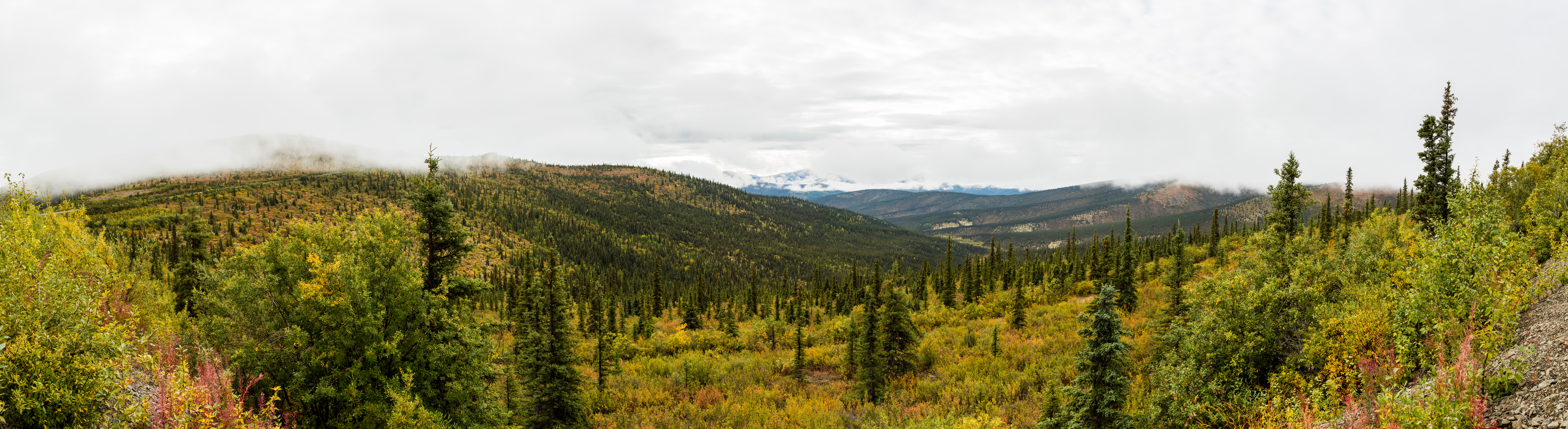
View of the nature (Yukon).

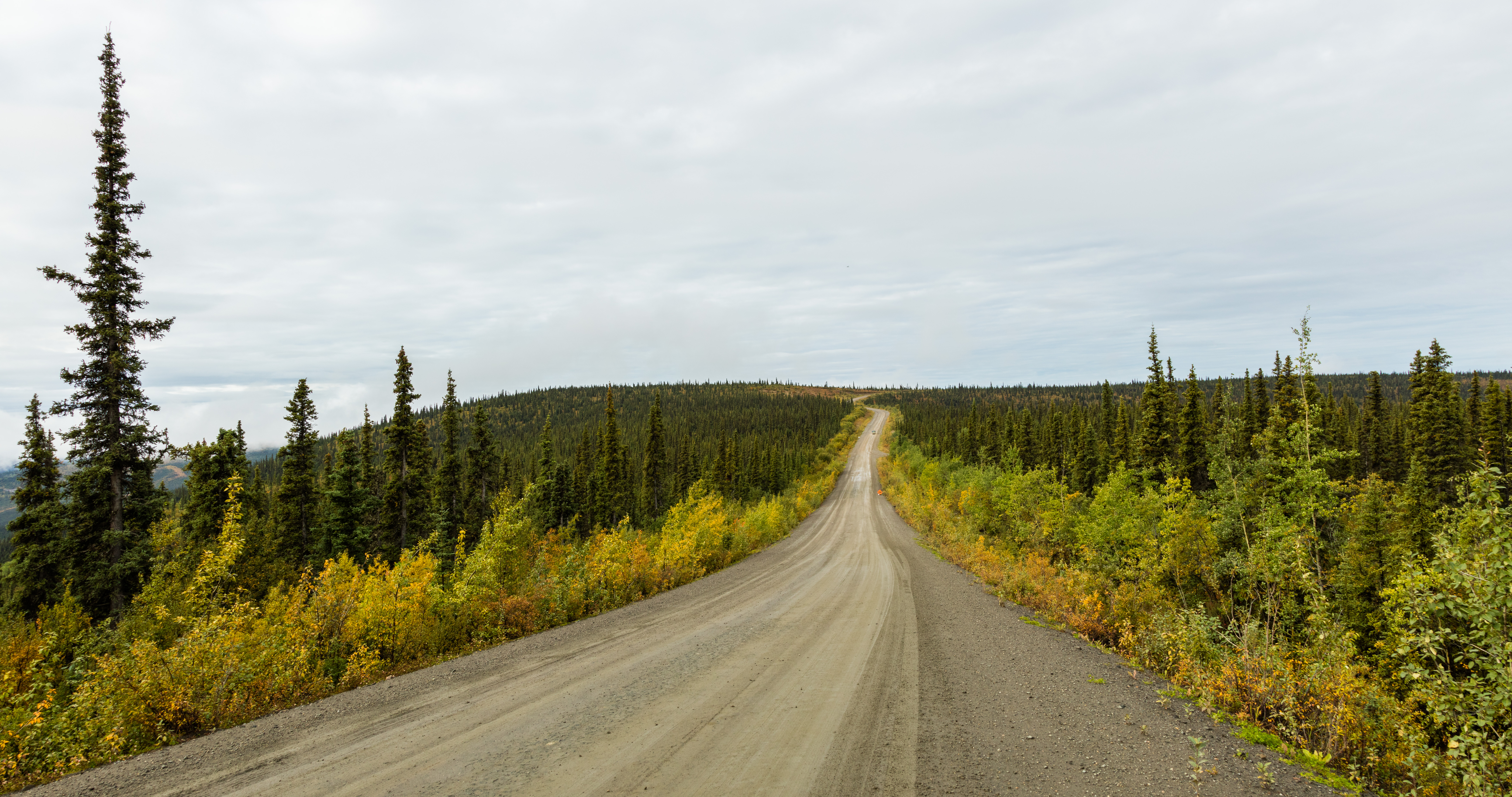
View of the non-paved road in Yukon.

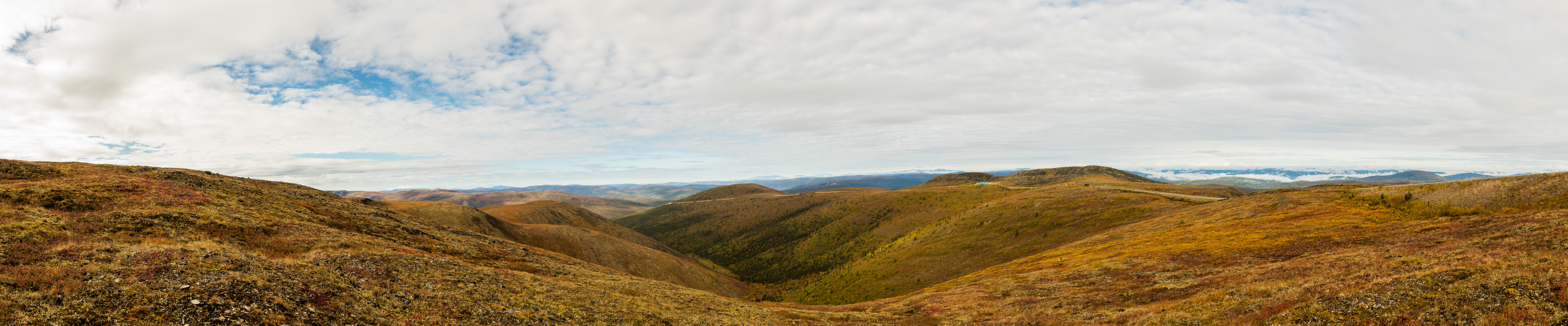
Panorama from the USA-Canada border.
