= Robert Campbell Highway =

Highway in Yukon, Canada

Robert Campbell Highway
- Yukon Highway 4
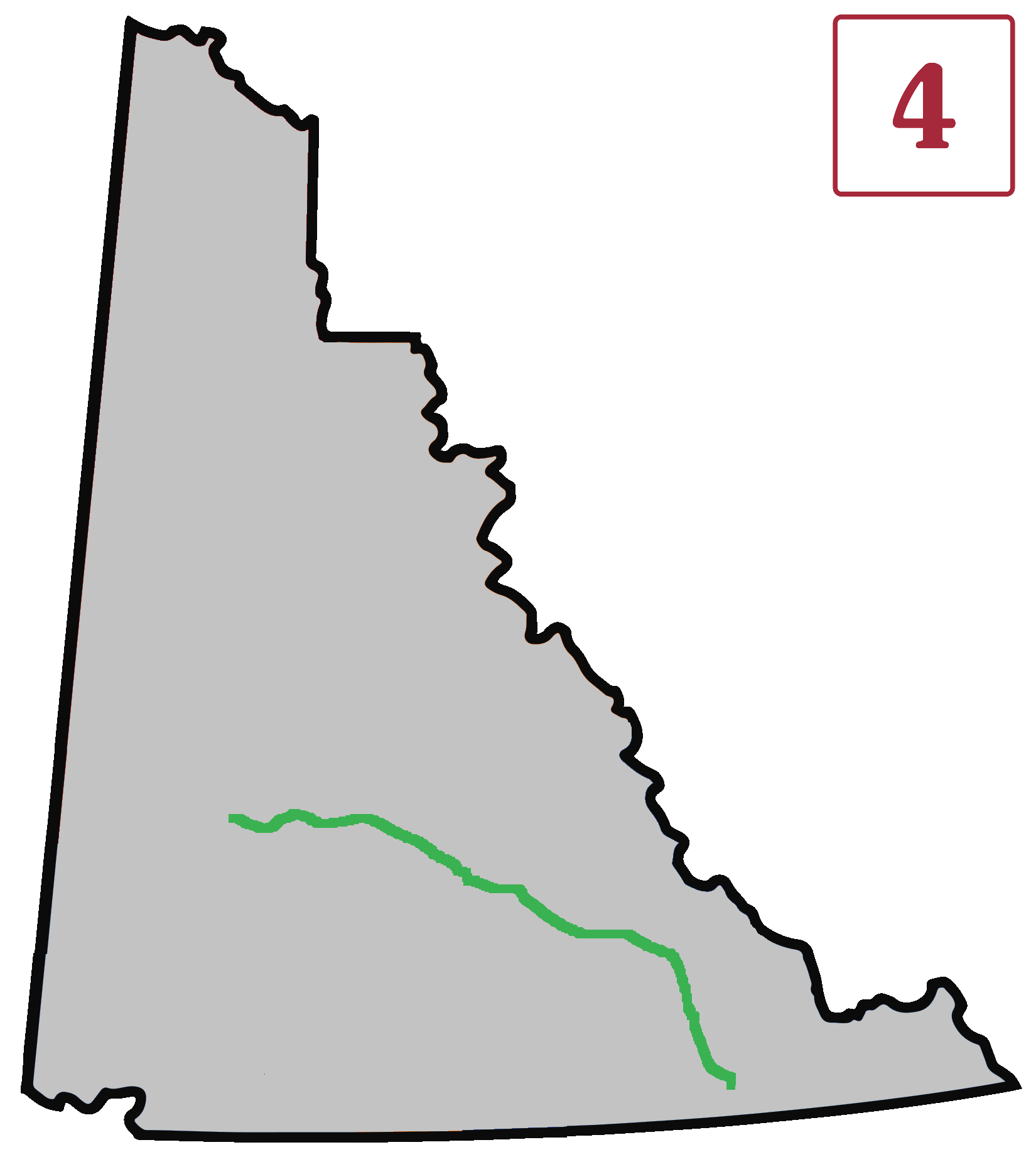

Route information
- Maintained by Yukon DOH&PW
- Length: 362 mi (583 km)

Major junctions
- West end: Hwy 2 (Klondike Highway) in Carmacks, YT
- Hwy 6 (Canol Road) in Ross River, YT; Hwy 10 (Nahanni Range Road)
- East end: Hwy 1 (Alaska Highway) in Watson Lake, YT

Location
- Country: Canada
- Province: Yukon

Highway system
- Territorial highways in Yukon; Miscellaneous
← Hwy 3	→ Hwy 5

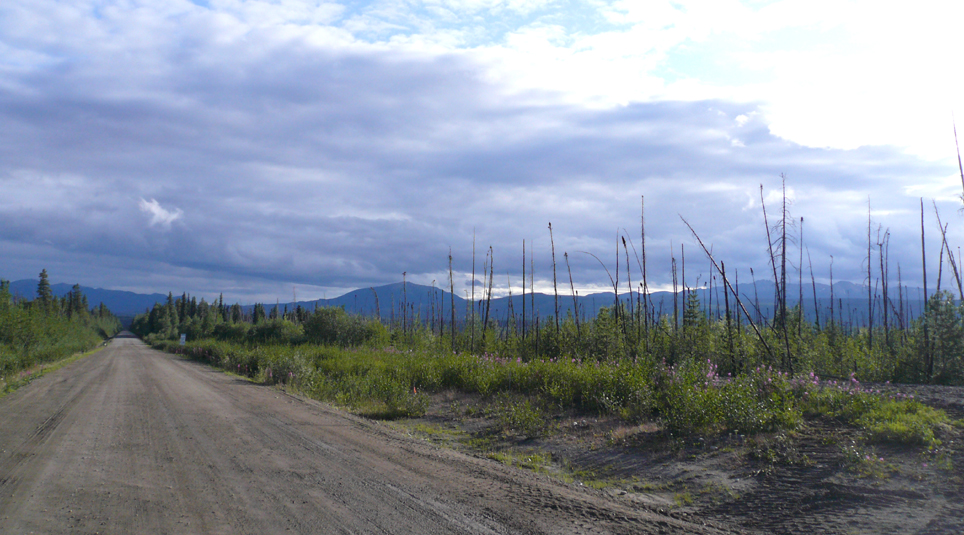
Campbell Highway near Simpson Lake

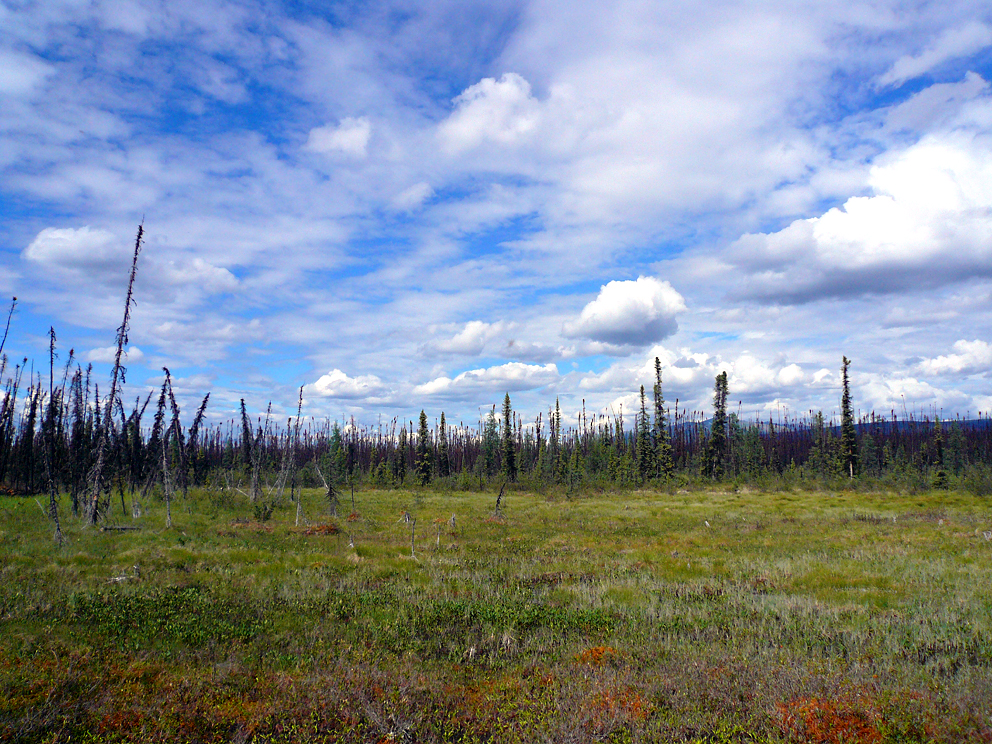
Permafrost bush along The Campbell Highway

Yukon Highway 4, also known as the Robert Campbell Highway or Campbell Highway, is a road between Watson Lake, Yukon on the Alaska Highway to Carmacks, Yukon on the Klondike Highway. It is 583 km (362 mi) long and mostly gravel-surfaced. It serves the communities of Faro and Ross River and intersects the Canol Road near Ross River. The highway is named for Robert Campbell, a nineteenth century Hudson's Bay Company fur trader and explorer.

The first portion of the Robert Campbell Highway, between Watson Lake and Miner Junction, was built in the early 1960s as part of the project to complete road access to Tungsten, Northwest Territories. The portion east and north of Miner Junction is now the only portion still known as the Nahanni Range Road, and is Yukon Territorial Highway #10.

During the late 1960s and continuing to 1971, highways were built to connect Carmacks with Ross River, with a spur road to Faro to serve the new lead-zinc mine that opened in 1969. Additional road work was also completed between Ross River and Miner Junction. The completed road complements the Canol Road, providing two loops and bringing year-round access to Ross River.

The Campbell Highway is mostly gravel, and the most improved section is between Carmacks and Faro, where it has the most traffic from trucks hauling ore to Whitehorse and beyond.

The highway was originally route 9, but became route 4 in 1978. For travellers from the south whose destination is Dawson City, this route is some 20 miles shorter than going through Whitehorse. However, many area users consider the route inferior, usually narrow, and sometimes hazardous.

== See also ==
- List of Yukon territorial highways
