= Aishihik =

Southern Tutchone village in Yukon, Canada

Coordinates: 61°34′N 137°30′W

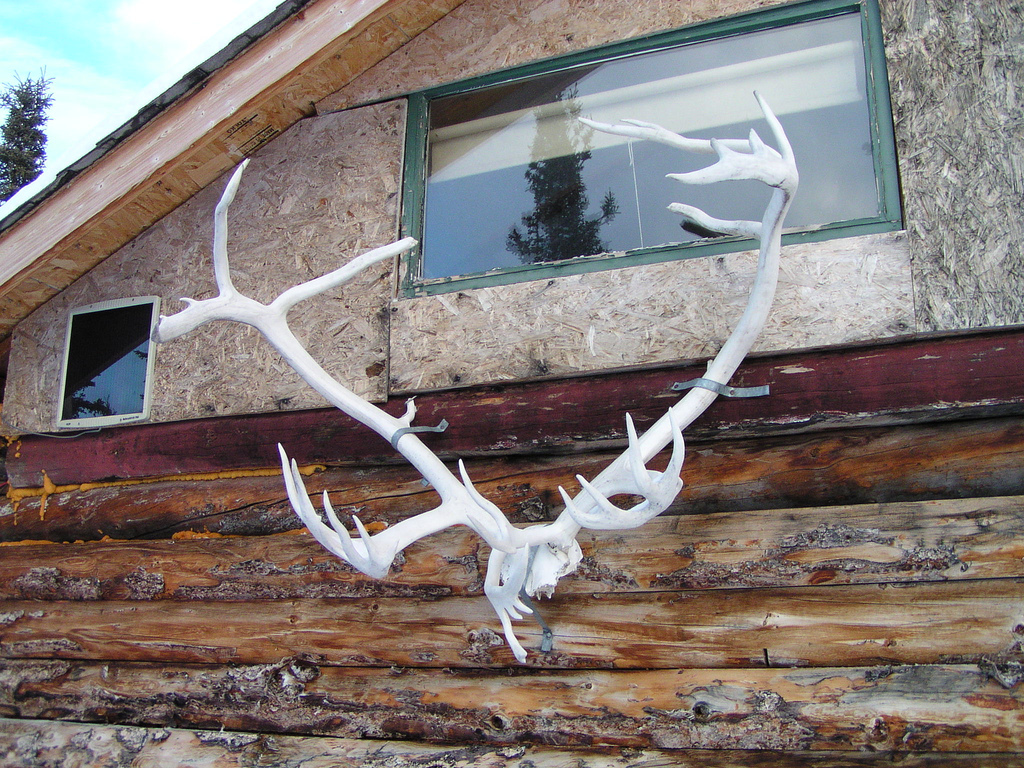
Caribou antlers on cabin in Aishihik, Yukon

Aishihik (Also known as Äshèyi) is a village of the Southern Tutchone people at the north end of Äshèyi Män (Aishihik Lake) in Yukon. It continues to be the home of the Äshèyi people. Champagne and Aishihik First Nations continue to use it for traditional purposes

A military airfield was established here during World War II as part of the Northwest Staging Route. It was operated until 1968, and the withdrawal of military service led to the community's depopulation, except for a small number of Champagne and Aishihik First Nations people. It is 135 km (84 mi) from the Alaska Highway on the Aishihik Road, most of which is no longer maintained.

== Climate ==
Aishihik has a subarctic climate (Köppen climate classification Dfc).

Climate data for Aishihik
Month	Jan	Feb	Mar	Apr	May	Jun	Jul	Aug	Sep	Oct	Nov	Dec	Year
Record high °C (°F)	7 (45)	7 (45)	7 (45)	10 (50)	28 (82)	30 (86)	30 (86)	26 (79)	22 (72)	15 (59)	9 (48)	5 (41)	30 (86)
Mean daily maximum °C (°F)	−15 (5)	−10 (14)	−3 (27)	2 (36)	11 (52)	17 (63)	18 (64)	16 (61)	11 (52)	2 (36)	−8 (18)	−13 (9)	2 (36)
Daily mean °C (°F)	−21 (−6)	−17 (1)	−11 (12)	−4 (25)	5 (41)	10 (50)	11 (52)	9 (48)	5 (41)	−2 (28)	−13 (9)	−19 (−2)	1 (34)
Mean daily minimum °C (°F)	−27 (−17)	−24 (−11)	−19 (−2)	−10 (14)	−1 (30)	3 (37)	5 (41)	3 (37)	−1 (30)	−7 (19)	−18 (0)	−25 (−13)	−10 (14)
Record low °C (°F)	−52 (−62)	−56 (−69)	−46 (−51)	−37 (−35)	−14 (7)	−5 (23)	−3 (27)	−8 (18)	−20 (−4)	−23 (−9)	−47 (−53)	−50 (−58)	−56 (−69)
Average precipitation mm (inches)	10 (0.4)	10 (0.4)	10 (0.4)	10 (0.4)	20 (0.8)	40 (1.6)	40 (1.6)	30 (1.2)	20 (0.8)	10 (0.4)	10 (0.4)	10 (0.4)	250 (9.8)
Average snowfall cm (inches)	14 (5.5)	8 (3.1)	12 (4.7)	11 (4.3)	6 (2.4)	0 (0)	0 (0)	0 (0)	6 (2.4)	12 (4.7)	13 (5.1)	11 (4.3)	97 (38)
Average rainy days	1	1	1	1	3	4	4	3	2	2	2	1	30
Average relative humidity (%)	75	76	73	70	66	69	75	73	79	78	78	76	74
Source: Weatherbase
