= Otter Falls (Yukon) =

Waterfall on the Aishihik River in Yukon, Canada

Coordinates: 61°4′49.8″N 136°59′41.6″W

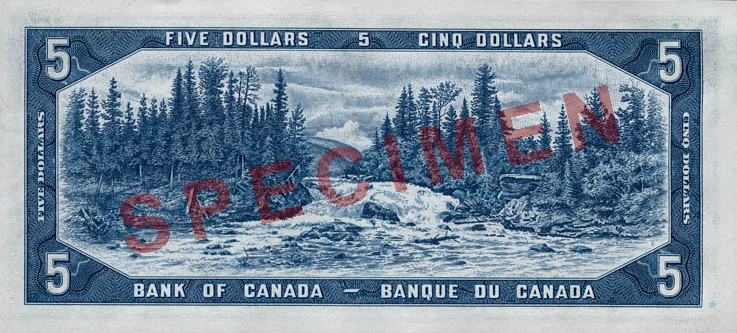
The $5 banknote of the 1954 Series depicts Otter Falls. The engraving was created by C. Gordon Yorke.

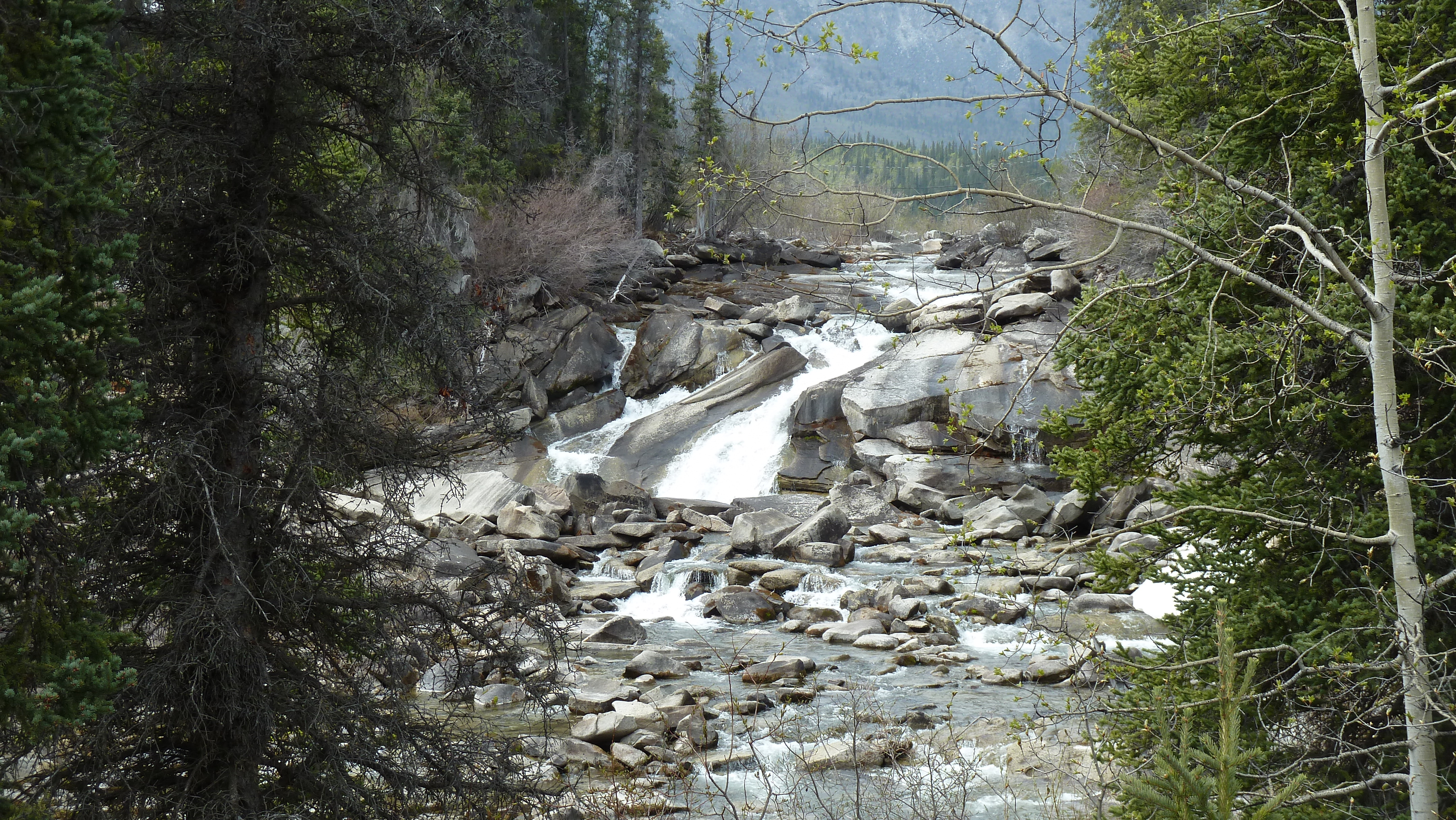
Otter Falls

Otter Falls (Southern Tutchone: Nadélin) is located on the Aishihik River in southwestern Yukon, a territory of Canada.

Accessible via the Aishihik Road (see Miscellaneous Yukon roads), the site of the falls has long been visited by lovers of the outdoors due to its picturesque nature, bird life (American dipper and harlequin duck amongst others) and sport fishing opportunities. An engraved scene of Otter Falls at mile 996 of the Alaska Highway, created by C. Gordon Yorke, is depicted on the $5 banknote of the 1954 Series of banknotes of the Canadian dollar.

== Climate ==
Climate data for Otter Falls
Month	Jan	Feb	Mar	Apr	May	Jun	Jul	Aug	Sep	Oct	Nov	Dec	Year
Record high °C (°F)	9.0 (48.2)	10.5 (50.9)	12.0 (53.6)	21.5 (70.7)	31.0 (87.8)	30.0 (86.0)	29.5 (85.1)	30.0 (86.0)	23.5 (74.3)	22.0 (71.6)	10.0 (50.0)	9.0 (48.2)	31.0 (87.8)
Mean daily maximum °C (°F)	−11.2 (11.8)	−6.3 (20.7)	−1.1 (30.0)	5.5 (41.9)	12.3 (54.1)	17.4 (63.3)	19.1 (66.4)	16.8 (62.2)	11.4 (52.5)	3.1 (37.6)	−7.2 (19.0)	−9.1 (15.6)	4.2 (39.6)
Daily mean °C (°F)	−16.1 (3.0)	−12.2 (10.0)	−7.7 (18.1)	−0.7 (30.7)	5.9 (42.6)	10.9 (51.6)	13.0 (55.4)	10.8 (51.4)	5.8 (42.4)	−1.5 (29.3)	−11.7 (10.9)	−13.7 (7.3)	−1.4 (29.5)
Mean daily minimum °C (°F)	−21.0 (−5.8)	−18.0 (−0.4)	−14.3 (6.3)	−6.9 (19.6)	−0.5 (31.1)	4.4 (39.9)	6.8 (44.2)	4.8 (40.6)	0.0 (32.0)	−5.9 (21.4)	−16.2 (2.8)	−18.3 (−0.9)	−7.1 (19.2)
Record low °C (°F)	−46.0 (−50.8)	−41.0 (−41.8)	−36.0 (−32.8)	−30.0 (−22.0)	−15.0 (5.0)	−3.5 (25.7)	−1.0 (30.2)	−4.0 (24.8)	−17.5 (0.5)	−31.5 (−24.7)	−39.0 (−38.2)	−42.0 (−43.6)	−46.0 (−50.8)
Average precipitation mm (inches)	16.2 (0.64)	13.2 (0.52)	12.2 (0.48)	8.5 (0.33)	21.0 (0.83)	43.7 (1.72)	54.5 (2.15)	43.1 (1.70)	31.0 (1.22)	23.5 (0.93)	17.0 (0.67)	14.7 (0.58)	298.6 (11.76)
Source: Environment Canada

== See also ==
- List of waterfalls
- List of waterfalls in Canada
