= Tungsten, Northwest Territories =

Abandoned company town in the Northwest Territories, Canada

Coordinates: 61°57′25″N 128°12′10″W

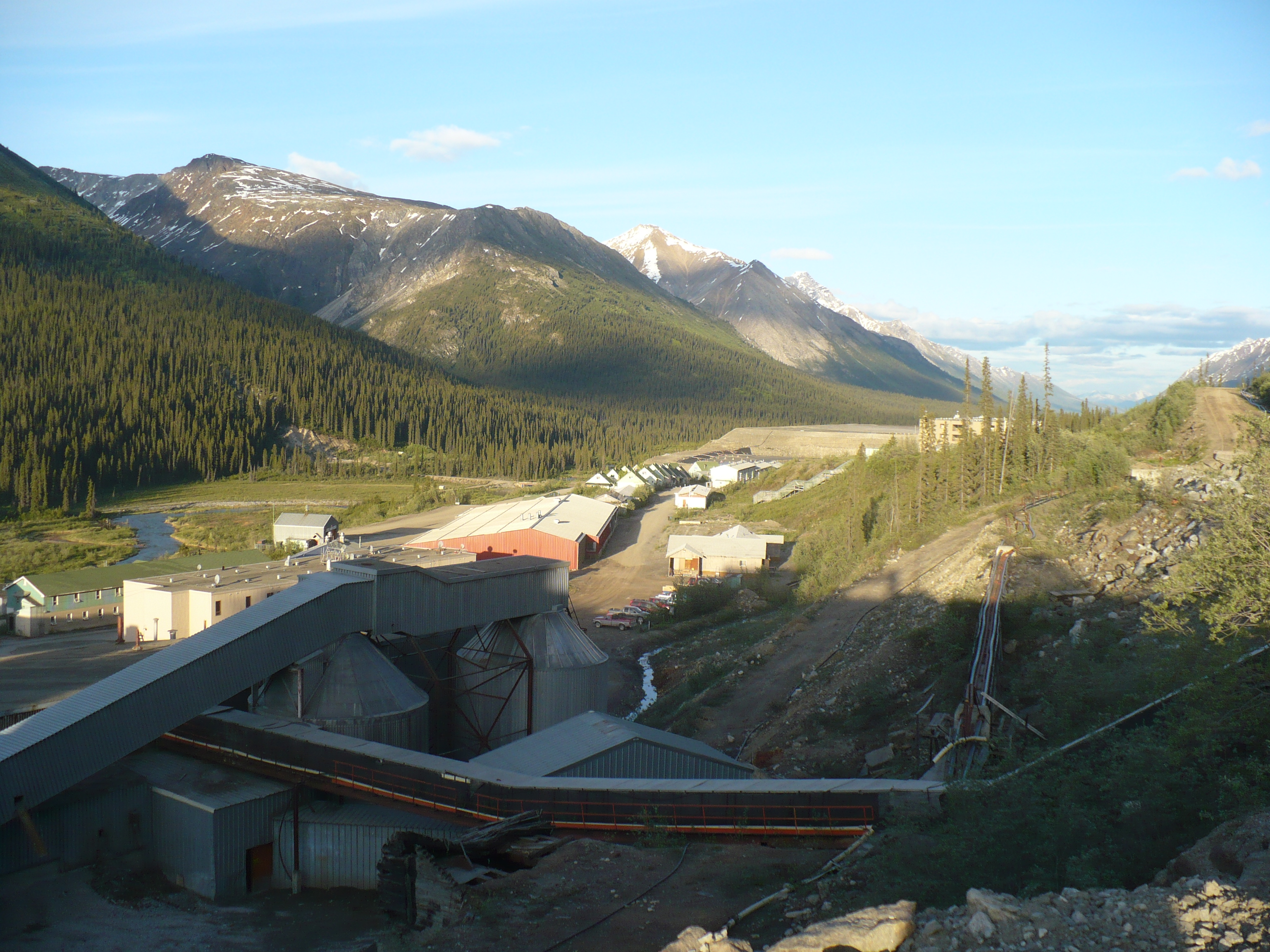
Tungsten, NWT

The townsite of Tungsten (shown as Cantung on some maps) is located at Cantung Mine in the Northwest Territories. It is accessible from Watson Lake, Yukon via the Nahanni Range Road.

== History ==
Federal census population history of Tungsten
Year	Pop.	±%
1976	229	—
1981	320	+39.7%
1986	238	−25.6%
Source: Statistics Canada

Tungsten was built in 1961 and the tungsten mine went into operation in 1962 as a large open-pit mine in the Mackenzie Mountains. It originally consisted of several small bungalow houses. Total population of Tungsten during the 1960s was approximately 120 persons, including about 27 families. In 1968 families were housed in 28 units (single and duplex housing).

Because of extremely good wages and benefits, turnover rates for the entire operation were quite low. Families benefited from the K-8 Grade school, and later a K-9 system. During the summer months, because of the open pit operation, manpower and townsite population grew to 160. In the mid-1970s, the townsite expanded to include a trailer court, three condominiums, bunkhouse trailers, and in 1982, a modern recreation complex. An 80-man bunkhouse was added in 1983. The town and mine were serviced by an all-weather road to Watson Lake and the, still open, Tungsten (Cantung) Airport, with a single runway measuring 4,127 ft × 100 ft (1,258 m × 30 m).

The community also had a public telephone exchange operated by Northwestel: area code 403, prefix 777. The Cantung Mine closed in May 1986, and the townsite was closed. A year or two later, the telephone exchange, with only a handful of active lines on obsolescent electromechanical equipment, was shut down.

Although the mine reopened in 2002, the nature of the mine had changed so that there was no longer an operating townsite with families. The mine closed again in 2003. Following an investment by the Yukon based Kaska Dena Council in December 2004 the mine was reopened in 2005. The original bungalow houses remain to this day along with the school.

== Geography ==
The community had the distinction of being the only place in the Northwest Territories that was on Pacific Time (used in Yukon) rather than Mountain Time.

=== Climate ===
Tungsten has a subarctic climate (Dfc) with long, severely cold winters and short but mild and rainy summers.

Climate data for Tungsten
Month	Jan	Feb	Mar	Apr	May	Jun	Jul	Aug	Sep	Oct	Nov	Dec	Year
Record high °C (°F)	3.5 (38.3)	7.8 (46.0)	8.0 (46.4)	14.4 (57.9)	24.0 (75.2)	28.3 (82.9)	26.7 (80.1)	27.8 (82.0)	24.4 (75.9)	11.0 (51.8)	4.4 (39.9)	5.0 (41.0)	28.3 (82.9)
Mean daily maximum °C (°F)	−17.2 (1.0)	−12.7 (9.1)	—	—	—	—	—	—	—	—	−11.0 (12.2)	—	—
Mean daily minimum °C (°F)	—	—	—	—	—	—	—	—	—	—	−19.8 (−3.6)	−23.6 (−10.5)	—
Record low °C (°F)	−51.0 (−59.8)	−48.3 (−54.9)	−42.2 (−44.0)	−38.0 (−36.4)	−16.7 (1.9)	−4.0 (24.8)	−0.6 (30.9)	−8.0 (17.6)	−18.3 (−0.9)	−32.0 (−25.6)	−42.0 (−43.6)	−50.0 (−58.0)	−51.0 (−59.8)
Average precipitation mm (inches)	41.8 (1.65)	32.3 (1.27)	33.1 (1.30)	—	—	61.8 (2.43)	87.4 (3.44)	83.0 (3.27)	64.1 (2.52)	—	50.0 (1.97)	32.9 (1.30)	—
Source: 1961-1990 Environment Canada

== See also ==
- Mactung mine
