= Sign Post Forest =

Landmark in Watson Lake, Yukon

Coordinates: 60°03′48″N 128°42′52″W

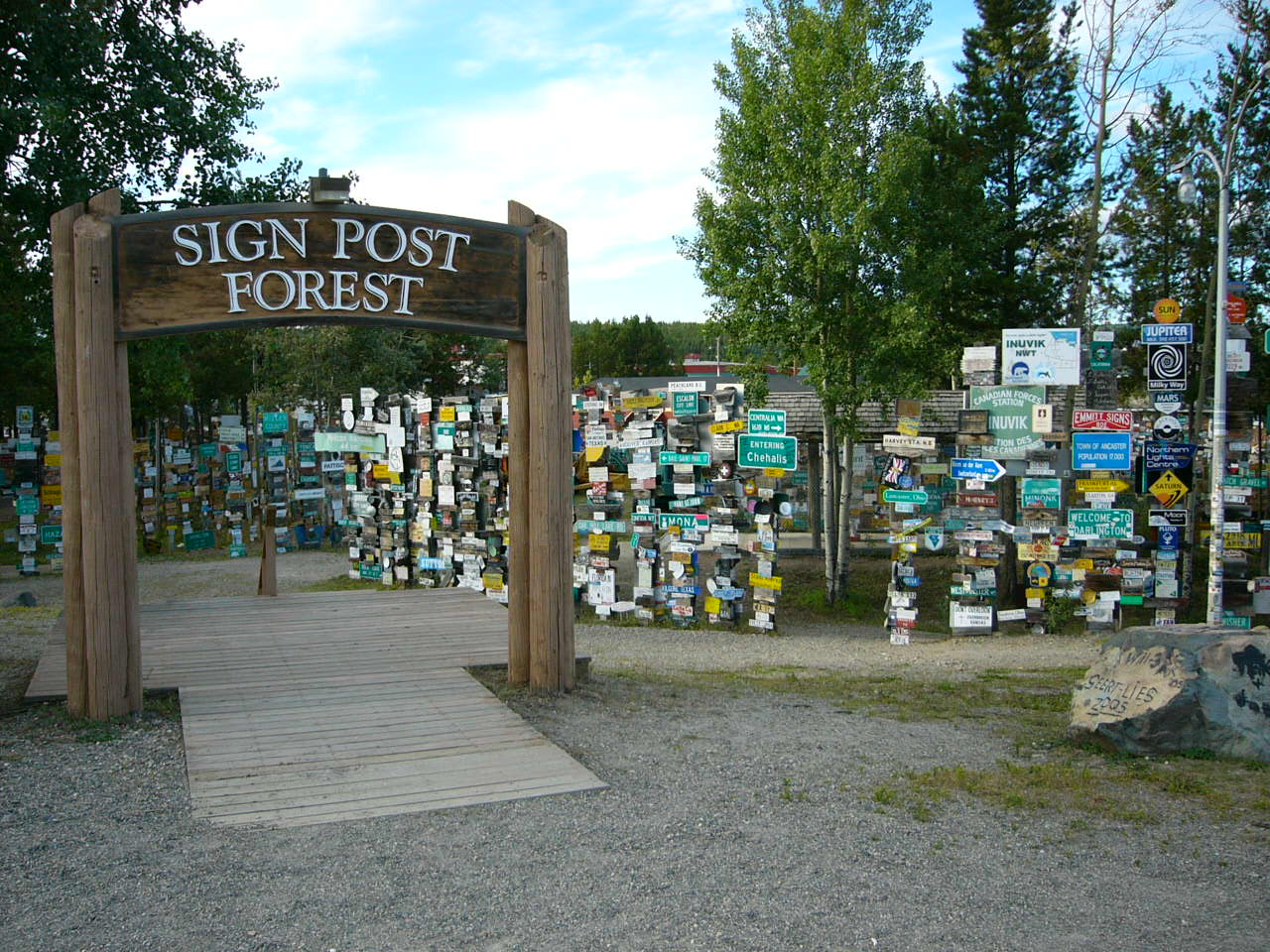
Sign Post Forest, 2005

Sign Post Forest is a collection of signs at Watson Lake, Yukon, Canada, and is one of the most famous of the landmarks along the Alaska Highway. It was started by a homesick GI in 1942. He was assigned light duty while recovering from an injury and erected the signpost for his hometown: Danville, Ill. 2835 miles. Visitors may add their own signs to the more than 100,000 already present.

== Origin ==
In 1942, a simple sign post pointing out the distances to various points along the tote road being built was damaged by a bulldozer. Private Carl K. Lindley, serving with the 341st Engineers, was ordered to repair the sign, and decided to personalize the job by adding a sign pointing towards his home town, Danville, Illinois, and giving the distance to it. Several other people added directions to their home towns, and the idea has been snowballing ever since.

== The forest today ==
The Sign Post Forest takes up a couple of acres, with huge new panels being constantly added, snaking through the trees. There are street signs, welcome signs, signatures on dinner plates, and license plates from around the world.

In June 2012, the stage in the centre of the forest was the site of an impromptu performance of the play Two Women on a Precipice. The playwright Karin Fazio Littlefield was delayed in attending the Last Frontier Theatre Conference in Valdez, Alaska, by mudslides on the Alaska Highway. Littlefield and her fellow actors performed the piece for travellers who were likewise stranded in Watson Lake by the mudslides.

== Gallery ==
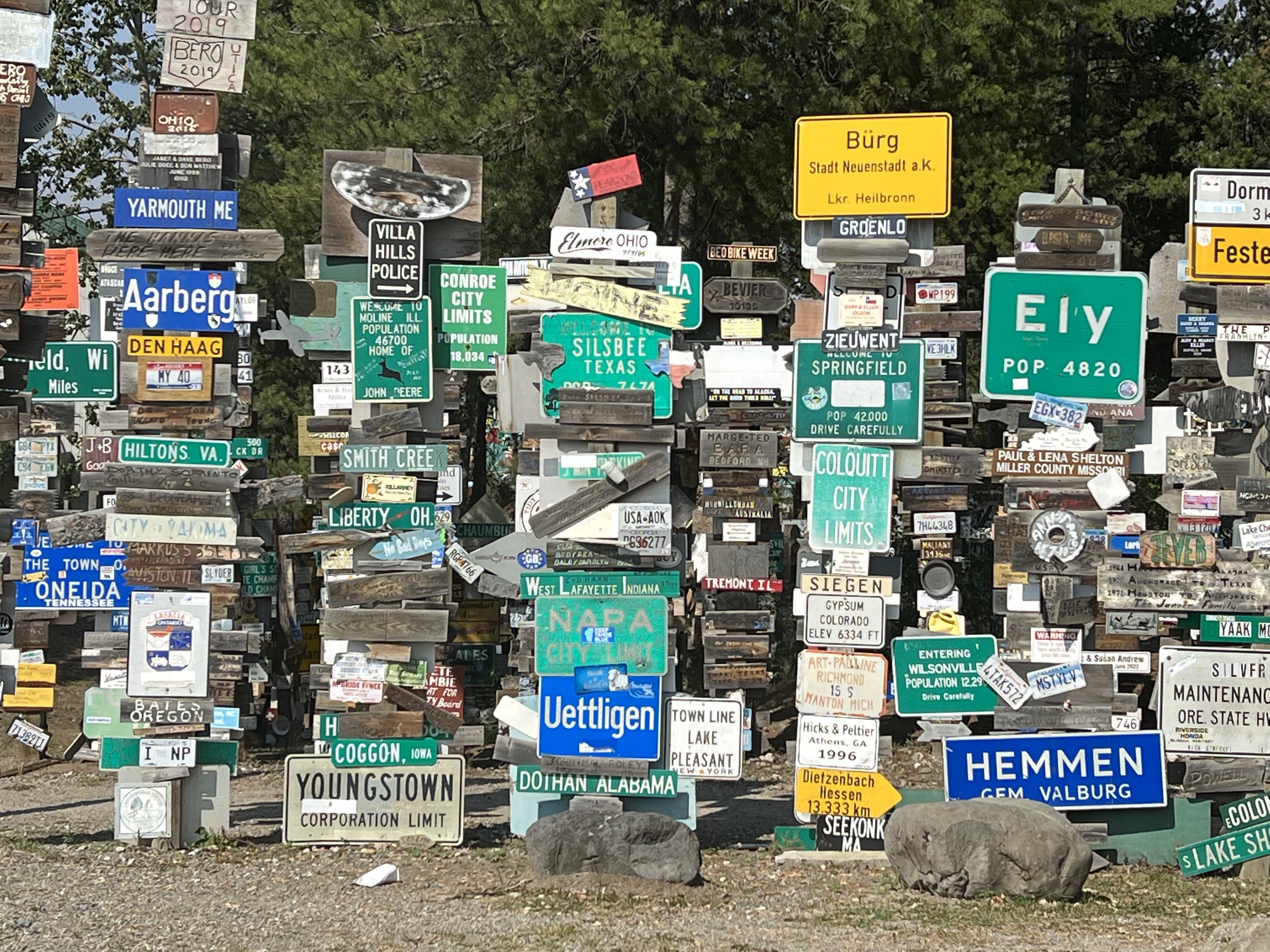
Portion of the Sign Post Forest, July 2022
