= Cantung Mine =

Tungsten mine in Northwest Territories, Canada

Coordinates: 61°57′25″N 128°12′10″W

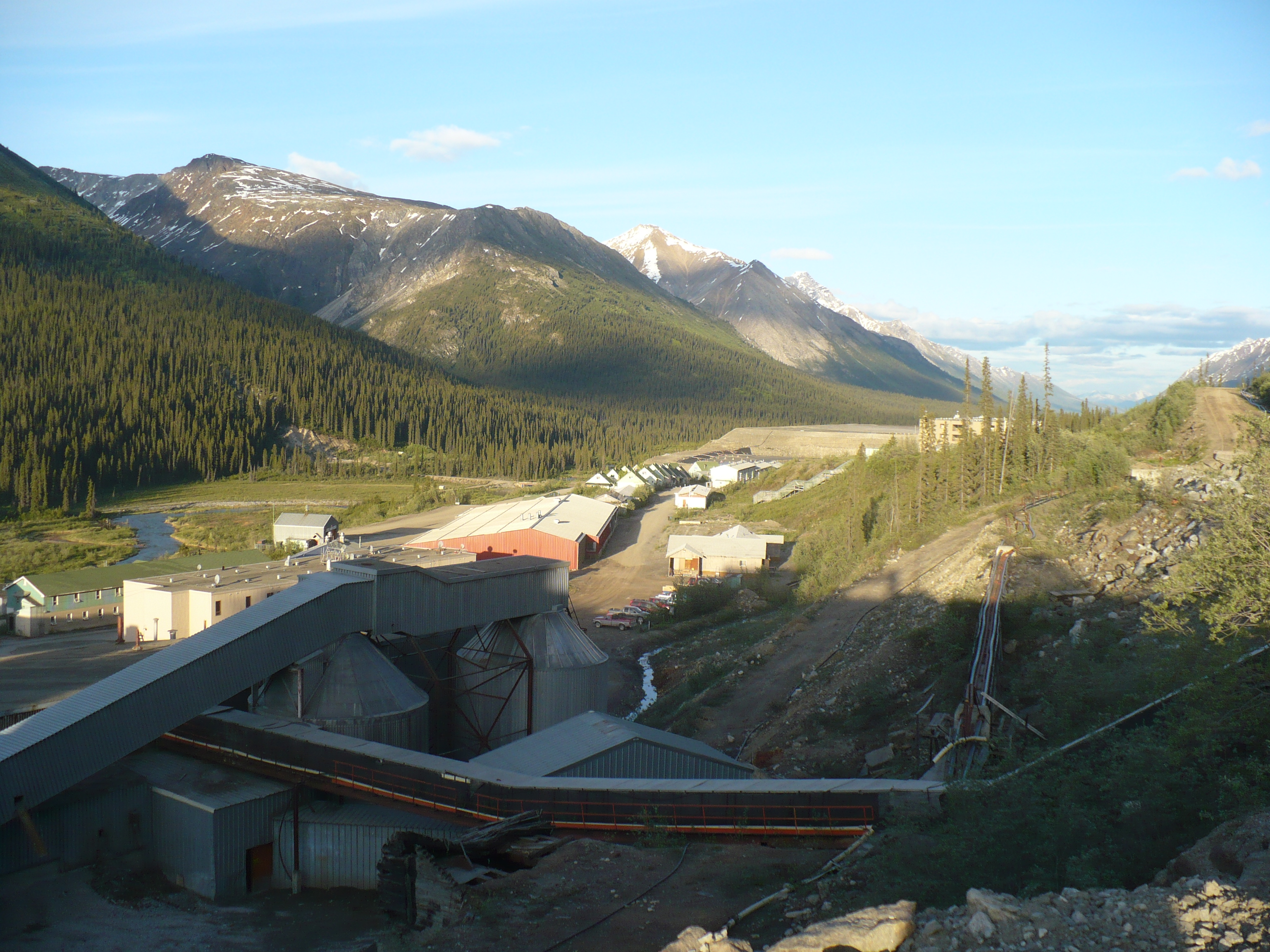
Cantung Mine

Cantung Mine is a tungsten producer in the Nahanni area of the Northwest Territories, Canada, located northeast of Watson Lake in the Flat River Valley of the Selwyn Range close to the Yukon border. Tungsten was originally discovered in the area in 1954 by prospectors. Cantung Mine operated from 1962 to 1986, again from 2002 to 2003, and from 2005. Production was suspended from October 2009 to October 2010. The mine owner, North American Tungsten Corporation, went bankrupt in 2015 and the mine closed in October of that year. The federal government of Canada now owns the mine and has to clean up the site. As of December, 2017, the mine remained closed, with the possibility of being opened to process a nearby lithium deposit. As of February 2019, the mine is still closed; the federal and NWT governments are trying to sell it.

== 1962—1986 ==
The original company that developed the mine was Canada Tungsten Mining Corporation Limited, with Cantung being a short abbreviated form of the company name. The small community of Tungsten was established for workers and their families along with the small, still open, Tungsten (Cantung) Airport. It was an open-pit operation until 1974 when the newly discovered underground deposit was brought to production. It closed due to low tungsten prices in 1986. It was purchased by North American Tungsten Corporation of Vancouver in 1997. Stephen Leahy, Chair and CEO, recognized the potential for Cantung tungsten production because 85% of the world's tungsten reserves are in China:

I just had to believe that at some point in time, something was going to happen -- and of course several years ago China passed a law against exporting raw material tungsten. They are moving up the value chain. They want to do the refining in the first state. Pretty soon they will want to sell you the finished goods, the saw blades, the drill bits. If you in the West have no raw material, how are you going to make those things?"

— Stephen Leahy, 2007

== 2002—2003 ==
With higher prices in the new millennium, the new owner, North American Tungsten Corporation, reopened the mine for production in 2002. The mine again closed in 2003 when the company's creditors recalled their loans, putting the company on the verge of bankruptcy.

== 2005—present ==
After a re-finance, the mine reopened September 1, 2005. By November 2007, North American Tungsten stated that Cantung had approximately two years of tungsten reserves left, but combined with its Mactung mine operation, the two hold 15% of the world's known tungsten. Leahy is optimistic:

We've seen the price rise from $50 a unit (22 kilograms) to $250 a unit in two-and-a-half years... This mine started in the early 1960s and it has been taken care of quite well, but you are still dealing with very old equipment... China used to say it had an infinite amount of tungsten. Then a few years ago they said they had about 100 years' supply at the current rate. Then last year at the tungsten conference [China] said they were less than 20 years and they better start looking. Their grade has been dropping as mines mature. They haven't been reinvesting. They have environmental issues, and you can't just bring a mine on in two months. Even over there it takes years. Their costs are rising, as ours are.

— Stephen Leahy, 2007, Having patience pays off in mining tungsten
