= Aishihik River =

River in Canada

Coordinates: 60°50′11.3″N 137°5′17″W

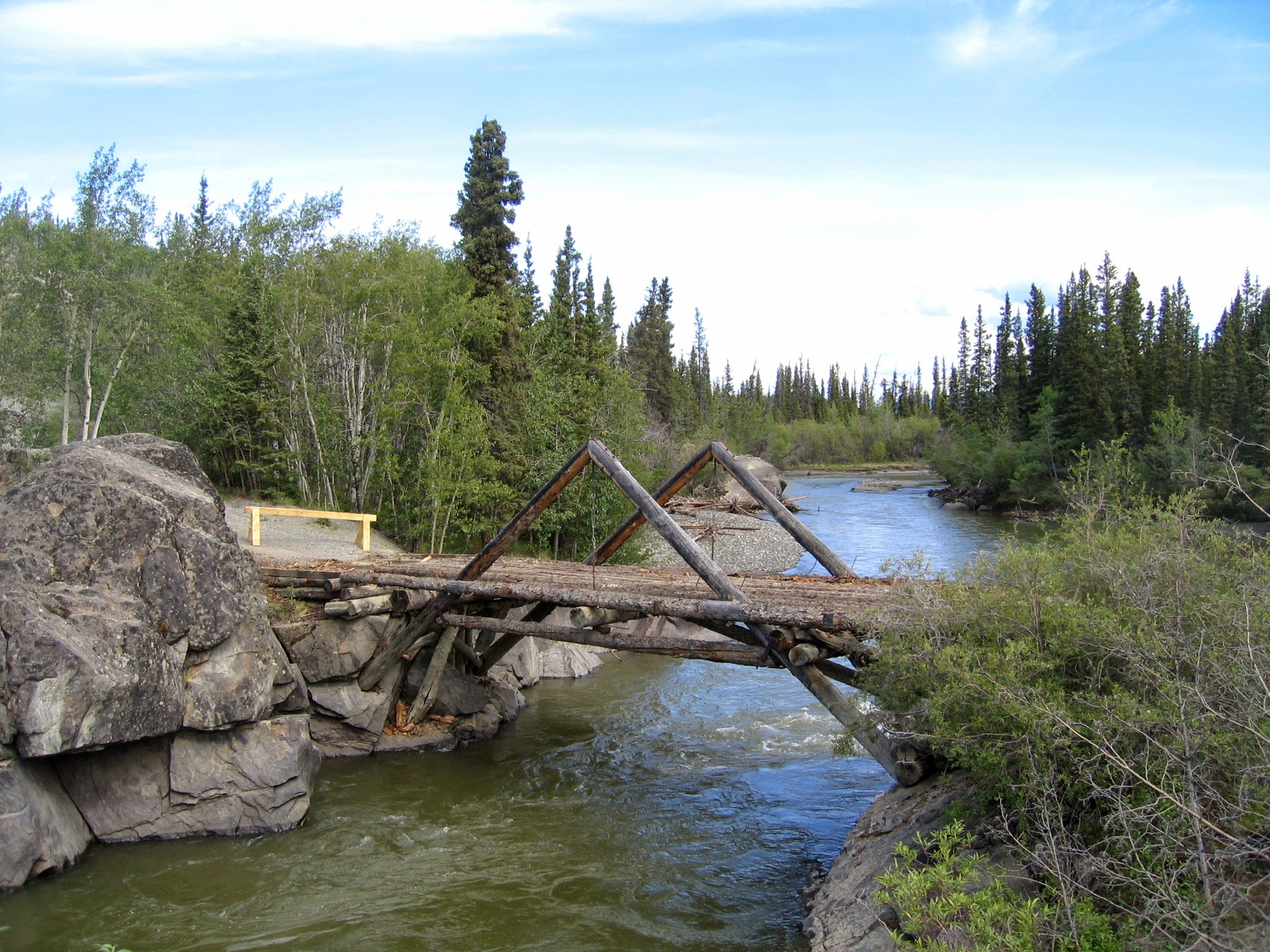
Aishihik River, immediately upstream from the Alaska Highway crossing

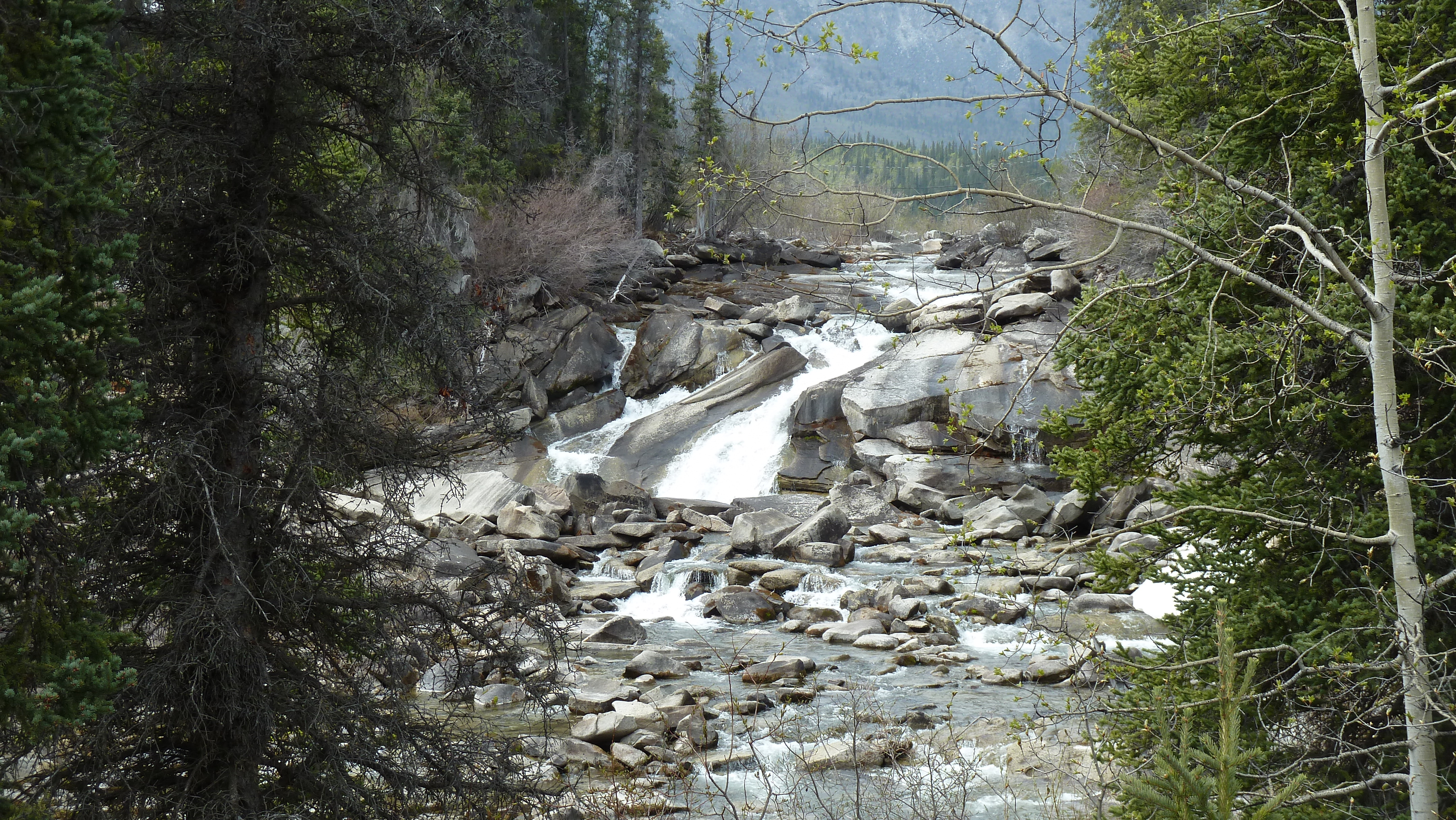
Otter Falls

The Aishihik River, also known as Canyon Creek, is a river in the Yukon Territory of Canada. Originating in Aishihik Lake, it flows south into the Dezadeash River, part of the Alsek River watershed.

Otter Falls, located on the Aishihik River, were pictured on the reverse of the 1954 series of Canadian $5 bills. Flows on the northern portion of the river, including Otter Falls, are considerably reduced because of a hydroelectric dam and station owned by the Yukon Energy Corporation. The Aishihik Road mainly follows the river.

The river crosses the Alaska Highway at small outpost called Canyon Creek, Yukon, where a replica of one of the original wooden bridges of the Alaska Highway still stands.

== See also ==
- List of rivers of British Columbia
- List of rivers of Yukon
