= Jack Wade, Alaska =

Unincorporated community in the state of Alaska, United States

Jack Wade
- Unincorporated community
- Location within the state of Alaska
- Coordinates: 64°9′15″N 141°27′35″W
- Country: United States
- State: Alaska
- Census area: Southeast Fairbanks

Government
  - State senator: Click Bishop (R)
  - State rep.: Dave Talerico (R)
- Elevation: 2,428 ft (740 m)
- Time zone: UTC-9 (Alaska (AKST))
  - Summer (DST): UTC-8 (AKDT)
- GNIS feature ID: 1404039

Jack Wade is an unincorporated community in Southeast Fairbanks Census Area, Alaska, United States. Its elevation is 2,428 feet (740 m), and it is located along Wade Creek at 64°9′15″N 141°27′35″W (64.1541667, -141.4597222), about 46 miles (74 km) south of Eagle near the Canada–US border. Founded as a mining camp around 1900, it was named for Jack Anderson and Wade Nelson, the original locators. Jack Wade received a post office in 1901, which remained until 1948.

== Demographics ==
Historical population
Census	Pop.	Note	%±
1930	13		—
1940	21		61.5%
U.S. Decennial Census

Jack Wade first appeared on the 1930 U.S. Census as an unincorporated village. It reported again in 1940, but ceased to appear afterwards.

== History ==
Because of questions as to whether claims were in Canada or Alaska, many miners filed claim locations in both Dawson City, Yukon Territory and Eagle, Alaska. Jack Wade Creek's first claims were located in 1892, and have been worked continuously ever since. The creek was named for Jack Anderson and Wade Nelson, the original locators. In 1936, the bucket line dredge working at Franklin was bought, dismantled and hauled by horses over the ice to Jack Wade Creek by the Yukon Placer Mining Co., which owned the claims. In 1938, Fred Whitehead had the contract to build the small airstrip at Jack Wade Creek, and the airstrip for Franklin, on the ridge between Franklin and Jack Wade. George Robinson went to work for "the Company" on Jack Wade in 1932, went to war in 1941 and returned to the creek in 1949. In 1951, George bought Jack Wade from the company, mining on his own, until the early 1970s when his health forced him to slow down. George died in 1989 at the age of 83. He lived in a log cabin built around the start of the 20th century and told stories of the old miners, good and bad season, of walking to Dawson for a few days of cards and girls, of the big nuggets; 25, 33, 56 & 70 ounces that the creek has given up. His lifestyle hadn't changed much since he first came to the creek 55 years ago. In 1986, Bureau of Land Management told George his claims were no longer valid, and the Sierra Club has a court order closing down 85% of the mining in Alaska at the end of the 1987 season, which not only ended George's income, but put an end to his lifestyle that had not changed in over 100 years. But George Robinson pleaded his case in court, and got his claims back.
