= Poker Creek–Little Gold Creek Border Crossing =

Border crossing between Yukon, Canada and Alaska, United States

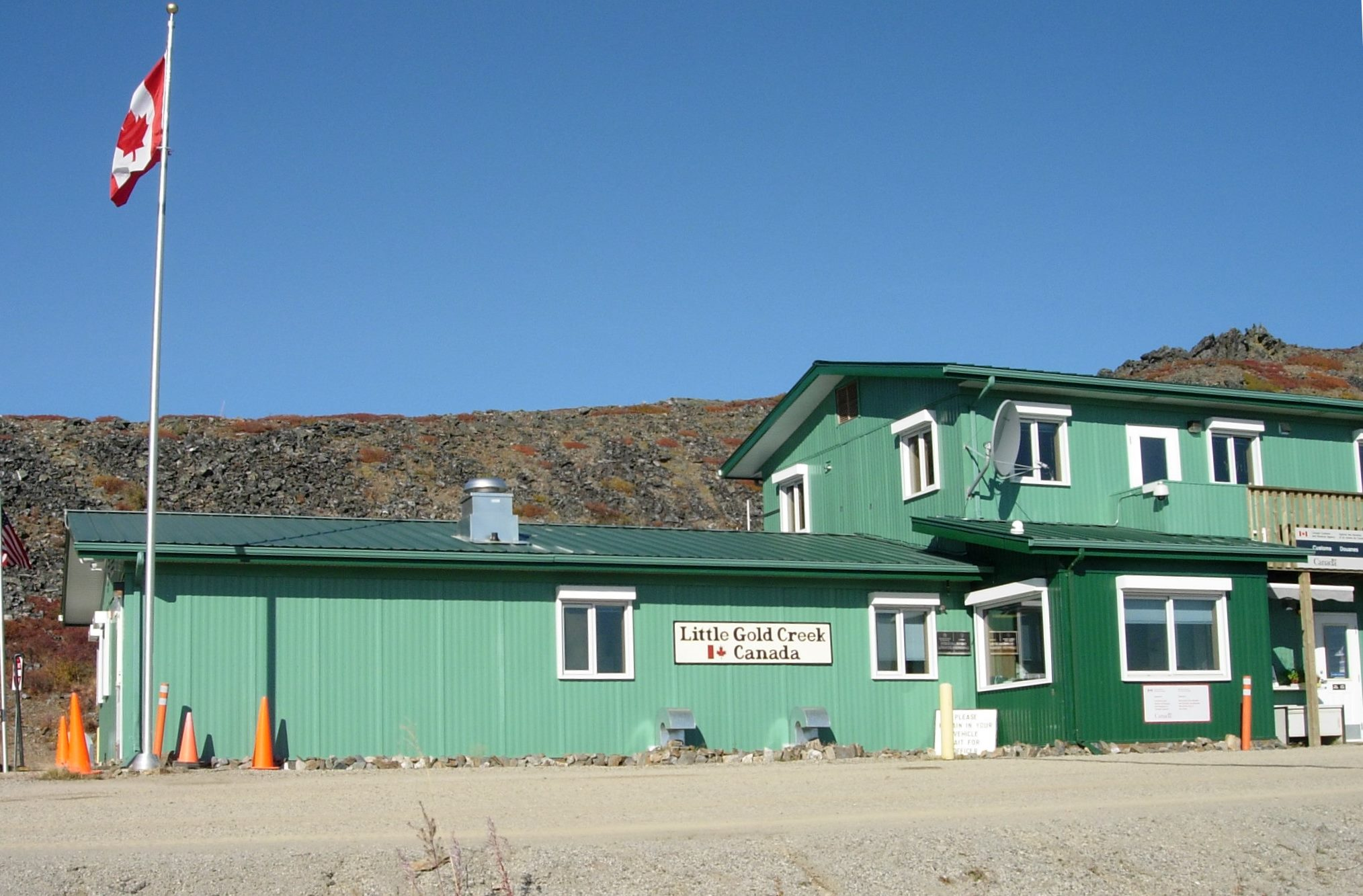
- The Canadian side of the joint border inspection station at the Poker Creek–Little Gold Creek Border Crossing

Location
- Country: United States, Canada
- Location: Hwy 9 / Top of the World Highway; US Port: Top of the World Highway, Poker Creek, AK 99780; Canadian Port: Top of the World Highway, Little Gold Creek, Yukon
- Coordinates: 64.0856°N 141.0013°W

Details
- Opened: 1971

Website
- http://www.cbp.gov/contact/ports/alcan

The Poker Creek–Little Gold Creek Border Crossing is located on the Top of the World Highway, which connects the communities of Dawson, Yukon, and Chicken, Alaska, on the Canada–United States border.

== History ==
The Top of the World Highway was completed around 1955, but the US performed border inspection services about 120 miles (190 km) away in Tok, Alaska until 1971, when it built a log cabin-style inspection station at the border. The crossing is open from April 15 to September 15 9am to 7pm, during the other times of the year the highway is closed due to weather conditions. Officers from both the US and Canada live at the port one week on, one week off during the summer months. In 2001, the US and Canada constructed a joint border inspection station, where inspectors from both countries occupy a single facility. A line painted on the floor in the building marks the US-Canada border.

This crossing is notable for being the northernmost international border crossing in North America.

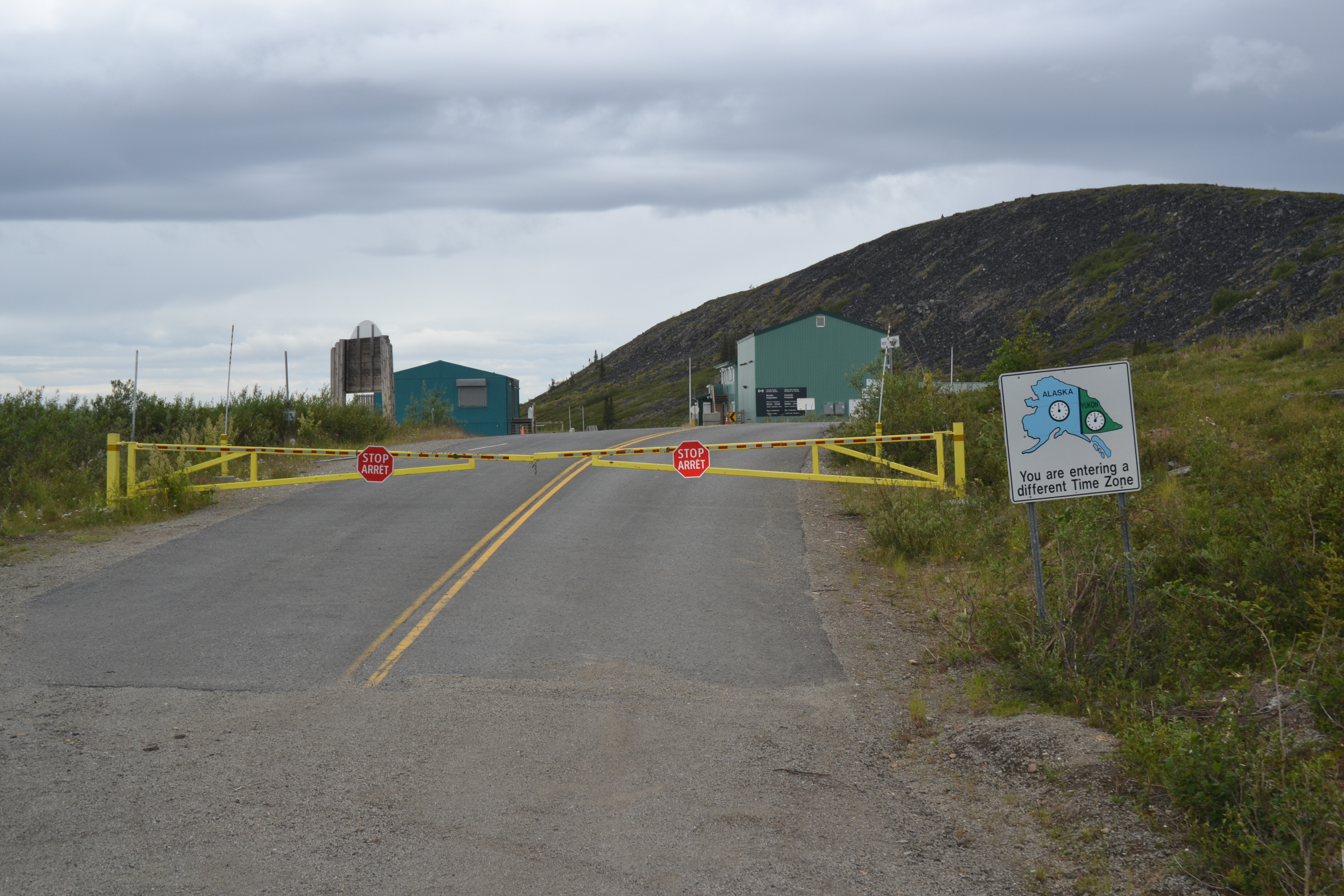
Poker Creek–Little Gold Creek Border Crossing from the Canadian side on the Top of the World Highway. The border would normally be open, but was closed due to the Covid-19 Pandemic.

== See also ==
- List of Canada–United States border crossings
