= Mactung mine =

Tungsten deposit in Northern Canada

- Location within Yukon
- Location: Yukon, Canada; 63°17′4.92″N 130°9′10.08″W
- Products: Tungsten
- Company: Government of the Northwest Territories

The Mactung Project is a planned underground tungsten mine located in the Selwyn Mountains of eastern Yukon, Canada, on its border with the Northwest Territories. Mactung represents one of the largest tungsten resources in Canada having estimated reserves of 33 million tonnes of ore grading 0.88% WO_{3}. The Mactung Project completed the Yukon Environmental and Socio-economic Assessment process in July 2014, and the Yukon government approved construction of the mine (pending mining and water licence applications, and subject to a number of conditions) in September 2014. North American Tungsten Corporation estimated the capital cost of the mine's construction to be approximately CA$400 million. In November 2015, the Government of the Northwest Territories purchased the mineral deposit. Fireweed Metals signed a letter of intent to buy the project in 2022 and acquired the project in 2023.
