= Watson Lake, Yukon =

Watson Lake
- Town
- Town of Watson Lake
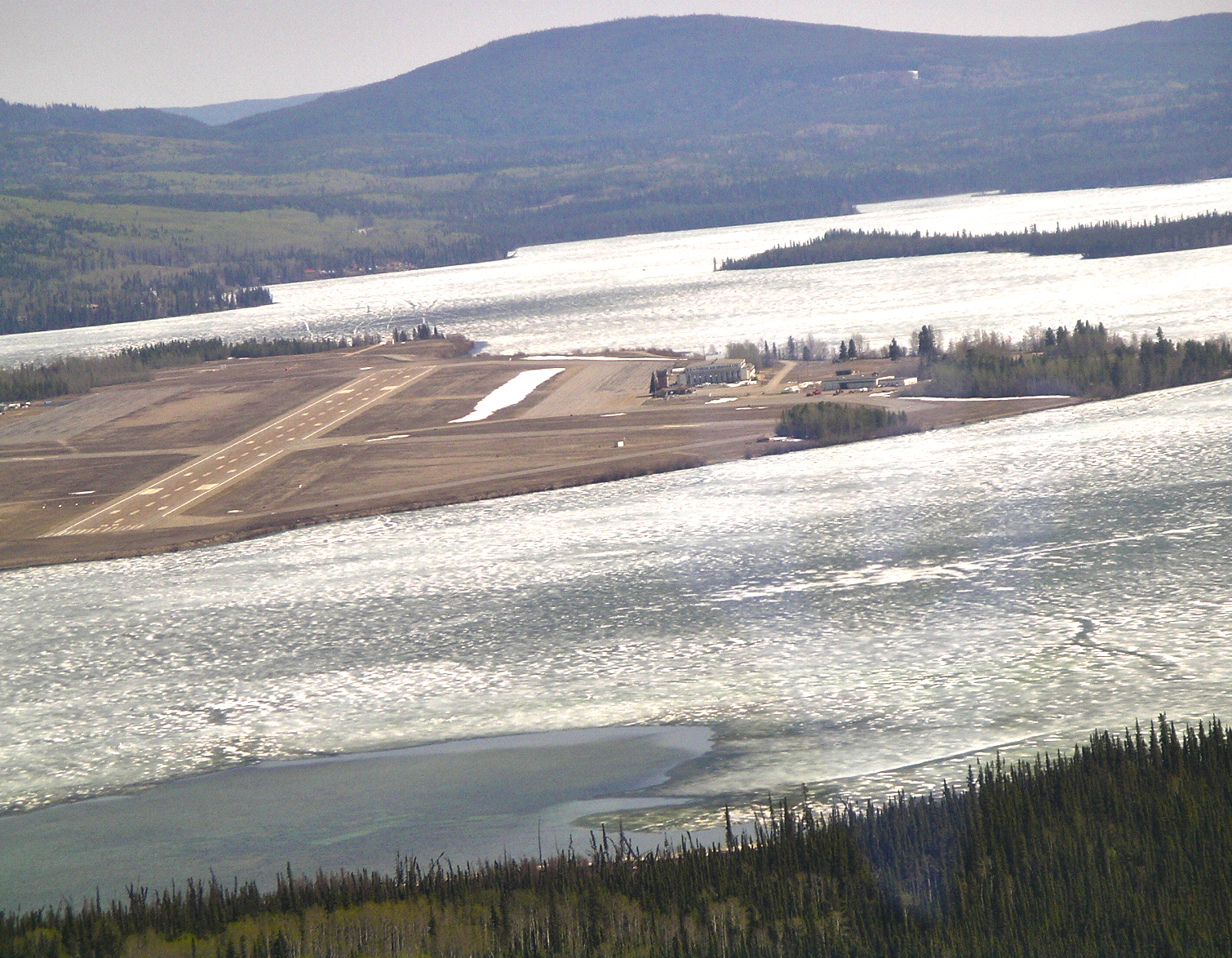

- Location of Watson Lake in Yukon Watson Lake (Canada)
- Coordinates: 60°03′45″N 128°42′25″W
- Country: Canada
- Territory: Yukon

Government
  - Town Mayor: Lauren Hanchar
  - MPs: Brendan Hanley
  - MLAs: Patti McLeod

Area (2021)
  - Land: 109.77 km^{2} (42.38 sq mi)

Population (2021)
  - Total: 1,133
  - Density: 10.3/km^{2} (27/sq mi)
- Time zone: UTC−07:00 (MST)
- Forward sortation area: Y0A 1C0 & Y0A 0A2
- Area code: 867
- Website: www.watsonlake.ca

Watson Lake is a town in Yukon, Canada, located at mile 635 on the Alaska Highway close to the British Columbia border. It had a population of 1,133 in 2021. The town is named for Frank Watson, an American-born trapper and prospector, who settled in the area at the end of the 19th century.

Watson Lake is near the Liard River, at the junction of the Robert Campbell Highway and the Alaska Highway. The Stewart–Cassiar Highway's northern end is 22 km (14 mi) west of Watson Lake. The town is also served by the Watson Lake Airport; the airport was formerly served by Canadian Pacific Air Lines and other local and regional airlines, but now by Air North and corporate and charter services.

Watson Lake is the main centre of the small forestry industry in Yukon and has been a service centre for the mining industry, especially for the Cassiar, a now abandoned asbestos mine in northern British Columbia and the Cantung Mine, a tungsten mine on the Yukon-Northwest Territories border in the Mackenzie Mountains.

Tourist attractions in Watson Lake include the Northern Lights Centre and the much-imitated original Sign Post Forest. The Sign Post Forest was started in 1942 by a homesick United States Army Corps of Engineers G.I. working on the Alaska Highway, who put up a sign with the name of his home town and the distance. Others followed suit and the tradition continues to this day. As of August 2010 there are more than 76,000 signs of various types depicting locations across the world. The Sign Post Forest is one of four roadside attractions featured on the first series of the Canadian Roadside Attractions Series issued by Canada Post on July 6, 2009.

Watson Lake and the neighbouring Upper Liard settlement are the home of the Liard River First Nation, a member of the Kaska Dena Council. The Two Mile area immediately north of the core of town is a concentrated area of First Nations residents, while the town extends 8.0 km (5 mi) out to the turn-off of Airport Road. (Originally, Airport Road extended directly to the Alaska Highway, but most of it is now part of the Campbell highway.)

== History ==
The Town of Watson Lake annexed Two Mile and Two and One-Half Mile Village on January 2, 2016.

== Geography ==
=== Climate ===
Like most of Yukon, Watson Lake has a subarctic climate (Dfc) with mild to warm summers and severely cold, snowy winters. Watson Lake experiences annual temperature average daily highs of 21.3 °C (70.3 °F) in July and average daily lows of −26.7 °C (−16.1 °F) in January. Record high temperature was 35.4 °C (95.7 °F) in July 2009 and the lowest was −58.9 °C (−74.0 °F) in January 1947. Watson Lake has more precipitation than other parts of Yukon with an average annual snowfall of 197.0 cm (77.56 in) and 260.9 mm (10.27 in) of rainfall, resulting in larger trees and a more viable forest industry.

Climate data for Watson Lake (Watson Lake Airport) WMO ID: 71953; coordinates 60°06′59″N 128°49′20″W; elevation: 687.4 m (2,255 ft); 1991–2020 normals, extremes 1938–present (Note: Composite data from: Watson Lake A; Climate ID: 2101201; coordinates 60°06′59″N 128°49′21″W; elevation: 687.3 m (2,255 ft): Watson Lake (AUT); WMO ID: 71199; coordinates 60°06′57″N 128°49′55″W; elevation: 683.3 m (2,242 ft))
Month	Jan	Feb	Mar	Apr	May	Jun	Jul	Aug	Sep	Oct	Nov	Dec	Year
Record high humidex	7.8	11.1	16.0	20.0	34.2	33.3	41.6	36.8	26.8	17.6	11.7	7.9	41.6
Record high °C (°F)	8.9 (48.0)	12.2 (54.0)	16.6 (61.9)	20.1 (68.2)	34.2 (93.6)	33.9 (93.0)	35.4 (95.7)	32.8 (91.0)	28.9 (84.0)	21.7 (71.1)	12.2 (54.0)	8.4 (47.1)	35.4 (95.7)
Mean daily maximum °C (°F)	−16.7 (1.9)	−9.8 (14.4)	−2.2 (28.0)	7.0 (44.6)	14.7 (58.5)	19.7 (67.5)	21.3 (70.3)	19.1 (66.4)	13.0 (55.4)	3.6 (38.5)	−9.3 (15.3)	−15.6 (3.9)	3.7 (38.7)
Daily mean °C (°F)	−21.7 (−7.1)	−16.5 (2.3)	−10.2 (13.6)	0.2 (32.4)	8.3 (46.9)	13.6 (56.5)	15.3 (59.5)	13.2 (55.8)	7.7 (45.9)	−0.4 (31.3)	−13.9 (7.0)	−20.4 (−4.7)	−2.1 (28.2)
Mean daily minimum °C (°F)	−26.7 (−16.1)	−23.2 (−9.8)	−18.1 (−0.6)	−6.6 (20.1)	1.8 (35.2)	7.4 (45.3)	9.3 (48.7)	7.2 (45.0)	2.5 (36.5)	−4.5 (23.9)	−18.5 (−1.3)	−25.1 (−13.2)	−7.9 (17.8)
Record low °C (°F)	−58.9 (−74.0)	−56.2 (−69.2)	−46.7 (−52.1)	−32.8 (−27.0)	−16.0 (3.2)	−3.3 (26.1)	0.6 (33.1)	−6.7 (19.9)	−13.9 (7.0)	−36.6 (−33.9)	−47.5 (−53.5)	−53.3 (−63.9)	−58.9 (−74.0)
Record low wind chill	−66.4	−63.3	−51.4	−36.2	−16.4	−5.2	0.0	−5.4	−19.0	−42.7	−55.5	−63.6	−66.4
Average precipitation mm (inches)	33.4 (1.31)	18.0 (0.71)	15.4 (0.61)	14.7 (0.58)	28.6 (1.13)	56.1 (2.21)	58.1 (2.29)	50.4 (1.98)	45.7 (1.80)	35.4 (1.39)	30.7 (1.21)	30.6 (1.20)	417.1 (16.42)
Average rainfall mm (inches)	0.3 (0.01)	0.0 (0.0)	0.2 (0.01)	5.3 (0.21)	25.8 (1.02)	57.5 (2.26)	58 (2.3)	50.5 (1.99)	43.3 (1.70)	18.8 (0.74)	0.6 (0.02)	0.6 (0.02)	260.9 (10.27)
Average snowfall cm (inches)	41 (16)	24.4 (9.6)	17.8 (7.0)	12.0 (4.7)	3.5 (1.4)	0.0 (0.0)	0.0 (0.0)	0.2 (0.1)	1.4 (0.6)	20.6 (8.1)	36.1 (14.2)	40.2 (15.8)	197 (78)
Average precipitation days (≥ 0.2 mm)	13.9	10.2	10.2	6.2	10.4	12.8	14.6	13.9	14.8	13.4	15.7	14.4	150.4
Average rainy days (≥ 0.2 mm)	0.26	0.14	0.26	2.2	10.1	12.9	14.4	13.4	13.9	6.7	0.54	0.41	75.2
Average snowy days (≥ 0.2 cm)	14.1	9.9	9.2	4.5	1.4	0.0	0.0	0.17	0.92	7.5	15.3	14.5	77.4
Average relative humidity (%) (at 1500 LST)	76.3	74.8	60.3	46.7	40.1	44.1	48.1	49.9	56.0	69.1	80.5	78.2	60.3
Source: Environment and Climate Change Canada

== Demographics ==
Federal census population history of Watson Lake
Year	Pop.	±%
1941	58	—
1951	238	+310.3%
1971	553	+132.4%
1976	808	+46.1%
1981	748	−7.4%
1986	826	+10.4%
1991	912	+10.4%
1996	993	+8.9%
2001	912	−8.2%
2006	846	−7.2%
2011	802	−5.2%
2016	790	−1.5%
2016 (rev.)	1,083	+37.1%
2021	1,133	+4.6%
Source: Statistics Canada

In the 2021 Canadian census conducted by Statistics Canada, Watson Lake had a population of 1,133 living in 499 of its 564 total private dwellings, a change of 4.6% from its 2016 population of 1,083. With a land area of 109.77 km^{2} (42.38 sq mi), it had a population density of 10.3/km^{2} (26.7/sq mi) in 2021.

Panethnic groups in the Town of Watson Lake (2001−2021)
Panethnic group	2021		2016		2011		2006		2001	
Panethnic group	Pop.	%	Pop.	%	Pop.	%	Pop.	%	Pop.	%
European (Note: Statistic includes all persons that did not make up part of a visible minority or an indigenous identity.)	600	53.33%	435	55.06%	565	70.63%	515	60.95%	630	69.23%
Indigenous	455	40.44%	305	38.61%	205	25.63%	305	36.09%	265	29.12%
Southeast Asian (Note: Statistic includes total responses of "Filipino" and "Southeast Asian" under visible minority section on census.)	40	3.56%	30	3.8%	0	0%	20	2.37%	0	0%
East Asian (Note: Statistic includes total responses of "Chinese", "Korean", and "Japanese" under visible minority section on census.)	15	1.33%	10	1.27%	10	1.25%	10	1.18%	0	0%
South Asian	10	0.89%	10	1.27%	0	0%	15	1.78%	0	0%
Latin American	0	0%	10	1.27%	10	1.25%	0	0%	0	0%
African	0	0%	10	1.27%	0	0%	0	0%	10	1.1%
Middle Eastern (Note: Statistic includes total responses of "West Asian" and "Arab" under visible minority section on census.)	0	0%	0	0%	0	0%	0	0%	0	0%
Other/multiracial (Note: Statistic includes total responses of "Visible minority, n.i.e." and "Multiple visible minorities" under visible minority section on census.)	20	1.78%	0	0%	10	1.25%	0	0%	0	0%
Total responses	1,125	99.29%	790	72.95%	800	99.75%	845	99.88%	910	99.78%
Total population	1,133	100%	1,083	100%	802	100%	846	100%	912	100%
Note: Totals greater than 100% due to multiple origin responses

== Gallery ==
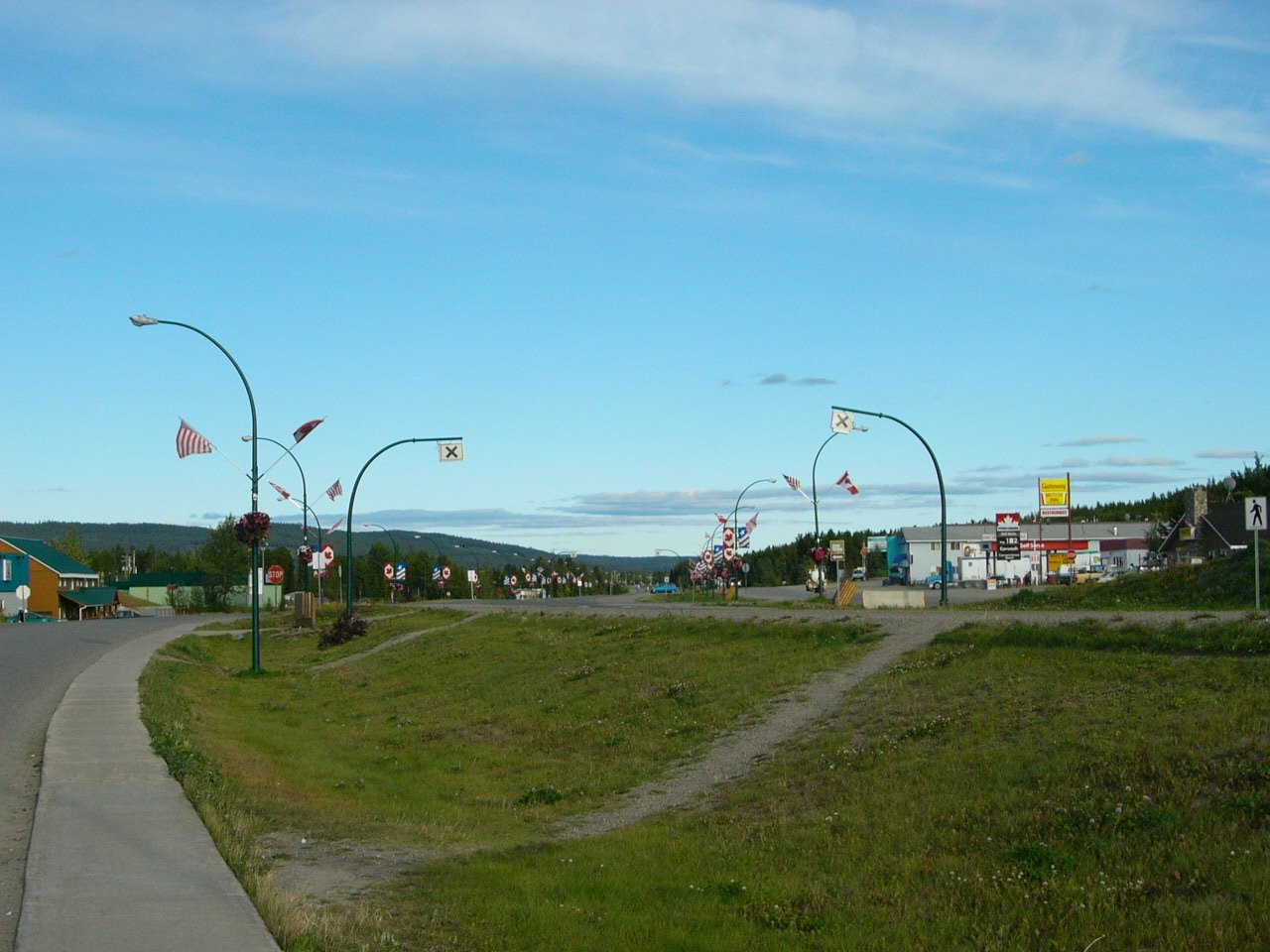
Alaska Highway through Watson Lake

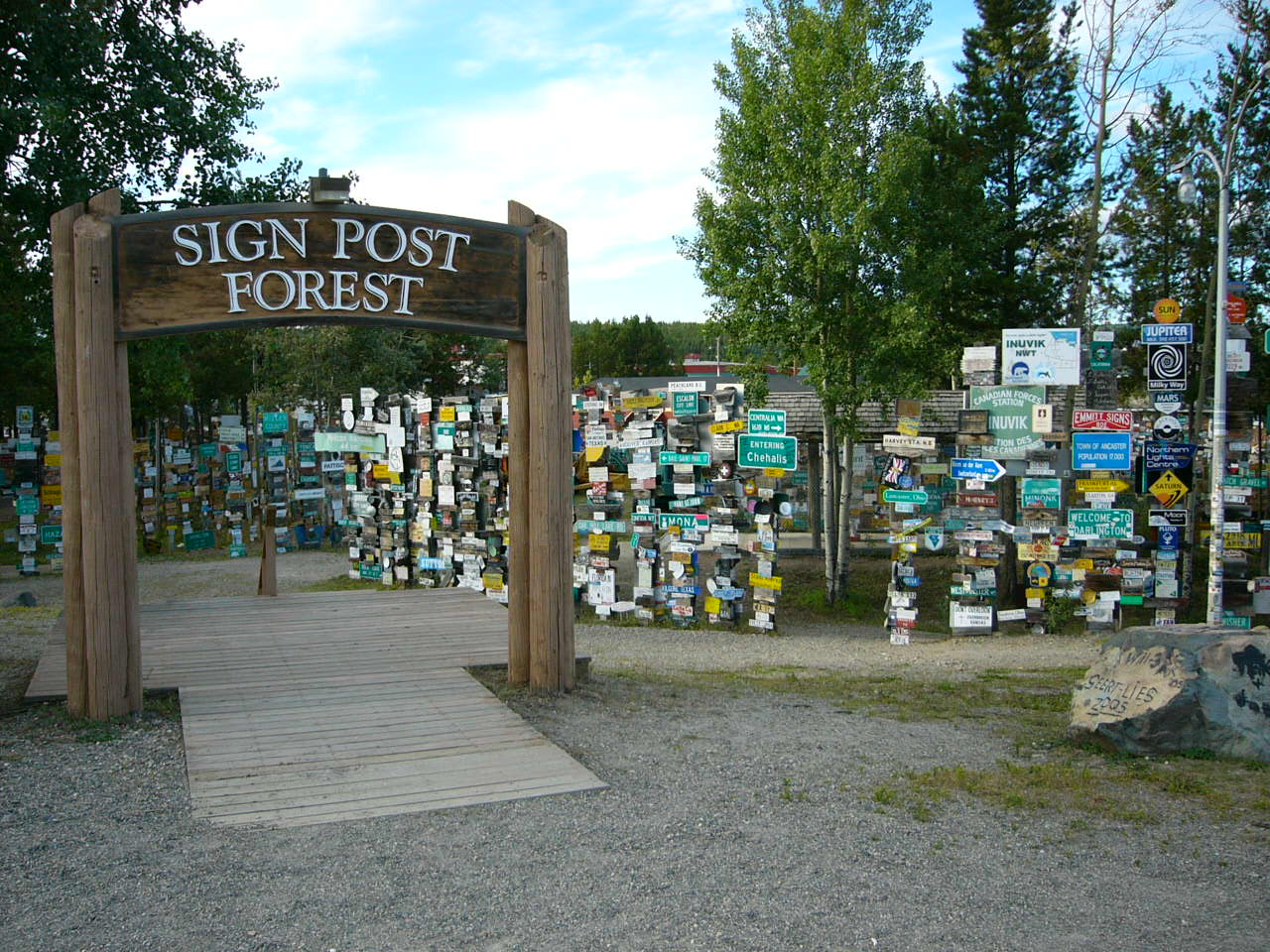
Signpost forest at Watson Lake

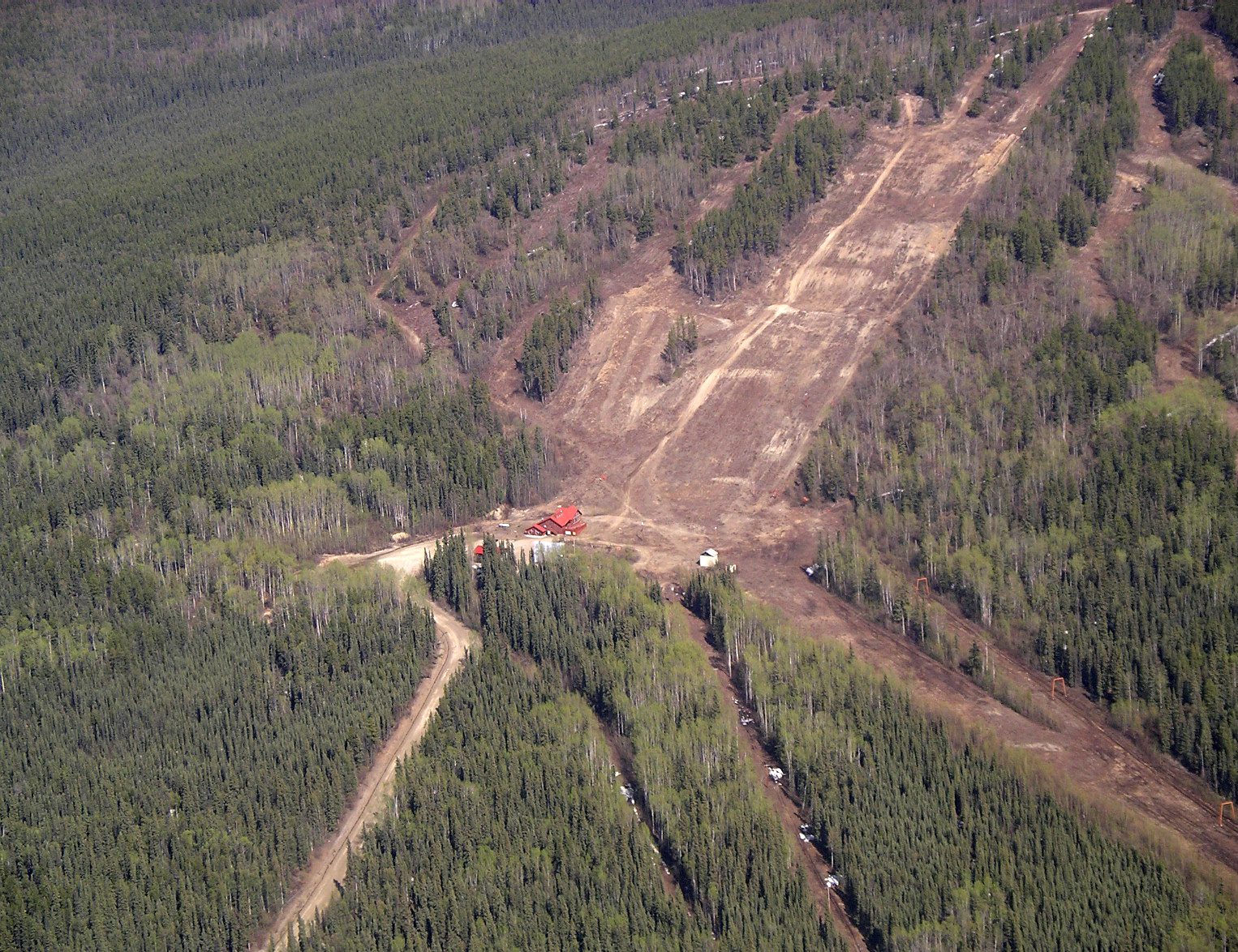
Ski Hill at Watson Lake

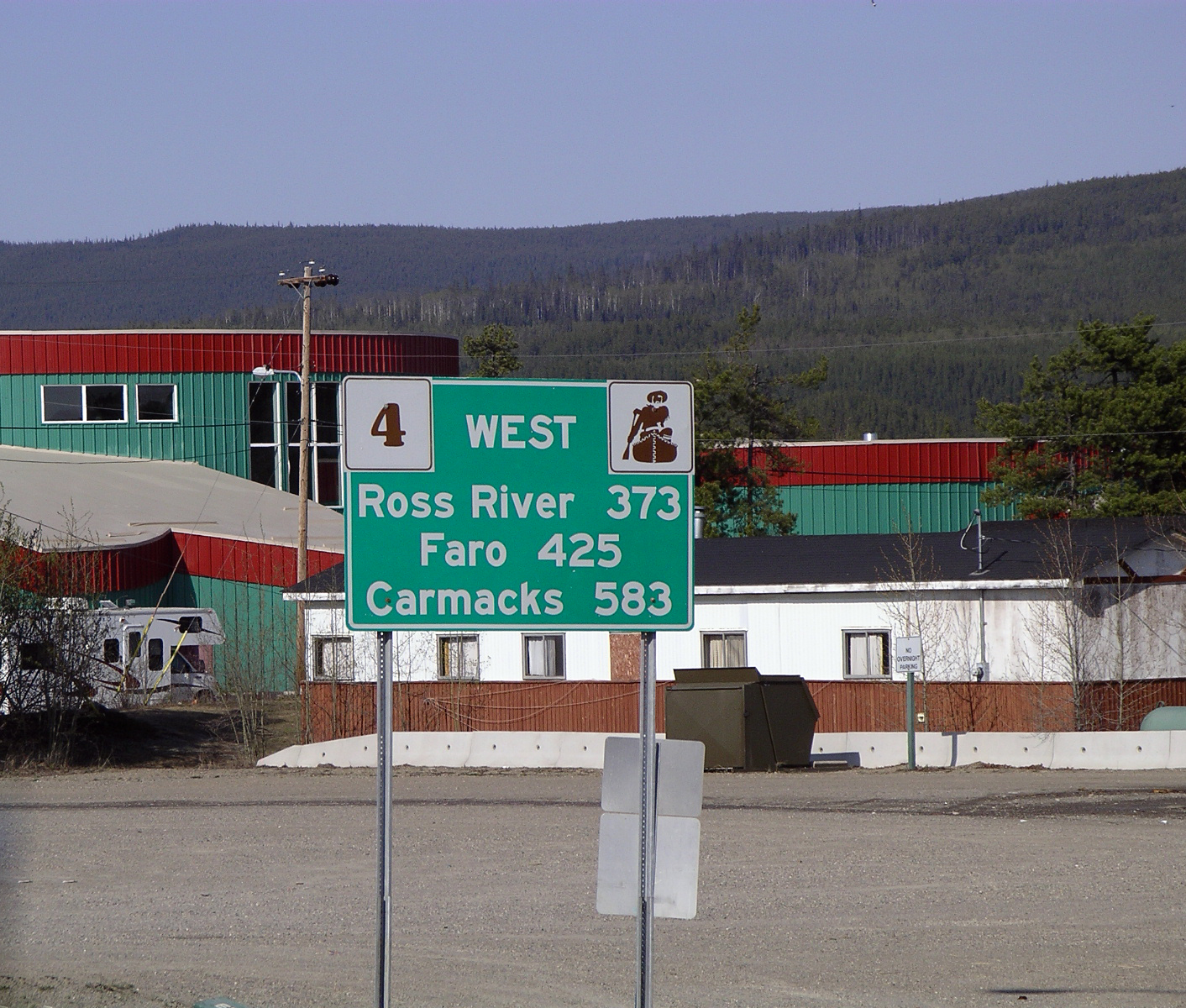
Carmacks 583 kilometres

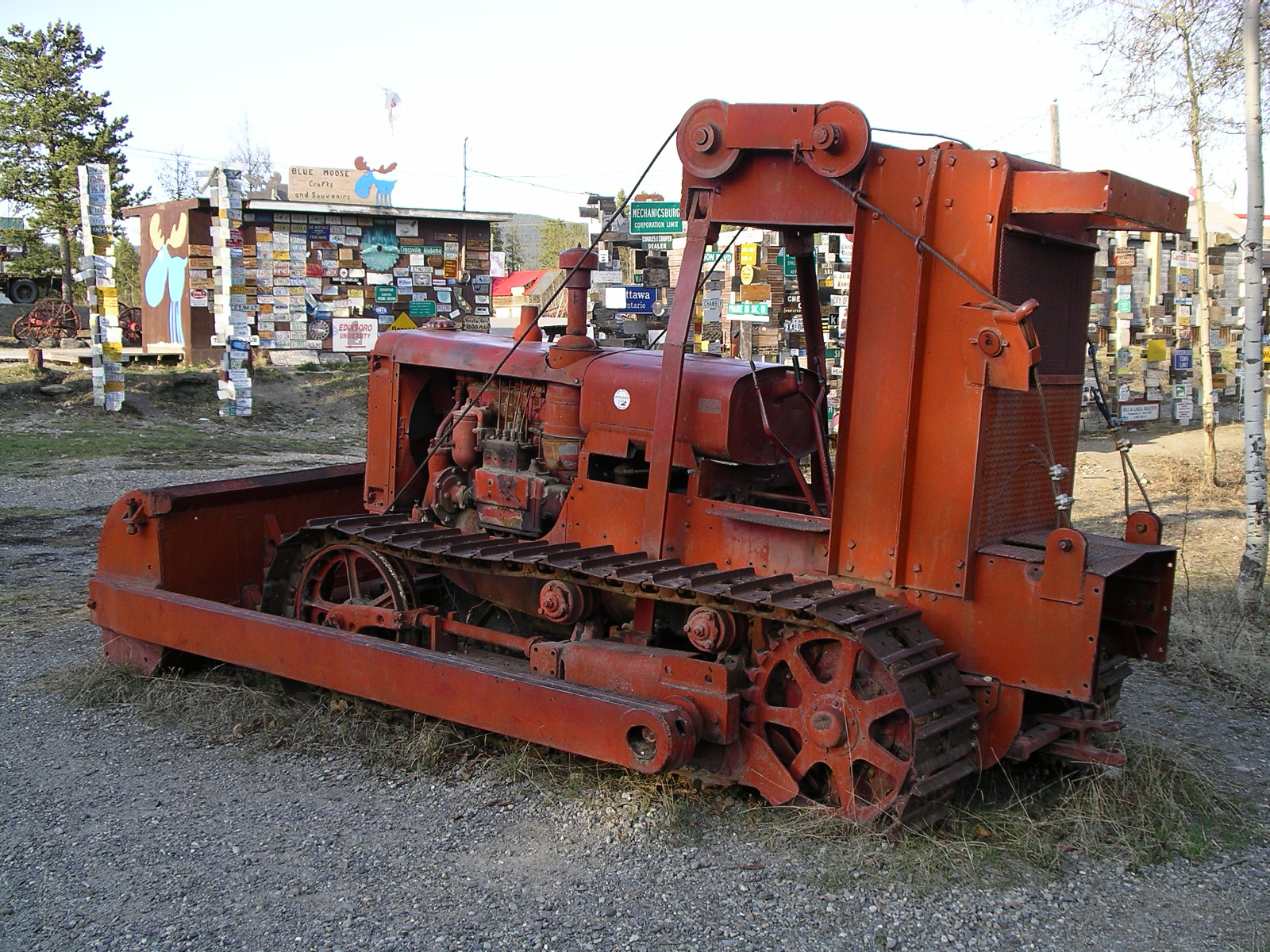
Abandoned bulldozer

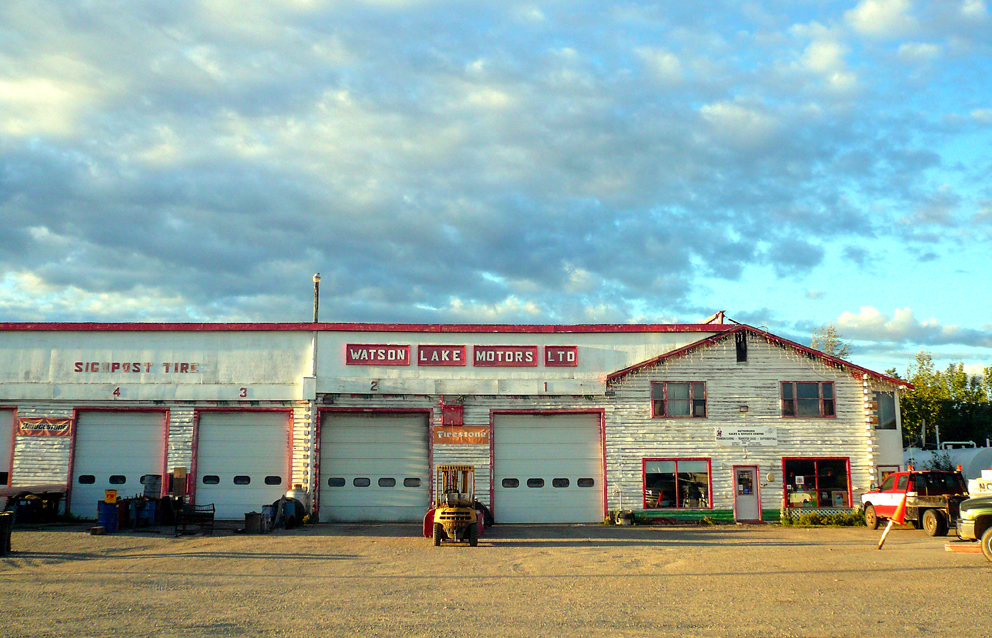
Watson Lake Motors

== See also ==
- Coal River Springs Territorial Park
- List of municipalities in Yukon
