= Aishihik Lake =

Lake in Yukon, Canada

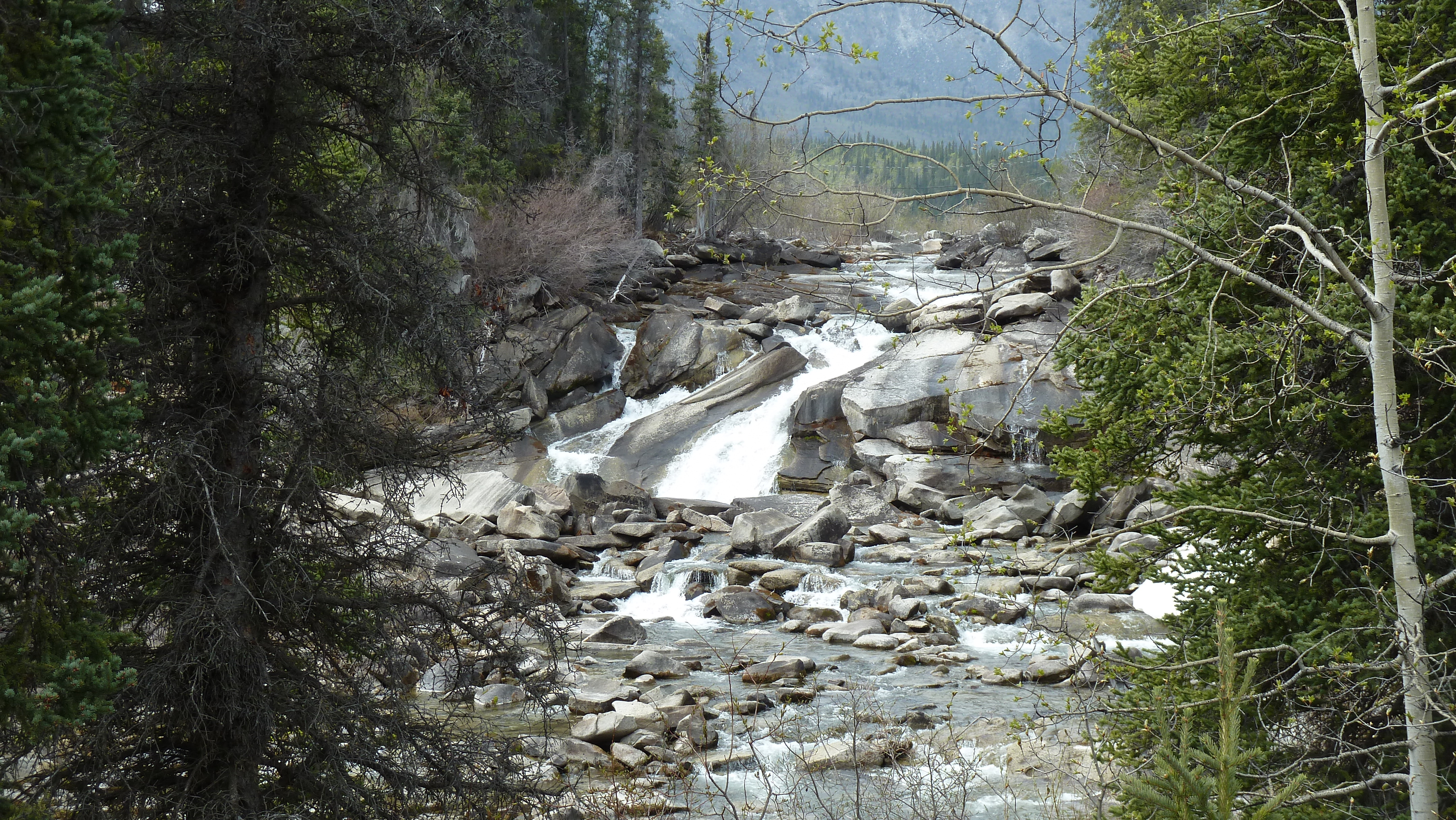
- Otter Falls on Aishihik Lake Road

- Location within Canada
- Location: Yukon
- Coordinates: 61°27′N 137°8′W
- Catchment area: 2,765 km^{2} (1,068 sq mi)
- Basin countries: Canada
- Surface area: 146 km^{2} (56 sq mi)
- Average depth: 30 m (98 ft)
- Max. depth: 120 m (390 ft)
- Water volume: 4.38 km^{3} (1.05 cu mi)
- Residence time: 14.6 years
- Shore length^{1}: 153 km (95 mi)
- Surface elevation: 914 m (2,999 ft)
- ^{1} Shore length is not a well-defined measure.

Aishihik Lake is a lake in southwestern Yukon, Canada. Yukon Electric Corporation operates a 37 megawatt hydroelectric dam, built in 1975, at the south end of the lake, where it drains southward into the Aishihik River.

A US Air Force base was established near the north part of the lake during World War II. The base used two Buda diesel engines to supply power and pump water.

== Fauna ==
=== Northern Mountain caribou ===
The Aishihik and Kluane caribou herds migrate in the area surrounding Kluane and Aishihik Lakes. They are a northern mountain caribou, a distinct ecotype of the woodland caribou. In 2009 there were 181 caribou in the Kluane herd (also known as the Burwash herd) and 2,044 caribou in the Aishihik herd. The Kluane herd was declining while the Aishihik herd was increasing.

=== Wood Bison ===
A 2020 Government of Yukon report stated that an estimated 50% of the territory's wood bison population lived in a core range centered on this lake and stretching east the Klondike Highway, south to the Alaska Highway, west to Kluane Lake.

== See also ==
- List of lakes in Yukon
