= List of Yukon roads =

In addition to numbered highways, Yukon has several other roads that are maintained by the territorial government.

- Aishihik Road (pronounced aysh-ee-ack) is an 84-mile road from the Alaska Highway at Canyon Creek (historic mile 996) to the former airfield of Aishihik at the north end of Aishihik Lake. The airfield was part of the Northwest Staging Route, but was effectively abandoned in 1968. Since then, the Yukon government only maintains the first 27 miles of road, which serves two campgrounds and the Aishihik Lake hydroelectric station. The Champagne-Aishihik First Nation (CAFN) has an aboriginal interest in Aishihik and uses the location for traditional gatherings; it has used the site to host a gathering of the Council of Yukon First Nations when the rotation among member first nations took the gathering to the CAFN.
- Annie Lake Road is an 18-mile road in Mount Lorne hamlet that services residential areas, plus a golf course. During the 1980s, the Skukum Gold Mine made use of the road to connect across the Wheaton River to its gold mining operations.
- Snag Road is a primitive but driveable road that starts from the Alaska Highway south of Beaver Creek, leading approximately 15 miles to the former location of Snag, Yukon. Until 1968, Snag was a military airfield, established as part of the Northwest Staging Route, and the weather station here recorded, on February 3, 1947, the coldest official temperature in North America: 81 degrees below zero, Fahrenheit (-62.8 degrees Celsius). The personnel at the station could also hear conversations at the First Nations (Indian) village just about three miles away. Until the 1970s, the Canadian customs station for Beaver Creek was still called Snag, at a time when the customs station was in the middle of Beaver Creek. Some travelers who missed the customs station, and who the police did not catch up to, traveled up the Snag Road looking for the customs station.
- Ross River Access Road connects Ross River with the Robert Campbell Highway, an approximate nine-mile road that replaces a poorer six-mile section of the Canol Road.
- Kusawa Lake Road, starting at historical mile 960 of the Alaska Highway, provides access to campgrounds on Kusawa Lake as well as a small number of area residents.
- Old Alaska Highway at Champagne served as part of the main highway until fall 2002. It remains open to provide access to Champagne and a traditional campsite.
- Bonanza Creek Road and Hunker Creek Road in the historic Klondike mining district provide access to privately operated mines and some private homes in the Hunker Creek area. These roads are built to minimal standards, and the course of the Bonanza Creek road has been shifted in recent years to accommodate mining operations.

== See also ==
- List of Yukon territorial highways
