= List of steamboats on the Yukon River =

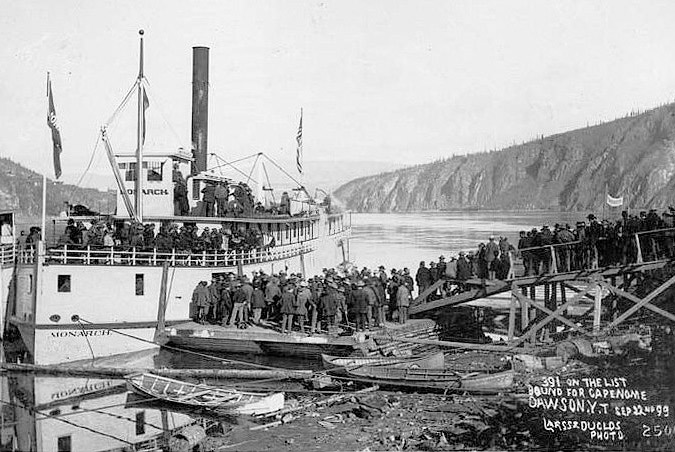
Klondikers headed down the Yukon for the Nome Gold Rush, Sept. 22, 1899

This is a list of steamboats on the Yukon River. Please see Steamboats of the Yukon River for historical context.

== White Pass & Yukon Route vessels ==
White Pass Steam Power – Stern Wheel Boats (83 vessels)
Name	Registry (-ies)	Year built	Where Built	Builder	Volume (gross tons)	Hull Length	Remarks
Aksala (Alaska, 1913–1927)	U.S.A. #165171 (1913–1927); Canada #116621 (1927–1964)	1913	Seattle, Washington (hull); Whitehorse, Yukon (superstructure)	Nilson & Kelez Shipbuilding Corp. (hull); WP&YR (superstructure)	1067 (785, 1913–1927)	167 feet (50.9 m)	Last used in 1951. Broken up at Whitehorse in 1964. Aksala is Alaska spelled backwards.: Alaska was derived from the Aleut idiom alaxsx-a, which figuratively refers to mainland Alaska. Literally, it means object to which the action of the sea is directed.
Alaska	......	......	......	......	......	......	See, Aksala.
Alice (of Kuskokwim)	U.S.A. #107253	1895	St. Michael, Alaska	Alaska Commercial Co.	400	160 feet (48.8 m)	Originally owned by Alaska Commercial Co. Transferred to Northern Navigation Co. in 1901. Acquired by WP&YR in 1914. Not used under WP&YR ownership. Abandoned at St. Marys, Alaska in 1917.: Named for Alice Levison (1873–1973), daughter of AC Co. president Lewis Gerstle.
Alice (of Susitna)	U.S.A. #260095	1909	Seattle, Washington	Cook & Lake Shipyards	262	111 feet (33.8 m)	Originally owned by Alaska Commercial Co. Sold to Northern Navigation Co. in 1911. Acquired by WP&YR in 1914. Last used by WP&YR in 1917. Sold to The Alaska R.R. in 1926. Retired and resold to the Catholic Church (Holy Cross Mission) in 1953.
Anglian	Canada #107512	1898	Teslin, Yukon	Teslin & Yukon Transportation Co.	162	85 feet (25.9 m)	Originally owned by the Canadian Development Co. The T&YT had intended to build the boat for its own use, but the CD Co. bought out the T&YT in February 1898, before the boat was built. Boat acquired by WP&YR in 1901. Last used by WP&YR in 1901. Broken up at Whitehorse, Yukon in 1931.: Named for Henry Maitland Kersey (1859–1941), managing director of the CD Co. Kersey was from Suffolk, in East Anglia, England.
Arnold	U.S.A. #107353	1898	Dutch Harbor, Alaska	Thomas P. H. Whitelaw	692	181 feet (55.2 m)	Originally owned by Alaska Exploration Co. Transferred to Northern Navigation Co. in 1901. Acquired by WP&YR in 1914. Not used under WP&YR ownership. Abandoned across the bay from St. Michael, Alaska in 1917.: Named for Arnold L. Liebes (1889–1957), son of AE Co. president Isaac Liebes.
Australian	Canada #107525	1899	Bennett, British Columbia	Canadian Development Co.	422	115 feet (35.1 m)	Originally owned by CD Co. Acquired by WP&YR in 1901. Last used by WP&YR in 1904. Sold to U.S. Public Roads Administration and converted to Barge #1450 in 1942. Transferred back to WP&YR in 1943. Scuttled at Carcross, just east of the railroad bridge, about 1970.: Most likely, named for the Victoria, Australia gold rush of 1851.
Bella	U.S.A. #3759	1896	St. Michael, Alaska	Matthew Turner	370	140 feet (42.7 m)	Originally owned by Alaska Commercial Co. Transferred to Northern Navigation Co. in 1901. Acquired by WP&YR in 1914. Not used under WP&YR ownership. Abandoned at St. Michael in 1917.: Named for Hannah Isabelle "Bella" Lilienthal (1856–1923), daughter of AC Co. general manager Louis Sloss.
Bonanza King (Gov. Pingree, 1898–1900)	U.S.A. #86414 (1898–1900); Canada #107851 (1900–1955)	1898	Seattle, Washington	Puget Sound Bridge & Dredging Co. (hull #1)	466	140 feet (42.7 m)	Originally owned by Boston & Alaska Transportation Co. Sold to the Yukon Flyer Line in 1900. Resold to P. Burns & Co. Acquired by WP&YR in 1901. Last used as a boat by WP&YR in 1910. Converted to lumber storeroom at Whitehorse, Yukon in 1917. Broken up in 1957.: Named for Nels Peterson (1850–1939), successful Bonanza Creek miner and owner of the Yukon Flyer Line.; Originally named for Hazen S. Pingree (1840-1901), governor of Michigan, 1897-1901.
Canadian	Canada #107094	1898	Victoria, British Columbia	John H. Todd	716	147 feet (44.8 m)	Originally owned by Canadian Development Co. Acquired by WP&YR in 1901. Last used in 1927. Placed as riprap in Yukon River at Whitehorse, Yukon in 1931. Machinery recovered from river in 1997.: Most likely, named for the British Columbia, Canada gold rushes of 1850 and 1861.
1st Casca	Canada #103919	1898	Victoria, British Columbia	Esquimalt Marine Railway Co. (hull #1)	590	140 feet (42.7 m)	Originally owned by Casca Trading & Transportation Co. Sold to Otto R. Bremmer in 1899 or 1900. Resold to Ironside, Rennie & Campbell Co. in 1903. Acquired by WP&YR in 1904. Last used in 1909. Broken up at Lower Laberge, Yukon in 1911.: Kaska may have originated as a Tahltan term, which means old moccasins, and which was a scornful name for the Kaska tribe.
2nd Casca	Canada #103919	1911	Whitehorse, Yukon	WP&YR	1079	161 feet (49.1 m)	Foundered at Rink Rapids, Yukon in 1936.: Kaska may have originated as a Tahltan term, which means old moccasins, and which was a scornful name for the Kaska tribe.
3rd Casca	Canada #170613	1937	Whitehorse, Yukon	WP&YR	1300	180 feet (54.9 m)	Last used in 1951. Transferred to Canadian Government in 1960. Demolished by fire (arson) at Whitehorse in 1974.: Kaska may have originated as a Tahltan term, which means old moccasins, and which was a scornful name for the Kaska tribe.
Chas. H. Hamilton	U.S.A. #127290	1897	St. Michael, Alaska	Moran Bros. (hull #3)	595	190 feet (57.9 m)	Originally owned by North American Transportation & Trading Co. Transferred to the Merchants' Yukon Transportation Co. in 1910. Sold to Northern Navigation Co. in 1911. Acquired by WP&YR in 1914. Not used under WP&YR ownership. Sold by WP&YR and abandoned by new owner at St. Michael Canal, Alaska in 1927.: Named for Charles H. Hamilton (1872–1929), manager of the NAT&T Co.
Clifford Sifton	Canada #107528	1898	Bennett, British Columbia	Dominion Steamboat Line	291	120 feet (36.6 m)	Originally owned by Dominion Steamboat. Acquired by WP&YR in 1903. Last used as a powered vessel in 1903. Converted to barge 1st Hootalinqua in 1904. Demolished in a collision at Dawson City, Yukon in 1905.
Columbian	Canada #107091	1898	Victoria, British Columbia	John H. Todd	716	147 feet (44.8 m)	Originally owned by Canadian Development Co. Acquired by WP&YR in 1901. Exploded at Eagle Rock, Yukon in 1906.: Most likely, named for the (British) Columbia, Canada gold rushes of 1850 and 1861.
D. R. Campbell	U.S.A. #157509	1898	Seattle, Washington	Moran Bros. (hull #23)	718	176 feet (53.6 m)	Originally owned by Seattle-Yukon Transportation Co. Transferred to Northern Navigation Co. in 1901. Acquired by WP&YR in 1914. Not used under WP&YR ownership. Sold by WP&YR and abandoned by new owner at St. Michael Canal, Alaska in 1927.: Named for David R. Campbell (1830–1911), a Maine wool manufacturer who financed the SYT Co.
Dalton	U.S.A. #157507	1898	Port Blakely, Washington	Hall Bros.	523	150 feet (45.7 m)	Originally owned by Canadian Pacific Ry. Acquired by WP&YR in 1901. Not used under WP&YR ownership. Sold to S. Willey Steamship & Navigation Co. and renamed Capital City in 1901. Resold to McDonald Steamship Co. in 1903. Resold to Olympia-Tacoma Navigation Co. in 1904. Resold to Dallas, Portland & Astoria Navigation Co. in 1906. Broken up in 1919.: Named for John "Jack" Dalton (1856–1944), Alaskan packer.
Dawson	Canada #107836	1901	Whitehorse, Yukon	W. D. Hofius & Co. for WP&YR	778	167 feet (50.9 m)	Foundered at Rink Rapids, Yukon in 1926.
Delta	U.S.A. #202463	1905	St. Michael, Alaska	Joseph M. Supple and Thomas Achilles	293	120 feet (36.6 m)	Originally owned by Northern Navigation Co. Acquired by WP&YR in 1914. Last used in 1916. Abandoned at St. Michael in 1936.
F. K. Gustin	U.S.A. #121071	1898	Seattle, Washington	Moran Bros. (hull #24)	718	176 feet (53.6 m)	Originally owned by Seattle-Yukon Transportation Co. Transferred to Northern Navigation Co. in 1901. Acquired by WP&YR in 1914. Not used under WP&YR ownership. Abandoned at St. Marys, Alaska in 1917.: Named for Frederick K. Gustin (1856–1937), Chicago, Illinois lawyer, and secretary and treasurer of the SYT Co.
G. M. Dawson	U.S.A. #111544	1901	Vancouver, British Columbia	Canadian Pacific Ry.	550	151 feet (46.0 m)	Originally owned by C.P. Ry. Acquired by WP&YR in 1901. Not used under WP&YR ownership. Stripped and hull sold by WP&YR in 1901. Hull abandoned at Queen Charlotte Island, British Columbia.
Gov. Pingree	......	......	......	......	......	......	See, Bonanza King.
Gleaner	Canada #107526	1899	Bennett, British Columbia	John Irving Navigation Co.	241	113 feet (34.4 m)	Originally owned by Irving Navigation. Acquired by WP&YR in 1901. Last used in 1923. Scuttled in Nares Lake, near the Carcross cemetery, in 1953.: A gleaner is one who gathers a crop after it is reaped.
Hamlin	Canada #107144	1898	Vancouver, British Columbia	Canadian Pacific Ry.	515	146 feet (44.5 m)	Originally owned by C.P. Ry. Acquired by WP&YR in 1901. Not used under WP&YR ownership. Sold to John Banser, William McCallum, and David Reider in 1902. Resold to Thomas J. Kickham in 1904. Resold to Edward J. Coyle (dealer) in 1910. Resold to Hamlin Towing Co. in 1911. Resold to James H. Green in 1917. Resold to Defiance Packing Co. in 1918. Foundered in Fraser River, British Columbia in 1918.: Named for Charles Sumner Hamlin (1861–1938), U.S. delegate to the 1897 Anglo-American fur seal fishing convention.
Hannah	U.S.A. #96428	1898	Unalaska, Alaska	Howard Shipyards & Dock Co.	1130	223 feet (68.0 m)	Originally owned by Alaska Commercial Co. Transferred to Northern Navigation Co. in 1901. Acquired by WP&YR in 1914. Not used under WP&YR ownership. Abandoned at St. Michael, Alaska in 1917. Demolished by fire at St. Michael shortly after 1944. Had a horizontal, belt-driven electric generator made by A. L. Ide & Sons. This may be the A. L. Ide & Sons unit that is currently on the beach at St. Michael.: Boat named for Hannah Gerstle (1838–1930), wife of AC Co. president Lewis Gerstle.
Herman	U.S.A. #96398	1898	Dutch Harbor, Alaska	Thomas P. H. Whitelaw	456	175 feet (53.3 m)	Originally owned by Alaska Exploration Co. Transferred to Northern Navigation Co. in 1901. Acquired by WP&YR in 1914. Last used in 1922. Sold by WP&YR and abandoned by new owner at St. Michael, Alaska in 1927.: Named for Herman Liebes (1842–1898), head of the AE Co.
Ida May (Rideout, 1898–1905)	U.S.A. #111182 (1898–1900 & 1905–1917); Canada #107855 (1900–1905)	1898	Stockton, California	California Navigation & Improvement Co.	278	149 feet (45.4 m)	Originally owned by California Yukon Trading Co. On Dall River, Alaska during winter of 1898–1899. Owned by J. A. Smilie by 1902. Sold to Northern Navigation Co. in 1905. Acquired by WP&YR in 1914. Not used under WP&YR ownership. Abandoned at St. Michael, Alaska in 1917.: Originally named for Walter R. Rideout (1867–1926), president of CYT Co.
Isabelle	U.S.A. #100779	1902	St. Michael, Alaska	Elbridge T. "E.T." Barnette	162	87 feet (26.5 m)	Originally owned by Barnette. Sold to Northern Navigation Co. in 1904. Acquired by WP&YR in 1914. Not used under WP&YR ownership. Abandoned at St. Marys, Alaska in 1917.: Named for Isabelle Cleary Barnette (1875–1942), wife of E.T.
J. P. Light	U.S.A. #77296 (1898–1900 & 1905–1927); Canada #107860 (1900–1905)	1898	Seattle, Washington	Moran Bros. (hull #22)	785	176 feet (53.6 m)	Originally owned by British America Corp. (J. Whitaker Wright). Sold to Dawson & White Horse Navigation Co. in 1900. Sold to Coal Creek Coal Co. in 1904. Sold to Tanana Trading Co. in 1905. Sold to North American Transportation & Trading Co. in 1906. Transferred to the Merchants' Yukon Transportation Co. in 1910. Sold to Northern Navigation Co. in 1911. Acquired by WP&YR in 1914. Not used under WP&YR ownership. Sold by WP&YR and abandoned by new owner at St. Michael Canal, Alaska in 1927.: Named for Joseph P. Light (1846–1922), vice president of the Seattle-Yukon Transportation Co.
John C. Barr	U.S.A. #77326 (1898–1899 & 1902–1927); Canada #107853 (1899–1902)	1898	Dutch Harbor, Alaska	Craig Shipbuilding	546	145 feet (44.2 m)	Originally owned by North American Transportation & Trading Co. Transferred to the Merchants' Yukon Transportation Co. in 1910. Sold to Northern Navigation Co. in 1911. Acquired by WP&YR in 1914. Not used under WP&YR ownership. Converted to stationary power plant for marine ways at St. Michael, Alaska in 1917. Sold by WP&YR and abandoned by new owner at St. Michael in 1927.: Named for Capt. John C. Barr (1844–1925), of the NAT&T Co.
John Cudahy	U.S.A. #77334	1898	Dutch Harbor, Alaska	Moran Bros. (hull #14)	819	192 feet (58.5 m)	Originally owned by North American Transportation & Trading Co. Transferred to the Merchants' Yukon Transportation Co. in 1910. Sold to Northern Navigation Co. in 1911. Acquired by WP&YR in 1914. Not used under WP&YR ownership. Sold by WP&YR and abandoned by new owner at St. Michael, Alaska in 1927.: Named for John Cudahy (1843–1915), Chicago merchant and director of NAT&T Co.
John J. Healy	U.S.A. #77238	1898	St. Michael, Alaska	North American Transportation & Trading Co.	450	175 feet (53.3 m)	Originally owned by NAT&T Co. Transferred to the Merchants' Yukon Transportation Co. in 1910. Sold to Northern Navigation Co. in 1911. Acquired by WP&YR in 1914. Not used under WP&YR ownership. Sold by WP&YR and abandoned by new owner at St. Michael in 1927.
Joseph Clossett	Canada #107621	1898	Bennett, British Columbia	John F. Steffan	147	80 feet (24.4 m)	Originally owned by William J. Rant. Sold to Upper Yukon Co., and resold to Canadian Development Co. in 1899. Acquired by WP&YR in 1901. Last used in 1903. Broken up at Whitehorse, Yukon in 1931.: Named for Joseph Clossett (1845–1915), of Portland, Oregon.
Julia B	U.S.A. #205169	1908	Seattle, Washington	Cook & Lake Shipyards	835	159 feet (48.5 m)	Originally owned by Yukon Transportation & Trading Co. Sold to the Western Transportation Co. in 1912. Acquired by WP&YR in 1918. Last used in 1923. Sold by WP&YR and abandoned by new owner near Dawson City, Yukon in 1942.: Named for Julia M. Burrichter (1871–1933), wife of YT&T Co. owner Frank J. Burrichter.
Keno	Canada #116618	1922	Whitehorse, Yukon	WP&YR	613	141 feet (43.0 m)	Last used by WP&YR in 1950. Transferred to Canadian Government in 1960. Last commercial steamboat to operate under its own power on the Yukon River, run from Whitehorse to Dawson City, Yukon, August 26–29, 1960. Put on display at Dawson City in 1960.: Keno was ultimately derived from a French term which means five winning numbers; a game of chance. The boat was immediately named for the Keno claim, staked in 1919 by Alfred Kirk Schellinger.
1st Klondike	Canada #116627	1929	Whitehorse, Yukon	WP&YR	1285	210 feet (64.0 m)	Foundered at Hootalinqua, Yukon in 1936.: Klondike was derived from the Hän idiom Tr'o Ndek, which figuratively means hammer river. Literally, it means Chinook (King) Salmon River. The reason for the figurative meaning is that hammers had been used to erect fishing weirs in the Klondike River, in order to catch the Chinook salmon.
2nd Klondike	Canada #156744	1937	Whitehorse, Yukon	WP&YR	1363	210 feet (64.0 m)	Last steamboat in regular service on the Upper Yukon River: completed its last voyage on July 4, 1955. Transferred to Canadian Government in 1960. Put on display at Whitehorse in 1966.: Klondike was derived from the Hän idiom Tr'o Ndek, which figuratively means hammer river. Literally, it means Chinook (King) Salmon River. The reason for the figurative meaning is that hammers had been used to erect fishing weirs in the Klondike River, in order to catch the Chinook salmon.
Klondyke	U.S.A. #161114	1898	Dutch Harbor, Alaska	Moran Bros. (hull #13)	406	121 feet (36.9 m)	Originally owned by North American Transportation & Trading Co. Transferred to the Merchants' Yukon Transportation Co. in 1910. Sold to Northern Navigation Co. in 1911. Acquired by WP&YR in 1914. Last used in 1917. Abandoned at St. Michael, Alaska in 1936.: Klondyke was derived from the Hän idiom Tr'o Ndek, which figuratively means hammer river. Literally, it means Chinook (King) Salmon River. The reason for the figurative meaning is that hammers had been used to erect fishing weirs in the Klondike River, in order to catch the Chinook salmon.
LaFrance	Canada #107866	1902	Lower Laberge, Yukon	Edward J. Smythe	201	100 feet (30.5 m)	Originally owned by Merchants Transportation Co. Acquired by WP&YR in 1903. Last used by WP&YR in 1905. Sold to Side Streams Navigation Co. in 1908. Foundered and demolished by fire near the mouth of LaFrance Creek, Yukon in 1911.: Named for Edmond "Edward" LaFrance (1861–1908), Winnipeg butcher, Yukon cattle dealer.
Lavelle Young	U.S.A. #141529	1898	Portland, Oregon	Joseph Paquette	506	140 feet (42.7 m)	Originally owned by Columbia River Pilots Assn. At Peavey, Alaska on the Koyukuk River during the winter of 1898–1899. Sold to Capt. Charles W. Adams, Thomas Bruce, and George Crummy in 1900. Sold to Northern Navigation Co. in 1903. Acquired by WP&YR in 1914. Not used under WP&YR ownership. Sold to Thomas A. McGowan and converted to a barge in 1920. Subsequently, abandoned at McGrath, Alaska. Remains are on display at Pioneer Park, Fairbanks, Alaska.: Named for Lavelle Gilbert, née Young (1896–1994), granddaughter of Charles W. Young, a prominent shipper on the Columbia River.
Leon	U.S.A. #141533	1898	Dutch Harbor, Alaska	Thomas P. H. Whitelaw	638	181 feet (55.2 m)	Originally owned by Alaska Exploration Co. Transferred to Northern Navigation Co. in 1901. Acquired by WP&YR in 1914. Not used under WP&YR ownership. Abandoned at St. Michael, Alaska in 1943.: Named for Leon Liebes (1886–1951), son of AE Co. president Isaac Liebes.
Lightning	Canada #107156	1898	Vancouver, British Columbia	B.C. Iron Works	557	140 feet (42.7 m)	Originally owned by British America Corp. (J. Whitaker Wright). Sold to Dawson & White Horse Navigation Co. in 1900. Resold to Coal Creek Coal Co. in 1903. Resold to Sour Dough Coal Co. in 1907. Resold to Northern Light, Power & Coal Co. in 1909. Acquired by WP&YR in 1917. Not used under WP&YR ownership. Broken up at Dawson City, Yukon in 1918.
Linda	U.S.A. #141561	1898	Dutch Harbor, Alaska	Thomas P. H. Whitelaw	692	181 feet (55.2 m)	Originally owned by Alaska Exploration Co. Transferred to Northern Navigation Co. in 1901. Acquired by WP&YR in 1914. Not used under WP&YR ownership. Abandoned across the bay from St. Michael, Alaska in 1917.: Named for Linda Liebes Lederman (1884–1964), daughter of AE Co. president Isaac Liebes.
Louise	U.S.A. #141572	1898	Unalaska, Alaska	Howard Shipyards & Dock Co.	717	165 feet (50.3 m)	Originally owned by Alaska Commercial Co. Transferred to Northern Navigation Co. in 1901. Acquired by WP&YR in 1914. Last used in 1920. Abandoned at St. Michael, Alaska in 1943.: Named for Louisa Greenewald (1836–1917), wife of AC Co. official Simon Greenewald.
M. L. Washburn	U.S.A. #209341	1911	St. Michael, Alaska	Northern Navigation Co.	284	120 feet (36.6 m)	Originally owned by Northern Navigation. Acquired by WP&YR in 1914. Foundered just south of Little Salmon, Yukon in 1920.: Named for Martin L. Washburn (1854–1911), general manager of the NN Co.
Margaret	U.S.A. #92890	1897	St. Michael, Alaska	Alaska Commercial Co.	520	140 feet (42.7 m)	Originally owned by Alaska Commercial Co. Hull previously had been barge St. Michael No. 1 (U.S.A. Official No. 57983, built in 1896). Transferred to Northern Navigation Co. in 1901. Acquired by WP&YR in 1914. Not used under WP&YR ownership. Abandoned at St. Marys, Alaska in 1917.: Named for Margaret Stern, née Wilson (1895–1973), daughter of AC Co. superintendent James M. Wilson.
Mary F. Graff	U.S.A. #92856 (1898–1900); Canada #107839 (1900–1928)	1898	Seattle, Washington	Moran Bros. (hull #30)	864	177 feet (53.9 m)	Built for the British America Corp. (J. Whitaker Wright), but sold to Blue Star Navigation Co. On Dall River, Alaska during the winter of 1898–1899. Sold to Alaska Exploration Co. in 1899. Sold to Canadian Development Co. in 1900. Acquired by WP&YR in 1901. Last used in 1903. Abandoned at Dawson City, Yukon in 1928.: Named for Mary F. Burleigh, née Graff (1874–1962, m. 1898), wife of entrepreneur Andrew F. Burleigh. In 1897, Andrew Burleigh had contracted with Moran to build the Graff and 11 other steamers (hull ##22-33). The contract was part of a scheme to build a railroad from Haines, Alaska to Five Finger Rapids on the Yukon River. But, by the time that the 12 Moran-built steamers were completed, Burleigh no longer had an interest in them or the Haines-Yukon railroad scheme.
May West	......	......	......	......	......	......	See, Vidette.
McConnell	Canada #107152	1898	Vancouver, British Columbia	Canadian Pacific Ry.	729	142 feet (43.3 m)	Originally owned by C.P. Ry. Acquired by WP&YR in 1901. Not used under WP&YR ownership. Stripped and hull sold by WP&YR in 1901.: Named for Richard G. McConnell (1856–1942), the Yukon's foremost geological explorer.
Minneapolis	U.S.A. #92864	1898	Tacoma, Washington	Thomas C. Reed	236	109 feet (33.2 m)	Originally owned by Minnesota & Alaska Development Co. Sold to Alaska Transportation Co. in 1909. Sold to Miners' & Merchants' Cooperative Co. in 1910. Sold to Western Transportation Co. in 1912. Acquired by WP&YR in 1918. Not used under WP&YR ownership. Sold to The Alaska R.R. in 1926. Not used under Alaska R.R. ownership. Abandoned at Chena, Alaska.
Monarch	U.S.A. #92855	1898	Ballard, Washington	Thomas C. Reed	463	150 feet (45.7 m)	Originally owned by Columbia Navigation Co. On Dall River, Alaska during the winter of 1898–1899. Sold to Yukon Independent Transportation Co. in 1901. Resold to Edward R. Sondheim and Dorah W. "D.W." Dobbins in 1904. Resold to Capt. Wallace Langley in 1907. Resold to Peter A. Vachon & Joseph S. Sterling, then resold to Schubach & Hamilton Steamship Co. in 1908. Sold to Northern Navigation Co. in 1913. Acquired by WP&YR in 1914. Not used under WP&YR ownership. Sold by WP&YR and abandoned by new owner at St. Michael, Alaska in 1927. (Not to be confused with Monarch, Canada #107863, not owned by WP&YR: see below.)
Nasutlin (2nd Prospector in 1912 only)	Canada #133738	1912	Whitehorse, Yukon	WP&YR	570 (405, 1912–1937)	141 feet (43.0 m) (115 feet (35.1 m), 1912–1937)	Foundered at Dawson City, Yukon in 1952.: Nasutlin was a loanword used by the Tagish Indians. Its origin was neither Tagish nor Tlingit. (The original Tlingit name for the Nisutlin River had been Héen Tlein [Big River].) The name Nasutlin was borrowed from the Southern Tutchone nàsät-lį, which means strong flow.
Norcom	Canada #116613	1913	St. Michael, Alaska	Hull: Northern Navigation Co.; superstructure: North American Transportation & Trading Co.	352	130 feet (39.6 m)	Originally owned by Northern Navigation Co. Used by that company to penetrate the Dawson City-Whitehorse route. Included superstructure from Evelyn (U.S.A. Official No. 205767), plus a new hull. Sold to WP&YR in 1914. Not used under WP&YR ownership. Remains on display at Hootalinqua Island, Yukon. In deteriorated condition.: Named for the Northern Commercial Co., an affiliate of the Northern Navigation Co.
Ogilvie	Canada #107148	1898	Vancouver, British Columbia	Canadian Pacific Ry.	742	147 feet (44.8 m)	Originally owned by C.P. Ry. Acquired by WP&YR in 1901. Not used under WP&YR ownership. Stripped and hull sold by WP&YR in 1901.
Oil City	U.S.A. #155318	1898	Seattle, Washington	Moran Bros. (hull #33)	718	176 feet (53.6 m)	Originally owned by Standard Oil Co. of California. Sold to Charles W. Adams in 1904. Resold to partnership of Adams, the Dominion Commercial Co., and Mersereau Clark in 1905. Resold to Northern Navigation Co. in 1908. Acquired by WP&YR in 1914. Not used as a boat under WP&YR ownership. Used by WP&YR as an office and warehouse at Holy Cross, Alaska. Abandoned in 1943.
Pilgrim	U.S.A. #150778	1898	Seattle, Washington	Moran Bros. (hull #31)	718	176 feet (53.6 m)	Built for the British America Corp. (J. Whitaker Wright), but sold to Blue Star Navigation Co. Sold to Columbia Navigation Co. in 1900. Resold to British-American Steamship Co. (Frank Waterhouse, Ltd.) in 1899. Resold to Northern Navigation Co. in 1901. Acquired by WP&YR in 1914. Not used under WP&YR ownership. Abandoned across the bay from St. Michael, Alaska in 1917.
Portus B. Weare	U.S.A. #150646	1892	St. Michael, Alaska	North American Transportation & Trading Co.	400	175 feet (53.3 m)	Originally owned by NAT&T Co. Transferred to the Merchants' Yukon Transportation Co. in 1910. Sold to Northern Navigation Co. in 1911. Acquired by WP&YR in 1914. Not used under WP&YR ownership. Sold by WP&YR and abandoned by new owner at St. Michael, Alaska in 1927.: Named for Portus B. Weare (1842–1909), chairman of the NAT&T Co.
1st Prospector	Canada #107865	1901	Whitehorse, Yukon	Stewart River Navigation Co.	263	111 feet (33.8 m)	Originally owned by Stewart River Navigation. Sold to M. McConnell in 1902. Acquired by WP&YR in 1907. Not used under WP&YR ownership. Broken up at McIntyre Creek, Yukon in 1912.: Named for the prospectors that it served.
2nd Prospector	......	......	......	......	......	......	See, Nasutlin.
Reaper	......	......	......	......	......	......	See, Zealandian.
Reliance	U.S.A. #204486	1907	St. Michael, Alaska	St. Johns Shipbuilding Co.	291	120 feet (36.6 m)	Originally owned by Northern Navigation Co. Acquired by WP&YR in 1914. Last used by WP&YR in 1921. Sold to The Alaska R.R. in 1926. Abandoned at Chena, Alaska.: Named after Ft. Reliance, Yukon.
Rideout	......	......	......	......	......	......	See, Ida May.
S. S. Bailey	Canada #107715	1899	Bennett, British Columbia	Louis Paquette	192	110 feet (33.5 m)	Originally owned by Bennett & Atlin Lake Co. Sold to Canadian Development Co. in 1899. Acquired by WP&YR in 1901. Last used in 1904. Broken up at Whitehorse, Yukon in 1931.: Named for Stephen S. Bailey (1845–1925), Spokane, Washington, businessman.
St. Michael	U.S.A. #116816	1898	Seattle, Washington	Moran Bros. (hull #28)	718	176 feet (53.6 m)	Originally owned by Empire Transportation Co. Transferred to Northern Navigation Co. in 1901. Acquired by WP&YR in 1914. Not used under WP&YR ownership. Abandoned at St. Marys, Alaska in 1943.: Village of St. Michael, Alaska named for Vice Admiral Mikhail D. Tebenkov (1802–1872), governor of Russian America.
Sarah	U.S.A. #116856	1898	Unalaska, Alaska	Howard Shipyards & Dock Co.	1130	223 feet (68.0 m)	Originally owned by Alaska Commercial Co. Transferred to Northern Navigation Co. in 1901. Acquired by WP&YR in 1914. Last used in 1918. Sold by WP&YR and abandoned by new owner at St. Michael, Alaska in 1927. Demolished by fire at St. Michael shortly after 1944.: Named for Sarah Sloss (1836–1920), wife of AC Co. general manager Louis Sloss.
Schwatka	U.S.A. #116812	1898	Port Blakely, Washington	Hall Bros.	484	146 feet (44.5 m)	Originally owned by Canadian Pacific Ry. Sold to Charles W. Thebo in 1904. Resold to Northern Navigation Co. in 1907. Acquired by WP&YR in 1914. Last used in 1917. Sold to The Alaska Railroad and abandoned near Dawson City, Yukon in 1942.
Scotia	Canada #107829	1898	Atlin, British Columbia	John Irving Navigation Co.	214	80 feet (24.4 m)	Operated on Atlin Lake. Originally owned by Irving Navigation. Acquired by WP&YR and enlarged to 214 gross tons in 1901. Last used as a boat in 1918. Used as an office by the Norgold's officers from 1937 to 1950. Demolished by fire at Atlin in 1967.: Named for Scotia Bay. Scotia Bay had probably been named in 1898 for Nova Scotia, by prospector Kenneth C. McLaren (1867-1931), who had come from Nova Scotia.
Scout	......	......	......	......	......	......	See, Vidette.
Seattle	U.S.A. #116817	1898	Seattle, Washington	Moran Bros. (hull #25)	718	176 feet (53.6 m)	Originally owned by Empire Transportation Co. Transferred to Northern Navigation Co. in 1901. Acquired by WP&YR in 1914. Not used under WP&YR ownership. Abandoned across the bay from St. Michael, Alaska in 1917.
Seattle No. 3	U.S.A. #116854	1898	Dutch Harbor, Alaska	Moran Bros. (hull #10)	548	151 feet (46.0 m)	Originally owned by Seattle-Yukon Transportation Co. Transferred to Northern Navigation Co. in 1901. Acquired by WP&YR in 1914. Last used in 1922. Sold to The Alaska Railroad and abandoned near Dawson City, Yukon in 1942.
Selkirk	Canada #107835	1901	Whitehorse, Yukon	W. D. Hofius & Co. for WP&YR	777	167 feet (50.9 m)	Foundered at the mouth of the Stewart River, Yukon in 1920.
Susie	U.S.A. #116855	1898	Unalaska, Alaska	Howard Shipyards & Dock Co.	1130	223 feet (68.0 m)	Originally owned by Alaska Commercial Co. Transferred to Northern Navigation Co. in 1901. Acquired by WP&YR in 1914. Last used in 1917. Sold to The Alaska Railroad and abandoned at St. Michael, Alaska in 1942. Demolished by fire at St. Michael shortly after 1944.: Named for Suzanne Niebaum (1851–1936), wife of AC Co. vice president Capt. Gustave F. Niebaum.
Sybil	Canada #107523	1898	Victoria, British Columbia	James C. Stratford	653 (622, 1898–1901)	167 feet (50.9 m) (101 feet (30.8 m), 1898–1901)	Originally owned by British-American Steamship Co. (Frank Waterhouse, Ltd.). Sold to Canadian Development Co. in 1900. Acquired by WP&YR in 1901. Last used as a powered vessel in 1903. Converted to barge in 1904. Wrecked by ice at Dawson City, Yukon in 1918.
T. C. Power	U.S.A. #145790	1898	Dutch Harbor, Alaska	Moran Bros. (hull #17)	819	192 feet (58.5 m)	Originally owned by North American Transportation & Trading Co. Transferred to the Merchants' Yukon Transportation Co. in 1910. Sold to Northern Navigation Co. in 1911. Acquired by WP&YR in 1914. Not used under WP&YR ownership. Sold by WP&YR and abandoned by new owner at St. Michael, Alaska in 1927.
Tacoma	U.S.A. #145773	1898	Seattle, Washington	Moran Bros. (hull #26)	718	176 feet (53.6 m)	Originally owned by Empire Transportation Co. Transferred to Northern Navigation Co. in 1901. Acquired by WP&YR in 1914. Not used under WP&YR ownership. Abandoned at St. Marys, Alaska in 1927.
Tanana	U.S.A. #201297	1904	St. Michael, Alaska	Northern Commercial Co.	495	150 feet (45.7 m)	Originally owned by Northern Navigation Co. Acquired by WP&YR in 1914. Foundered at Minto, Alaska in 1921.: Tanana derived from the Lower Tanana phrase tene no’, which is not the name of the Tanana River, but is the name of the village. Means river trail.
Thistle	Canada #107867	1902	Lower Laberge, Yukon	Donald McPhee	225	102 feet (31.1 m)	Originally owned by Merchants Transportation Co. Acquired by WP&YR in 1903. Sold to Taylor & Drury in 1919. Foundered in Lake Laberge, Yukon in 1929.: Named for Thistle Creek, site of minor gold excitement in 1898.
Tutshi	Canada #138695	1917	Carcross, Yukon	Cousins Bros. for WP&YR	1041	167 feet (50.9 m)	Last steamboat in regular service in the Yukon: last voyage in September 1955. Put on display at Carcross in 1972. Demolished by fire (arson) at Carcross in 1990.: Tutshi was derived from the Tlingit metaphor t’ooch’ áayi, which literally means charcoal lake, and figuratively means dark lake. Tutshi Lake is darker than most lakes in the region because it is not fed by glacial runoff.
Tyrrell	Canada #107159	1898	Vancouver, British Columbia	Canadian Pacific Ry.	678	142 feet (43.3 m)	Originally owned by C.P. Ry. Sold to British America Corp. (J. Whitaker Wright) in 1898. Resold to Dawson & White Horse Navigation Co. in 1900. Resold to John M. Carson in 1904. Resold to Frank W. Arnold in 1905. Acquired by WP&YR in 1906. Not used under WP&YR ownership. Broken up at Dawson City, Yukon in 1918.
Victoria	U.S.A. #116811	1898	Seattle, Washington	Moran Bros. (hull #27)	718	176 feet (53.6 m)	Originally owned by Empire Transportation Co. Transferred to Northern Navigation Co. in 1901. Acquired by WP&YR in 1914. Not used under WP&YR ownership. Abandoned at St. Marys, Alaska in 1927.
Victorian	Canada #103917	1898	Victoria, British Columbia	John H. Todd	716	146 feet (44.5 m)	Originally owned by Canadian Development Co. Acquired by WP&YR in 1901. Last used in 1908. Broken up at Dawson City, Yukon in 1928.: Most likely, named for the Victoria, Australia gold rush of 1851.
Vidette (May West, 1897–1902; Scout, 1902–1903)	U.S.A. #92896 (1897–1902); Canada #107869 (1902–1917)	1897	St. Michael, Alaska	Payson C. Richardson, Sr.	254 (134, 1897–1911)	119 feet (36.3 m) (96 feet (29.3 m), 1897–1911)	Originally owned by Richardson. Transferred to George B. Wilson in 1901. Sold to the North-West Mounted Police in 1902. Sold to Side Streams Navigation Co. in 1911. Rename to Yorke Barrington proposed in 1911, but never accomplished. Acquired by WP&YR in 1916. Foundered in Lake Laberge, Yukon in 1917.: Originally named for Anna May Richardson, née West (1862–1939), wife of Payson C., Sr. Vidette is a misspelling of vedette, which is a mounted sentinel in advance of an army for observing enemy activities.
White Horse	......	......	......	......	......	......	See, Whitehorse.
White Seal	U.S.A. #202409	1905	Fairbanks, Alaska	George P. Sproul, George Coleman, and Bert Smith	193	97 feet (29.6 m)	Originally owned by Sproul. Owned by Tanana Mines R.R. for a short time in 1905, but ownership reverted to Sproul. Acquired by WP&YR in 1915. Not used under WP&YR ownership. Sold to The Alaska Railroad in 1926. Immediately resold by The A.R.R.: Named after Kotik, a character in The Jungle Book by Rudyard Kipling.
Whitehorse (White Horse, 1901–1930)	Canada #107837	1901	Whitehorse, Yukon	W. D. Hofius & Co. for WP&YR	1120 (986, 1901–1930)	171 feet (52.1 m) (167 feet (50.9 m), 1901–1930)	Last used in 1953. Transferred to Canadian Government in 1960. Demolished by fire (arson) at Whitehorse in 1974.: White Horse was an early spelling of Whitehorse; refers to appearance of rapids in Yukon River.
Wilbur Crimmin	U.S.A. #81606 (1898–1900 & 1906–1935); Canada #107864 (1900–1906)	1898	Coupeville, Washington	Howard B. Lovejoy	124	80 feet (24.4 m)	Originally owned by John D. Crimmin, Jr. At Peavey, Alaska on the Koyukuk River during the winter of 1898–1899. Sold to Wallace Langley and A. John Engvick in 1900. Transferred to Langley, alone, in 1904. Sold to Charles W. Adams, Dominion Commercial Co., and Mersereau & Clark in 1906. Resesold to Northern Navigation Co. in 1908. Acquired by WP&YR in 1914. Not used under WP&YR ownership. Sold to Waechter Bros. in 1923. Abandoned at Seward, Alaska in 1935.: Named for Exilona L. Wilbur (1845–1920) and John D. Crimmin, Sr. (1835–1906), parents of John D., Jr.
Will H. Isom	U.S.A. #81758	1901	Ballard, Washington	Andrew Axton & Son Co.	983	184 feet (56.1 m)	Originally owned by North American Transportation & Trading Co. Forced ashore by ice storm at Point Romanof, Alaska on August 20, 1902. Towed to St. Michael, Alaska, in 1903, never to run again. Transferred to the Merchants' Yukon Transportation Co. in 1910. Sold to Northern Navigation Co. in 1911. Acquired by WP&YR in 1914. Not used under WP&YR ownership. Sold by WP&YR and abandoned by new owner at St. Michael in 1927.: Named for William H. Isom (1828–1929), vice president of the NAT&T Co.
Yorke Barrington	......	......	......	......	......	......	See, Remarks for Vidette.
2nd Yukon	U.S.A. #165172	1913	Seattle, Washington (hull); Whitehorse, Yukon (superstructure)	Nilson & Kelez Shipbuilding Corp. (hull); WP&YR (superstructure)	651	170 feet (51.8 m)	Sold to The Alaska R.R. in 1942. Damaged by ice at Tanana, Alaska in 1947. Demolished by fire at Tanana in 1948.: The name Yukon, or ųųg han, is a contraction of the words in the Gwichʼin phrase chųų gąįį han, which mean white water river and which refer to "the pale colour" of glacial runoff in the Yukon River. The contraction is Ųųg Han, if the \ųų\ remains nasalized, or Yuk Han, if there is no vowel nasalization. In the 1840s, different tribes had different opinions as to the literal meaning of Yukon. In 1843, the Holikachuks had told the Russian-American Company that their name for the river was Yukkhana and that this name meant "big river." However, Yukkhana does not literally correspond to a Holikachuk phrase that means big river. Then, two years later, the Gwichʼins told the Hudson's Bay Company that their name for the river was Yukon and that the name meant white water river. White water river in fact corresponds to Gwichʼin words that can be shortened to form Yukon. Because the Holikachuks had been trading regularly with both the Gwichʼins and the Yup'iks, the Holikachuks were in a position to borrow the Gwichʼin contraction and to conflate its meaning with the meaning of Kuig-pak [River-big], which is the Yup'ik name for the same river. For that reason, the documentary evidence suggests that the Holikachuks had borrowed the contraction Ųųg Han [White Water River] from Gwichʼin, and erroneously assumed that this contraction had the same literal meaning as the corresponding Yup'ik name Kuig-pak [River-big].
Yukoner	Canada #107098	1898	St. Michael, Alaska	Canadian Pacific Navigation Co. (not associated with Canadian Pacific Ry. at the time)	781	171 feet (52.1 m)	Originally owned by CP Nav. Co. (not associated with C.P. Ry. at the time). Sold to North British American Trading & Transportation Co. in 1898. Resold to Trading & Exploration Co. in 1899. Resold to Canadian Development Co. in 1900. Acquired by WP&YR in 1901. Last used in 1903. Sold and broken up at Whitehorse, Yukon in 1957.: For remarks relating to the name Yukon, see, Remarks for 2nd Yukon, U.S.A. #165172, above.
Zealandian (Reaper in 1900 only)	Canada #107830	1900	Bennett, British Columbia	Alexander Watson	179	102 feet (31.1 m)	Originally owned by John Irving Navigation Co. and named Reaper. Sold to the Canadian Development Co. and renamed Zealandian in 1900. Acquired by WP&YR in 1901. Last used in 1904. Broken up at Whitehorse, Yukon in 1913.: Most likely, named for the Otago, New Zealand gold rush of 1864.

White Pass Steam Power – Screw Propeller Boats (5 vessels)
Name	Registry	Year built	Where Built	Builder	Volume (gross tons)	Hull Length	Remarks
C. H. Bradley	U.S.A. #127254	1898	Ballard, Washington	Dusty Diamond Corp. (of Chicago, Illinois)	29	70 feet	Originally owned by the Dusty Diamond Corp. At Fish River, Alaska during winter of 1898–1899. Sold to Alaska Exploration Co. in 1899. Transferred to Northern Navigation Co. in 1901. Wrecked at St. Michael, Alaska in 1904. Acquired by WP&YR in 1914. Not used under WP&YR ownership. Abandoned across the bay from St. Michael in 1915.: If Mr. Bradley was from the same city as the Dusty Diamond Corp. (Chicago), then he would have been Charles Hodgson Bradley (1850–1924), Chief Clerk of the Cook County Circuit Court, and a prominent city politician.
Meteor	U.S.A. #93031	1900	San Francisco, California	United Engineering Works	68	76 feet	Originally owned by Alaska Exploration Co. Transferred to Northern Navigation Co. in 1901. Acquired by WP&YR in 1914. Sold Frank P. Williams in 1923. Converted to Diesel power and enlarged from 68 to 83 gross tons in 1934. Williams died in 1952. Meteor resold to Patrick E. Stoppleman in 1957. Resold to Gulf Navigation & Towing, Ltd. in 1962. Stranded at Coal Harbor, Unga Island, Alaska in 1963.
Omega	Canada #107932	1900	Bennett, British Columbia	Pacific Contract Co. for WP&YR	127	99 feet	Used during railroad construction. Broken up in 1901.
Tasmanian (steamer)	Canada #111786	1899	Chiswick, United Kingdom (hull); Bennett, British Columbia (superstructure)	John I. Thornycroft & Co. (hull); Canadian Development Co. (superstructure)	21	64 feet	Originally owned by Canadian Development. Acquired by WP&YR in 1901. Used as a launch. Last used by WP&YR in 1901. Sold to Eliza E. Wallace (Mrs. Alfred Wallace) in 1904. Resold to George A. Huff in 1906. Resold to British Columbia Steamship Co. in 1910. Resold to Victor Jacobson in 1911. Resold to Leopold A. Bernays in 1912. Retired in 1940.: Most likely, named for the Beaconsfield, Tasmania gold rush of 1877.
Torpedo Catcher	None	1899	Bennett, British Columbia	Pacific Contract Co. for WP&YR			Used during railroad construction for transporting goods from Bennett to Carcross. Broken up in 1901. Triple screw propeller system with upright boilers. Built like a big skiff using some parts that miners abandoned. Poor quality. To show the rear, as it was rectangular, the builder wrote "stern" on one end randomly.: Torpedo catcher is a reference to the slow speed of the boat.
Proposed Steam Scow	None	proposed for 1900	........	........	........	........	Ordered to be built by Pacific Contract Co. No further evidence of the existence of this boat.

White Pass Gasoline Power – Screw Propeller Boats (28 vessels)
Name	Registry	Year built	Where Built	Builder	Volume (gross tons)	Hull Length	Remarks
Anna	None	1913				41 feet	Acquired by WP&YR in 1922. Sold by WP&YR in 1923.
Brandt	None	1929	Vancouver, British Columbia	Turner Boat Works		35 feet	Built for WP&YR. Exploded at Indian Point, British Columbia in 1947.
Dodo	None	1917					Built for WP&YR. Used by WP&YR Mail Service Department until 1925. Last used by WP&YR in 1926. Sold in 1939.
Donjek	None	by 1915					Acquired by WP&YR in 1915. Sold to George Turner in 1923.: Donjek was derived from the Northern Tutchone phrase dan jík, which means silverberry.
Dory	None	by 1899				20 feet	Acquired by WP&YR in 1899. Used on Summit Lake during June 1899. Last used by WP&YR in 1899.
Falcon	None	1908	Whitehorse, Yukon	WP&YR			Used by WP&YR Mail Service Department. Disposed of in 1918.
Hawk	None	1919	Whitehorse, Yukon	WP&YR			Wrecked in 1921. Abandoned in 1922.
Hazel B	None	1914	Lake Laberge, Yukon	Side Streams Navigation Co.	15	43 feet	Originally owned by Side Streams Navigation Co. Acquired by WP&YR in 1916. Wrecked by ice in 1944.: Named for Hazel Barrington (1877–1954), wife of SSN Co. president, Capt. Sydney C. Barrington.
Keno Work Boat	None	1948					Built for WP&YR. Last used by WP&YR in 1950. Disposed of between 1950 & 1958.: Keno was derived from a French term which means five winning numbers; a game of chance. The boat was ultimately named for the Keno claim, staked in 1919 by Alfred Kirk Schellinger.
Kotlik	None	1916	Seattle, Washington				Built for WP&YR. Last used by WP&YR in 1922. Sold by WP&YR in 1924.: Kotlik was derived from the Yup'ik metaphor qerrullik, which literally means a pair of pants, and figuratively refers to a fork in the river.
Loon	(Yukon Registration 2.J.1)	1922	Whitehorse, Yukon	WP&YR	30 (estimate)	54 feet	Last used by WP&YR in 1951. Transferred to Canadian Park Service in 1998. Transferred to Marc Johnson in 2005. Transferred to Silver Trail Tourism Assn. (Mayo, Yukon) in 2006.
Norgold	None	1934	Vancouver, British Columbia	Boeing Aircraft of Canada, Ltd.	6 (estimate)	29 feet	Originally owned by Norgold Mines, Ltd. Sold to Bobjo Mines in 1935. Acquired by WP&YR in 1937. Last used by WP&YR in 1950. Sold to A. E. Prince about 1952. Transferred to Canadian Park Service by 1998. Hull is hopelessly rotted.: Named after Norgold Mines, Ltd.
Olof	......	......	......	......	......	......	See, Splegatus.
Pelican	None	1908	Morris Heights, New York	Charles L. Seabury & Co.		32 feet	Originally owned by the Episcopal Church. Used by Ven. Hudson Stuck. Acquired by WP&YR in 1919. Used by WP&YR Mail Service Department in 1924. Last used in 1924. Abandoned at Yukon Dam in 1942.
Pete	None	by 1948					Acquired by WP&YR in 1948. Last used by WP&YR in 1951. Disposed of between 1950 & 1955.
Pilot No. 2	None	1913			18	30 feet	Originally owned by Northern Commercial Co. Acquired by WP&YR in 1914. Last used by WP&YR in 1924. Abandoned at Dawson City, Yukon in 1942.
Rapid	......	......	......	......	......	......	See, Teal.
Relief	None	1903	St. Michael, Alaska	Northern Commercial Co.		35 feet	Originally owned by Northern Commercial. Acquired by WP&YR from Northern Commercial Co. in 1918. Sold back to Northern Commercial in 1923.
Sea Sled	None	1928	Seattle, Washington	Pacific Marine			Originally owned by WP&YR. Last used by WP&YR in 1933. Engine removed in 1940. Remainder of boat sold in 1945.
Shushanna	None	by 1919					Acquired by WP&YR in 1919. Wrecked by ice at Whitehorse in 1920.: Shushanna was derived from the Ahtna phrase tsetsaan’ na’, which means copper creek. Not a reference to the Copper River.
1st Sibilla (Sybilla, 1913–1914)	(Yukon Registration 2.J.2)	1913	Whitehorse, Yukon	WP&YR	7	45 feet	Used by WP&YR Mail Service Department from 1913 to 1915. Sold to U.S. Government in 1923, and resold to the Northern Commercial Co. in 1923.: Sibilla had been the name of the yacht on which the financier of the WP&YR, namely William B. Close, spent much of his youth. The White Pass & Yukon Ry. Directors' Report to the 30th June 1914 reported the name to be Sybilla, an incorrect spelling of Sibilla. A copy of this report undoubtedly went to Mr. Close. The spelling was corrected shortly thereafter.
2nd Sibilla	None	1932	Whitehorse, Yukon	WP&YR	20 (estimate)	55 feet	Sold to George T. Simmons in 1955. Resold to Robert Cousins in the 1960s. Resold to James Fordyce in 1971. Resold to Hans and Sylvia Kutschera about 1978. Resold to Janice Wotton in 1993, who moved it to 272 Tagish Ave. in 1998. Resold to Greg Kehoe in 2004. Resold to Jamie Toole in 2011 or 2012. In deteriorated condition.: Sibilla had been the name of the yacht on which the financier of the WP&YR, namely William B. Close, spent much of his youth.
Splegatus (Olof in 1913 only)	None	1913	White River, Yukon	Charles M. Binkley, Sr.		50 feet	Originally owned by Max Nelson. Sold to Side Streams Navigation Co. in 1913. Acquired by WP&YR in 1916. Used by WP&YR Mail Service Department from 1919 until 1925. Last used by WP&YR in 1925. Disposed of between 1950 & 1955.: Boat renamed in 1913 for Hock “Splotus” Dennis (1878-1917), cook for the Barrington brothers, from 1906 to 1916.
Tarahne	Canada #138539	1917	Atlin, British Columbia	Cousins Bros. for WP&YR	286 (177, 1917–1928)	119 feet (78 feet, 1917–1928)	Operated on Atlin Lake only. Last used as a boat in 1936. On display at Atlin. Used as restaurant.: "Tarahne" was directly derived from Tarahini, which was the name of a little creek at Atlin. The name Tarahini was suggested to the ship's carpenter by Chief Taku Jack (John Jack, Sr.). Previously, Tarahini had been derived from the Tlingit phrase té yaa .aa hini, which means stream sitting along rock. Tarahini had been derived by eliminating yaa and by substituting the English \ra\ sound for the Tlingit aspirated \.aa\ sound. Thus, all vocal sounds in Tarahini occur in English. The reason for the subsequent change from Tarahini to "Tarahne" is not known.
Tasmanian (launch)	None	1900	Chiswick, United Kingdom (hull); Bennett, British Columbia (superstructure)	John I. Thornycroft & Co. (hull); Canadian Development Co. (superstructure)	21	64 feet	Originally owned by Canadian Development. Name Launch Zealandian proposed prior to build, but name Launch Tasmanian adopted instead. Acquired by WP&YR in 1901. Not used under WP&YR ownership. Sold by WP&YR and sent to Vancouver, British Columbia in 1902.: Most likely, named for the Beaconsfield, Tasmania gold rush of 1877.
Teal (Rapid, 1908–1909)	None	1908	Whitehorse, Yukon	WP&YR			Originally owned by WP&YR. Last used by WP&YR in 1922. Disposed of between 1950 & 1955.
Tyee	None	by 1912					Acquired by WP&YR in 1912. Last used by WP&YR in 1912. Sold by WP&YR in 1923.: Tyee a is Chinook Jargon term, which means chief.
Wahpoo	None	1918					Acquired by WP&YR in 1919. Last used by WP&YR in 1924. Abandoned at St. Michael, Alaska in 1927.: "Wahpoo" was the nickname of WP&YR Traffic Manager Albert F. Zipf (1873–1936), derived from a Yup'ik phrase, which means to shout or to scream.
Warrior	U.S.A. #204935	1905	Pittsburg, California	Siino Boat Works	7	34 feet	Acquired by WP&YR in 1918. Sold to Frank P. Williams in 1923. Converted to Diesel power in 1947. Resold to Northern Commercial Co. in 1949. Destroyed by a storm at St. Michael, Alaska in July 1965.
Woodchuck	None	1939	Whitehorse, Yukon	WP&YR	8 (estimate)	37 feet	Originally owned by WP&YR. Last used by WP&YR in 1951. Leased to Prospectors Airways in 1954. Sold to Ollie MacDonald in 1960. Transferred to McBride Museum in 2012. Restored in 2014.
Zealandian (launch)	......	......	......	......	......	......	See, Launch Tasmanian.

White Pass Diesel Power – Screw Propeller Boats (6 vessels)
Name	Registry (-ies)	Year built	Where Built	Builder	Volume (gross tons)	Hull Length	Remarks
Clifford J. Rogers	Canada #198983 (1955–1966); U.K. #198983 (1966–1969); Liberia #3412 (1969–1975)	1955	Montreal, Quebec	Canadian Vickers Shipyards, Ltd. (hull #265)	3000	335 feet	Container ship. Originally owned by WP&YR. Constructed in response to decisions by Canadian Pacific Ry. and Union Steamships Ltd. not to handle container traffic. Used on Inside Passage run between North Vancouver, British Columbia and Skagway, Alaska. Sold to Marine Commerce, Ltd. and registered in United Kingdom in 1966. Resold to Lampsis Navigation, Ltd., renamed Lampsis, and registered in Liberia in 1969. Renamed Drosia in 1972. Sank at 35.26° N, 74.34° W in 1975. Although this location is within the Bermuda Triangle, the loss was not considered particularly mysterious.: Named for Clifford J. Rogers (1887–1970), WP&YR president.
Frank H. Brown	Canada #322244 (1965–1993); Russia #M-44845 (1993–1997); IMO6514170	1965	Montreal, Quebec	Canadian Vickers Shipyards, Ltd. (hull #284)	8040	394 feet	Container ship. Originally owned by WP&YR. Used on Inside Passage run between North Vancouver, British Columbia and Skagway, Alaska. From 1979 to 1981, used as a barge, towed by Pacific Challenge of Knight Towing, Ltd. Reverted to its own power thereafter. Operations suspended from 1983 to 1986. Sold to Portofino, Ltd. and registered in Russia in 1993. Broken up at Chittagong, Bangladesh in 1997.: Named for Frank H. Brown (1894–1975), WP&YR president.
Kestrel	......	......	......	......	......	......	See, Neecheah.
3rd Klondike	Canada #330809; IMO6912449	1969	Montreal, Quebec	Canadian Vickers Shipyards, Ltd. (hull #294)	8043	394 feet	Container ship. Originally owned by WP&YR. Used on Inside Passage run between North Vancouver, British Columbia and Skagway, Alaska. From 1979 to 1981, used as a barge, towed by Pacific Challenge of Knight Towing, Ltd. Continued in use as a barge from 1981 to 1982. Operations suspended in 1982. Sold by WP&YR in 1988. Broken up at Kaohsiung, Taiwan in 1989.: Klondike was derived from the Hän idiom Tr'o Ndek, which figuratively means hammer river. Literally, it means Chinook (King) Salmon River. The reason for the figurative meaning is that hammers had been used to erect fishing weirs in the Klondike River, in order to catch the Chinook salmon.
Lou-Ann I	Canada #158932	1936	Vancouver, British Columbia		17	37 feet	Originally owned by Lynton H. Boyce. Acquired by WP&YR in 1942. Registry closed in 1984.: Named for Louisa J. Boyce (1857–1936), Lynton's mother; and Annie Glew Arnell (1863–1959), Lynton's mother-in-law.
Neecheah (Kestrel, 1920–1921)	U.S.A. #220473 (1920–1922); Canada #116619 (1922–1960)	1920	Whitehorse, Yukon	WP&YR	85 (93, 1922–1942; 53, 1920–1922)	79 feet; 64 feet (1920–1922)	Originally gasoline powered. Converted to Diesel power in 1942. Last used by WP&YR in 1951. Sold and became part of the Riverboat Café, at Alaska Highway Historic Mile 900 (Kilometer 1397), in 1958. Became The Captain Locker restaurant at Alaska Highway Historic Mile 913 (Kilometer 1419) in 1972. Put on display at the Yukon Transportation Museum in 1990.: Neecheah was derived from the Tlingit phrase neech yeil’, which means calm shoreline. This name appears to be a Tlingit language description of the Yukon River just downstream of Whitehorse Rapids, which is grammatically correct, but does not pre-date 1900. Neecheah [Neech Yeil’] appears to be a short Tlingit language description of Whitehorse that was created in 1922 to name the boat. Prior to October 1899, Whitehorse itself had not existed, and there had been no reason for the Indians to give its future location a name.
Yukon Rose	Canada #116630	1929	Vancouver, British Columbia	Askew Boat Works	32	61 feet	Only former WP&YR boat still operating. (But see, Loon Remarks.) Originally, gasoline powered and owned by Taylor & Drury, Ltd. Sold to Jack McDonald in 1943. Acquired by WP&YR in 1948. Converted to Diesel power in 1949. Last used by WP&YR in 1952. Sold to Ray Chaykowski in 1955. Resold to Charlie Garvice by 1961. Resold to Rudy Burian in 1962. Resold to Gregory H. Caple in 1977. Resold to Murray Matchett (M.O.), Ron McCready, and Kevin Hewer in 1984. Resold to Marc Johnson in 2001. Vintage engine installed in 2007, but not original to this vessel. Refloated in 2009.: For remarks relating to the name Yukon, see, Remarks for 2nd Yukon, U.S.A. #165172, above.

White Pass Barges (102 vessels): 25 barges built by White Pass. 58 barges (including 7 not used) purchased from the Northern Navigation and Northern Commercial Cos. 19 barges (including 2 not used) purchased from others.

No. of Barges used in each year: 1903–4; 1904–7; 1905–8; 1906–10; 1907–13; 1908 to 1912–12; 1913–13; 1914 to 1916–63 (reflects purchase of Northern Navigation Co.); 1917–58; 1918 and 1919–55; 1920–54; 1921–47; 1922–45; 1923–42 (reflects end of service west of Tanana); 1924–32; 1925 and 1926–23; 1927 and 1928–24; 1929–26; 1930–22; 1931–21; 1932–22; 1933–21; 1934 to 1937–20; 1938 to 1940–18; 1941–17; 1942–16; 1943–12 (reflects end of service west of Dawson); 1944 to 1947–13; 1948–15; 1949–16; 1950–14; 1951–12.

For the roster of White Pass winter stages, see, Overland Trail (Yukon).

For the roster of White Pass railroad equipment, see, List of White Pass and Yukon Route locomotives and cars.

== Alaska Railroad vessels ==
A.R.R. Steam Power – Stern Wheel Boats (13 vessels)
Name	Registry	Year built	Where Built	Builder	Volume (gross tons)	Hull Length	Remarks
Alice (of Susitna)	U.S.A. #260095	1909	Seattle, Washington	Cook & Lake Shipyards	262	111 feet	Originally owned by Alaska Commercial Co. Sold to Northern Navigation Co. in 1911. Sold to White Pass in 1914. Purchased by A.R.R. in 1926. Retired and sold to the Catholic Church (Holy Cross Mission) in 1953.
Barry K (Lewiston, 1923–1940)	U.S.A. #223498	1923	Portland, Oregon	Supple & Martin	581	160 feet	Originally owned by Oregon-Washington R.R. & Navigation Co. (Union Pacific R.R.). Sold to Western Transportation Co. in 1940. Purchased by A.R.R. in 1944. Retired in 1947. Broken up in 1950.
Duchesnay	......	......	......	......	......	......	See, Gen. Jeff C. Davis.
Gen. J. W. Jacobs	None	1908	Portland, Oregon	Willamette Iron & Steel Works	319	126 feet	Originally owned by U.S. Army. Transferred to Alaskan Engineering Commission in 1922. A.E.C. reorganized as The Alaska Railroad in 1923. Jacobs retired in 1933. Broken up at Nenana, Alaska.: Named for Brig. Gen. Joshua W. Jacobs (1843–1905).
Gen. Jeff C. Davis (Duchesnay, 1898–1900)	Canada #107151	1898	Vancouver, Washington	Canadian Pacific Ry.	277	120 feet	Originally owned by C.P. Ry. Sold to Edward J. Rathbone in 1899. Purchased by U.S. Army in 1900. Transferred to Alaskan Engineering Commission in 1922. A.E.C. reorganized as The Alaska Railroad in 1923. Davis retired and broken up at Nenana, Alaska in 1933.: Originally named for Charles-Edmond J. Duchesnay (1854–1901), civil engineer for the C.P. Ry.
Lewiston	......	......	......	......	......	......	See, Barry K.
Minneapolis	U.S.A. #92864	1898	Tacoma, Washington	Thomas C. Reed	236	109 feet	Originally owned by Minnesota & Alaska Development Co. Sold to Alaska Transportation Co. in 1909. Sold to Miners' & Merchants' Cooperative Co. in 1910. Sold to Western Transportation Co. in 1912. Acquired by White Pass in 1918. Purchased by The Alaska R.R. in 1926. Not used under Alaska R.R. ownership. Abandoned at Chena, Alaska.
Nenana	None	1933	Nenana, Alaska	Berg Shipbuilding Co.	1128	210 feet	No passengers regularly carried after 1949. Leased to Yutana Barge Line in 1954. Last steamboat in regular service on Lower Yukon River, 1954. Officially retired in 1955. Sold to Greater Fairbanks Opportunities, Inc. in 1956. Last voyage under power was from Nenana to Fairbanks, Alaska in May 1957. Put on display at Pioneer Park, Fairbanks in 1965.: Nenana was derived from the Lower Tanana phrase nen’ a no’, which means stopping-while-migrating river. Looks like a contraction or an idiom, because it literally appears to mean something less, such as land by the river.
Omineca	Canada #126248	1909	Victoria, British Columbia	Alexander Watson, Jr.	583	137 feet	Originally owned by Foley, Welch & Stewart. Obtained in 1915 by the Alaskan Engineering Commission. Used on the Susitna River and the Cook Inlet. Retired at the end of 1917. Disposed of sometime between 1923 & 1930. Never on the Yukon River.: Omineca was derived from a Sekani phrase, which means slow moving water.
Reliance	U.S.A. #204486	1907	St. Michael, Alaska	St. Johns Shipbuilding Co.	291	120 feet	Originally owned by Northern Navigation Co. Sold to White Pass in 1914. Purchased by A.R.R. in 1926. Last used in 1926. Abandoned at Chena, Alaska.: Named after Ft. Reliance, Yukon.
Schwatka	U.S.A. #116812	1898	Port Blakely, Washington	Hall Bros.	484	146 feet	Originally owned by Canadian Pacific Ry. Sold to Charles W. Thebo in 1904. Resold to Northern Navigation Co. in 1907. Acquired by White Pass in 1914. Purchased by The Alaska Railroad and abandoned near Dawson City, Yukon in 1942. Not used under Alaska R.R. ownership.
Seattle No. 3	U.S.A. #116854	1898	Dutch Harbor, Alaska	Moran Bros. (hull #10)	548	151 feet	Originally owned by Seattle-Yukon Transportation Co. Transferred to Northern Navigation Co. in 1901. Acquired by White Pass in 1914. Purchased by The Alaska Railroad and abandoned near Dawson City, Yukon in 1942. Not used under Alaska R.R. ownership.
Susie	U.S.A. #116855	1898	Unalaska, Alaska	Howard Shipyards & Dock Co.	1130	223 feet	Originally owned by Alaska Commercial Co. Transferred to Northern Navigation Co. in 1901. Acquired by White Pass in 1914. Purchased by The Alaska Railroad and abandoned at St. Michael, Alaska in 1942. Not used under Alaska R.R. ownership. Demolished by fire at St. Michael shortly after 1944.: Named for Suzanne Niebaum (1851–1936), wife of AC Co. vice president Capt. Gustave F. Niebaum.
White Seal	U.S.A. #202409	1905	Fairbanks, Alaska	George P. Sproul, George Coleman, and Bert Smith	193	97 feet	Originally owned by Sproul. Owned by Tanana Mines R.R. for a short time in 1905, but ownership reverted to Sproul. Acquired by White Pass in 1915. Sold to The Alaska Railroad and immediately resold in 1926. Not used under Alaska R.R. ownership.: Named after Kotik, a character in The Jungle Book by Rudyard Kipling.
2nd Yukon	U.S.A. #165172	1913	Seattle, Washington (hull); Whitehorse, Yukon (superstructure)	Nilson & Kelez Shipbuilding Corp. (hull); White Pass (superstructure)	651	170 feet	Originally owned by White Pass. Purchased by A.R.R. in 1942. Damaged by ice at Tanana, Alaska in 1947. Demolished by fire at Tanana in 1948.: For remarks relating to the name Yukon, see, Remarks for 2nd Yukon, U.S.A. #165172, under White Pass and Yukon Route, above.

A.E.C. Steam Power – Screw Propeller Boats (4 vessels)
Name	Registry	Year built	Where Built	Builder	Volume (gross tons)	Hull Length	Remarks
Anne W	U.S.A. #211862	1913	Portland, Oregon	Portland Shipbuilding Co.	84	88 feet	Originally owned by Hosford Transportation Co. Purchased by Alaskan Engineering Commission in 1915. Used on the Cook Inlet. Sold to Anderson Towboat Co. in 1925. Resold to Pioneer Sand & Gravel Co. in 1927. Converted to Diesel power in 1928. Retired in 1967. Never on the Yukon River.: Named for Anne W. Staley, née Wentworth (1906-fl. 1945), daughter of Portland Lumber Co. vice president Lloyd J. Wentworth.
Crook (Richmond Hill, 1882–1897; Roumanian, 1897–1899)	U.K. #87858	1882	Dumbarton, Scotland	Henry Murray & Co.	4126	420 feet	Originally, owned by the Twin Screw Line. Sold to Austin, Baldwin & Co. in 1897. Sold to the U.S. Army in 1898. Transferred to Alaskan Engineering Commission in 1916. Used between Anchorage and Seattle. Transferred back to the Army in 1918. Broken up in 1920. Never on the Yukon River.
Eklutna	None	by 1917				41 feet	Owned by Alaskan Engineering Commission. Used on the Cook Inlet. Retired at the end of 1917. Disposed of between 1924 & 1930. Never on the Yukon River.: Eklutna was derived from the Dena'ina idiom idlu-tnu, which figuratively refers to two hills near the Eklutna River. Literally, it means objects river, the "objects" being the two hills.
Hero	......	......	......	......	......	......	See, L. Roscoe.
L. Roscoe (Hero, 1918 to 1921~1922; San Pedro, 1921~1922 to 1942)	U.S.A. #200158	1903	Hoquiam, Washington		117	86 feet	Originally owned by Oscar W. Hurd. Oscar died in 1914. Boat purchased by Alaskan Engineering Commission in 1916. Operated on the Cook Inlet. Never on the Yukon River. Sold to Independent Towing Co. in 1918. Resold to San Pedro Launch & Towboat Co. in 1921 or 1922. Resold to J. P. Allender and converted to Gasoline power in 1933 or 1934. Resold to C. M. Wilkins in 1935 or 1936. Resold to Richard E. Nordstrom in 1938 or 1939. Resold to Alicia Dahlin and converted to Diesel power in 1939 or 1940. Disposed of in 1942.: Named for Lionel Roscoe Hurd (1893–1960), son of Oscar W.
Richmond Hill	......	......	......	......	......	......	See, Crook.
Roumanian	......	......	......	......	......	......	See, Crook.
San Pedro	......	......	......	......	......	......	See, L. Roscoe.

A.R.R. Gasoline Power – Stern Wheel Boats (2 vessels)
Name	Registry	Year built	Where Built	Builder	Volume (gross tons)	Hull Length	Remarks
Matanuska	None	1915	Seattle, Washington	Alaskan Engineering Commission		66 feet	A.E.C. reorganized as The Alaska Railroad in 1923. Matanuska transferred to Civil Aeronautics Administration in 1951.: Name derived from an unknown Russian phrase that was corrupted by the Dena'ina Indians, and that relates both to copper (медь → med') and to the Ahtna Indians.
Midnight Sun	None	1911	Whitehorse, Yukon			45 feet (13.7 m)	Originally assigned to the United States Coast and Geodetic Survey. Transferred to the Alaskan Engineering Commission in 1915. Used on the Tanana River. Disposed of between 1924 & 1930.: Most A.E.C. boats that were initially used on the Tanana River had names consisting of "Sun" plus another word.

A.R.R. Gasoline Power – Screw Propeller Boats (11 vessels)
Name	Registry	Year built	Where Built	Builder	Volume (gross tons)	Hull Length	Remarks
Alaska	None	by 1917				42 feet (12.8 m)	Acquired by the Alaskan Engineering Commission in 1917. Used on the Cook Inlet. Disposed of between 1930 & 1942. Never on the Yukon River.: Alaska was derived from an Aleut idiom, which figuratively refers to the mainland of Alaska. Literally, it means object to which the action of the sea is directed.
Alenco	None	by 1918				42 feet (12.8 m)	Acquired by the Alaskan Engineering Commission by 1918. Used on the Cook Inlet. Disposed of between 1919 & 1923. Never on the Yukon River.: Alenco is an acronym, derived from Alaskan Engineering Commission.
B&B No. 1	None	1916	Anchorage, Alaska	Sydney C. Barrington (1875–1963) and Charles M. Binkley, Sr. (1881–1923)		65 feet (19.8 m)	Originally owned by Barrington and Binkley. Transferred to the Alaskan Engineering Commission in 1916. Used on the Susitna River. Disposed of between 1919 & 1923. Never on the Yukon River.: Named for Barrington and Binkley.
B&B No. 2	None	1916	Anchorage, Alaska	Sydney C. Barrington (1875–1963) and Charles M. Binkley, Sr. (1881–1923)		87 feet (26.5 m)	Originally owned by Barrington and Binkley. Transferred to the Alaskan Engineering Commission in 1916. Used on the Susitna River. Disposed of between 1924 & 1930. Never on the Yukon River.: Named for Barrington and Binkley.
B&B No. 3	None	1916	Anchorage, Alaska	Sydney C. Barrington (1875–1963) and Charles M. Binkley, Sr. (1881–1923)		87 feet (26.5 m)	Originally owned by Barrington and Binkley. Transferred to the Alaskan Engineering Commission in 1916. Used on the Susitna River. Disposed of between 1930 & 1942. Never on the Yukon River.: Named for Barrington and Binkley.
Betty M	None	1917	Anchorage, Alaska	Alaskan Engineering Commission		34 feet (10.4 m)	Used on the Susitna River. Disposed of between 1924 & 1930. Never on the Yukon River.: Most likely, named for Elizabeth M. "Betty" Meiggs, née Mears (1910–1992), daughter of AEC commissioner Frederick Mears.
Islander	U.S.A. #210852	1912	Mt. Vernon, Washington		15	47 feet (14.3 m)	Acquired by Alaskan Engineering Commission in 1915. Used on the Cook Inlet. Disposed of between 1919 & 1923. Never on the Yukon River.: Most likely, named for an island or islands in Puget Sound.
Josephine	None	1917	Anchorage, Alaska	Alaskan Engineering Commission		46 feet (14.0 m)	Used on the Susitna River. Disposed of between 1919 & 1923. Never on the Yukon River.: Most likely, named for Josephine W. McVay, née Mears (1908–1965), daughter of AEC commissioner Frederick Mears.
Sunbeam	None	by 1918				32 feet (9.8 m)	Acquired by the Alaskan Engineering Commission by 1918. Used on the Tanana River. Disposed of between 1930 & 1942.: Most A.E.C. boats that were initially used on the Tanana River had names consisting of "Sun" plus another word.
Sunflower	None	by 1918				34 feet (10.4 m)	Acquired by the Alaskan Engineering Commission by 1918. Used on the Tanana River. Disposed of between 1930 & 1942.: Most A.E.C. boats that were initially used on the Tanana River had names consisting of "Sun" plus another word.
Vibienna	None	1917	Anchorage, Alaska	Alaskan Engineering Commission		36 feet (11.0 m)	Owned by A.E.C. Used on the Cook Inlet. Disposed of between 1918 & 1923. Never on the Yukon River.

A.R.R. Diesel Power – Screw Propeller Boats (2 vessels)
Name	Registry	Year built	Where Built	Builder	Volume (gross tons)	Hull Length	Remarks
Bella Catherine	......	......	......	......	......	......	See, Tanana.
Tanana (Bella Catherine, from 2012)	U.S.A. #272122	1953	Portland, Oregon	Albina Engine & Machine Works (hull #278)	450	110 feet (33.5 m)	Purchased new. Leased to Yutana Barge Line from 1954 to 1980. Sold to Yutana Barge Line in 1980. Transferred to Crowley Marine Services, Inc. in 2005. Sold to Nerka Transport LLC in 2012.: Tanana derived from a Lower Tanana phrase, which is not the name of the Tanana River, but is the name of the village. Means river trail.
3rd Yukon	U.S.A. #272121	1953	Portland, Oregon	Albina Engine & Machine Works (hull #277)	336	110 feet (33.5 m)	Purchased new. Leased to Yutana Barge Line from 1954 to 1977. Demolished by fire (suspicious origins) near Hot Springs, Alaska in 1977.: For remarks relating to the name Yukon, see, Remarks for 2nd Yukon, U.S.A. #165172, under White Pass and Yukon Route, above.

== Other vessels ==
The following lists many pre-1955 vessels of the Yukon River, tributaries, and headwaters that are not listed above. It is not a complete list.

Misc. Yukon River Steam Power – Stern Wheel Boats
Name	Registry (-ies)	Year built	Where Built	Builder	Volume (gross tons)	Hull Length	Remarks
A. J. Goddard	Canada #107517	1898	San Francisco, California (hull); Bennett, British Columbia (superstructure)	Risdon Iron Works (hull); James H. Calvert (superstructure)	15	50 feet (15.2 m)	Originally owned by Upper Yukon Co. Sold to Henry A. Munn in 1899. Foundered at the foot of Lake Laberge, Yukon in 1901. Discovered in 2008 by a team of underwater archeologists, slightly damaged and sitting upright on the bottom of Lake Laberge.: Named for Albert J. Goddard (1863–1958).
Alameda (Lully C in 1899 only)	Canada #107257	1898	New Westminster, British Columbia	Coffey & Hanley	32	50 feet (15.2 m)	Originally owned by Upper Yukon Co. Sold to John J. McKenna in 1898. Sold to Victoria Yukon Trading Co. in 1899, and resold back to McKenna later in 1899. Wrecked and abandoned in 1920.
Alaska Union	U.S.A. #107495	1898	Nunivak Island, Alaska	Alaska Union Mining Co.	214	110 feet (33.5 m)	Owned by AUM Co. Stranded at Seaforth, Alaska, on the South Fork of the Koyukuk River in 1899.
Anawanda	U.S.A. #107421	1898	St. Michael, Alaska	Joseph Supple	31	46 feet (14.0 m)	Originally owned by Anawanda Mining & Milling Co. (New York firemen). At Koyukuk River, Alaska during winter of 1898–1899. For sale in 1899. Listed in Jones (1904). Registry closed in 1913 or 1914.
Arctic	U.S.A. #107254	1889	St. Michael, Alaska	Alaska Commercial Co.	42	140 feet (42.7 m)	Owned by AC Co. Wrecked by ice at Forty Mile, Yukon in 1897.
Arctic Boy	U.S.A. #107411	1898	St. Michael, Alaska	U.S. Mining, Development & Lumber Co.	74	124 feet (37.8 m)	Originally owned by USMD&L Co. (of Cincinnati, Ohio). Sold to Elbridge T. "E.T." Barnette and Charles Smith in 1901. Later in 1901, Foundered at St. Michael.
Argo	......	......	......	......	......	......	See, Lieut. Smith.
Athol	U.S.A. #107414	1898	Unalaska, Alaska		16	42 feet (12.8 m)	Not inspected. Registry closed in 1902 or 1903.
Atlas	None	by 1914					Owned by Clarence D. Flanagan. Foundered on the Upper Tanana River in 1916.
1st Atlinto (Glengarry, 1904–1906)	None	1904	Atlin, British Columbia	William J. Smith			Side wheels. Operated on Atlin Lake. Owned by Smith and James D. Durie. Retired in 1907 or 1908.: Atlinto, was derived from the hybrid phrase áa tlein tóo, consisting of the Tlingit phrase for big lake, plus the Tagish word for water: literally, big lake water. In turn, the name Atlinto River literally means big lake water river.
Aurora No. 2	U.S.A. #107359	1898	San Francisco, California		54	63 feet (19.2 m)	Originally owned by Eugene A. Mantell (of San Francisco). At Bergman, Alaska on the Koyukuk River during the winter of 1898–1899. Sold to Alaska Commercial Co. and broken up in 1899.: Court Aurora No. 2 was the San Francisco chapter of the Foresters of America.
Aurum	None	1898	Seattle, Washington		19		Owned by the Aurum Mining Co. (of Seattle). Operated on the Lower Yukon River. Last inspected in 1903. Listed in Jones (1904).
1st Beaver	U.S.A. #3649	1895	Benicia, California		38	59 feet (18.0 m)	Originally owned by Alaska Commercial Co. Sold to Pacific Packing & Navigation Co. in 1897 or 1898. Registry closed in 1912 or 1913.
2nd Beaver	U.S.A. #3763	1898	St. Michael, Alaska	Harry A. Parshall & Co.	35	55 feet (16.8 m)	Owned by Parshall and his company. At Alatna River, Alaska during the winter of 1898–1899. Foundered at St. Michael in 1899.: Parshall and his company were from Beaver and Beaver Falls, Pennsylvania, respectively
Bellingham	None	1897	Bennett, British Columbia	Lewis Stenger and A. H. Willock		35 feet (10.7 m)	Operated on Bennett Lake. Owned by Michael J. Dignan, Stenger, and Willock. Disposed of in 1899.: Bellingham, Washington was the home of Lewis Stenger.
Ben Hur	U.S.A. #205562	1906	Nome, Alaska		46	76 feet (23.2 m)	Owned by William McCamant in 1925. Abandoned in 1926 or 1927.
Blackfoot	None	by 1898					At Hogatza River, Alaska during winter of 1898–1899.
Burpee	Canada #107157	1898	Toronto, Ontario	Polson Iron Works (1 of hull ##30-34)	9	46 feet (14.0 m)	Owned by Isaac Burpee (1875–1951). Registry closed in 1914.
Caribou	U.S.A. #208963	1910	Fairbanks, Alaska		46	57 feet (17.4 m)	Owned by William Daniels. Abandoned in 1923 or 1924.
Carl White	U.S.A. #222058	1919	Fairbanks, Alaska		43	65 feet (19.8 m)	Owned by Carl C. White (1880–1933). Abandoned at Fairbanks in 1926.
City of Bradford	U.S.A. #127288	1898	St. Michael, Alaska		39	44 feet (13.4 m)	Owned by Wenthrop Mining & Trading Co. (of Pennsylvania). Last inspected in 1903. Listed in Jones (1904). Registry closed in 1908 or 1909.
City of Chicago	U.S.A. #127296	1898	St. Michael, Alaska	Joseph Supple	142	85 feet (25.9 m)	Originally owned by John Myers (of Chicago Alaska Transportation Co.). Last inspected in 1898. Sold to Donald Smith in 1899. Registry closed in 1900.
City of Paris	U.S.A. #127269	1898	Seattle, Washington	Richard A. Talbot	300	120 feet (36.6 m)	Originally owned by Paris-Alaska Mining Co. At Koyukuk River, Alaska during winter of 1898–1899. Sold to Alaska Commercial Co. in 1899. Demolished by fire (arson) at Bergman, Alaska in 1901.: Named for Paris, Missouri, home of the Paris-Alaska Mining Co.
City of Sault Ste. Marie	U.S.A. #127827	1898	Dutch Harbor, Alaska		148	93 feet (28.3 m)	Built by a syndicate from Sault Ste. Marie, Michigan for its own use. Sold to North American Transportation & Trading Co. and broken up at Dawson City, Yukon in 1899.
Clara	U.S.A. #127249	1898	San Francisco, California	John Cameron	97	76 feet (23.2 m)	Originally owned by California & Northwest Trading & Mining Co. C&NWT&M Co. dissolved, and boat sold to the Alaska Exploration Co. in 1898. Engines installed into the Monarch (Canada #107863) in 1900. Boat broken up at Dawson City, Yukon in 1901.: Named for Clara E. Roncovieri (1860–1954), wife of C&NWT&M Co. president Alfred Roncovieri.
"Clara Monarch"	......	......	......	......	......	......	See, Monarch, Canada #107863, below.
Clio	U.S.A. #127297	1898	St. Michael, Alaska		34	64 feet (19.5 m)	Registry closed in 1916 or 1917.
D. Armstrong	U.S.A. #157521	1898	St. Michael, Alaska	St. Marys Mining & Milling Co.	32	56 feet (17.1 m)	Originally owned by St. Marys (Ohio) Mining & Milling Co. At Red Mountain Creek (a.k.a. "Lost Woman Creek") on the Koyukuk River during the winter of 1898–1899. Sold to Alaska Commercial Co. in 1900. Wrecked at New Hamilton, Alaska in 1903 or 1904.: Named for David Armstrong, Jr. (1833–1924), merchant in St. Marys, Ohio.
Dora	......	......	......	......	......	......	See, Olive May.
Dorothy	U.S.A. #157505	1898	Seattle, Washington		126	75 feet	Originally owned by Koyukuk Mining & Exploration Co. At Bergman, Alaska on the Koyukuk River during the winter of 1898–1899. KM&E Co. dissolved in 1904. Boat converted to gasoline power in 1911. Registry closed in 1916 or 1917.: Named for Dorothy W. Lund (1897–1972), daughter of Capt. George H. Wonson of the KM&E Co.
Dusty Diamond	U.S.A. #157522	1898	St. Michael, Alaska	Dusty Diamond Corp. (of Chicago, Illinois)	101	75 feet	Built by the Dusty Diamond Corp., but sold to the Klondike Promotion Co. (also of Chicago) in 1898. At Fish River, Alaska during the winter of 1898–1899. Sold to Capt. James A. "Andy" Pate, H. A. Green, and H. S. Chelton in 1899. Resold to De Soto Placer Mining Co. in 1903. Resold to Edward B. Barthrop in 1904. Owned by Edward J. Hackett by 1912. Wrecked in the Upper Tanana River in 1914 or 1915.
Edith M. Kyle	U.S.A. #136676	1898	San Francisco, California		54	62 feet	Originally owned by a company from Boston, Massachusetts, led by George Kyle. At Arctic City, Alaska on the Koyukuk River during the winter of 1898–1899. Sold to Frank L. Pickart, Gordon C. Bettles, and Charles A. Pickart in 1900. Broken up in 1901.
Edna	None	by 1911					Not known whether stern wheel or screw propeller propulsion. Operated on the Lower Yukon River. Owned by Robert H. Griffis and James H. Haley. Disposed of after 1911.
Eldorado (Philip B. Low, 1898–1899)	U.S.A. #150776 (1898–1899); Canada #107852 (1899–1903)	1898	Seattle, Washington	Puget Sound Bridge & Dredging Co.	466	140 feet	Originally owned by Boston & Alaska Transportation Co. Acquired the nickname "Fillup Below" because it sank several times. Sold to Yukon Flyer Line in 1899. Sold to Capt. Ernest C. Miller in 1901. Broken up at Dawson City, Yukon in 1903.: Boat named for Eldorado Creek, the primary tributary of Bonanza Creek, the latter creek being where the owner of the Yukon Flyer Line, Nels Peterson, made his fortune.
Ella	U.S.A. #202300	1905	Seattle, Washington	Henry Bratnober	419	120 feet	Originally owned by the Tanana Trading Co. Sold to the North American Transportation & Trading Co. in 1906. Foundered after striking an object at Tolovana, Alaska in 1909.: Named for Ella Bratnober (1856–1947), wife of Henry.
Emily M	U.S.A. #136667	1898	Brownsville, Oregon		12	32 feet	At Koyukuk River, Alaska during winter of 1898–1899. Sold to H. B. Meyer in 1899. Last inspected in 1901. Registry closed in 1903.
Emma	Canada #107260	1898	New Westminster, British Columbia	W. M. Gifford	82	54 feet	Originally owned by William J. Rant. Machinery removed from boat in 1899. Sold to John H. Tulley in 1903. Resold to Arthur J. Simonds in 1904. Resold back to Rant by 1907. Wrecked and abandoned. Registry closed in 1920.
Emma Nott	Canada #107256	1898	Bennett, British Columbia	Robert J. "Joe" Nott	48	56 feet	Originally owned by "Joe" Nott. Sold to Arthur J. Simonds in 1903. Broken up in 1908.: Boat named for Emma Nott Litster (1892–1951), daughter of "Joe."
Englewood	U.S.A. #136716	1898	St. Michael, Alaska		26	51 feet	Registry closed in 1903 or 1904.
Evelyn	U.S.A. #205767	1908	St. Michael, Alaska	Henry Bratnober	352	122 feet	Originally owned by Upper Tanana Trading & Transportation Co. Sold to Northern Navigation Co. by 1912. Wrecked in 1913. Later in 1913, superstructure used to make the Norcom.
Explorer	U.S.A. #136583	1885	Mare Island, California	U.S. Navy	16	50 feet	Originally owned by U.S. Navy. On Lt. George M. Stoney expedition in 1885 and 1886. Sold to Charles Peterson in 1886. Sold to the Catholic Church (Russian Mission) between 1886 & 1888. Awarded its official number (136583) as a commercial vessel in 1895. Sold to Northern Commercial Co. between 1901 & 1906. Foundered at Russian Mission, Alaska in 1906.
F. H. Kilbourne	Canada #107516	1898	San Francisco, California (hull); Bennett, British Columbia (superstructure)	Risdon Iron Works (hull); James H. Calvert (superstructure)	87	50 feet	Originally owned by Upper Yukon Co. Sold to Henry Alexander Munn in 1899. Retired in 1900. Abandoned in 1901. Remains scrapped in 1999.: Named for Frank H. Kilbourne (1857–1928), Seattle, Washington businessman.
Flora	Canada #103916	1898	Wheaton River, Yukon	Bennett Lake & Klondyke Navigation Co.	63	95 feet (80 feet, 1898–1900)	Originally owned by BL&KN Co. Transferred to the Klondyke Corp. in 1900. Converted to a barge and sold to Five Finger Coal Co. in 1902. Sold to Fortymile Dredging Co. in 1903. Wrecked by ice at Forty Mile, Yukon in 1905.: Named for Florence E. Nunn Rattenbury (1870–1929, m. 1898, div. 1925), 1st wife of architect Francis M. Rattenbury, a major investor in the BL&KN Co.
Florence	U.S.A.#121068	1898	San Francisco, California		90	101 feet	Originally owned by Alaska Commercial Co. At Koyukuk River, Alaska during winter of 1898–1899. Transferred to the Northern Navigation Co. in 1901. Crushed by ice in the St. Michael Canal in 1909.: Named for Florence Isabelle "Bella" Fleishhacker, née Gerstle (1875–1963), daughter of AC Co. president, Lewis Gerstle.
Florence S	U.S.A.#121085 (1898–1900, 1904–1914, & 1938–1952); Canada #107857 (1900–1904); out of documentation (1914–1938)	1898	St. Michael, Alaska	Moran Bros. (hull #6)	100	75 feet	Originally owned by Seattle-Yukon Transportation Co. Sold to Hoey V. V. Bean in 1899. Sold to Capt. Sydney C. Barrington in 1900. Sold in 1904, probably to William A. Hensley. Left to Hensley's ex-wife, Kittie M. Hensley, by 1907. Wrecked by ice in the Upper Tanana River in the spring of 1914. Superstructure salvaged to make additions to the Hensley residence at Fairbanks, Alaska in 1914. Ms. Hensley died in 1931. Hensley residence moved to Pioneer Park at Fairbanks in 1967. Hull out of documentation, 1914 to 1938. Hull owned by George S. Black and rebuilt into a barge in 1938. Foundered on the Yukon River near Galena, Alaska, in 1952.: Boat most likely named for Florence S. Starkey (1854–1936), wife of Harry H. Starkey, both investors in the S-YT Co.
Flying	None	by 1917					Operated on the Upper Yukon River. Owned by Tantalus Coal.
Fortune Hunter	......	......	......	......	......	......	See, Helen Bruce.
Fulton	U.S.A. #121086	1898	St. Michael, Alaska		66	65 feet	At Bergman, Alaska on the Koyukuk River during the winter of 1898–1899. Abandoned in 1902.
General Stewart Van Vliet	......	......	......	......	......	......	See, 1st Rampart.
Glengarry	......	......	......	......	......	......	See, Atlinto.
Glenora	U.S.A. #86413 (1898–1901); Canada #107149 (1901–1902)	1898	Tacoma, Washington	George W. Barlow	360	126 feet	Originally owned the Tacoma-Port Orchard Navigation Co. Sold to R. P. McLennan in 1901. Demolished by fire (arson) near Dawson City, Yukon in 1902.
Gold Star	U.S.A. #86440 (1898–1900 & 1902–1906); Canada #107856 (1900–1902)	1898	St. Michael, Alaska		168	94 feet	Originally owned by Gold Star Transportation Co. Sold to Thomas C. Nixon and William Mogridge in 1900. Sold to the Klondyke Corp. and converted to a barge in 1902. Klondyke Corp. liquidated in 1904. Gold Star wrecked at Tanana, Alaska in 1906.
Golden Hind	None	1904					Operated on Chena River. Owned by Wilson and Frank H. Stackpole. Wrecked at Fairbanks, Alaska in 1904.
Hamburg	U.S.A. #96468	1899	St. Michael, Alaska		24	32 feet	Lost in 1899.
Helen Bruce (Fortune Hunter, 1898–1904)	U.S.A. #201461	1898	St. Michael, Alaska	Klondike Promotion Co. (of Chicago, Illinois)	83	62 feet	Originally owned by KP Co. (of Chicago). Sold to Minor W. Bruce in 1900. Last inspected in 1904. Registry closed in 1909 or 1910.: Named for Helen Potter, née Bruce (1898–1988), daughter of Minor W. Bruce.
Idler	U.S.A. #209222	1911	Fairbanks, Alaska	Fred G. Noyes	98	64 feet	Chain driven stern wheel. Originally owned by Fred G. Noyes. Sold to George S. Black, converted to Diesel power, and reduced to 71 gross tons in 1935. To George S. Black Estate in 1953. Abandoned in 1956.
Illinois	U.S.A. #100663	1898	St. Michael, Alaska	Galesburg-Alaska Mining & Developing Co.	105	75 feet	Originally owned by the GAM&D Co. At Alatna River, Alaska during the winter of 1898–1899. Sold to the Alaska Commercial Co. in 1899. Converted to a barge in 1900. Transferred to the Northern Navigation Co. in 1901. Transferred to the White Pass in 1914. Not used under White Pass ownership. Abandoned at St. Michael in 1927.
Independence	U.S.A. #100668	1898	St. Michael, Alaska	A. H. Logan	148	80 feet	Originally owned by Logan. Sold to Independent Mining Co. in 1899. Sold to Tanana Trading Co. and converted to a wrecking barge in 1905. Resold to North American Transportation & Trading Co. in 1906. Transferred to the Merchants' Yukon Transportation Co. in 1910. Sold to Northern Navigation Co. in 1911. Sold to White Pass in 1914. Not used under White Pass ownership. Abandoned in 1917.
Indianapolis	U.S.A. #100667	1898	St. Michael, Alaska		96	70 feet	Owned by a company of Indiana men. Last inspected in 1899. Registry closed in 1900 or 1901.
Iowa	None	1898	Carcross, Yukon	Iowa-Alaska Mining Co.		60 feet	Owned by the Iowa-Alaska Mining Co. At Koyukuk River, Alaska during winter of 1898–1899. Retired in 1900.
J. B. Kerr	None	1898	St. Michael, Alaska		25		Operated on the Lower Yukon River. Last inspected in 1900. Listed in Jones (1904).
James Deitrick	U.S.A. #77315	1898	Elizabeth, New Jersey	Crescent Shipyard (hull #65)	25	50 feet	Owned by James Deitrick (1864–1935). At Peavey, Alaska on the Koyukuk River during the winter of 1898–1899. Registry closed in 1903.
James Domville	Canada #107154	1898	North Vancouver, British Columbia	Alfred Wallace	486	122 feet	Originally owned by James Domville. Sold to the Klondike, Yukon & Stewart River Co. in 1898. Wrecked in the "Thirtymile" section of the Yukon River in 1899.
Jennie M	U.S.A. #77320	1898	St. Michael, Alaska	Crescent Shipyard (hull #58)	49	70 feet	Originally owned by the Philadelphia Exploration & Mining Co. At Alatna River, Alaska during the winter of 1898–1899. Owned by Hendricks & Belt in 1903. Sold to Black Transportation Co. and converted to a barge in 1904. Broken up in 1905.: Named for Jennie M. Hill (1860–1950), wife of PE&M Co. leader, Thomas R. Hill.
Kalamazoo	None	1898	Bennett, British Columbia	Kalamazoo Mining & Prospecting Co.			Operated on Upper Yukon River. Owned by KM&P Co. Foundered at Casey's Rock, Thirtymile in 1898.
Katie Hemrich	......	......	......	......	......	......	See, 1st Rampart.
Kluhane	Canada #126942	1909	Victoria, British Columbia	Victoria Machinery Depot (hull #12)	19	55 feet	Owned by Taylor & Drury, Ltd. Retired in 1920.: Kluhane was derived from the hybrid phrase łù aani, consisting of the Southern Tutchone word for whitefish, plus the Tlingit word for place in which there are.
1st Koyukuk	U.S.A. #161202	1902	Portland, Oregon	Joseph Supple	286	121 feet	Owned by Northern Navigation Co. Stranded at Little Delta, Alaska, on the Upper Tanana River in 1906.: Koyukuk was derived from the Yup'ik phrase kuik-yuk, meaning a generic river. The Koyukuk River was given its generic Yup'ik name by explorer Petr Vasil'evich "Vasilii" Malakhov, because he did not know the local Koyukon name. Local Koyukon name was Yunnaka.
2nd Koyukuk	U.S.A. #203496	1906	St. Michael, Alaska	Northern Navigation Co.	248	121 feet	Owned by Northern Navigation. Foundered in the Upper Tanana River in 1911.: Koyukuk was derived from the Yup'ik phrase kuik-yuk, meaning a generic river. The Koyukuk River was given its generic Yup'ik name by explorer Petr Vasil'evich "Vasilii" Malakhov, because he did not know the local Koyukon name. Local Koyukon name was Yunnaka.
Lala Lee Collins	None	1898	Seattle, Washington		7		Operated on the Lower Yukon River. Sold to Dave Cohn and S. M. Hirsch in 1899. Last inspected in 1900. Listed in Jones (1904).
Leah	U.S.A. #141556	1898	St. Michael, Alaska	Alaska Commercial Co.	477	139 feet	Originally owned by the Alaska Commercial Co. Transferred to Northern Navigation Co. in 1901. Foundered 40 miles below Kaltag, Alaska in 1906.: Named for Leah Shingleberger (1826–1900), mother-in-law of AC Co. vice president Capt. Gustave F. Niebaum.
Leota	U.S.A. #141541	1898	Alameda, California	Daniel G. McKenzie	37	51 feet	Originally owned by Alameda & Alaska Mining & Trading Co. At Koyukuk River, Alaska during winter of 1898–1899. Sold to G. W. Chase in 1899. Purchased by Northern Navigation Co. in 1906 or 1907. Sold to Horton & Moore Co. in 1911 or 1912. Stranded near Fairbanks, Alaska in 1920.
Lieut. Smith (Argo, 1898–1903 or 1904)	U.S.A. #107357	1898	Stockton, California	Jarvis & Son	44	60 feet	Originally owned by Cleveland-Alaska Gold Mining & Milling Co. At Alatna River, Alaska during the winter of 1898–1899. Sold to the U.S. Army in 1899. Resold in 1905.: Named for 1st Lt. William H. Smith (1860–1898), killed at the Battle of San Juan Hill.
Linderman	Canada #107519	1898	Bennett, British Columbia	Carroll Johnson & Co.	54	40 feet	Operated on Bennett Lake. Originally owned by Capt. John Irving. Sold to the Northern Lakes & Rivers Navigation Co. in 1899. Later in 1899, it foundered in Whitehorse Rapids.: Lindeman Lake named for Dr. Moritz K. A. Lindeman (1823–1908), secretary to the Bremen Geographical Society.
Little Delta	U.S.A. #208038	1905	Fairbanks, Alaska		71	67 feet	Owned by Cyrus B. Atwell. Laid up at Iditarod, Alaska. Registry closed in 1926 or 1927.: Named for the river deltas formed in the Tanana River, downstream from the mouth of the Little Delta River. The name Little Delta River contains the word Little to differentiate the river from nearby Big Delta River.
Little Snug	U.S.A. #208263	1910	Fairbanks, Alaska		50	59 feet	Owned by Amos J. Tucker. Registry closed in 1919 or 1920.
Lizzie B	None	1898	New York, New York		4		Operated on the Lower Yukon River. Last inspected in 1900. Listed in Jones (1904).
Lois	U.S.A. #208826	1910	Fairbanks, Alaska		49	58 feet	Registry closed in 1914 or 1915.
Loreli	U.S.A. #141598 (1896–1899); Canada #107940 (1899–1920)	1896	Portland, Oregon		32	50 feet	Rebuilt by Joseph Supple for Daly & Co. (Skagway, Alaska) in 1898. Sold to George Findlay in 1900. Resold to Edward W. G. "Ted" Tennant in 1901. Resold to John Leech in 1902. Registry closed in 1920.
Lorenda	U.S.A. #141568	1898	St. Michael, Alaska		49	50 feet	Abandoned in 1898.
Los Angeles	U.S.A. #141569	1898	St. Michael, Alaska		29	48 feet	At Bergman, Alaska on the Koyukuk River during the winter of 1898–1899. Last inspected in 1903. Listed in Jones (1904). Registry closed in 1908 or 1909.
Lotta Talbot	U.S.A. #141551	1898	Seattle, Washington	Richard A. Talbot	342	146 feet	Originally owned by British-American Steamship Co. (Frank Waterhouse, Ltd.). Sold to the Alaska Meat Co. in 1899. Alaska Meat became Pacific Cold Storage Co. in 1900. Boat sold to Waechter Bros. in 1905 or 1906. Demolished by fire at Fairbanks, Alaska in 1906.: Named for Lotta Talbot (1889–1971), daughter of Richard A.
Luella	U.S.A. #141540	1898	Stockton, California	Jarvis & Son	115	65 feet	Originally owned by a company from Chicago, Illinois, headed by C. M. Hamilton. At Bergman, Alaska on the Koyukuk River during the winter of 1898–1899. Sold to the Alaska Commercial Co. in 1900. Transferred to Northern Navigation Co. in 1901. Stranded near Chena, Alaska in 1910.
Lully C	......	......	......	......	......	......	See, Alameda.
Mabel C	U.S.A. #92984	1898	St. Michael, Alaska		74	58 feet	Purchased by U.S. Army in 1900. Disposed of in 1902 or 1903.
Marathon	None	1909	Fairbanks, Alaska				Side wheels. Broken up in 1909.
Marie F	None	by 1913					Side wheels. Operated on the Lower Yukon River. Owned by Capt. George C. "Charles" Finger.: Named for Mary R. Finger (1865–1945), wife of "Charles."
Marjorie	Canada #107248	1898	New Westminster, British Columbia	Oliver Bigney	20	37 feet	Originally owned by Teslin Transportation Co. Sold to Henry C. Lisle by 1907. Abandoned in 1914.
Martha Clow	U.S.A. #92859	1898	Stockton, California	Jarvis & Son	98 (52, 1898–1908)	81 feet (65 feet, 1898–1908)	Originally owned by the Charles R. Clow Expedition, from Chicago, Illinois. At Koyukuk River, Alaska during winter of 1898–1899. Mr. Clow left Alaska in 1900. Boat sold to Mr. Willett in 1905. Sold to Capt. George C. "Charles" Finger in 1907 or 1908. Sold to George Mutchler between 1917 & 1922. Abandoned in 1925 or 1926.: Named for Martha M. Douglas, née Clow (1894–1990), niece of Charles R. Clow.
May D	U.S.A. #92853	1898	San Francisco, California		67	62 feet	Originally owned by Alaska Exploration Co. Transferred to Northern Navigation Co. in 1901. Sold to M. E. Dawson in 1902. Sold to Henry M. H. Bolander between 1910 & 1912. Abandoned in 1925 or 1926.
Messenger	None	1898	St. Michael, Alaska		9		Owned by the Yukon Gold Dredge Co. Last inspected in 1898. At Soo City, Alaska, on the South Fork of the Koyukuk River during the winter of 1898–1899.
Michigan	None	1898	Bennett, British Columbia			24 feet	Not known whether stern wheel or screw propeller propulsion.
Milwaukee	U.S.A. #92865	1898	Ballard, Washington	Milwaukee-Alaska Gold-Dredge Mining Co.	396	136 feet	Originally owned by the Milwaukee-Alaska Gold-Dredge Mining Co. Sold to the British-American Steamship Co. (Frank Waterhouse, Ltd.) in 1899. Resold to the Seattle-Yukon Transportation Co. in 1900. Transferred to Northern Navigation Co. in 1901. Sold between 1908 & 1912. Abandoned in 1924 or 1925.
Monarch (informally known as "Clara Monarch" after 1900)	Canada #107863	1898	San Francisco, California	Matthew Turner	284	120 feet	Originally owned by Fernand de Journal. Engines from the Clara (U.S.A. #127249) installed in 1900. Sold to Dominic Burns in 1902. Resold to George S. Wilkins in 1903. Foundered at Whitehorse, Yukon in 1904. (Not to be confused with Monarch, U.S.A. #92855, owned by White Pass: see above.)
Mono	Canada #107102	1898	Stikine River, British Columbia	Frank P. Armstrong and A. E. Henderson	278	120 feet	Owned by Teslin Transportation Co. Demolished by fire (arson) near Dawson City, Yukon in 1902.
Nabesna	U.S.A. #222522	1922	Fairbanks, Alaska		73	65 feet	Owned by Clarence D. Flanagan. Abandoned in 1929 or 1930.: Nabesna was derived from the Ahtna phrase nabaes na’, which means a-type-of-stone river.
Nenana	U.S.A. #223315	1922	Nenana, Alaska		8	40 feet	Originally owned by Charles W. Smith. Sold to John H. Bailey in 1925 or 1926. Abandoned in 1937 or 1938.: Nenana was derived from the Lower Tanana phrase nen’ a no’, which means stopping-while-migrating river. Looks like a contraction or an idiom, because it literally appears to mean something less, such as land by the river.
New Racket	U.S.A. #130228	1882	San Francisco, California	Edward L. Schieffelin	20	42 feet	Originally owned by Schieffelin. Sold to Arthur Harper, Capt. Alfred H. Mayo, and LeRoy N. "Jack" McQuesten in 1883. Sold to the Alaska Commercial Co. in 1894. Retired in 1895. Wrecked by ice on the Koyukuk River in 1897.
Niagara	Canada #107158	1898	Vancouver, British Columbia		39	40 feet	Owned by John F. "Jack" Walker. At Koyukuk River, Alaska during winter of 1898–1899. Broken up in 1899.
Nora	Canada #103915	1898	Wheaton River, Yukon	Bennett Lake & Klondyke Navigation Co.	67	80 feet	Originally owned by the BL&KN Co. Transferred to the Klondyke Corp. in 1900. Broken up in 1902.: Named for Florence E. Nunn Rattenbury (1870–1929, m. 1898, div. 1925), 1st wife of architect Francis M. Rattenbury, a major investor in the BL&KN Co.
North Star	U.S.A. #130770	1898	San Francisco, California		28	46 feet	Owned by North Star Mining Co. At Alatna River, Alaska during the winter of 1898–1899. Abandoned on the Koyukuk River in 1904 or 1905.
1st Northern Light	U.S.A. #130789	1896	St. Michael, Alaska		10	40 feet	Built by Union Iron Works for the Episcopal Church. Foundered in the Koyukuk River in 1904.
2nd Northern Light	U.S.A. #212575	1914	Tanana, Alaska		12	41 feet	Registry closed in 1919 or 1920.
Nugget	None	1898	Bergman, Alaska		5		Operated on the Lower Yukon River. Foundered at Nome, Alaska in 1899.
Nunivak	U.S.A. #200528	1898	San Francisco, California	Union Iron Works	486	180 feet	Originally owned by U.S. Revenue Cutter Service. Sold to W. D. Hofius & Co. (dealer) in 1902. Sold to the North American Transportation & Trading Co. in 1905. Crushed by ice at Nenana, Alaska in 1909.: Nunivak was derived from a Yup'ik phrase, which may mean big land.
Olive May	Canada #107514	1897	Bennett, British Columbia	Albert S. Kerry	54	60 feet	Originally owned by Kerry. Sold to Bennett Lake & Klondyke Navigation Co. in 1899. BL&KN Co. intended to rename it Dora, but it remained Olive May. Transferred to Klondyke Corp. in 1900. Resold to Nathaniel B. Raymond in 1901. Resold to L. Roy by 1904. Firebox used by Dr. Leonard S. E. Sugden in 1900 to cremate the remains of Cornelius Curtin (1855–1900) at Tagish, Yukon. This event was conflated into the poem The Cremation of Sam McGee by Robert W. Service in 1907. The poem renamed Mr. Curtin to "Sam McGee," renamed the Olive May to "Alice May," and relocated the event to "Lake LeBarge". Olive May broken up in 1908.: Named for Olive May Kerry (1891–1970), daughter of Albert S.
Ora	Canada #103914	1898	Wheaton River, Yukon	Bennett Lake & Klondyke Navigation Co.	69	95 feet (80 feet, 1898–1900)	Originally owned by the BL&KN Co. Transferred to the Klondyke Corp. in 1900. Converted to a barge and sold to Five Finger Coal Co. in 1902. Sold to Fortymile Dredging Co. in 1903. Wrecked by ice at Forty Mile, Yukon in 1905.: Named for Florence E. Nunn Rattenbury (1870–1929, m. 1898, div. 1925), 1st wife of architect Francis M. Rattenbury, a major investor in the BL&KN Co.
Pauline	Canada #116611	1907	Whitehorse, Yukon	Nathaniel B. Raymond	145	86 feet	Originally owned by Stewart River Navigation Co. Sold to the Side Streams Navigation Co. in 1909. Wrecked by ice at Dawson City, Yukon in 1915.: Named for Pauline E. Dow, née Raymond (1898–1978), daughter of Nathaniel.
Pelly	None						Operated on the Yukon River about 1895, as far upstream (south) as the mouth of the Pelly River.
Philip B. Low	......	......	......	......	......	......	See, Eldorado.
Pioneer	U.S.A. #222523	1922	Fairbanks, Alaska		14	41 feet	Owned by George S. Black. Abandoned in 1930 or 1931.
Potlach	U.S.A. #150793	1898	Racine, Wisconsin		18	35 feet	Owned by Frederick J. Currier. Stranded off the Chena River in 1900. A potlach is a festival ceremony practiced by indigenous peoples of the Pacific Northwest Coast.
Pup	U.S.A. #201964	1905	Ballard, Washington	Chindern [?]	33	54 feet	Owned by Capt. Wallace Langley and John E. Green by 1907. Sold to William P. McKeague, Harvey Watson, and Roy Henderson in 1913. Abandoned in 1935 or 1936.: Pup is a term that was current during the Klondike Gold Rush. A pup is a small second order stream (one which is formed by the confluence of two first order streams), and which is also a tributary to yet another stream. Usually, they flow down gulches on the sides of a valley, into the creek at the bottom of the valley.
Quick	Canada #107861	1900	Dawson City, Yukon	Edward J. Smythe	67	60 feet	Originally owned by the Stewart River Navigation Co. Sold to Thomas Smith in 1905. Resold to Capt. A. F. Daughtry and George Waltenberg in 1908. Registry closed in 1914.
Quickstep	U.S.A. #20617	1898	Seattle, Washington		343	124 feet	Sold to Adelbert E. Claflin in 1899. Sold to John S. Segers in 1903. Sold to the Kuskokwim Commercial Co. in 1905. Sold to the Alaska Rivers Navigation Co. in 1918. Abandoned in 1938 at McGrath.
1st Rampart (Katie Hemrich, 1898–1900; General Stewart Van Vliet, 1900–1905)	U.S.A. #161108	1898	Seattle, Washington	C. N. Patterson	248	121 feet	Originally owned by the Yukon Gold Dredge Co. At Seaforth, Alaska, on the South Fork of the Koyukuk River during the winter of 1898–1899. Sold to U.S. Army in 1900. Resold to the Northern Navigation Co. in 1905. Converted to Barge Van Vliet in 1906. Disposed of by 1913.: Originally named for Katherine A. "Katie" Scruby, née Hemrich (1891–1969), daughter of Seattle brewer Andrew Hemrich. Boat later renamed for the 20-mile canyon, located 7 to 27 miles northeast (upstream) of Tanana, through which the Yukon River flows.
2nd Rampart	Canada #116615	1914	Dawson City, Yukon	Alphonse Geoffrey	5	43 feet	Owned by Daniel Cadzow. Registry closed in 1936.: Name describes the 20-mile canyon, located 7 to 27 miles northeast (upstream) of Tanana, through which the Yukon River flows.
Redlands	U.S.A. #111178	1898	San Francisco, California		14	50 feet	Originally owned by Redlands-Alaska Mining Co. For sale in 1899. Listed in Jones (1904). Registry closed in 1913 or 1914.
Reindeer	Canada #107099	1898	Victoria, British Columbia	Thomas H. Trahey	358	121 feet	Originally owned by the Yukon & Hootalinqua Navigation Co. At Dall River, Alaska during winter of 1898–1899. Sold to British-America Corp. in 1899. Demolished by fire at Five Finger Rapids, Yukon in 1900.
Research	U.S.A. #202298	1898	Liverpool, United Kingdom		45	60 feet	Originally owned by Klondyke Research Syndicate (of England). At Red Mountain Creek on the Koyukuk River during the winter of 1898–1899. Sold to Capt. Walter H. Ferguson in 1900. Owned by Edward C. Loomis in 1905. Sold to Louis L. Lane in 1911. Foundered at the Nixon-Takotna Fork, Alaska in 1911.
Robert Kerr	U.S.A. #111180	1898	Seattle, Washington	Moran Bros. (hull #32)	718	176 feet	Originally owned by the British-American Steamship Co. (Frank Waterhouse, Ltd.). Sold to the Alaska Meat Co. in 1899. Alaska Meat became Pacific Cold Storage Co. in 1900. Boat resold to Waechter Bros. in 1919. Abandoned in 1934 or 1935.: May have been named for the former barque Robert Kerr (1866), which had become famous as a refuge from the Great Vancouver Fire of 1886, and which was reduced to a barge two years later.
Rock Island	U.S.A. #111177	1898	Seattle, Washington	Kahlke Bros.	533	134 feet	Originally owned by Rock Island Alaska Mining Co. Sold to the Seattle-Yukon Transportation Co. in 1899. Transferred to Northern Navigation Co. in 1901. Cut by ice at Chena, Alaska in 1906.: Named after the Rock Island Alaska Mining Co.
Rock Island No. 2	U.S.A. #111187	1898	Seattle, Washington	Kahlke Bros.	333	100 feet	Originally owned by Rock Island Alaska Mining Co. Sold to the Seattle-Yukon Transportation Co. and converted to a barge in 1899. Transferred to Northern Navigation Co. in 1901. Sold to the White Pass in 1914. Wrecked by ice at Nenana, Alaska in 1918.: Named after the Rock Island Alaska Mining Co.
Ruth	Canada #107518	1898	Bennett, British Columbia	James H. Calvert	52	50 feet	Originally owned by Capt. John Irving. Sold to the Northern Lakes & Rivers Navigation Co. in 1899. Resold to the Atlin Transportation Co. in 1900. Demolished by fire on Atlin Lake in 1902.
St. James	U.S.A. #116857	1898	St. Michael, Alaska		63	70 feet	Crew was from St. James, Minnesota. At the Hogatza River, Alaska during the winter of 1898–1899. Foundered at Anvik, Alaska in 1899.
St. Joseph	U.S.A. #116863	1898	St. Michael, Alaska		69	96 feet	Originally owned by the Catholic Church (Holy Cross Mission). Sold to Ira F. Wood in 1929 or 1930. Abandoned in 1943.
St. Michael	U.S.A. #115674	1879	San Francisco, California		28	49 feet	Originally owned by Western Fur & Trading Co. WF&T Co. sold out to the Alaska Commercial Co. in 1883. Boat sold to the Catholic Church (Holy Cross Mission) in 1884. Resold to Elbridge T. "E.T." Barnette, et al. in 1897. Resold to Capt. W. H. Geiger in 1898. At Dall River, Alaska during winter of 1898–1899. Laid up in 1920.: Village of St. Michael, Alaska named for Vice Admiral Mikhail D. Tebenkov (1802–1872), governor of Russian America.
Samson	U.S.A. #208262	1910	Fairbanks, Alaska	Raymond Brumbaugh, Henry C. Hamilton & Edward E. Kellogg	272	85 feet	Owned by Lemuel J. "Joe" Heacock. Wrecked in the Upper Tanana River in 1916.
Seattle No. 1	U.S.A. #116853	1897	St. Michael, Alaska	Moran Bros. (hull No. 4)	445	148 feet	Originally owned by Seattle-Yukon Transportation Co. Converted to a barge in 1900. Transferred to Northern Navigation Co. in 1901. Sold to the White Pass in 1918. Later in 1918, it was wrecked by ice at St. Marys, Alaska.
Selma	U.S.A. #217327	1918	Ruby, Alaska		27	48 feet	Owned by Edward D. Simon. Abandoned in 1932 or 1933.: Named for Selma J. Simon (1860–1927), wife of Edward D.
Sen. W. B. Allison	U.S.A. #116858	1898	St. Michael, Alaska		10	50 feet	At Koyukuk River, Alaska during winter of 1898–1899. Registry closed in 1902 or 1903.
Shamrock	None						Originally, steam power. Obtained by Klondike Airways about 1929. Subsequently, converted to gasoline power-stern wheel. Retired in 1938.
Shusana	U.S.A. #211609	1913	Fairbanks, Alaska		49	80 feet	Originally owned by Edward J. Hackett. Sold to the Alaska Rivers Navigation Co. in 1914. Stranded near Nenana, Alaska in 1920.: Shusana was derived from the Ahtna phrase tsetsaan’ na’, which means copper creek. Not a reference to the Copper River.
Silver Wave	U.S.A. #116749	1896	Moline, Illinois		7	38 feet	Sold to the Galesburg-Alaska Mining & Development Co. and shipped from Illinois in 1898. At Holy Cross, Alaska during the winter of 1898–1899. Abandoned in 1899.
Sovereign	U.S.A. #116813	1898	Ballard, Washington	Thomas C. Reed	326	126 feet	Owned by the Columbia Navigation Co. At Koyukuk River, Alaska during winter of 1898–1899. Wrecked at Nome, Alaska in 1904.
Starkey	......	1898	St. Michael, Alaska	Moran Bros. (hull #7)	93	60 feet	Owned by the Seattle-Yukon Transportation Co. Sank when launched.: Named for Harry H. Starkey (1857–1902), an investor in the SYT Co.
Sunflower	U.S.A. #116848	1898	St. Michael, Alaska		57	60 feet	Owned by a company headed by a Mr. Donohue. At Alatna River, Alaska during the winter of 1898–1899. For sale in 1899. Foundered on the Snake River in 1900.
T. J. Nestor	U.S.A. #145792	1898	St. Michael, Alaska	Thomas J. Nestor	95	72 feet	Last inspected in 1899. Registry closed in 1899 or 1900.: Named for Thomas J. Nestor (1862–1943).
Tana	U.S.A. #201820	1905	Seattle, Washington		234	106 feet	Originally, gasoline power-stern wheel and owned by Capt. Wallace Langley. Converted to steam power in 1906. Sold to Alaska Rivers Navigation Co. in 1933. Abandoned in 1940 at McGrath.: Tana was derived from an Ahtna phrase, which means "bagged-object-is-in-position" river. Most likely, a contraction or an idiom.
Tanana Chief	U.S.A. #145795	1898	Unalaska, Alaska	Theodore L. Morgan et al.	72	59 feet	Built by Morgan et al. (of St. Paul, Minnesota) for their own use. Sold to Hendricks & Belt in 1899. Stranded on Kantishna River in 1906.: Tanana derived from a Lower Tanana phrase, which is not the name of the Tanana River, but is the name of the village. Means river trail.
Teddy H	U.S.A. #208307	1910	Fairbanks, Alaska	Lemuel J. "Joe" Heacock	153	74 feet	Originally owned by Heacock. Heacock died in 1919. Boat sold to Sam Dubin by 1920. Foundered near Nenana, Alaska in 1930.: Named for Edwin C. Heacock (1861–1927), brother of "Joe."
Tetlin	U.S.A. #208036	1908	Fairbanks, Alaska		65	61 feet	Owned by Theadore Kettleson. Wrecked, 10 miles above the mouth of the Nabesna River in 1923.: Tetlin was derived from the Upper Tanana term tezdlende, which means current flows.
Thomas Dwyer	U.S.A. #145407	1885	Sacramento, California	John W. Rock	73	87 feet	Originally owned by the Sacramento Transportation Co. Sold to California & Alaska Navigation & Commercial Co. in 1897. Sold to W. J. McDowell in 1899. Registry closed in 1916 or 1917.: Named for Capt. Thomas Dwyer (1835–1890).
Tosi	None	about 1924			50		Operated on Lower Yukon River. Owned by the Catholic Church (Holy Cross Mission).: Named for Father Pascal Tosi (1837–1898).
Unity	None	1898	Seattle, Washington		10		Not known whether stern wheel or screw propeller propulsion. At Koyukuk River, Alaska during the winter of 1898–1899. Last inspected in 1899.
Victoria	U.S.A. #161820	1897	St. Michael, Alaska	Matthew Turner	55	75 feet	Originally owned by Alaska Commercial Co. Transferred to Northern Navigation Co. in 1901. Sold to George A. Fredericks in 1908 or 1909. Abandoned at St. Michael, Alaska in 1924 or 1925.
Victorian	Canada #107520	1898	Bennett, British Columbia	James H. Calvert	50	56 feet	Originally owned by Capt. John Irving. Sold to the Northern Lakes & Rivers Navigation Co. in 1899. Later in 1899, it was broken up at Bennett Lake.
Viola	None	1898	Bennett, British Columbia		4	30 feet	Operated on the Upper Yukon River.
Vivian	Canada #107251	1898	Bennett, British Columbia	James H. Calvert	52	50 feet	Originally owned by Capt. John Irving. Sold to the Northern Lakes & Rivers Navigation Co. in 1899. Later in 1899, it was wrecked at Dawson City, Yukon.
W. H. Evans	U.S.A. #81599	1898	Ballard, Washington		729	183 feet	Owned by the Lewis-Klondike Expedition Co. (of Baltimore, Maryland). At Dall River, Alaska during winter of 1898–1899. Broken up at Yukon Flats, Alaska in 1900.: Named for William H. Evans, investor in the LKE Co.
W. K. Merwin	U.S.A. #80959	1883	Seattle, Washington	Capt. Willard K. Merwin	229	108 feet	Originally owned by Capt. Merwin. Sold to the Washington Steamboat Co. in 1886. Resold to the Alaska Commercial Co. in 1897. Foundered near Nome, Alaska in 1899.: Named for Capt. Willard K. Merwin (1853–1932).
W. S. Stratton	U.S.A. #81623	1898	Seattle, Washington	James Casey	94	75 feet	Owned by Alec McDonald. Foundered near Selkirk, Yukon in 1899.: Named for Winfield S. Stratton (1848–1902), gold king of Cripple Creek, Colorado, who financed the boat.
W. Seig	None	by 1898					Not known whether stern wheel or screw propeller propulsion. At Koyukuk River, Alaska during winter of 1898–1899. Wrecked in a storm at St. Michael, Alaska in 1899.
Weona	U.S.A. #81624	1898	St. Michael, Alaska		27	40 feet	Last inspected in 1898. At Koyukuk River, Alaska during winter of 1898–1899. For sale in 1899. Registry closed in 1903 or 1904.: Weona is a Seneca term which means where only good prevails.
Wilder	None	1866	San Francisco, California			60 feet	Owned by Western Union Extension Co. In 1866 or 1867, it became the first powered vessel to operate on the Yukon River. Definitely operated on the Lower Yukon River in 1867.: Named for Samuel Wilder (1824–1902), a director of the Western Union Telegraph Co.
Willie Irving	Canada #103918	1898	Bennett, British Columbia	Joseph Supple	102	80 feet	Originally owned by John Irving. Sold to Ed McConnell, Capt. Edward M. Barrington, and C. H. Hamilton in 1898. Barrington died, and Willie Irving sold to Charles F. Griffith, N. Allen, N. Cowan, D. H. Dwyer, and C. H. Hamilton in 1899. Wrecked by ice near Selkirk, Yukon in 1899.: Named for William A. Irving (1886–1916, k.i.a. World War I), son of John Irving.
1st Yukon	U.S.A. #27623	1883	St. Michael, Alaska	Alaska Commercial Co.	21	70 feet	Owned by Alaska Commercial Co. At Bergman, Alaska on the Koyukuk River during the winter of 1898–1899. Wrecked by ice on the Koyukuk River in 1901.: For remarks relating to the name Yukon, see, Remarks for 2nd Yukon, U.S.A. #165172, under White Pass and Yukon Route, above.
Zodiac	None	1898	Seattle, Washington	James Carey	5	45 feet	Owned by James Carey. Operated on the Lower Yukon River, at least from 1904 to 1910.

Misc. Yukon River Steam Power – Screw Propeller Boats
Name	Registry (-ies)	Year built	Where Built	Builder	Volume (gross tons)	Hull Length	Remarks
Alaska	U.S.A. #107458	1899	Seattle, Washington	Moran Bros.	60	74 feet	Originally owned by Empire Transportation Co. Transferred to Northern Navigation Co. in 1901. Demolished by fire at Winter Quarters in 1906.: Alaska was derived from an Aleut idiom, which figuratively refers to the mainland of Alaska. Literally, it means object to which the action of the sea is directed.
Alert	Canada #107515	1898	Lindeman, British Columbia	G. Milne	9	34 feet	Operated on Lindeman Lake. Owned by John J. McKenna. Registry closed in 1919.
Alpha	U.S.A. #107404 (1898–1899); Canada #107924 (1899–1920)	1898	Seattle, Washington		10	38 feet	Originally owned by Arthur R. Auston. At the Hogatza River, Alaska during the winter of 1898–1899. Sold to Lewis McLachlan in 1902. Out of commission and registry closed in 1920.
Aquila	None	1889	Bristol, Rhode Island	Herreschoff Mfg. Co. (hull #157)		48 feet	Originally owned by William Randolph Hearst. Sold in 1895. Resold to Capt. Edward M. Barrington in February 1898. Operated on the Upper Yukon River in 1898. Bent its propeller at Forty Mile, Yukon in September 1898. Barrington died in 1899. Boat broken up in 1900.: Aquila is the Italian word for eagle.
Argonaut	U.S.A. #107403	1898	St. Michael, Alaska	Ildo Ransdell	15	50 feet	Originally owned by Alaska Exploration Co. At Koyukuk River, Alaska during winter of 1898–1899. Transferred to Northern Navigation Co. in 1901. Wrecked at Stewart, Yukon in 1912.
Blair of Athol	Canada #111608	1900	New Westminster, British Columbia	Joseph G. "Scottie" Morrison	11	54 feet	Operated on Atlin Lake. Originally owned by Morrison. Sold to Margaret Ward in 1902. Resold to the Northern Lumber Co. in 1904. Blown ashore in 1906.
Comet	None	1899	Shakan, Alaska		4		Eventually owned by Capt. Norron. Existed in 1902.
Concord	U.S.A. #127306	1898	St. Michael, Alaska		11	46 feet	Owned by Henry C. Lassen. May have been at Koyukuk River, Alaska during winter of 1898–1899. Registry closed in 1903 or 1904.
Cora	......	......	......	......	......	......	See, Koakuk.
Dawson City	......	......	......	......	......	......	See, Gussie Brown.
Eclipse	None	1898	St. Michael, Alaska	Gloucester Mining Co.	35	50 feet	Owned by the GM Co. At Union City, Alaska on the Koyukuk River during the winter of 1898–1899. Wrecked by ice at Nulato, Alaska in 1899.
El Sueno	U.S.A. #136625	1894	Alameda, California	Joseph A. Leonard	23	44 feet	Originally a sloop, owned by Joseph A. Leonard. Sold to El Sueño de Oro Mining & Transportation Co. (of San Francisco, California) in 1897. Converted to a steam power-screw propeller in 1898. At Dall River, Alaska during winter of 1898–1899. Sold to Victor W. Kloppenberg & Lord in 1899. Foundered off Nome, Alaska, in 1903.: Sueño is the Spanish word for dream. El sueño de oro means the dream of gold.
Empire	U.S.A. #136674	1898	Elizabeth, New Jersey	Crescent Shipyard (hull #56)	115	85 feet	First tunnel boat to operate on the Yukon River. Originally owned by Empire Transportation Co. Transferred to the Northern Navigation Co. in 1901. Registry closed in 1907 or 1908.
Gertrude	U.S.A. #86423	1898	New Whatcom, Washington	A. L. Walsh	17	39 feet	Originally owned by Little Rhody-Alaska Mining & Transportation Co. Abandoned in 1922 or 1923.
Gladys	Canada #107722	1899	Jersey City, New Jersey	Marine Vapor Engine Co.	9	45 feet	External combustion, but originally used alcohol vapor instead of steam as the working fluid. Originally owned by the North-West Mounted Police. The NWMP became the Royal Northwest Mounted Police in 1904. Boat converted to steam power in 1906. Sold to Pine Creek Power Co. in 1910. Sold to the Inland Trading Co. in 1914. Abandoned at Atlin, British Columbia in 1930. Remains still at Atlin.: Named for Jean Gladys Perry (1887–1972), daughter of Aylesworth Bowen Perry, commander of the NWMP in the Yukon from 1899 to 1900 (Reg. #O.44).
Gold Hunter	None	1898	Alameda, California		4		At Koyukuk River, Alaska during winter of 1898–1899. Last inspected in 1904.
Gov. Stoneman	U.S.A. #86081	1885	Sacramento, California		15	44 feet	Originally owned by California State Fish Commission. Out of commission from 1892 or 1893 until 1897 (including about 6 months at the bottom of the Sacramento River). Sold to M. Nixon Kimball and L. Stuart Upson in 1897. Wrecked in a storm near Nome, Alaska in 1900.
Gussie Brown (Dawson City, 1898–1903)	U.S.A. #157508	1898	San Francisco, California	Stone & Wilson	119	83 feet	Originally owned by the Alaska Mining & Transportation Co. Sold to Joseph Gawley by 1925. Abandoned in 1926 or 1927.
1st Herbert	None	1898	St. Michael, Alaska		5		Operated on the Lower Yukon River. Owned by George M. Pilcher. Last inspected in 1902. Listed in Jones (1904).: Named for Herbert H. Pilcher (1863–1934), older brother of George M.
2nd Herbert	U.S.A. #203375	1906	Anvik, Alaska		12	30 feet	Owned by George M. Pilcher. Registry closed in 1919 or 1920.: Named for Herbert H. Pilcher (1863–1934), older brother of George M.
Hettie B	U.S.A. #96278	1894	San Francisco, California		27	43 feet	Originally a sloop with an auxiliary gasoline engine and screw propeller, and owned by John A. McNear. Sold to Alaska-Yukon Transportation Co. in 1897. Converted to steam power-screw propeller in 1898. May have been at Koyukuk River, Alaska during winter of 1898–1899. Converted back to gasoline power in 1902. Eventually owned by George D. Schofield. Stranded at Safety Lagoon, Alaska in 1919.
Jessie	Canada #107721	1899	Jersey City, New Jersey	Marine Vapor Engine Co.	9	45 feet	External combustion, but used alcohol vapor instead of steam as the working fluid. Originally owned by the North-West Mounted Police. The NWMP became the Royal Northwest Mounted Police in 1904. Boat sold to A. J. W. Bridgeman and R. Greenwood in 1908. Registry closed in 1920.: Named for Jessie E. Perry (1886–1974), daughter of Aylesworth Bowen Perry, commander of the NWMP in the Yukon from 1899 to 1900 (Reg. #O.44).
Joe Mathews	U.S.A. #77286	1898	Everett, Washington	Cascade Development Co.	46	46 feet	Owned by Cascade Development Co. At Arctic City, Alaska on the Koyukuk River during the winter of 1898–1899. Stranded at Cape Nome, Alaska in 1899. In 1906, hull rebuilt, reduced from 46 to 19 gross tons, and converted to gasoline power. Eventually owned by J. Myron Haley. Stranded at Cape Darby, Alaska in 1910.: Named for Joseph R. "Joe" Mathews (1865–1935), Alaska steamboat pilot.
Koakuk (Cora, until about 1894)	None	1887	San Francisco, California			35 feet	Purchased by William D. "Billy" Moore and Gordon C. Bettles in 1891. Transferred to Bettles alone, and rebuilt about 1894. Operated on the Koyukuk River and Lower Yukon River. Disposed of after 1904.
Little Jim	None	1898	Carcross, Yukon	Iowa-Alaska Mining Co.			Owned by the IAM Co. At Koyukuk River, Alaska during winter of 1898–1899.
Mabel F	Canada #107259	1898	Bennett, British Columbia	C. Kersting	10	40 feet	Originally owned by John M. Flower. Sold to Edward W. G. "Ted" Tennant in 1902. Resold to P. H. Johnson by 1906. Resold to Matthew Watson in 1918 or 1919. Resold to John Williams in 1924. Registry closed in 1948. Scuttled in Nares Lake, Yukon in 1950.
Mariam	None	1897	Seattle, Washington		[launch]		Owned by North American Transportation & Trading Co. Foundered near Stuart Island, Alaska in 1899.
Marie Balmer	U.S.A. #208035	1910	St. Michael, Alaska		9	54 feet	Originally gasoline power-screw propeller. Owned by Edwin H. Flynn. Converted to steam power in 1913 or 1914. Abandoned in 1922 or 1923.
Rebecca	None	1898	Brooklyn, New York	U.S. Navy Yard, New York	7		Owned by U.S. Government. Operated on the Lower Yukon River beginning in 1898. Last inspected in 1907.
Sirene	None	1894	Nyack, New York		4		At Koyukuk River, Alaska during winter of 1898–1899. For sale in 1899. Last inspected in 1900. Listed in Jones (1904).
Tagish	None	1899	Jersey City, New Jersey	Marine Vapor Engine Co.		28 feet	External combustion, but used alcohol vapor instead of steam as the working fluid. Originally owned by the North-West Mounted Police. The NWMP became the Royal Northwest Mounted Police in 1904. Boat sold to the British Columbia Government in 1908.: Tagish was derived from the Tagish phrase taa-gish, which means breakup of ice. This name refers to the sound that the Tagish River ice makes during spring breakup. The Tagish Indians adopted this name to identify themselves because, prior to 1898, they spent their winters along the Tagish River.
Wm. McKinley	None	1898	St. Michael, Alaska		5		At Koyukuk River, Alaska during winter of 1898–1899. Wrecked in a storm at St. Michael in 1899.
Wm. Ogilvie	Canada #107527	1899	Bennett, British Columbia	James B. Colvin	82	63 feet	Originally owned by Teslin Yukon Steam Navigation Co. Sold to Harry E. Brown in 1912. Resold to the Inland Trading Co. in 1913. Abandoned at Taku City, British Columbia in 1938.
Winthrop	None	1898	St. Michael, Alaska		7		At Koyukuk River, Alaska during winter of 1898–1899. For sale in 1899. Last inspected in 1900. Listed in Jones (1904).
Witch Hazel	None	1894	Bridal Veil, Oregon			27 feet	Owned by Frank D. Atkins and Edward L. Bushnell. Operated on the Upper Yukon River in 1894 and 1895. Abandoned near Hootalinqua in 1895. Revived and travelled downriver in 1898. Hull last reported to be at Ft. Cudahy, Yukon.: Witch Hazel, Oregon was (and is) a small community about 44 miles from Bridal Veil, and near the home of a person named Frank Atkins. The witch hazel plant is not native to Oregon.
Wyvern	Canada #107160	1898	Dartmouth, United Kingdom		8	45 feet	Owned by Edward M. Bruce. Wrecked on the Snake River, Yukon in 1900.
Yellow Kid	Canada #107258	1898	Lindeman, British Columbia		3	29 feet	Owned by F. Porter Worsnop. Wrecked and abandoned in 1920.
Yukon	U.S.A. #27578	1869	San Francisco, California	John W. Gates	20	49 feet	Originally owned by Parrott & Co. Parrott & Co. was absorbed by the Alaska Commercial Co. in 1870. Wrecked by ice at Ft. Yukon, Alaska in 1880.: For remarks relating to the name Yukon, see, Remarks for 2nd Yukon, U.S.A. #165172, under White Pass and Yukon Route, above.

Misc. Yukon River Gas and Diesel Boats, 1900–1954
Name	Registry (-ies)	Year built	Where Built	Builder	Volume (gross tons)	Hull Length	Remarks
Admiral (Claude B. Hanthorn, 1896- 1905)	U.S.A. #127123	1896	Seattle, Washington		35	58 feet	Originally, gasoline power-screw propeller and owned by James O. Hanthorn. Converted to steam power in 1899 or 1900. Converted back to gasoline power in 1905. Stranded at Andreafsky, Alaska later in 1905.: Named for Claude B. Hanthorn (1876–1948), son of James O.
Agulleit	U.S.A. #214487	1916	Hastings, Alaska		16	42 feet	Originally, gasoline power-screw propeller. Owned by Northern Commercial Co. Converted to Diesel power in 1954. Destroyed by ice at Emmonak, Alaska in 1971.: Agulleit possibly derived from Aleut aĝuliix, or from Alutiiq aarulik, both of which mean hawk.
Alatna	U.S.A. #210645	1912	Fairbanks, Alaska	Edmund Marson	10	64 feet	Gasoline power-screw propeller. Owned by Edmund Marson. Abandoned in 1936 or 1937.: Alatna was derived from a Koyukon phrase aalaa tne, which means other-people [on-this] river.
Anna E	U.S.A. #107603	1900	St. Michael, Alaska		17	60 feet	Gasoline power-screw propeller. Disposed of by 1901.
2nd Atlinto	None	1911	Atlin, British Columbia	Jules Eggert		41 feet	Gasoline power-screw propeller. Originally owned by Jules Eggert. Inherited by Paul Eggert in 1922. Sold to John Noland in 1927. Ran until the 1950s. Subsequently, donated to Atlin Historical Society. On display at Atlin.: Atlinto was derived from the hybrid phrase áa tlein tóo, consisting of the Tlingit phrase for big lake, plus the Tagish word for water: literally, big lake water. In turn, the name Atlinto River literally means big lake water river.
Bertha	U.S.A. #222524	1922	Fairbanks, Alaska		14	53 feet	Gasoline power-stern wheel. Originally owned by George C. Moody. Sold to George S. Black in 1933 or 1934. Abandoned in 1937 or 1938.: Named for Bertha C. Moody (1871–1957), wife of George C.
Bessie D	U.S.A. #222525	1922	Tanana, Alaska		21	50 feet	Gasoline power-screw propeller. Owned by Edwin P. Allard. Abandoned in 1932 or 1933.
Bonnie G	U.S.A. #265321	1941	Big Delta, Alaska		46	60 feet	Diesel power-stern wheel. Originally owned by Donald A. Peterson. Peterson died in 1967. Registry closed between 1981 & 1988.
Carrier	U.S.A. #208125	1908	San Francisco, California		6	30 feet	Gasoline power-screw propeller. Owned by Northern Commercial Co. Destroyed by fire in 1915.
Chetco	U.S.A. #126409	1887	Benicia, California		103	84 feet	Gasoline power-screw propeller. Originally owned by J. S. Kimball & Co. Sold to Luther H. Griffith in 1897. Registry closed in 1903 or 1904.: Chetco was derived from the Chetco metaphor che-ti, which literally means at the tail, and figuratively refers to at the mouth of a river.
Claude B. Hanthorn	......	......	......	......	......	......	See, Admiral.
Dan	U.S.A. #207507	1910	Seattle, Washington		13	60 feet	Gasoline power-stern wheel. Owned by Jack Dobler in 1913. Owned by Capt. George C. "Charles" Finger by 1925. Abandoned in 1927 or 1928.
Danaco No. 1	U.S.A. #226606	1927	Houghton, Washington		14	62 feet	Diesel power-screw propeller. Originally owned by Day Navigation Co. Sold to Harry Donnelley in 1944. Sold to Kuskokwim Transportation Co. in 1949. Sold to Northern Transportation & Equipment Co. in 1951. Sold to Alaska Towing & Salvage Co. between 1952 & 1954. Abandoned between 1965 & 1967.: Danaco is an acronym for Day Navigation Co.
Danaco No. 2	U.S.A. #226607	1927	Houghton, Washington		11	62 feet	Gasoline power-screw propeller. Originally owned by Day Navigation Co. Sold to Harry Donnelley in 1944. Abandoned in 1956.: Danaco is an acronym for Day Navigation Co.
Danaco No. 7	U.S.A. #233723	1935	Houghton, Washington		14	60 feet	Gasoline power-screw propeller. Originally owned by Day Navigation Co. Sold to Harry Donnelley in 1944. Sold to George S. Black Estate in 1956. Sold to Yutana Barge Lines, Inc. in 1964. Sold to Yukon Fishing & Transportation Co. between 1965 & 1967. Registry closed between 1981 & 1988.: Danaco is an acronym for Day Navigation Co.
Democrat	U.S.A. #215922	1918	Seattle, Washington		34	56 feet	Gasoline power-screw propeller. Owned by Hans Hamm by 1925. Sold to Nordby Supply Co. in 1927 or 1928. Wrecked in the Yukon River in 1931.
Discovery II	......	......	......	......	......	......	See, Yutana.
Dispatch	None	1903	St. Michael, Alaska	Northern Commercial Co.		35 feet	Originally owned by the NC Co.
Dr. Martin	U.S.A. #215793	1917	Seattle, Washington	Capt. Anderson	28	61 feet	Gasoline power-screw propeller. Originally owned by King County, Washington. Sold to Northern Commercial Co. in 1924. Destroyed by fire in 1926.
Dorothy	U.S.A. #157505	1898	Seattle, Washington		126	75 feet	Originally steam power-stern wheel and owned by Koyukuk Mining & Exploration Co. At Bergman, Alaska on the Koyukuk River during the winter of 1898–1899. KM&E Co. dissolved in 1904. Boat converted to gasoline power in 1911. Registry closed in 1916 or 1917.: Named for Dorothy W. Lund (1897–1972), daughter of Capt. George H. Wonson of the KM&E Co.
Elaine G	U.S.A. #258597	1945	Fairbanks, Alaska		84	64 feet	Diesel power-stern wheel. Originally owned by Donald A. Peterson. Peterson died in 1967. Registry closed in 1970.
Emily	U.S.A. #204379	1907	St. Michael, Alaska		11	47 feet	Gasoline power-screw propeller. Originally owned by Albert E. Edwards. Owned by John B. Sifton by 1925. Sold to Fred B. Jorgensen in 1931 or 1932. Stranded at Juneau, Alaska in 1943.: Named for Emily Edwards (1901-fl. 1920), daughter of Albert E.
Emma R	None	by 1946					Diesel power-stern wheel. Owned by Donald A. Peterson. Reported to exist in 1955.
Emma R No. 2	None	by 1946					Diesel power-stern wheel. Owned by Donald A. Peterson. Reported to exist in 1946.
Emmonak (Kantishna, 1968- 2005; Grayling, after 2005–present)	U.S.A. #532268	1945	Jersey City, New Jersey	Walsh Construction Co.	80	44 feet	Gasoline power-screw propeller. Owned by Weaver Bros. prior to 1968. Sold to Black Navigation Co. in 1968. Enlarged to 54' × 22' in 1980. Transferred to Crowley Marine Services, Inc. in 2005. Sold to Cruz Marine, LLC and converted to a barge in 2013.: Emmonak is derived from the Yup'ik word imangaq, which means blackfish. Kanitshna is derived from the Koyukon phrase hentooł na, which means uncertain river.
Ensee	U.S.A. #227463	1923	Seattle, Washington		86	67 feet	Gasoline power-screw propeller. Owned by Northern Commercial Co. Broken up at St. Michael, Alaska in 1967.: Ensee is the vocalization of the initials of the NC Co.
Frontiersman	Canada #116614	1908	Whitehorse, Yukon		4	45 feet	Gasoline power-stern wheel. Owned by Clair Marcil and Thomas Smith. Disposed of in 1920.
Grayling	......	......	......	......	......	......	See, Emmonak.
Hazel B No. 1	U.S.A. #243456	1941	Wrangell, Alaska		102	65 feet	Diesel power-screw propeller. Originally owned by Capt. Sydney C. Barrington. Sold to Harry Donnelley in 1945. Sold to Kuskokwim Transportation Co. in 1949. Sold to Alaska Towing & Salvage Co. in 1952 or 1953. Abandoned between 1965 & 1967.: Named for Hazel Barrington (1877–1954), wife of Capt. Sydney C.
Hazel B No. 2 ("ST 467" during World War II)	U.S.A. #231646	1932	Seattle, Washington	Marine Construction Co.	143	93 feet	Diesel power-screw propeller. Originally owned by Capt. Sydney C. Barrington. Operated for U.S. Army during World War II as "ST 467." Sold to Alaska Dept. of Health in 1952 or 1953. Sold to Donald A. Peterson in 1955. Peterson died in 1967. Registry closed between 1981 & 1988.: Named for Hazel Barrington (1877–1954), wife of Capt. Sydney C.
Hettie B	U.S.A. #96278	1894	San Francisco, California		27	43 feet	Originally a sloop with an auxiliary gasoline engine and screw propeller and owned by John A. McNear. Sold to Alaska-Yukon Transportation Co. in 1897. Converted to steam power-screw propeller in 1898. May have been at Koyukuk River, Alaska during winter of 1898–1899. Converted back to gasoline power in 1902. Eventually owned by George D. Schofield. Stranded at Safety Lagoon, Alaska in 1919.
Idler	U.S.A. #209222	1911	Fairbanks, Alaska	Fred G. Noyes	71	64 feet	Originally, steam power-stern wheel (chain drive). Originally owned by Fred G. Noyes. Sold to George S. Black, converted to Diesel power, and reduced from 98 to 71 gross tons in 1935. Transferred to George S. Black Estate in 1953. Abandoned in 1956.
Joe Mathews	U.S.A. #77286	1898	St. Michael, Alaska		19	46 feet	Originally, steam power-screw propeller and owned by Cascade Development Co. At Arctic City, Alaska on the Koyukuk River during the winter of 1898–1899. Stranded at Cape Nome, Alaska in 1899. In 1906, hull rebuilt, reduced from 46 to 19 gross tons, and converted to Gasoline power. Eventually owned by J. Myron Haley. Stranded at Cape Darby, Alaska in 1910.: Named for Joseph R. "Joe" Mathews (1865–1935), Alaska steamboat pilot.
Kantishna	......	......	......	......	......	......	See, Emmonak.
Keystone	U.S.A. #208580	1911	Seattle, Washington		14	55 feet	Gasoline power-stern wheel. Owned by Keystone Transportation Co. Abandoned in 1923 or 1924.
Kusko	U.S.A. #237519	1938	Fairbanks, Alaska	George S. Black	17	50 feet	Diesel power-screw propeller. Originally owned by George S. Black. Transferred to George S. Black Estate in 1953. Sold to Yutana Barge Lines, Inc. in 1964. Registry closed between 1981 & 1988.
Marie Balmer	U.S.A. #208035	1910	St. Michael, Alaska		9	54 feet	Originally gasoline power-screw propeller. Owned by Edwin H. Flynn. Converted to steam power in 1913 or 1914. Abandoned in 1922 or 1923.
Martha Angeline	None	about 1916					Gasoline power-screw propeller. Acquired by Alaska Dept. of Education and became a hospital boat in 1926. Retired in 1935.
Mary	U.S.A. #223314	1922	Fairbanks, Alaska		11	43 feet	Gasoline power-screw propeller. Owned by Waechter Bros. in 1926. Sold to Northern Commercial Co. in 1929 or 1930. Sold to John Monohan in 1930 or 1931. Abandoned in 1943.
2nd Messenger	U.S.A. #208034	1908	San Francisco, California		10	44 feet	Gasoline power-screw propeller. Owned by Northern Commercial Co. Abandoned in 1922 or 1923.
Mildred	U.S.A. #241824	1928	Nenana, Alaska		40	61 feet	Diesel power-screw propeller. Originally owned by Northern Commercial Co. Sold to Evans Hawk in 1971. Sold to Hakala Navigation Co. in 1972. Registry closed between 1981 & 1988.
Misabe No. 1	U.S.A. #230855	1931	Belmar, New Jersey		14	37 feet	Gasoline power-screw propeller. Owned by Northern Commercial Co. Broken up at St. Michael, Alaska in 1969.: Misabe is derived from an Ojibwe word which means giant.
Mud Hen	U.S.A. #237901	1928	Fairbanks, Alaska		14	40 feet	Gasoline power-screw propeller. Owned by George S. Black. Abandoned in 1949.
3rd Northern Light	U.S.A. #223316	1922	Nenana, Alaska		18	38 feet	Gasoline power-screw propeller. Owned by Samuel Clow. Abandoned in 1932 or 1933.
No. 1	U.S.A. #249012	1945	Fairbanks, Alaska		113	111 feet	Diesel power-screw propeller. Originally owned by Donald A. Peterson. Peterson died in 1967. Registry closed between 1981 & 1988.
No. 2	U.S.A. #249013	1945	Fairbanks, Alaska		113	111 feet	Originally, Diesel power-screw propeller and owned by Donald A. Peterson. Converted to a barge in 1956. Peterson died in 1967. Registry closed between 1981 & 1988.
Ohio	None						Gasoline power-screw propeller. Eventually owned by Empire Transportation Co.
Pelican No. 4	U.S.A. #230869	1931	Seattle, Washington	Norman Blanchard	19	51 feet	Gasoline power-screw propeller. Originally owned by George S. Black. Transferred to George S. Black Estate in 1953. Sold to Charles M. Binkley, Jr. and William English in 1956. Sold to Inland Riverways, Inc. in 1958. Broken up in 1968.
Play Fair	U.S.A. #246020	1928	Seattle, Washington		14	31 feet	Gasoline power-screw propeller. Owned by Clarence Dull by 1944. Sold to Northern Commercial Co. in 1947. Abandoned in 1954.
Roosevelt	None						Gasoline power-screw propeller. Owned by Northern Commercial Co.
Rough Rider	U.S.A. #111410	1902	Ballard, Washington		11	60 feet	Gasoline power-stern wheel. Originally owned by Hoey V. V. Bean and Capt. Ernest C. Miller. Sold to Keystone Transportation Co. between 1905 & 1907. Abandoned in 1924 or 1925.
Sadie	U.S.A. #202452	1905	St. Michael, Alaska		8	34 feet	Gasoline power-screw propeller. Registry closed in 1912 or 1913.
Sea Wolf	U.S.A. #245555	1939	Holikachuk, Alaska		38	54 feet	Gasoline power-stern wheel. Owned by Harry Donnelley by 1944. Sold to Nick Demientieff in 1958. Registry closed in 1970.
Shamrock	None	by 1929					Originally, steam power-stern wheel. Obtained by Klondike Airways about 1929. Subsequently, converted to Gasoline power. Retired in 1938.
ST 467	......	......	......	......	......	......	See, Hazel B No. 2.
Taku Chief	U.S.A. #237245	1938	Seattle, Washington	Olson & Sunde Marine Works	42	59 feet	Diesel power-screw propeller. Originally owned by the Taku Vessel Co. Sold to U.S. Civil Aeronautics Board in 1945. Sold to Yutana Barge Lines, Inc. in 1956. Condemned in 1978. On display at Nenana, Alaska.: Taku is a contraction of the Tlingit phrase t’aawák galakú, which means a flooding of Canada geese.
Tana	U.S.A. #201820	1905	Seattle, Washington		234	106 feet	Originally, gasoline power-stern wheel and owned by Capt. Wallace Langley. Converted to steam power in 1906. Sold to Alaska Rivers Navigation Co. in 1933. Abandoned in 1940.: Tana was derived from the Ahtna phrase łtaan na’, which means "bagged-object-is-in-position" river. Most likely, a contraction or an idiom.
Tanana	U.S.A. #222526	1922	Tanana, Alaska		10	52 feet	Gasoline power-screw propeller. Owned by H. F. Bryam. Abandoned in 1930 or 1931.: Tanana derived from the Lower Tanana phrase tene no’, which is not the name of the Tanana River, but is the name of the village. Means river trail.
The Marion	None	1945	Old Crow, Yukon		30		Gasoline power-screw propeller. Owned by Northern Commercial Co.
Tolovana	U.S.A. #233318	1923	Nenana, Alaska		16	40 feet	Gasoline power-stern wheel. Owned by John Barrack. Abandoned in 1929 or 1930.: Tolovana was derived from the Lower Tanana phrase to lbo no’, which means grey water river.
Visitor	U.S.A. #228079	1928	St. Michael, Alaska		13	39 feet	Gasoline power-screw propeller. Owned by George T. Butler. Destroyed by fire at Hamilton, Alaska in 1933.
Vixen	Canada #116612	1907	Whitehorse, Yukon	Eli Verreau	5	40 feet	Gasoline power-screw propeller. Owned by Eli Verreau. Broken up in 1918.
Wave	U.S.A. #204697	1907	Decatur, Washington		11	42 feet	Gasoline power-screw propeller. Owned by E. H. Pfaffle by 1925. Sold to Lomen Reindeer Corp. in 1927 or 1928. Abandoned in 1948.
Yutana (Discovery II, 1970–present)	U.S.A. #271285	1953	Fairbanks, Alaska	Arthur L. Peterson	122	81 feet	Diesel power-stern wheel. Originally owned by George S. Black. Transferred to George S. Black estate in 1953. Sold to Alaska Riverways, Inc. in 1967. Rebuilt in 1970. Now 180 gross tons and 116 feet long.: Yutana is a blend of Yukon and Tanana.
