= Tr'ochëk =

Hän settlement in Yukon, Canada

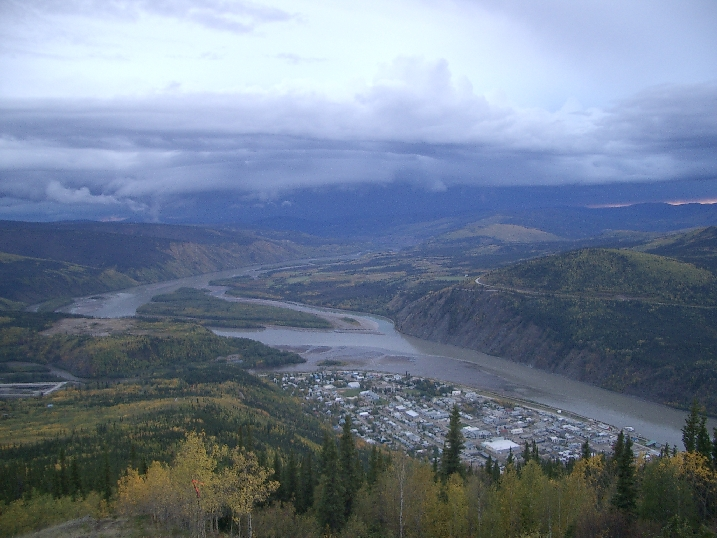
Tr'ochëk, shown just above Dawson City

Tr'ochëk is the site of a traditional Hän fishing camp at the confluence of the Klondike River and Yukon River in Yukon, Canada. Tr'ochëk lies on the upstream flat, an alluvial deposition of the Klondike River, at the river confluence. Dawson City is directly north of the site, just across the Klondike. The site is owned and managed by the Tr’ondëk Hwëch’in First Nation, and is operated by the First Nation's Department of Heritage. Tr'ochëk became part of the Tr’ondëk-Klondike UNESCO World Heritage Site in 2023 because of its unique testimony to the transformation of the Klondike landscape from Indigenous to colonial use.

Tr'ochëk was used as a fishing ground at several different times, with the oldest archaeological evidence dating from 1500-1700 CE. In the late 19th century Tr'ochëk was the camp of Chief Isaac, the leader of the Tr'ondëk Hwëch'in during the Klondike Gold Rush. The Tr'onëek people used this site primarily in the summer, hunting moose in the flats across the Klondike and fishing for salmon during their migration up the Yukon.

The river flat has a mixture of poplar trees, alder and willow bushes, with open grassy meadows. The steep hillside behind the site is covered with vegetation typical of a northern exposure boreal forest - thick moss, spruce, and small birch groves. On the bench above the flat, mining activity has stripped away both vegetation and soil, leaving a fringe of the original spruce forest along the edge of the river bluffs.

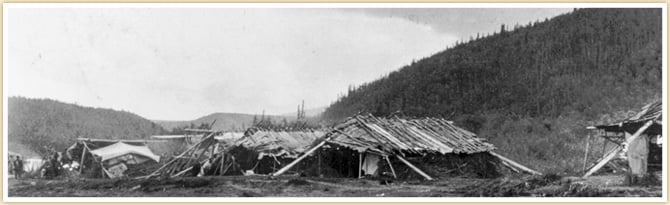
Brush shelters at Tr'ochëk, 1895

The gold rush was a period of great disruption for the Tr'ondëk Hwëch'in. Thousands of stampeders overwhelmed them at their summer camp. To avoid the worst excesses of this time, the Tr'ondëk Hwëch'in made arrangements, with the assistance of the Anglican Church and the Royal Canadian Mounted Police, to move a few kilometres downriver to a site known as Moosehide.

After the Tr'ondëk Hän relocation to Moosehide (64°05′40″N 139°26′12″W), Tr'ochëk was used by the non-native newcomers for a series of urban and industrial activities. Several bridges connected the site to Dawson City and until the 1910s, Klondike City, as the site became known, remained a fairly active part of the Dawson urban area. Later, as the newcomer population dwindled, the site was used for a time for market gardening. First Nation people began resettling the site in the 1950s.

In the early 1990s mining activity on the site instigated a lawsuit by the Tr'ondëk Hwëch'in challenging Canada's right to issue mining claims on unsurrendered Indian lands. The Tr'ondëk Hwëch'in reaffirmed their ownership of the site in their land claim final agreement in 1998, and designated it as a heritage site. It was subsequently designated as a National Historic Site of Canada on July 19, 2002.
