= Trʼondëk Hwëchʼin First Nation =

First Nation government in Yukon, Canada

Trʼondëk Hwëchʼin
- Band No. 494
- People: Hän
- Treaty: Trʼondëk Hwëchʼin Final Agreement
- Headquarters: Dawson City
- Territory: Yukon

Population (2019)
- On reserve: 3
- On other land: 174
- Off reserve: 688
- Total population: 865

Government
- Chief: Darren Taylor

Website
- trondek.ca

The Trʼondëk Hwëchʼin ([ʈʂʼoⁿdək hwətʃʼin]; formerly the Dawson Indian Band) is a First Nation band government located in the Canadian territory of Yukon. Its main population centre is Dawson City, Yukon.

Many of today's Trʼondëk Hwëchʼin, or people of the river, are descendants of the Hän-speaking people who have lived along the Yukon River for thousands of years. They traveled extensively throughout their traditional territory harvesting salmon from the Yukon River and caribou from the Fortymile and Porcupine Herds. Moose, small game, and a variety of plants and berries provided additional food sources. Other raw materials needed to make tools, clothing and shelter were procured from this diverse and rich environment. The Hän traded with neighboring First Nations people and maintained interrelations through family connections and frequent gatherings.

In the mid-19th century, European fur traders and missionaries established a presence in the territory. Contact with the newcomers presented new challenges and opportunities for the Hän. Trade increased and new goods and economic practices were introduced. The Hän used a combination of traditional and newly introduced skills, goods and materials to maintain their survival and assist the newcomers.

In the 1880s gold was discovered in the Chʼëdäh Dëk, or Fortymile River, area – a site used by the Hän as a caribou interception point and grayling fishing spot. In 1896 more gold was discovered near Tr'ochëk, at the confluence of the Yukon and Klondike Rivers. The Klondike River hosted abundant salmon stocks and the Hän had an encampment at Tr'ochëk that was used seasonally for hundreds of years. The ensuing rush brought thousands of people to Tr'ochëk and surrounding areas.

Recognizing the influences that the newcomers would have on his people, Hän leader Chief Isaac worked with the Government of Canada and the Anglican Church to move his people from Tr'ochëk to Moosehide, 5 km (3.1 mi) downriver (64°05′40″N 139°26′12″W). Chief Isaac was respected among his own people and newcomers alike. While he welcomed the stampeders, "he never failed to remind them that they prospered at the expense of the original inhabitants by driving away their game and taking over their land." Chief Isaac envisioned the impact that new lifestyles would have on Hän traditional culture. In response he entrusted many songs and dances to First Nations people living in Alaska.

During the years following the Klondike Gold Rush, the Hän worked to find a balance between their traditional lifestyle and the ways of the newcomers.

Yukon First Nations set the land claims process in motion during the 1970s. Trʼondëk Hwëchʼin began negotiating their individual Land Claim in 1991. The Trʼondëk Hwëchʼin Final Agreement was signed on July 16, 1998, and came into effect on September 15, 1998.

In 2022, the mummified body of a young woolly mammoth was discovered during a mining operation on land belonging to the Trʼondëk Hwëchʼin.

The Tr’ondëk-Klondike World Heritage Site, a UNESCO World Heritage Site in Canada, protects a series of eight properties that attest to the effects of the rapid colonization of the area, including the Gold Rush, on the Tr’ondëk Hwëch’in people. The World Heritage Site was designated in 2023. All but one of the properties (Dawson City) are on Tr'ondëk Hwëch’in settlement lands or co-managed lands. The nomination had been spearheaded by the Trʼondëk Hwëchʼin people.

== History ==
The Tr’ondëk Hwëch’in First Nation, one of the First Nations of the Athabascan peoples in Canada’s Yukon Territory, traces its history back over ten millennia, according to their own perspective. They consider themselves an integral part of the land along the Yukon River (known as Chu Kon’ Dëk in their language) and the Klondike River (Trʼondëk). Traditionally residing in the area around Dawson, they were historically referred to as the Dawson Indian Band. They are primarily descendants of the largest local group of the southernmost regional band of the Hän (Hän Hwëch’in) (“people who live along the river – the Yukon”) during the Klondike Gold Rush. They were also frequently named after their influential chief, Isaac, as the Chief Isaac People or Isaac’s Band. Alongside a small group in the Alaska Native village of Native Eagle Village near Eagle (Tthee T’äwdlenn) in eastern Alaska, they speak the Häɬ goɬan or Hän language.

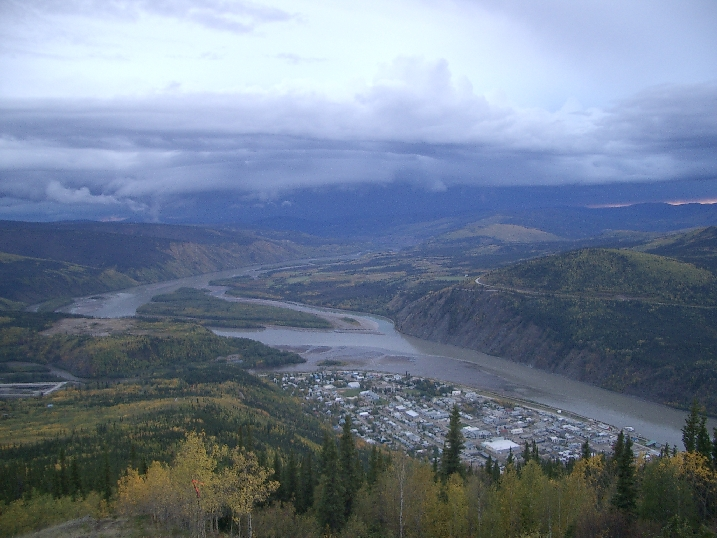
View of the Yukon and Dawson, Tr'ochëk on the left

In 1995, the First Nation adopted its current name, derived from their autonym Tr’ondek Hwech’in or Tr’ondëk Hwëch’in (“people along the Klondike”). This name originates from Trʼondëk, referring to the Klondike River (from Tro, meaning “hammerstones used to secure salmon weirs”, and Ndëk, meaning “river”), combined with Hwech’in or Hwëch’in (“people,” literally “inhabitants of a region”). Today, they identify as the “people at the mouth of the Klondike River,” referencing their historically significant settlement of Tr’ochëk (“mouth of the Klondike”), located on the northern bank opposite Dawson City.

The Tr’ondëk Hwëch’in adapted to the harsh climate of the Canadian Northwest through a semi-nomadic lifestyle, centred on permanent winter villages with a storage-based economy and seasonal migration cycles tied to hunting and gathering resources. Fishing, particularly of salmon, and hunting caribou provided the bulk of their food, clothing, and tools. Some tools, such as those made from obsidian, and adornments, like specific seashells, were sourced early on through an extensive network of trade, gifting, and exchange with communities in Alaska, northern British Columbia, Vancouver Island, and the Northwest Territories. Copper was also acquired through these networks. The atlatl was likely replaced by the bow and arrow around 600 CE.

European traders, arriving after 1800, were gradually integrated into this extensive network of trails, contacts, and goods, though global trade, dominated by powers such as Russia, Britain, and later the United States, increasingly influenced the region. The Hän first made direct contact with the British in 1847. By 1874, they received an American trading company to establish a post nearby. The British Hudson’s Bay Company initially competed with Russian fur traders and, after the U.S. purchased Alaska in 1867, with American firms, notably the Alaska Commercial Company.

More devastating than trade, however, was the Hän’s vulnerability to European-introduced diseases, such as smallpox, measles, and tuberculosis, a fate shared by many Indigenous groups. Alongside fur traders, gold prospectors increasingly infiltrated the region, further altering living conditions in this remote area.

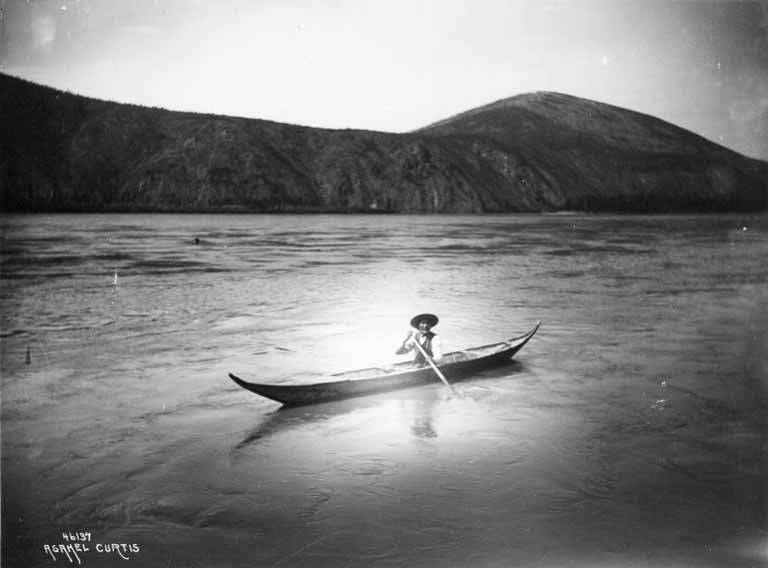
Chief Isaac in his canoe on the Yukon River, photographed in 1898

The Klondike Gold Rush, beginning in 1896, brought an overwhelming influx of up to 100,000 newcomers, reducing the Hän to a small minority of a few hundred. This period also saw the rise of an urban society and the relocation of the Hän to Moosehide, a few kilometres from Dawson, where they lived between 1897 and around 1960. Chief Isaac, who died in 1932, was a prominent leader during this time. He resisted the destruction of vital natural resources, particularly the slaughter of caribou herds and cutting of forests, which were essential to their traditional way of life.

In Moosehide, a tribal council was established, and the traditional chieftaincy transitioned to elected leadership. The resource-based economy of the Yukon Territory offered the Han limited employment opportunities, particularly after the Great Depression. The traditional lifestyle persisted until the fur market’s decline around 1950 forced significant changes. Additionally, the non-Indigenous population sharply declined after the gold rush, and the Han faced increasing isolation due to policies of segregation and neglect, which persisted into the 1960s.

Since then, the First Nations have secured political rights, including federal voting rights in 1960. In the Yukon, the Tr’ondëk Hwëch’in, like other First Nations, successfully negotiated the return of their traditional lands with varying rights in 1998. That same year, they adopted a constitution, granting them internal legislative authority. The First Nation actively preserves and promotes its language and culture, which the Canadian government once sought to eradicate, making these elements central to regional tourism.

=== Early history ===
The most significant archaeological site is Tr’ochëk, an island now designated a National Historic Site of Canada located opposite Dawson City. The earliest sustenance came from caribou herds, particularly the Porcupine and Forty Mile herds, which migrated through the Dawson area twice yearly. The latter was estimated at 600,000 animals around 1900, though by 2007 its population was approximately 110,000–112,000, rising to 169,000 by 2010. Other resources included moose, sheep, marmots, pikas, birds, and fish, especially salmon from the Yukon River and Klondike River (the latter named after the Han word for hammerstone). Chinook (king salmon) and later Chum (chum salmon) migrated up the Yukon and its tributaries for spawning from late June, enabling communal fishing. Fish were dried on wooden racks for preservation through the harsh winter.

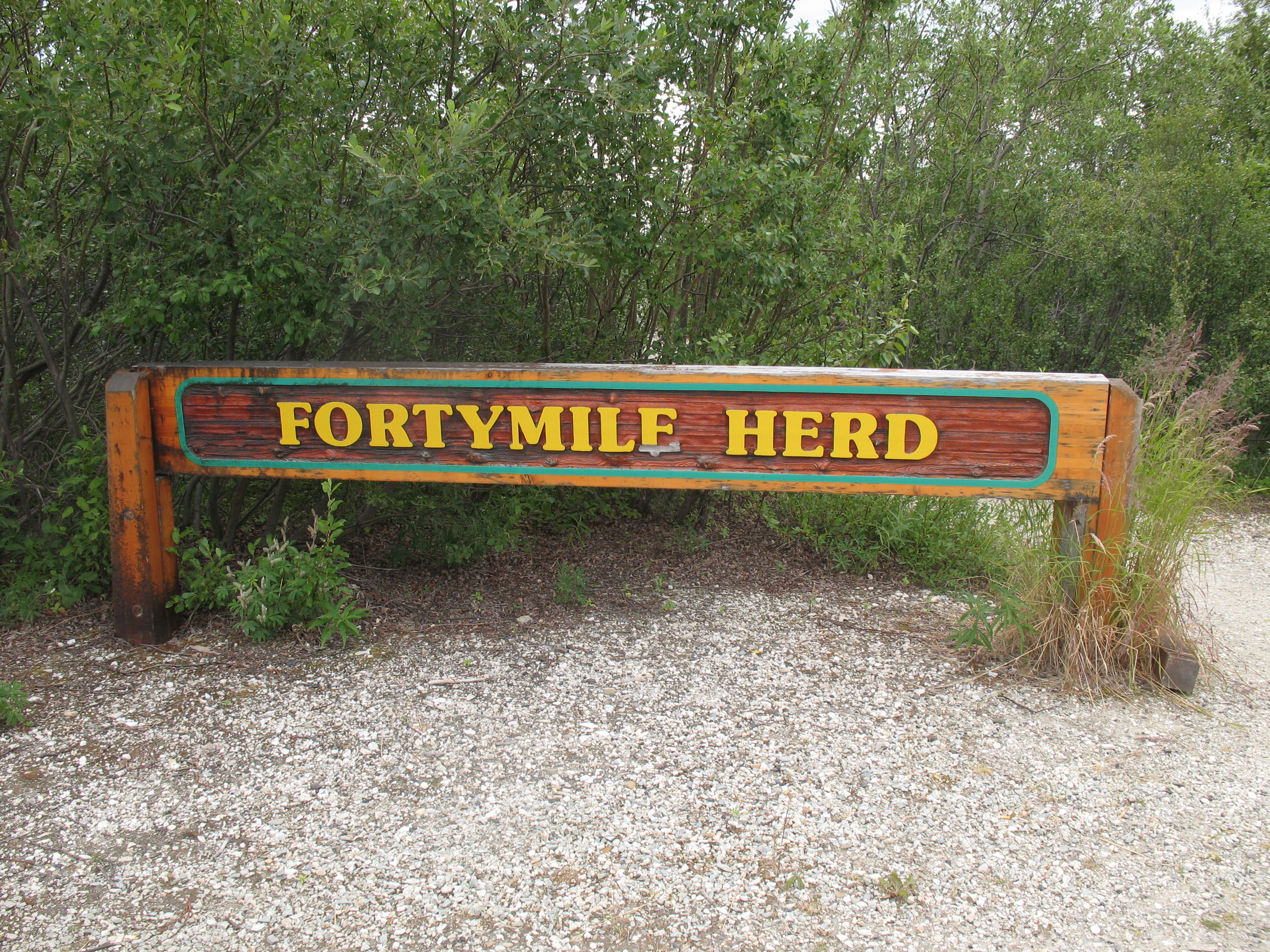
Tribute to the Forty Mile Herd, a huge caribou herd of over half a million animals. As late as 1927, it took ten days to cross the Yukon at the mouth of the Selwyn River

The earliest confirmed archaeological finds in the Yukon are from the Bluefish Caves, dating back at least 12,000 years. In Moosehide and the Dawson area, human traces date back 8,000 years, including stone flakes found at a depth of about 50 cm. The oldest artifact, a piece of caribou antler approximately 11,000 years old, was discovered along Hunker Creek, a Klondike tributary. During this early period, the region was largely treeless.

Around 5000 BCE, large tools were replaced by composite tools combining bone, antler, and tiny blades known as microblades. The oldest traces in Moosehide date to 3600 BCE, possibly as early as 4500 BCE. Obsidian, a volcanic glass indicating long-distance trade, was found there, sourced from southwest Yukon or northern British Columbia at Mount Edziza. Other finds include lance-shaped projectile points, mammal bone fragments, and a stone likely used as a net sinker for fishing.

By 3000–2500 BCE, microblades gave way to notched spear points and a variety of scrapers. The atlatl, adopted from Inuit groups, became a key hunting tool. Annual salmon migrations prompted seasonal movements between fishing sites, a phase known as the Northern Archaic tradition.

Around 600 CE, evidence of bow and arrow use appears, alongside metallurgical techniques driven by trade in copper from the Copper and White River. Two major volcanic eruptions around 150 and 800 CE at White River, near the Alaska-Yukon border, devastated an area of approximately 340,000 km^{2} (130,000 sq mi) in southeast Alaska and southern Yukon, likely isolating the Han’s ancestors from southern contacts. The subsequent Late Prehistoric phase saw gradual repopulation.

Copper was crafted into tools like awls and projectile points, as well as jewellery. Dentalia shells (from tusk shells) and obsidian for tools and points were traded for birch bark (used for baskets and waterproof containers), red ochre for dyeing, and dried salmon. This trade likely combined gift exchange for social status and respect with practical barter, facilitated by gatherings like the potlatch. An extensive network of trails and river routes supported this exchange. Although gold was present in local streams, it held no significance.

=== Before European contact ===
Around 1800, six language groups inhabited the Yukon, five of which were Athabascan, with one being Tlingit. Culturally related groups met regularly, especially for spring and summer fishing. These larger groups dispersed into family units as food resources dwindled in autumn. Winters were spent in permanent villages. Most lived in river valleys or near lakes, venturing to higher elevations only for hunting. The Hän employed sophisticated fishing nets and traps, reflecting a careful resource management shaped by the region’s sparse and slowly regenerating resources. This millennia-long experience fostered a relatively secure lifestyle, in stark contrast to the high losses and reluctance of Europeans to adapt to the northern environment, a perspective the Tr’ondëk Hwëch’in found difficult to comprehend.

Leadership emerged informally, sustained by individual skill and success. Women, though outside formal hierarchies, wielded significant influence as teachers, storytellers, and gatherers.

Shamans, often called “medicine men” or “magicians” by Europeans, held considerable authority due to their deep knowledge of nature and spiritual practices. They served as healers, aided in locating game, and attempted to influence weather.

==== Regional and local groups ====
Within larger social structures, distinctions are made between regional bands, such as the Hän, local bands, and task groups, which are temporary alliances formed for specific purposes. Regional groups convened only for significant gatherings, such as a potlatch, or at locations with sufficient resources to sustain a larger population. These groups were united by kinship, a shared language, and a traditional territory. The regional group of the Tr’ondëk was known as the Hän. In contrast, a local band, such as the Tr’ondëk Hwëch’in, occupied a specific traditional area within the broader region, with defined usage rights. Each group maintained a winter camp and followed a traditional migratory cycle that led them to key hunting and gathering sites. These traditional territories often overlapped, depending on the season, usage rights, and even individual entitlements. This overlap sometimes led to divisions within closely related family structures. Occasionally, multiple local groups or men bound by friendship would unite for hunting or fishing expeditions.

The regional Hän group comprised local bands known around 1900 as David’s band and Charley’s band in present-day Alaska, alongside the Klondike group. Only the latter is referred to as the Tr’ondëk Hwëch’in. It remains uncertain whether a fourth band existed, centred around Nuklako (Jutl’à’ K’ät), where Dawson now stands, or if this was a site used by the Klondike group.

Charley’s band resided furthest north, at the confluence of the Kandik River with the Yukon River, known as Charley Creek (not to be confused with the nearby Charley River). Across the river, at Biederman Camp, lay a second village, and possibly a third, located ten miles downstream along the Yukon at the Charley River. This site later became Independence, a short-lived gold rush settlement. Some residents of the Charley River may have relocated to Fort Yukon between 1900 and 1910. Charley Village was destroyed by a flood in 1914, prompting the chief to lead many residents to Eagle Village. It is unclear whether there were two chiefs with the same name. One chief was noted in 1871 by the Anglican missionary Robert McDonald, who was warmly received. In 1910, Charley Creek Indian Village housed 25 people, 17 of whom were Han, with the remainder from three neighbouring Gwich’in people. By 1911, the population had dwindled to 10–12, and by 1912, only 7 remained, likely due to an influenza epidemic. A flood in 1914 obliterated the village, and the few survivors moved to Circle City.

David’s band, numbering around 65–70 people in 1890, regularly wintered at Mission Creek and the Seventy Mile River. Their hunting grounds extended at least to Comet Creek, Eureka Creek, and American Creek. In the 1880s, most succumbed to smallpox, and the survivors relocated to Forty Mile. One of their camps was at Eagle, where six houses stood. The trading post below the village, Belle Isle, had already been abandoned. Two and a half miles downstream from Eagle was another village with eight houses, also deserted. Chief David died by 1903, when a Potlatch was held in his memory. His son, Peter, succeeded him as chief.

The largest local band was based at the Klondike but never extended its hunting expeditions beyond All Gold Creek, a tributary of Flat Creek, approximately 50 km north of Dawson, due to fears of the Mahoney, with whom they had long been in conflict. The Tr’ondëk travelled by canoe downstream before winter to Coal Creek, Tatonduk River, or Nation River. They spent winters in the Ogilvie Mountains. Just before the end of winter, they moved towards the Klondike, constructed moose-skin boats, and caught salmon at the river mouth.

==== Trade, exchange, and gift-giving ====
The Tr’ondëk participated in an extensive trade network. The Chilkat of the Tlingit brought coveted coastal goods to the interior via two arduous mountain passes. These included seal fat, the buttery oil of the candlefish, dentalia shells, boxes made from Western red cedar, medicinal plants, and European goods such as knives, pans, tin cans, and glass beads, which were widely used for adornment by the elite. In exchange, the Tutchone in southern Yukon provided furs, caribou hide, copper ore, mountain goat hair, sinew, and dyes. The Hän, located further north, traded these goods for additional furs, red ochre (a pigment), birch bark, and salmon. These items were then bartered with the northern Gwich’in, who maintained contact with the Inuit. Marital alliances facilitated these trade networks, extending the cultural and linguistic influence of the Tlingit deep into the Yukon.

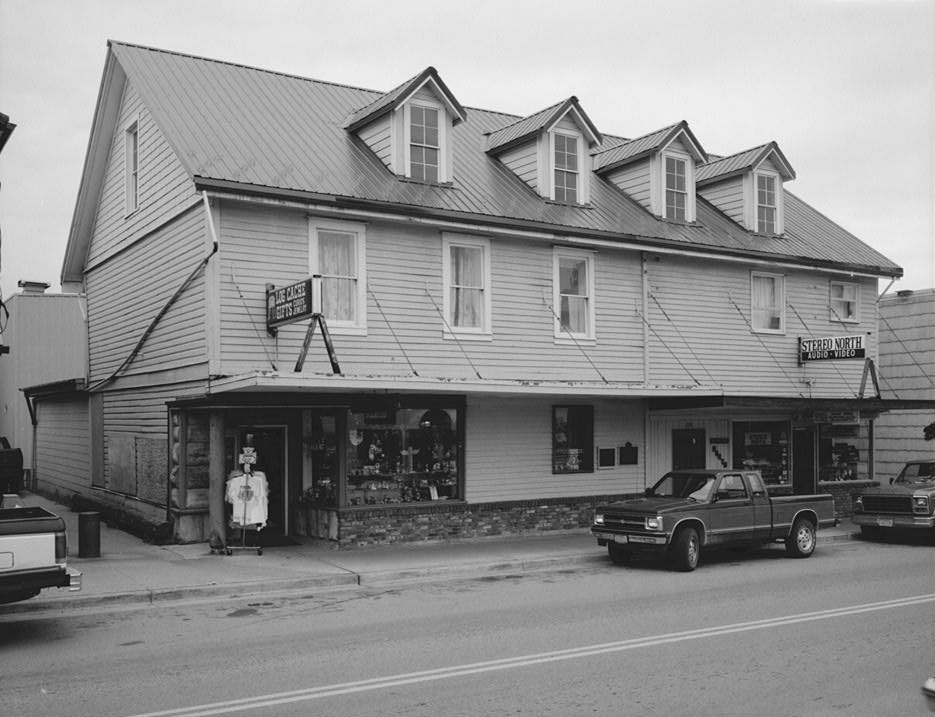
Trading house of the Russian-American Trading Company in Sitka, built in 1852

=== Trade with Europeans and epidemics (from 1789) ===
Both northern and southern groups encountered Europeans by the late 18th century. Alexander Mackenzie had first contact with the Gwich’in in 1789, and Fort Good Hope was founded in 1806. Glass beads swiftly became a common trade item and a measure of value. The Gwich’in, despite resistance from Inuit, who attacked the fort with 500 men, established a trade monopoly from roughly 1826 to 1850.

In the west, competition was fiercer, and indigenous groups resisted more robustly. Russians first appeared in Alaska in 1741. In 1763, the Unangan killed around 200 inhabitants of Unalaska Island, Umnak, and Unimak Island, prompting Russian reprisals that claimed 200 lives; further conflicts ensued. In 1784, clashes occurred on Kodiak Island between Russians and Tlingit, culminating in the Battle of Sitka in 1804, after which the Tlingit abandoned the island until 1819. Despite military dominance, the Russians only partially enforced their fur trade monopoly, as the Tlingit often resisted successfully. The British challenged Russian dominance in Wrangell, leasing the southeastern mainland from them in 1838. The Spanish, also vying for influence, withdrew in 1819 under the Adams-Onís Treaty. In 1839, the Russians established a trading post at Nulato on the lower Yukon, and in 1842, Lavrenty Zagoskin explored the Yukon upstream.

For bands beyond the direct control of Russian or British trading companies, the arrival of European traders from Russia or Britain was not a transformative event. Trading posts reached their proximity only in 1846 and 1847, integrating slowly into the well-established trade system and introducing few novel goods.

The most profound disruption came from diseases, against which the indigenous populations had little to no immunity. Estimating population losses is difficult. In 1928, James Mooney estimated that around 4,000 Native Americans inhabited the Yukon River Valley, while Alfred Kroeber suggested up to 4,700. Since the 1960s, estimates have ranged from 7,000 to 9,000. By 1895, the population was likely no higher than 2,600, though this figure may be speculative.

Determining whether the population plummeted due to epidemics, as seen elsewhere along the Pacific Northwest coast from 1775 or in Sitka by 1787, remains complex. A smallpox epidemic ravaged Alaska and the Lynn Canal from 1835 to 1839. In 1847, missionary Alexander H. Murray reported high mortality rates, particularly among women; Robert Campbell echoed this in 1851. Murray estimated that 230 Hän men traded near Fort Yukon, indicating a group of over 800 members. In 1865, crews from the Hudson’s Bay Company introduced a severe scarlet fever epidemic to the Yukon. James McDougall estimated that half the Native Americans around Fort Yukon perished.

Two factors accelerated disease spread: infected individuals, with an incubation period of one to two and a half weeks for smallpox, had time to seek refuge with relatives, or, suspecting sorcery by another tribe, launched retaliatory raids. Both actions led to widespread infections, against which shamans had no remedies. In 1865, the Hudson’s Bay Company reported that women were particularly affected and that some of the fort’s key provision hunters had died. Such epidemics often reduced populations by two-thirds. Premature deaths disrupted cultural transmission, destabilized leadership legitimacy, and undermined trust in spiritual beliefs. By the time the British and Hän interacted, the Hän’s culture was already significantly altered, and their population had declined to an uncertain extent.

=== Trade monopoly disputes: British, Russians, and Indigenous groups (from 1806) ===
==== Overview ====
Russian traders reached the lower Yukon by at least 1839–42, while British traders were active along the Mackenzie River as early as 1806. Middlemen introduced Russian and British goods to the region decades before Europeans arrived, with the Tlingit dominating trade in the west and the Gwich'in in the northeast. Firearms and glass beads were highly sought after, primarily exchanged for furs.

The Hudson’s Bay Company (HBC), facing declining prices for beaver pelts, shifted focus to rarer, more valuable furs, prompting fur traders to push further north. John Bell established a post at the Peel River, later known as Fort McPherson. However, the Gwich'in, keen to maintain their role as middlemen, resisted British expansion westward by exaggerating transport challenges and occasionally misleading or abandoning traders. In 1845, Bell hired external Indigenous scouts, who proved more effective. Despite delaying the HBC for over five years, the Gwich'in could not permanently block their advance. In 1846, the small trading post Lapierre’s House was established on the western slopes of the Richardson Mountains, followed by Fort Yukon in 1847, about 5 km above the Porcupine River’s confluence with the Yukon. Local Indigenous groups benefited from the fur trade, working for commissions and European goods, which enhanced their social standing.

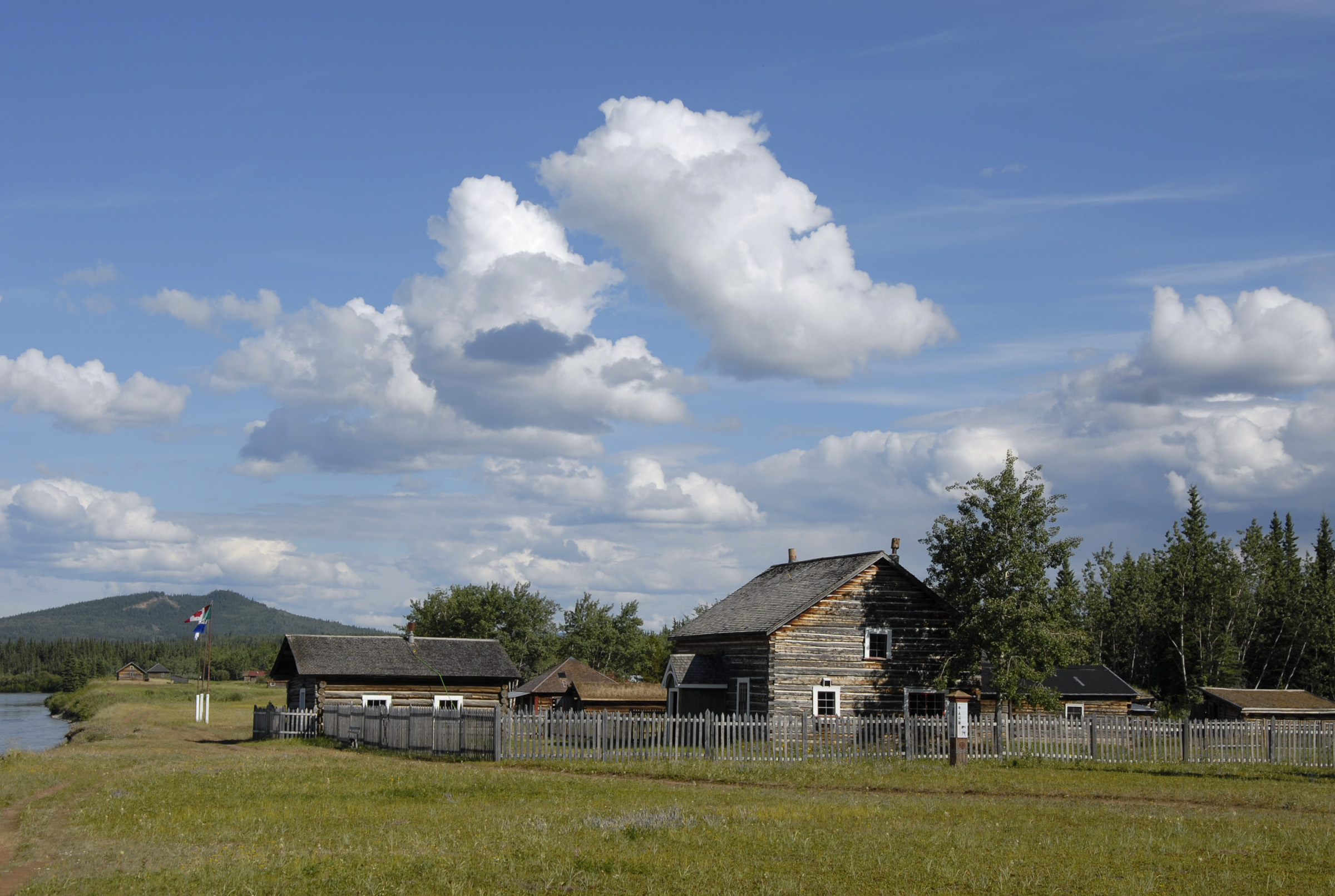
Fort Selkirk, Hudson’s Bay Company trading post, reconstruction

Concurrently, the HBC expanded from the south, with Robert Campbell establishing posts at Dease Lake, Frances Lake, and the upper Pelly River between 1838 and 1840. As he approached the Yukon River, he encountered the sophisticated trade network of the Chilkat Tlingit. In 1843, his intermediaries, reportedly frightened by tales of “savages” and alleged cannibals told by the Southern Tutchone, retreated. Nevertheless, Campbell established a post in 1848 at the confluence of the Pelly and Yukon rivers, naming it Fort Selkirk. Over the next five years, he struggled to turn a profit, though he made contact with the Hän, navigating through their territory downstream to Fort Yukon. On 19 August 1852, the Chilkat plundered and destroyed Fort Selkirk, located on an island in the Pelly River. Campbell recognised early that the Chilkat’s knowledge of terrain, customs, and languages gave them a significant advantage. The HBC’s reliance on the challenging Liard River and centrally dictated pricing, tied to the Mackenzie region, clashed with the Chilkat’s Pacific-oriented trade, aligned with Chinese markets. Consequently, the HBC abandoned the southern Yukon in favour of Fort Yukon in present-day Alaska.

The HBC also misjudged Indigenous social structures, assuming trade required agreements with prominent “trading chiefs.” However, these chiefs lacked binding authority, and Indigenous traders sold furs wherever prices were better. The HBC’s ban on credit trading further alienated them, as Indigenous groups viewed trade as a form of gift exchange tied to prestige and honour, with goods exchanged over time. In Fort Youcon, Indigenous traders successfully maintained credit-based trade, leveraging competition between the HBC and the Russian-American Company. Fearing Russian expansion upstream, the HBC sent Strachan Jones hundreds of miles down the Yukon to persuade local Indigenous groups to trade at Fort Yukon. Over time, the HBC dispatched traders downstream, eroding the Yukon Indigenous groups’ trade monopoly. These groups exploited tensions between the Mackenzie district, where the HBC held a firm monopoly, and Fort Yukon, threatening to redirect trade to secure better terms. Their nomadic lifestyle and occasional refusal to supply meat, critical for the survival of small trading posts, further strengthened their position. A trade monopoly in the Yukon proved unattainable. Following the Alaska Purchase in 1867, the discovery that Fort Yukon lay on American soil forced the HBC to abandon it in 1869, drastically reshaping trade networks.

==== First direct contacts between Hän and Europeans (from 1847) ====
The relatively adaptable Tr’ondëk kept other tribes, such as the Copper Indians in the White River district, away from their trading hubs like Forty Mile. Similarly, the Tlingit excluded the Copper Indians from Haines. Early visitors, including the North West Mounted Police in 1873, noted that these groups appeared less acculturated, possessing outdated firearms. This observation also applied to the Kaska in the southeast and the eastern Tutchone until the gold rush.

When Europeans first entered Tr’ondëk territory, their leader was Gäh St’ät, or “Rabbit Skin Hat,” whom newcomers called “Catsah”. Europeans observed that, alongside traditional trade goods like birch bark, red ochre, furs, and salmon, items such as tea, tobacco, glass beads, and metal kettles were already in use.

The first recorded contact between Europeans and the Hän occurred on April 5, 1847, when HBC trader Alexander Hunter Murray met them at LaPierre’s House on the upper Porcupine River. Their young chief brought 20 marten pelts, hoping to exchange them for a firearm. Murray called them “Gens de fou.” They carried semi-dried goose tongues, caribou hides, and pelts. Three had previously encountered Europeans, likely Russians, with whom they reportedly traded in Nulato, Alaska. Unlike the “Rat Indians” (likely Gwich'in hunting muskrats), they welcomed the planned Fort Yukon, closer to their territory.

In early August 1847, a larger group visited the fort. Murray had been warned by Gwich'in that the Hän were angry, believing a chief’s death was linked to the British arrival. Approximately 25 canoes arrived in silence, without the customary singing of other Athabascan groups. Their long hair and shirts adorned with beads and brass gave them a “wild” appearance to Murray. They brought pipes made of tin and sheet metal, which they had traded with Russians, carrying only minimal trade goods, including bear pelts, meat, and a hundred geese shot with bows. On the second day, some threatened to destroy the fort if mistreated, citing a supposed precedent with the Russians, though no evidence supports this. They demanded credit, which Murray refused.

Between 1847 and 1852, HBC employees, including Murray’s men and interpreter Antoine Hoole, traversed Han territory at least seven times, travelling downstream to Fort Yukon.

==== Border establishment of 1867, new fur trade competition, and trading posts ====
Despite early challenges, Fort Yukon remained the primary trading post for the Han until 1869. The Alaska Purchase in 1867 divided the Han’s villages by a new border. Chief Isaac, born around 1859 in Alaska from the Wolf Clan, later emerged as a leader, marrying Eliza Harper of the Crow Clan, as inter-clan marriages were customary. The couple likely led about 200 people.

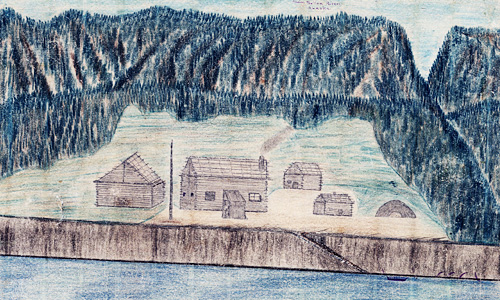
Sketch of Fort Reliance from 1884

In 1873, Moses Mercier, forced to leave Fort Yukon, established a small trading post, Belle Isle, near present-day Eagle on the Yukon’s left bank, within Hän territory. In late August 1874, Leroy Napoleon “Jack” McQuesten founded Fort Reliance, about 10 km (6.2 mi) below the Klondike River’s confluence, known to him as the “Trundeck River”. With Frank Barnfield, he built a cabin, employing Indigenous workers to cut and haul timber, while others hunted for them. McQuesten stayed for 12 years, trading for the Alaska Commercial Company. The post, measuring roughly 30 by 20 feet, hosted Hän, Upper Tanana, and Northern Tutchone, whom McQuesten called “Klondike Hän”. He introduced the Yukon, the first steamboat on the Yukon River.

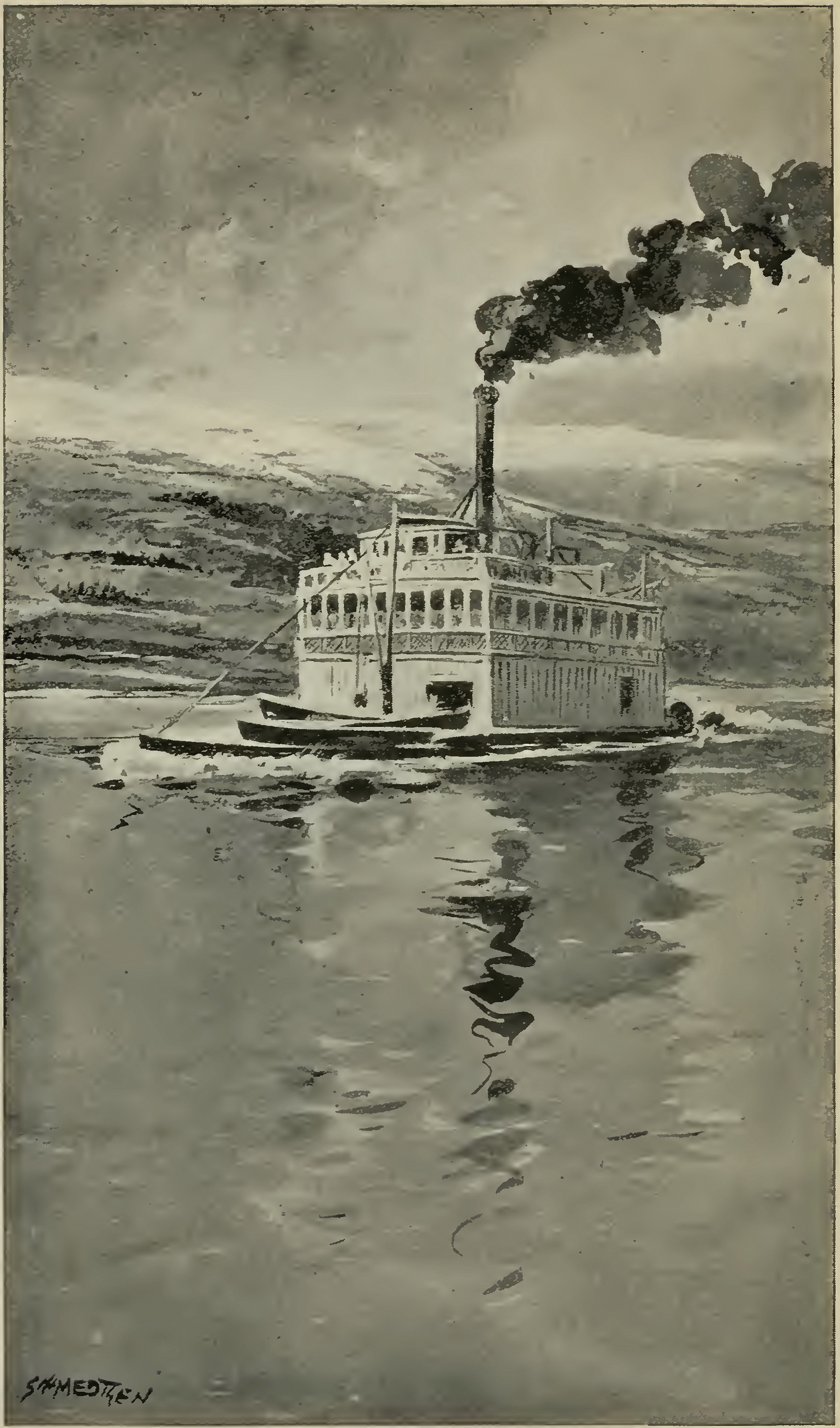
Steamboat on the Yukon River, 1897

From the west, the Alaska Commercial Company, having purchased the Russian trade monopoly in 1867 for 350,000 dollars, dominated the lower Yukon by 1874. Independent fur traders challenged this, and many indigenous groups, capitalising on competition, traded with Americans. The HBC, now permitting credit at Rampart House, hired more scouts, hunters, fishers, and interpreters, extending contracts from three to six months. However, they could no longer travel 300 km (190 mi) downstream to Nuklukayet. American competitors offered better prices, sought out remote groups, and even supplied British goods, treating indigenous traders as independent partners. They introduced a 17 m (56 ft) steamboat, significantly reducing transport costs and time.

The Alaska Purchase and the HBC’s forced withdrawal from Fort Yukon in 1869, as it lay west of the 141st meridian, intensified competition among companies. Chief Catsah had advocated for Fort Reliance’s establishment. However, the post was abandoned in 1877 or 1878 after hostilities, reportedly sparked by a tobacco theft. In 1877, three women were poisoned, one fatally, by arsenic-laced fat left to combat mice. McQuesten and the chief agreed on compensation, including a dog for the victim’s mother. The post reopened in 1878, with the Hän providing reparations for the theft.

In 1880, the North West Company established a post 130 km (81 mi) downstream at David’s Village, near Eagle. Moses Mercier abandoned this unprofitable post in 1881 but founded Belle Isle in 1882 for the Alaska Commercial Company. His former employer reopened the abandoned post, intensifying competition. By 1883, the Alaska Commercial Company absorbed its rival, raising goods prices, lowering fur prices, and restricting credit.

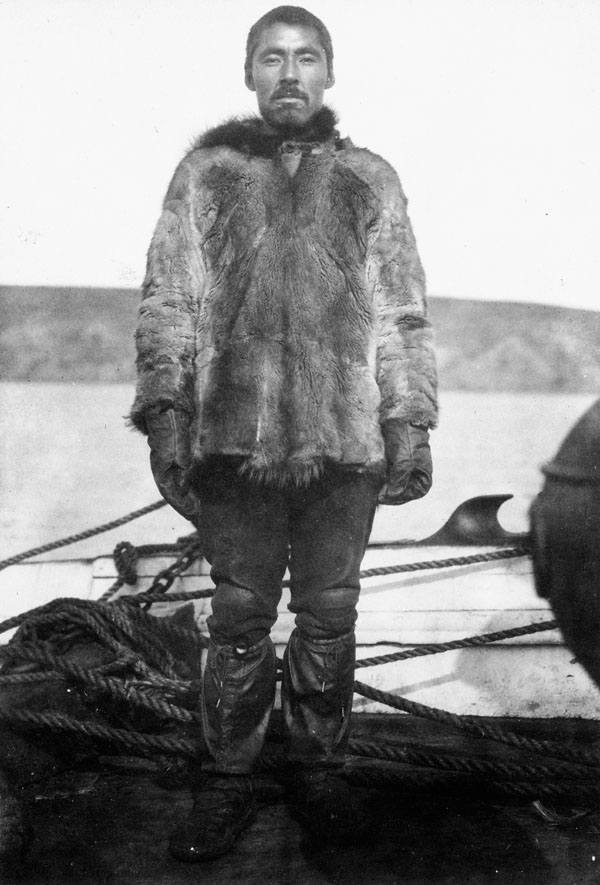
Sipadaitiak, a whaler from Herschel Island in his thirties, who was employed on the S.S. Belvedere; August 28, 1912

Americans deployed steamboats like the Yukon and, from 1879, the St Michael by the Western Fur and Trading Company. In 1887, the New Racket, built by gold prospectors and acquired by the Alaska Commercial Company, joined the fleet. These vessels introduced bulk goods like flour, repeating rifles, and tent canvas, items the HBC avoided, as well as exotic goods like Chinese teacups, strengthening the Han’s role as intermediaries. From 1889, the over 40 m (130 ft) Arctic and, during the Klondike Gold Rush, ships exceeding 70 m (230 ft), navigated the unpredictable river.

In the 1880s, whaling ships reached Herschel Island off the Beaufort Sea, introducing Winchester repeating rifles, which both Americans and British refused to sell, and alcohol.

==== Gold discoveries ====
In 1862 and 1874, gold rushes occurred in the Cassiar District, and in 1884, gold was found at the Stewart River. Campbell had already noted gold near Fort Selkirk, and Reverend Robert McDonald, stationed at Fort Yukon from 1862 to 1863, discovered gold, likely at Birch Creek. George Holt was the first to send gold from Alaska to the outside world. Some fur traders transitioned to the more lucrative gold prospecting trade. However, the barriers were significant, as prospectors often rejected Indigenous labour. The technique of gold panning—other deposits would have required greater capital, labour, and machinery—relied on minimal paid work, with prospectors themselves undertaking the task (placer mining). Moreover, European and American prospectors were highly mobile, driven by persistent rumours of new gold strikes that lured men, and a few women, from one site to another.

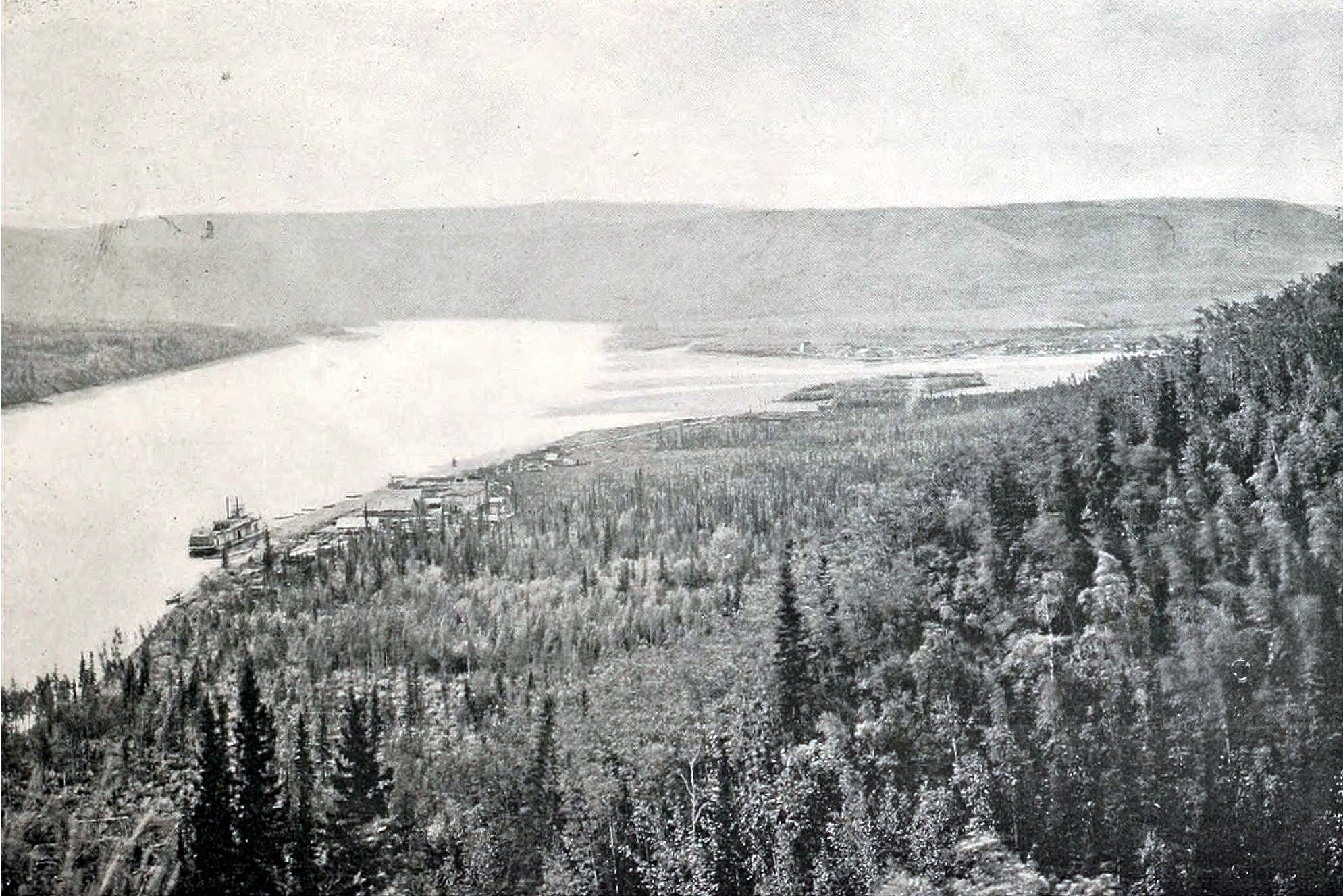
Forty Mile in 1897

In 1886, a significant gold discovery at the Fortymile River (Ch’ëdäh Dëk) attracted several hundred men to an area previously used for fishing and as a crossing point for caribou, which facilitated hunting. The Tr’ondëk Hwëch’in supplied the new settlement of Forty Mile with food and essential furs. In exchange, they received intricately crafted glass beads, metal tools, and alcohol, which they valued highly. Their leader, Chief Isaac, whose traditional name is no longer known, was the son-in-law of Gäh St’ät. McQuesten abandoned Fort Reliance in 1886 and established a new trading post at the mouth of the Stewart River. In 1894, a post was built 60 miles above Fort Reliance at the confluence of Sixtymile Creek, named after William Ogilvie, a noted historian of the Yukon gold rush.

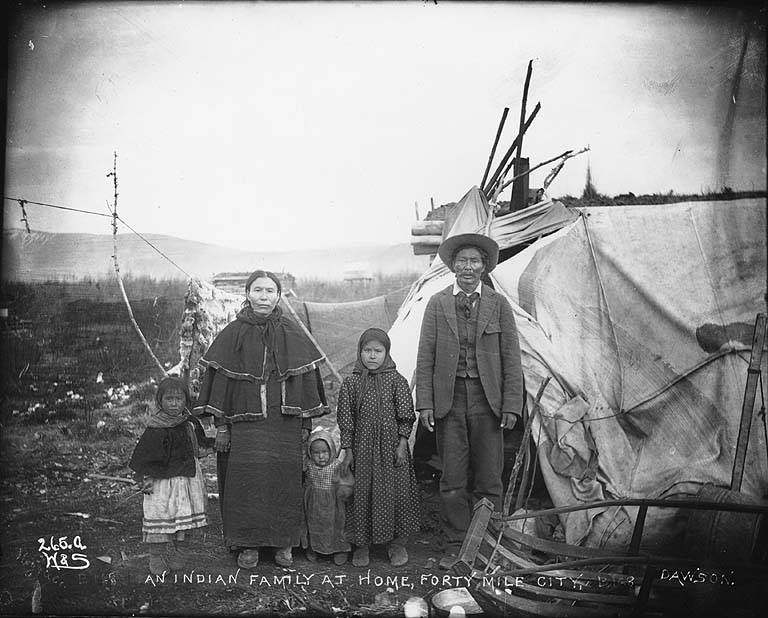
"An Indian Family at Home, Forty Mile City" (Gwich'in or Hän family), photographed around 1899

On American territory, Circle City emerged following gold discoveries at Birch Creek in 1893–94. In 1895, finds at American Creek led to the establishment of Eagle City, which temporarily hosted nearly a thousand prospectors. Fort Egbert was built there in 1899 to monitor the border. Even before the major gold rush, an estimated one to two thousand prospectors roamed the Yukon, restlessly traversing Tr’ondëk Hwëch’in territory.

Some Tr’ondëk Hwëch’in worked as porters, boat packers, or assisted with gold panning, but few acquired claims. The slim prospect of distant wages was insufficient incentive for the arduous and unhealthy work. Moreover, they had no intention of leaving their homeland, where gold held rapidly diminishing value. Successful non-Indigenous prospectors, conversely, aimed to leave the region quickly, using their earnings to fund comfortable lives in southern cities.

Wages for porters between Dawson and Forty Mile varied by season, as dog teams enabled larger and faster transport in winter, though they earned only a third of the pay. In the mines, Indigenous workers earned between 4 and 8 dollars per day, while white workers earned 6 to 10, but Indigenous workers struggled to enforce wage demands due to underlying racism. Nevertheless, Bishop William Carpenter Bompas believed Indigenous people prospered through mine work and by supplying prospectors and their sled dogs with meat and fish. Some prospectors purchased Indigenous log cabins for 100 to 200 dollars. Significant inflation was already evident, a concept unfamiliar to the Indigenous population, leading to poorly timed house sales.

=== Anglican mission and intercultural contact management (from 1862) ===
In 1862, William West Kirkby became the first missionary to visit Fort Yukon, staying briefly. In 1863, he encouraged a medicine man and four young men, selected for missionary work, to read texts with him. In the north, at Porcupine, Robert McDonald, a Métis from the Red River District, started his missionary work in 1862. Bishop Bompas arrived in the north in 1864, becoming Bishop of Athabasca in 1876. In 1890, he assumed leadership of the Selkirk diocese, later renamed Yukon, which had been carved out of the Mackenzie diocese.

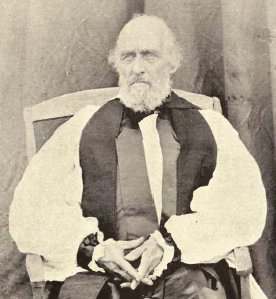
William Carpenter Bompas, Anglican Bishop of the Yukon, 1890–1906, photographed in 1896

In 1887, alongside William Ogilvie and Bernard Moore, archdeacon Robert McDonald arrived in the region. That year, Anglican missionary J. W. Ellington established Buxton Mission on Mission Island above Forty Mile but abandoned it two years later due to ill health.

In 1891, Bishop William Carpenter Bompas visited the region, returning the following year with his wife, Charlotte Selina. Except for a year (1899–1900) spent in Moosehide, he remained in Forty Mile (Buxton) until 1901.

Bompas sought to shield the Hän, whom he considered "the lowest of all peoples", from alcohol consumption, sexual contact with predominantly male fur traders and prospectors, and other harmful influences. After concluding trade, these groups held celebrations involving heavy drinking, which often led to sexual encounters with Indigenous women. Recognising that such events attracted white men, the Han began constructing a dance hall on Mission Island. Bompas purchased the partially built structure and converted it into a church. The Hudson’s Bay Company (HBC), however, encouraged such contacts for lower-ranking employees, believing marriage to Indigenous women would retain young men in the region. Higher-ranking employees were explicitly discouraged from such unions. For instance, Alexander Hunter Murray brought his non-Indigenous wife to Fort Yukon in 1847, while Governor George Simpson warned Robert Campbell against complicating his life with an Indigenous wife.

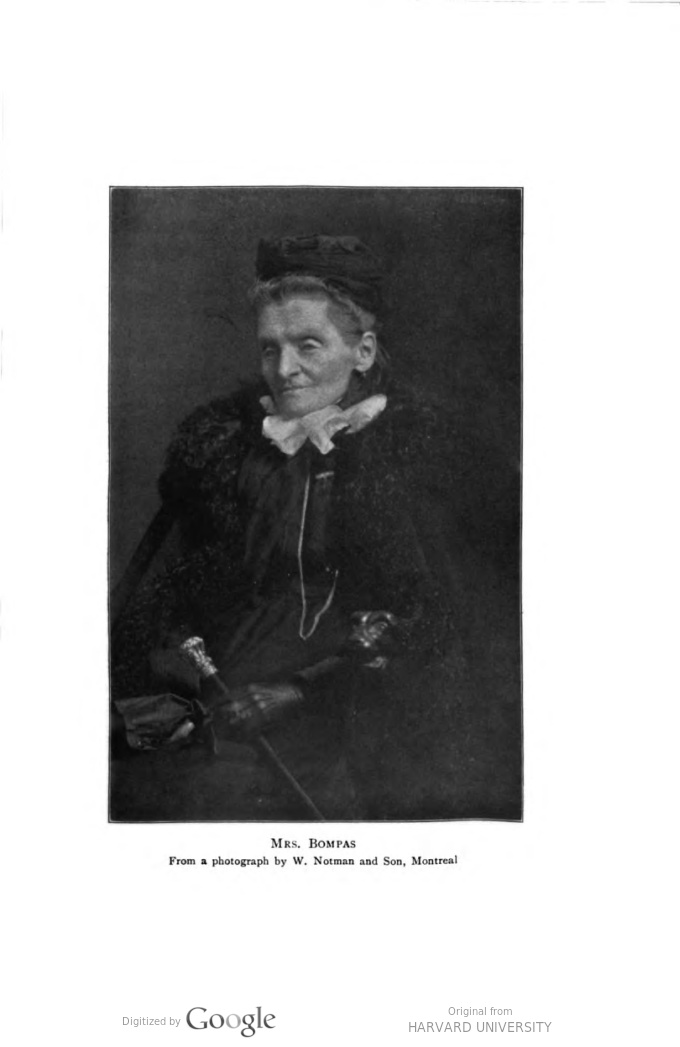
Charlotte Selina, Bompas's wife

Bompas established a school and, from 1895, supported the presence of 19 members of the North-West Mounted Police under Charles Constantine. Fort Constantine was built at Forty Mile, and the mission station on Mission Island was revived. A key objective was racial segregation.

Bompas advocated for a strict alcohol ban, as he believed excessive drinking occurred during brief encounters between prospectors and Hän. Since Europeans only saw Indigenous people at such events, they assumed intemperate behaviour was typical, leading to a general prohibition. The police imposed fines of up to over 100 dollars on traders selling alcohol to Indigenous people. However, these restrictions inadvertently brought together moonshiners, smugglers, fur traders, prospectors, and Indigenous people, fostering alcohol abuse. Missionaries and police, anticipating increased violence and driven by puritanical fears of sexual contact, were wary of such gatherings. For white men, these events often served as opportunities for sexual encounters with Hän women, hindered by cultural barriers, including limited communication and unfamiliarity, as well as the scarcity of women. Such contacts were typically fleeting, as most white men feared being labelled "squaw men." Children from these unions usually remained with the Han, primarily with their mothers, and rarely with their fathers.

=== Klondike Gold Rush from 1896, Chief Isaac, Moosehide ===
==== Economic and political context ====
In Canada, global gold supply shortages triggered extensive prospecting efforts, yielding discoveries every few years from around 1858.

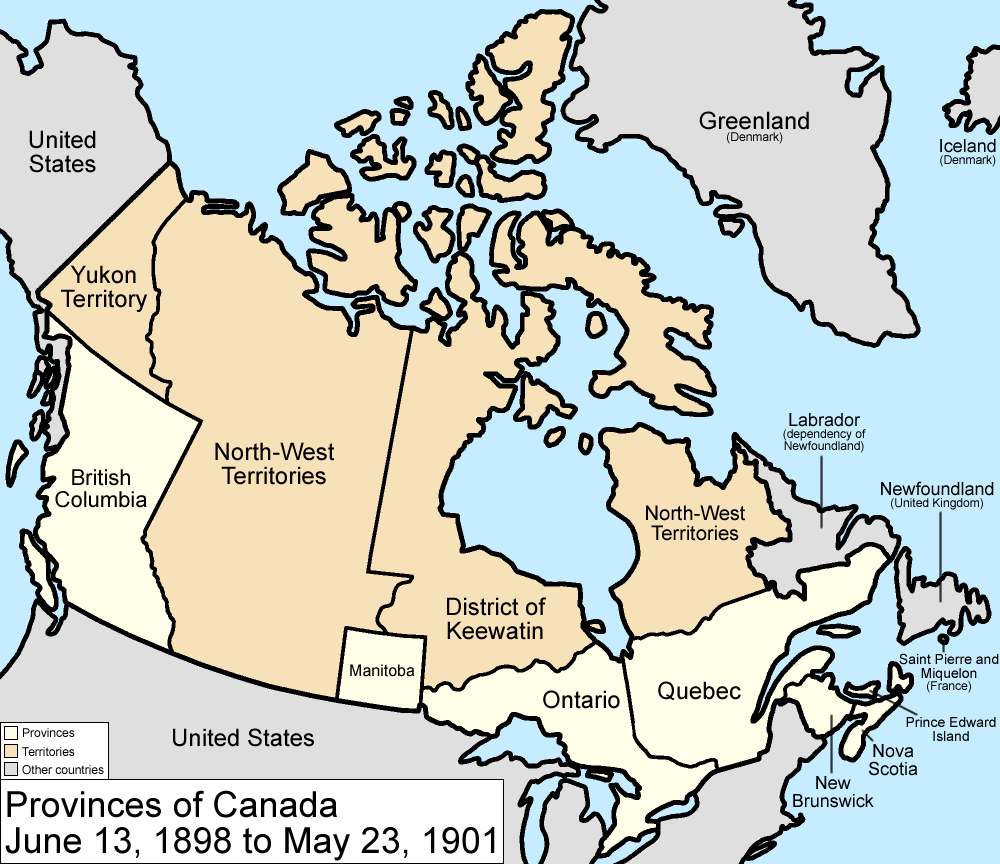
The Canadian provinces and territories in 1898

These early gold finds sparked a massive migration to the sparsely populated and difficult-to-access Yukon region. This held significant political importance for Canada, as most prospectors were American. In 1867, the United States purchased Alaska from Russia. The influx of prospectors not only outnumbered Indigenous populations but also the British, who had established Canada in 1867 to counter U.S. northward expansion. In 1898, Canada designated the Yukon as a separate territory and deployed a small police force.

Some prospectors arrived via Alaska, which dominated the Pacific coast and offered easier access to the Klondike than Canadian ports. Controlling the long border along the 141st meridian was practically impossible, and prospectors in the Yukon were often unaware or indifferent to whether they were in U.S. or Canadian territory.

In the United States, economic turmoil followed the Panic of 1893 and 1896. When the Portland docked in Seattle on 17 July 1897, carrying the first successful prospectors, approximately 5,000 onlookers urged the passengers to display their gold, which they did to a cheering crowd. The Seattle Post-Intelligencer’s "Klondike Edition" reported under the headline Gold! Gold! Gold! Gold! and Sixty-Eight Rich Men on the Steamer Portland, detailing gold worth 700,000 dollars.

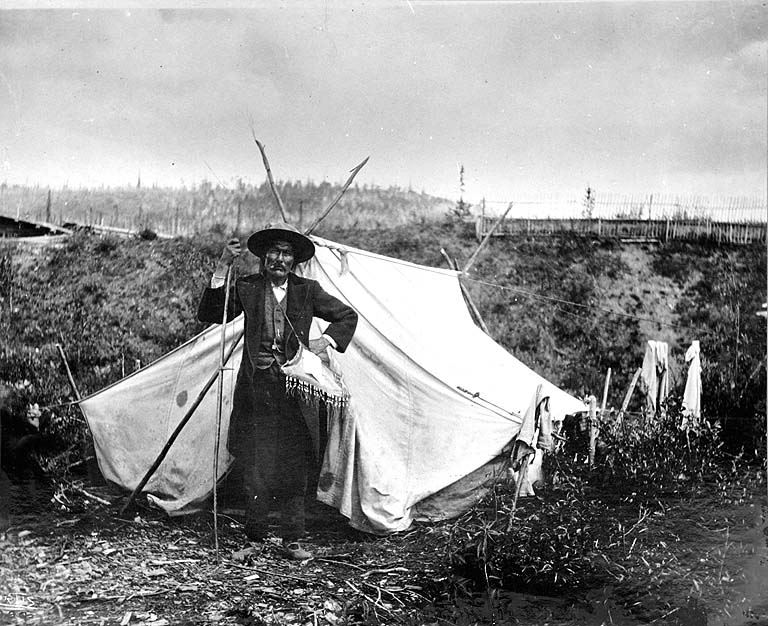
Chief Isaac, 1898

==== Chief Isaac and Moosehide ====
In 1894, about 1,000 gold prospectors lived in the Yukon. The Klondike Gold Rush, starting in 1896, brought over 100,000 white settlers to the region. Dawson, the largest gold rush town, emerged directly across the northern riverbank from the Tr’ondëk village of Tr’ochëk, reaching a peak population of over 40,000. By 1901, Indigenous peoples made up just over 10% of the Yukon Territory’s population.

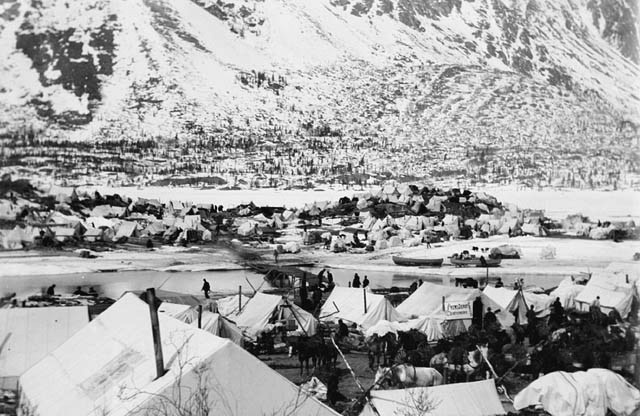
Gold prospectors' camp

Before the gold rush, Tr’ochëk was the summer camp of Chief Isaac, leader of the Tr’ondëk Hwëch’in. Born in an Alaskan village, (Note: It is unclear whether Isaac came from the upper Tanana region, Ketchumstock, Tanacross, or Chena.) part of the United States since 1867, Isaac grew up in Eagle Village and the Forty Mile area. In 1892, he met Bishop William Bompas, was baptized, and often attended Anglican Church services while upholding his cultural traditions. He traveled to potlatch ceremonies in Fort Selkirk, Forty Mile, and Eagle, including one in 1915 after the death of Chief Jackson of the Selkirk First Nation. Isaac inherited a watch from Bompas, gifting Bompas’s successor his grandfather’s stone hunting knife in return. A profound change occurred in 1897. Anglican missionary Frederick Flewelling, returning to the once-quiet Tr’ochëk on May 29, 1897, after a winter trip to Forty Mile, noted, “Five or six hundred men have come here this spring alone, and their tents are scattered everywhere”. Speculators had bought much of the Hän’s land, leaving them uncertain about winter shelter. Flewelling purchased a 40-acre tract two miles downstream, proposing to relocate the Hän there and establish a mission.

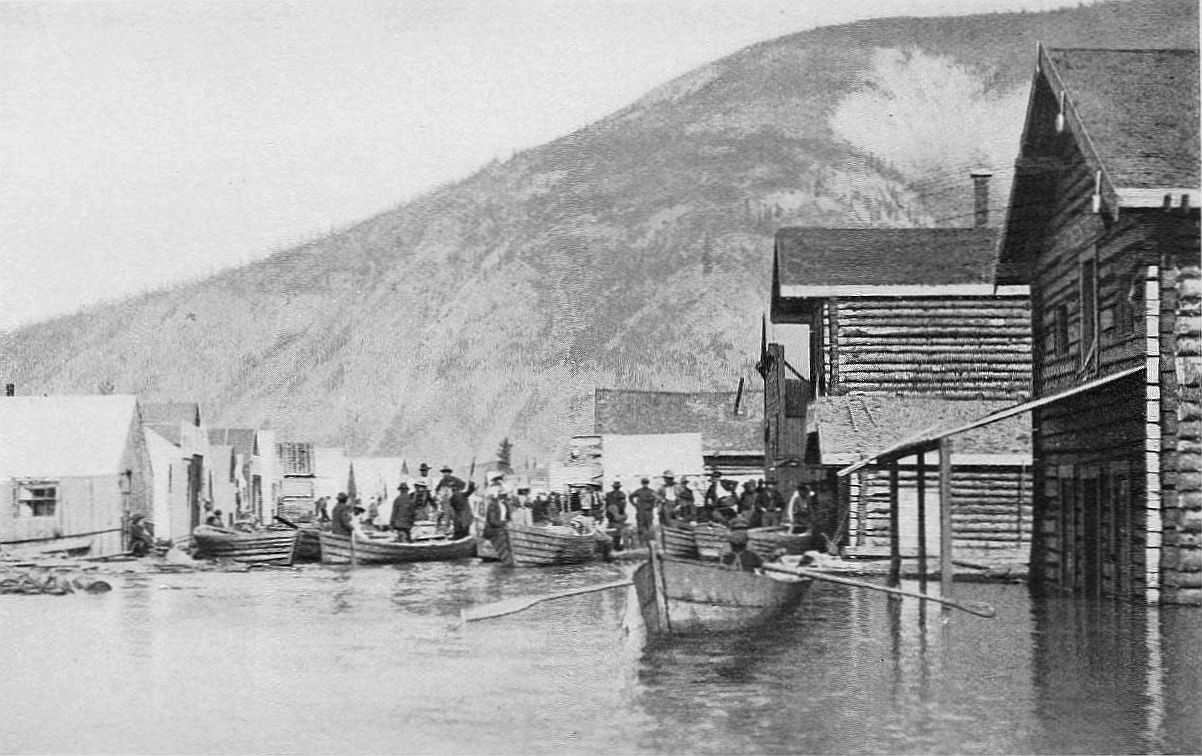
Spring flooding of Dawson's main street, 1899

However, Hän elders’ accounts reveal that Chief Isaac and his people took charge of their fate, welcoming the newcomers despite finding their gold obsession baffling. Isaac observed the settlers’ lavish spending of gold, remarked on its abundance, and worried about the adverse effects of contact. He proposed relocating to Moosehide, a decision later confirmed by his daughter’s testimony.

==== Population decline ====
Introduced diseases, as in the past, were catastrophic. Between 1901 and 1911, the Indigenous population in the Yukon Territory dropped from 3,322 to 1,489, a decline of over half. The Hän faced similar hardships. Dawson’s chaotic atmosphere and prospectors drove away game, while settlers depleted the region’s scarce timber for building and fuel. Rafts and boats damaged Hän fish traps, and smoke filled the air as prospectors burned underbrush and felled charred trees. The Tr’ondëk Hwëch’in also suffered from diseases like tuberculosis, against which they had little resistance. Chief Isaac feared moral decay and growing dependency but maintained a fragile peace. He learned English and gave public lectures.

His authority was evident each morning when he was the first to leave his house, waking the village with a loud call and announcing where to hunt or where the band would move. At Christmas 1902, every villager gathered outside his home to exchange gifts with him.

==== Moosehide and Dawson (from 1896) ====
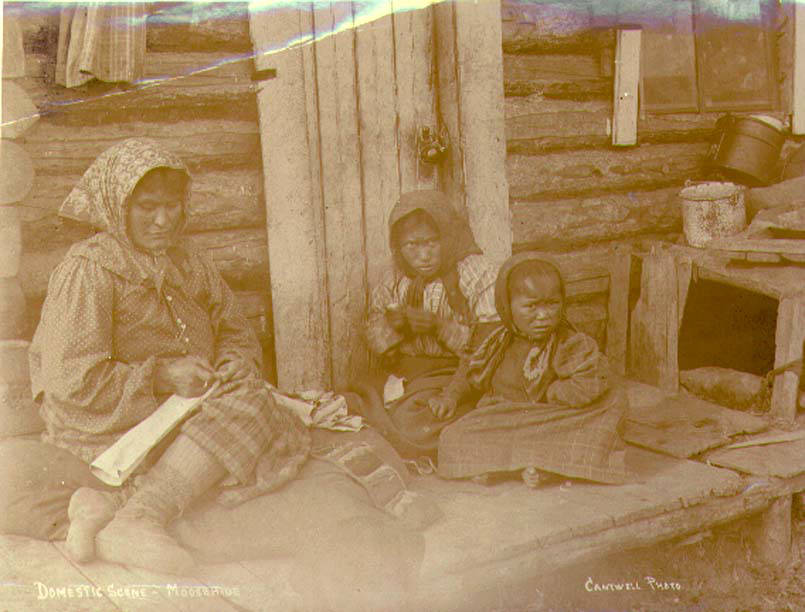
Woman processing hides outside her cabin with her children, Moosehide, circa 1900

To avoid conflict, starting in fall 1896, the Hän negotiated with church and government representatives, therefore Bishop William Bompas and Inspector Charles Constantine. They initially moved from Tr’ochëk to the Mounted Police reserve across the river but found it too close to Dawson. In spring 1897, they relocated a few kilometers downstream to Moosehide, selected for its fresh water from a creek, available timber, trails to hunting grounds, and suitability for salmon fishing. The Hän sold meat to prospectors and found work on paddlewheel steamers, in lumber operations, or at the docks.

Chief Isaac safeguarded cultural artifacts, especially songs and stories, by entrusting them to relatives in Alaska, with whom he maintained close ties. In 1907, he celebrated a potlatch in Eagle with Chief Alex.

Twelve Mile, or Tthedëk, emerged during the Klondike Gold Rush when some families, led by Charlie Adams and his wife, chose not to move to Moosehide. These ten or more families had stronger ties to Alaskan groups than to those near Dawson, 30 km (19 mi) upstream. A flood in 1957 destroyed the remaining homes, forcing the settlement’s abandonment.

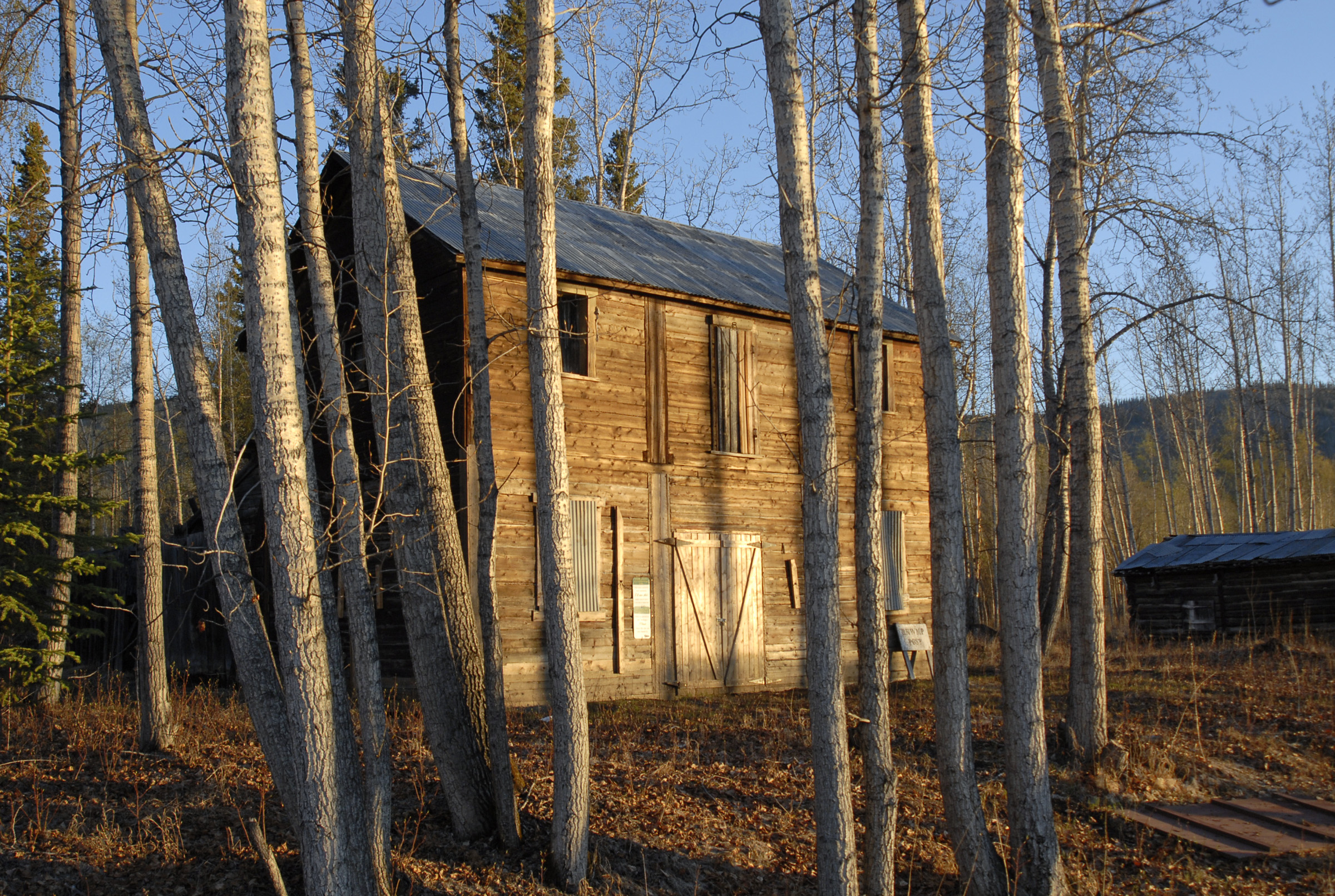
Police force building in Forty Mile

In spring 1898, after newspapers spread news of the gold rush globally, tens of thousands of prospectors, known as Stampeders, flooded Dawson. By May, Tr’ochëk was overtaken by newcomers, giving rise to Lousetown, also called Klondike City, where many prostitutes settled. Archaeologists identified 72 cabin platforms along the island’s steep slope, reinforced with stone blocks. Other settlers built simple tents supported by wooden frames, leaving few traces. Garbage and wastewater flowed downhill into the river. On March 27, 1900, the government established a reserve at Moosehide. That year, food scarcity was so severe that Inspector Z.T. Wood of the North West Mounted Police provided flour, rice, and tea to support the 10 to 12 most affected individuals.

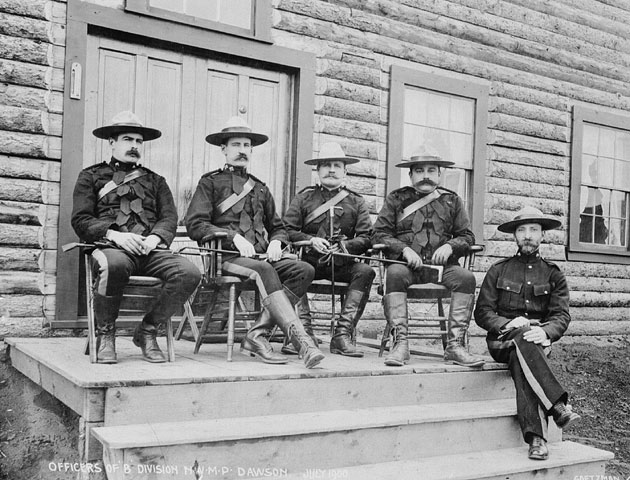
Police in Dawson, July 1900

Chief Isaac maintained good relations with Dawson. His wife, Eliza Harper, shared a close friendship with Klondike Kate (Kathleen Rockwell), a famous gold rush dancer who married prospector Johnny Matson and lived in Bend, Oregon, until her death in 1957. They exchanged numerous letters, with Kate sending Eliza clothes, addressing her as “Mrs. Chief Isaac.” Eliza, who died in 1960 at age 87, bore 13 children, only four of whom reached adulthood: Patricia Lindgren, Angela Lopaschuck, Charlie, and Fred Isaac. These children played key roles in preserving oral traditions and, for the sons, in the band’s political and religious organization. In 1906, Isaac’s eldest son, Edward, died of tuberculosis. From 1913, his eight-year-old son Fred and seven other Moosehide children attended the Choutla School in Carcross, opened in 1911. The school operated until the early 1960s but burned down in 1939, allowing Moosehide children to be taught at home from 1948 to 1957. In 1920, St. Paul’s Hostel was built for children of mixed marriages, operating until 1952.

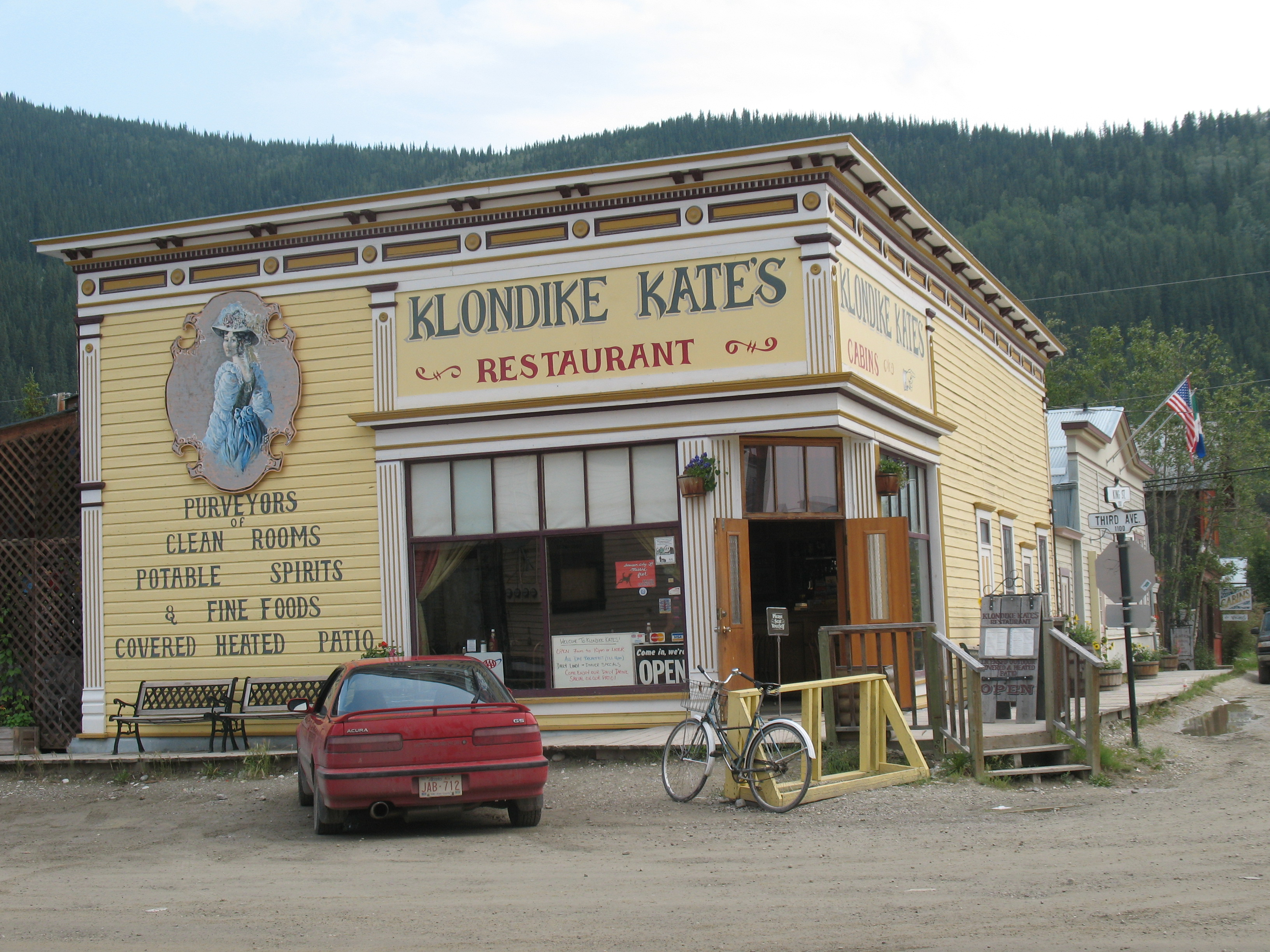
Kathleen Rockwell’s restaurant, known as “Klondike Kate,” in Dawson, 2009

In 1901, Chief Isaac, with his brother Walter Benjamin and medicine man Little Paul, visited friend Jack McQuesten, a longtime Yukon gold prospector. They traveled on the steamship Sarah down the Yukon to St. Michael, then to Seattle, San Francisco, and Berkeley, California, as guests of the Alaska Commercial Company, touring gold rush towns along the way.

Between 1904 and 1919, Isaac secured four claims, not to mine gold but to protect the Moosehide settlement. In 1905, the Yukon Territorial Council feared drought would halt gold mining and hired rainmaker Charlie Hatfield for $10,000. When little rain fell, Isaac offered to hire four medicine men for $5,000 to show Hatfield how to make rain.

==== Reserve boundaries and conflicts ====
On December 15, 1911, Chief Isaac told the Dawson Daily News: “All Yukon belong to my papas. All Klondike belong my people. Country now all mine. Long time all mine. Hills all mine; moose all mine; rabbits all mine; gold all mine. White man come and take all my gold. Take millions, take hundreds fifty millions, and blow’em in Seattle. Now Moosehide Injun want Christmas. Game is gone. White man kills all moose and caribou near Dawson, which is owned by Moosehide. Injun everywhere have own hunting grounds. Moosehides hunt up Klondike, up Sixtymile, up Twentymile, but game is all gone. White man kill all.” He asserted that the Klondike had long belonged to his people, including its hills, caribou, moose, rabbits, and gold. White settlers had taken gold worth $150 million, squandering it in Seattle. Now, as Christians, the Hän faced a vanished game population, with settlers killing all moose and caribou around Dawson and in his band’s hunting grounds. He accepted gold mining but condemned the destruction of their livelihood.

Resources dwindled, and hunting required greater effort and longer absences. Steamships and furnaces consumed Dawson’s forests, prompting Isaac to seek protection for a woodland area to meet his band’s needs. In 1907, through missionary Benjamin Totty, he requested a forest reserve at Moosehide Creek. By the late 1920s, however, the reserve was reduced to favor loggers, as officials deemed the timber of little use to the Hän.

==== Church ====
Missionary Benjamin Totty, recruited by Bompas, worked in Moosehide until 1926. In 1908, St. Barnabas Church was built in Bompas’s memory. Jonathon Wood, an Indigenous catechist, also served there.

==== First village council and Isaac's death (1921–1932) ====
In March 1921, Moosehide residents elected their first council, led by Esau Harper as chairman, with Chief Isaac as deputy chairman. James Woods served as secretary, Sam Smith as "Inside Guard," David Robert as children's overseer, Tom Young and David Taylor as house overseers, James Thompson as village inspector for the north end, and Peter Thompson for the south end. The council's duties included keeping the village clean, caring for the sick and elderly, enforcing school attendance, regulating relationships between men and women, and imposing fines, including for alcohol abuse.

In its first meeting, the council banned young women from associating with non-Natives and prohibited non-Natives from entering the reserve. Children were required to attend school and be in bed by 9 p.m. All Native residents had to leave Dawson by 8 p.m., and women traveling alone by 7 p.m., unless accompanied by a married woman. Men could only stay overnight in Dawson with a companion. Men were responsible for providing wood and water for their families, and passing chewing tobacco—likely as a preventive measure—was banned. Dogs were prohibited inside homes, and non-Natives were restricted to visiting Moosehide only for business.

These strict measures faced resistance, leading the council to rely more on persuasion than punishment and to significantly reduce interference in family matters.

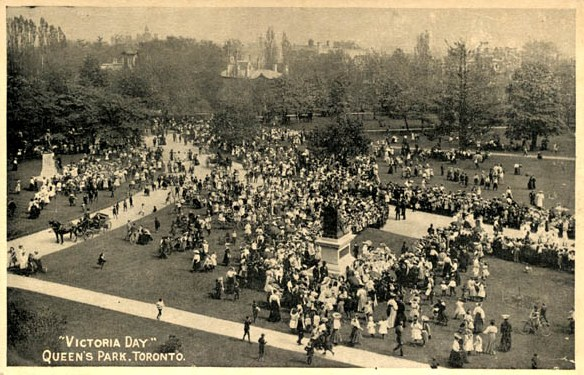
Victoria Day celebrations in Toronto, 1910

Indian Agent Hawskley viewed the Moosehide council as an experiment but resisted suggestions from Ottawa to make it permanent.

Chief Isaac led the band until his death on April 9, 1932, and was made an honorary member of the Yukon Order of Pioneers. He gave numerous speeches, such as on Victoria Day, celebrated elaborately in major cities, and Discovery Day. A frequent guest in Dawson society, Isaac often reminded attendees that they were guests on his land and criticized their overhunting of game. He even urged them to refrain from hunting and fishing, just as the Tr’ondëk abstained from gold prospecting. Isaac died at 73 from influenza, and his body was transported by a horse-drawn cart over the ice to Moosehide, where his funeral was attended by all local Native residents and many from Dawson.

==== Succession (1932 – c. 1960) ====
In December 1935, the council met with Indian Agent G. Binning to discuss possibly removing Isaac’s successor, Chief Charlie Isaac, due to frequent absences. However, Charlie Isaac was reinstated, only to be replaced by Chief John Jonas in January 1936. Charlie Isaac served in the Canadian Army from 1939 to 1945, stationed in Vancouver and Victoria, and died on February 25, 1975. His brother Fred died seven years earlier, while his sisters, Princess Patricia, who went blind early, and Angela, lived until 1991 and 1993, respectively, serving as key sources of oral history.

James (Jimmie) Wood, a Choutla School graduate from Carcross, became chief around 1940. An Anglican catechist and assistant teacher in Moosehide, he served in a local patrol during the war and later supported a housing program. After a decade of illness, he died of tuberculosis in 1956. Happy Jack Lesky served as deputy chief.

Chief Jonas, aged 78, succeeded him but was the last of the "Moosehide Chiefs". By 1961, only seven families remained in Moosehide: four Hän, two Peel River Gwich'in, and one of mixed descent.

=== Eagle: The Hän in Alaska ===
Significant changes also affected the Hän relatives in Alaska. In May 1898, 28 Americans purchased land at Mission Creek, and within months, the population grew to 1,700, with over 500 log cabins built. Fort Egbert was established in 1899 to oversee the area and border. Oral accounts indicate the army barred the Hän from living in their traditional area. Chief Philip, whose home was filled with Hudson’s Bay Company blankets and prized beads, persuaded his band to relocate three miles away to his cabin’s location, leaving their burial grounds behind.

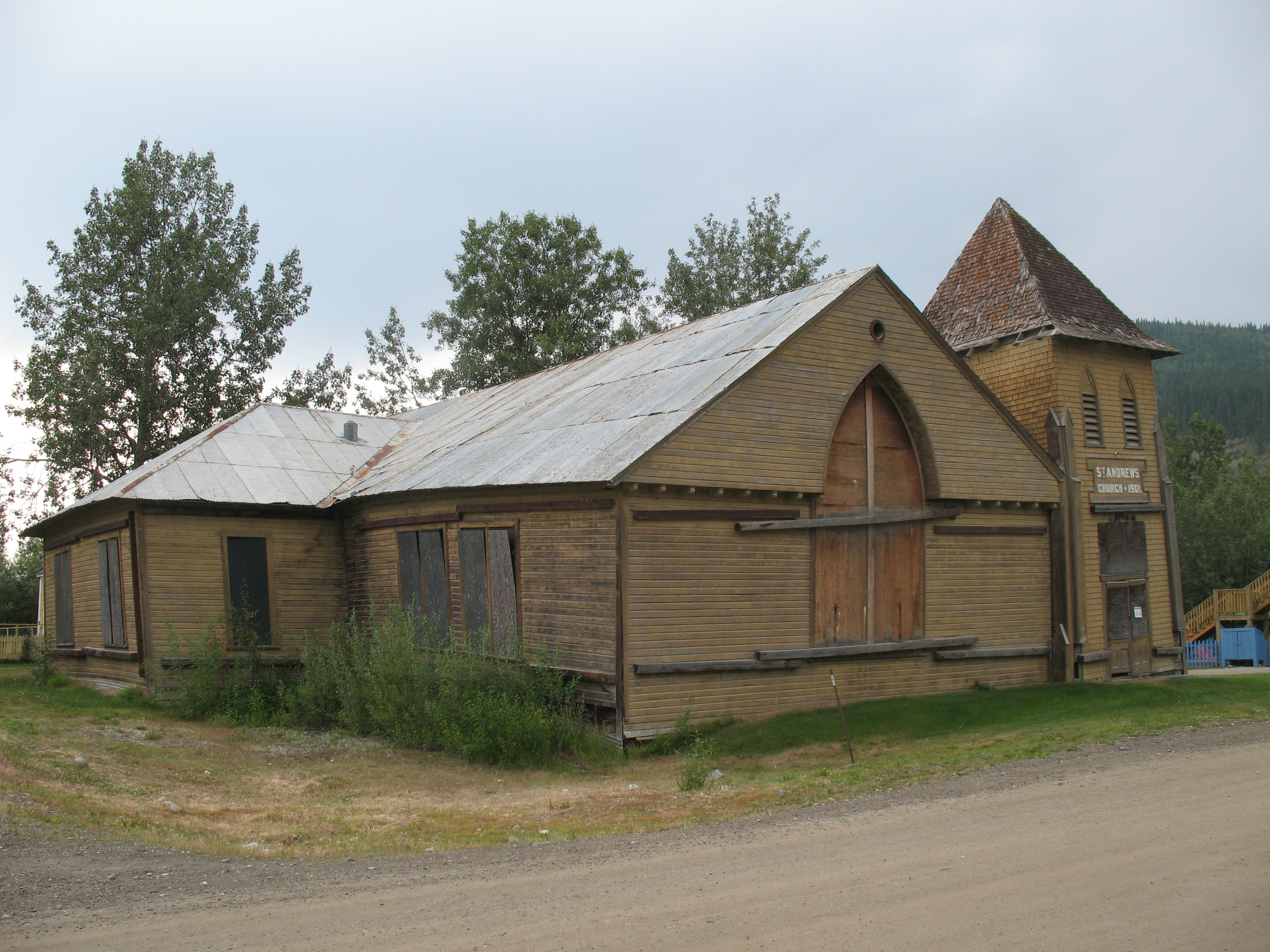
St. Andrews, Presbyterian Church in Dawson, Hans-Jürgen Hübner, 2009

In the summer of 1898, the first Episcopal Bishop of Alaska, Peter Trimble Rowe, selected a site for a church, but by the next year, Eagle City was occupied by the army. With Catholics and Presbyterians also active, Rowe focused on Eagle Village, where the Hän had relocated. St. Paul’s Mission was built between 1905 and 1906, and in 1925, Walter Benjamin was appointed lay preacher, assisting the local missionary until 1946. George Burgess, a missionary in the village from 1909 to 1920, sought to limit the influence of non-Natives, particularly soldiers from Fort Egbert, by ending dances. Every male over 12 was required to join a temperance society for a one-dollar entry fee and 25 cents monthly, pledging a year of sobriety. Unlike in Moosehide or Dawson, the Hän could not purchase alcohol in Eagle City.

A day school for Hän children opened in Eagle City in 1902, followed by an Episcopal Church day school in Eagle Village in 1905, where the teacher enforced English-only instruction with physical discipline. Health conditions were poor, with tuberculosis, respiratory, and digestive diseases widespread. As one elder later recalled, “there was no medicine.” The nearest hospital was in Fort Yukon or Dawson, and the number of children who died from these illnesses remains unknown.

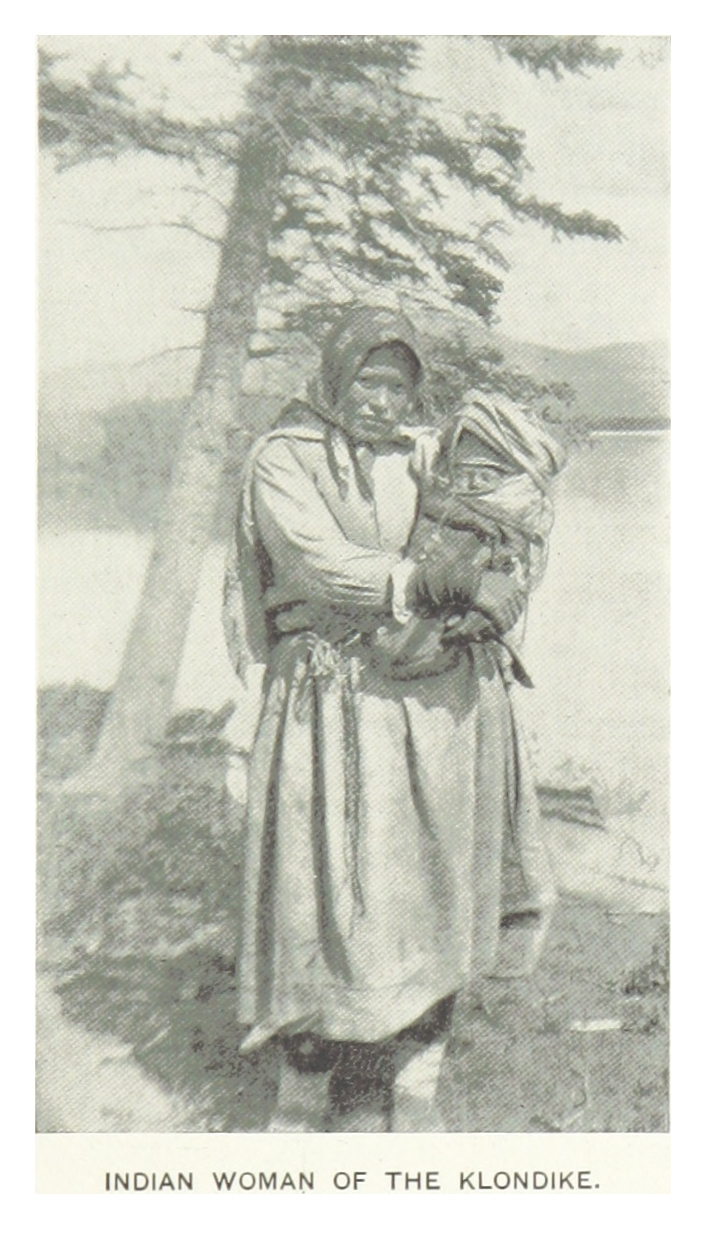
“Indian Woman of the Klondike,” 1899

=== Rise of the money economy ===
The money economy arrived abruptly in Dawson and along travel routes but only gradually replaced barter and gift-based exchanges. The Native population supplied Forty Mile with food and furs from 1886, receiving glass beads, metal tools, and occasionally alcohol, but rarely money.

In spring 1894, Inspector Constantine and Sergeant Brown were sent to the Yukon to collect fees and taxes. During and after the Klondike Gold Rush, money primarily circulated between traders and prospectors. As unsuccessful prospectors left, prices for abandoned equipment dropped. Many turned to wage labor as miners or offered services to claim holders.

Joseph Ladue established a sawmill, warehouse, and saloon at the Klondike and Yukon confluence in August 1896. From 1898 to 1899, a commercial district with shops and warehouses developed in Dawson, on which all residents depended, especially during the six months when the city was inaccessible by ship, halting the flow of goods and money.

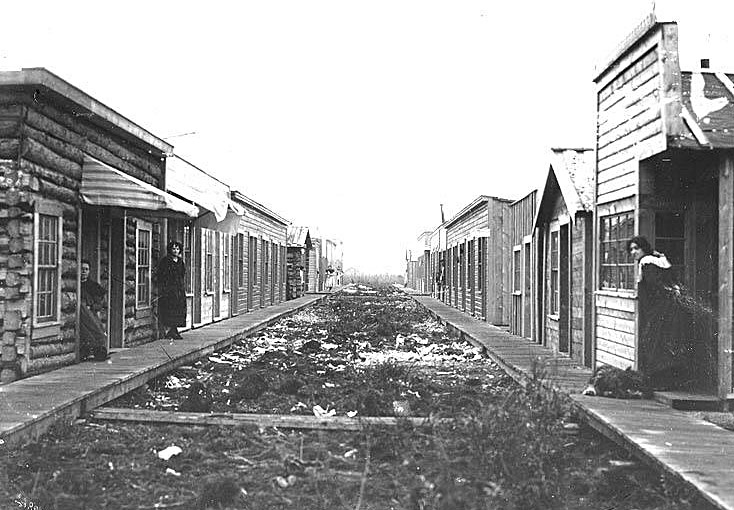
Prostitutes in Lousetown, 1899

With the arrival of women and families, demand for laundry services and prostitution decreased. In May 1899, women in prostitution were forced out of Dawson’s core to a district between Fourth and Fifth Avenues. By 1901, they were relocated further to Klondike City, also known as Lousetown, where the Tr’ond¨k Hwëch’in had lived until 1896.

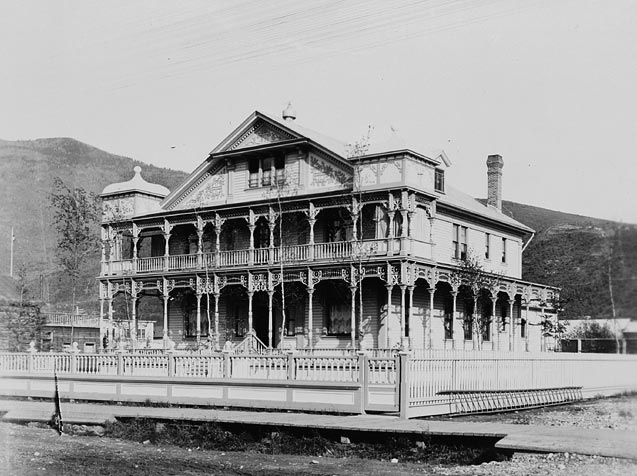
Commissioner's residence

The Commissioner’s residence was badly damaged by fire in 1906, signaling the end of Dawson’s boom. The Tr’ondëk Hwëch’in, who had participated in the fur trade competition between the Tlingit and Hudson’s Bay Company and the brief American-dominated free trade, initially earned money as porters, sled dog drivers, hunters, fishers, or packers. However, they were caught between monopolistic regions around Fort Yukon and the Chilkat in the southwest.

The gold rush erupted in their territory, offering seasonal work that aligned with their traditional lifestyle. New goods and rising prices, however, increased reliance on paid labor and reduced subsistence work. As long as competing laborers were scarce, the Tr’ondëk accessed the capitalist job market. The greed for gold and mass immigration disrupted this balance. In 1896, four of five Yukon residents were Native; by 1901, only one in nine was. Infrastructure development, particularly railroads, reduced porter jobs. Government mandates requiring prospectors to bring their own equipment increased wage labor for carrying but diminished food provisioning opportunities. Many failed prospectors turned to hunting, competing with Native provisioners. Demand for sled dogs led some to acquire and sell them at a profit in Dawson. Steamships offered low-skill jobs, and some Gwich’in, like the “Dawson Boys” from the north, worked as pilots, laborers, carpenters, mechanics, or licensed traders. Women worked in laundries or as cooks in camps. Men often worked seasonally, resuming traditional migrations and winter lifestyles, creating a mixed economy rooted in their traditional practices.

Women supplied the market with clothing, sleds, and snowshoes. Some Native women visited prospectors’ homes in Forty Mile and Dawson, but white competition dominated even prostitution, unlike other gold rush areas.

Bishop Bompas secured welfare benefits for impoverished Native groups, though only those along the Bennett-Dawson corridor near police stations benefited. As gold mining industrialized, the market for unskilled labor shrank, requiring skills the Native population lacked, with little access to technical training. Pre-industrial mindsets and lifestyles persisted. The Klondike Gold Rush split the economy into resource extraction and traditional activities like hunting, trapping, fishing, and gathering. Initial overlaps diminished over time.

=== Economic marginalization, Great Depression, and Alaska Highway (c. 1905–1960) ===
After 1905, the Tr’ondëk Hwëch’in were largely excluded from the Yukon's economic development, which was driven by large resource companies that no longer relied on individual gold prospectors. In 1923, three major firms merged to form the Yukon Consolidated Gold Corporation. The number of prospectors in the territory plummeted, and significant gold discoveries became rare. Instead, copper mines opened near Whitehorse, and silver mines were established in Mayo and Keno City. Some Indigenous individuals, such as Sam Smith and Big Lake Jim, worked as prospectors and made finds at Little Atlin. The growing fleet of river steamships, primarily used for transporting resources, provided opportunities for Indigenous people to sell firewood along the rivers. Hunting around Dawson also remained a source of income. In 1904, the city, with a population of just 9,000, required approximately 2,300 caribou and 600 moose.

Legislative changes, over which Indigenous people had little influence, marginalized them in various industries across the Yukon. In 1923, a law excluded Indigenous people from the small but significant role of hunting guides, primarily in the southern and eastern Yukon. They were restricted to working as assistant guides or camp laborers, barred from serving as chief guides. By 1941, there were only three chief guides, and the sector did not grow significantly until the 1950s.

Unlike much of Canada, the Yukon's fur trade experienced a revival. In 1921, there were 27 trading posts operated by 18 companies or individuals. By 1930, at its peak, there were 46 posts run by 30 entrepreneurs, with 11 owned by Taylor and Drury. The market value of furs fluctuated dramatically, ranging from 23,000 in 1933 to over 600,000 dollars annually between 1944 and 1946. Many hunters fell into heavy debt. From 1923 to 1929, the territorial government imposed a 100 dollar fee to deter non-Yukon residents from hunting, but this disadvantaged Gwich’in living outside the Yukon while benefiting the Vuntut Gwitchin, the only Gwich’in group within the territory.

Many Tr’ondëk Hwëch’in enlisted in the military, including twelve men from Eagle Village. Others moved to southern Yukon to work on the Alaska Highway, constructed starting in 1942 by the United States in anticipation of a Japanese invasion. Over 30,000 workers, mostly from the U.S., were involved. The Canol Pipeline project also created numerous jobs. In 1942, a labor shortage in the mines led companies to hire Indigenous workers, but many left in the fall to hunt, a necessity for survival. Indigenous workers also feared contracting diseases introduced by southern workers, which had previously devastated communities like Champagne, now nearly a ghost town.

The fur market in the U.S. and western Canada collapsed in 1947 and 1948, affecting the Hän. In 1950, Yukon introduced traplines, a system established in British Columbia in 1926, to reserve specific areas for Indigenous hunting and reduce non-Indigenous competition. However, fees and the inheritance of trapping rights through the male line, contrary to traditional matrilineal practices, caused disputes and ultimately allowed non-Indigenous hunters to encroach further.

This increased reliance on Canadian welfare, which had expanded during the war and reached Yukon’s Indigenous communities by around 1955. Underemployment and dependency contributed to growing alcohol issues. The construction of the Taylor Highway from 1953 to 1955 facilitated alcohol access in Eagle Village. In 1964, it voted to ban alcohol sales, a decision still in effect today. The population continued to decline, dropping from 64 in 1966 to 24 in 1997, though it rose to 30 (or 68 as a census-designated place) by 2000.

The Moosehide school closed in 1957, prompting most residents to relocate to Dawson. Reverend Martin, the last permanent resident, left Moosehide in 1962. In Dawson, the Tr’ondëk Hwëch’in had no reserve protection and settled in family clusters. The city’s population had shrunk so significantly that police presence was minimal, decreasing from 96 Mounted Police officers in 1904 to just 3 by 1945. The government supported housing construction, but the close proximity of homes created a distinct Indigenous neighborhood within Dawson.

=== Segregation and neglect (c. 1905–1942) ===
From around 1905 to 1942, the Anglican Church, alongside territorial police, enforced a period of stable segregation. This relied on stereotypical perceptions of Indigenous people as “wild” or inferior, prevalent in the white communities of Dawson, Mayo, and Whitehorse. In 1925, Dawson residents strongly opposed a school for children of mixed heritage. Under the Indian Act, Indigenous women who married white men lost their Indian status. The age gap between spouses in such marriages widened significantly, from four years between 1900 and 1910 to 23 years by 1950, with white men marrying Indigenous women often being 16 years older.

No legal measures existed to bar Indigenous people from cities, as a Whitehorse Indian agent noted with regret in 1913, except through intimidation or “bluff.” Indigenous people were required to leave Dawson by 7 p.m. in summer and 5 p.m. in winter. Penalties were imposed on Moosehide residents for violating curfews, drinking, or being overly friendly with white residents. By 1929, the curfew was set at 8 p.m., and by 1933, Indigenous people needed special permits to stay in the city, typically granted only with proof of employment. An exception was made for missionaries’ wives, such as the wife of missionary Toddy, who was allowed to remain in Dawson to care for her husband’s ear condition.

In the late 1940s, many Moosehide residents moved to Dawson, but the Indian agent persuaded them to return, citing tuberculosis risks. Neglect of medical care, segregation, and poverty fueled the spread of tuberculosis. A diphtheria outbreak in Moosehide in 1907 killed seven people. Diseases recurred frequently, with 18 to 37 registered deaths annually in Yukon until 1941. In 1942, deaths surged to 64, coinciding with the Alaska Highway construction.

Medical care for Indigenous people was provided by a few hospitals, but in places like Mayo, they were treated in tents behind the facilities. The hospital founded by the Treadgold Mining Company refused to admit them. In Dawson, white mothers refused to share hospital rooms with Indigenous women. Medical care operated on a fee-for-service model, with the Department of Indian Affairs covering costs for indigent patients. By 1914, four doctors were replaced by two in Dawson and Whitehorse, each paid $1,200 annually instead of $2 per patient.

Amid widespread segregation and neglect, the Indigenous population in Yukon stagnated at around 1,300 to 1,600 from 1911 to 1951, with high disease rates and infant mortality. In 1901, the population was 3,322; by 1961, it reached 2,207, and by 1971, 2,580.

The overhunting of caribou herds further threatened their livelihood. The Forty Mile Herd numbered 568,000 in 1920 but fell to 50,000 by 1953 and 6,500 by 1973. Today, it has recovered to 39,000, with plans to increase it to 50,000–100,000. The herd has recently reappeared near Dawson.

=== Land claims, self-government, and cultural revival (c. 1950–) ===
In the 1950s, the Tr’ondëk Hwëch’in began resettling Tr’ochëk, as Dawson’s population dwindled, leading to the transfer of Yukon’s capital to Whitehorse. Families from Fort Selkirk, including the Johnsons, Blanchards, Baums, and Isaacs, returned to Tr’ochëk, living partly through traditional means and partly through wage labor. By the 1960s, Fred Isaac was among the few remaining in Moosehide.

In 1960, Indigenous peoples gained federal voting rights, and Yukon's Indigenous population first participated in territorial elections in 1961. In 1969, Percy Henry was elected chief, serving until 1979.

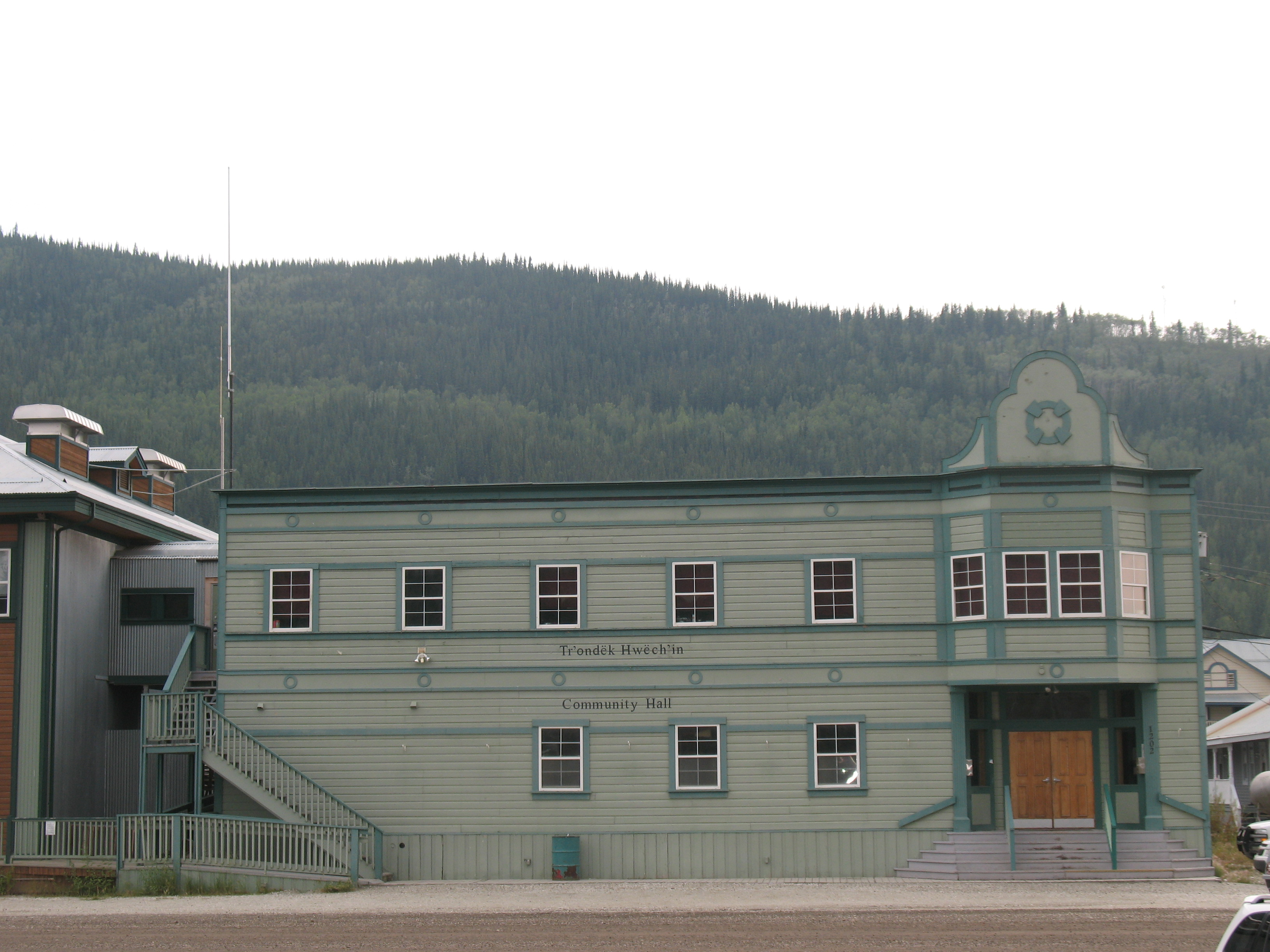
The Community Hall in Dawson

In the 1970s, surviving Hän speakers, with linguist John Ritter, developed a written script to accurately represent their language, supporting language revitalization efforts. Cultural practices were revived, such as the Moosehide River Gathering, a biennial regional event, and the First Hunt ceremony.

In December 1973, Prime Minister Pierre Trudeau received the land claims manifesto Together today, for our children tomorrow. In 1975, Tr’ondëk Hwëch’in elders declared Tr’ochëk integral to their land claims, but gold prospectors occupied the site in 1977, illegally continuing into 1991 and destroying artifacts. Yukon MP Audrey McLaughlin demanded government intervention to halt these activities.

In 1984, Peggy Kormendy became the first female chief, succeeding Percy Henry. In 1983, Joanne Beck was elected chief in Eagle Village. The Tr’ondëk began land claim negotiations with the territory in 1991, incorporating Tr’ochëk in 1992. In 1993, four tribes signed an agreement in principle, but Tr’ondëk Hwëch’in negotiations stalled. In July 1995, the tribe officially changed its name from Dawson First Nation to Tr’ondëk Hwëch’in First Nation. In 1997, the Canadian government purchased all claims in Tr’ochëk for 1 million dollars, leading to a draft agreement.

On August 30, 1996, the tribal office named after Chief Isaac on Front Street burned down.

==== The 1998 agreement ====
On July 16, 1998, the Tr’ondëk Hwëch’in finalized a land claim agreement at the Moosehide Gathering, with 72% approval. The agreement took effect on September 15. Spanning 531 pages, plus an Appendix B with numerous maps, it outlined significant land and rights allocations. The Tr’ondëk Hwëch’in received 2,598.52 km^{2} (1,003.29 sq mi) of settlement land, including 1,553.99 km^{2} (600.00 sq mi) of Category A land, granting exclusive hunting rights and ownership of both surface and subsurface resources, and 1,044.52 km^{2} (403.29 sq mi) of Category B land, providing surface rights and shared hunting privileges with other groups. Tribal members retained hunting rights across their entire traditional territory. For development projects, such as mineral extraction, the Tr’ondëk Hwëch’in are entitled to participation, including job opportunities.

The agreement also provided 48 million dollars in financial compensation, though 17 million must be repaid for various reasons. Additionally, the Tr’ondëk Hwëch’in gained 50% representation in relevant governance bodies, including associated revenues and fees, typically through the Council for Yukon First Nations.

The agreement permanently protected the Tombstone Territorial Park, with the Tr’ondëk Hwëch’in holding a 50% stake in its management. This created a 2,100 km² protected area encompassing parts of the Mackenzie Mountains Ecoregion, the Ogilvie Mountains, and the Blackstone Uplands.

Three historic sites were established: Forty Mile, Fort Cudahy, and Fort Constantine. The Tr’ondëk Hwëch’in and the Yukon government share ownership and equally appoint members to the management board.

The agreement also included provisions for a Caribou Habitat Study Area to assess whether North America’s largest caribou herd, nearly extinct in the past, could be restored.

In 2002, Tr’ochëk was designated a National Historic Site of Canada. The Tr’ochëk Heritage Site supports economic opportunities, particularly cultural representation, with the Tr’ondëk Hwëch’in holding 60% of the management board seats. Parks Canada and YTG Heritage have provided archaeological and historical support since 2002, including assistance in documenting the site’s history, and occupy the remaining seats. The local Robert Service School offers archaeology programs for students.

The agreement significantly impacted the Hän in Alaska, as anyone with a verifiable Hän ancestor can join the treaty. Negotiator Joe Joseph from Dawson began registering applicants in Alaska as early as summer 1997. Under the U.S. Native American Graves Protection and Repatriation Act (NAGPRA) of 1990, Karma Ulvi from Eagle Village demanded the return of artifacts held at the University of Alaska Museum in Fairbanks. Similar efforts to catalog artifacts occurred in Dawson.

==== Constitution and additional agreements ====
On August 22, 1998, the Tr’ondëk Hwëch’in adopted a constitution. Nine of the eleven member nations of the Council of Yukon First Nations (CYFN) have since secured land claim and self-government agreements, assuming responsibilities for legislation, administration, and taxation.

In 1997, Tr’ochëk returned to Tr’ondëk Hwëch’in possession. That year, an excavation campaign began, involving tribal youth who played a key role in learning about their traditional culture. A trail and shelter were established, and in 2002, the site was elevated to a national historic site, with signage added in 2009.

In partnership with the First Nation of Nacho Nyak Dun, the Tr’ondëk Hwëch’in signed an agreement with Yukon Energy to supply Dawson with electricity via the 232-km Mayo-Dawson power line.

==== Current situation ====
Due to a shortage of building land, a new land claim (C-4) was established in Dawson in 2002. In collaboration with the Canada Mortgage and Housing Corporation, founded in 1946 to promote housing, six homes were built initially, followed by six more in 2003. These homes were designed for permafrost conditions and to accommodate extended families, including elders as integral members. The HealthyHousing concept ensured energy efficiency and a healthy indoor environment, while the FlexHousing approach allowed for adaptable entrances, room layouts, and extensions with centralized heating, ventilation, and accessibility. Construction used locally available materials and techniques, given the short summer building season.

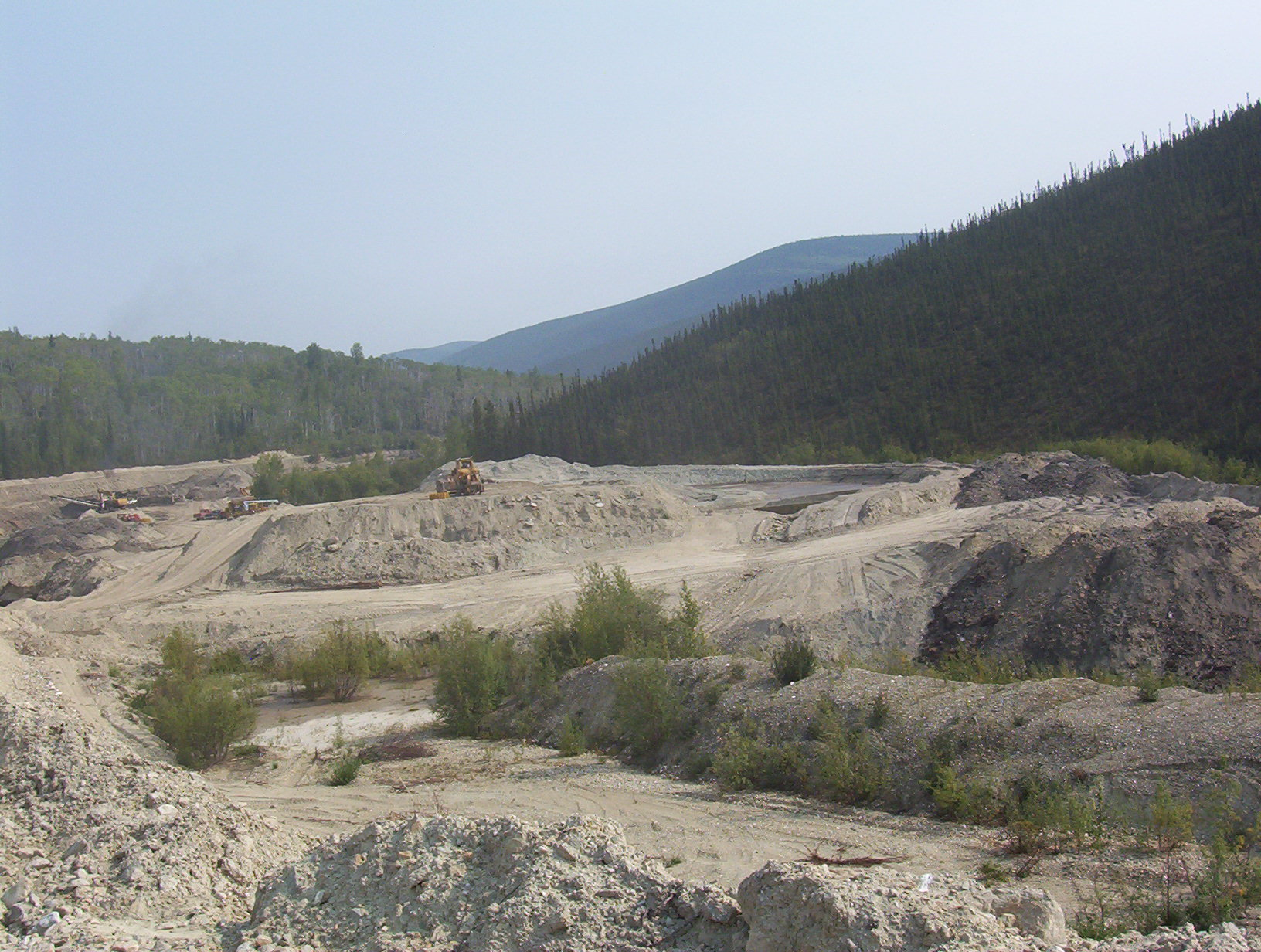
Gold mining near Dawson in the early 21st century

Following research and repatriation efforts, some artifacts have returned to Dawson, making Hän culture more visible to tourists. The River of Culture tour, operated by Hän Natural Products (a branch of Chief Isaac), has run since 2001, traveling by the ship Luk Cho (King Salmon) from Dawson to Tr’ochëk and Moosehide Island.

In 2008, Eddie Taylor was elected chief for a three-year term.

In August 2009, Indigenous and Northern Affairs Canada recorded 692 Tr’ondëk Hwëch’in members, increasing to 788 by May 2013. The tribe’s own records, as of May 5, 2008, listed 1,048 members: 338 in Dawson, 218 elsewhere in Yukon, 492 outside Yukon, including 65 outside Canada. By May 2025, Crown-Indigenous Relations and Northern Affairs Canada reported 996 members, with 797 living off-reserve, nearly 190 on Crown land, only three men in their own reserve, and 6 on other reserves.

==== Moosehide Gathering: commemorating relocation ====
Every two years, the Moosehide Gathering commemorates a half-century of relocation. These gatherings have long served to unite dispersed groups, resolve disputes, arrange marriages, trade with other First Nations, and celebrate rituals like the potlatch. With missionary influence, celebrations shifted to include Easter and Christmas alongside traditional salmon migration festivals. Visitors from Forty Mile, Eagle, Tetlin, and Gwich’in from the Peel and Blackstone Rivers, as well as Northern Tutchone and Tanana, attended gatherings in Moosehide. Chiefs, like Isaac, made reciprocal visits, such as for the appointment of a new chief. Unlike in British Columbia, where the potlatch was banned from 1885, Yukon saw no arrests, though police monitored events, and missionaries simplified ceremonies. The 1970s saw a revival of traditional potlatch celebrations, with the first modern Moosehide Gathering in 1993, followed by another in 1994. Held biennially since, the four-day event attracts hundreds from Alaska, Yukon, and the Northwest Territories. In 1998, the land claim agreement’s approval was celebrated with gift exchanges to reinforce memory and commitment. Younger members learn about their culture through active participation.

==== Repatriation of cultural artifacts and knowledge from Alaska ====
Songs entrusted by Chief Isaac to relatives in Eagle, Alaska, have been returned to the Tr’ondëk Hwëch’in, supporting efforts to revitalize the Hän language.

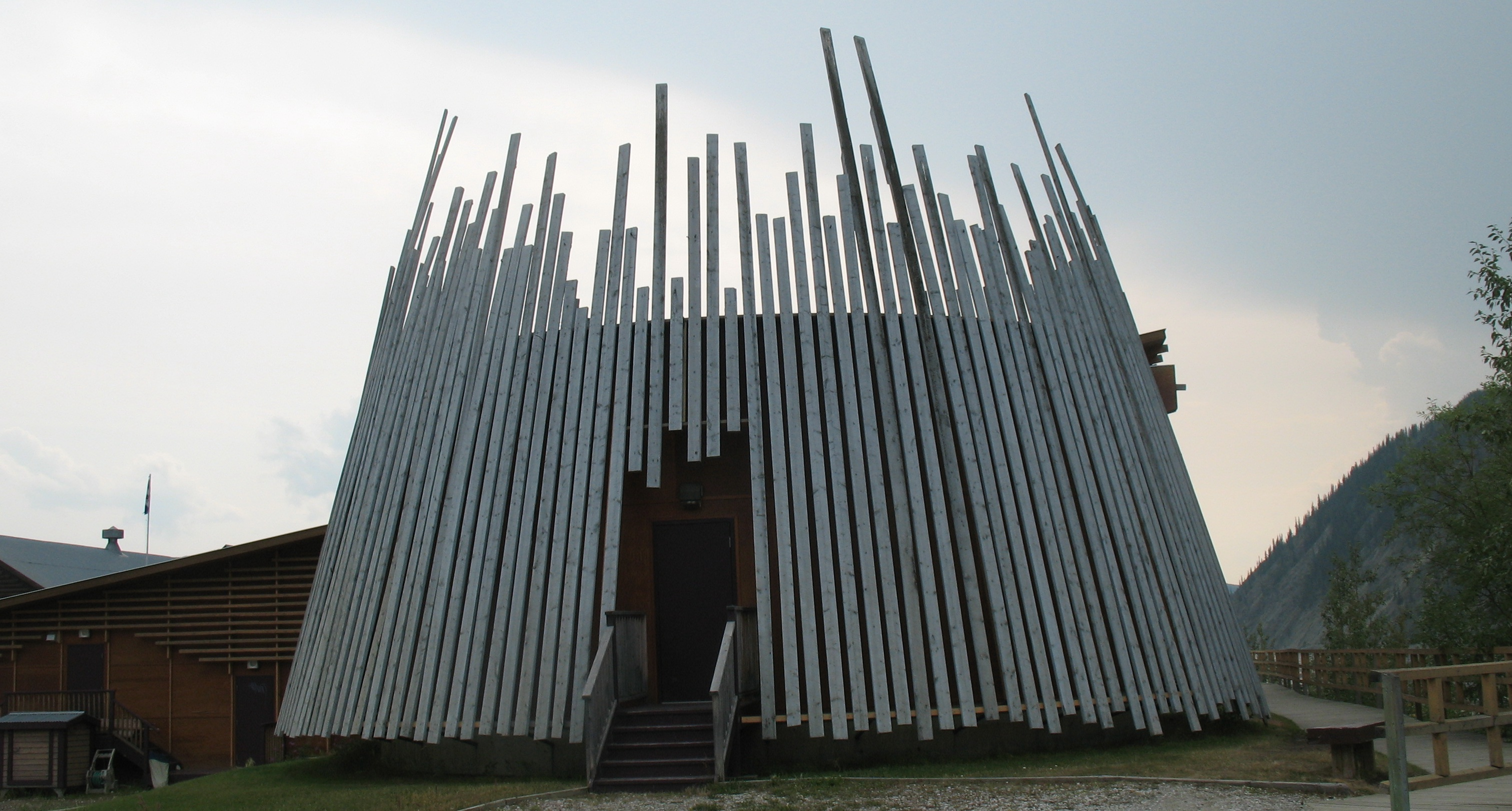
The Dänojà Zho Cultural Centre (Long Ago House) of the Tr’ondëk Hwëch’in on the Yukon River

==== Dänojà Zho Cultural Centre in Dawson (Since 1998) ====
In July 1998, coinciding with the agreement’s signing, the Dänojà Zho Cultural Centre (Long Time Ago House) opened, funded by grants marking the centennial of the Klondike Gold Rush. In 1999, it received the Lieutenant Governor of British Columbia’s Medal in Architecture for its design, which uniquely blends modern architecture with elements of the ancient Tr’ondëk Hwëch’in culture in Dawson, a national historic site otherwise restricted to gold rush-era structures.

==== Black City: hunting grounds and settlement (Until 1927) ====
The Blackstone Uplands hunting grounds were shared by the Tr’ondëk Hwëch’in with two Gwich’in tribes: the Tukudh-Gwich’in from the upper Porcupine River and the Teetl’it-Gwich’in from the upper Peel River. Connected to the Yukon via the Seela Pass and to the Twelvemile River via the Chandindu, the Uplands included Black City (sometimes called Blackstone Village), a settlement of 40–50 people on the west bank of the East Blackstone River, near the Dempster Highway. Located near migration routes of two caribou herds wintering in the Uplands, other settlements included Calico Town, Ts’ok giitlin, and Cache Creek.

Many Gwich’in supplied Dawson twice yearly with meat via a trail through the Chandindu River valley, using dog sleds or pack dogs. Some settled in Moosehide or nearby, forming families like the Martins, Henrys, and Semples. Christmas receptions were held in Moosehide, but some Gwich’in introduced diseases like influenza, with burials conducted by Deacon Richard Martin.

Emerging in the late 19th century, Black City was abandoned by 1927, with residents relocating to Moosehide, Old Crow, or Fort McPherson. The last Gwich’in hunting and trading expedition through the area, from Hungry Lake, Doll Creek, or the Burning Mountains, likely occurred around 1938.

Today, Black City is protected within Tombstone Territorial Park. Archaeological projects, started in 1989, support research and connect younger Tr’ondëk Hwëch’in to the region. The Tr’ondëk Hwëch’in manage the site exclusively, where hunting and fishing continue.

==== Destruction and rebuilding of Eagle (since 2009) ====
In May 2009, Eagle was devastated by the most severe flood in its recorded history, with drifting ice blocks causing widespread destruction. Among the 25 homes destroyed was the historic Eagle Customs House, built in 1900. Eagle Village was also completely destroyed, including its historic church. President Barack Obama declared a state of emergency. During the summer, at least 60 volunteers remained in Eagle City, and by August, 13 new homes had been constructed. In Eagle Village, rebuilding efforts were led primarily by the Mennonite Disaster Service, Samaritan’s Purse, and the Eagle Rebuilding Construction Team.

=== Sources ===
The earliest sources, alongside archaeological findings and oral traditions, include reports from the Hudson’s Bay Company. Among the oldest records are the journals of Alexander Hunter Murray, starting in 1847. Although Murray was an eyewitness, his ability to communicate with the local people was likely limited. Additional reports by William Hardisty and Strachan Jones, though brief, provide some insights. More detailed accounts of Hän culture before 1900 come from Frederick Schwatka, who reported on military expeditions without the aid of interpreters, and journalist Tappan Adney, who lived briefly among the Hän (1897–1898) and published in Harper’s New Monthly Magazine (1900) and Outing (1902). Physician Ferdinand Schmitter, stationed at Fort Egbert around 1906, also documented Hän customs, particularly their medicine men, though it is unclear whether his observations were firsthand or drawn from other sources. No further studies or accounts appear until around 1930.

In 1932, anthropologist Cornelius Osgood, primarily researching the Gwich’in, interviewed several Hän individuals in Eagle, including Walter Benjamin, whose mother was the sister of Chief Isaac, and Jonathan Wood, born around 1850. In 1963, Richard Slobodin conducted research among the Hän in Dawson, interviewing individuals such as Charlie Isaac, Simon, and Mary McLeod.

Overall, the limited sources available until the 1970s reflect a lack of interest in Hän culture, minimal scientific focus (often directed toward neighboring bands), and challenges in linguistic communication.

== Demographics ==
In the 2021 Census of Population conducted by Statistics Canada, Moosehide Creek 2 had a population of 0 living in 0 of its 0 total private dwellings, no change from its 2016 population of 0. With a land area of 8.5 km^{2} (3.3 sq mi), it had a population density of 0.0/km^{2} (0.0/sq mi) in 2021.

== See also ==
- First Nations in Canada
- Indigenous peoples in Canada
- Alaska Natives
- Gift economy
