= Hän =

Indigenous people of Yukon and Alaska

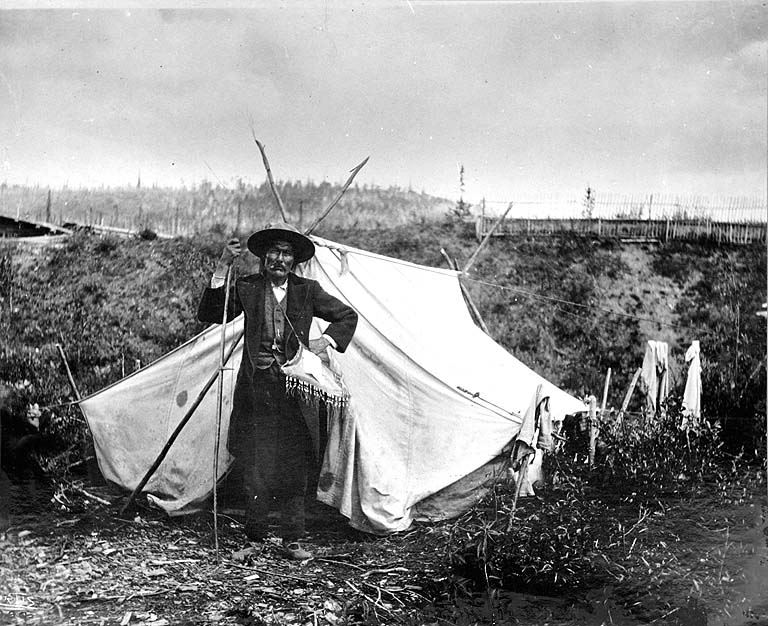
- Chief Isaac of the Han, Yukon Territory, ca. 1898

Total population
- 310

Regions with significant populations
- Canada (Yukon): 250
- United States (Alaska): 60

Languages
- North American English, Hän

Religion
- Christianity

Related ethnic groups
- Gwich'in and other Alaskan Athabaskans

The Hän, Han or Hwëch'in / Han Hwech’in (meaning "People of the River, i.e. Yukon River", in English also Hankutchin) are a First Nations people of Canada and an Alaska Native Athabaskan people of the United States; they are part of the Athabaskan-speaking ethnolinguistic group. Their traditional lands centered on a heavily forested area around the Upper Yukon River (Chu Kon'Dëk), Klondike River (Tr'on'Dëk), Bonanza Creek (Gàh Dëk) and Sixtymile River (Khel Dëk) and straddling what is now the Alaska-Yukon Territory border. In later times, the Han population became centered in Dawson City, Yukon and Eagle, Alaska.

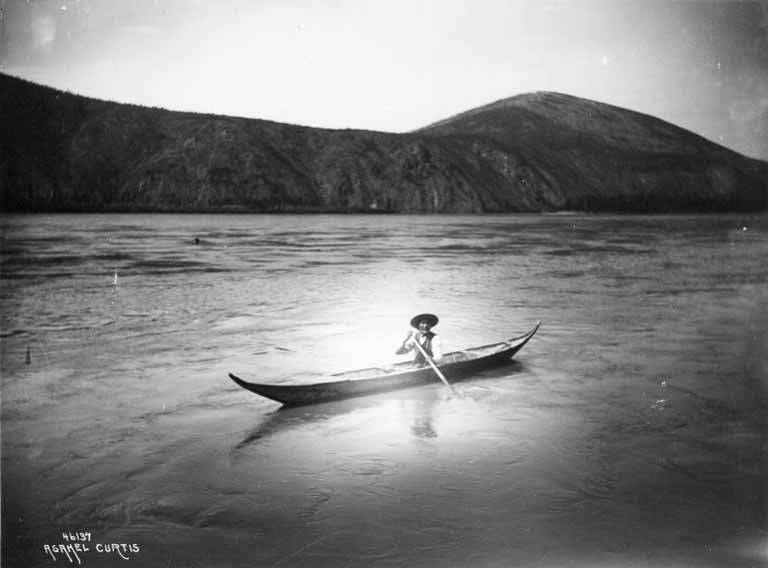
Chief Isaac of the Han in a canoe, 1898

== Etymology ==
The name Hän or Han is a shortening of their own name as Hwëch'in / Han Hwech’in, and of the Gwich’in word Hangʷičʼin for the Hän, both literally meaning "People of the River, i.e. the Yukon River". This word has been spelled variously as Hankutchin, Han-Kootchin, Hun-koo-chin, Hong-Kutchin, An Kutchin, Han Kutchin, Han-Kutchín, Hăn-Kŭtchin´, Hän Hwëch'in, and Hungwitchin.

The Hän were often mistaken for just another Gwich'in (Kutchin) band, especially as part of the Dagoo Gwich'in / Tukudh Gwich'in and Teetł'it Gwich'in / Teetl'it Zheh Gwich'in. The French traders called the Hän Gens du fou, Gens de Fou, Gens de Foux, Gens des Foux, or Gens-de-fine. The name Gens de Foux (and variants) has also been used to refer to the Northern Tutchone (Dan or Huč’an). The Hankutchin were then known as Gens de Bois or Gens des Bois, in association with their forested territory.

== History ==
The Hän were one of the last Northern Athabascan groups to have contact with European peoples. In 1851 Robert Campbell from the Hudson's Bay Company became the first white man known to have entered Han territory, when he traveled from Fort Selkirk to Fort Yukon. It was not until 1873 and 1874 (after the United States purchase of Alaska), that two trading posts were set up. One was established by Moses Mercier, a former employee of the Hudson's Bay Company, in Belle Isle across the Eagle River. The other, Fort Reliance, was established on the Yukon, just below the mouth of the Klondike River, near Dawson, by two Alaska Commercial Company traders, Leroy N. McQuesten and Frank Bonifield. Gradually trading with whites resulted in the Han shifting from their traditional fishing-hunting economy to a fur-trapping economy, as they grew increasingly reliant on such European goods as guns, clothing, and canvas from 1887 to 1895.

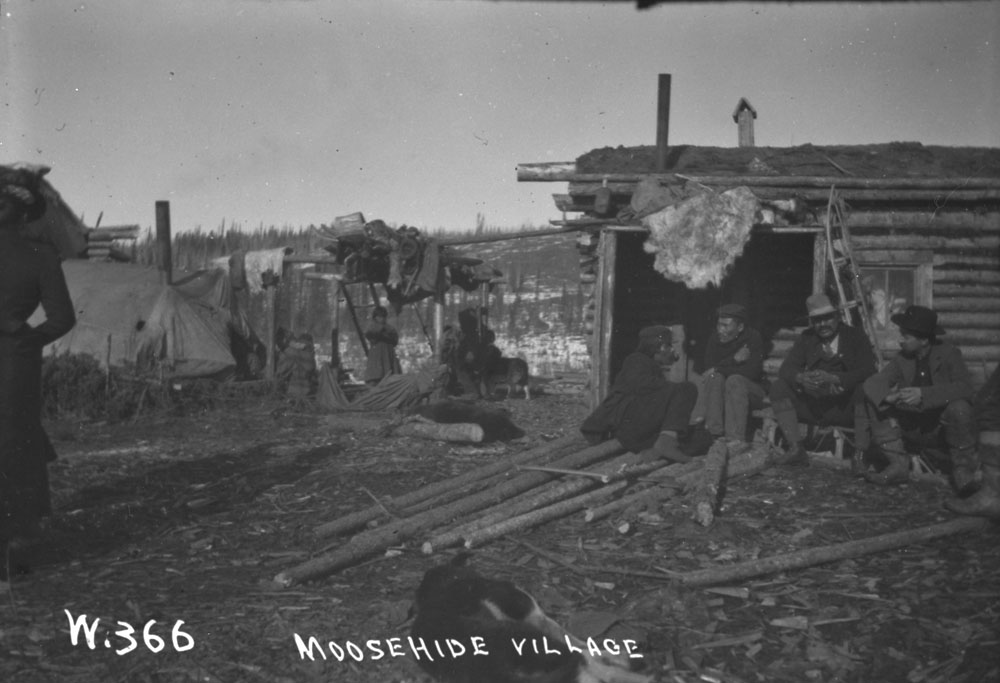
Moosehide village near Dawson City in 1900

Bishop William Bompas established the first Anglican Church mission in Hän territory, and gradually the people shifted away from traditional religion. They also combined it with Christianity in a syncretic fashion. The Han suffered high mortality during several epidemics of new infectious diseases, to which they had no immunity.

== Culture ==
=== Food ===
Historically, fish, especially salmon, comprised the main part of the Hän diet. King salmon was caught along the Yukon River in June and chum salmon in August. Fishing tools included weirs, traps, gill nets, dip nets, spears, and harpoons. Salmon was dried and stored for winter consumption.

Between the salmon runs from June–September, the river camps were abandoned. The Han men sought other fish, moose, caribou, birds, bears, and small game. Men hunted game (once after the salmon run and later for caribou in February and March) while women fished (for fish other than salmon). The women traditionally cooked by boiling food with water heated by stones that been placed in a fire and then dropped in woven spruce-root baskets.

=== Housing ===
A square half-recessed house was made of wooden poles and moss insulation (called a moss house). This served as the main type of housing.

The people erected temporary domed houses made of skin stretched over tied branches when they were traveling.

== Language ==
The Hän language is most similar to Gwich’in (Kutchin). It is more distantly related to Upper Tanana and Northern Tutchone. The language was used as a lingua franca by Gwich’in, Tutchone, Tagish, and Upper Tanana peoples toward the end of the 19th century during the Gold Rush in the Yukon. The language is now the most endangered language of Alaska, with only a few speakers (all are over 60 years of age). The language may have ancient, early Holocene origins in the region.

== In media ==
- Members of the group are encountered on a number of occasions in James A. Michener's 1989 novel Journey in which a group of Europeans try to reach Dawson overland from Athabasca Landing in Alberta in 1897-99.

== See also ==
- Tr'ochëk
- Trʼondëk Hwëchʼin First Nation

== Bibliography ==
- Crow, John R.; & Obley, Philip R. (1981). "Han." In J. Helm (Ed.), Handbook of North American Indians: Subarctic (Vol. 6, pp. 506–513). Washington: Smithsonian Institution.
- McPhee, John. (1977). Coming into the Country. New York: Farrat, Strauss, and Giroux.
- Mishler, Craig and William E. Simeone. (2004). Han, People of the River: Hän Hwëch'in. Fairbanks: University of Alaska Press.
- Osgood, Cornelius. (1971). The Han Indians: A compilation of ethnographic and historical data on the Alaska-Yukon boundary area. Yale University publications in anthropology (No. 74). New Haven, CT.
