= Moosehide =

Tr'ondëk Hwëch'in village in Yukon, Canada

Coordinates: 64°05′47″N 139°26′17″W

Federal census population history of Moose Hide
Year	Pop.	±%
1911	125	—
1941	—	—
1951	60	—
Source: Statistics Canada

Moosehide (Moosehide Hän: Dhä Dënezhu Kek’it; Eagle Hän: Ëdhä Dädhëchan) is a traditional village of the Trʼondëk Hwëchʼin First Nation in the Canadian territory of Yukon. Located near a traditional salmon-fishing ground, Moosehide was first occupied about 9,000 years ago. The Tr'ondëk Hwëch'in Traditional Territory of Moosehead is located on Tr’ondëk Hwëch’in Settlement Land. Moosehide village is closed to visitors, aside from Moosehide Gathering (which occurs for a few days every two years).

Starting in the mid-1800s, and accelerating the Klondike Gold Rush, European settlers arrived in the area and began to settle in and around Dawson City. The Tr'ondëk Hwëch'in were forced to relocate, first just to the south of Dawson and in 1897 to Moosehide.

The St. Barnabas Church was built by the Anglican Church of Canada in 1908. A cemetery with about 200 burials (the oldest from 1898) is located behind the church.

Moosehide is also the site of the cabin of Chief Isaac, who was the leader of the Tr'ondëk Hwëch'in during the Klondike Gold Rush.

The Moosehide Village site (Jëjik Dhä Ëdhä Dënezhu Kek’ìt or Ëdhä Dädhëchan Kek’ìt) is a part of the Tr’ondëk-Klondike UNESCO World Heritage Site.
