= Carmacks, Yukon =

Carmacks
- Village
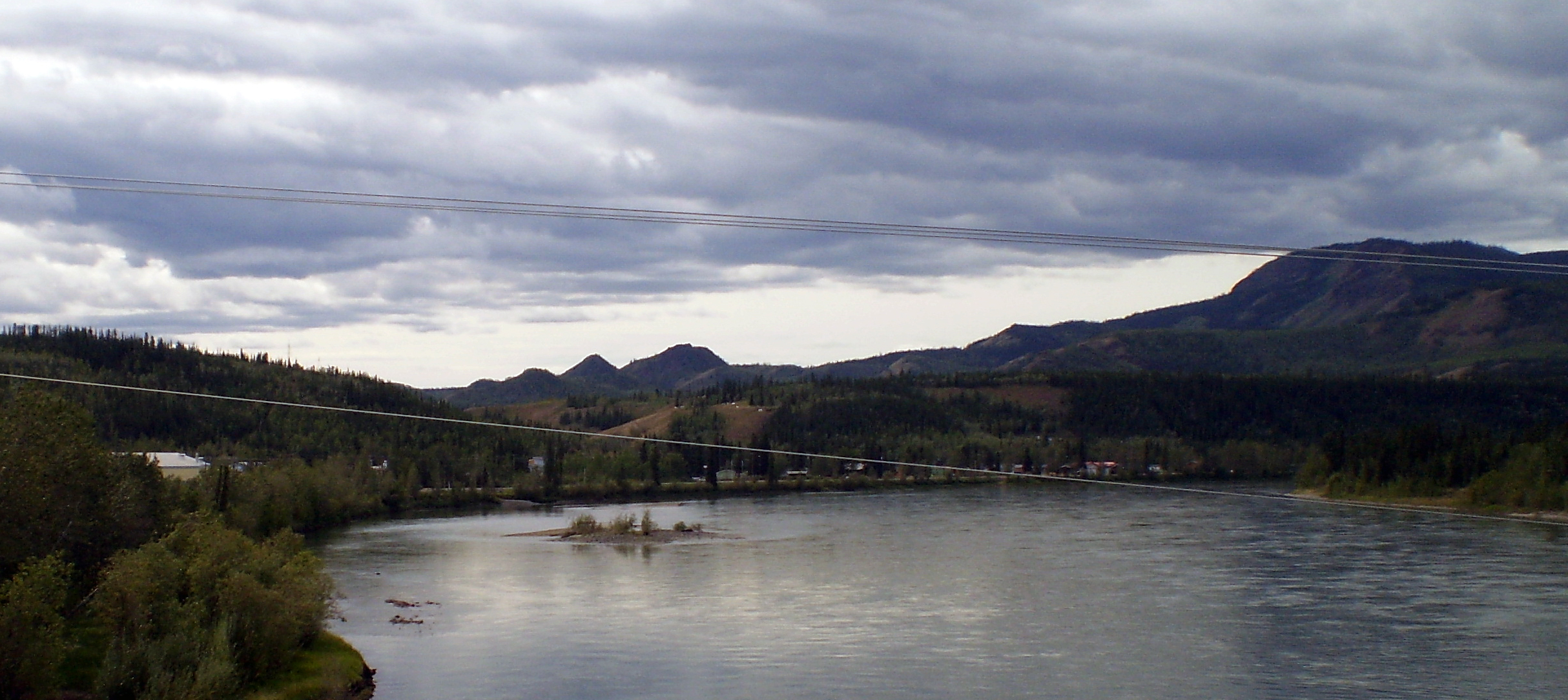
- Carmacks as seen from the Yukon River bridge with the river in the foreground.

- Location within Yukon Location within Canada
- Coordinates: 62°05′20″N 136°17′20″W
- Country: Canada
- Territory: Yukon

Area
  - Land: 36.87 km^{2} (14.24 sq mi)

Population (2021)
  - Total: 588
  - Density: 13.3/km^{2} (34/sq mi)
  - DPL: 206
- Time zone: UTC−07:00 (MST)
- Climate: Dsc
- Website: Official website

Carmacks is a village in Yukon, Canada, on the Yukon River along the Klondike Highway, and at the west end of the Robert Campbell Highway from Watson Lake. The population is 588 (Canada Census, 2021), an increase from the Census of 2016. It is the home of the Little Salmon/Carmacks First Nation, a Northern Tutchone-speaking people.

== History ==
The name of the community comes from George Washington Carmack, who found coal near Tantalus Butte (locally called Coal Mine Hill) in the early 1890s. He built a trading post near the present site of Carmacks and traded with locals before opening a coal mine in the south bank of the Yukon River. The focus of his entrepreneurial energy switched a few years later when he or his wife, Kate Carmack, discovered gold with her brother, Keish (Skookum Jim), and Dawson Charlie (Tagish Charlie) at what was to become the Discovery Claim, near Dawson City, which started the Klondike Gold Rush. Carmacks incorporated as a village on November 1, 1984.

== Geography ==
The community consists of the Village of Carmacks and the Little Salmon/Carmacks First Nation. Carmacks Landing Settlement is within the Village of Carmacks.

Carmacks is situated at the confluence of the Nordenskiold and Yukon rivers, approximately 180 km (110 mi) north of Whitehorse and 360 km (220 mi) south of Dawson City on the North Klondike Highway. It is the site of one of the four bridges over the Yukon River. The Campbell Highway also intersects the community and carries on to Faro, Ross River and Watson Lake, providing a gateway to the Canol Road and some of Yukon's most spectacular scenery.

=== Climate ===
Carmacks has a subarctic climate (Dfc) with short but mild summers and long, severely cold winters.

Climate data for Carmacks Climate ID: 2100301; coordinates 62°06′54″N 136°11′31.1″W; elevation: 12.2 m (40 ft); WMO ID: 71039; 1991–2020 normals, extremes 1963–present
Month	Jan	Feb	Mar	Apr	May	Jun	Jul	Aug	Sep	Oct	Nov	Dec	Year
Record high °C (°F)	9.5 (49.1)	13.0 (55.4)	17.3 (63.1)	23.3 (73.9)	35.0 (95.0)	35.3 (95.5)	34.2 (93.6)	33.0 (91.4)	27.0 (80.6)	23.4 (74.1)	12.8 (55.0)	10.2 (50.4)	35.3 (95.5)
Mean daily maximum °C (°F)	−16.4 (2.5)	−10.0 (14.0)	−1.7 (28.9)	8.4 (47.1)	16.5 (61.7)	21.4 (70.5)	22.5 (72.5)	19.9 (67.8)	13.7 (56.7)	3.9 (39.0)	−9.1 (15.6)	−14.3 (6.3)	4.6 (40.3)
Daily mean °C (°F)	−21.8 (−7.2)	−17.0 (1.4)	−9.6 (14.7)	0.7 (33.3)	8.3 (46.9)	13.5 (56.3)	15.3 (59.5)	12.8 (55.0)	7.1 (44.8)	−1.2 (29.8)	−13.8 (7.2)	−19.3 (−2.7)	−2.1 (28.2)
Mean daily minimum °C (°F)	−26.7 (−16.1)	−23.4 (−10.1)	−18.1 (−0.6)	−6.9 (19.6)	0.0 (32.0)	5.6 (42.1)	7.9 (46.2)	5.6 (42.1)	0.4 (32.7)	−6.0 (21.2)	−17.8 (0.0)	−23.6 (−10.5)	−8.6 (16.5)
Record low °C (°F)	−57.8 (−72.0)	−57.2 (−71.0)	−50.0 (−58.0)	−33.4 (−28.1)	−13.6 (7.5)	−3.9 (25.0)	−1.1 (30.0)	−5.0 (23.0)	−16.5 (2.3)	−32.5 (−26.5)	−46.7 (−52.1)	−54.4 (−65.9)	−57.8 (−72.0)
Record low wind chill	−53.0	−50.7	−47.5	−31.7	−15.7	−4.1	−2.1	−3.4	−14.5	−26.5	−47.4	−51.5	−53.0
Average precipitation mm (inches)	15.4 (0.61)	10.2 (0.40)	10.3 (0.41)	7.1 (0.28)	23.5 (0.93)	31.7 (1.25)	57.4 (2.26)	44.9 (1.77)	24.9 (0.98)	22.5 (0.89)	20.5 (0.81)	18.8 (0.74)	287.1 (11.30)
Average rainfall mm (inches)	0.0 (0.0)	0.1 (0.00)	0.1 (0.00)	2.7 (0.11)	23.9 (0.94)	—	—	—	—	—	0.0 (0.0)	0.0 (0.0)	—
Average snowfall cm (inches)	16.7 (6.6)	10.8 (4.3)	10.2 (4.0)	—	1.2 (0.5)	0.0 (0.0)	0.0 (0.0)	0.0 (0.0)	—	—	20.5 (8.1)	—	—
Average precipitation days (≥ 0.2 mm)	9.2	6.7	6.4	4.4	8.3	10.1	13.2	11.1	9.4	9.1	10.9	9.6	108.3
Average rainy days (≥ 0.2 mm)	0.0	0.06	0.07	0.87	7.2	—	—	—	—	—	0.0	0.0	—
Average snowy days (≥ 0.2 cm)	7.7	5.1	4.1	—	0.53	0.0	0.0	0.0	—	—	8.9	—	—
Source: Environment and Climate Change Canada

== Demographics ==
Combined federal census population history of Carmacks (post-amalgamation)
Year	Pop.	±%
1986	404	—
1991	349	−13.6%
1996	466	+33.5%
2001	431	−7.5%
2006	425	−1.4%
2011	503	+18.4%
2016	493	−2.0%
2021	588	+19.3%
Source: Statistics Canada

Federal census population history of Carmacks Landing (pre-amalgamation)
Year	Pop.	±%
1981		—
1986	124	—
1991	106	−14.5%
Source: Statistics Canada

Federal census population history of Carmacks (pre-amalgamation)
Year	Pop.	±%
1941	50	—
1951	148	+196.0%
1981	256	+73.0%
1986	280	+9.4%
1991	243	−13.2%
Source: Statistics Canada

In the 2021 Census of Population conducted by Statistics Canada, the Village of Carmacks had a population of 588 living in 263 of its 302 total private dwellings, a change of 19.3% from its 2016 population of 493. With a land area of 36.87 km^{2} (14.24 sq mi), it had a population density of 15.9/km^{2} (41.3/sq mi) in 2021.

As a designated place in the 2021 census, Carmacks Landing Settlement had a population of 206 living in 86 of its 95 total private dwellings, a change of 22.6% from its 2016 population of 168. With a land area of 2.41 km^{2} (0.93 sq mi), it had a population density of 85.5/km^{2} (221.4/sq mi) in 2021.

Carmacks has a 91.4% First Nations population the majority of which belong to the Little Salmon Carmacks First Nations. The local language of the LSCFN community is Northern Tuchone, which is carried on both by the elders and taught to all students at the local Tantalus Elementary/high School.

Panethnic groups in the Village of Carmacks (2001−2021)
Panethnic group	2021		2016		2006		2001	
Panethnic group	Pop.	%	Pop.	%	Pop.	%	Pop.	%
Indigenous	420	73.04%	340	70.83%	325	76.47%	295	68.6%
European (Note: Statistic includes all persons that did not make up part of a visible minority or an indigenous identity.)	120	20.87%	115	23.96%	95	22.35%	135	31.4%
Southeast Asian (Note: Statistic includes total responses of "Filipino" and "Southeast Asian" under visible minority section on census.)	25	4.35%	20	4.17%	0	0%	10	2.33%
South Asian	0	0%	10	2.08%	0	0%	0	0%
African	0	0%	10	2.08%	0	0%	0	0%
East Asian (Note: Statistic includes total responses of "Chinese", "Korean", and "Japanese" under visible minority section on census.)	0	0%	0	0%	0	0%	10	2.33%
Middle Eastern (Note: Statistic includes total responses of "West Asian" and "Arab" under visible minority section on census.)	0	0%	0	0%	0	0%	0	0%
Latin American	0	0%	0	0%	0	0%	0	0%
Other/multiracial (Note: Statistic includes total responses of "Visible minority, n.i.e." and "Multiple visible minorities" under visible minority section on census.)	0	0%	0	0%	0	0%	0	0%
Total responses	575	97.79%	480	97.36%	425	100%	430	99.77%
Total population	588	100%	493	100%	425	100%	431	100%
Note: Totals greater than 100% due to multiple origin responses

== Economy ==
The area around Carmacks has abundant mineral resources, including coal, copper, and gold. Various mining activities are taking place on mineral sites around Carmacks. There is a small zinc-copper mine in production near Carmacks operated by Western Silver and a gold property northwest of Carmacks currently in the exploration stage operated by Northern Freegold Resources based out of Whitehorse.

== Attractions ==
The Carmacks Recreation Centre is at the east end of River Drive between the nursing station and visitor centre, and is a community focal point for youth. There is a youth drop in daily with activities often funded by Yukon grant programs. The gymnasium is host to adult floor hockey and other sports. The Recreation Centre also holds a skating rink, fully loaded fitness gym and a full kitchen for all occasions.

== Infrastructure ==
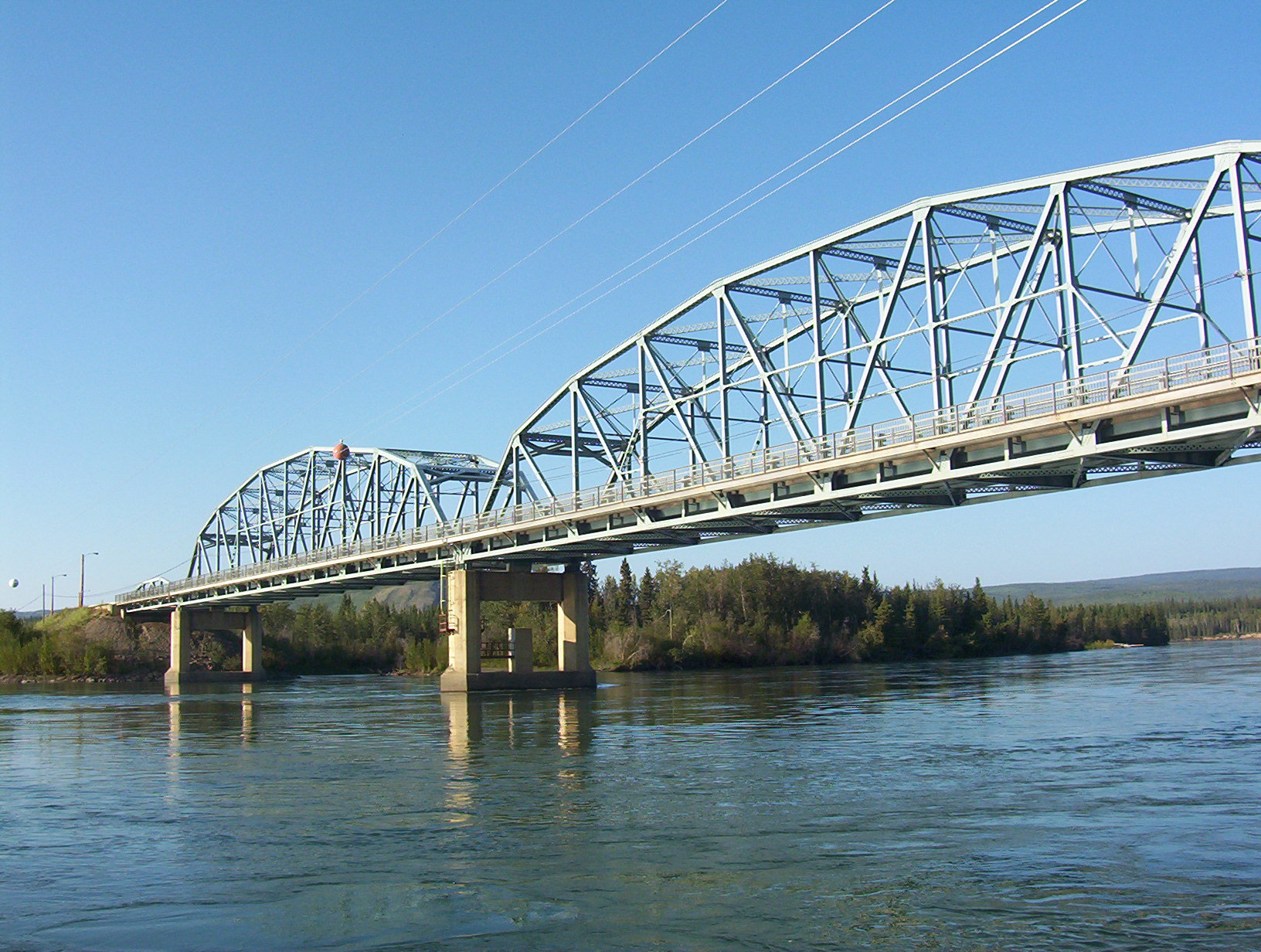
The Yukon River bridge at Carmacks

Carmacks is served by the Klondike Highway by cars and Carmacks Airport by air.

It has been proposed as a hub for an extension of the Alaska Railroad, and historically for an extension of the White Pass and Yukon Route from Whitehorse.

== Sports ==
Every February, Carmacks hosts a checkpoint for both the long-distance Yukon Quest sled dog race and the Yukon Arctic Ultra foot/ski/bike race.

== See also ==
- List of municipalities in Yukon
