= Clinton Creek =

Ghost town in Yukon, Canada

Coordinates: 64.40138°N 140.59861°W

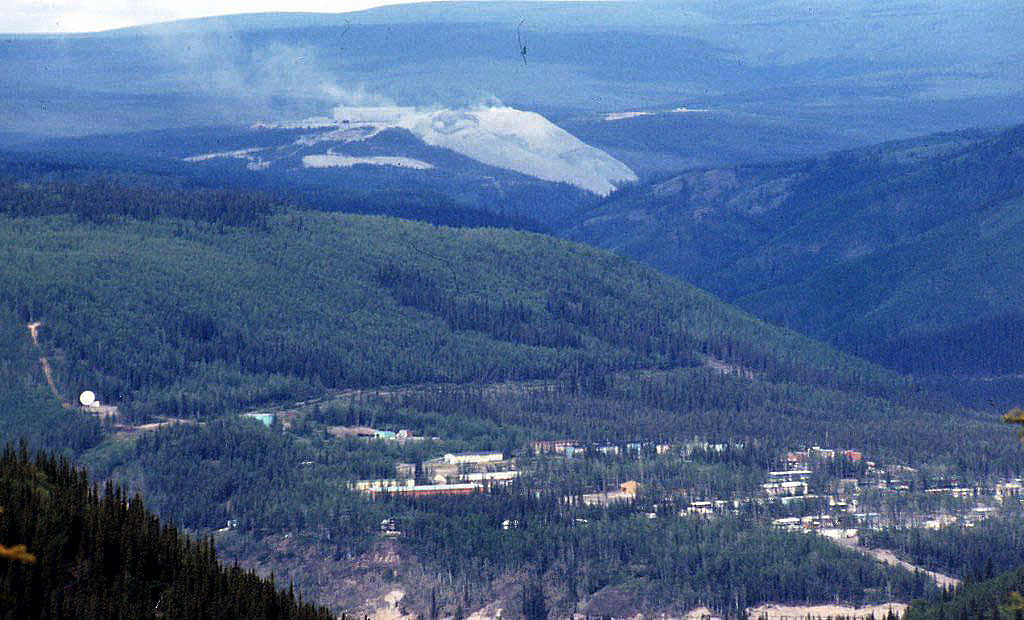
Clinton Creek, Yukon

Clinton Creek (Hän: Dätl'äkayy juu) was a mining town in Yukon. It was a small company-owned asbestos mining town in western Yukon near the confluence of the Yukon and Fortymile rivers. It was operated by the Cassiar Asbestos Corporation, which also operated the asbestos mine in Cassiar, British Columbia, from 1967 to 1978, when it was closed and all the buildings were auctioned off.

== History ==
Clinton Creek had a population of 500, a main building housing the post office, grocery store, cafeteria (used mainly for mine workers), and the remaining rooms served for community social gatherings like a projector set up for weekly reel movies, and a snack bar.

Road access was available via a 30-mile (48 km) road that joined with Yukon Highway 3, known since 1978 as Yukon territorial highway 9, the Top of the World Highway. Mining product was transported across the Yukon River at Dawson City by ferry in summer, ice road in winter, and by a tram system in the spring and fall. At the time, at least some Dawson City residents demanded that a bridge be built. The community was fairly well served, with dial telephone service, and it was one of the only six communities in Yukon with television service before 1973.

Upon the closing of the townsite, many residents dispersed to other mining towns like Cassiar, British Columbia, and Faro, Yukon.

Although the townsite is now abandoned, the road is passable to allow access to the historic ghost town of Fortymile, which was itself abandoned around 1898 when Dawson City boomed. Fortymile was the location of a mining office where the Klondike gold strike claim was registered by George Carmack and his two relatives, Dawson Charlie and Skookum Jim Mason.
