= Tagish (disambiguation) =

The Tagish are a First Nations people of Canada.

Tagish may also refer to:

== Places in Canada ==
- Tagish, Yukon, an unincorporated community
- Tagish Highland, an upland area
- Tagish Lake, a lake

== Other uses ==
- Tagish language, the language spoken by the Tagish people
- Tagish, a steamboat in the list of steamboats on the Yukon River

== See also ==
- Carcross/Tagish First Nation, a First Nation of Canada in the Yukon
- Tagish Road, a highway in the Yukon of Canada
- Tagish Lake (meteorite), a meteorite that fell in the Tagish Lake area, British Columbia, Canada
- Tagish Charlie (ca. 1865–1908), Canadian Tagish/Tlingit First Nation gold co-discoverer
