= Carcross/Tagish First Nation =

Indigenous people of Yukon Territory, Canada

Carcross/Tagish First Nation Band No. 491
- People: Tagish; Tlingit
- Treaty: Carcross/Tagish First Nation Self-Government Agreement
- Headquarters: Carcross
- Territory: Yukon

Population (2019)
- On reserve: 110
- On other land: 103
- Off reserve: 486
- Total population: 699

Government
- Chief: Maria Benoit

Website
- ctfn.ca

The Carcross/Tagish First Nation (C/TFN or CTFN) is a First Nation native to the Canadian territory of Yukon. Its original population centres were Carcross and Tagish, and Squanga, although many of its citizens also live in Whitehorse. The languages originally spoken by Carcross/Tagish people were Tagish and Tlingit.

The original gold discovery that led to the Klondike Gold Rush was made by Tagish people.

The First Nation's Self Government Agreement came into effect in 2006. They are 1 of 11 Self Governing First Nations in the Yukon.

The First Nation is run on a clan-based system of government. There are six clans represented within the governing structure of the Carcross/Tagish First Nation. The Daḵlʼaweidí and Yanyeidí clans are the Wolf Moiety, while the Deisheetaan, G̱aanax̱teidí, Ishkahittaan and Kooḵhittaan clans are of the Raven Moiety. Each of these six clans select representatives that advise and shape Government policy & processes through various Councils and Teams such as: Elders Council, General Council, Executive Council, Land Use Team, Education Advisory Committee, Family Council, and the Housing Team.

C/TFN Government Mission Statement: The Carcross/Tagish First Nation is mandated to protect the environment, health, education and aboriginal rights of our people; to continue to preserve and protect our culture and traditions; to protect and develop our natural resources and strengthen our economy and the government of the Carcross/Tagish First Nation for our future generations.

== Notable residents ==
- Kate Carmack
- Dawson Charlie
- Keish
- Angela Sidney

The discovery claim that started the Klondike gold rush was made by American George Carmack. Skookum Jim and Tagish Charlie from Carcross/Tagish First Nation made claims on either side of the discovery claim and shared the wealth of their four claims, which was reported to be more than one million dollars.
