= George Carmack =

Prospector who discovered gold which led to the Klondike Gold Rush

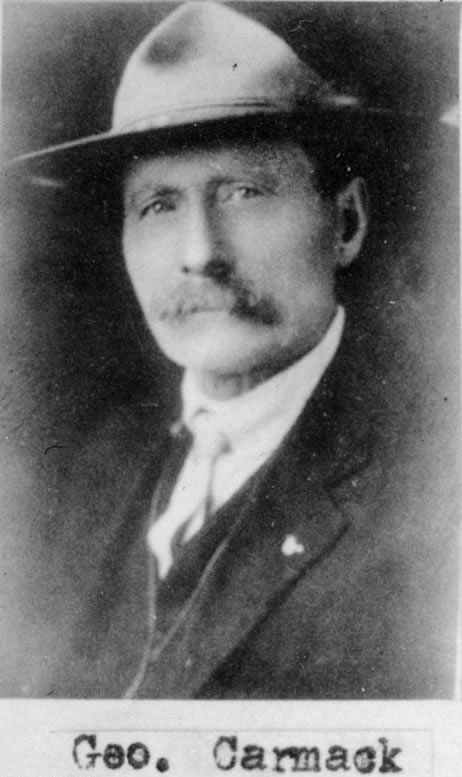
- Carmack c. 1900
- Born: George Washington Carmack; September 24, 1860; Contra Costa County, California, US
- Died: June 5, 1922 (aged 61); Vancouver, British Columbia, Canada
- Resting place: Evergreen Washelli Memorial Park
- Occupation: Prospector
- Known for: With his brother-in-law, credited with making Discovery Claim, the gold discovery that led to the Klondike Gold Rush
- Spouse(s): Kate Carmack (common-law) Marguerite Laimee
- Children: 1

George Washington Carmack (September 24, 1860 – June 5, 1922) was an American prospector in the Yukon. He was originally credited with registering Discovery Claim, the discovery of gold that set off the Klondike Gold Rush on August 16, 1896. Today, historians usually give the credit to his Tagish brother-in-law, Skookum Jim Mason.

== Early years ==
Carmack's mother died when he was 8 years old and his father when he was 11. His great-grandfather was Abraham Blystone. Carmack briefly served in the United States Marine Corps aboard the USS Wachusett and in Alaska before deserting in California in 1882 when he was refused leave to visit his sick sister.

Carmack returned to Alaska in 1885 to engage in trading, fishing and trapping. In 1887, he entered a common-law marriage to Shaaw Tláa, a Tagish First Nation woman known as "Kate".

== Prospector ==
Carmack was not popular with other miners, who nicknamed him "Squaw Man" for his association with native people and "Lyin' George" for his exaggerated claims. Nevertheless, he did find a coal deposit near what is today the village of Carmacks, Yukon which was named after him.

In August 1896, he and Kate were fishing at the mouth of the Klondike River when Skookum Jim, his nephew Dawson Charlie and another nephew found them. Prospector Robert Henderson who had been mining gold on the Indian River, just south of the Klondike, suggested that he should try out Rabbit Creek, now Bonanza Creek, where the gold discovery was made.

The finding of gold made him wealthy and the Carmacks moved to a ranch near Modesto, California and lived with Carmack's sister, Mrs. Hannah Rosella "Rose" Watson.

== Later years ==
In 1900, he abandoned Kate, moved to Seattle, and married Marguerite P. Laimee in Olympia, Washington. They settled into a twelve-room white frame house in Seattle with a garage in the back. Marguerite was a good business woman, and she directed her husband's money into real estate. He owned office buildings, apartment houses, and hotels. He grew fat, eventually weighing well over two hundred pounds. With the passing years, his fortune multiplied as well.

Yet throughout his life George could not stop looking for gold. He worked several claims in California, on the western slope of the Sierra Nevada, and in the Cascade Mountains east of Seattle. George was determined to find another mother lode and re-create the exciting moment of discovery he had experienced as a young man on Bonanza Creek. George died in 1922, at age sixty-one, while working a new claim. He is interred at Evergreen Washelli Memorial Park.

George's daughter with his first wife, Graphie, married Marguerite's brother. Together with his sister, Rose, Graphie challenged and settled out of court the appointment of Marguerite as administrator of Carmack's estate.

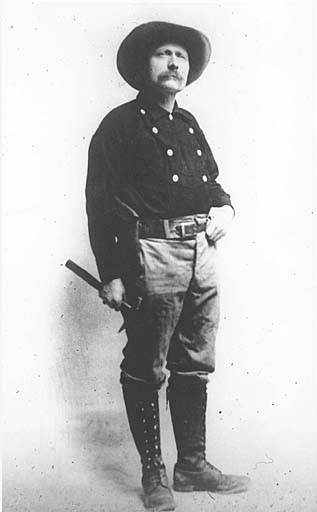

== See also ==
- Jim Robb (painter)
- Mount Carmack
