= Discovery Claim =

Mining claim at Yukon, Canada

Coordinates: 63.9168°N 139.317°W

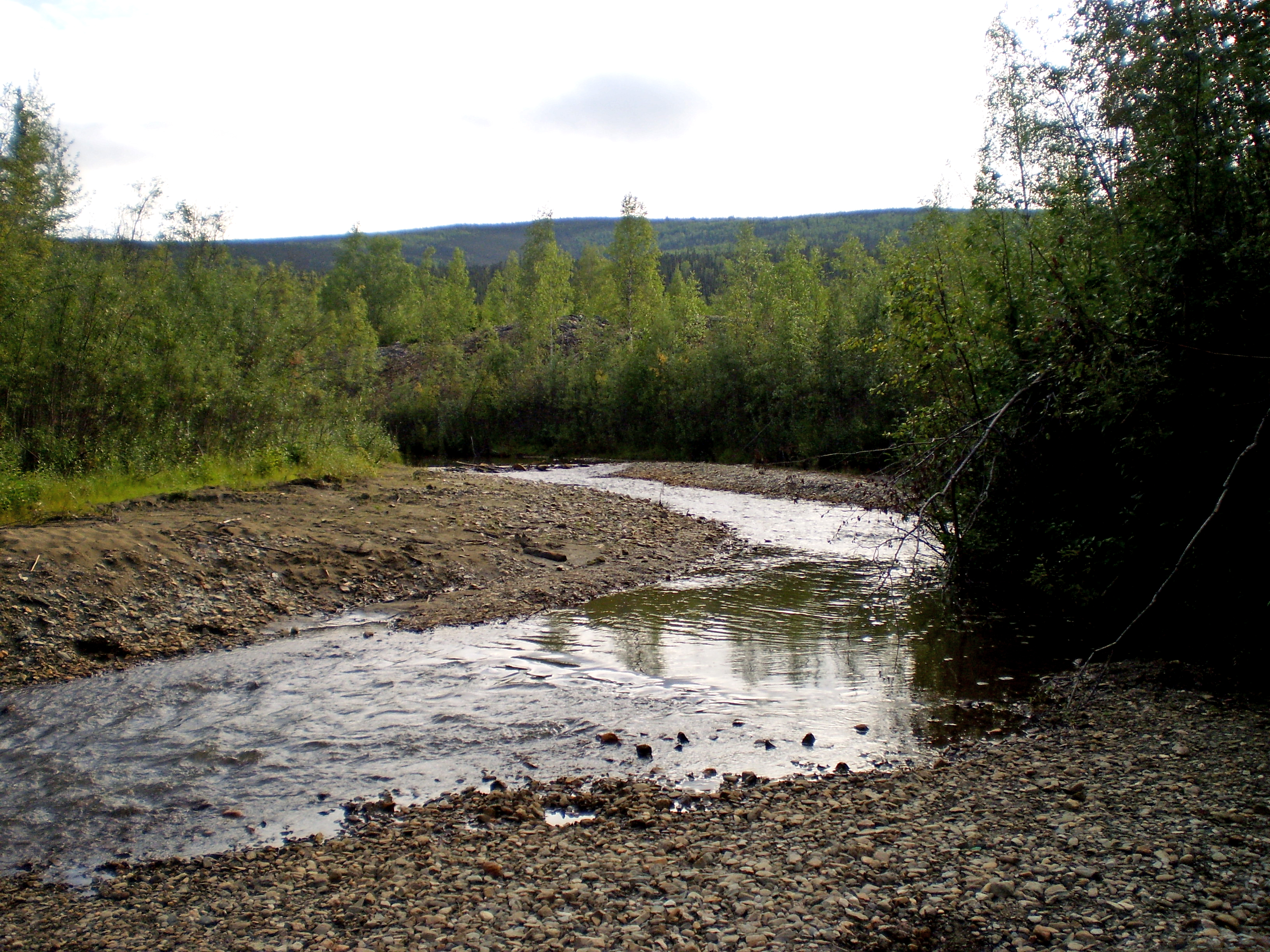
Discovery Claim, 2009

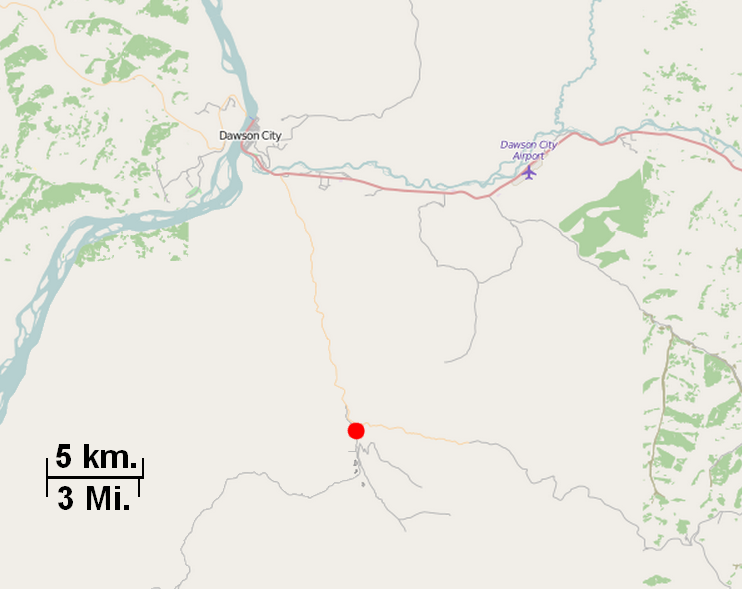
Map showing Discovery Claim with Dawson City upper left and Dawson City Airport upper right

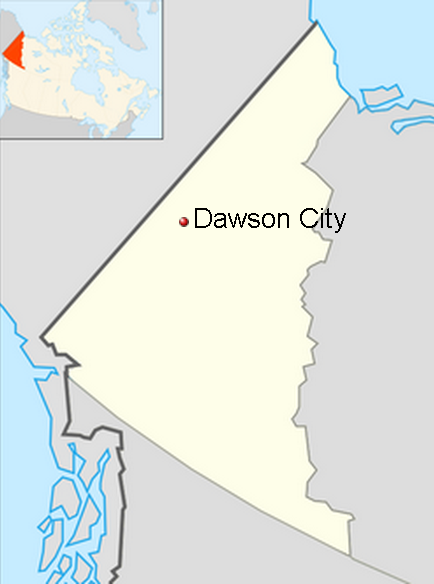
Maps showing location of Dawson City within Yukon

Discovery Claim is a mining claim at Bonanza Creek, a watercourse in the Yukon, Canada. It is the site where, in the afternoon of August 16, 1896, the first piece of gold was found in the Klondike River region by prospectors. The site is considered to be the place where the Klondike Gold Rush started. It is located around 17 kilometres (11 miles) south-southeast of Dawson City. The Discovery claim was designated a National Historic Site of Canada on July 13, 1998.

== Discovery ==
On August 16, 1896 George Carmack, an American prospector, Skookum Jim (birthname Keish), and their nephew Tagish Charlie (K̲áa Goox̱), while travelling through the area, stopped to rest on the banks of one of the Klondike River's tributaries called Bonanza Creek, then called Rabbit Creek. They were there on the suggestion of another prospector Robert Henderson. One of them noticed a shiny object in the water. It was gold and Carmack took credit for finding it. It is uncertain whether it was George Carmack or Skookum Jim who made the discovery, but the group decided that George Carmack be named as the official discoverer out of concern that mining authorities would be reluctant to recognize a claim made by an Indigenous claimant. (Note: To add even more confusion to the question of who deserved credit for the discovery of gold on Bonanza Creek, Robert Henderson and many of his contemporaries threw his name into the ring. Recent historiography discusses the efforts of Henderson to obtain compensation for his missed opportunity. Despite the fact Henderson made disparaging remarks about Skookum Jim and Dawson Charlie, there were many proponents in favor of a Canadian (i.e. Henderson) receiving credit for the strike instead of the American Carmack.)

== Staking ==
On August 17, 1896, they staked out four claims, the first at Bonanza Creek. Two were for George Carmack. At that time, being the first to discover gold in an area entitled him to stake another, second claim. The other two claims were staked on behalf of Skookum Jim and Tagish Charlie.

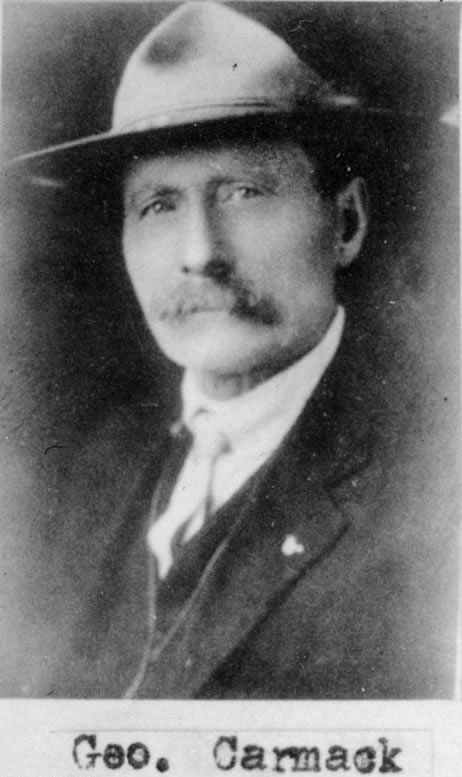
George Carmack, who claimed the discovery

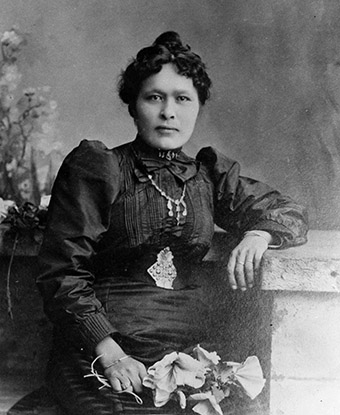
Kate Carmack, his wife, wearing her famous gold nugget necklace, 1898

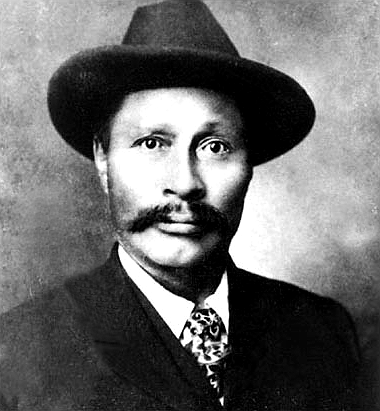
Skookum Jim, one of the discoverers, 1898

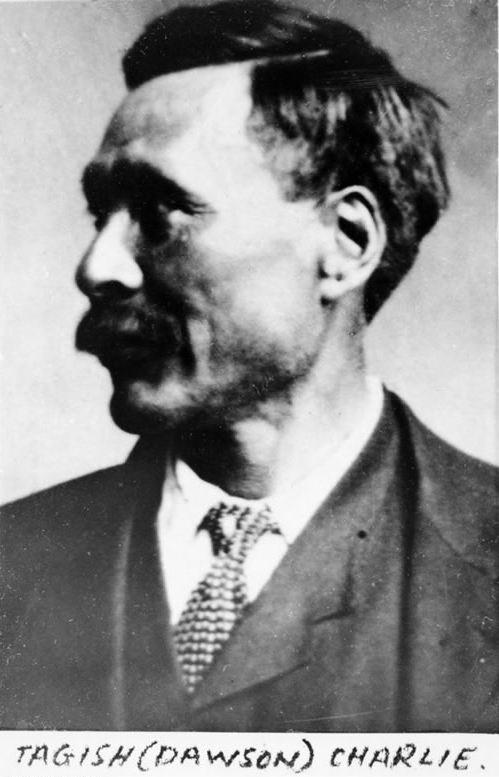
Dawson Charlie

== Registration ==
The following month on September 24 they registered the claims. This took place at the police post in Forty Mile 80 kilometres (50 miles) away at the mouth of the Forty Mile River.

The initial claim is described legally as Claim 37903, a 152.4 metre (500 ft.) by 609.6 metre (2,000 ft.) area.

== Bibliography ==
- Berton, Pierre (2001). Klondike: The Last Great Gold Rush 1896–1899. Toronto, Canada: Anchor Canada. ISBN 0-385-65844-3.
- Cruikshank, Julie (1991). Reading Voices: Dan Dha Ts'Edenintth'E: Oral and Written Interpretations of the Yukon's Past. Vancouver, Canada: Douglas and McIntyre. ISBN 978-0-88894-728-4. OCLC 465712147.
