= Kate Carmack =

Tagish First Nation gold prospector

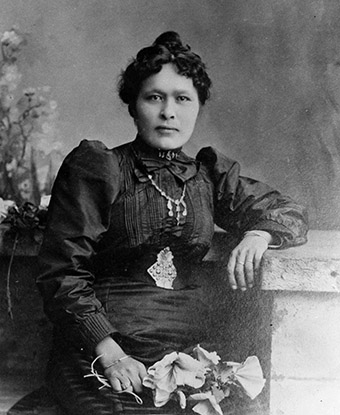
- Born: Shaaw Tláa c. 1857; Near Bennett Lake, Yukon, Canada
- Died: 29 March 1920; Carcross, Yukon, Canada
- Occupation: Seamstress
- Known for: With her husband and brother, credited with making the gold discovery at Discovery Claim that led to the Klondike Gold Rush
- Spouse(s): Kult’ús George Carmack (common-law)
- Children: 3
- Relatives: Keish (Skookum Jim Mason; brother); Dawson Charlie (K̲áa Goox̱; nephew)

Shaaw Tláa, also known as Kate Carmack (c. 1857 – 29 March 1920), was a Tagish First Nation woman who was one of the party that first found gold in the Klondike River in 1896, and is sometimes credited with being the person who made the actual discovery, although her biographer, Deb Vanasse, has concluded that her brother Keish (Skookum Jim) was the one that actually found the gold, and that Kate stayed behind at the family fish camp at the mouth of the Klondike River while her husband George Carmack, her nephew Kaa Goox, and Keish were away prospecting. According to Vanasse, in August 1896 Kate met prospector William Douglas Johns at the fish camp, and he asked her if she would see him a pair of moose hide mittens. This Kate agreed to, and Vanasse wrote “she stayed up all night cutting and stitching the mittens, for which her visitor paid with a large black silk handkerchief, a bargain that, according to him, pleased Kate greatly. (Vanasse, Wealth Woman, Kate Carmack and the Klondike Race for Gold, University of Alaska Press, 2016, 123)

== Early years ==
Born near Bennett Lake, she lived near Carcross, Yukon with her parents and seven siblings. Her father, Kaachgaawáa, was the head of the Tlingit crow clan, while her mother, Gus’dutéen, was a member of the Tagish wolf clan. Her name in Tlingit means "gumboot mother". As a young woman, she married her first cousin, Kult’ús.

In the early 1880s, Shaaw Tláa's husband and their infant daughter died of influenza in Alaska, at which time she returned to her village. It was here, in 1887, that her brother Keish (Skookum Jim Mason) and nephew Dawson Charlie (K̲áa Goox̱) started a packing, hunting, and prospecting partnership with George Washington Carmack, an American. She became Carmack's common-law wife within the year and took the name Kate Carmack.

For six years starting in 1889, the couple lived in the Forty Mile region. Carmack prospected, trapped, and traded, while Shaaw Tláa made winter clothing that she sold to miners. Their daughter, Graphie Grace Carmack, was born in 1893 in Fort Selkirk.

== Gold discovery ==
Kate and her husband were fishing for salmon at the mouth of the Klondike River in August 1896, when a party led by her brother, including two nephews, came looking for her. The party then discovered gold in Rabbit Creek (later renamed Bonanza Creek), setting in motion the Klondike Gold Rush. Some accounts claim that it was Kate who made the actual discovery.

After becoming wealthy, the Carmacks moved to Hollister, California, to live with Carmack's sister, Mrs. Hannah Rosella "Rose" Watson. Subsequently, Carmack left California, Kate, Graphie, and his former partners. Kate and Graphie stayed with Rose. George Carmack married Marguerite Laimee in 1900 in Olympia, Washington. Kate, unable to prove she was George's lawful wife and deemed ineligible for alimony, returned to Carcross in July.

== Later years ==
Keish built Kate a cabin near his, and Kate's daughter Graphie attended mission and residential schools in Carcross and Whitehorse that were run by Bishop William Carpenter Bompas, before Graphie moved to Seattle, Washington.

Kate Carmack died of influenza during the worldwide influenza epidemic of 1918-1920 in Carcross.

In recognition of her presence when the first gold nugget was removed from Bonanza Creek, Carmack was inducted into Canada's Mining Hall of Fame in 2018. Her contributions includes helping her family members survive by providing food and clothing. Her husband, brother, and nephew were honored for their gold discoveries by the Mining Hall of Fame two decades prior to Carmack.

== Sources ==
- "SHAAW TLÁA (Kate Carmack)". canadianmysteries.ca.
- "Guide to the George W. Carmack Papers". lib.washington.edu. Archived from the original on 2012-07-22.
