= Tagish =

Athabaskan ethnolinguistic group native to the Yukon Territory of Canada

Tagish Tā̀gish kotʼīnèʼ
Regions with significant populations
- Canada (Yukon)

Languages
- English, Tagish

Religion
- Christianity, Animism

Related ethnic groups
- Kaska Dena, Tahltan

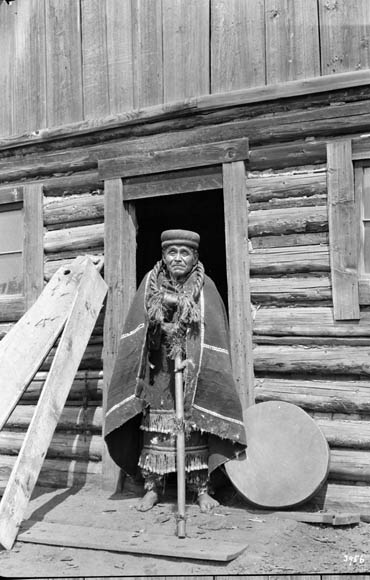
Charlie Skookum, a Tagish medicine man, in 1914.

The Tagish or Tagish Khwáan (Tagish: Tā̀gish kotʼīnèʼ; Tlingit: Taagish ḵwáan) are a First Nations people of the Athabaskan-speaking ethnolinguistic group that lived around Tagish Lake and Marsh Lake, in Yukon of Canada. The Tagish intermarried heavily with Tlingit from the coast and the Tagish language became extinct in 2008. Today Tagish people live mainly in Carcross or Whitehorse and are members of the Carcross/Tagish First Nation or the Kwanlin Dün First Nation.

Members of the Tagish First Nation made the gold discovery that led to the Klondike Gold Rush: Keish (Skookum Jim Mason), Shaaw Tláa (Kate Carmack) and Káa goox (Dawson Charlie).

The word Tagish also refers to the Tagish language, an Athabaskan language spoken by the ancestors of these people.

Tagish means "it (spring ice) is breaking up" and also gave its name to Tagish Lake.

== Culture ==
The Tagish used to historically engage in trading furs, fishing and hunting. The Tagish had close trading contacts with the Tlingit until the late 19th century when the Klondike gold rush disrupted the trading relationship between the two groups.

The Tagish used to practice shamanism or animism. Belief in nature spirits, reincarnation and men and some women having personal spirit guides were widespread. By the early 20th century, most Tagish were Christian.
