= Bonanza Creek =

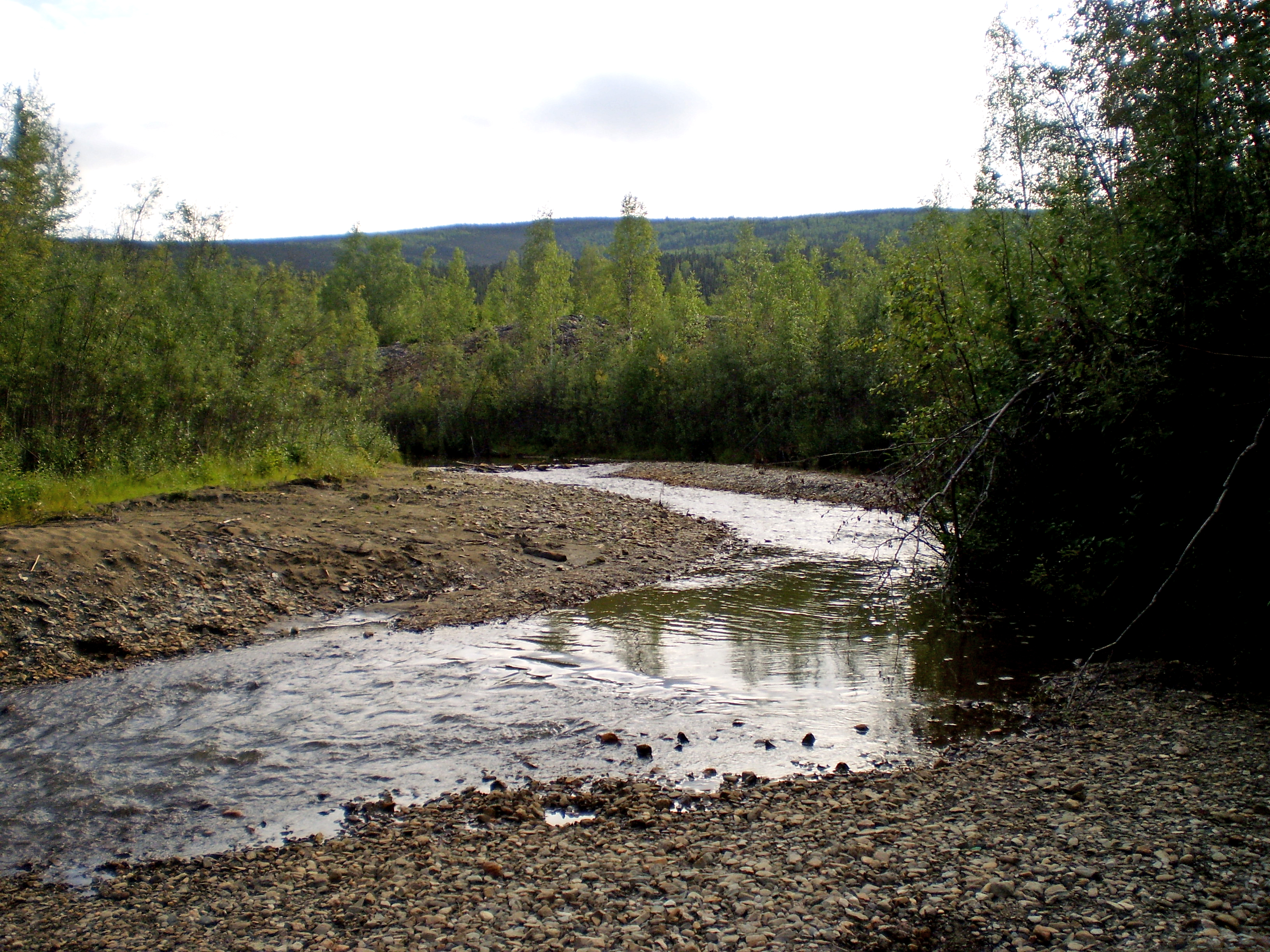
- Discovery Claim on Bonanza Creek, August 2009
- Native name: Ch'ö`chozhù' ndek (Hän)

Location
- Country: Canada
- Territory: Yukon

Physical characteristics
- Source: King Solomon's Dome
- Mouth: Klondike River
  - coordinates: 64°02′31″N 139°25′20″W
- Length: 32 km (20 mi)

National Historic Site of Canada
- Official name: Dredge No. 4 National Historic Site of Canada
- Designated: 1997

National Historic Site of Canada
- Official name: Discovery Claim (Claim 37903) National Historic Site of Canada
- Designated: 1998

Bonanza Creek (Hän: Ch'ö`chozhù' ndek) is a watercourse in Yukon Territory, Canada. It runs for about 20 miles (32 km) from King Solomon's Dome to the Klondike River. In the last years of the 19th century and the early 20th century, Bonanza Creek was the centre of the Klondike Gold Rush, which attracted tens of thousands of prospectors to the creek and the area surrounding it. Prior to 1896 the creek was known as Rabbit Creek. Its name was changed by miners in honour of the millions of dollars in gold found in and around the creek.

During gold-mining operations, the course of the creek changed drastically. It was heavily developed during the early 20th century, but was largely abandoned by the 1950s. A handful of small gold-mining operations continue on the creek, but today it is best known for its historic value. Two National Historic Sites of Canada have been designated along the creek:

- The "Discovery Claim (Claim 37903)", a mining claim on Bonanza Creek where the Klondike Gold Rush began, the discovery of which marked the beginning of the development of the Yukon; and
- "Dredge No. 4", a preserved bucketline sluice dredge used to mine placer gold and which symbolizes the importance of dredging operations to the evolution of gold mining in the Klondike.

== Gallery ==
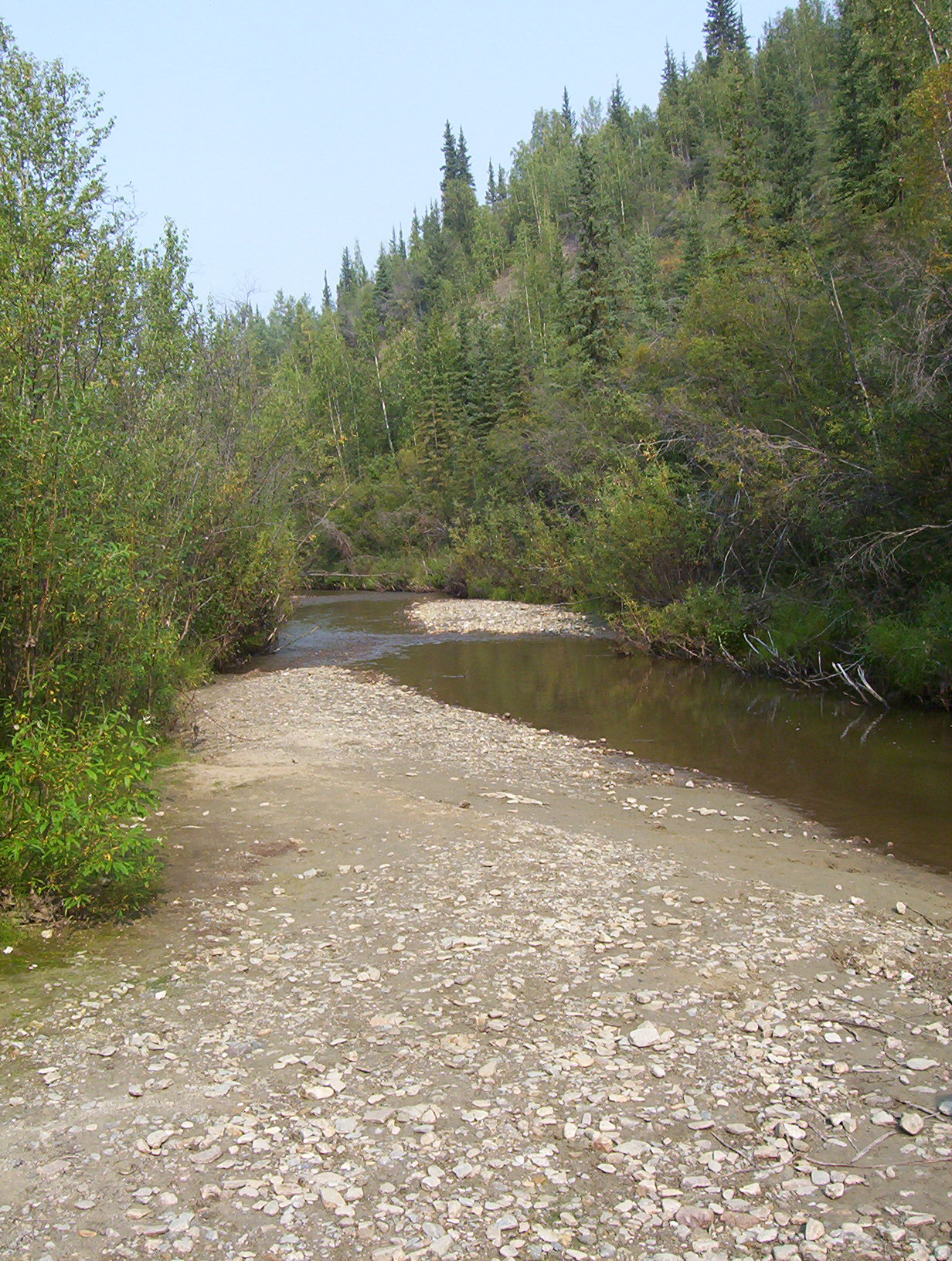
Discovery Claim at Bonanza Creek

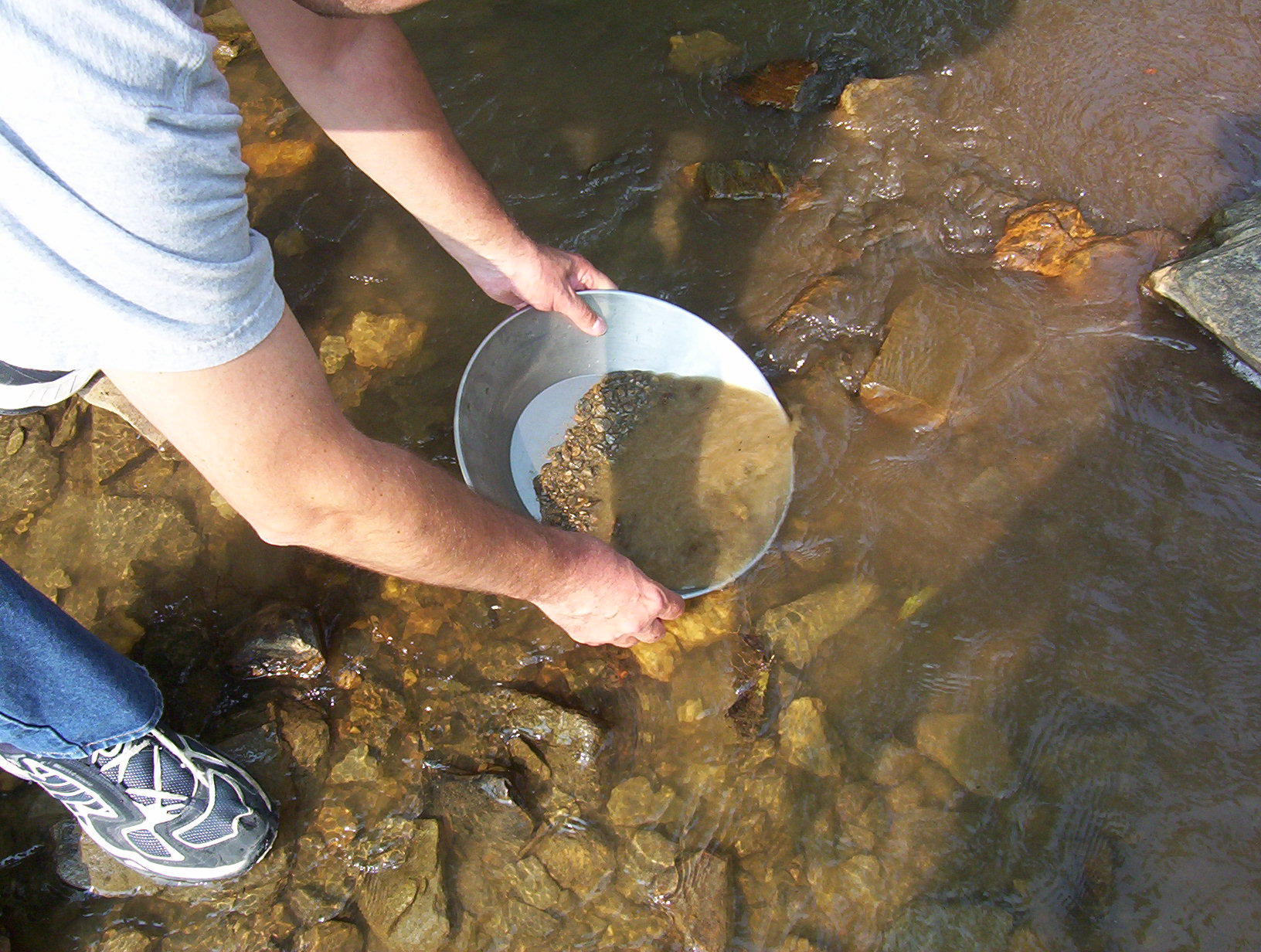
Gold panning at Bonanza Creek

== See also ==
- List of rivers of Yukon
