= Keish =

Indigenous Canadian miner (c. 1855 – 1916)

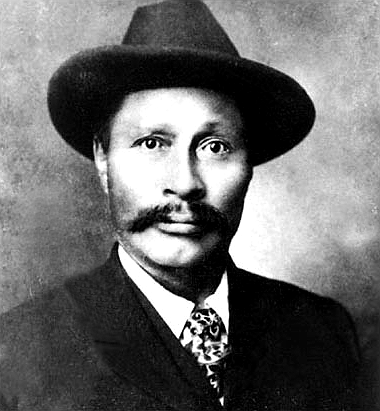
- Keish in 1898
- Born: c. 1855 near Bennett Lake, Yukon
- Died: July 11, 1916 (aged 60–61); Whitehorse, Yukon, Canada
- Other names: James Mason; Skookum Jim Mason
- Known for: Discovery Claim that led to the Klondike Gold Rush
- Spouse: Daakuxda.éit (Mary)
- Children: Saayna.aat (Daisy)

Keish (c. 1855 – July 11, 1916), also known as James Mason and by the nickname Skookum Jim Mason, was a member of the Tagish First Nation in what became the Yukon Territory of Canada. He was born near Bennett Lake, on what is now the Yukon–British Columbia border. He lived in Caribou Crossing, now Carcross, Yukon.

== Childhood ==
Keish was born around 1855 near Lake Bennett into the Daḵl'aweidi clan of Tagish. His mother, Gus'duteen, was from Tahltan country around Telegraph Creek while his father was Kaachgaawáa, chief of the Tagish Deisheetaan. His family was involved in trade between the coastal Tlingit and the inland Tagish. The family had two sons and six daughters who reached adulthood. The name Keish is a Tagish word meaning "wolf".

== Packing career ==
In the mid-1880s, Keish spent the summers working as a packer, carrying supplies from the Alaska Coast over the passes to the Yukon River system. He earned his Skookum nickname because of his extraordinary strength: he could carry huge loads of more than 45 kg (99 lb). Skookum means "strong", "big", and "reliable" in the Chinook Jargon and regional English as used in the Pacific Northwest.

Keish assisted the government surveyor William Ogilvie in his explorations of the upper Yukon River. He reportedly packed 70 kilos of bacon over the Chilkoot Pass for the surveyor, which was more than double the regular load.

Keish met George Washington Carmack, an American trader and prospector, while working on the Trail at Dyea. Keish and Carmack became friends, and together with Keish's nephew Káa Goox (Dawson Charlie) they formed a partnership and spent two years packing on the Chilkoot Pass. Carmack later started a family with Keish's sister Shaaw Tláa (Kate Carmack). In 1887, Keish helped Captain William Moore with a survey of the White Pass, a low lying pass to the east of the Chilkoot Trail. This was later developed as an alternative route to the Klondike.

== Klondike discovery ==
Through Carmack, Keish became interested in prospecting, and in 1888 Carmack, Keish, and Goox began prospecting together up the Yukon River. In the summer of 1889, George and Kate Carmack left Tagish to go prospecting in the Forty Mile region. Keish remained in Tagish, and in the early 1890s he married Daakuxda.éit (Mary), a Tlingit woman. In 1891, the couple had daughter Saayna.aat, known also as Daisy.

Several years later, having heard no news of the Carmack family, Keish and his nephews Koołseen (Patsy Henderson) and Káa Goox went to search for them. They discovered the Carmacks and their daughter at the mouth of the Klondike River. Keish, George, and Káa Goox then set off from the fishing camp to go prospecting in the Klondike basin. They encountered Robert Henderson, who was also prospecting for gold. Henderson told Carmack that he knew of a promising spot to look for gold, but would not share it with Carmack's First Nations companions. The trio were incensed and left the area. A few days later, in mid August 1896, they discovered gold on Rabbit (Bonanza) Creek when one of them found a nugget the size of a dime. Who saw the gold first is a matter of dispute. Carmack claimed that he noticed it first, but Keish and his nephew asserted that it was Keish who was the discoverer. At any rate, in September 1896 Carmack staked a double "discovery claim", while Keish and Charlie staked claims on either side of it. Although the claim was close to the area Henderson had indicated, they chose not to inform Henderson, who thus missed out.

From 1896 to 1900, the men worked together on the claims, and between them found gold worth almost a million dollars.

== Later life ==
This sudden wealth drastically changed the lives of Keish and his family. Seeking to live by non-native standards, in 1898 Keish built a large, ornately furnished house in Carcross for himself and his family. He lived there in the winters before returning each spring to the Klondike, where he continued hunting, trapping and prospecting for gold. In 1903, he and his nephew Káa Goox made a further but smaller discovery in the Kluane region.

In 1904, Keish sold his claims in the Klondike for $65,000. He developed a drinking problem, and as a result in 1905 he created the Daisy Mason Trust to protect his fortune from being spent on alcohol or gifts to others, because it was meant to provide for his daughter's education. His marriage also suffered, and following several attempts at reconciliation, in 1905 they separated and Daakuxda.éit returned to her village on the Alaskan coast. Their daughter remained in Keish's custody.

Keish was known for his generosity to his family and others. When Carmack abandoned his wife Kate, leaving her virtually penniless, Keish built his sister a cabin in Carcross. According to Daniel Tlen, "in 1912 he gave the largest potlatch ever held in honour of his deceased nephew Khaa Ghooxh, Dawson Charlie."

Keish died in Whitehorse, Yukon on July 11, 1916, after a long illness. In his will, he left the income of the trust to his daughter Saayna.aat (Daisy Mason) and also made legacies to his sister Kate, his nephew Koołseen (Patsy Henderson), and two other relatives, although these legacies were never paid. When his daughter died in 1938, the income from the trust was used, as directed by Keish's will, to the benefit of needy Indigenous peoples in Yukon. The Skookum Jim Friendship Centre in Whitehorse was built using this trust fund.

A fictionalized version of Skookum Jim appears in the TG4 series An Klondike, portrayed by Julian Black Antelope, where he is depicted as a Hän and is killed by the fictional character Pat Galvin in 1898.
