= Klondike River =

Tributary of the Yukon River in Yukon Territory, Canada

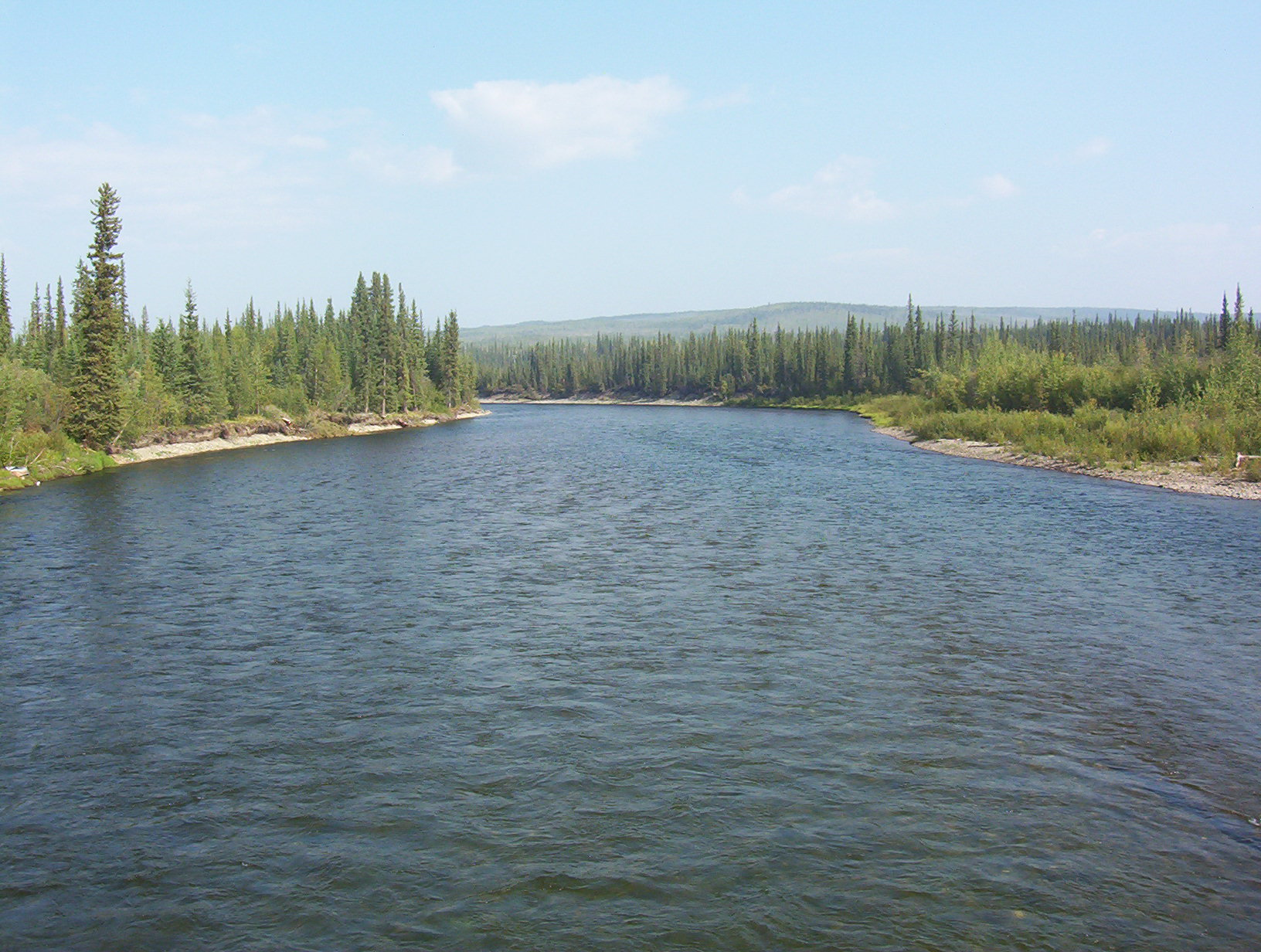
- Klondike River crossing Dempster Highway (upstream)
- Native name: Tr'ondëk (Hän)

Location
- Country: Canada
- Territory: Yukon

Physical characteristics
- Source: Ogilvie Mountains
- Mouth: Yukon River
  - location: Dawson City, Yukon, Canada
  - coordinates: 64°03′08″N 139°26′27″W
- Length: 160 km (99 mi)

The Klondike River (Hän: Tr'ondëk) is a tributary of the Yukon River in Canada that gave its name to the Klondike Gold Rush and the Klondike region of the Yukon Territory. The Klondike River rises in the Ogilvie Mountains and flows into the Yukon River at Dawson City.

Its name comes from the Hän word Tr'ondëk (IPA: [ʈʂʼoⁿdək]) meaning hammerstone, a tool which was used to hammer down stakes used to set salmon nets.

Gold was discovered in tributaries of the Klondike River in 1896, which started the Klondike Gold Rush, and is still being mined today.

In Jack London's story "A Relic of the Pliocene" (Collier's Weekly, 1901), this river was mentioned as "Reindeer River". (See Reindeer Lake.)

== Gallery ==
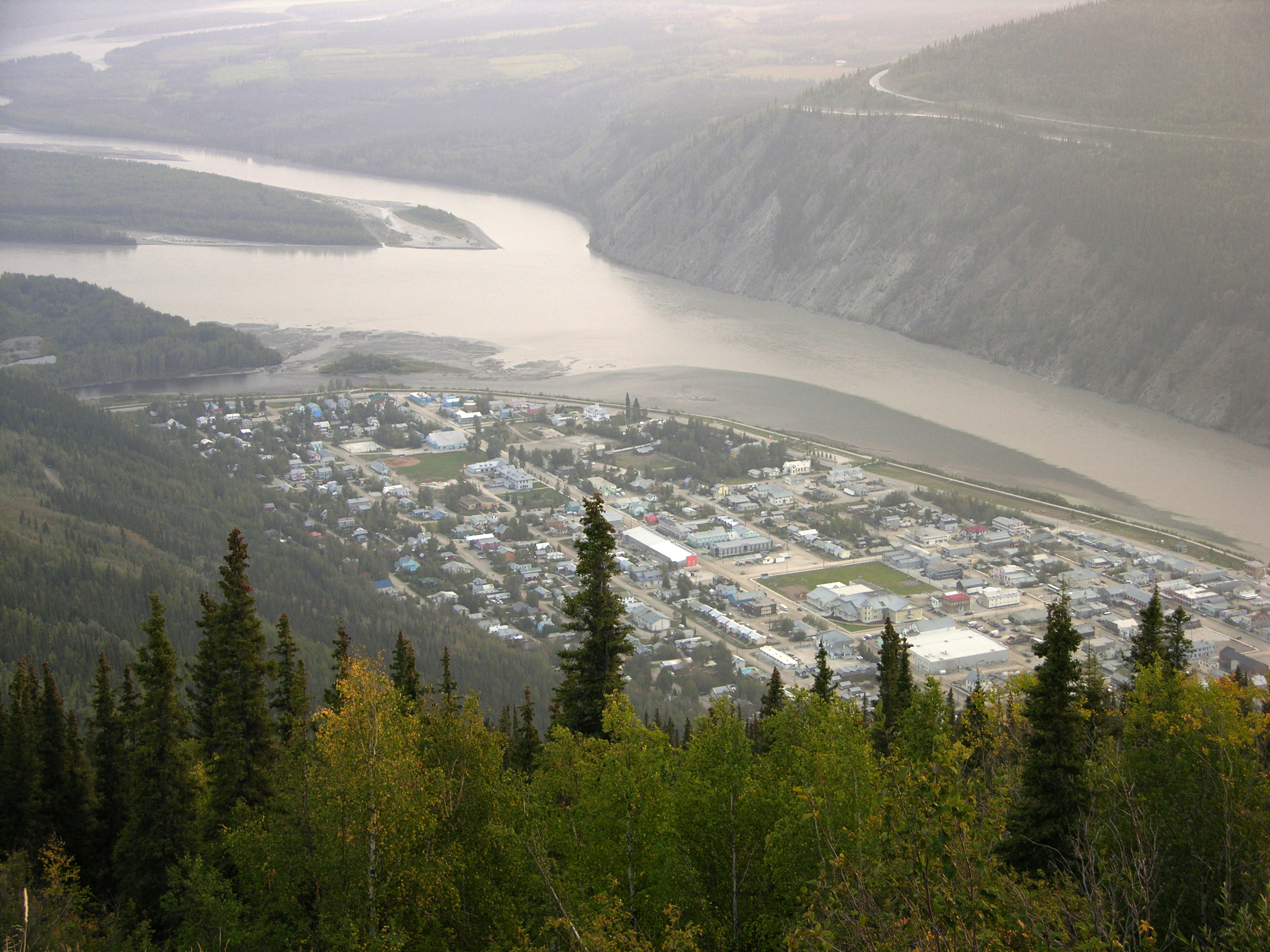
Klondike River (left) flowing into the Yukon River (top and right) at Dawson City

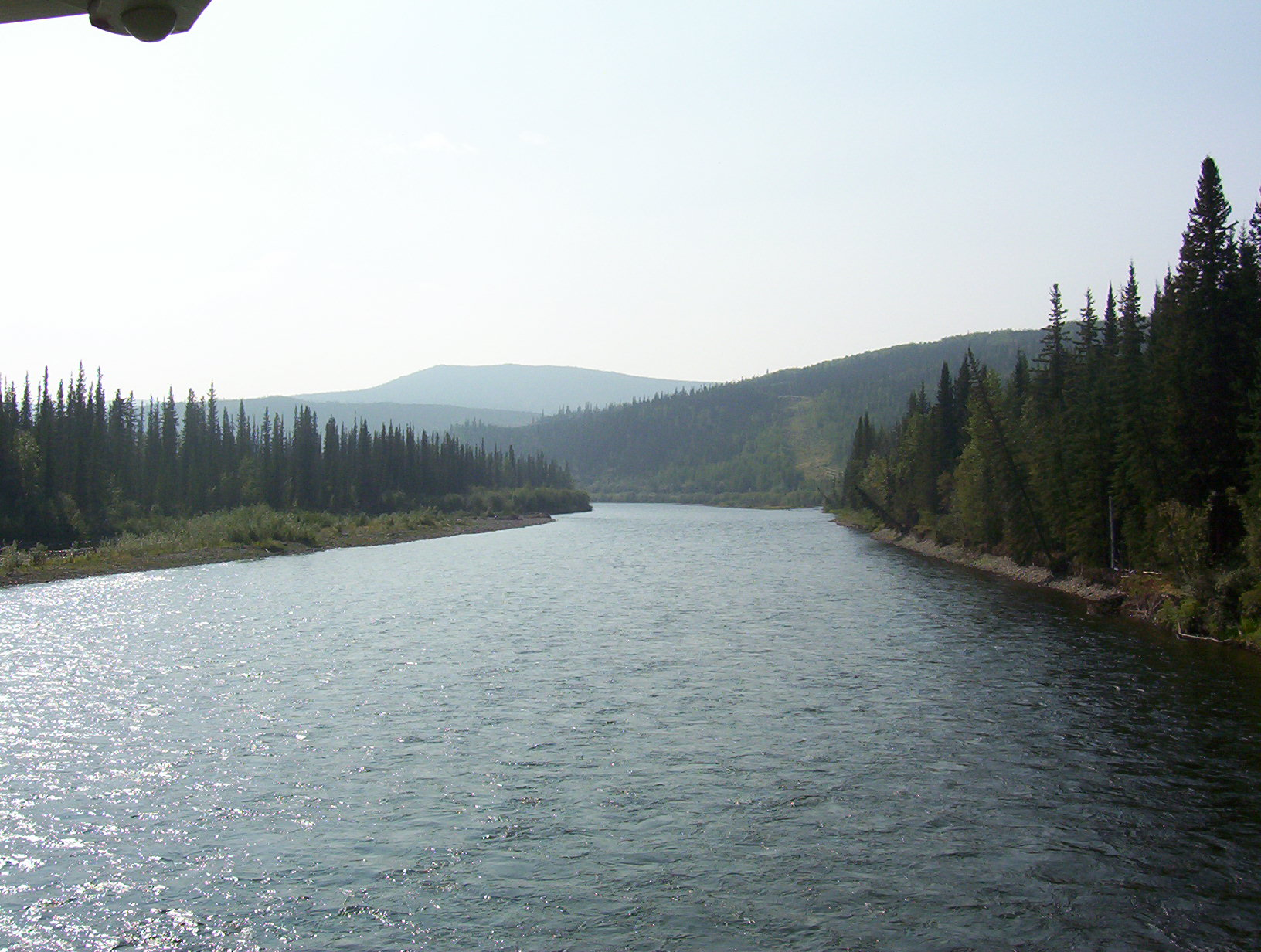
Klondike River crossing Dempster Highway (downstream)

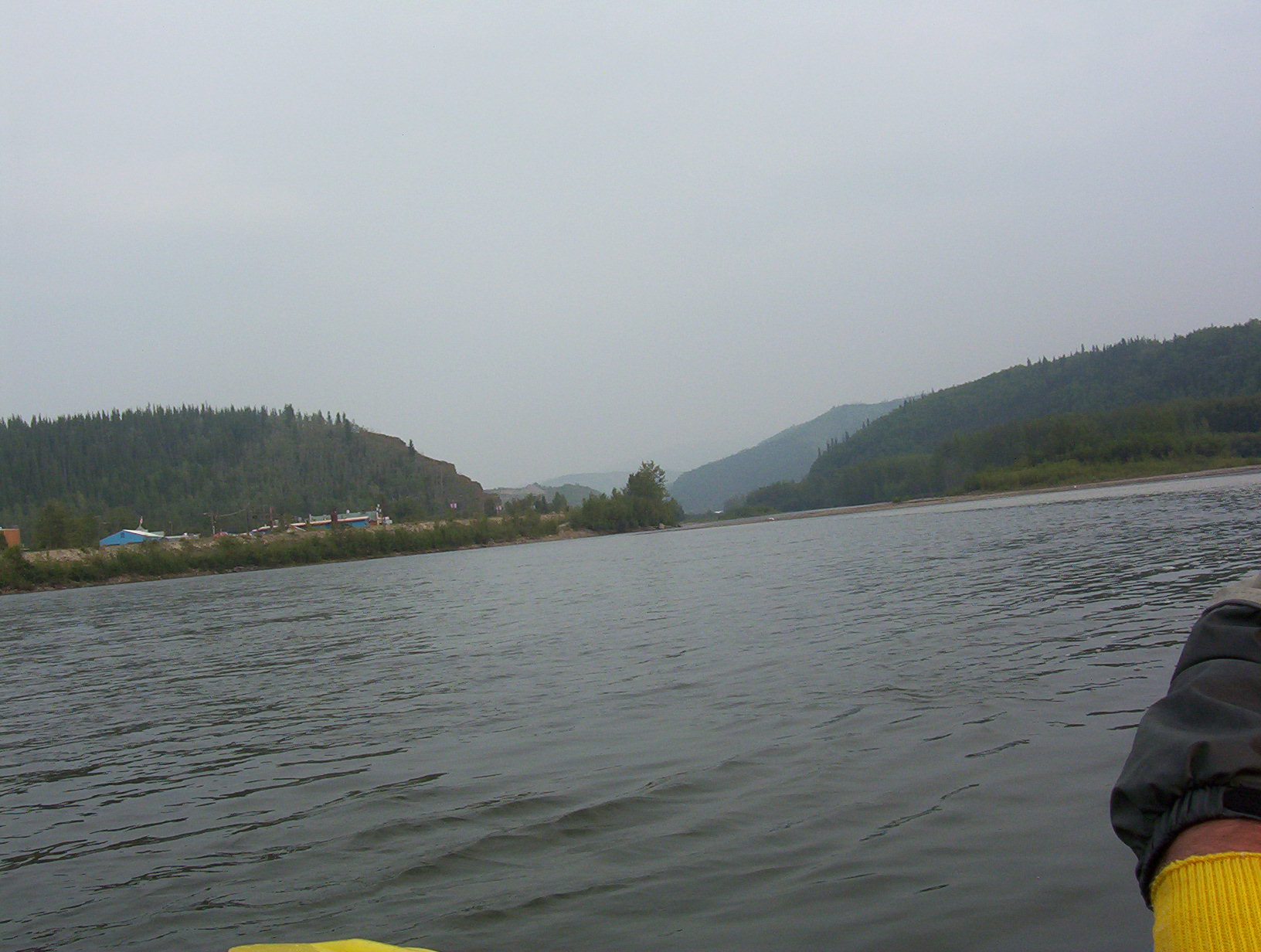
Mouth of the Klondike River to the Yukon River at Dawson City

== See also ==
- List of rivers of Yukon
