= Dawson Charlie =

Canadian First Nation gold prospector (c. 1865–1908)

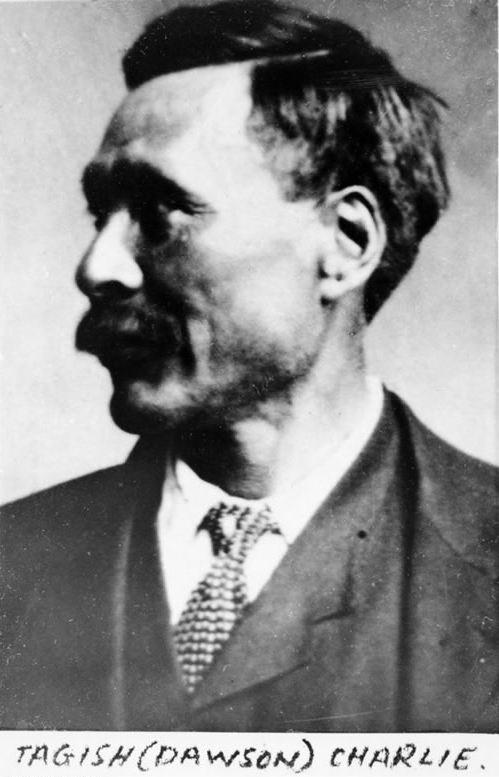

Dawson Charlie or K̲áa Goox̱ [qʰáː kuːχ] (c. 1865 – 26 December 1908) was a Canadian Tagish/Tlingit First Nation prospector and one of the co-discoverers of gold at Discovery Claim that led to the Klondike Gold Rush located in the Yukon territory of Northwest Canada. He was the nephew of Keish, also known as Skookum Jim Mason, and accompanied him on his search for his aunt, Kate Carmack. He staked one of the first three claims in the Klondike, along with his uncle and George Carmack. Storyteller Angela Sidney was a niece.

By 1901, Charlie had adopted the legal name of "Charles Henderson." There is a conflict as to Charlie's year of birth, between the information that Charlie provided during the 1901 census and the information on his tombstone. The census indicates 1864 or 1865 as his year of birth. The tombstone indicates 1866 as his year of birth.

He died in Carcross, Yukon, when he fell off the White Pass and Yukon Route railway bridge.
