= History of Yukon =

The history of Yukon covers the period from the arrival of Paleo-Indians through the Beringia land bridge approximately 20,000 years ago. In the 18th century, Russian explorers began to trade with the First Nations people along the Alaskan coast, and later established trade networks extending into Yukon. By the 19th century, traders from the Hudson's Bay Company were also active in the region. The region was administered as a part of the North-Western Territory until 1870, when the United Kingdom transferred the territory to Canada and it became the North-West Territories.

After gold was discovered in the Klondike region in 1896, the area saw a large influx of prospectors enter into the region in search of gold. Due to the large influx of prospectors into the region, the western portion of the North-West Territories was split from the rest of the territory in 1898 to form the Yukon Territory. Although the gold rush ended by the turn of the century, mining developments continued to take place in the territory during the early 20th century. During the Second World War, the Alaska Highway was built through the territory in order to facilitate the transportation of supplies to Alaska. In 1953, the capital of the territory was moved from Dawson City to Whitehorse. From the late-20th century, a number of First Nations in Yukon have entered into land claim negotiations with the government of Canada.

== Early history ==
Disputed evidence of the oldest remains of human inhabitation in North America have been found in the Yukon. A large number of apparently human-modified animal bones were discovered in the Old Crow area in the northern Yukon that have been dated to 25,000–40,000 years ago by carbon dating. The central and northern Yukon were not glaciated, as they were part of Beringia.

At about AD 800, a large volcanic eruption in Mount Churchill near the Alaska border blanketed the southern Yukon with ash. That layer of ash can still be seen along the Klondike Highway. Yukon First Nations stories speak of all the animals and fish dying as a result. Similar stories are told among the Athabaskan-speaking Navajo and Apache, leading to the conclusion by some anthropologists that the migration of Athabaskan peoples into what is now the southwestern United States could have been due to the eruption. After that, the hunting technology saw the replacement of atlatls with bows and arrows.

Extensive trading networks between the coastal Tlingits and the interior First Nations developed, where the coastal peoples would trade eulachon oil and other coastal goods for native copper and furs found in the interior. The Yukon was part of the long disappeared Beringia and hosted a wide variety of megafaunal species like steppe wisents, American lions, short-faced bears, woolly mammoths, giant beavers, American mastodons, stag-moose, ground sloths, Camelops, dire wolves, caribou, muskoxen, saiga, American cheetahs, bison, grizzly bears, Equus scotti, Equus lambei, gray wolves, and yaks.

=== First Nations ===
Geographic distribution of the Athabaskan language family. Several First Nations languages spoken in Yukon belong the Athabaskan language family.

Estimates of the population of the Yukon Territory at the beginning of the 19th century vary greatly. Some historians estimated that about 8,000 people lived in the territory. While other estimates were between 7,000 and 8,000 people. One estimate put the number at more than 9,000 people. Another estimate showed that by the year 1830, the number of indigenous people was about 4,700.

The main part of the territory of the modern Yukon was occupied by various Athabaskan tribes. In the north, in basins of Peel River and Porcupine River there lived Kutchin or as they call themselves Gwitchin. About the middle of Yukon River, on the border with Alaska, there lived the Hän people. Northern Tutchone occupied most of the central part of the Yukon, in the basins of the Pelly River and the Stewart River. The Southern Tutchone were located in the south-west part of the Yukon. In the south-east, in the basin of Liard River, there lived the Kaska Natives. In the south, near the lakes in upper courses of Yukon River, there lived the Tagish. In the south-west, in the riverheads of the White River, there lived Upper Tanana.

Besides Athabaskan, on the Arctic coast of modern Yukon, including Herschel Island, there lived the Inuit (Eskimo). And in the south, down the Teslin River, there lived continental Tlingit (Teslin) whose language together with Athabaskan languages is included into Na-Dene language family.

Covered with snow, the area around Mount Saint Elias in the extreme south-west of the Yukon was unsettled.

== 19th century ==
In the 19th century, Russian explorers began trading with the First Nations people along the Alaskan coast and later established trade networks extending into the Yukon.

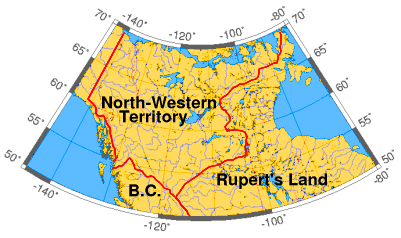
From the late-17th century to 1870, the territory was claimed as a part of British North America's North-Western Territory by the British

European incursions into what later became the Yukon started in the first half of the 19th century with the fur trade. Hudson's Bay Company explorers and traders from Mackenzie River trading posts used two different routes to enter Yukon and created trading posts along the way. The northern route started in Fort McPherson, Northwest Territories along the Mackenzie River, crossed the mountains into the Bell and Porcupine Rivers to the Yukon River. The southern route started at Fort Liard, then westward along the Liard River to Frances Lake and then along the Pelly River to its juncture with Yukon River.

After establishing Fort McPherson, John Bell crossed the mountains into Yukon River watershed in 1845, and went down the Rat River (today the Bell River) to its confluence with the Porcupine River. After managing the fur trade at Fort McPherson, he returned to the Bell River, and followed the Porcupine to its juncture with Yukon River, the eventual site of Fort Yukon. Soon after, Alexander Hunter Murray established trading posts at Lapierre House (1846) and at Fort Yukon (1847) at the juncture of the Porcupine and Yukon Rivers. Murray drew numerous sketches of fur trade posts and of people and wrote the Journal of Yukon, 1847–48, which gives valuable insight into the culture of local Gwich’in First Nation people at the time.

While the post was actually in Russian Alaska, the Hudson's Bay Company continued to trade there until expelled by the American traders in 1869, following the Alaska Purchase. A new trading post, Rampart House was established upstream along the Porcupine, but it also proved to be just inside Alaska's boundary. Gwich’in people, especially under the leadership of Sahneuti, played off the Hudson's Bay Company against American traders from the Alaska Commercial Company.

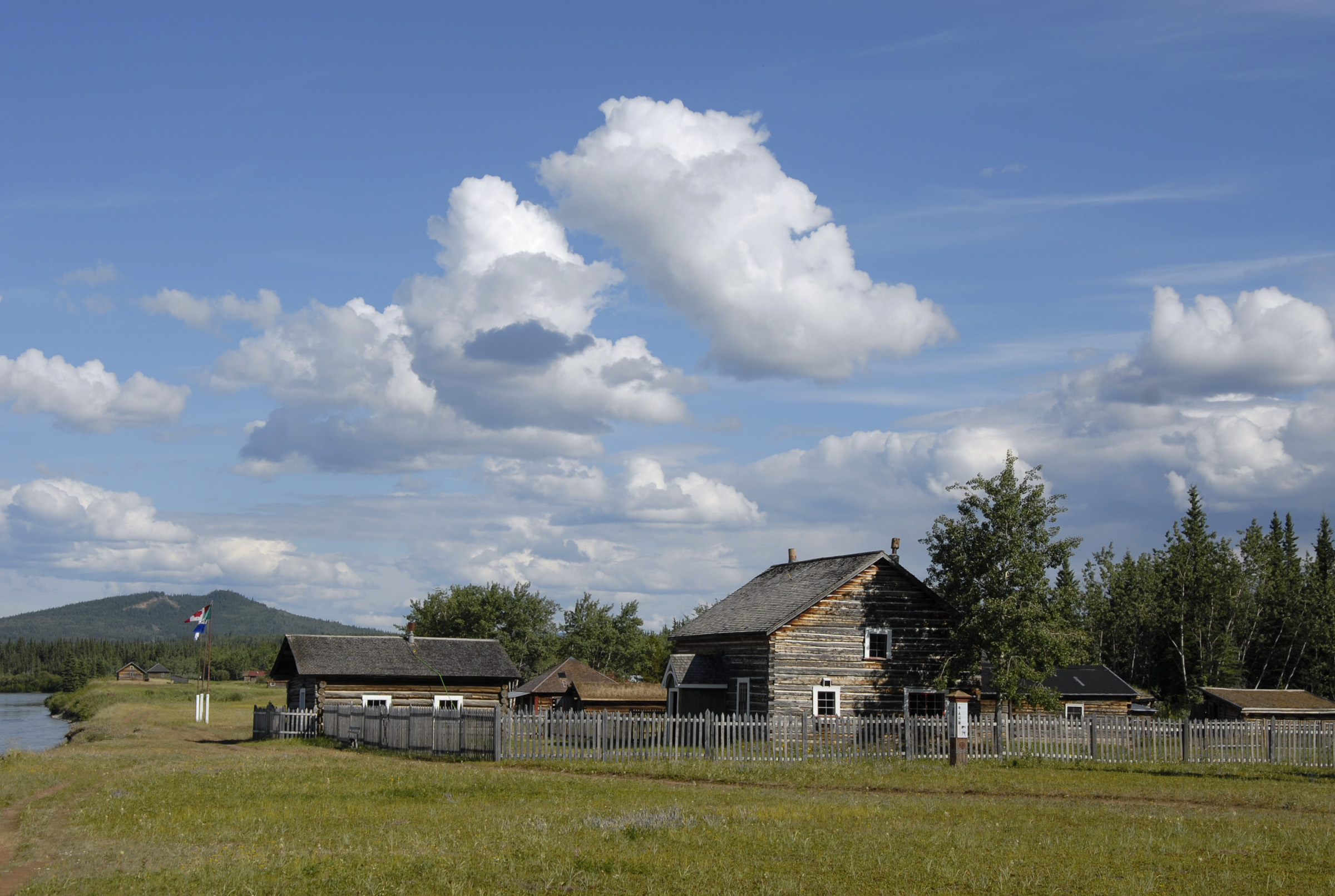
Fort Selkirk in 2006. Originally built in 1848 by the Hudson's Bay Company, it was sacked in 1852 and not rebuilt until 1889.

At about the same time, Robert Campbell, coming from Fort Simpson explored a large part of the southern Yukon and established Fort Frances (1842) on Frances Lake in the Liard River basin and Fort Selkirk, Yukon (1848) at the juncture of the Yukon River and the Pelly River. In 1852, Fort Selkirk was sacked by Tlingit warriors from the coast who objected to its interference with their trade. Fort Selkirk was abandoned and not reestablished until 1889.

Anglican and Roman Catholic missionaries followed in the wake of the fur trade. Of note is William Carpenter Bompas who became the first Anglican bishop of the Yukon. Catholic missionaries were mainly from the order of Missionary Oblates of Mary Immaculate, who still retain a presence in the Yukon today.

In 1859, Robert Kennicott set off on an expedition to collect natural history specimens in what is now the Mackenzie River and Yukon River valleys and in the Arctic tundra beyond. Kenicott became popular with Hudson's Bay Company fur traders in the area and encouraged them to collect and send natural history specimens and First Nations artifacts to the Smithsonian. In 1865 the Western Union Telegraph Expedition was mounted to find a possible route for a telegraph line between North America and Russia by way of the Bering Sea. Kennicott was the chief scientist for this expedition and the party of naturalists sent to assist him included W.H. Dall. Kennicott died of a heart attack while travelling up the Yukon River. However, Kennicott's efforts brought what is now the Yukon to the world's attention.

In 1870, the United Kingdom transferred the North-Western Territory to the government of Canada.

Rumours of the presence of gold in the area had been reported by Hudson's Bay Company traders, but little had been done about them. Following the Alaska purchase and the abandonment of Rampart house, Alaska Commercial Company traders started working along the upper Yukon River. Three miners — Alfred Mayo, Jack McQuesten, and Arthur Harper — having heard of these rumours, went to work for the Alaska Commercial Company as traders, although their main interest was in the gold prospects. In 1874, Mayo and McQuesten established Fort Reliance, a few miles downstream of what later became Dawson City. Miners and prospectors slowly trickled in, and gold was found in many areas but rarely in paying quantities.

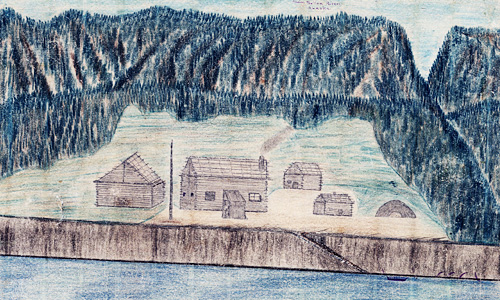
Drawing of Fort Reliance in 1884. The fort was established a decade earlier and operated intermittently as a trading post until 1886

In 1885, a paying amount of gold was found on the Stewart River, and McQuesten convinced the Alaska Commercial Company to start catering to miners rather than focusing only on the fur trade. The following year, paying quantities of coarse gold were found on the Fortymile River, and a new trading post, Forty Mile, Yukon was established at the confluence of the Fortymile with the Yukon River.

At the same time as the initial gold discoveries were being made, the US Army sent lieutenant Frederick Schwatka to reconnoiter the Yukon River. Going over the Chilkoot Pass, his party built rafts and floated down the Yukon River to its mouth in the Bering Sea, naming many geographic features along the way. Schwatka's expedition alarmed the Canadian government, who then sent an expedition under George Mercer Dawson in 1887. William Ogilvie, a surveyor who was later to become famous during the Klondike gold Rush and was part of Dawson's expedition, surveyed the boundary with Alaska.

In 1894, concerned about the influx of American miners and the liquor trade, the Canadian government sent inspector Charles Constantine of the North-West Mounted Police to examine conditions in the Yukon district.

In 1895, the Yukon District was carved out of the North-West Territories. With the rapid population increase due to the gold rush, three years later on 13 June 1898, the Yukon became its own territory called the Yukon Territory with the passing of the Yukon Act.

=== Klondike Gold Rush ===
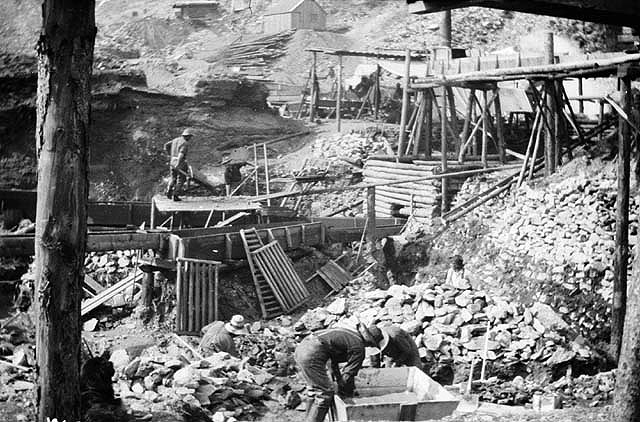
Mining operation at Bonanza Creek during the Klondike Gold Rush

The Klondike Gold Rush was the seminal event in the Yukon's history. A party led by Skookum Jim Mason discovered gold in Bonanza Creek, a tributary of the Klondike River, in August 1896. An estimated 30,000 to 40,000 people braved numerous hardships to reach the Klondike gold fields in the winter and spring of 1897–1898 after the discovery became known in 1897. With the influx of American stampeders, the Canadian government decided to create a separate territory to better control the situation.

In 1901, after many had gone back, the census put the population of the territory at 27,219, a figure that was not reached again until 1991. The influx of people greatly stimulated mineral exploration in other parts of the Yukon and led to two subsidiary gold rushes in Atlin, British Columbia and Nome, Alaska as well as a number of mini-rushes. Transportation needs to the gold fields led to the construction of the White Pass and Yukon Route.

== 20th century ==
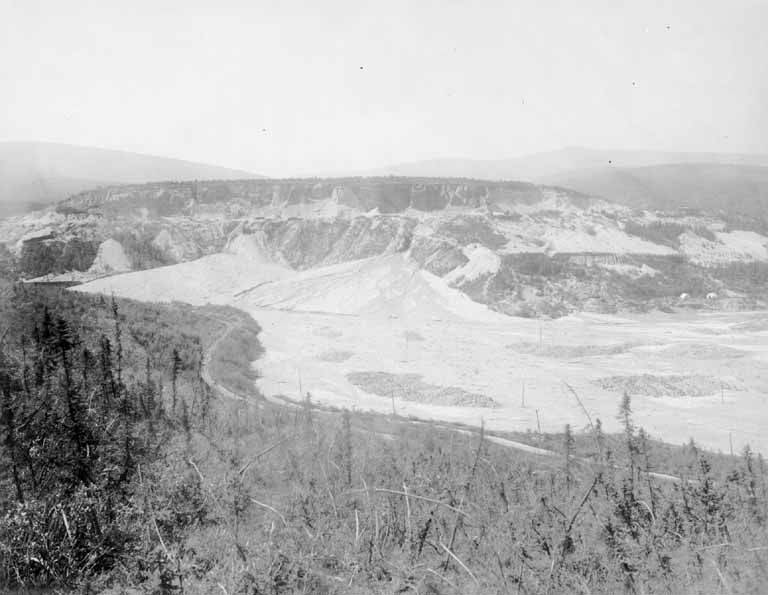
A mining operation near Dawson City in 1914.

Around the start of the 20th century the US Army began the construction of a telegraph line which ran through Tanacross, crossing the Tanana River at a place called Tanana Crossing. The line continued northward, past the village of Ketchumstuck, and the forked, one branch going west to Fairbanks and the other to the military post at Eagle. The direct impact of the line was brief, however, since by 1915 the greater part was abandoned and by 1926 only 11 miles remained. In 1912 the Protestant Episcopal Church purchased the telegraph installation at Tanana Crossing and established St. Timothy's mission.

After the gold rush, the population of the territory declined precipitously, reaching a low of 4,157 in 1921 and remained fairly steady until the 1940s. This was despite the development of other mining areas including silver in Conrad, and especially near Mayo, gold in the Kluane Lake area, and copper near Whitehorse. In the Klondike, individual miners' claims were bought out and consolidated with the help of the government by a small number of companies, including the Guggenheim's Yukon Gold Corporation who used large floating dredges. The Yukon Consolidated Gold Company continued to dredge for gold until the 1960s. A brief period of prosperity ensued during the 1930s when the price of gold rose.

By 1920, the elected territorial council had been reduced to three members and the territory was directly ruled by the Gold commissioner, a federal civil servant reporting to the Minister of the Interior.

The next important event in Yukon's history was the construction of the Alaska Highway during the Second World War, which, after its badly needed reconstruction by the Canadian Government in the late 1940s, opened up the territory to road traffic. The Alaska Highway has played an extremely important role in the acculturation of the people. Today, the highway remains a scenic and well-maintained route throughout the year. The war also saw the construction of a number of airfields as part of the Northwest Staging Route. However, the influx of southern highway construction crews had a devastating effect on some First Nations, who suffered from a large number of deaths from diseases to which they had no immunity.

On 1 April 1953, the capital of the territory was moved from Dawson City to Whitehorse.

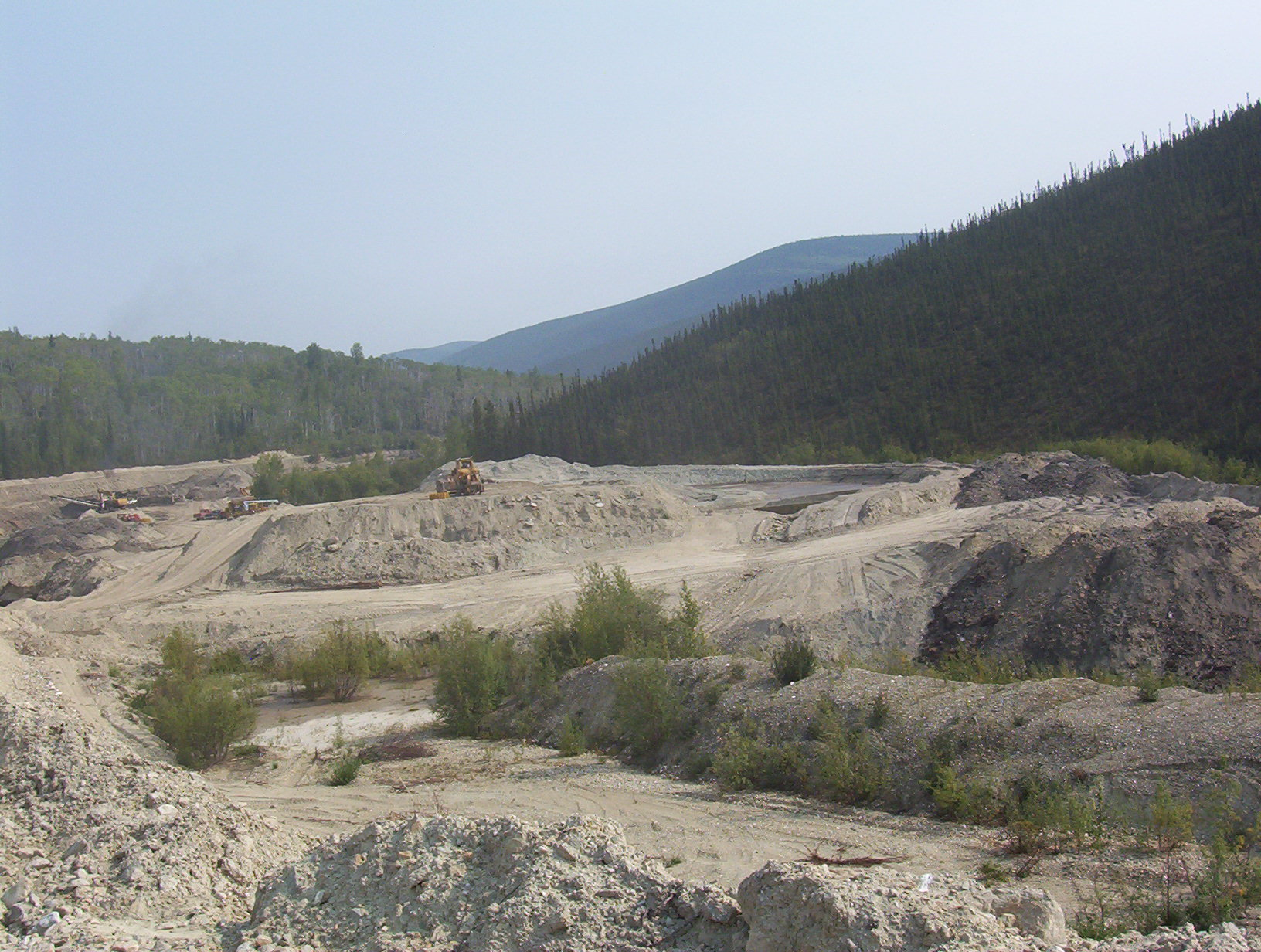
Gold mining operation in Klondike in 2005. Mining operations resumed in the Klondike during the 1970s.

Other highways were built during the 1950s and 1960s, resulting in the decline and disappearance of the riverboats that had provided the main means of transportation until the 1960s. In the 1950s, the White Pass & Yukon Route pioneered the use of intermodal containerized shipping. Mining activity also revived, including copper mining in Whitehorse, silver and lead in Keno and Elsa, asbestos in Clinton Creek. The world's largest open-pit zinc and lead mine was opened in Faro in the early 1970s. Gold mining came back to the Klondike and other areas with the large rise in gold prices in the late 1970s.

In the 1980s and 1990s, mining declined and the role of government increased considerably with larger and larger transfers from the federal government. In 1978, party politics was introduced to the Yukon Legislative Assembly. In October 1979, responsible government was granted by Minister Jake Epp. On another front, First Nations started lobbying and entered in land claims negotiations in the 1970s which culminated in the signing of an "Umbrella Final Agreement" in 1992. Although most First Nations have signed agreements, land claims and self-government negotiations are still going on today. The First Nations are now considered a fourth level of government and the specific nature of inter-governmental relationships is still being worked out. Today, the Canadian government is investing in clean energy research and environmental protection in the territory, with one of the goals being the increased involvement of the First Nations, Inuit and Métis peoples in the northern economy.

== 21st-century ==
In 2003, the Yukon Territory underwent a name change as the words the and Territory were officially dropped from the name. Unofficially, both in the Yukon government and amongst its people, the is still recognised and used.

Yukon was affected by the COVID-19 pandemic and the lockdowns instituted in response thereto.
