= Gordon C. Bettles =

Canadian-American businessman and prospector (1859–1945)

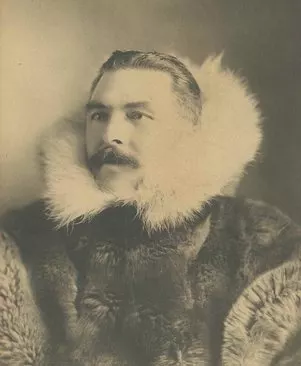
- Gordon Bettles, c. 1898
- Born: 1859; Canada East
- Died: 18 May 1945 (age 86); Seattle, Washington
- Occupations: Businessman, prospector
- Years active: 1888–1928
- Known for: Establishment of Bettles, Alaska

Gordon Charles Bettles (1859 – 18 May 1945) was a Canadian-American fur trader, shopkeeper, prospector, and newspaperman active in 19th century Interior Alaska. He established the trading post that would become Bettles, Alaska. He referred to himself as the "Rat-skin-and-bean trader of the North".

== Early life and career ==
Bettles was born in Canada East in 1859. He had worked as a compositor at the Detroit Free Press in his youth. He began mining in Colorado from 1882 to 1884, and later worked as a prospector and cowboy in Montana, Idaho, and Washington from 1884 to 1886. This included stints driving a packtrain to Coeur d'Alene and mining at Libby Creek, Montana.

In 1888, Bettles was twenty-seven years old and eager to make his fortune. He had been mining for silver in Montana, but he abandoned his claims when he heard about a gold discovery on the Fortymile River in what was then Canada's North-West Territories. He headed north, and found his first job in Alaska at the Treadwell gold mine. Although a decade would pass before the great Klondike Gold Rush, Bettles joined a group of sixty men who scaled Chilkoot Pass to travel the upper stretches of the Yukon River in rough boats. Before they found gold at the mouth of the Fortymile, twenty of Bettle's party had given up and returned home.

For several months, Bettles traveled through Fortymile country using a portable sluice box called a "rocker" to wash $50 per day from streambed gravel. However, as soon as he caught wind of prospects on the Kuskokwim River, he and a partner left in search of gold and adventure. After a long winter and no signs of gold, Bettles returned to the Yukon River.

== Entrepreneurship ==
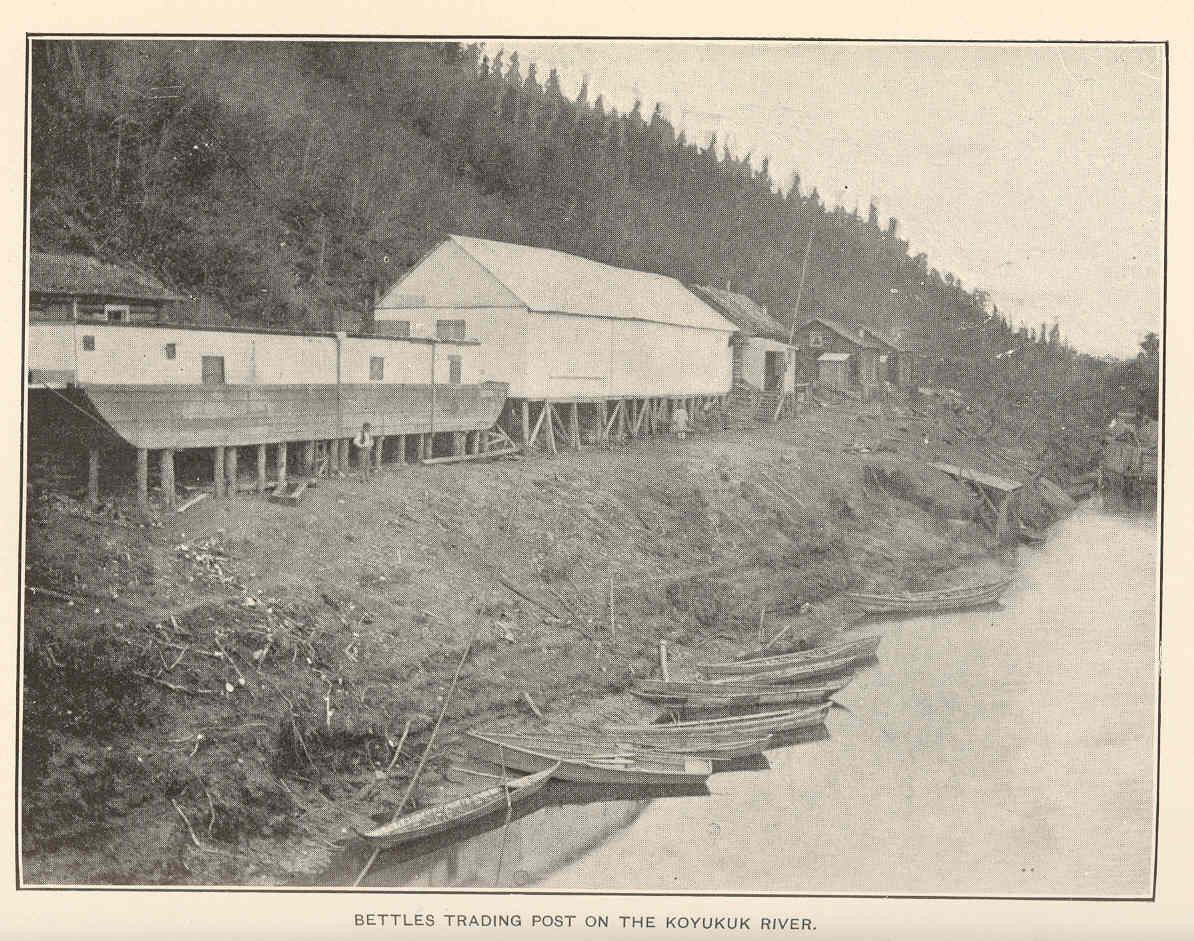
Bettles Trading Post on the Koyukuk River, 1904

=== Tanana River ===
In partnership with the fur trader Alfred Mayo, Bettles started a trading station near the confluence of the Tanana River. This was the beginning of his career as a shopkeeper and entrepreneur in some of Alaska's most remote gold fields. He opened a store at a trading area known as Nukluklayet with Arthur Harper.

=== Arctic Village ===
By 1890 a group of miners discovered gold on Koyukuk tributaries north of the Arctic Circle, and Bettles responded by forming G.C. Bettles & Co. and ordered 20 tons of supplies. "From a pickaxe to a candle" was the company's motto in newspaper ads. Four years later he opened a store, or "beanshop" as the miners called them, at a place along the Koyukuk he called Arctic Village. Business was slow in the early years because only a handful of men were willing to brave harsh winters and prospect the frozen Koyukuk gravel bars. In addition to running his store, Bettles owned the Yukon River steamboats, the Cora and the Koyukuk, and traded with Alaska Native trappers for the furs of marten, red and silver fox, beaver, and mink. Early in his career as a shopkeeper, Bettles earned a reputation for generosity because he freely offered miners a "grubstake" of food and supplies that they could pay back when they found their gold.

=== Bergman and Bettles ===
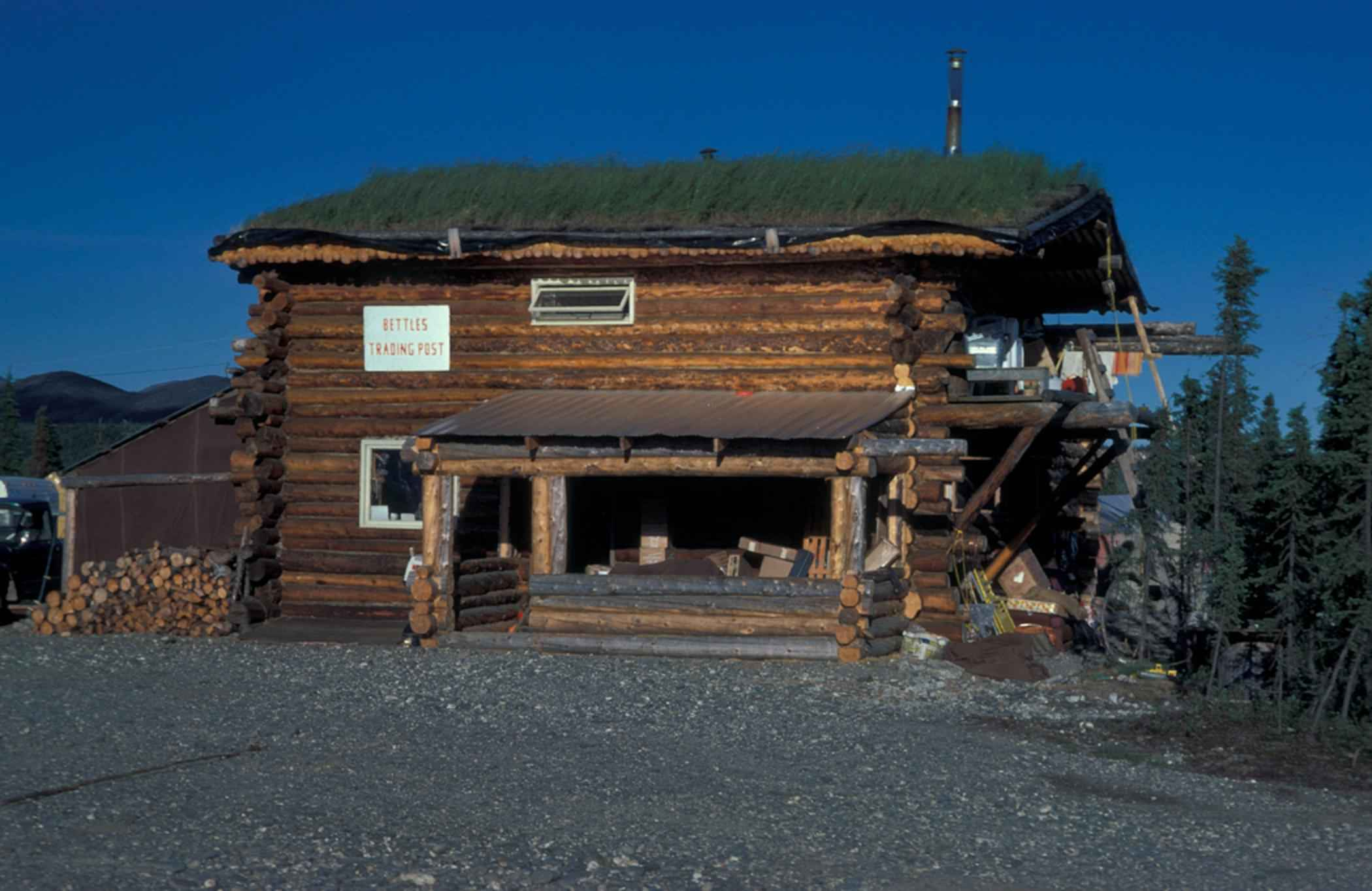
Contemporary trading post in Bettles, 2013

In 1898, five years after Bettles first reported on the Koyukuk, the overflow from the famous Klondike Gold Rush sent two thousand gold-hungry prospectors to Koyukuk country. Wherever their steamboats stopped the miners built log cabin camps and started digging. Responding quickly to the new opportunity, Bettles established the outpost of Bergman and another store farther north he called Bettles. By spring 1899, the prospectors' gold fever had faded and only one hundred miners remained, but the Koyukuk mining district held on with additional gold discoveries in 1906 and 1909.

Beginning in 1901 the tiny settlement of Bettles had a post office and continued to serve local miners, but by the 1930s most of the residents had moved on to Wiseman or, a decade later, to the new Navy airfield seven miles upriver (the town that grew around the airfield was also called Bettles).

== Yukon Press ==
Bettles volunteered to help Jules Louis Prevost in the publication of the Yukon Press in 1894, the first newspaper in the Yukon River region. In the paper's first edition, he warned eager prospectors that a full season of back-breaking labor was needed on the Koyukuk before they might have a hope of seeing profit.

== Later career ==
By 1912, Bettles had opened a fish cannery and was prospecting for quartz on the Kuskokwim River. In 1925, he was "accredited with the greatest cinnabar discovery the world has ever known" near Bethel, Alaska. In 1928, he had discovered substantial platinum deposits near Goodnews Bay, Alaska.

== Personal life ==
Bettles had a brother, James. In 1892, Bettles married Sophia Kokrine, daughter of a Yukon River trader from Russia, and started a family. Sophia was aunt-in-law to Effie Kokrine. Bettles had a daughter, Marguerite Bettles Golder. The family moved down to Fairbanks in 1906 where Marguerite graduated from school. Sophia died in 1920 at the age of 46.

In 1890, Bettles was among the vigilante party that executed the Koyukuk Indian who killed John Bremner.

Bettles was a popular and well known man of the Alaskan frontier. It was said that he was "famed for his live imagination, his good nature, his liberality, his great friendliness," and his "capability for telling good stories." He became a charter member of the Yukon Order of Pioneers, an organization formed to bring order and ethical conduct to the emerging gold camps.

Bettles died in Seattle, Washington on 18 May 1945 at age 86.

== Legacy ==
The Bettles River was named in his honor in 1899. Besides the city of Bettles, the outposts established by Gordon Bettles have since become ghost towns or have disappeared entirely.
