= Émilie Fortin Tremblay =

Émilie Tremblay
- Born: Marie-Émilie Fortin; January 4, 1872; Hébertville, Notre-Dame-d'Hébertville Quebec
- Died: April 21, 1949 (aged 77); Victoria, British Columbia

Émilie Tremblay (née, Marie-Émilie Fortin; January 4, 1872 – April 21, 1949) was one of the first white women to cross the Chilkoot on the way to the Yukon gold fields. She was French-Canadian and the founder, and first president, of the Society of the Ladies of the Golden North. She was also president of the Yukon Order of Pioneers Auxiliary. A businesswoman, she owned and operated a store in the Yukon in what is now a heritage building.

== Biography ==
Tremblay was born in 1872 in Hébertville, (Notre-Dame-d'Hébertville) Quebec. Her father, Cleophas Fortin, moved the French-Canadian Catholic family to Chicoutimi; her mother was a school teacher. Tremblay received her education at the grammar school associated with the Sisters of the Congregation of St-Roch convent. Her family moved to Cohoes, New York around 1887. It is there that, in 1893, she met and married Pierre-Nolasque "Jack" Tremblay (died July 16, 1935). He was from Chicoutimi, but had made a fortune on a mining claim at Miller Creek.

"Thanks to God the profession of explorers has not been, even in the North, the lot of men alone." – Émilie Tremblay

After honeymooning, they traveled over 5,000 miles before reaching Fortymile on June 16, 1894. She was one of the first white woman to cross the Chilkoot on the way to the Yukon gold fields, years before the Klondike Gold Rush. They made their home at Miller Creek in a one-room log cabin that had been previously occupied by miners. Glass bottles served as window panes. They grew radishes and lettuce on the sod roof which they had turned into a garden. They returned to Cohoes in November 1895, then travelled to Quebec City and Montreal, before returning to Cohoes where Tremblay nursed her sick mother for two years. In March 1898, they left again for the Yukon, settling in Bonanza. Jack prospected from 1898 to 1913, earning enough to be well off but not rich, allowing them to travel through Europe for several months. The couple had no children, but adopted a niece, Emily.

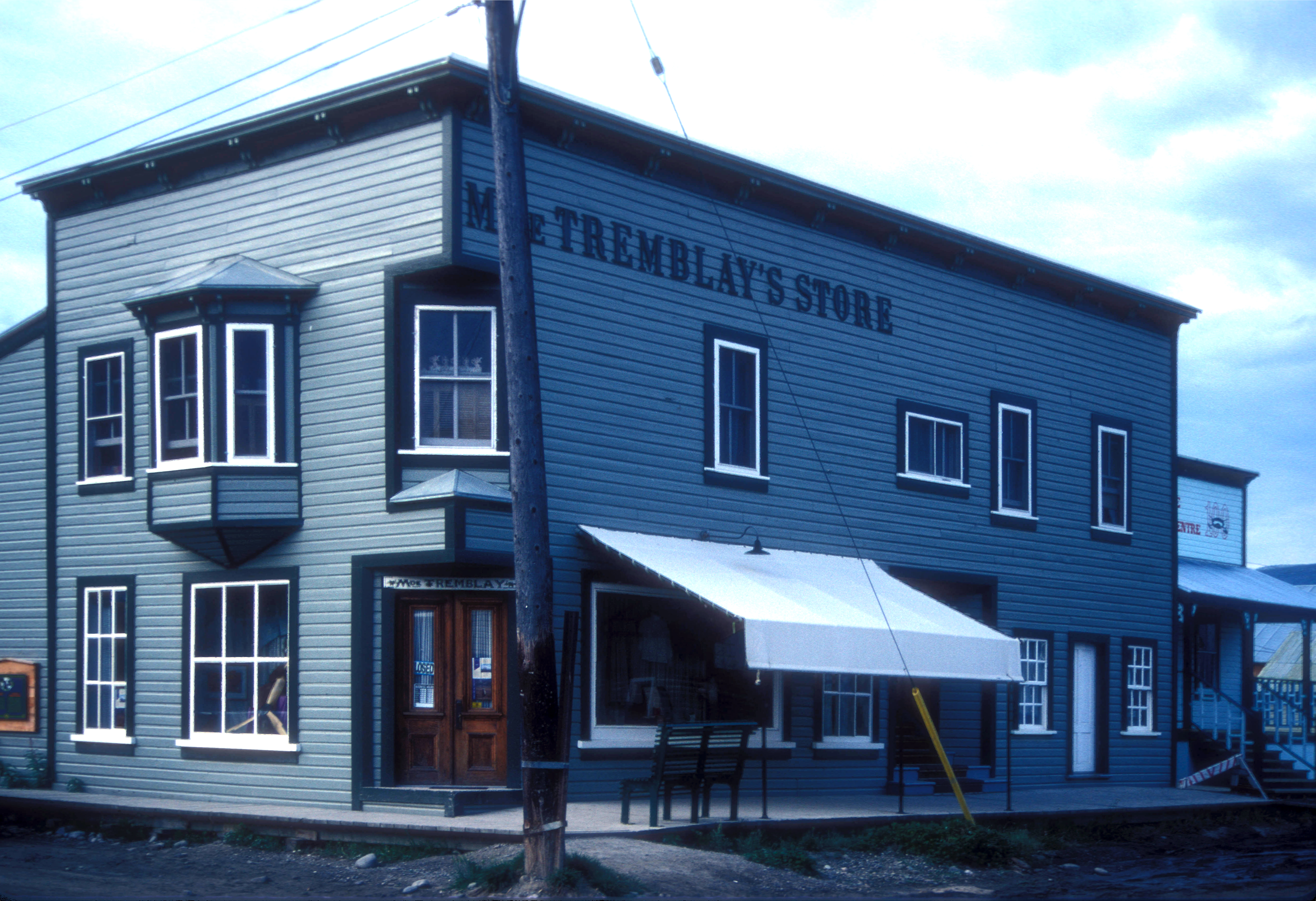
The building, constructed in 1899, became Mme Tremblay's Store in 1913.

In 1913, after Jack's retirement, the couple moved to Dawson. Here, they bought a building at the corner of King Street and Third Avenue, and Tremblay opened a dry goods shop, "Madame Tremblay's", while they lived in the apartment above. This store is now a heritage building. In 1922, Tremblay founded and was the first president of the Society of the Ladies of the Golden North, and in 1927, she served as president of the Yukon Order of Pioneers Auxiliary.

After Jack's death in 1935, Tremblay traveled to Vancouver to attend the "Ladies of the Golden North" convention, and to Quebec City where she received honors from the Imperial Order of the Daughters of the Empire, of which she was a life member. She was honoured with a lifetime membership and received a commemorative medal in 1937 at the coronation of King George VI. She traveled to Saguenay, Quebec where she described her adventures, and then to New York City, before returning to the Yukon to sell her shop. In 1940, at the age of 67, Tremblay married the gold miner Louis Lagrois, six years her elder, moving with him to a log cabin at Grand Forks. In August 1946, she visited San Francisco to attend the annual convention of the former Yukon Pioneers. Her last years were spent in a retirement home in Victoria, British Columbia where she died in 1949. The first francophone school in the Yukon, Ecole Emilie-Tremblay, is named in her honor.
