= Noochuloghoyet =

Former trading post and populated place in Alaska

Noochuloghoyet Nucha'la'woy'ya
- Trading post
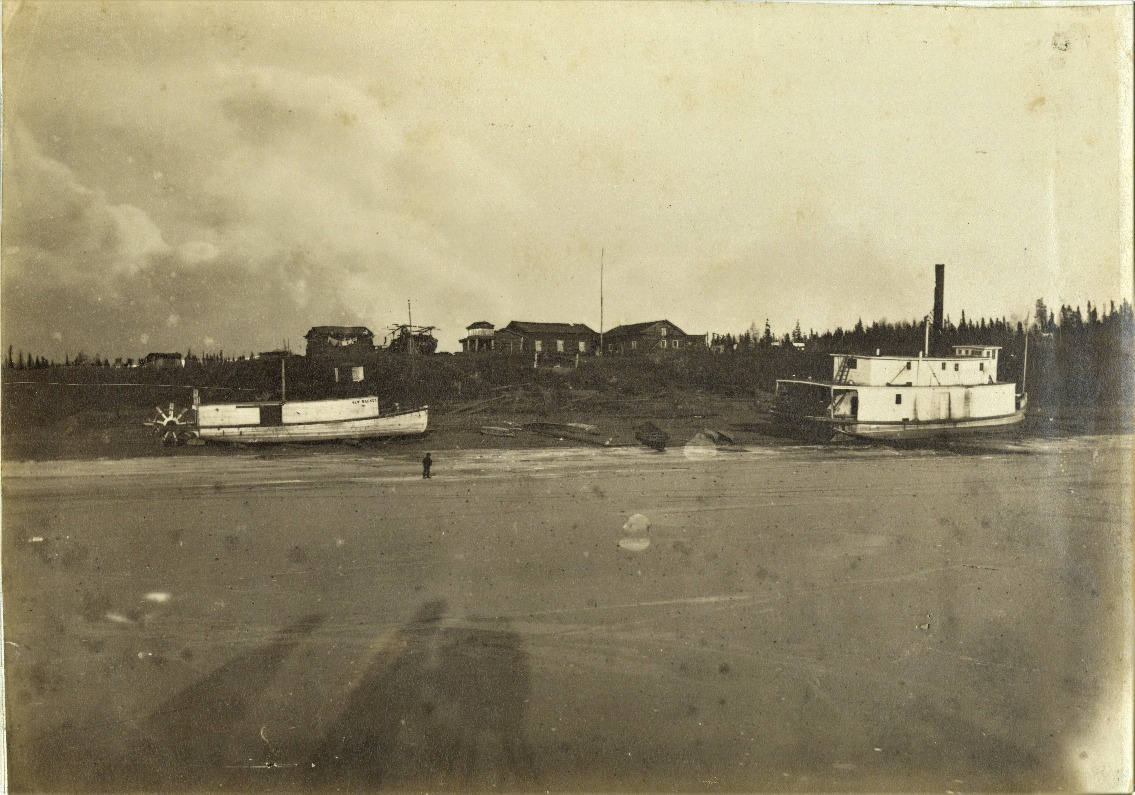
- New river ice at Noochuloghoyet with two grounded steam ships, c.1884
- Interactive map of Noochuloghoyet
- Coordinates: 65.16486°N 151.95422°W; Location of Noochuloghoyet Point
- Country: United States of America
- State: Alaska
- Census Area: Yukon–Koyukuk Census Area, Alaska
- White settlement: 1868
- Founder: François Xavier Mercier (formally)

Government
  - Type: Corporate
  - Body: Alaska Commercial Company

Population (1890)
  - Total: 120

Noochuloghoyet, commonly spelled Nuklukayet (from Nucha'la'woy'ya, lit. 'where the two rivers meet'), (Note: There are many other name variations, including: Nukluklayet, Nukluroyit, Nuclavyette, Nukiukahyet, Nuklukait, Nuklaciyat, Nuklukyat, Tuklukyet, and Noukelakayet) was a populated place and trading location near Noochuloghoyet Point at the confluence of the Yukon and Tanana Rivers in the state of Alaska. It was relocated several times in the late 19th century.

== History ==
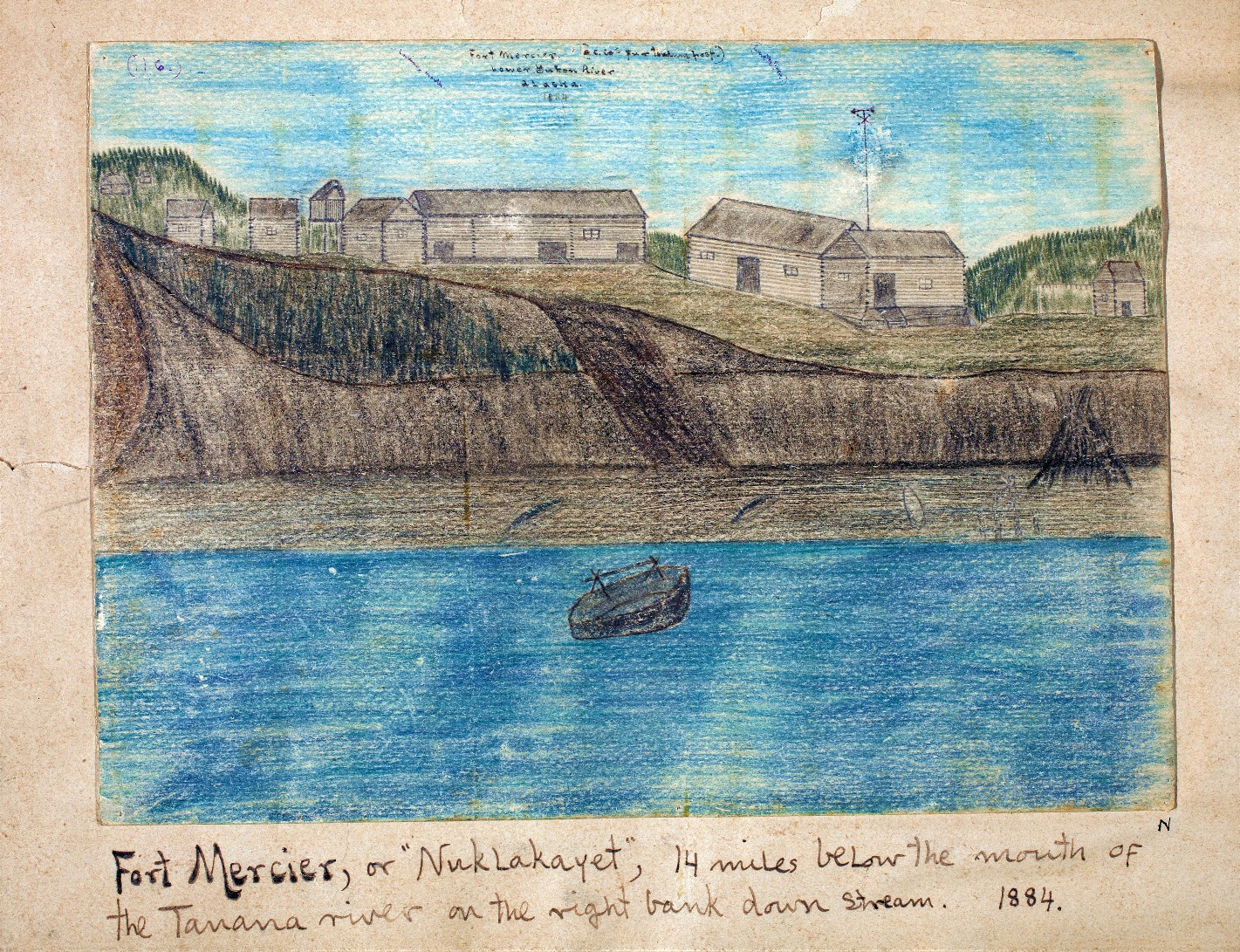
Willis E. Everette’s drawing of Nuklukayet, 1884

=== Early history ===
Noochuloghoyet Point was originally a meeting place for Indigenous tribes to celebrate the arrival of spring. The Tanana Athabaskans, Koyukon, Gwich'in, and Northern Tutchone all met to trade at this location. It was considered neutral ground, where men from various tribes would arrive in birch-bark canoes. By 1861, Russian traders began to visit the area each spring to sell furs.

=== Formal trading post establishment ===
In 1868, François Xavier Mercier, later of the Alaska Commercial Company, established a formal trading post called Noochuloghoyet. The location of the post was on the mouth of the Tozitna River, over 20 kilometres (12 mi) away from Noochuloghoyet Point. The location was sometimes referred to as "Fort Mercier" after the founder, and also "Fort Adams". It was a popular stop for steamboat traders, and was the home for prospectors in the region. It was frequented by traders and frontiersmen such as Arthur Harper, Jack McQuesten, and Alfred Mayo.

Bishop Isidore Clut arrived at Noochuloghoyet in 1873 and performed the first Catholic mass and baptism in Alaska. It was the location of the region's first Catholic burial in 1878. As such, the post was considered the "cradle of the Catholic faith on Alaskan soil".^{:288}

=== Relocations and later years ===
In 1877, a second trading post, also called Noochuloghoyet, was established by the Western Fur and Trading Company about 2 kilometres (1.2 mi) up the Tozitna. In 1880, it had a population of 2 whites and 27 Athabaskans. The Western Fur and Trading Company was bought out by the Alaska Commercial Company, and the second Noochuloghoyet was dismantled in 1883. That year, the original Noochuloghoyet was moved a short distance downriver to higher ground by Arthur Harper. This location was also known as "Tanana Station". At this time, it was considered the "most important trading post on the Yukon River".

Between 1888 and 1892, the settlement was called "Walker's Post" after the trader put in charge by the Alaska Commercial Company. The 1890 census reported 120 people in 36 households. Gordon Bettles took control after 1892.

In 1896, the company moved the trading post to be closer to Tanana. The post was abandoned in the early 20th century. Archaeological excavations and analyses of the region were performed in 1986.
