= Miller Creek (Sixtymile River tributary) =

Stream in Yukon, Canada

Coordinates: 63.9883°N 140.8003°W

Miller Creek is a stream in Yukon, Canada.

== Geography ==
The length of Miller Creek from its junction with Sixtymile River, a tributary of the Yukon River, is about 6.5 miles (10.5 km), and its course is nearly straight. The gradient of its bed is considerable, as is the case with all other streams in this region, and this gradient increases slightly toward the head of the creek. At the extreme head, the slope becomes very steep, the angle nearly corresponding with that of the sides of the valley farther down. In general the valley is V-shaped, but at the head it widens and shows a tendency to assume a more curved, or U-shaped, outline in cross-section, thus suggesting a glacial amphitheater or cirque. It is indeed probably to ice action that this broadening and flattening is due. In the winter ice and snow accumulate and have a tendency to move from the dividing ridge down the steep slopes which the rapidly cutting stream has left. During the spring months, when the ice is softening and melting, the head of the valley is occupied by a veritable though small and transient glacier. The rounding of the head of the valley and its gradual alteration into the form of a cirque is due in part to the moving of the ice, but perhaps more largely to the erosion of the glacial waters, which are distributed over the whole width of the valley instead of being concentrated in its bottom, as are the streams that have no dependence upon ice. As the ice melts, great furrows and ditches are formed on the glacier, and the water flowing from these and falling over the ice front forms waterfalls which churn up the gravel and carry it down the valley, so that the bed rock is often laid bare. As the front of the ice recedes, this vigorous erosion is brought to bear upon successively higher parts of the valley. This action was of economic importance, since it prevents accumulations of auriferous gravels within areas in which it operates—a fact which was proved by prospecting. Miller and Glacier creeks flow into Sixtymile. The drainage areas of Sixtymile and Fortymile rivers are separated by a ridge of moderate height, whose top is comparatively flat and forms part of the general plateau in which the streams have excavated their deep valleys in late geological time.

== History ==
Miller Creek was first prospected immediately after the first discovery of gold in this region, which was about 1887, on Franklin Gulch. In 1898, it was reported that few years earlier, it was the busiest spot on the Upper Yukon. In the winter of 1895-90 there were about 500 miners in this vicinity, mostly on Miller Creek, but in the spring more than half of that number left for the diggings on Birch Creek, so that the entire number of men working in the district at the time it was visited (in July, 1896) was only about 200. It is on Miller Creek, however, that the richest strike made at the time in the Yukon diggings was that by John Miiller, who cleared from one claim of 500 feet along the bed of the gulch a sum which was variously estimated at $30,000 to $50,000 as the result of the work of two winters and one summer.

== Notable people ==
- Émilie Fortin Tremblay (1872-1949), one of the first white women to cross the Chilkoot on the way to the Yukon gold fields lived at Miller Creek.
