= Lucille Hunter =

American pioneer

Lucille Hunter (c. 1878 - 1972) was an American pioneer in Canada.

Hunter was born in Michigan, United States and migrated to Canada to escape United States’ Jim Crow laws. At age 19 and nine months pregnant, she and her husband, Charles Hunter, traveled to Yukon through the Stikeline River Trail. They stopped at a village where she birthed her daughter, Teslin, whom she named after the village’s lake. The family reached Dawson City in late 1897 and staked a Bonanza Creek claim in February 1898.

By 1939 both her daughter and her husband were dead. Her husband died in 1939, leaving Hunter alone with her grandson Buster to manage three gold mines, and a silver mine located 140 kilometres from them. Soon after WWII, she managed a laundromat in Whitehorse.

Due to her perseverance as a Black female miner, Hunter was granted honorary membership by the Yukon Order of Pioneers, making her the first Black member and the first woman. Hunter died in 1972 at age 94.
