= Mount Harper (disambiguation) =

Mount Harper may refer to:

- Mount Harper in the Ogilvie Mountains, Yukon Territory, Canada
- Mount Harper (New Zealand) in the Black Range, Canterbury, New Zealand
- Mount Harper / Mahaanui in Canterbury, New Zealand
- Mount Harper (Antarctica) in the Neptune Range, Pensacola Mountains, Antarctica
