= Sixtymile River =

River in the United States and Canada

Coordinates: 63.5619°N 139.7668°W

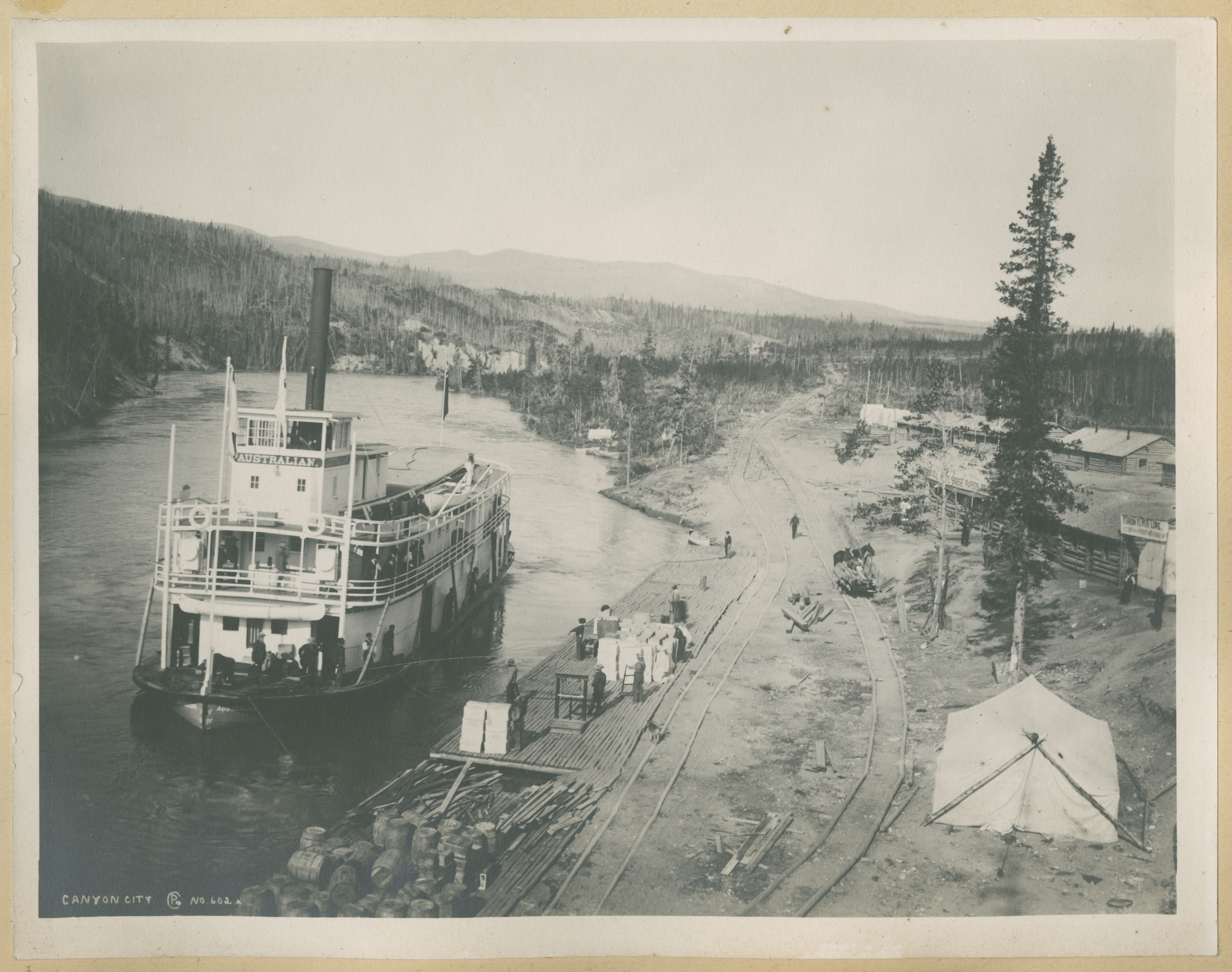
Steamboat Australian on the Sixtymile River circa 1899, during the Klondike Gold Rush.

Sixtymile River (also "Sixtymile Creek") (Hän: Khel ndek) is a tributary of the Yukon River, which heads in the U.S. state of Alaska before crossing into Yukon, Canada.

== Geography ==
This stream heads in Alaska and has a length, after crossing into Canadian territory measured along the valley, of about 70 miles (110 km), and following the windings of the stream, of about 125 miles (201 km) in total. Its fall, measured roughly with the barometer, from the boundary to the Yukon, amounts to 1,425 feet (434 m), and the average grade of the valley to a little over 20 feet (6.1 m) to the mile. At the international boundary, it is a rapid winding stream averaging about 20 feet (6.1 m) in width and interrupted at frequent intervals by steep bars covered with only a few inches of water. The upper portion of the river from the boundary to California creek can hardly be considered a navigable stream even for small boats. Below California creek, the volume of water increases and the descent becomes less difficult, but bars and rapids continue almost to the mouth and no part of the river is easy to ascend. The tributary streams are small, as a rule, but two large streams, one draining the country to the west and one other to the south, come in within four miles of each other, nearly opposite Indian River, and these branches nearly double the volume of the main river. Towards its mouth, Sixtymile has an average width of from 120–150 feet (37–46 m). Below Sixtymile, the Yukon contains many islands.

The valley of Sixtymile is generally flat-bottomed, the flats varying from a 600 feet (180 m) to nearly 1 mile (1.6 km) in width. The sides are usually terraced and in places, the stream for long distances, has cut a secondary rock-walled channel, similar to that noticed on Indian river and Stewart River, through the bottom of its old valley. The country bordering Sixtymile River forms part of the Yukon plateau, a highland worn into rounded hills and long zigzag ridges, but containing no well-defined and continuous mountain ranges. At several points, high hills usually of andesite, project a few hundred feet above the general level.

Miller Creek enters Sixtymile about 70 miles (110 km) from its mouth. In addition to Miller Creek, Glacier, Gold, Little Gold, and Bed Rock creeks are all tributaries of Sixtymile. Sixtymile Butte, a prominent mountain above the headwaters of the stream, is of granite.

== Geology ==
At the boundary and down the valley to Bedrock creek, the rocks consist principally of igneous schists of various kinds, largely granite-gneisses, with which are associated some quartzites and other clastic schists. These schists constitute the gold-bearing rocks. They are replaced below Bedrock creek by andesites which continue down to a point 1.5 miles (2.4 km) west of the mouth of Gold creek. The andesites extend up Miller Creek nearly 3 miles (4.8 km) and up Gold creek over 7 miles (11 km).

== History ==
Sixtymile and Fortymile, both named for the distance from Fort Reliance, Yukon, were part of the Yukon district during the Klondike Gold Rush, with at least 1,000 men working the two streams in 1895. At the mouth of Sixtymile a townsite of that name was located and served as the headquarters for upwards of 100 miners. Messrs. Arthur Harper & Co. had a trading post and a sawmill on an island at the mouth of the stream, both of which were run by Joseph Ladue, one of the partners of the firm, and who was at one time in the employ of the Alaska Commercial Company.

== See also ==
- List of rivers of Alaska
- List of rivers of Yukon
