= Jack McQuesten =

American pioneer, trader, and prospector (1836–1909)

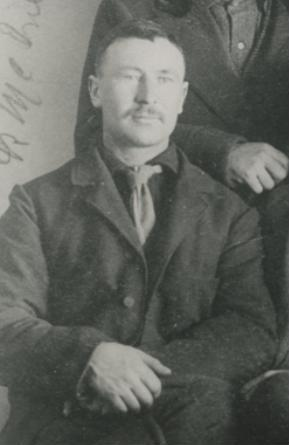
- Leroy Napoleon "Jack" McQuesten
- Born: Leroy Napoleon "Jack" McQuesten; 1836; Litchfield, New Hampshire
- Died: 1909 (aged 72–73); California
- Occupations: Explorer, trader, and prospector

Leroy Napoleon "Jack" McQuesten (1836–1909) was an American pioneer, explorer, trader, and prospector in Alaska and Yukon; he became known as the "Father of the Yukon." Other nicknames included "Yukon Jack," "Captain Jack," "Golden Rule McQuesten," and "Father of Alaska." Together with partners Arthur Harper and Captain Alfred Mayo, he founded Fort Reliance and a wide network of trading posts in the Yukon, often providing a grubstake to prospectors. He was the most successful financially of the trio, becoming a multi-millionaire by 1898 and buying a large Victorian mansion for his family when they moved about that time to Berkeley, California.

He was the first president of the Alaskan Order of Yukon Pioneers and also belonged to the Yukon Order of Pioneers. He wrote a memoir, Recollections of Leroy N. McQuesten, Life in the Yukon 1871-1885, which was published posthumously in 1952.

== Biography ==
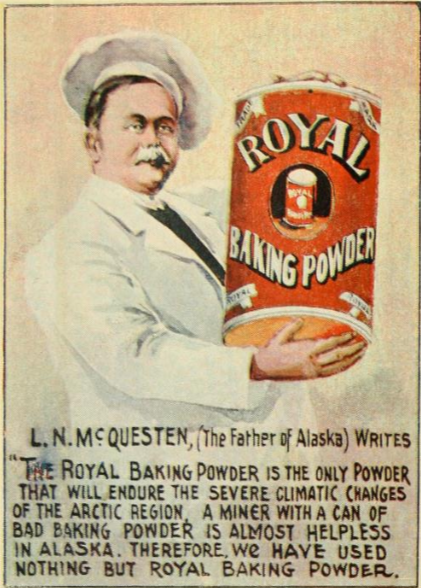
Jack McQuesten endorses the Royal Baking Powder Company in an 1898 advertisement.

Leroy Napoleon McQuesten (called "Jack") was born in 1836 in Litchfield, New Hampshire to a family of Scots-Irish descent. His family moved to Illinois in the 19th-century westward migration, and then to California by the time he was 13. He was there for the gold rush.

McQuesten joined other adventurers in the Yukon, becoming partners with traders Arthur Harper, an immigrant from northern Ireland, and Alfred Mayo, of Irish descent from Bangor, Maine. Together the three founded the trading post of Fort Reliance in the Yukon. Later, Dawson City developed six miles upriver of their post. Their post was such a point of reference, that prospectors both up and downriver named creeks and rivers in reference to their distance from Fort Reliance, as in Sixtymile River and Fortymile River.

McQuesten and his two partners each married native Athabascan women of the Koyukon people, strengthening their ties among the local culture. In 1874 Harper married a young woman he called Jeannine, who had not gone to a mission school and preferred to teach her children traditional ways.

The three trading partners moved to Tanana after 1875, where they set up another trading post near the Athabascan village of Nuklukayet. In 1878 McQuesten married Satejdenalno (1860–1921). She was from Kokrines village, about 80 miles west. She had attended the Russian mission school, as had her cousin Margaret, whom Mayo married. Satejdenalno became known as Katherine (or Kate) James McQuesten. Fluent in Koyukon, Russian, and English, she often acted as an intermediary for her husband and his partners in communications with the local natives. She was an important player in their business affairs, and they also had several children together.

In 1879, McQuesten was hired by the Alaska Commercial Company to manage their trading post. McQuesten had helped found the Alaskan Order of Yukon Pioneers, and was its first elected president. He also belonged to the Yukon Order of Pioneers, as did Mayo. Their motto was the Golden Rule: "Do unto others as you would have others do unto you".

In 1894, McQuesten founded Circle City, Alaska, which developed the largest log cabin district in the North Country. He and Kate set up the Alaska Commercial Company in town. With the frenzy of the Klondike gold rush in 1897, he feared food shortages in Circle City and decided to leave Alaska. He bought some mining claims on Eldorado and Bonanza creeks in the Klondike district as late as 1898, and made a profit. The most successful financially of the trading partners with his various ventures, by 1898 he had become a multi-millionaire.

McQuesten resettled with his family in Berkeley, California, where they purchased a large Victorian mansion for their big family. The youngest several children all attended school there, graduating from Berkeley High School.

He wrote a memoir, Recollections of Leroy N. McQuesten, Life in the Yukon 1871-1885 (1952), which was published posthumously from his original manuscript held by the Yukon Order of Pioneers. It was reprinted in 1977 by Star Printing of Whitehorse, Yukon.

== Legacy ==
- A tributary of the Yukon River is named McQuesten River in his honor.
- A mountain range is named after him.
- An airstrip near Moose Creek on the Klondike Highway is named after him.
- The area is the location of the so-called McQuesten Mineral Belt.
- "Yukon Jack", the 100-proof Canadian whiskey and honey-based liquor, was named after McQuesten.
- He was selected for the Alaska Mining Hall of Fame.
