= The Kink =

- U.S. National Register of Historic Places
- Alaska Heritage Resources Survey
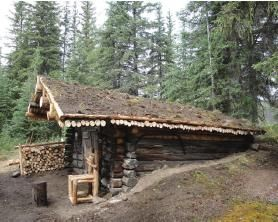
- A miner's cabin at The Kink

- Location within Alaska
- Location: Along the North Fork Fortymile River, about 21.5 miles (34.6 km) north of Chicken
- Nearest city: Chicken, Alaska
- Coordinates: 64°23′08″N 142°01′38″W
- Area: 280 acres (110 ha)
- Built: 1904
- NRHP reference No.: 75002161
- AHRS No.: EAG-064
- Added to NRHP: November 20, 1975

The Kink is a manmade feature of the North Fork Fortymile River in remote eastern Alaska. It is a channel that was blasted through a rock ridge by gold miners in 1904, in the belief that bypassing a horseshoe-shaped meander in the river's natural flow would reveal gold deposits. The effort was unsuccessful.

The area includes the remnants of a small mining camp. The creation of the channel was a major engineering feat of the time, given the remote location and harsh climate (conditions that continue to apply today).

The Kink was listed on the National Register of Historic Places in 1975.

== See also ==
- National Register of Historic Places listings in Southeast Fairbanks Census Area, Alaska
