= Jules Louis Prevost =

American missionary and translator (1863–1937)

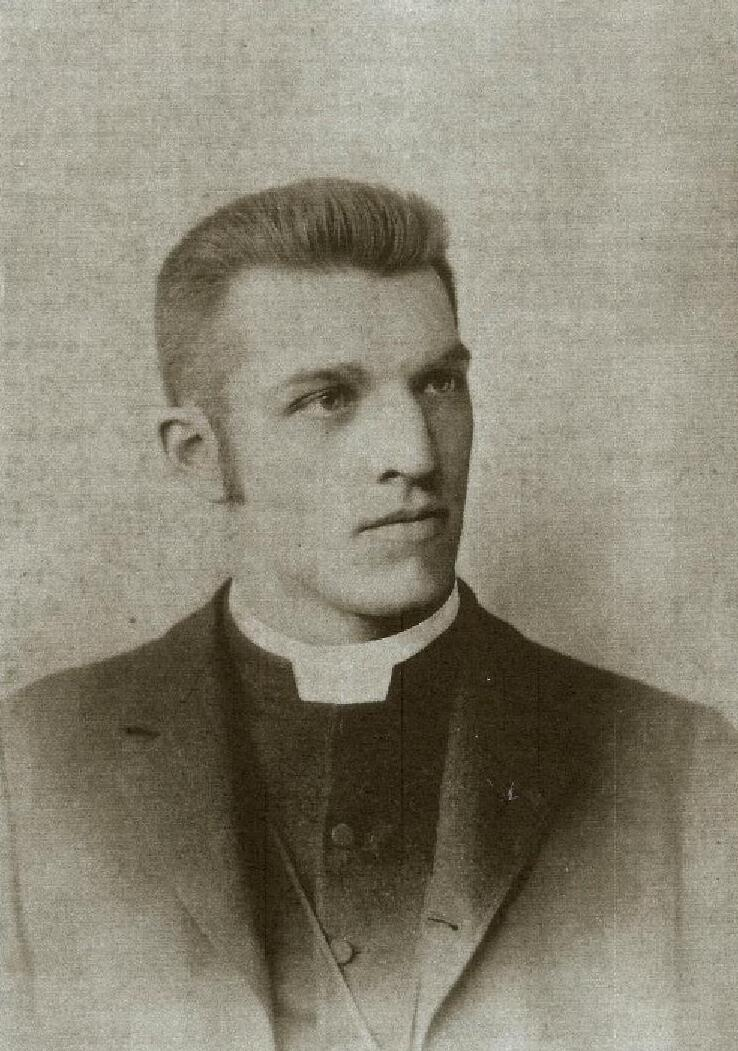
- Born: June 20, 1863; Brooklyn, New York
- Died: September 2, 1937 (aged 74); Pughtown, Pennsylvania
- Occupations: Missionary, translator

Jules Louis Prevost (June 20, 1863 – September 2, 1937) was an American Episcopal missionary to Alaska, a linguist and translator, and a professor of the history of medicine at the Temple University School of Medicine.

== Early life and education ==
Prevost was born on June 20, 1863 in Brooklyn, New York. His mother died at an early age, and he spent a few years in an orphanage.

Prevost studied at the Philadelphia Divinity School, receiving his B.D. degree in 1890. He was ordained to the diaconate by Bishop Ozi W. Whitaker. Prevost studied Arabic for two years in anticipation of traveling to Algeria to proselytize, but became interested in Alaska after meeting William Duncan.

== Alaskan missionary ==
After ordination to the priesthood in 1891, Prevost traveled to Fort Adams on the Yukon River in Alaska, arriving in August 1891.

Prevost published the first newspaper of Interior Alaska, the Yukon Press, with Gordon Bettles in 1894. On furlough to the United States in 1894, he married Anna Louise Demonet and studied at the New York School of Pharmacy. They returned to Tanana. He translated portions of the Book of Common Prayer into the Upper Koyukon language, along with hymns and other texts.

Beginning in 1898, Prevost served as US postmaster at Tanana under John Clum. By 1900, Prevost moved to Nome, before leaving for Brooklyn by way of Seattle, Washington to fundraise for the Alaskan missions. He returned to Tanana in 1901.

== Educational career ==
In 1906 he left Alaska permanently, returning with his family to Philadelphia. He served as rector of St. Ambrose's Church. He also earned a degree in medicine from Temple University School of Medicine, graduating in 1909.

He continued as a lecturer in medical history at Temple University until 1929. That year he accepted a call to St. Andrew's Church, Panama City, Florida. He returned to Pennsylvania in 1933.

== Personal life and death ==
Prevost married Anna Louise Demonet at St. John's Church (Episcopal), Brooklyn, Kings, New York on 18 December 1894. The couple had four children.

Prevost died of heart disease at his home in Pughtown, Pennsylvania on September 2, 1937.

== "Magic lantern" ==
During his stops at various locations, it is likely that Prevost gave presentations using his "magic lantern", a type of early image projector. He used this projector to show images of Alaska during his lectures for fundraising and providing status to the church.

Slides from Prevost's collection
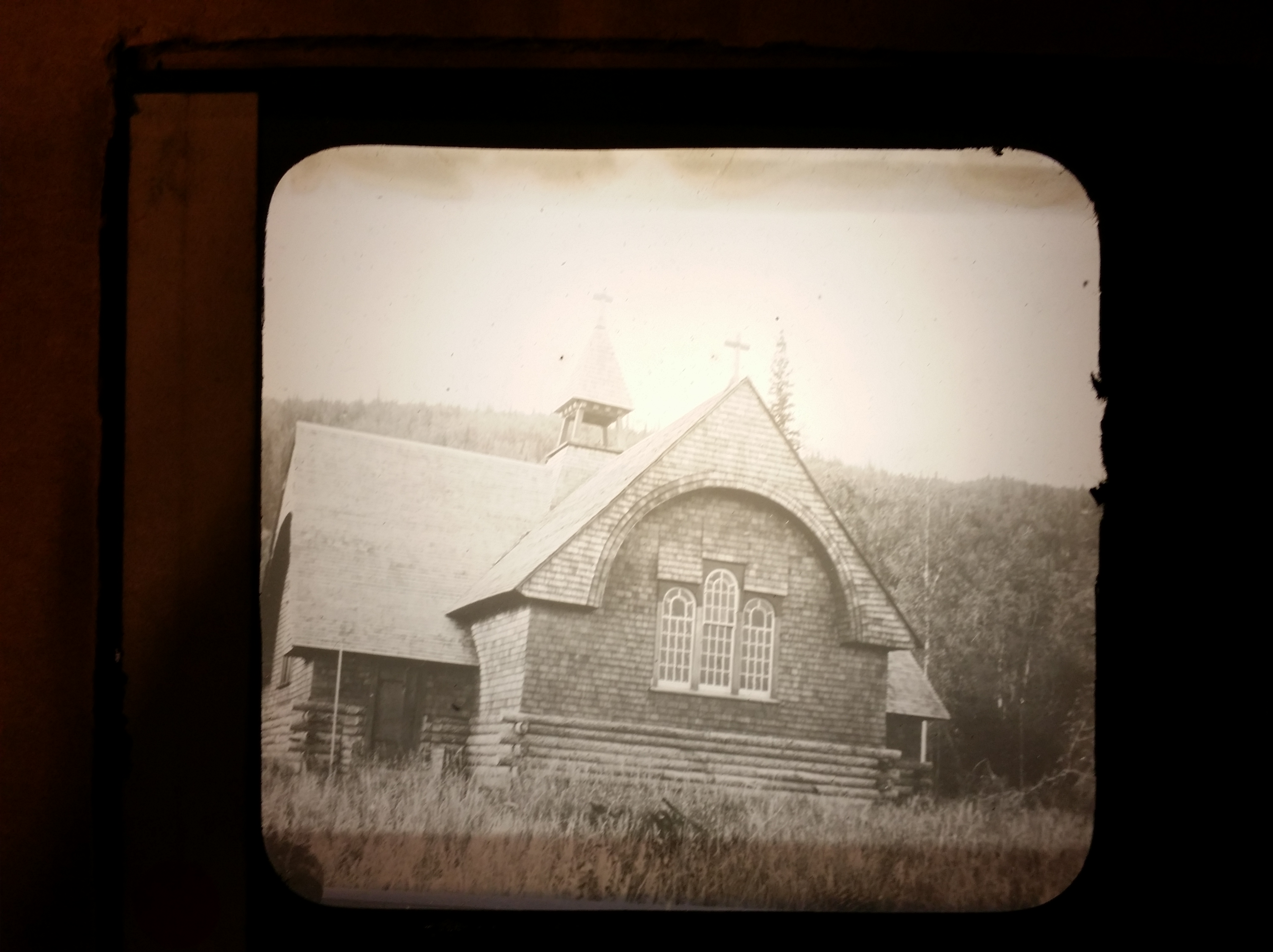

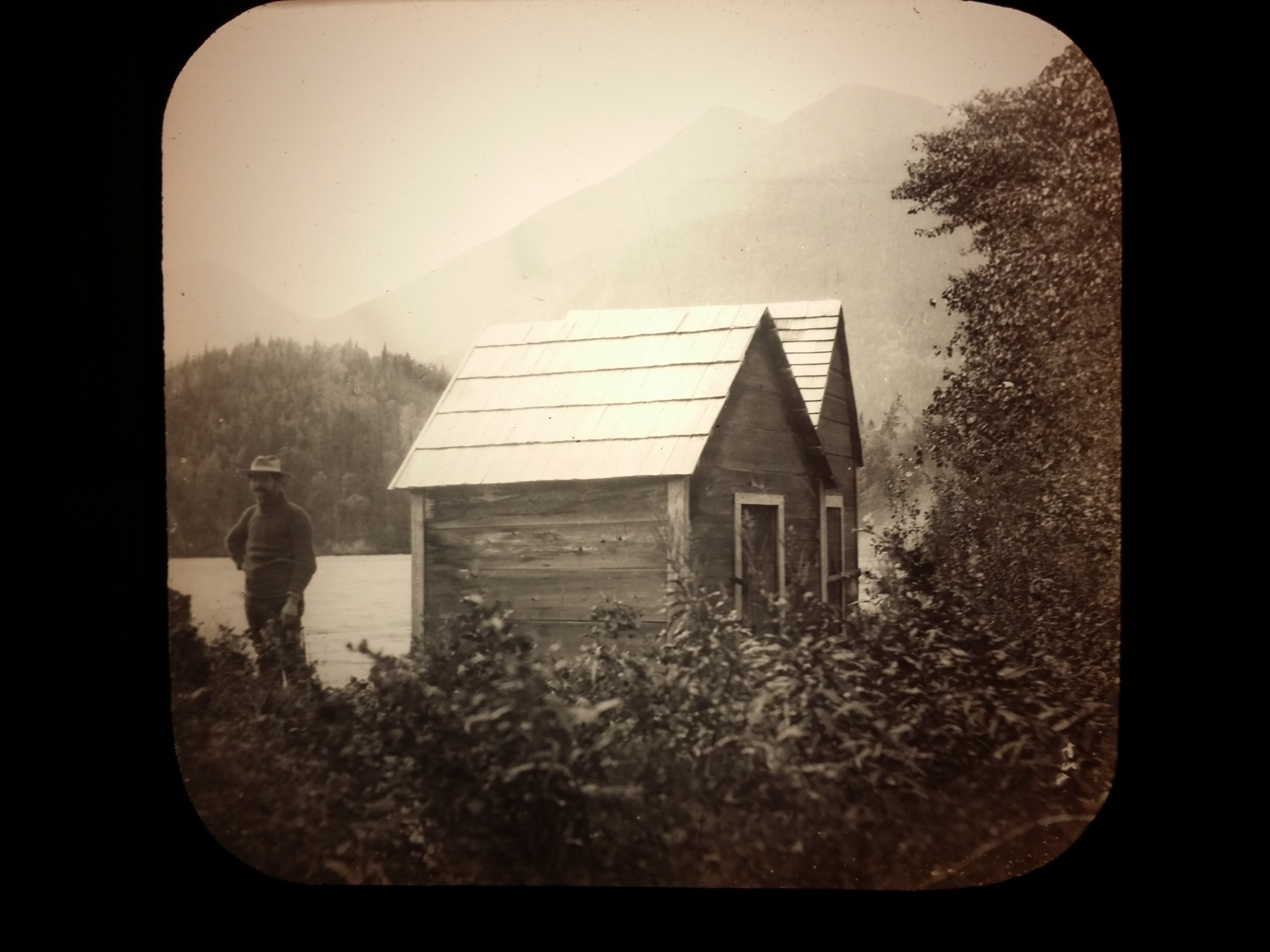

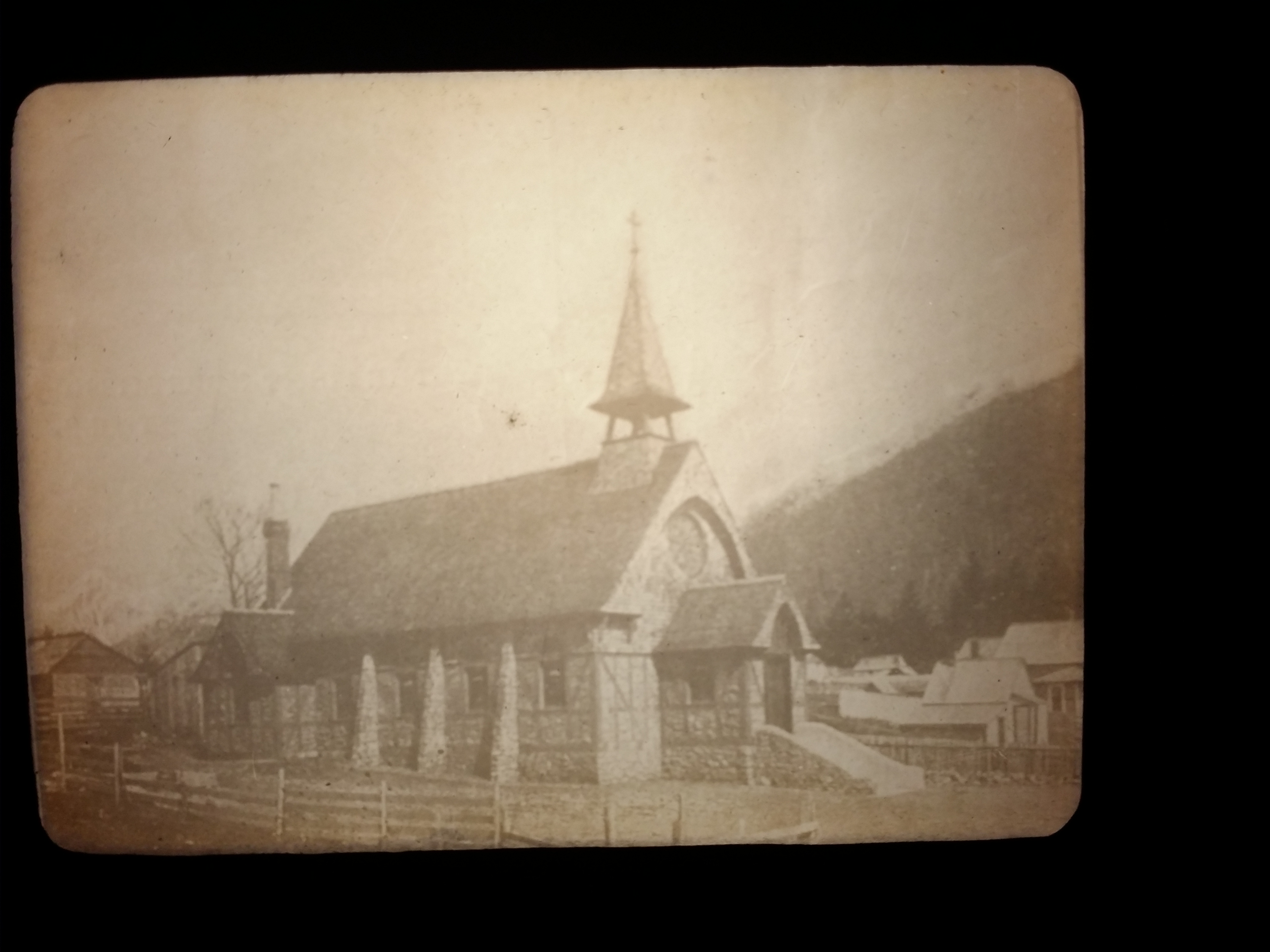
