= Forty Mile, Yukon =

Town in Yukon, Canada

Coordinates: 64°27′N 140°33′W

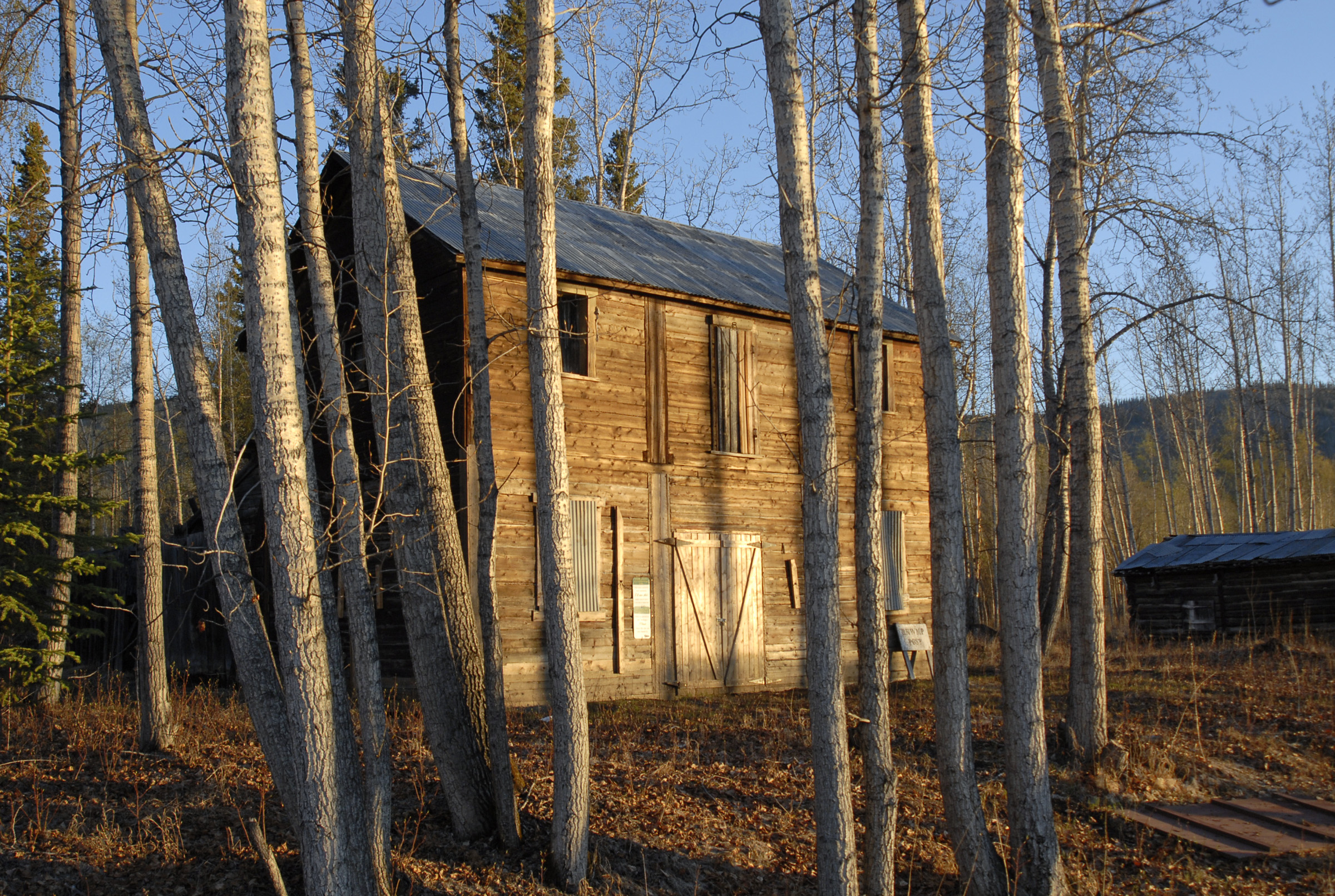
The Royal North-West Mounted Police building at Forty Mile.

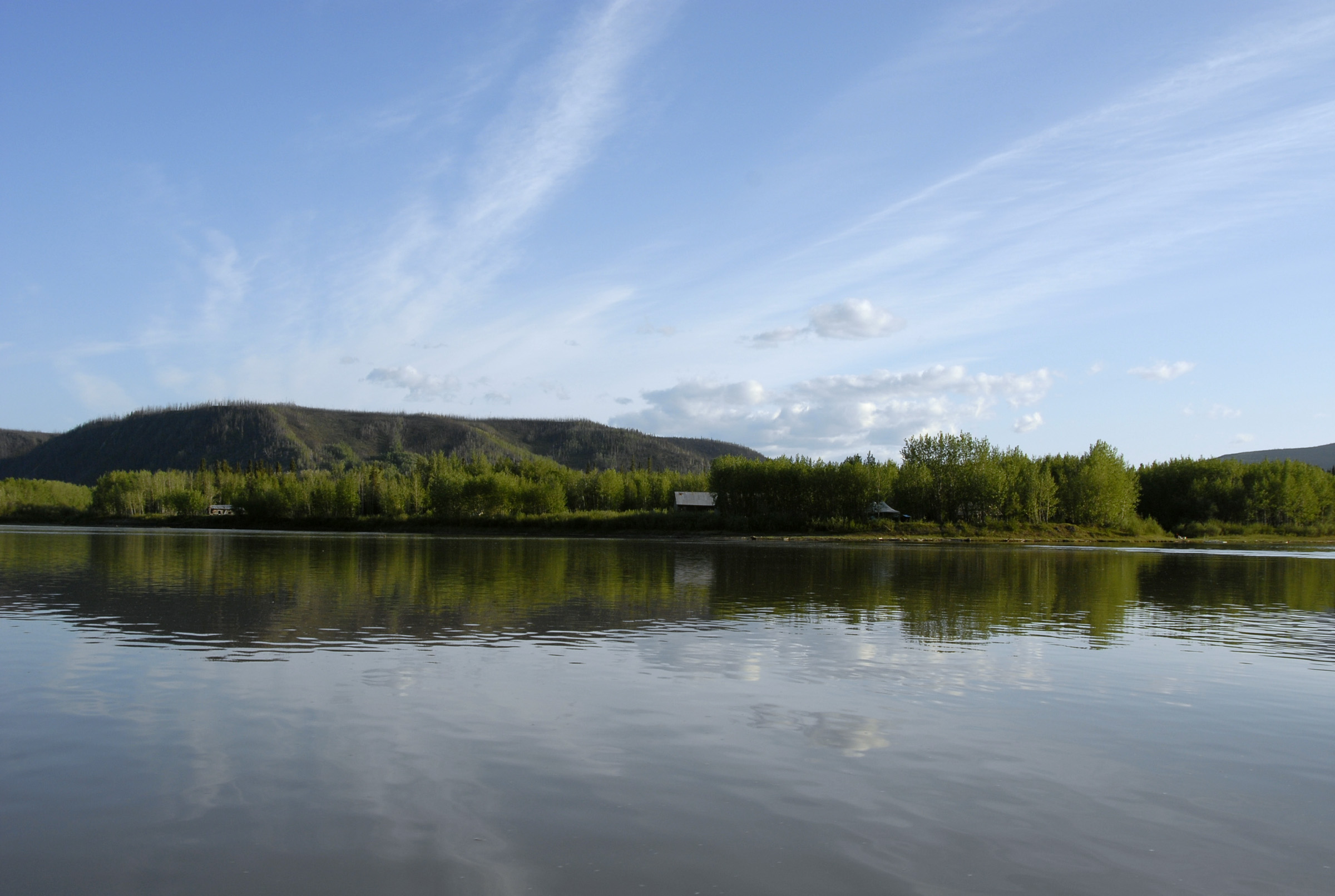
A view of Forty Mile historic site from the Yukon River.

Forty Mile (Hän: Ch’ëdähdëk) is best known as the oldest town in Canada's Yukon. It was established in 1886 at the confluence of the Yukon and Fortymile rivers by prospectors and fortune hunters in search of gold. Largely abandoned during the nearby Klondike Gold Rush, the town site continued to be used by Tr’ondëk Hwëch’in. It is currently a historic site that is co-owned and co-managed by Tr'ondëk Hwëch'in and the Government of Yukon. Ch’ëdähdëk (Forty Mile) became part of the Tr’ondëk-Klondike UNESCO World Heritage Site in 2023, recording of the transformation of the landscape and the Indigenous adaptation to European colonization.

The site has a much longer history, however, as a harvest area used by First Nations for more than 2000 years. This location was one of the major fall river-crossing points of the Fortymile caribou herd. Hunters would intercept the herd here as it crossed the Yukon River. In spring and summer, it was the site of an important Arctic grayling and salmon fishery. Although this was not the location of the first encounter between local First Nations people and non-natives, it is the place where Hän-speaking people had their first extended interactions with European culture.

In 1886 Jack McQuesten, Alfred Mayo and Arthur Harper of the Alaska Commercial Company (ACCo) established a post here, after gold was discovered on the Fortymile River. Most of the miners who staked the original claims in the Klondike came from this area. Yukon's first mission school was established here in 1887 by the Anglican Church. That same year, North-West Mounted Police Inspector Charles Constantine established the territory's first police detachment. It is also likely that the Forty Mile farm was the site of the first agriculture in Yukon. Forty Mile was the place where the Discovery Claim was registered, beginning the Klondike Gold Rush. By 1894, Forty Mile boasted two well-equipped stores (ACCo and the North American Transportation and Trading Company), a lending library, billiard room, 10 saloons, two restaurants, a theatre, an opera house, a watchmaker, and numerous distilleries. At its peak the town site's population was about 600. However, after the Klondike Gold Rush ended, the city declined, and today only a handful of buildings remain.

The Tr’ondëk Hwëch’in Final Agreement, ratified by the First Nation's membership in 1998, specified that the Forty Mile, Fort Constantine and Fort Cudahy Historic Site was to be co-owned and co-managed by the Tr’ondëk Hwëch’in and Yukon governments. Since 1998, archaeological investigations, archival and oral history research, and building stabilization and preservation have been carried out at the site. On June 11, 2006, the two governments signed a management plan at a ceremony and celebration hosted at Forty Mile by Tr’ondëk Hwëch’in and Yukon Historic Sites Unit.

Future plans for Forty Mile include improved visitor facilities, a major expansion of interpretive programming, and continued preservation work.

The nearest community is Dawson City, approximately 77 km (48 mi) upriver from the town site. Since the construction of a road to Clinton Creek from the Top of the World Highway in the late 1960s, the site has been accessible by road, and is about 97 km (60 mi) from Dawson. To this day most visitors to Forty Mile arrive by water, either traveling downriver from Dawson City or motoring up the Yukon River from Alaska.

== See also ==
- List of communities in Yukon
- North-West Mounted Police in the Canadian north
