= Mount Harper =

Mountain in Yukon, Canada

Highest point
- Elevation: 1,845 m (6,053 ft)
- Prominence: 580 m (1,900 ft)
- Coordinates: 64°40′30.0″N 139°52′19.2″W

Geography
- Location: Yukon, Canada
- Parent range: Ogilvie Mountains
- Topo map: NTS 116B12 Mount Harper

Geology
- Rock age: Late Proterozoic

Mount Harper is a deeply eroded Late Proterozoic volcanic complex located 71 km (44 mi) north of Dawson City and 33 km (21 mi) west of Mount Gibben. Mount Harper is in the Ogilvie Mountains and is the 1,200 m (3,900 ft) thick remnant of a subaqueous-to-emergent basaltic shield volcano capped by small rhyodacitic and andesitic lava flows. It oversteps the Harper Fault.

In 1888, William Olgilvie named the mountain in honor of Arthur Harper, recognized as the first man to enter the Yukon country seeking gold.

== See also ==
- List of volcanoes in Canada
- Volcanism in Canada
