= Klondike, Yukon =

Region of Yukon, Canada

Coordinates: 64°3′45″N 139°25′50″W

UNESCO World Heritage Site
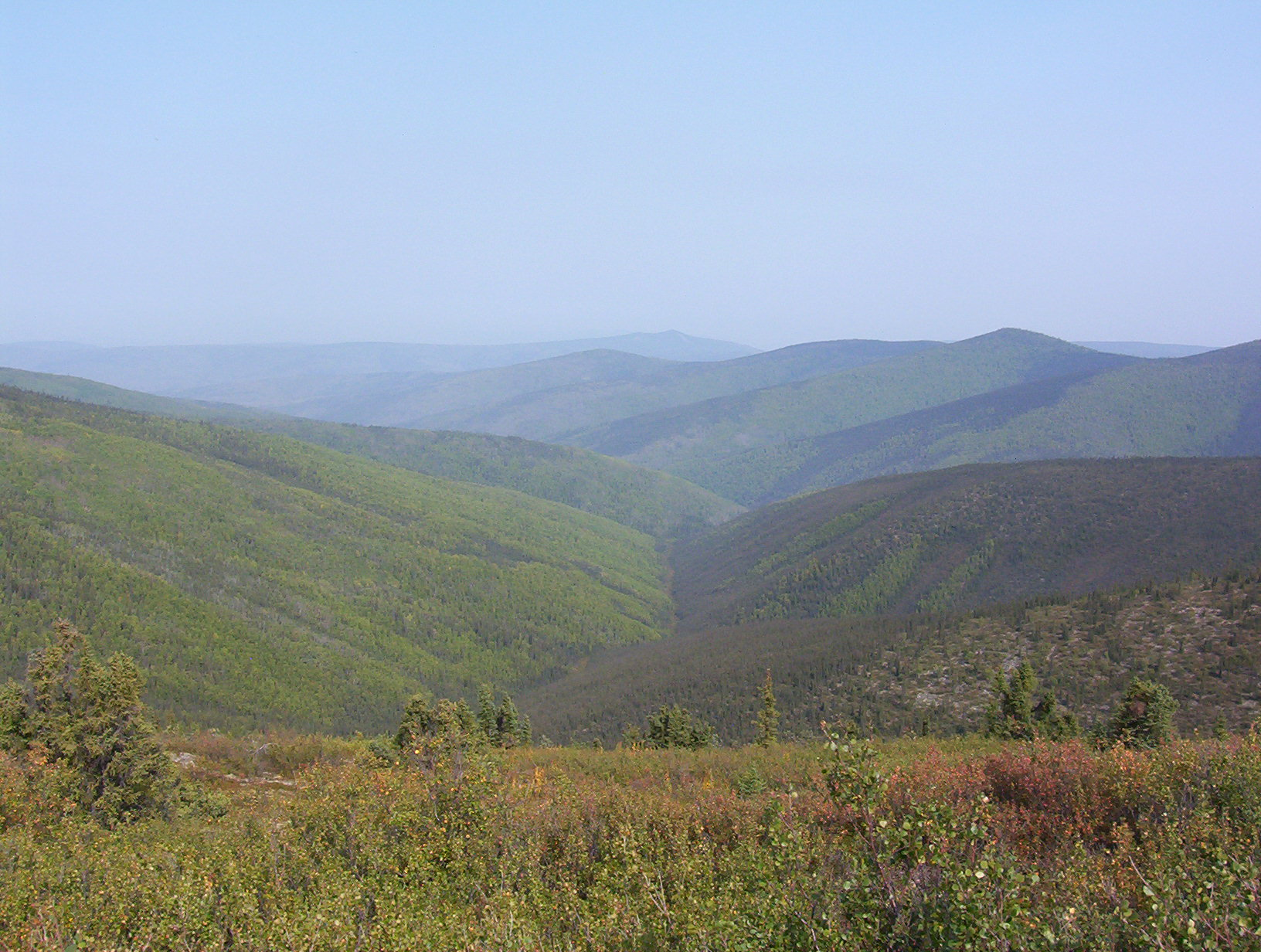
- Hunker Creek Valley, Klondike
- Interactive map of Klondike, Yukon
- Official name: Tr'ondëk-Klondike
- Criteria: Cultural: iv
- Reference: 1564
- Inscription: 2023 (45th Session)
- Area: 334.54 ha (826.7 acres)
- Buffer zone: 351.7 ha (869 acres)

The Klondike (/ˈklɒndaɪk/; from Hän Tr'ondëk 'hammerstone water') is a region of the territory of Yukon, in northwestern Canada. It lies around the Klondike River, a small river that enters the Yukon River from the east at Dawson City. The area is merely an informal geographic region, and has no function to the territory as any kind of administrative region.

The Klondike is famed due to the Klondike Gold Rush, which started in 1896 and lasted until 1899. Since then, gold has been mined continuously in that area, except for a pause in the late 1960s and early 1970s.

In 2023, the cultural landscape of the Tr'ondëk-Klondike was inscribed as a UNESCO World Heritage Site, because of its testimony to the adaptation of the Tr'ondëk Hwëch'in people to the European colonization that began in the late 19th century.

== Climate and ecology ==
Klondike has a subarctic climate (Köppen Dfc), bordering on a tundra climate (Köppen ET). The climate is warm in the short summer, and very cold during the long winter. By late October, ice forms over the rivers. For the majority of the year, the ground is frozen to a depth of 1 to 3 metres (3 to 10 ft). The landscape is dominated by spruce, aspen, and birch trees interspersed with riparian vegetation.

Salmon have likely been migrating from the Pacific Ocean to the Klondike River to spawn for at least 65,000 years, and archeological evidence suggests that they have been fished as early as 11,500 years ago. Caribou also migrate through the Klondike region during their seasonal migrations. Other species found in the region include moose, black bear, grizzly bear, lynx, marten, wolf, wolverine, Dall's sheep, and beaver.

There is a weather station for Klondike located along the Dempster Highway, near the southern entrance of Tombstone Territorial Park, at an elevation of 973 m (3192 ft).

Climate data for Klondike, Yukon, 1981-2006 normals, 1966-2010 extremes: 3192ft (973m)
Month	Jan	Feb	Mar	Apr	May	Jun	Jul	Aug	Sep	Oct	Nov	Dec	Year
Record high °C (°F)	7 (44)	8 (46)	6 (42)	15 (59)	30 (86)	30 (86)	28 (82)	28 (82)	26 (78)	18 (65)	10 (50)	7 (44)	30 (86)
Mean maximum °C (°F)	−1.7 (29.0)	0.3 (32.5)	2.5 (36.5)	9.6 (49.3)	18.6 (65.5)	24.0 (75.2)	24.6 (76.2)	22.2 (72.0)	15.2 (59.3)	7.1 (44.8)	−0.6 (31.0)	0.0 (32.0)	25.8 (78.5)
Mean daily maximum °C (°F)	−14.9 (5.2)	−11.2 (11.9)	−6.8 (19.8)	1.5 (34.7)	10.0 (50.0)	17.2 (63.0)	18.5 (65.3)	15.1 (59.2)	7.9 (46.2)	−1.9 (28.5)	−11.2 (11.8)	−11.8 (10.7)	1.0 (33.9)
Daily mean °C (°F)	−21.1 (−6.0)	−18.0 (−0.4)	−14.4 (6.1)	−5.8 (21.6)	3.5 (38.3)	9.8 (49.7)	11.4 (52.6)	8.2 (46.8)	2.1 (35.7)	−7.1 (19.3)	−16.7 (1.9)	−18.0 (−0.4)	−5.5 (22.1)
Mean daily minimum °C (°F)	−26.9 (−16.4)	−24.7 (−12.5)	−21.8 (−7.2)	−12.9 (8.8)	−2.7 (27.1)	2.7 (36.8)	4.5 (40.1)	1.6 (34.8)	−3.6 (25.6)	−11.9 (10.6)	−22.0 (−7.6)	−23.9 (−11.0)	−11.8 (10.8)
Mean minimum °C (°F)	−40.4 (−40.7)	−37.9 (−36.3)	−34.9 (−30.9)	−24.4 (−12.0)	−10.1 (13.9)	−2.7 (27.1)	−0.6 (30.9)	−3.8 (25.2)	−11.4 (11.4)	−25.0 (−13.0)	−34.4 (−30.0)	−37.6 (−35.7)	−43.5 (−46.3)
Record low °C (°F)	−52 (−61)	−48 (−55)	−42 (−44)	−35 (−31)	−23 (−9)	−7 (19)	−3 (26)	−9 (16)	−25 (−13)	−35 (−31)	−45 (−49)	−46 (−50)	−52 (−61)
Average precipitation mm (inches)	24 (0.96)	22 (0.86)	29 (1.16)	18 (0.71)	21 (0.84)	46 (1.80)	75 (2.94)	67 (2.64)	49 (1.94)	39 (1.53)	29 (1.15)	45 (1.78)	464 (18.31)
Average snowfall cm (inches)	24 (9.6)	22 (8.6)	29 (11.6)	18 (6.9)	4.1 (1.6)	0.25 (0.1)	trace	0.51 (0.2)	8.4 (3.3)	32 (12.7)	28 (11.2)	45 (17.8)	211.26 (83.6)
Source: XMACIS2 (normals, extremes & 1991-2006 precip/snow)

== Politics ==
Klondike is a district of the Legislative Assembly of Yukon. The former Premier of the Yukon, Liberal Sandy Silver, represented the electoral district of Klondike.

== History ==
The Tr'ondëk Hwëch'in people have continuously occupied the Klondike region for over 9000 years, and UNESCO has stated this was "fundamentally transformed during the colonial occupation of these lands." European traders began to arrive in the region in the mid 19th century, and in 1874, the first trading post in the Klondike (Fort Reliance) was established. Soon after, in 1876, the Indian Act was passed (without Indigenous negotiation), which restricted the ability of Indigenous Canadians to continue their cultural practices and live in their original lands. This act and the discovery of precious metals in the area led to a steady increase in the arrival of colonists during the 1880s, and in 1893, the first permanent non-Indigenous settlement was founded at Ch'ëdähdëk (Forty Mile), at the site of an ancient indigenous hunting spot. When gold was discovered nearby in 1896, several boomtowns were founded and the landscape around the Klondike transformed into an industrial hub. Nearly 30,000 people arrived in Dawson City over the next few years. In mid-1901 an expedition left California hoping to prove that the Klondike was the site of the Biblical Garden of Eden. It was sponsored ($50,000) by Morris Ketchum Jesup with an American naturalist (Norman Buxton) and two Russian scientists (Waldemar Bogoras and Waldemar Jochelson). The Tr'ondëk Hwëch'in were forced to relocate downriver to an ancestral camp called Moosehide, where it became the center of the Indigenous community until the 1950s.

After the Klondike Gold Rush ended near the turn of the 20th century, many of the boomtowns quickly became ghost towns, but Dawson City remained the capital of the Yukon until 1953 (when the capital was moved to Whitehorse).

== Tr'ondëk-Klondike World Heritage Site ==
Several archaeological sites in the Klondike were inscribed on the UNESCO World Heritage List in 2023 as a cultural landscape, described as follows:

Located along the Yukon River in the sub-arctic region of Northwest Canada, Tr'ondëk-Klondike lies within the homeland of the Tr'ondëk Hwëch'in First Nation. It contains archaeological and historic sources that reflect Indigenous people's adaptation to unprecedented changes caused by the Klondike Gold Rush at the end of the 19th century. The series illustrates different aspects of the colonization of this area, including sites of exchange between the Indigenous population and the colonists, and sites demonstrating the Tr'ondëk Hwëch'in's adaptations to colonial presence.

The site contains eight subsites:

These sites show archaeological evidence of the transition from Indigenous to European land use, and the interactions between the two cultures. In total, the World Heritage Site includes 8 distinct properties.

- Fort Reliance: the first trading post in the Klondike, built in 1874.
- Ch'ëdähdëk (Forty Mile): A traditional hunting location and the oldest European settlement in the Yukon, which was abandoned during the nearby Klondike Gold Rush.
- Ch'ëdähdëk Tth'än K'et (Dënezhu Graveyard): A First Nations cemetery with approximately 22 graves.
- Fort Cudahy and Fort Constantine: Forts established in 1893 and 1895 and abandoned shortly thereafter.
- Tr'ochëk: A traditional fishing camp
- Dawson City: The major city and industrial hub of the Yukon during the Klondike Gold Rush.
- Jëjik Dhä Dënezhu Kek'it (Moosehide Village): An important gathering place for the Tr'ondëk Hwëch'in First Nation and where they relocated during the European expansion.
- The Zra¸y Kek'it (Black City): an archeological site and abandoned indigenous settlement used in the 19th century to take advantage of trade with the influx of European colonists.
