= Fort Reliance =

Former trading post in Yukon, Canada

- Trading post
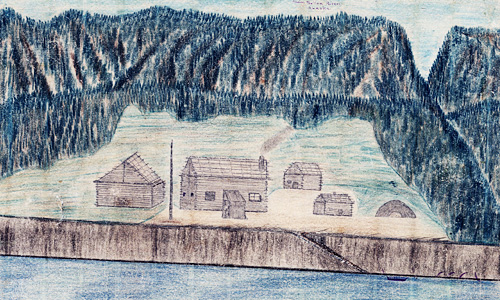
- Illustration of Fort Reliance 1884 by Willis Everette

- Fort Reliance in Yukon
- Coordinates: 64°08′28″N 139°29′06″W
- Country: Canada
- Territory: Yukon
- Built: 1874, reopened 1879
- Closed: 1877 (first time), around 1869
- Founder: Alaska Commercial Company

Fort Reliance is an abandoned trading post in the territory of Yukon, Canada. It stands on the east bank of the Yukon River, 13 km (8.1 mi) downstream of the town of Dawson City. The fort was established in 1874 by François Mercier, Jack McQuesten, and Francis Barnfield for the Alaska Commercial Company to serve as a trading post.

Trading at Fort Reliance continued uninterrupted until 1877. During this time, the post became a major landmark for traders. The Fortymile River, Sixtymile River, and Seventymile River were named for their distance from the fort. In 1877, traders abandoned the fort after natives stole their goods. Traders returned in 1879 and operated the fort until 1886, when it was abandoned due to a gold strike on the Stewart River. The gold strike diverted traders' attention from fur trapping, and thus the fort assumed less importance.

The site of Fort Reliance is one of eight locations which comprise Tr’ondëk-Klondike World Heritage Site, inscribed by UNESCO on September 17, 2023. These locations show the transformation of the landscape from Indigenous to colonial use and the adaptations of the Indigenous peoples to the European settlers.

== History ==
Fort Reliance was originally established as a fur trading post to accommodate trade with the Indigenous Hän people. The site of the fort was chosen by François Mercier and it was constructed by Jack McQuesten and Francis Barnfield with the help of the Hän. After the construction of the fort, McQuesten and Barnfield began trading with the local peoples. They were able to trade all of their goods for valuable furs. The first year proved the profitability of the fort. Fort Reliance would become a major trading hub in the region until it was abandoned by the traders in 1877 due to the theft of their goods by some of the Hän.

Jack McQuesten returned to the fort in 1879 in order to avoid the competition with other trading post down river. He was discouraged from going back to Fort Reliance by a chief of a neighbouring tribe because, after the fort had been abandoned, some of the native women were killed by rat poison mixed with animal fat that was left behind by the traders. The chief feared for McQuesten's safety if he were to return to the fort. McQuesten decided to continue on to Fort Reliance and found that he was actually welcomed by the Hän upon his return. They even compensated him for the previously stolen goods and they did not blame the traders for the death of the women. The fort continued to be operated as a fur trading post, but eventually became a supply stop for gold prospectors on the Yukon. When gold was found on the Stewart River, a tributary of the Yukon river downstream from Fort Reliance, trade was diverted away from the fort and it was abandoned.

== Buildings ==
Fort Reliance consisted of several buildings of various types of construction. All that remains of these buildings are ground features such as pits or post holes. After it was abandoned, many of its buildings were used as fuel by the steamboats that sailed the Yukon River. The main buildings consisted of three or four log cabins built for the traders. The largest of these cabins was described by François Mercier to be roughly 7.6 m (25 ft) long by 9.1 m (30 ft) wide. The remains of five pit houses are found at the site. These pits were roughly 4.5 to 5 m^{2} (48 to 54 sq ft) square and four of the five had dug out entryways leading into them that were between 2.5 and 5 m (8 ft 2 in and 16 ft 5 in) long. The pit houses were likely inhabited by the Hän that traded at the site.

== Native Hän occupation ==
The site of Fort Reliance contains signs of occupation by the Hän before the establishment of the fort and during its operation as a trading post. The remains of a Hän fishing village, Nuclaco, exists on a small island near the west bank of the Yukon River, just across from the fort. The site was occupied seasonally during the Chinook or king and chum salmon runs in the summer.

== Demographics ==
Historical population
Census	Pop.	Note	%±
1880	83		—

Fort Reliance was erroneously reported on the 1880 United States census as being located within Alaska (Yukon Division), despite being some 80 km (50 mi) due east of the international boundary. It featured eighty-three residents, of which one was white and eighty-two were of the Tinneh tribe.
