= Arthur Harper (trader) =

Irish prospector

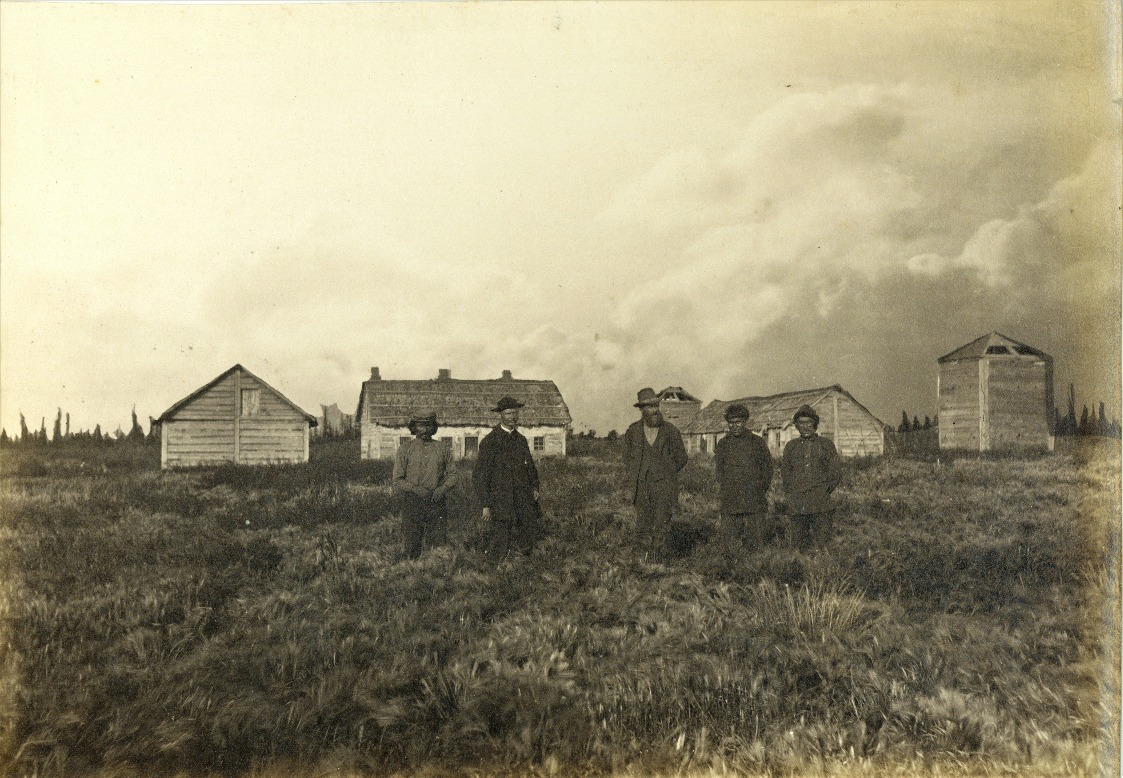
Arthur Harper (center) photographed with missionary Vincent C. Sim and three Alaska Native men at the abandoned Fort Yukon trading post (c. 1884)

Arthur Harper (1835–1897) was an Irish-born Yukon River prospector, trader, and explorer, recognized as the first man to enter the Yukon country seeking gold. He mined in California during the 1850s, and British Columbia during the 1860s, before travelling to the Yukon region in 1871. He reached Fort Yukon in 1873, and managed a store with Jack McQuesten at the Fortymile River. Harper formed a trading partnership with McQuesten and Captain Al Mayo; their company founded Fort Reliance in 1875 and other posts in the Yukon region. Harper was known as the best prospector of the trio, and while he did not achieve major success in his pursuit of gold, he sometimes directed others to finds. He traded and prospected in Alaska until just before his death.

== Early years ==
Arthur Harper was born in County Antrim, present-day Northern Ireland, in 1835. He was educated in local schools, and survived the Great Famine of the late 1840s. At the age of 20, he left Ireland for California, drawn to prospecting and mining. He searched for gold, but gained mostly experience in prospecting. During the 1860s, he relocated to British Columbia. His prospecting for minerals was devoted mostly to searching for gold.

== Alaska ==
Harper left British Columbia in 1871, before it became more developed. In 1873, he reached Fort Yukon from the Mackenzie River by way of the Porcupine River, and is credited as the first European to enter the area in the search for gold. He managed a store at Fort Yukon with Jack McQuesten (known as Yukon Jack) beside the Fortymile River. They developed a traders' partnership with Captain Mayo, which the three continued for years. They were known for effectively dealing both with prospectors and the Alaska Native peoples. The three partners each married young Alaska Native women and had families there. In 1875, Harper, McQuesten, and Mayo started a trading post that they called Fort Reliance on the Yukon River, supplying miners up and downriver. It became a place of reference in the area, to the extent that prospectors named creeks and rivers in relation to distance from the post, as in Fortymile River and Sixtymile River. Later Dawson City developed about 6 miles (9.7 km) upriver.

After 1889, Harper relocated to the outlet of the Pelly River. After the United States purchased Alaska, it drove the British–Canadian Hudson's Bay Company out. Near the site of Robert Campbell's old Hudson's Bay Company trading post, Harper founded a new post named Fort Selkirk. Harper and Mayo also founded a trading post in Tanana, near the Athabascan site of Nuklukayet. Harper did some mining there, after years of experience in California and British Columbia.

== Personal life ==
After establishing their post, Harper and his partners all married young Athabascan Koyukon women. In 1874, Harper at age 39 married Seentahna (née Bosco), whom he called Jennie, at Koyukuk. Jennie was 14 years old and from the Koyukuk River region. Mayo married Jennie's first cousin, who had taken the name Margaret at the Russian mission school. McQuesten married Satejdenalno, also known as Katherine, or Kate, who had also been educated at the Russian mission school. She spoke Koyukon, Russian and English. Jennie did not have that kind of experience and preserved her traditions.

The Harpers had eight children together, six sons and two daughters: including Andrew, Fred, Sam, and Walter, the youngest boy. An educated man himself, Harper sent the seven older children to boarding schools, mostly in San Francisco, California, each beginning at age five. He felt the mission schools did not offer sufficient quality of education. When his five sons returned, they could no longer speak any of the Athabascan languages. His two daughters later obtained teaching degrees at San Francisco Teachers College. Both of his partners also sent their children "Outside" for education.

After the couple separated permanently in 1895, Harper left for Dawson, and briefly remarried. Jennie reared their youngest son, Walter, in a traditional Koyukon manner. Walter became a mountain climber and guide, and in 1913 made the first ascent of Denali, with the expedition of Hudson Stuck. Harper died of tuberculosis in 1897 in Yuma, Arizona.

== Legacy ==
Harper, "the first man who ever came to the Yukon country seeking gold", was selected for the Alaska Mining Hall of Fame because of his importance in trade and helping develop the Yukon. Mount Harper in the Ogilvie Mountains, Mount Harper, a 6,515 foot (1,986 m) peak in the Yukon-Tanana Uplands, and Harper Bend, an area of the Tanana River, are named in his honour.
