= Yukon Order of Pioneers =

Fraternal order

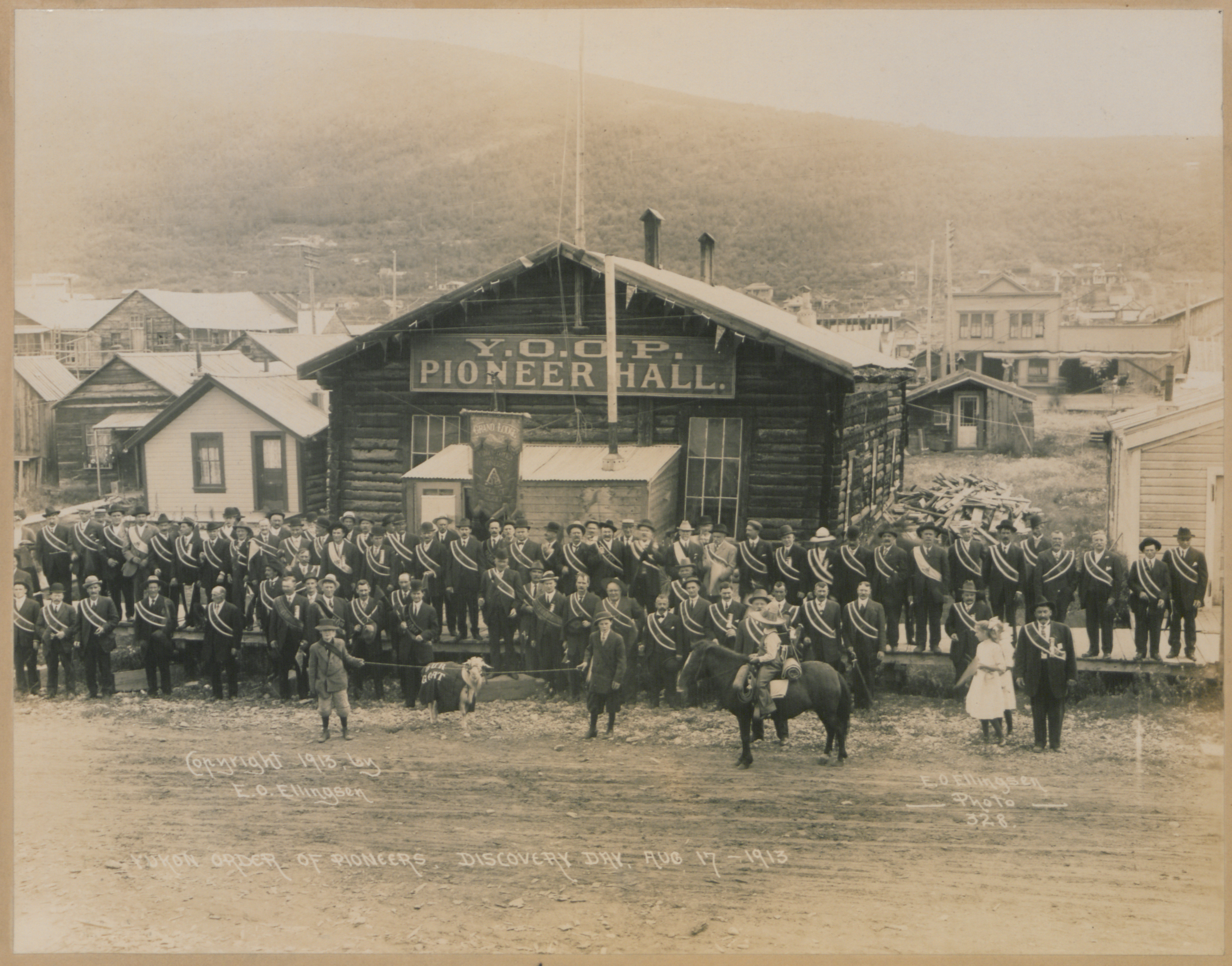
Yukon Order of Pioneers, Discovery Day, August 17, 1913.

The Yukon Order of Pioneers is a fraternal order founded on December 1, 1894 at Forty Mile, Yukon for the purposes of establishing a police force and a fraternal group whose primary concern would be the welfare, security and well-being of its members. Membership was restricted to male persons of integrity and good character who met a ten-year residency requirement. By the early 1900s, the policing activities of the Order were no longer required, and since that time the Order's primary objectives have been social, historical and cultural, with its paramount concern being the welfare and well-being of its members. There are presently two lodges, #1 in Dawson City and #2 in Whitehorse.

The order was involved in a legal dispute over its male-only membership policy from 1987 to 1996. With the support of some members, four women from Dawson City, Madeleine Gould, Margie Fry, Vi Campbell and Susan Herrmann, applied for membership and were rejected. The case was taken up by the Yukon Human Rights Commission and ended up at the Supreme Court of Canada, which upheld the policy 7-2, with both woman justices dissenting.
