= Fortymile River =

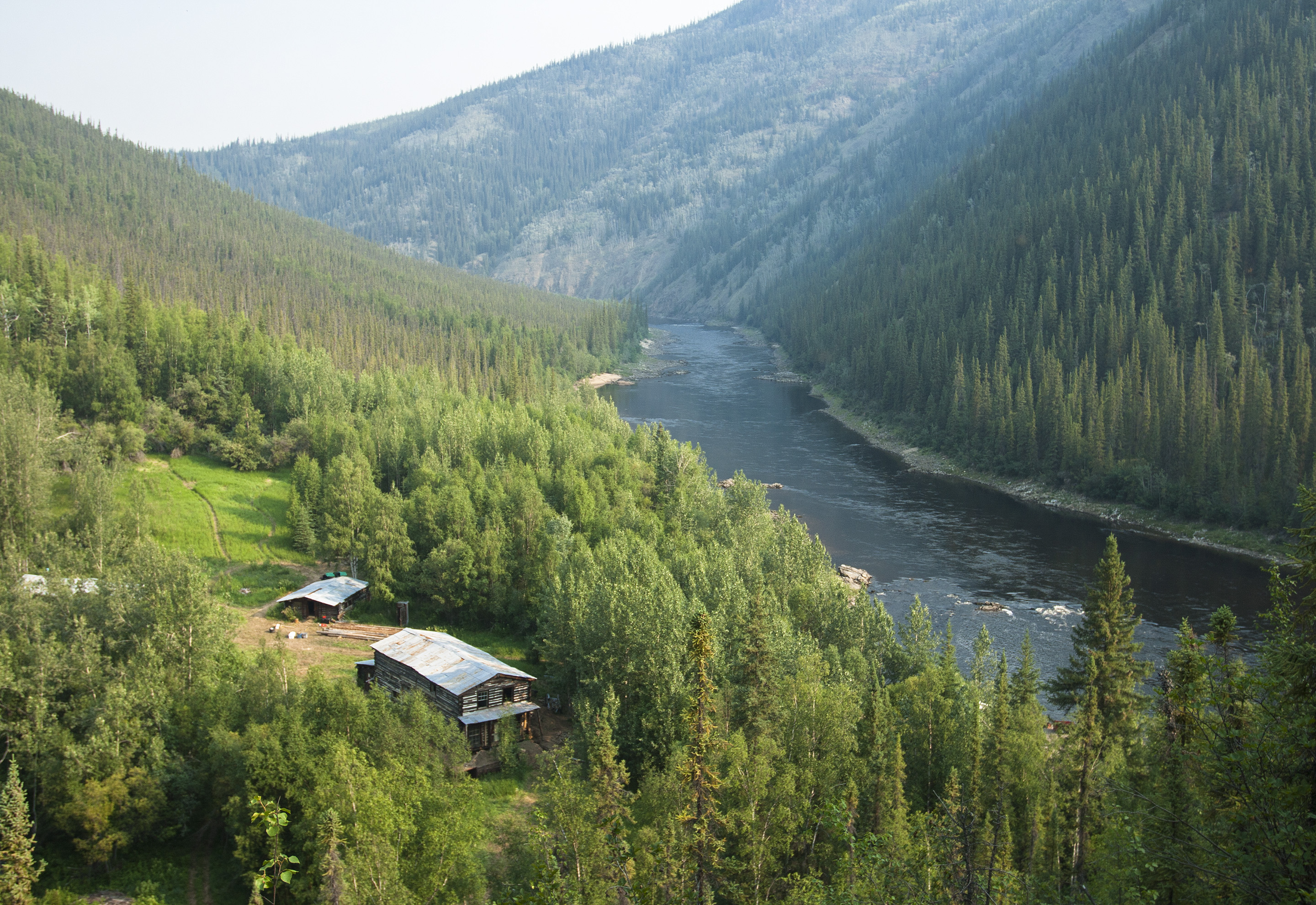
- The Fortymile River in eastern Alaska

- Location of the mouth of the Fortymile River in Yukon
- Native name: Ch'èdà Dëk (Hän)

Location
- Countries: United States; Canada
- States/Territories: Alaska; Yukon

Physical characteristics
- Source: confluence of the river's North Fork and South Fork
  - location: northwest of Chicken, Alaska, United States
  - coordinates: 64°14′34″N 141°45′15″W
  - elevation: 1,424 m (4,672 ft)
- Mouth: Yukon River
  - location: Forty Mile, Yukon, Canada
  - coordinates: 64°25′35″N 140°32′00″W
  - elevation: 950 ft (290 m)
- Length: 60 mi (97 km)
- Basin size: 6,600 sq mi (17,000 km^{2})

National Wild and Scenic River
- Type: Wild 179 miles (288 km); Scenic 203 miles (327 km); Recreational 10.0 miles (16.1 km)
- Designated: December 2, 1980

The Fortymile River is a 60-mile (97 km) tributary of the Yukon River in the U.S. state of Alaska and the Canadian territory of Yukon. Beginning at the confluence of its north and south forks in the Southeast Fairbanks Census Area, the Fortymile flows generally northeast into Canada to meet the larger river 32 miles (51 km) southeast of Eagle, Alaska.

== History ==
Prospectors named the river after gold was discovered there in 1886. The name reflected the distance of the river mouth from Fort Reliance, a former Hudson's Bay Company post upstream along the Yukon River. Miners eventually extracted more than a half-million ounces of gold from the Fortymile watershed. After the gold discovery, two Alaska Commercial Company traders, Jack McQuesten and Arthur Harper, built a post at the mouth of the river.

Between 1968 and 1978, Cassiar Mining extracted about a million metric tons of asbestos from three open pits along Clinton Creek, a tributary of lower Fortymile River in the Yukon. After abandoning the site, the company went bankrupt in 1992, and the territorial and Canadian governments and others removed or buried mine wastes, stabilized the creek banks, and worked to partly restore the land.

== Wild and scenic designation ==
In 1980, a total of 392 miles (631 km) of stream segments within the Alaska portion of the Fortymile River watershed were added to the National Wild and Scenic Rivers System of the United States. This included 179 miles (288 km) designated "wild", 203 miles (327 km) called "scenic", and 10 miles (16 km) designated "recreational".

The Bureau of Land Management oversees the Fortymile Wild and Scenic River, accessible via the Taylor Highway in Alaska as well the Clinton Creek Road branching off from the Top of the World Highway in the Yukon Territory. Float trips, camping, and sightseeing are among the recreational possibilities in the watershed.

== Climate ==
Climate data for Fortymile River, Alaska, 2005–2017 normals: 1252ft (382m)
Month	Jan	Feb	Mar	Apr	May	Jun	Jul	Aug	Sep	Oct	Nov	Dec	Year
Record high °F (°C)	30 (−1)	47 (8)	59 (15)	71 (22)	87 (31)	94 (34)	93 (34)	90 (32)	76 (24)	59 (15)	33 (1)	31 (−1)	94 (34)
Mean maximum °F (°C)	15.6 (−9.1)	28.7 (−1.8)	48.4 (9.1)	59.5 (15.3)	78.4 (25.8)	83.9 (28.8)	84.5 (29.2)	82.9 (28.3)	68.8 (20.4)	50.5 (10.3)	22.6 (−5.2)	17.6 (−8.0)	86.8 (30.4)
Mean daily maximum °F (°C)	−6.3 (−21.3)	3.8 (−15.7)	23.7 (−4.6)	47.2 (8.4)	61.7 (16.5)	71.3 (21.8)	72.4 (22.4)	68.2 (20.1)	55.8 (13.2)	31.8 (−0.1)	2.7 (−16.3)	−2.8 (−19.3)	35.8 (2.1)
Daily mean °F (°C)	−14.3 (−25.7)	−8.4 (−22.4)	3.5 (−15.8)	30.3 (−0.9)	46.3 (7.9)	56.1 (13.4)	58.6 (14.8)	54.1 (12.3)	43.3 (6.3)	23.2 (−4.9)	−5.0 (−20.6)	−10.6 (−23.7)	23.1 (−4.9)
Mean daily minimum °F (°C)	−22.4 (−30.2)	−20.6 (−29.2)	−16.7 (−27.1)	13.4 (−10.3)	31.0 (−0.6)	40.9 (4.9)	44.8 (7.1)	40.0 (4.4)	30.8 (−0.7)	14.6 (−9.7)	−12.7 (−24.8)	−18.4 (−28.0)	10.4 (−12.0)
Mean minimum °F (°C)	−44.4 (−42.4)	−41.2 (−40.7)	−37.5 (−38.6)	−4.5 (−20.3)	21.7 (−5.7)	31.2 (−0.4)	35.4 (1.9)	27.6 (−2.4)	18.4 (−7.6)	−6.9 (−21.6)	−32.8 (−36.0)	−38.8 (−39.3)	−47.2 (−44.0)
Record low °F (°C)	−64 (−53)	−64 (−53)	−63 (−53)	−28 (−33)	14 (−10)	18 (−8)	22 (−6)	19 (−7)	4 (−16)	−24 (−31)	−50 (−46)	−51 (−46)	−64 (−53)
Source: XMACIS2

== Boating ==
The Fortymile River main stem as well as the North Fork, South Fork, and other tributaries offer a variety of boating possibilities for experienced paddlers of rafts and kayaks, or experienced canoeists willing to portage around difficult rapids. The many runnable segments vary from Class I (easy) on the International Scale of River Difficulty to Class V (extremely difficult). In addition to rapids, dangers include overhanging or submerged vegetation and the high probability of confusing one bend in a stream with another—thus entering rapids disoriented and unprepared—without the aid of a map and compass.

One of the watershed's hydrologic features, the Kink, is an artificial channel that is part of a Class V rapids on the North Fork. Mining interests blasted the channel through a ridge in 1904 in order to expose 3 miles (5 km) of the original riverbed for prospecting on dry land. The Kink is listed on the National Register of Historic Places as a significant engineering feat of the early 20th century.

== See also ==
- List of rivers of Alaska
- List of rivers of Yukon
