= Peel watershed =

Peel Watershed
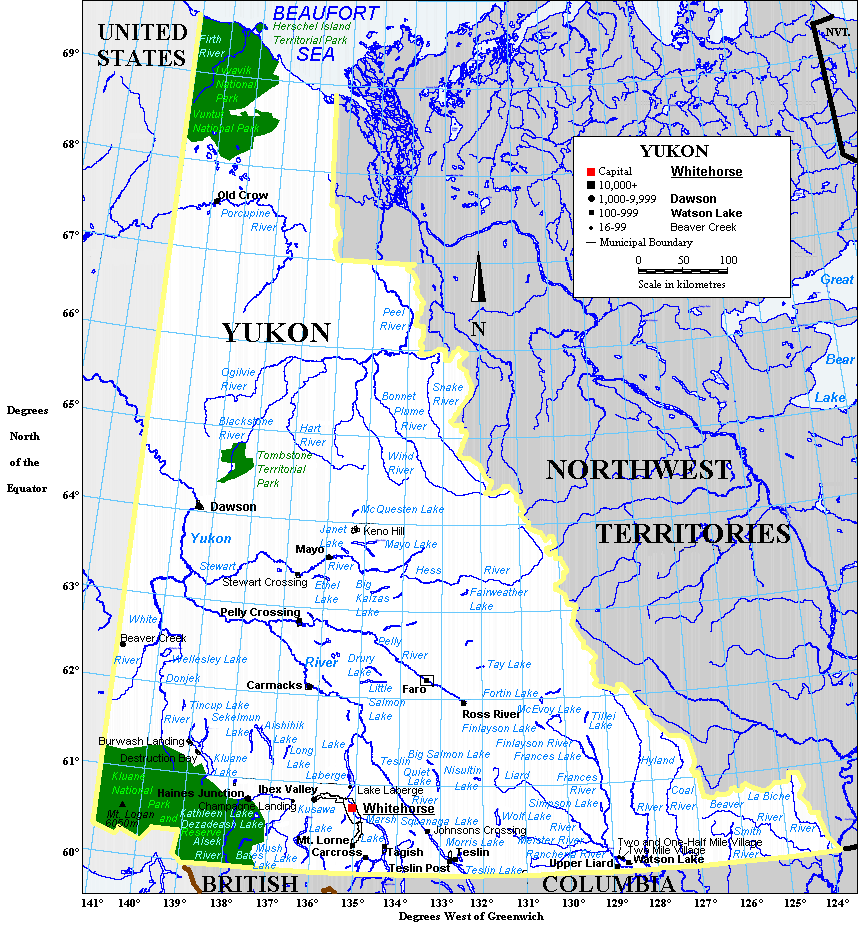
- Map of the Yukon
- Etymology: Peel, for Sir Robert Peel, British Home Secretary, 1822-1827

Location
- Country: Canada
- Region: Yukon, Northwest Territory

Physical characteristics
- Source: Blackstone/Ogilvie confluence
  - location: Yukon
  - coordinates: 61°51′15″N 137°15′13″W
  - elevation: 1,366 ft (416 m)
- Mouth: Mackenzie River
  - location: Northwest Territory
  - coordinates: 61°41′50″N 134°32′21″W
  - elevation: 32 ft (9.8 m)

Basin features
- River system: Peel River

The Peel watershed drains 14% of the Yukon Territory, Canada, and flows into the Beaufort Sea via the Peel and then Mackenzie Rivers. While the lower part of the Peel River and its confluence with the Mackenzie River are in the NorthWest Territories, most of the watershed, 68,000 km^{2} out of 77,000 km^{2} is in the Yukon. Six major tributaries and numerous smaller streams feed the Peel. The Yukon portion of the watershed is undergoing land use planning, a process laid out in Chapter 11 of the Yukon Land Claims Agreement and is called the Peel Watershed Planning Region (PWPR). This article is confined to the PWPR.

There are no communities within the Yukon's PWPR, although it is within the Traditional Territories of, and extensively utilized by four First Nations: The Na-cho Nyak Dun, the Tetlit Gwich'in, the Vuntut Gwitchin and the Tr’ondëk Hwëch’in. These people, along with the now-gone Tukudh Gwich’in, have lived and travelled in the region for millennia; some of the earliest evidence of humanity in Canada is within Vuntut Gwitchin territory at Bluefish Caves. For the Tetlit Gwich’in, the Peel is the centre of their world; the name Tetlit Gwich’in means “people who live at the head of the waters" [2]. They and the Vuntut Gwitchin are caribou people; caribou provided food, clothing, tools, and shelter. In early times vast caribou fences were made to intercept the migrating caribou and funnel them into corrals so they could be taken with spears, snares, and bow and arrow. Once rifles were adopted, the caribou fences were reabsorbed by the land, and now the only traces left are in Vuntut National Park. Fences were needed because caribou are consummate travelers; the Porcupine Caribou Herd travels from the Peel into Alaska, from the Beaufort Sea to the Yukon River. The Tr’ondëk Hwëch'in and the Na-cho Nyak Dun would also travel into the Peel for caribou. To this day, they still do, and trap for fur, harvest small game, and gather plants.

The Peel was named in 1826 by Sir John Franklin after Sir Robert Peel, who was British Home Secretary (later Prime Minister) at the time. It was first explored by Europeans in 1839 when John Bell of the Hudson's Bay Company ascended it as far as the Snake River. It was not fully surveyed until 1909 despite being the only route used by fur traders into the interior of the Yukon until the gold rush years of the 1890s. The Yukon part of the watershed contains six major tributaries to the Peel; from west to east: the Ogilvie, Blackstone, Hart, Wind, Bonnet Plume and Snake Rivers. The Bonnet Plume is a Canadian Heritage River.

== Geography ==
The PWPR is in the North East Yukon; its southernmost point is near Duo Lakes at about 64°N, the Eastern boundary is the border with the NWT about 131° W, its furthest west extent is in Tombstone Park at about 140°W and the north boundary is the Yukon/NWT border at 67° N. The closest communities are Mayo Yukon, directly south of the watershed, Dawson City Yukon, South West of the watershed and Fort McPherson and Tsiigehtchic Northwest Territories to the North. No body lives permanently within the region, and there is only one road; the gravel Dempster Highway skirts its western limits. Several big game outfitters have seasonal camps, the tributaries are world class wilderness rivers attracting canoeists and hikers from around the world, and the First Nations hunt, gather and trap throughout the region much as has been done for millennia.

== Ecoregions ==
The Peel Watershed is primarily within the Boreal Taiga ecozone, with the lower lying parts in the north within the Taiga Plains ecozone. The two ecozones of the PWPR are further divided into ecoregions: Peel River Plateau and Fort McPherson Plain in the Taiga Plains ecozone, and British/Richardson Mountains, North Ogilvie Mountains, Eagle Plains and Mackenzie Mountains in the Boreal Taiga ecozone. Of these ecoregions in Yukon, the British/Richardson Mountains are partially protected by Ivvavik National Park and Vuntut National Parks and by the Old Crow Flats Special Management Area(SMA), the Fort McPherson Plains do not contain any protected areas, the Peel Plateau has no protection at present, the North Ogilvie's are partially protected by Fishing Branch Territorial Park, Eagle Plains is not significantly protected, although a small portion is within Fishing Branch Park and the Mackenzie Mountains are partially protected by Tombstone Territorial Park.

== Wildlife ==
The Peel Watershed is home to relatively undisturbed populations of wildlife, including moose, Dall Sheep and Fannin Sheep, Barren Ground (the Porcupine herd) and Northern Mountain Woodland Caribou ( the Hart, Clear Creek and Bonnet Plume herds) and Yukon's only boreal caribou. Because of the relative abundance of these animals, their predators also thrive and there are healthy populations of Wolves, Wolverines, Grizzlies and Black bears. The range of the Ogilvie Mountain Collared Lemming extends into the watershed. This lemming is a Yukon endemic. Extensive wetlands support migratory waterfowl, particularly the Turner Lake wetlands, Chappie and Margaret lakes. Trappers harvest primarily marten and lynx.

== Plant life and Beringia ==
Much of this area has escaped glaciation for millions of years and comprises part of Beringia. Because of this, many of the plants are more characteristic of Asia than the Americas or are endemic to the region. This endemism is particularly marked near mountains that provided moist refugia during glaciations.

== The case for protecting the Peel Watershed: climate change ==
This part of the world is going to feel some of the most extreme effects of climate change; by 2100 it is projected that average temperatures could be 10-15 degrees warmer. Recent studies in climate adaptation suggest that the best hedge against climate disruption may lie within landscapes characterized by inherent resilience. Such areas have substantial adaptive capacity, and the ability to absorb the disturbances created by climate change, because of their immense scale, relative intactness, still-functional ecosystems, high degree of ecological representation and redundancy, high potential for creation of climate refugia, and a high degree of robust or restorable connectivity.

Another strategy is to protect features and areas that acted as refugia during past climatic changes such as glaciation. A refugium is a geographical region that has remained unaltered by a climatic change affecting surrounding regions and that therefore forms a haven for remnant fauna and flora. Such refugia are centers of genetic, and sometimes species, diversity. Such strategies as these focus on retaining characteristics of landscapes and regions in order to allow ecological systems to respond on their own to accelerated climate change and other evolving stresses.

The importance of the Peel River ecosystem is not limited to its role in harboring biodiversity and relics of the past. The Peel River stands at an ecological crossroads, connecting boreal forests, arctic tundra, and alpine habitats. Given the pace of current climate change, the Peel may once again become a crucial corridor for the shifting distributions of species.

Probably the best way that we can manage natural systems so as to ensure resilience to climate change is through protecting large habitat areas and links between different ecosystems. The Peel is exactly such a place – large, untrammeled, and providing linkage between different elevations, habitat types, latitudes, and biomes. Conservation targets should also include ecosystems, like peat lands on the Peel Plateau that sequester much carbon. Maintaining such ecosystems could be globally significant in reducing emissions of carbon dioxide and methane from standing biomass and decomposing organic matter, thus reducing the feedback mechanism that enhances the greenhouse effect and accelerates global warming. Ecological Inertia: refers to the characteristic of landscapes to resist change, for example a white spruce dominated boreal forest could persist under climatic conditions that have warmed and dried to produce conditions that are more suitable for Aspen Parklands. Should some event take place to upset this inertia - in the case of a boreal forest this would most likely be a forest fire - the ecosystem that takes its place would be more like the Aspen Parkland. Essentially, new species cannot move in or displace existing species until space is created for them. Intact, undisturbed, ecosystems are the best way to promote this inertia and the species that exist there.

== Peel Watershed and Y2Y ==
The Yellowstone to Yukon Conservation Initiative (Y2Y) is a joint Canada-US not-for-profit organization that seeks to preserve and maintain the wildlife, native plants, wilderness and natural processes of the mountainous region from Yellowstone National Park to the Yukon Territory. It aims to do this by maintaining intact large scale landscapes that will focus on grizzly bears, birds and fish as indicator species of ecosystem health. The PWPR is the northern anchor of the Y2Y region, and if the entire watershed were to be protected, it would double the area within the Y2Y region that has been protected since Y2Y began in 1997. Even partial protection would be a significant conservation gain given future potential ecological upheaval through climate change and the fragmentation of habitat in the southern part of the Y2Y region.

== Land use planning ==
The Umbrella Final Agreement of the Yukon Indian Land Claims Agreement lays out how land-use planning will proceed in Yukon. The Yukon is divided into regions roughly analogous to First Nation Traditional Territories. The affected First Nations have jurisdiction over their settlement lands within the Planning Region while Yukon Government has the final say over how crown lands will be disposed of. Land-use planning is, however, a collaborative process with many opportunities for public input. While Yukon First Nations relinquished aboriginal title to their traditional territories when they signed their final agreements, this was done in return for a constitutionally protected and meaningful role in land-use planning in their traditional territories.

A Planning Commission consisting of members nominated by First Nations and Yukon Government was formed on October 15, 2004, to guide the process. The Commission's goal is to "ensure wilderness characteristics, wildlife and their habitats, cultural resources, and waters are maintained over time while managing resource use. These uses include, but are not limited to, traditional use, trapping, recreation, outfitting, wilderness tourism, subsistence harvesting, and the exploration and development of non-renewable resources. Achieving this goal requires managing development at a pace and scale that maintains ecological integrity. The long-term objective is to return all lands to their natural state".

In July 2011, the Peel Watershed Planning Commission produced a Final Recommended Peel Watershed Regional Land Use Plan that calls for 55% of the region be fully protected as Special Management Areas. 25% would be designated as wilderness areas, meaning that they would have interim protection; the status of the land would be reviewed each time the plan itself is reviewed. In the remaining 19.4%, "non renewable resource-use opportunities … can be…encouraged subject to key land-use and environmental management considerations, including enhanced community consultation where specified". In November 2012, the Yukon government presented a set of counter-proposals which would allow for a much higher level of industrial development in the area than envisioned by the Final Recommended Plan.

== Mineral exploration ==
To date, no significant extraction of mineral resources has taken place within the PWPR, with the exception of gravel pits for construction and maintenance of the Dempster Highway. The Peel Plateau and Eagle Plains ecoregions contain what is considered to be the best candidates for Oil & Gas development within the region. There are 13 significant mineral occurrences in the PWPR, of which two are large and well defined deposits: the Crest iron ore deposit in the Snake River basin and the Bonnet Plume Coal deposit in the neighbouring valley. The Crest Deposit belongs to Chevron. Unless this deposit is developed, it is unlikely that any of the other deposits will be viable as they would need to piggy back on the infrastructure development required- roads, railways and pipelines. Despite the uncertainty around the tenure and viability of minerals deposits in the PWPR, a large proportion, (6,773) of the 8,431 claims active in the PWPR were staked since the start of the planning process. A one-year staking moratorium was instituted on February 4, 2010 and extended in February 2011 for an additional year or until the final plan is approved.

== Economy ==
While mineral exploration was valued at about $6 million a year from 2006 to 2008, there is no mining at present and no oil and gas exploration is underway. There is, however, a guide and outfitter industry. There are six big game outfitters that operate all or partly in the PWPR who hunt mostly for sheep, moose, caribou and bears. This industry generates $2–3 million a year and can continue indefinitely as long as there are large areas of wilderness to support wildlife. The navigable rivers of the Peel attract Canadian and international tourists and are supported by up to 20 wilderness guides. This industry generates about $500,000/year in direct income and is even more dependent on undisturbed wilderness than big game hunting. Wilderness tourism has the potential for significant sustainable growth if managed appropriately. The Dempster Highway is a significant source of visitors to the region and has the only road access and established campgrounds.

== The First Nation of Nacho Nyak Dun v. Yukon (Government of) ==
On December 1, 2017, in the First Nation of Nacho Nyak Dun v. Yukon (Government of), the Supreme Court of Canada overturned a Yukon government decision to open the Peel watershed for development and significantly modify the Peel Watershed Planning Commission's final recommended plan. The court ruled that the final agreements with a number of First Nations, which enabled the commission and provided for the land use planning process, did not permit Yukon to make such dramatic modifications to the commission's plan.
