= Firth River =

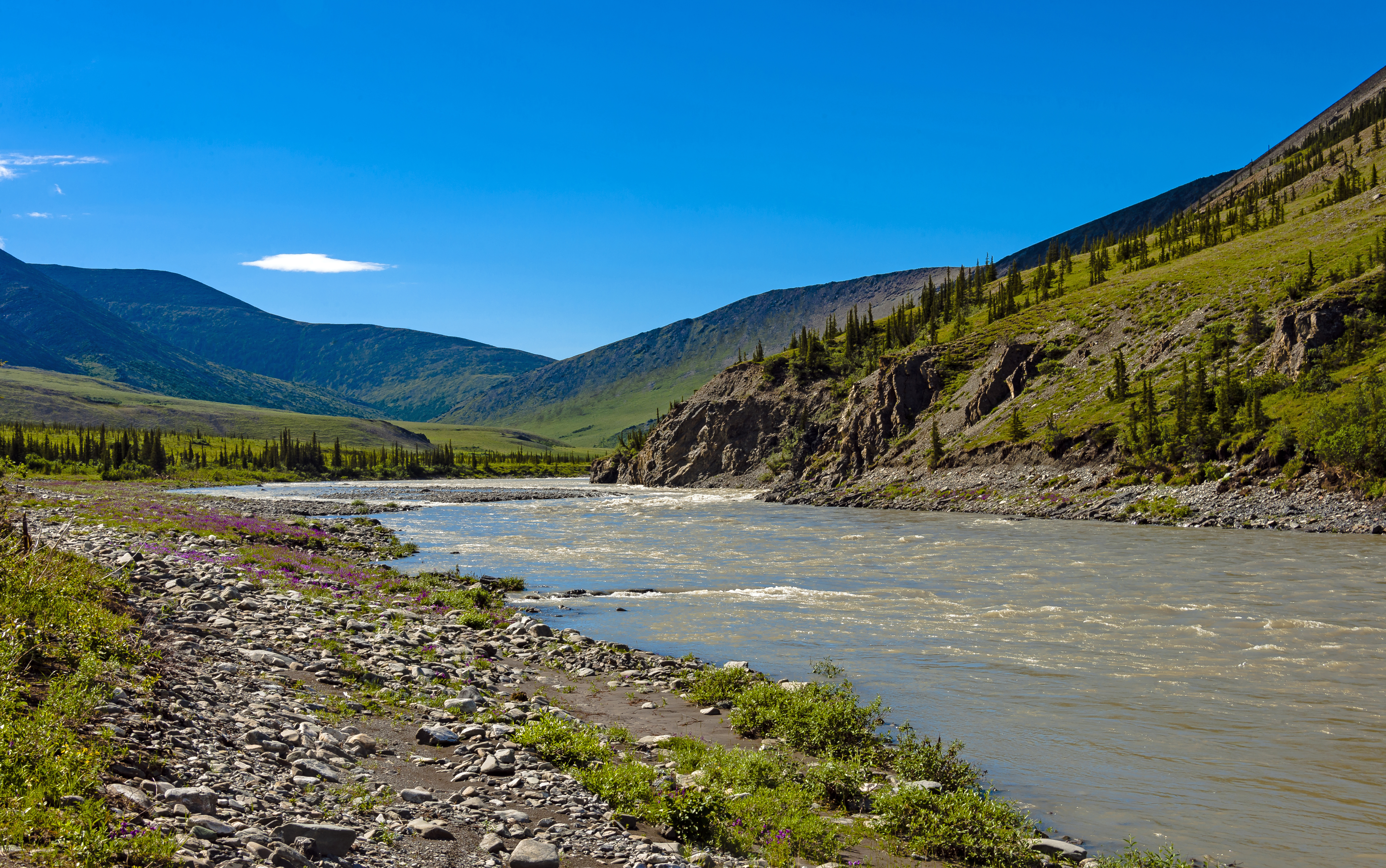
- Firth River above Wolf Creek confluence, Ivvavik National Park

Location
- Countries: United States, Canada
- States: Alaska, Yukon

Physical characteristics
- Source
  - coordinates: 68°28′40″N 141°53′31″W
- Mouth: Beaufort Sea, Arctic Ocean
  - location: South of Herschel Island
  - coordinates: 69°33′00″N 139°30′00″W
  - elevation: 0 ft (0 m)

Firth River is a major river in Yukon, Canada. It begins at the east side of Davidson Mountains and flows into the Beaufort Sea of the Arctic Ocean, just south of Herschel Island.
