= Snake River (Yukon) =

River in Yukon, Canada

Coordinates: 65°58′51.4″N 134°11′46.5″W

The Snake River is in the Yukon Territory near the Northwest Territories border. It is the furthest east river in the Peel watershed, a major tributary of the Mackenzie River.

The Snake is 300 km (186 mi) in length. The headwaters of the river are in the Werneke Mountains.

The name in Gwich'in is Gyuu Dazhoo Njik.

== See also ==
- List of rivers of Yukon
