= List of protected areas of Yukon =

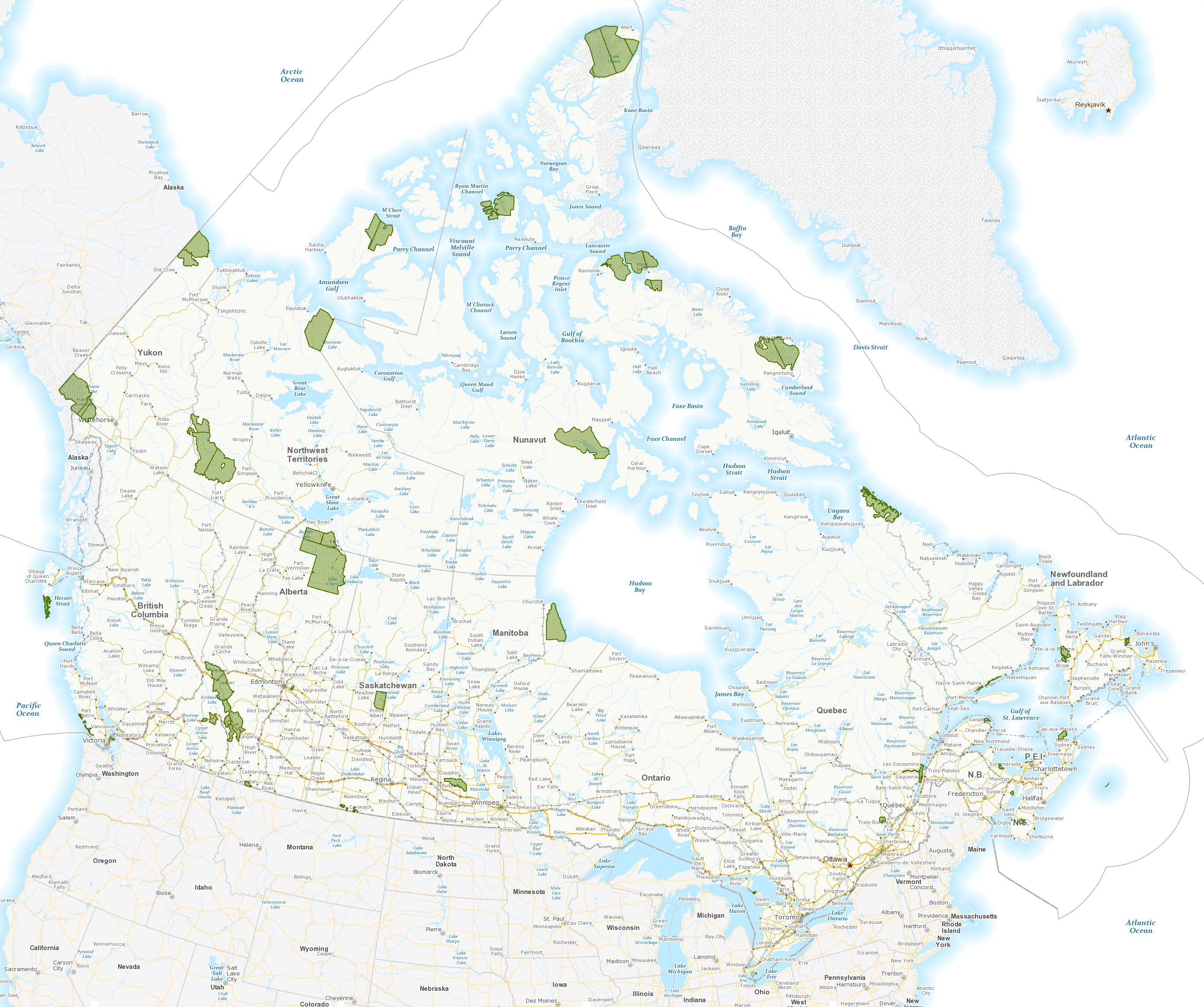
Canada's National Parks and National Reserves by provinces and territories

This is a list of protected areas of Yukon, Canada. The Yukon, formerly called Yukon Territory and sometimes referred to as just Yukon is the smallest and westernmost of Canada's three territories. It also is the least populated province or territory in Canada, with a population of 35,874 people as of the 2016 Census.

== National parks ==
- Ivvavik National Park
- Kluane National Park and Reserve
- Vuntut National Park

== Territorial parks ==
- Coal River Springs Territorial Park
- Kusawa Territorial Park
- Ni'iinlii'njik (Fishing Branch) Territorial Park
- Qikiqtaruk Territorial Park
- Tombstone Territorial Park

Parks that haven't been formally established yet (declared as "parks in progress"):

- Agay Mene Territorial Park
- Asi Keyi Territorial Park
- Dàadzàii Vàn Territorial Park

== Habitat protection and special management areas ==
- Ch'ihilii Chìk (Whitefish Wetlands) Habitat Protection Area
- Ddhaw Ghro Habitat Protection Area
- Devil's Elbow and Big Island Habitat Protection Area
- Ni'iinlii Njik (Fishing Branch) Wilderness Preserve and Habitat Protection Area
- Nuna K'óhonete Yédäk Tah'é (Horseshoe Slough) Habitat Protection Area
- Łύtsäw Wetland Habitat Protection Area
- Mandanna Lake
- Pickhandle Lakes Habitat Protection Area
- Tagish River Habitat Protection Area
- Ta'tla Mun Special Management Area
- Tsâwnjuk Chu (Nordenskiold) Habitat Protection Area
- Van Tat K'atr'anahtii (Old Crow Flats) Special Management Area

== See also ==
- List of Canadian provincial parks
- List of National Parks of Canada
