= Herschel Island =

Island in Yukon, Canada

Native name: Qikiqtaruk
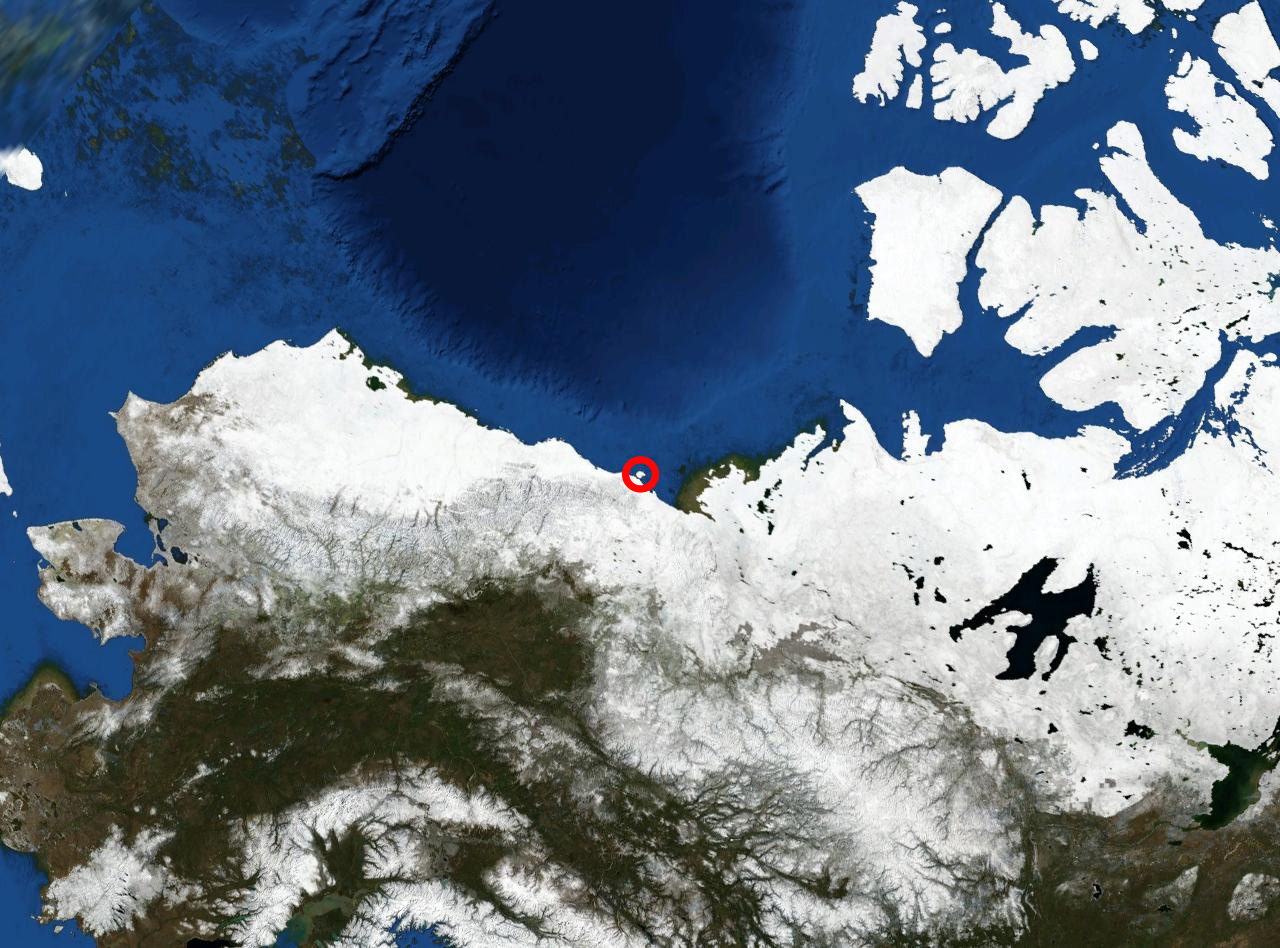
- Location of Herschel Island

- Location within Yukon Location within Canada

Geography
- Location: Yukon
- Coordinates: 69°35′23″N 139°05′57″W
- Area: 116 km^{2} (45 sq mi)
- Width: 8–15 km (5.0–9.3 mi)
- Highest elevation: 596 ft (181.7 m)

Administration
- Canada
- Territory: Yukon

Demographics
- Population: 0 (2009)

Herschel Island (French: Île d'Herschel; Inuvialuktun: Qikiqtaruk) is an island in the Beaufort Sea (part of the Arctic Ocean), which lies 5 km (3.1 mi) off the coast of Yukon in Canada, of which it is administratively a part. Part of the Arctic Archipelago, it is Yukon's only large offshore island.

== History ==
=== Early history ===
The earliest evidence of human occupation unearthed so far by archaeological investigations is that of the Thule people, dating to approximately 1000 years ago. These people are the ancestors of the present-day Inuvialuit. The Inuvialuktun word for Herschel Island is Qikiqtaruk, which simply means 'island'.

The first European to sight the island was explorer Sir John Franklin, who named it on 15 July 1826. It is not clear after whom the island was named. Franklin's journal records states that he wished to honour the name Herschel, of which three persons are notable for their scientific accomplishments: Sir William Herschel, his sister Caroline Herschel, and his son Sir John Herschel.; At the time of Franklin's explorations there were three Inuvialuit settlements on Herschel Island. Estimates of the number of people living on the island (and along the Yukon North Slope) at that time ranged from 200 to 2,000. The island was used as a base for hunting, fishing and whaling.

=== The whaling period ===
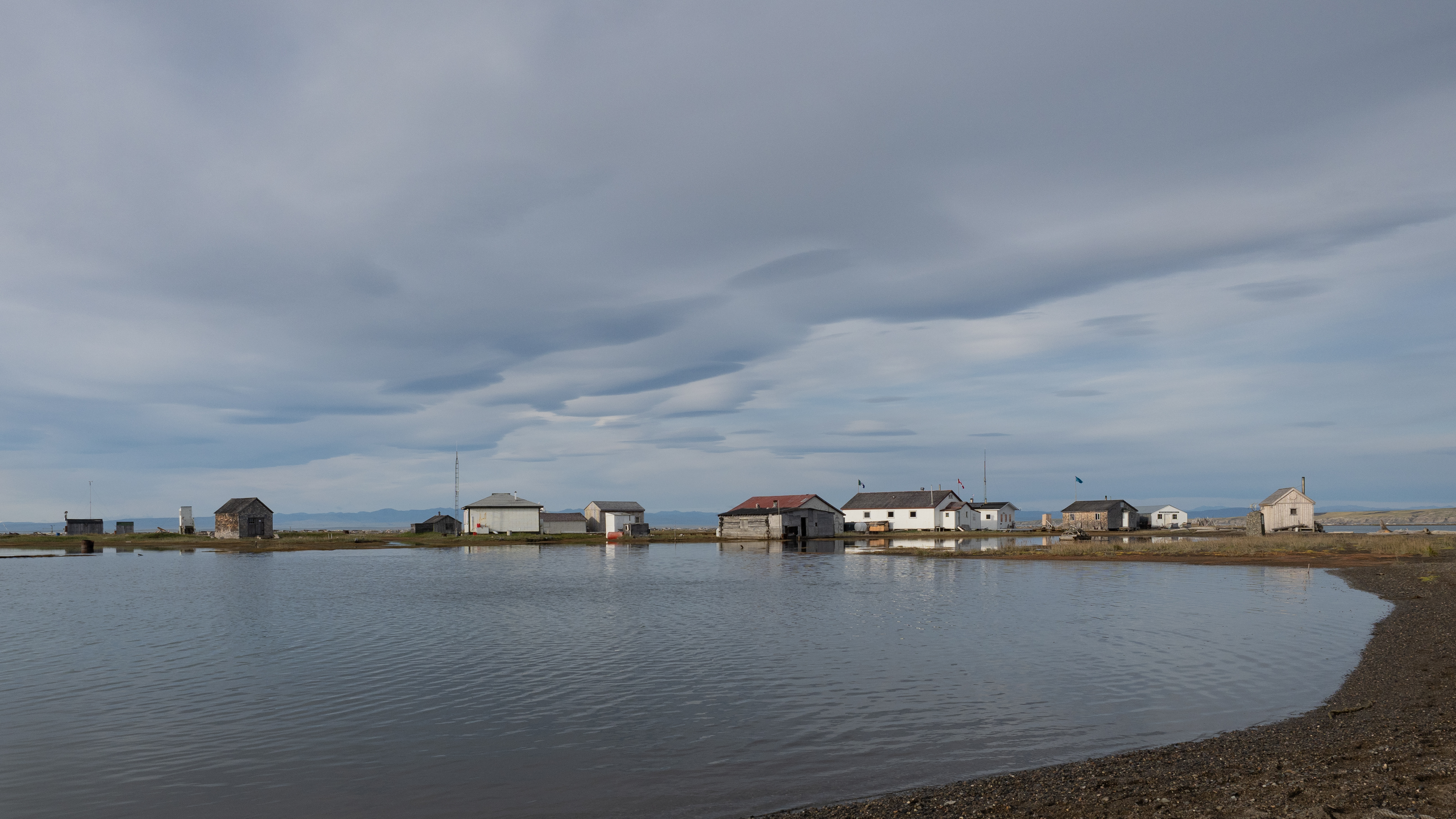
The whaling settlement at Pauline Cove. The Yukon mainland is visible in the background.

In the late 19th century, whalers discovered that the Beaufort Sea was one of the last refuges of the depleted bowhead whale, which was prized for its baleen (whalebone), blubber, and oil. Commercial bowhead hunting in the area began in 1889. In order for the short Arctic whaling season to be profitable, it was necessary to overwinter in the area. Herschel Island was found to have a good harbour for large whalers. In 1890 a Euro-American settlement was established at Pauline Cove. At the height of the Beaufort Sea whaling period (1893–94) the number of residents on the island was estimated at 1,500, making it the largest Yukon community at that time. Though several frame buildings had been constructed, most residents continued to live on the whalers.

In 1893, the Pacific Steam Whaling Company (PSW Co.) constructed a building called the Community House at Pauline Cove. With a recreation room, an office for the manager and storekeeper, and storage facilities, the Community House became the most prominent building on the island. In 1896 the company offered the house to the Anglican church, who used the building until 1906.

In 1903, Francis Joseph Fitzgerald was the first North-West Mounted Police (NWMP) officer assigned to the area, who later died in the famous "Lost Patrol".

In 1911, the Royal North-West Mounted Police purchased all Herschel Island assets of the PSW Co. for $1,500. The Community House still stands, and is believed to be the oldest frame building in Yukon. It remains in excellent condition, and is now used as a park office and visitor centre.

=== Application of law against Indigenous population ===
In 1909, the first special constable was hired on Herschel Island. Generally, the cooperation of the Inuvialuit population, who worked as specials, and the general support the Mounted Police by the local population enabled the policing system on Herschel Island.

Canadian lawmen began to act in the area as arbiters of British justice and tended to be determined to apply their systems of law aggressively, as they felt they had been lenient in other regional murder trials. Members of the Inuvialuit population recollect a random application of law against the Indigenous population, including episodes of rape and assault by white police against Inuvialuit women. Inuvialuit women also recollect that white police would threaten them with prison time or hangings unless they were married to Inuvialuit men.

This period also represented the first Inuit tried and executed for murder under Canadian law. In December 1921, Corporal W.A. Doak, accompanied by Inuit members of the police, investigated some killings of Inuit by other Inuit on Kiillinnguyaq, formerly the Kent Peninsula. A short investigation, aided by community support, resulted in the arrest of Alikomiak (aged 16–19 years) and Tatamigana (unknown age). A third man, Ikalukpiak, had been arrested earlier and was grouped with the two other men, though they were not confined as a result of a lack of lock-up. On the night of 1 April 1922, Alikomiak shot the sleeping Doak in the leg. The next morning, he shot Otto Binder, a fur trader with the Hudson's Bay Company. On the return of the second member of the Royal Canadian Mounted Police (RCMP), who had been on patrol during the shootings, an unresisting Alikomiak was tied up and brought with the other Inuit to Herschel Island for trial. Testimony from Alikomiak suggested the murder of Doak was motivated by fear of abuse, while the attack against Binder was motivated by Alikomiak's fear that on seeing Doak's body, Binder would retaliate against him.

There were four trials of Alikomiak and Tatamigana which followed, all of which were brief and appeared predecided. The trial was a show trial, intended as a demonstration of force by Canadian law enforcement against the Inuit, as well as a demonstration to the world of Canada's claims to sovereign rights in the Arctic. Herschel Island was chosen as the site for the trial because of its accessibility and because it was the only community along the Arctic coast that had significant buildings, a result of the whaling economy in the area. Alikomiak was eventually sentenced for killing whites, while Tatamigana was sentenced for killing an Inuk, and both were sentenced to hang. Some bishops and locals protested the sentences and recommended other punishments, particularly because of Alikomiak's young age, though local newspapers tended to favour the verdict and the Canadian government refused to commute it.

One evening late in winter, while following their customary occupation of making salmon nets, they were informed that they were to be hanged next morning at three o’clock. Young Alekámiaq received the news with a smile. The other man, who was somewhat older, felt as if he was choking and asked for a glass of water; having taken a drink he too was ready to meet his fate. Just before they were to be executed they gave the wife of the police sergeant some small souvenirs carved in walrus ivory, as a sign that they bore no malice towards the police. They ascended the scaffold with great calmness and met death without fear.

— Rasmussen, Knud, Intellectual culture of the Copper Eskimos (1932)

=== Missionaries, police, and traders ===
Anglican missionary Isaac Stringer first visited Herschel Island in 1893. He returned with his wife in 1896, and ministered to the people there until his departure in 1901. Stringer and other missionaries attempted to build a church on the island, but were not successful. A mission house was constructed in 1916 by Reverend Whittaker. This building still stands, but is in poor condition.

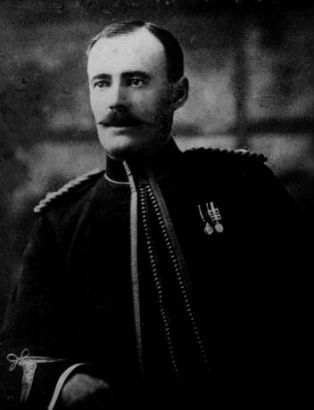
Francis Joseph Fitzgerald, first North-West Mounted Police officer assigned to Herschel Island (1903)

In 1903, Francis Joseph Fitzgerald, a North-West Mounted Police Inspector visited Herschel Island. The following year, he and Constable Sutherland established a detachment on the island, which was at first based in two small sod huts. From 1910 to 1931 Herschel Island was subdistrict headquarters for the NWMP and, after 1920, the RCMP in the western part of the Canadian Arctic. Command was transferred to Aklavik in 1931, and Herschel Island was patrolled intermittently until 1948, when the detachment was reopened on a seasonal basis. On 16 February 1918, Herschel Island suffered its first loss of a police officer. Constable Alexander Lamont age 30, Badge Number 5548 Royal Northwest Mounted Police died of a duty-related illness. Constable Lamont died from typhoid fever while on Hershel Island, while attending to the needs of another victim of the disease.

On 14 July 1958, Herschel Island suffered another loss of a police officer. Constable Carl Lennart Sundell, aged 24 years, was stationed on board the RCMP supply schooner Herschel at the time of his death and died as a result of an accidental shooting. He was shot while boarding the vessel which was in a cradle onshore for repairs. The RCMP post was closed permanently in 1964.

In 1915 the Hudson's Bay Company sent Mr. Christy Harding to Herschel Island to establish a post. Soon after his arrival he constructed a store, house, warehouse, and several other buildings. Business at the post was never lucrative. In 1937 the Bay closed its doors on the island, and its buildings were abandoned. None of them remain.

In 1926 the Northern Whaling and Trading Company, owned and operated by Christian Theodore Pedersen, constructed a store, warehouse and small shed on the island. These buildings still stand, though in recent years they have been moved as much as 10 m (33 ft) inland, away from the receding shoreline.

=== Modern developments ===
The island did see some renewed activity in the 1970s when it became a temporary safe harbour for oil-drilling ships. Its last permanent, year-round residents (the MacKenzie family) left in 1987. Inuvialuit still use the island seasonally for hunting, fishing, and as a place to camp while travelling.

In 1978, a land claims agreement was reached in principle between the Inuvialuit and the Government of Canada. By 1984, the Inuvialuit Final Agreement (IFA), which led to the Inuvialuit Settlement Region, was in place. In 1987, Qikiqtaruk Territorial Park was created by the Government of Yukon in accordance with the terms of the IFA. The Government of Yukon and the Inuvialuit share responsibility for planning, managing, and protecting Herschel Island's natural and historic resources

== Geography ==
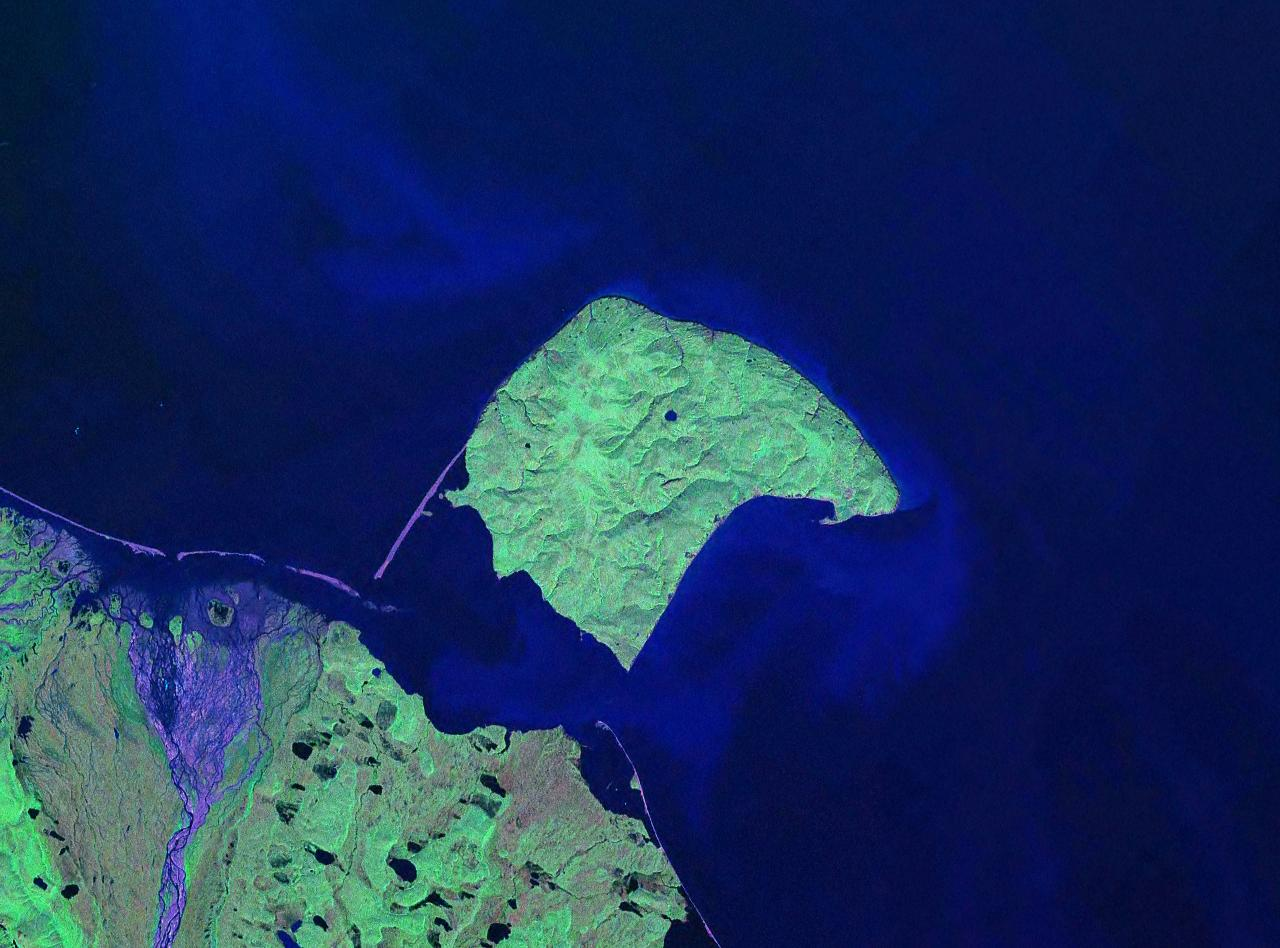
NASA Landsat pseudocolour photo of Herschel Island

Herschel Island has an area of 116 km^{2} (45 sq mi). It is approximately 15 by 8 km (9.3 by 5.0 mi) between shorelines, with a rolling tundra terrain that ranges in height from sea level to 182 m (597 ft).

The island was created from sediments that were thrust up by a lobe of glacier ice from the Laurentide ice sheet emanating from the Mackenzie River valley and moving westward along the coastal plain approximately 30,000 years ago. There is no bedrock core to the island. The island is subject to very high rates of coastal erosion due to the ice-rich nature of the underlying permafrost, and its surface heaves and rolls down its own hillsides from the effects of frost creep and solifluction.

== Climate ==
Herschel Island has a dry-winter tundra climate (Koppen ETw) characterized by long, cold, dry winters and short, cool, moist summers. Strong steady winds are prevalent throughout the year. July is the warmest month, with a mean temperature of 7.4 °C (45.3 °F) and a mean daytime high of 12.8 °C (55.0 °F), but can reach as high as 30 °C (86 °F). January temperatures average −27 to −30 °C (−17 to −22 °F), but temperatures have been known to reach as low as −50 °C (−58 °F).

From November to early June, Herschel Island is locked in ice. Located north of the Arctic Circle, Herschel Island enjoys the midnight sun every year between 19 May and 24 July. Polar night, when the sun does not appear above the horizon, lasts from 29 November to 14 January, but significant twilight is experienced for a few hours in the late morning and early afternoon during the latter period.

== Fish and marine mammals ==
The waters around Herschel Island are a haven for fish and marine mammals. The Mackenzie River flows into the Beaufort Sea southeast of the island. Its warm, nutrient-rich waters drift westward along the mainland shore as far as Herschel. Zooplankton feed on these nutrients, and are in turn eaten by larger fish, seals, and whales. Arctic cod, Arctic char, Pacific herring and Arctic flounder are all found in this area.

Whales travel past Herschel Island on their seasonal migration. Bowhead whales can still be seen from Herschel as they migrate westward to the Bering Sea in September, feeding on krill close to the surface. Beluga whales are also seen from the island during the open water period. Ringed seals are the most common marine mammals in this part of the Arctic, feeding on fish along the edges of the ice during the summer months.

The polar bear is a major predator of ringed seals. In summer they live along the edges of the pack ice near the island. In winter, a few female bears den on the island's northern slopes.

== Land mammals ==
Small herds of Porcupine caribou (or Grant's caribou, Rangifer tarandus grantii) are frequently found on the island in summer. Muskox, and grizzly bears are occasionally seen, crossing to Herschel from the mainland. Lemmings, tundra voles and Arctic shrews are common. Red and Arctic foxes are also known to den on the island. Natal Arctic fox dens are found each year on the island, usually one or two, but occasionally more. Red foxes also reproduce on the island but natal red fox dens are not observed every year.

== Birds ==
At least 94 bird species have been counted on Herschel Island, 40 of which breed there. The island hosts the largest colony of black guillemots in the western Arctic, nesting in the old Anglican mission house. Arctic terns, American golden plovers, and red-necked phalaropes make use of the tundra ponds and shingle beaches. Other birds that breed on the island include the common eider, rough-legged hawk, snow bunting, Lapland longspur, and redpoll.

== Vegetation ==
Herschel Island is situated in the Yukon Coastal Plain ecoregion. The vegetation of this ecoregion is described as Arctic tundra, with continuous ground cover and no trees present.

There are over 200 species of plants on Herschel Island, which occur in a diversity of habitats. Most of the island is composed of level to gently sloping stable uplands, vegetated by cottongrass, ground shrubs, and wildflowers.

From late June to early August, Herschel Island witnesses an explosion of colour. Its humid maritime climate during the growing season fosters a lush growth of tundra flowers, including vetches, louseworts, Arctic lupines, arnicas, and forget-me-nots.

== UNESCO site ==
Qikiqtaruk Territorial Park, together with Ivvavik National Park and Vuntut National Park (both on the Yukon mainland), is a leading contender to become Canada's next World Heritage Site. The region is on Canada's tentative list for a UNESCO nomination in both the cultural and natural categories.

== Climate change threats ==
In 2007 the UNESCO World Heritage Centre published a report called Case Studies on Climate Change and World Heritage. The report states that a decrease in sea ice, and consequent increase in coastal erosion, poses a serious threat to Herschel Island's historic resources. The World Monuments Fund has placed Herschel Island on its 100 Most Endangered Sites, 2008 watch list, citing "rising sea levels, eroding coastline and melting permafrost" as imminent threats. Coastal erosion is up to 3 m (9.8 ft) per year in parts of the island's coastline. There are several active slumps or retrogressive thaw slumps of considerable size along the south-eastern shore of the island and they have increased in abundance and size over the last fifty years. In summer 2024 alone, over 700 coastal landslides slumped parts of the island into the ocean.

== See also ==
- List of islands of Canada
- Geography of Yukon
