= Qikiqtaruk Territorial Park =

Territorial park of Yukon, Canada

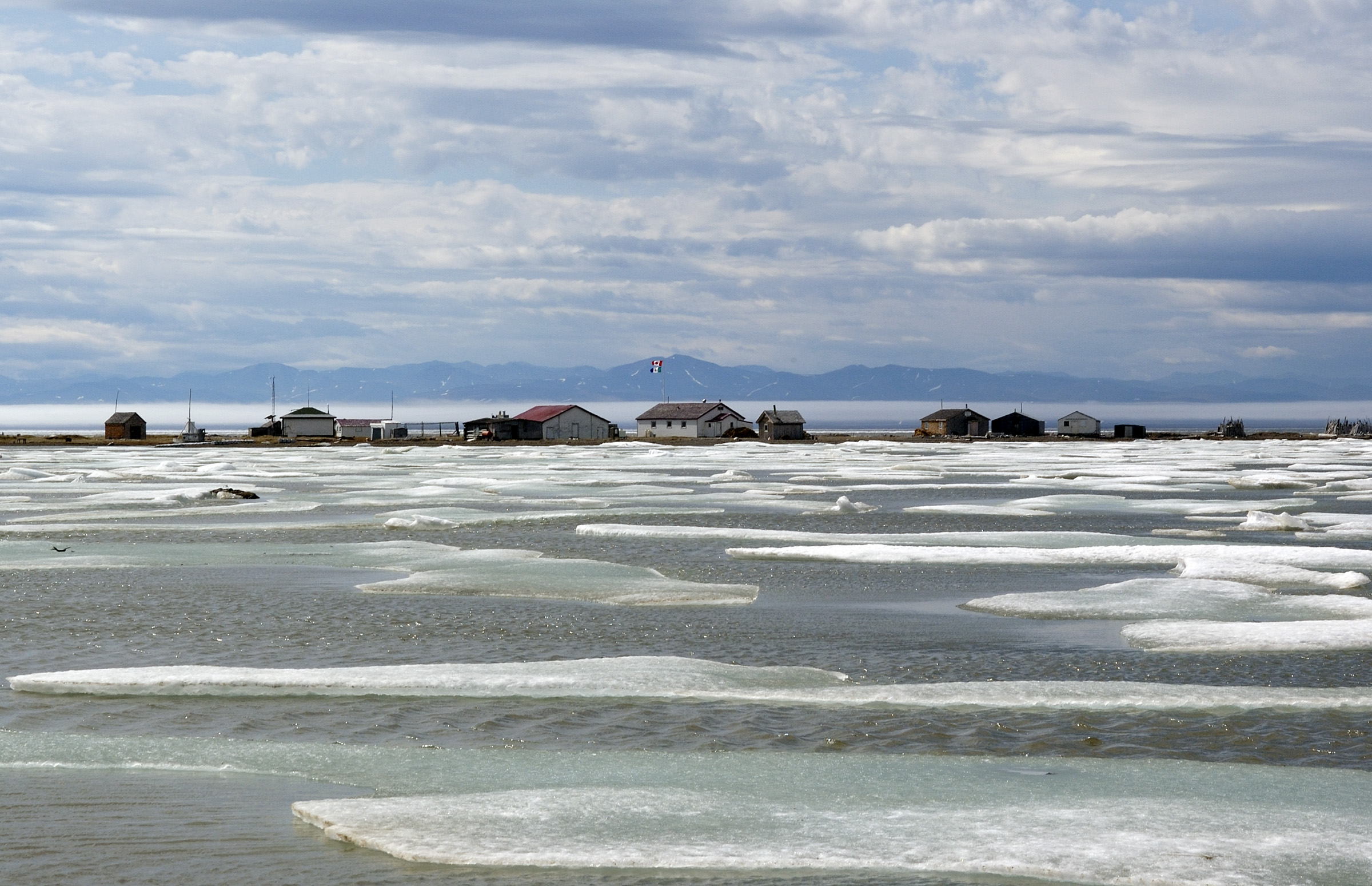
- Pauline Cove, Herschel Island, Yukon

- Location within Yukon Location within Canada
- Interactive map of Qikiqtaruk Territorial Park
- Location: Yukon, Canada
- Nearest city: Inuvik, Northwest Territories
- Coordinates: 69°35′23″N 139°05′57″W
- Area: 116 km^{2} (45 sq mi)
- Established: 1987
- Governing body: Government of Yukon

Qikiqtaruk Territorial Park ('our island' in Inuvialuktun), is the first territorial park in the territory of Yukon, Canada. The park makes up the entire 116 km^{2} (45 sq mi) of Herschel Island. The island is located 5 km (3.1 mi) north of the Yukon coast in the Beaufort Sea (Inuvialuktun: Tariuq). The park is known for its large colony of black guillemots (Inuvialuktun: inagiq).

The park was established in 1987 as a result of the Inuvialuit Final Agreement and is part of the Inuvialuit Settlement Region which spans the Northwest Territories and Yukon. The area is an important site for traditional Inuvialuit (Inuit) activities and is reachable by plane from Inuvik or by boat.
