= Ni'iinlii'njik (Fishing Branch) Territorial Park =

Territorial park in the Yukon Territory, Canada

- Location within Canada
- Location: Yukon, Canada
- Coordinates: 66°24′38″N 139°21′36″W
- Area: 6,708 km^{2} (2,590 sq mi)
- Established: 1999

Ni'iinlii'njik (Fishing Branch) Territorial Park is a territorial park located in Yukon, Canada.

== See also ==
- List of Yukon parks
