= Coal River Springs Territorial Park =

Territorial park and ecological reserve in Yukon

- IUCN category III (natural monument or feature)
- Interactive map of Coal River Springs Territorial Park
- Nearest town: Watson Lake
- Coordinates: 60°03′00″N 127°25′00″W
- Area: approx. 16.0 km² (15.7 km²)
- Established: 1990
- Governing body: Territorial

Coal River Springs Territorial Park is a territorial park and ecological reserve situated in the Canadian territory of Yukon, 65 km east (Note: Official websites say Watson Lake is 80 km west of the park, while The Canadian Encyclopedia states the park is 65 km east of Watson Lake.) from Watson Lake, close to the Yukon-British Columbia boundary. The park is named for the Coal River, on which it sits.

== Access ==
Protecting the reserve itself, and especially its environmentally delicate limestone terraces, carved out by cold water springs, is the principal goal of the park, making entrance to the park expensive and limited. Another reason for restricted access is the challenge of reaching the park on-foot. Off-trail hiking from the unpaved mining roads is dangerous, and crossing the river is impossible all-year long. Access to the area is mainly granted by floatplane, canoeing through rapids for many days and by helicopter from Watson Lake, given a permit is provided.

== Recreation and activities ==
Basic facilities and various activities are available once visitors are able to enter the reserve grounds.

== Flora and fauna ==
Wildlife habitats in the park are comparatively undisturbed by human activities. As such, hard to find flowers thrive here, along with bears, moose and rare birds and butterflies.
