= Yukon Beringia Interpretive Centre =

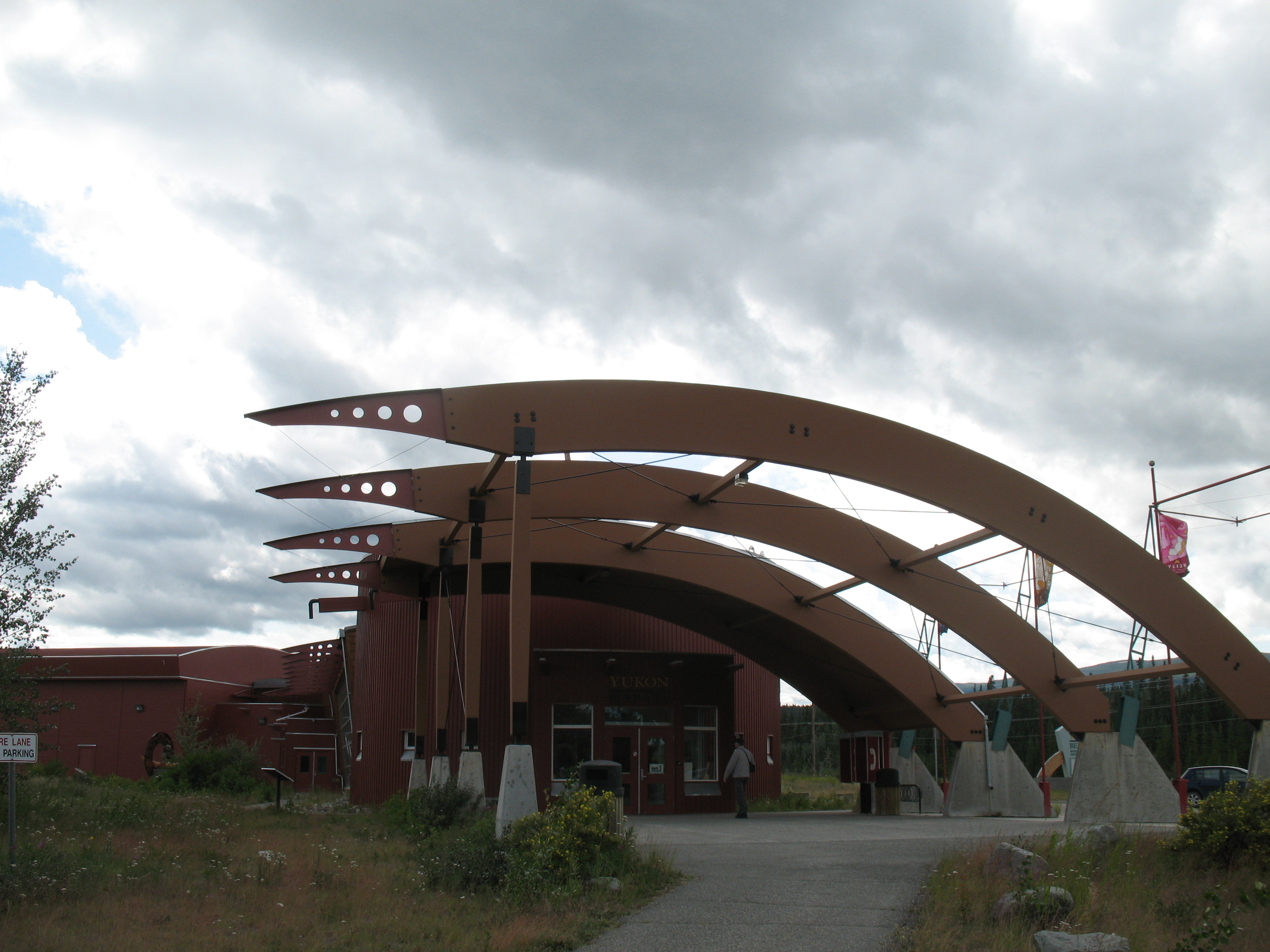
- Entrance to the Yukon Beringia Interpretive Centre
- Location: Alaska Highway, Whitehorse, Yukon, Canada
- Coordinates: 60°42′31″N 135°04′44″W
- Type: Human and natural history museum
- Architect: Masnasc Isaac
- Owner: Government of Yukon
- Website: www.beringia.com

The Yukon Beringia Interpretive Centre is a research and exhibition facility located at km 1423 (Mile 886) on the Alaska Highway in Whitehorse, Yukon, which opened in 1997. The focus of the interpretive centre is the story of Beringia, the 3200 km landmass stretching from the Kolyma River in Siberia to the Mackenzie River in Canada, which remained non-glaciated during the Pleistocene due to light snowfall from an arid climate. Beringia is of special interest to archeologists and paleontologists as it played a crucial role in the migrations of many animals and humans between Asia and the Americas. The term Beringia was first coined by the Swedish botanist Eric Hultén in 1937.

During Beringia's long history some animals migrated Easterly (mastodons, gomphotheres, mammoths, various members of the deer family, bison, sheep and muskoxen) others Westerly (equines, camels), and yet others reveal many episodes of dispersal (such as lemmings and voles).

== Research ==
Recent research includes the paleobotany around the Bluefish Caves, habitat of ground squirrels (Spermophilus parryii) and their middens, Klondike gold fields, and the Old Crow region which revealed many fossils belonging to mammals that are much rarer in Pleistocene fossil assemblages, including giant beaver (Castoroides ohioensis), broad-fronted moose (Cervalces latifrons), western camel (Camelops hesternus), American mastodon (Mammut americanum), scimitar cat (Homotherium serum), and short-faced bear (Arctodus simus). Radiocarbon dating is ongoing for many of these specimens.

There are also whitefish fossils, approximately 2-million-year-old specimens of Coregonus beringiaensis (a giant beaver), from Ch'ijee's Bluff in the Bluefish Basin on the Porcupine River near Old Crow.

== Authority ==
The mandate for the Yukon Beringia Interpretive Centre's activities derives from the Department of Tourism and Culture of the Yukon Territorial Government.

== Affiliations ==
The Yukon Beringia Interpretive Centre is affiliated with the Alliance of Natural Museums of Natural History of Canada and the Virtual Museum of Canada.
