= Interpretation centre =

Type of museum

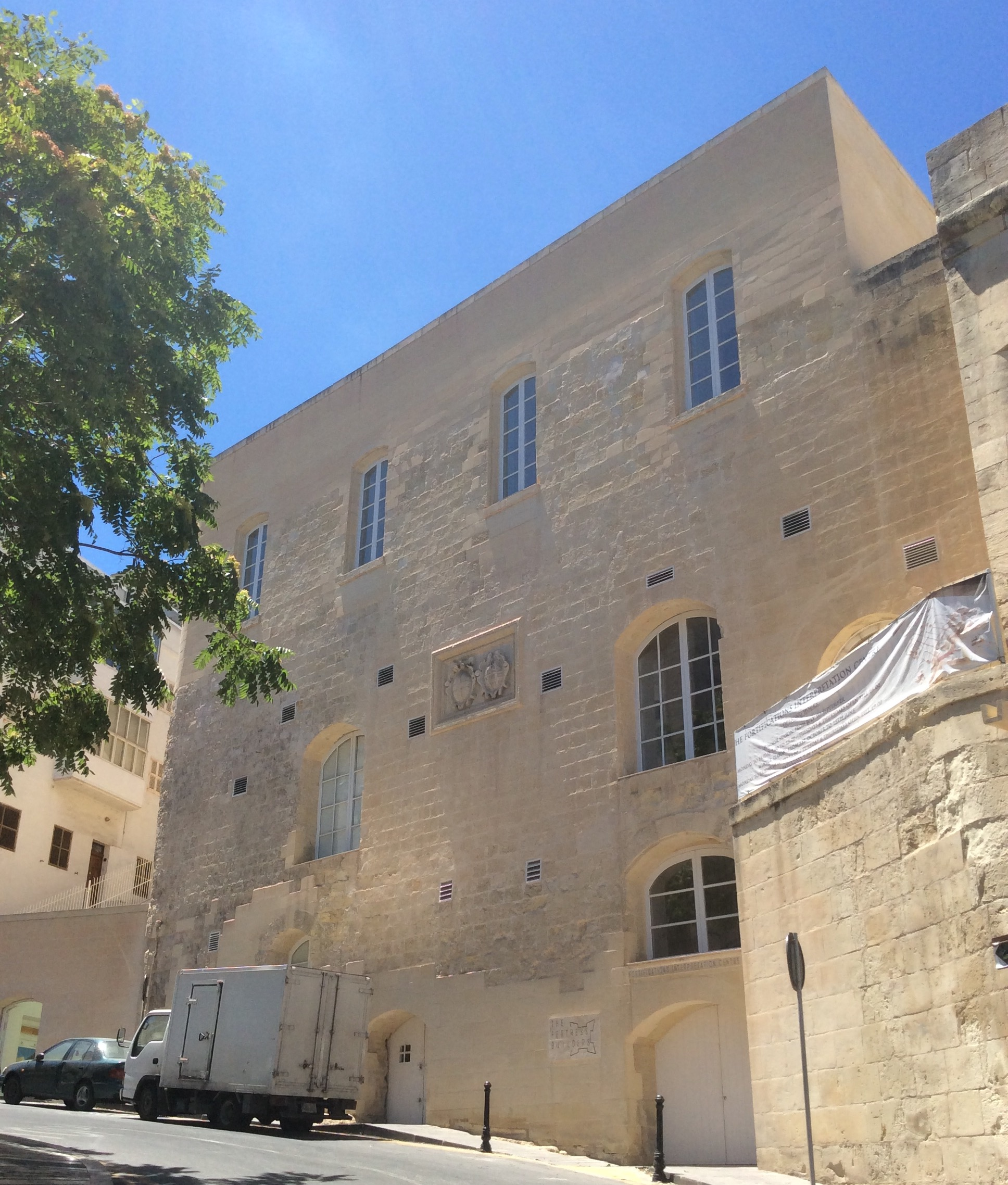
The Fortifications Interpretation Centre in Valletta, Malta

An interpretation centre, interpretive centre, or visitor interpretive centre is an institution for dissemination of knowledge of natural or cultural heritage. Interpretation centres are a kind of new-style museum, often associated with visitor centres or ecomuseums, and located in connection with cultural, historic or natural sites.

Interpretation centres use different means of communication to enhance the understanding of heritage. To aid and stimulate the discovery process and the visitor's intellectual and emotional connection to heritage, the main presentation strategy tends to be user-friendly and interactive, and often uses scenographic exhibitions and multimedia programs. Many interpretation centres have temporary exhibitions related to a specific aspect of the site.

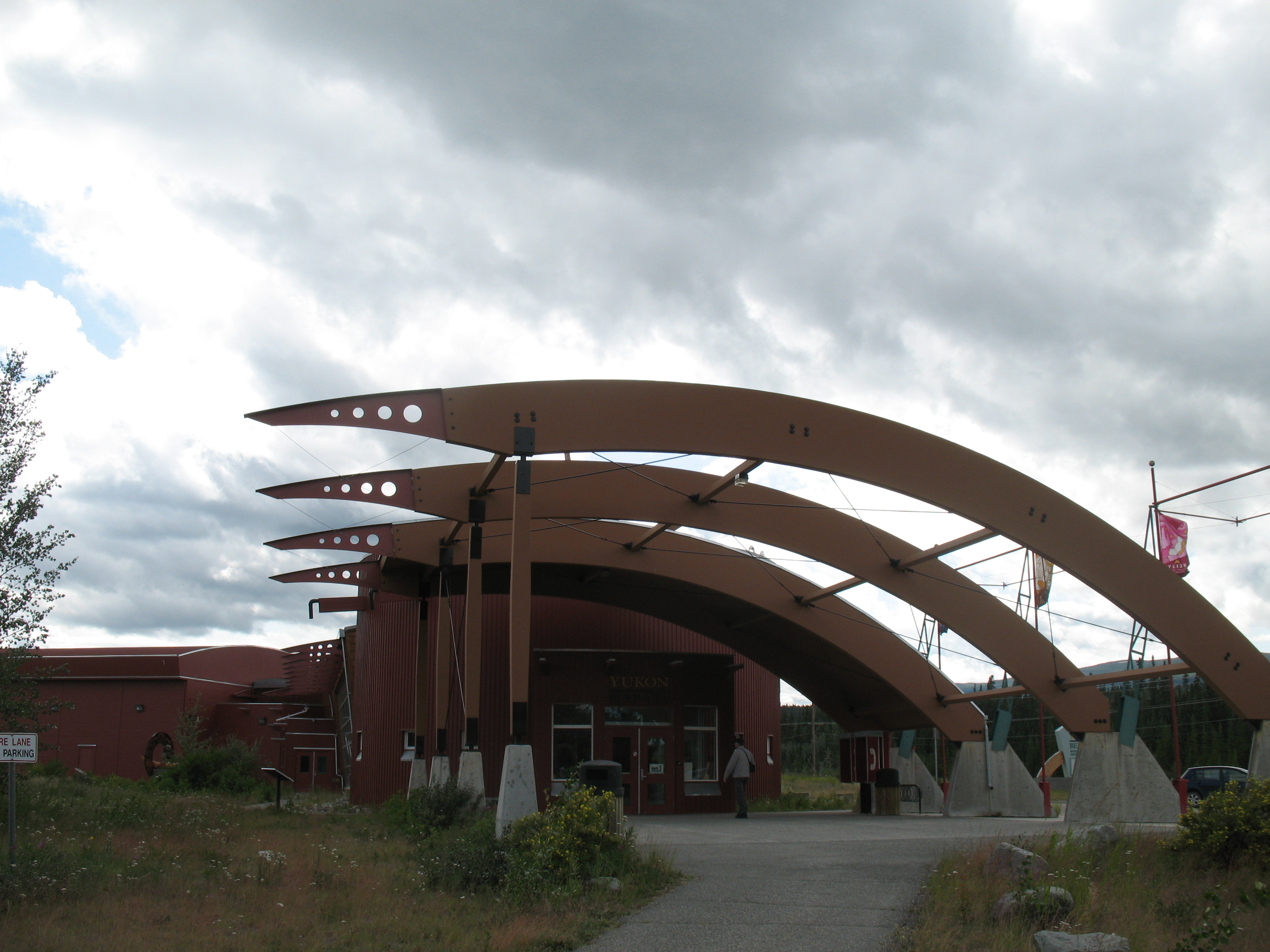
Yukon Beringia Interpretive Centre

An interpretation centre can be a viable solution for effective communication of heritage information in municipalities and rural areas where resources may not exist to establish a traditional, full-scale museum, and where heritage can be an important factor for tourism development.

Unlike traditional museums, interpretation centres do not usually aim to collect, conserve and study items; they are specialized institutions for communicating the significance and meaning of heritage. They work to educate and raise awareness of the site's importance. Non-core jobs as conservation and research are services usually done by specialized, external entities.

== See also ==
- Nature centre
- Heritage interpretation
- Science centre
- Interpretive planning
