= Yukon =

Territory of Canada

Yukon Ųųg Han (Gwichʼin) Chu Nìikwän (Southern Tutchone)
- Territory
- Flag Coat of arms

- Coordinates: 63°N 135°W
- Country: Canada
- Before confederation: District of Yukon
- Confederation: June 13, 1898 (9th)
- Capital (and largest city): Whitehorse
- Largest metro: Whitehorse

Government
  - Type: Parliamentary system
  - Commissioner: Adeline Webber
  - Premier: Currie Dixon
- Legislature: Yukon Legislative Assembly
- Federal representation: Parliament of Canada
- House seats: 1 of 343 (0.3%)
- Senate seats: 1 of 105 (1%)

Area (2016 / 2021 (Note: Land area is from the 2021 census and the water area is from 2016))
  - Total: 480,397.44 km^{2} (185,482.49 sq mi)
  - Land: 472,345.44 km^{2} (182,373.59 sq mi)
  - Water: 8,052 km^{2} (3,109 sq mi) 1.7%
  - Rank: 9th
- 4.8% of Canada

Population (2021)
  - Total: 40,232
  - Estimate (Q3 2026): 50,356
  - Rank: 12th
  - Density: 0.09/km^{2} (0.23/sq mi)
- Demonyms: Yukoner; French: Yukonnais(e)
- Official languages: English; French

GDP
  - Rank: 13th
  - Total (2024): C$4.349 billion
  - Per capita: C$91,375 (4th)

HDI
  - HDI (2023): 0.933—Very high (5th)
- Time zone: UTC−07:00 (Pacific Daylight Time, officially called Yukon Standard Time)
- Canadian postal abbr.: YT
- Postal code prefix: Y
- ISO 3166 code: CA-YT
- Flower: Fireweed
- Tree: Subalpine fir
- Bird: Common raven
- Website: yukon.ca
- Rankings include all provinces and territories

Yukon (/jukɒn/, Canadian French: [jukõ]) is a territory of Canada, bordering British Columbia to the south, the Northwest Territories to the east, the Beaufort Sea to the north, and the U.S. state of Alaska to the west. It is Canada's westernmost and smallest territory by land area. As of the 2026 third quarter estimates Yukon had a population of 50,356, the most of the territories. Whitehorse, the territorial capital, is the largest city in northern Canada.

Yukon was split from the Northwest Territories by a federal statute in 1898 as the Yukon Territory. The current governing legislation is the Yukon Act passed by the federal Parliament in 2002. That act established Yukon as the territory's official name, although Yukon Territory remains in popular usage. Canada Post uses the territory's internationally approved postal abbreviation of YT. In 2021, territorial government policy was changed so that The Yukon is recommended for use in official territorial government materials.

Although officially bilingual (English and French), the Yukon government recognizes First Nations languages.

At 5,959 metres (19,551 feet), Yukon's Mount Logan, in Kluane National Park and Reserve, is the highest mountain in Canada and the second-highest on the North American continent (after Denali in the U.S. state of Alaska). Most of the Yukon has a subarctic climate, characterized by long, cold winters and brief, warm summers. The coastal area along the Arctic Ocean has a tundra climate.

Notable rivers include the Yukon, Pelly, Stewart, Peel, White, Liard, and Tatshenshini.

== Etymology ==
The territory is named after the Yukon River, the longest river in the Yukon. The name itself is from a contraction of the words in the Gwich'in phrase chųų gąįį han, which means "white water river" and refers to "the pale colour" of glacial runoff in the Yukon River.

Historically, the name of the Yukon Territory has been abbreviated to "The Yukon" in informal speech. In 2003, the territorial government announced that the territory should be referred to as "Yukon", but the change in name sparked discussion amongst Yukoners. In the 2021 election, the leader of the Yukon NDP, Kate White, campaigned on returning to using "The Yukon". Following the election, the Yukon Liberal Party government announced that "The Yukon" would again be used by the government.

== Geography ==
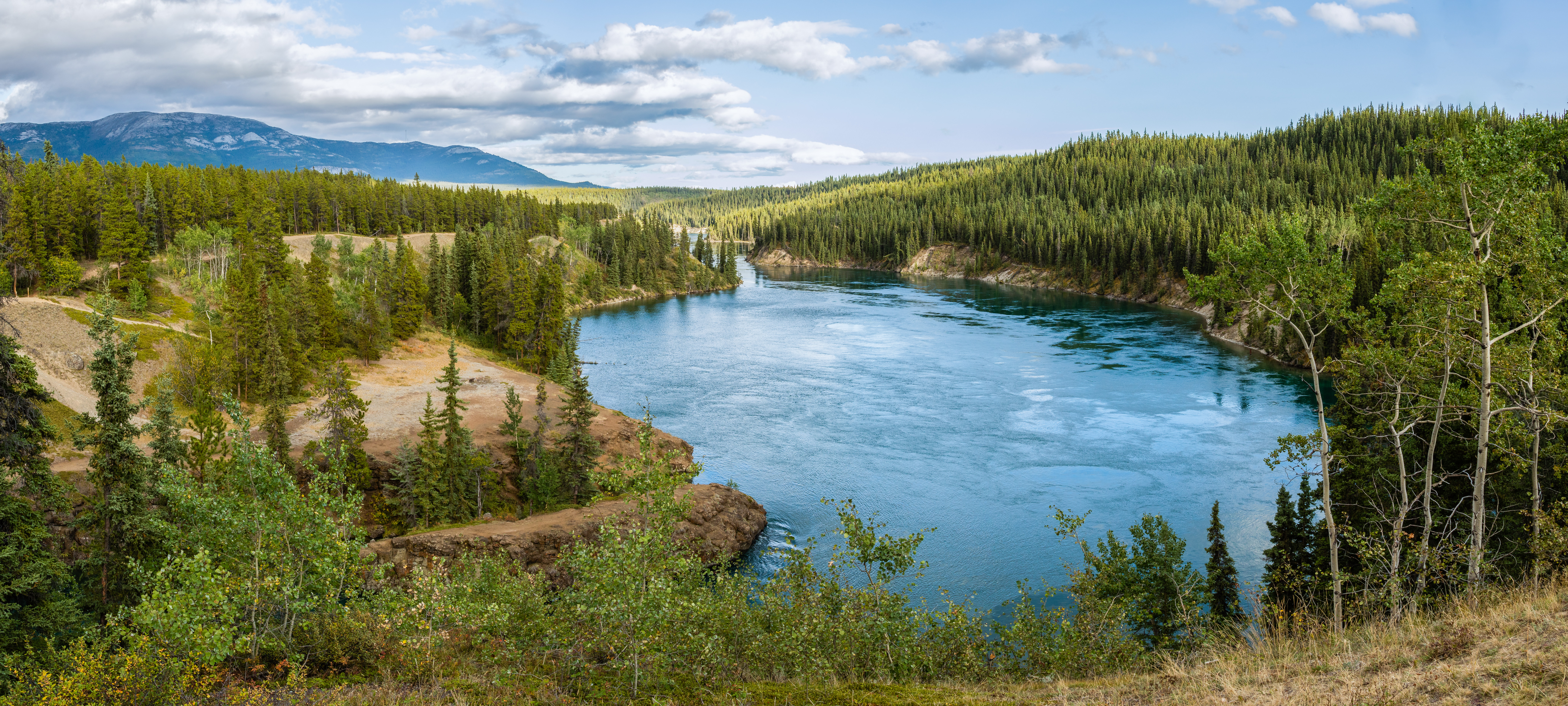
The Yukon River at Schwatka Lake and the entry to Miles Canyon

The territory is the approximate shape of a right triangle, bordering the U.S. state of Alaska to the west and northwest for 1,210 kilometres (750 mi) mostly along longitude 141° W, the Northwest Territories to the east and British Columbia to the south mostly along latitude 60° N. Its northern coast is on the Beaufort Sea. Its ragged eastern boundary mostly follows the divide between the Yukon Basin and the Mackenzie River drainage basin to the east in the Mackenzie mountains.

Most of the territory is in the watershed of its namesake, the Yukon River, which flows across the territory in a northwesterly direction. The southern Yukon is dotted with a large number of large, long and narrow glacier-fed alpine lakes, most of which flow into the Yukon River system. The larger lakes include Teslin Lake, Atlin Lake, Tagish Lake, Marsh Lake, Lake Laberge, Kusawa Lake and Kluane Lake. Bennett Lake on the Klondike Gold Rush trail is a lake flowing into Nares Lake, with the greater part of its area within Yukon. Other watersheds in the territory include the Mackenzie River, the Peel Watershed and the Alsek–Tatshenshini, and a number of rivers flowing directly into the Beaufort Sea. The two main Yukon rivers flowing into the Mackenzie in the Northwest Territories are the Liard River in the southeast and the Peel River and its tributaries in the northeast.

Canada's highest point, Mount Logan (5,959 metres or 19,551 feet), is in the territory's southwest. Mount Logan and a large part of the Yukon's southwest are in Kluane National Park and Reserve, a UNESCO World Heritage Site. Other national parks include Ivvavik National Park and Vuntut National Park in the north. A second UNESCO World Heritage Site, Tr'ondëk-Klondike World Heritage Site, was designated in 2023.

Notable widespread tree species within the Yukon are the black spruce and white spruce. Many trees are stunted because of the short growing season and severe climate.

=== Climate ===
Köppen climate types in Yukon

While the average winter temperature in the Yukon is mild by Canadian arctic standards, no other place in North America grows as cold as the Yukon during extreme cold snaps. The temperature has dropped to −60 °C (−76 °F) three times, 1947, 1952, and 1968. The most extreme cold snap occurred in February 1947 when the abandoned town of Snag dropped to −63.0 °C (−81.4 °F).

Unlike most of Canada where the most extreme heat waves occur in July, August, and even September, the Yukon's extreme heat tends to occur in June and even May. The Yukon has recorded 36 °C (97 °F) three times. The first time was in June 1969 when Mayo recorded a temperature of 36.1 °C (97 °F). 14 years later this record was almost beaten when Forty Mile recorded 36 °C (97 °F) in May 1983. The old record was finally broken 21 years later in June 2004 when the Mayo Road weather station, located just northwest of Whitehorse, recorded a temperature of 36.5 °C (97.7 °F).

Average daily maximum and minimum temperatures for selected locations in Yukon
City	July average high	July average low	January average high	January average low
Whitehorse	21 °C (70 °F)	8 °C (46 °F)	−11 °C (12 °F)	−19 °C (−2 °F)
Dawson City	23 °C (73 °F)	8 °C (46 °F)	−22 °C (−8 °F)	−30 °C (−22 °F)
Old Crow	20 °C (68 °F)	9 °C (48 °F)	−25 °C (−13 °F)	−34 °C (−29 °F)

== History ==
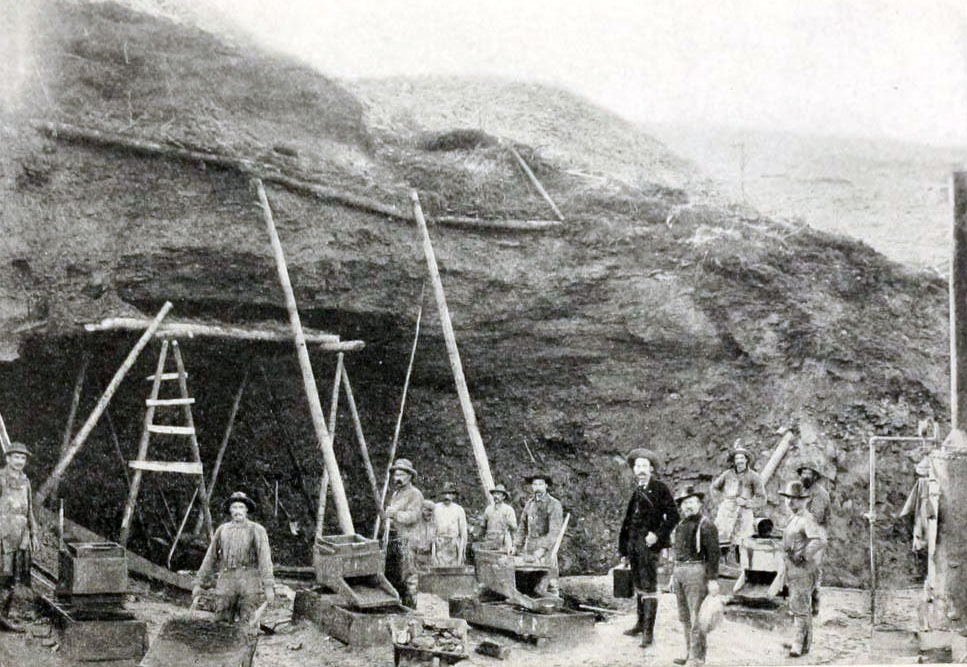
Hill-side mining during the Klondike Gold Rush, c. 1899

Long before the arrival of Europeans, the central and southern Yukon was populated by First Nations people, and the area escaped glaciation. Sites of archeological significance in the Yukon hold some of the earliest evidence of the presence of human habitation in North America. The sites safeguard the history of the first people and the earliest First Nations of the Yukon.

The volcanic eruption of Mount Churchill in approximately 800 AD in what is now the U.S. state of Alaska blanketed the southern Yukon with a layer of ash which can still be seen along the Klondike Highway, and which forms part of the oral tradition of First Nations peoples in the Yukon and further south in Canada.

Coastal and inland First Nations had extensive trading networks. European incursions into the area began early in the 19th century with the fur trade, followed by missionaries. By the 1870s and 1880s, gold miners began to arrive. This drove a population increase that justified the establishment of a police force, just in time for the start of the Klondike Gold Rush in 1897. The increased population coming with the gold rush led to the separation of the Yukon district from the Northwest Territories and the formation of the separate Yukon Territory in 1898.

== Demographics ==
The 2021 census reported a Yukon population of 40,232. With a land area of 472,345.44 km^{2} (182,373.59 sq mi), it had a population density of 0.09/km^{2} (0.22/sq mi) in 2021, the highest among Canada's three territories. Statistics Canada has estimated Yukon's 2024 population to be 46,948, an increase of 17.5% from the 2016 census. This is the largest percentage increase for any Canadian province or territory.

Unlike in other Canadian provinces and territories, Statistics Canada uses the entire territory as a single at-large census division.

=== Ethnicity ===
According to the 2021 Canadian census the majority of the territory's population was of European descent, although it has a significant population of First Nations communities across the territory. The 2021 census examined the Yukon's ethnocultural diversity and immigration. At that time, 83.2% of residents were Canadian-born and 22.3% were of Indigenous origin. The most common countries of birth for immigrants were the Philippines (26.1%), the United States (9.8%), and the United Kingdom (9.7%). Among very recent immigrants (between 2016 and 2021) living in the Yukon, 56% were born in Asia.

As of the 2021 census, the top ten ancestries in the Yukon were:

Rank	Ethnic group	Population (2021)	Percentage
1	English	9,105	23.0
2	Indigenous	8,810	22.3
3	Scottish	8,375	21.2
4	Irish	7,440	18.8
5	German	5,325	13.5
6	Canadian	4,680	11.8
7	French (Note: This refers to people of the Francophone world that have not been included elsewhere. French Canadians, of which there are 600 people, make up 1.5% of the population.)	4,245	11.8
8	Ukrainian	1,975	5.0
9	Dutch	1,825	4.6
10	Filipino	1,490	4.5

=== Language ===
The most commonly reported mother tongue among the 39,840 single responses to the 2021 Canadian census was English at 31,995 (80%). The second-most common was 1,455 (4%) for French. Among the 1,355 multiple respondents, 440 of them (32%) reported a mother tongue of both English and French, while 785 (58%) reported English and a "non-official language" and 15 (1%) reported French and a "non-official language".

The Yukon's Language Act "recognizes the significance" of the territory's aboriginal languages in the Yukon, and permits their use in Legislative Assembly proceedings, although only English and French are available for laws and court proceedings.

First Nations linguistic groups by tribes/clans
Linguistic group	Tribe/clan
Gwich'in	Vuntut Gwitchin First Nation, Old Crow
Hän	Tr'ondëk Hwëch'in First Nation, Dawson City
Upper Tanana	White River First Nation, Beaver Creek: Small communities near Tok (Alaska)
Northern Tutchone	Selkirk First Nation: Little Salmon/Carmacks First Nation; First Nation of Na-Cho Nyäk Dun, Mayo
Southern Tutchone	Champagne and Aishihik First Nations, Haines Junction: Kluane First Nation, Burwash Landing; Ta'an Kwach'an Council, Lake Laberge; Kwanlin Dün First Nation, Whitehorse
Kaska	Ross River Dena Council, Ross River: Liard River First Nation, Watson Lake
Inland Tlingit	Teslin Tlingit Council
Tagish	Carcross/Tagish First Nation

Mother tongue, 2021 census
Rank	Language	Population	Percent
1.	English	31,995	80.31%
2.	French	1,785	4.48%
3.	Tagalog	985	2.47%
4.	German	600	1.51%
5.	Punjabi	410	1.03%
6.	Spanish	235	0.59%
7.	Cantonese (Yue)	200	0.50%
8.	Japanese	135	0.34%
9.	Mandarin	130	0.33%
10.	Tuchone Languages	115	0.29%

=== Religion ===
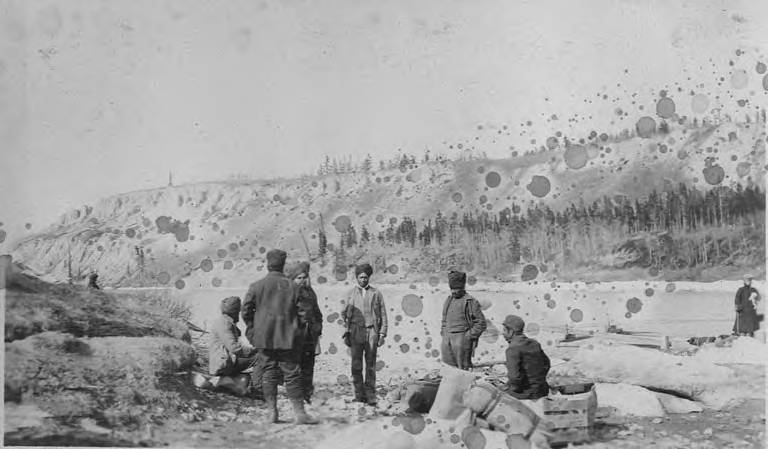
Sikhs in Whitehorse, Yukon in April 1906

The 2021 Canadian census reported that 59.7% of Yukoners reported having no religious affiliation, the highest percentage in Canada. The most frequently reported religious affiliation was Christianity, reported by 35.0% of residents, followed by Sikhism at 1.0%.

Religious beliefs in Yukon (2021 census)
Religion	Adherents	% of the population
No religion and secular perspectives	23,640	59.71%
Christian	13,860	35.01%
Sikh	380	0.96%
Traditional (North American Indigenous) spirituality	325	0.82%
Hindu	265	0.67%
Buddhist	260	0.66%
Muslim	185	0.47%
Jewish	70	0.18%
Other religions and spiritual traditions	600	1.52%
Total	39,590	100%

== Economy ==
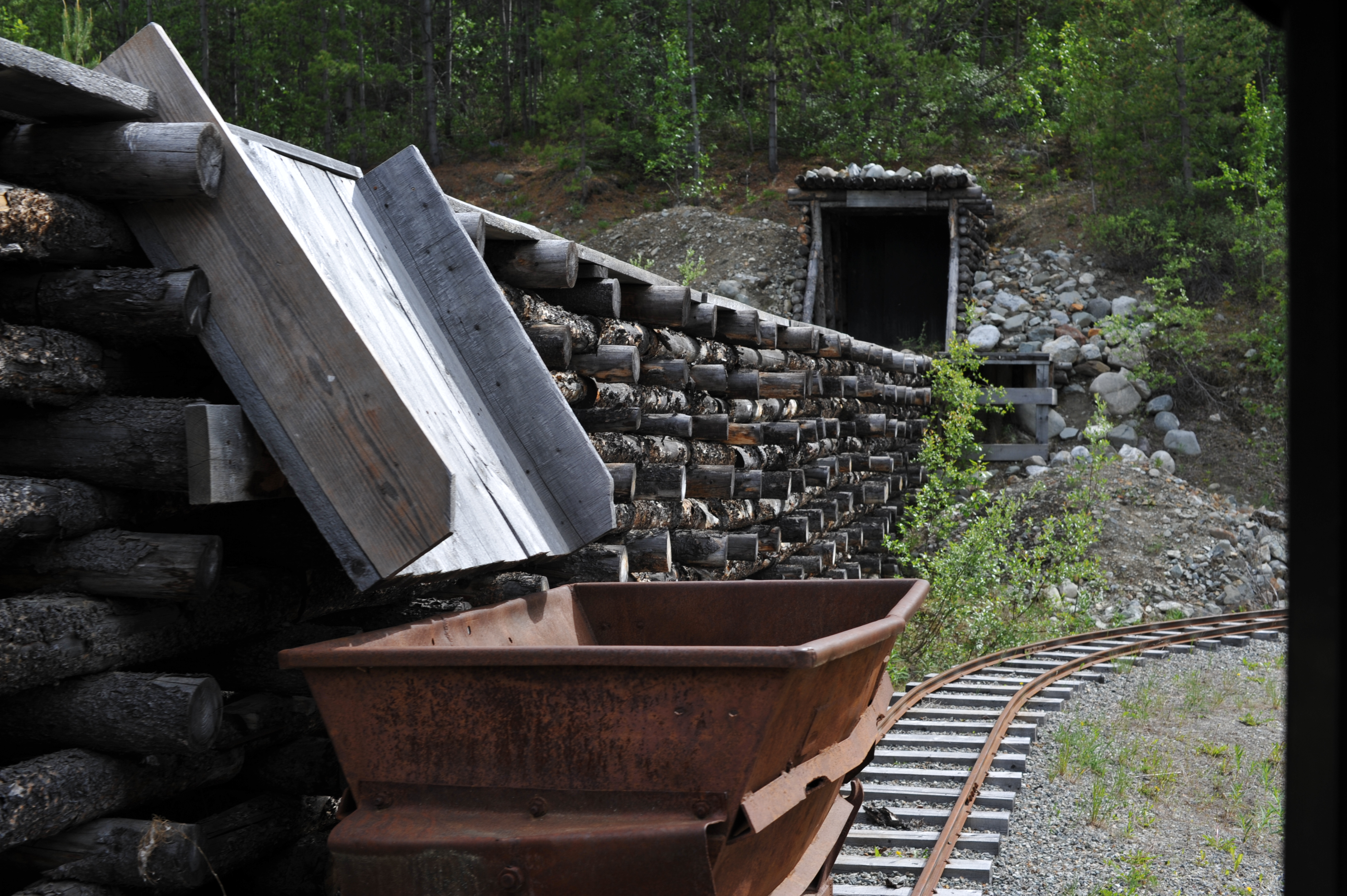
A conveyor belt and cart outside of a mine tunnel in the Yukon. The economy of the territory has historically been centred around mining.

The Yukon's major industry is mining (lead, zinc, silver, gold, asbestos and copper). The federal government acquired the land from the Hudson's Bay Company in 1870 and split it from the Northwest Territories in 1898 to fill the need for local government created by the population influx of the gold rush. Thousands of these prospectors moved to the territory, ushering a period of Yukon history recorded by authors such as Robert W. Service and Jack London. The memory of this period and the early days of the Royal Canadian Mounted Police, as well as the territory's scenic wonders and outdoor recreation opportunities, makes tourism the second most important industry in the territory.

Manufacturing, including furniture, clothing, and handicrafts, follows in importance, along with hydroelectricity. The traditional industries of trapping and fishing have declined. As of 2012, the government sector directly employs approximately 6,300 out of a labour force of 20,800, on a population of 27,500.

On May 1, 2015, the Yukon modified its Business Corporations Act, in an effort to attract more benefits and participants to its economy. One amendment to the BCA lets a proxy be given for voting purposes. Another change will allow directors to pursue business opportunities declined by the corporation, a practice off-limits in most other jurisdictions due to the inherent potential for conflicts of interest. One of the changes will allow a corporation to serve as a director of a subsidiary registered in Yukon. The legislation also allows companies to add provisions in their articles of incorporation giving directors blanket approval to sell off all of the company's assets without requiring a shareholder vote. If provided for by a unanimous shareholders agreement, a corporation is not required to have directors at all. There is increased flexibility regarding the location of corporate records offices, including the ability to maintain a records office outside of the Yukon so long as it is accessible by electronic means.

=== Tourism ===
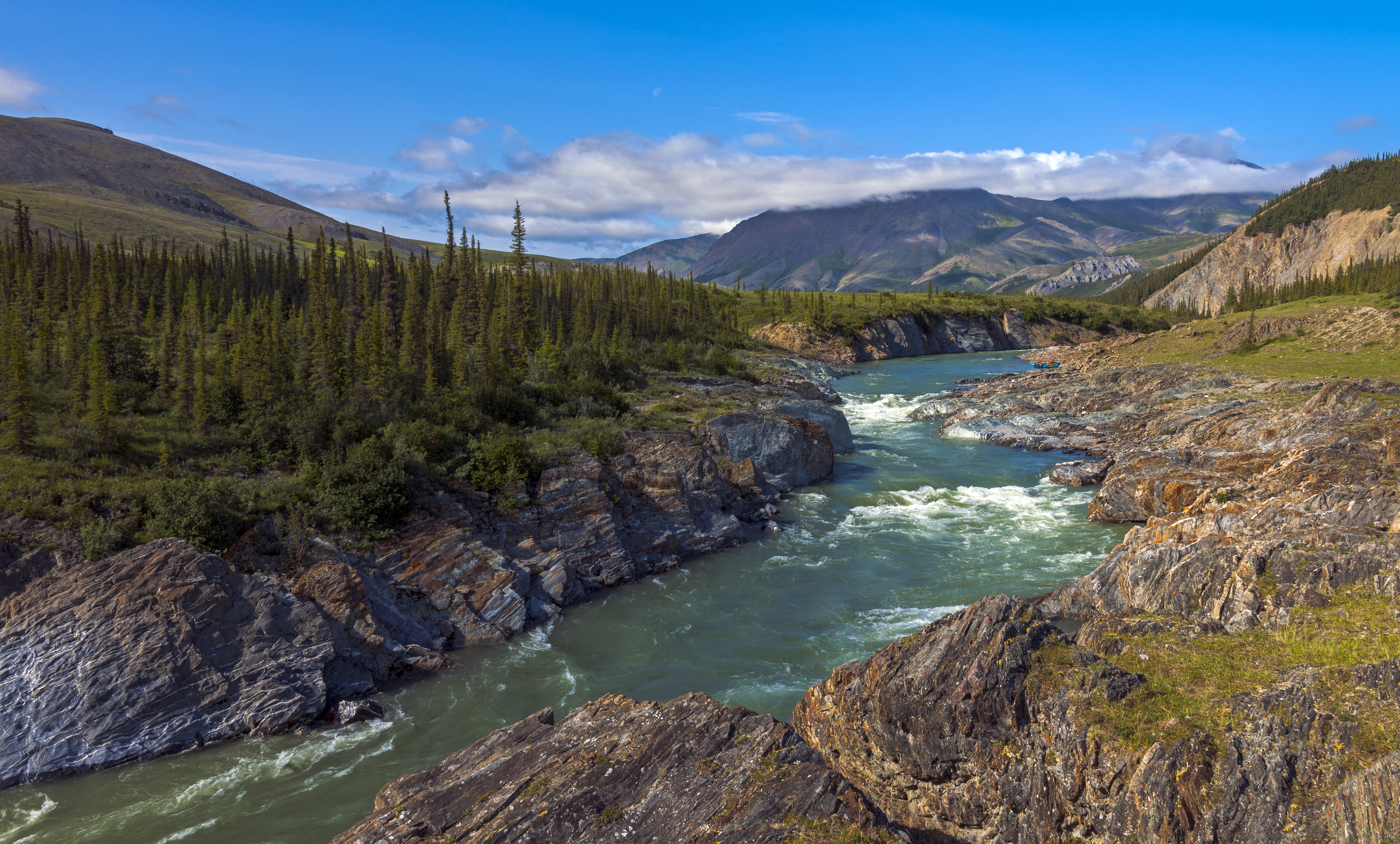
Ivvavik National Park is one of three national parks located in Yukon.

Tourism revenue in the Yukon garnered over $560 million in 2024. The territory's tourism motto is "Larger than life". Its tourism industry relies heavily on natural environment, with many organized outfitters and guides available for activities such as hunting, angling, canoeing/kayaking, hiking, skiing, snowboarding, ice climbing, and dog sledding. These activities are offered both in an organized setting or in the backcountry, which is accessible by air or snowmobile. The Yukon's festivals and sporting events include the Adäka Cultural Festival, Yukon International Storytelling Festival, and the Yukon Sourdough Rendezvous. The Yukon's latitude enables the view of aurora borealis.

The Yukon Government maintains a series of territorial parks, including parks such as Herschel Island Qikiqtaruk Territorial Park, Tombstone Territorial Park, Fishing Branch Ni'iinlii'njik Park, and Coal River Springs Territorial Park. Parks Canada, a federal agency of the Government of Canada, also maintains three national parks and reserves within the territory: Kluane National Park and Reserve, Ivvavik National Park, and Vuntut National Park.

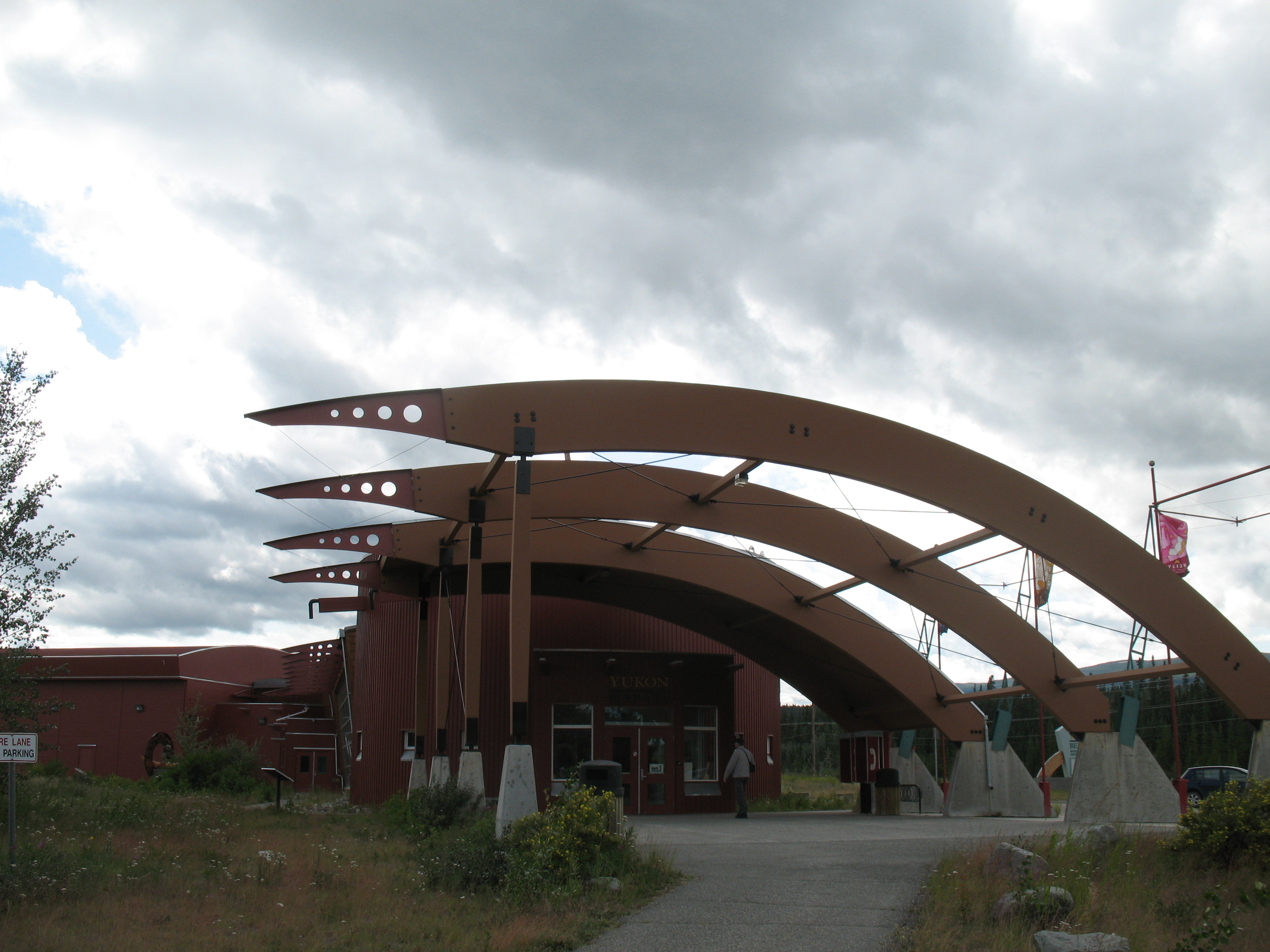
The Yukon Beringia Interpretive Centre is an interpretive centre with a focus on the Beringia land bridge.

The Yukon is also home to twelve National Historic Sites of Canada. The sites are also administered by Parks Canada, with five of the twelve sites being located within national parks. The territory is host to a number of museums, including the Copperbelt Railway & Mining Museum, the SS Klondike boat museum, the Yukon Beringia Interpretive Centre in Whitehorse; as well as the Keno City Mining Museum in Keno City. The territory also holds a number of enterprises that allows tourists to experience pre-colonial and modern cultures of Yukon's First Nations and Inuit.

== Culture ==
The Yukon has a wide array of cultural and sporting events that attract artists, local residents, and tourists. Annual events include the Adäka Cultural Festival, Dawson City Music Festival, Yukon International Storytelling Festival, Yukon Quest dog sled race, Yukon Sourdough Rendezvous, as well as Klondike Gold Rush memorials and the Northern Lights Centre.

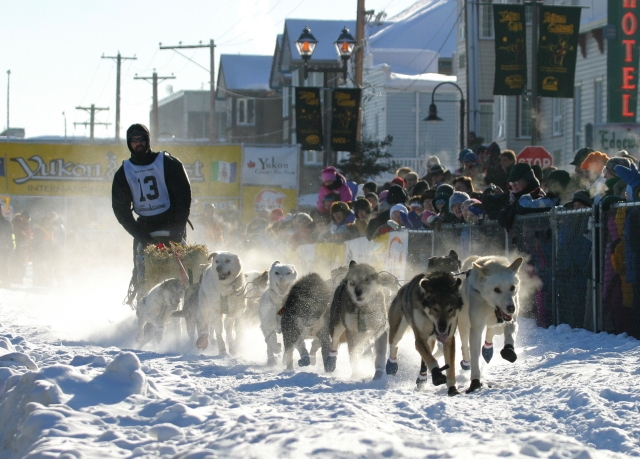
A musher during the start of the Yukon Quest dog sledding race in Whitehorse

The Yukon's Aboriginal culture is also strongly reflected in such areas as winter sports, as in the Yukon Quest sled dog race. The modern comic-book character Yukon Jack depicts a heroic aboriginal persona. Similarly, the territorial government also recognizes that First Nations and Inuit languages plays a part in cultural heritage of the territory; these languages include Tlingit, and the less common Tahltan, as well as seven Athapaskan languages, Upper Tanana, Gwich'in, Hän, Northern Tutchone, Southern Tutchone, Kaska, and Tagish, some of which are rare.

=== Arts ===
Notable Yukon artists include Jim Robb and Ted Harrison and Emma Barr whose paintings have become iconic for their depictions of rugged landscape, historic and contemporary life and culture in the Yukon.

With the Klondike Gold Rush, a number of folk songs from the Yukon became popular, including "Rush to the Klondike" (1897, written by W. T. Diefenbaker), "The Klondike Gold Rush", "I've Got the Klondike Fever" (1898), and "La Chanson du Klondyke".

A notable cultural and tourist feature is the legacy of the Klondike Gold Rush (1897–1899), which inspired contemporary writers of the time such as Jack London, Robert W. Service, and Jules Verne, and which continues to inspire films and games, such as Mae West's Klondike Annie and The Yukon Trail.

== Government ==
=== Yukon Legislature ===
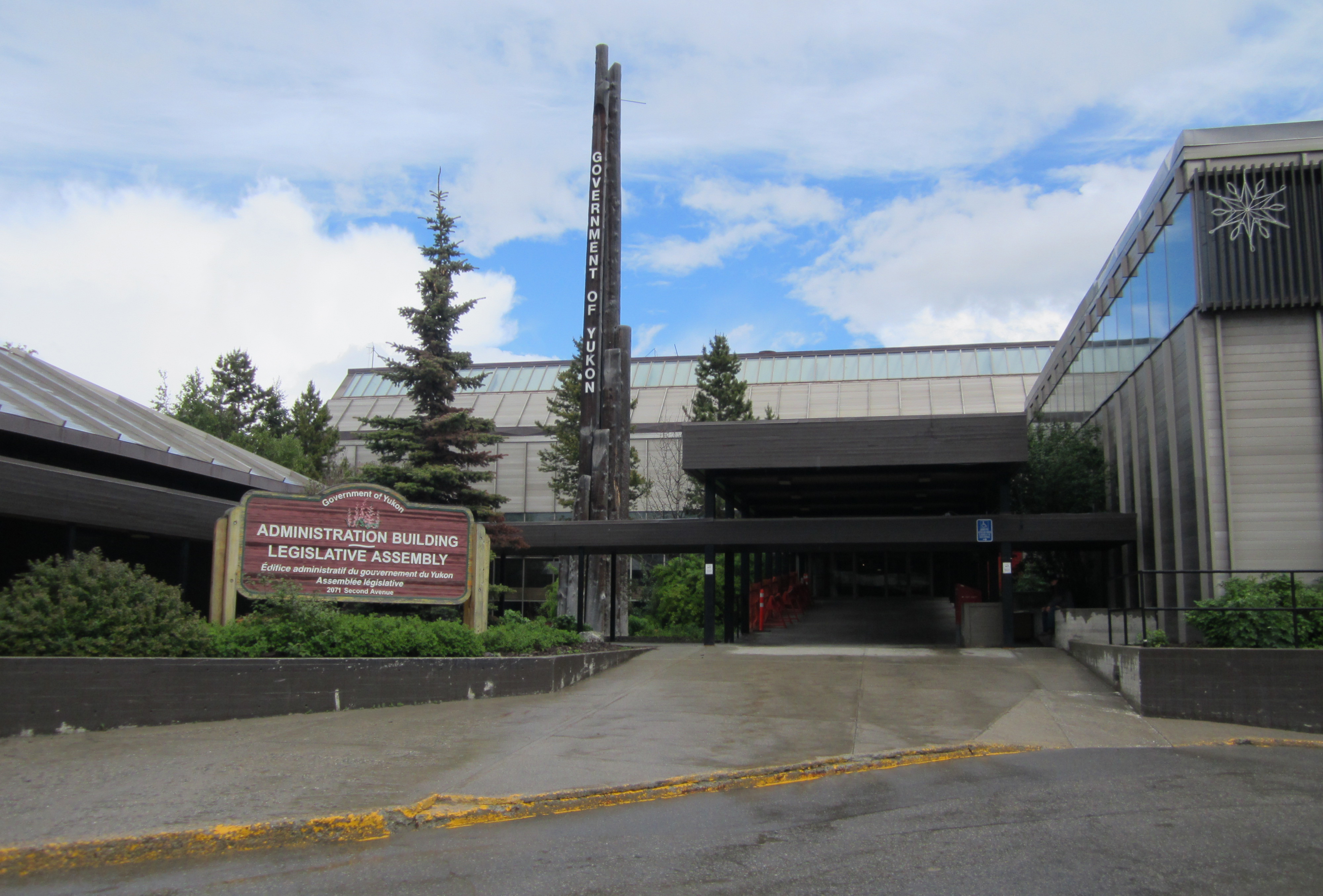
The Yukon Legislative Building is the meeting place for the territory's legislative assembly.

Executive power in the Yukon is formally vested in the Territorial Commissioner, who plays an analogous role to that of a provincial lieutenant governor. As guarantor of responsible government in the territory, the Commissioner generally acts on the advice of the Premier of Yukon, who commands the confidence of the elected Legislative Assembly. Unlike lieutenant governors, commissioners are not direct representatives of the King but are instead appointed by the federal government.

The Yukon has numerous political parties and candidates who stand for election to the 21 seats in the Yukon Legislative Assembly. Those elected to the legislature are known as members of the Legislative Assembly and may use the post-nominal letters "MLA". The three parties presently represented are the centre-right leaning Yukon Party (14 seats) – who currently form government, the centre-left leaning Yukon New Democratic Party (6), and the centre-leaning Yukon Liberal Party (1).

The 12th and current premier of Yukon is Currie Dixon; he is the first premier born in the territory.

=== Local government ===
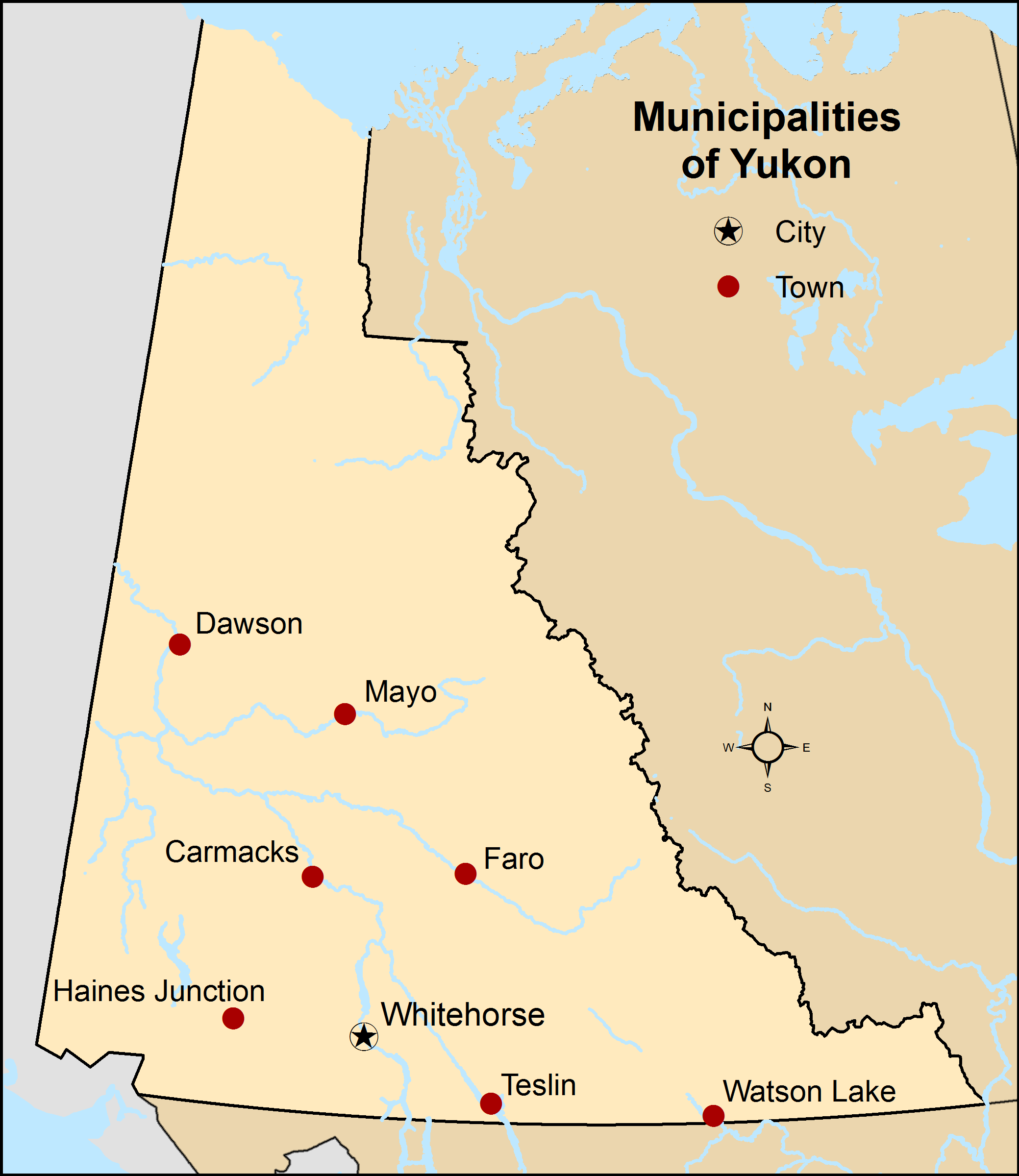
Distribution of Yukon's eight municipalities by type

The vast majority of the Yukon's land mass is unorganized, with no defined municipal or otherwise supralocal level of government like in other parts of Canada.

For most individuals in the Yukon, though, local level governance is provided by municipalities. The Yukon's eight municipalities cover only 0.2% of the territory's land mass (Note: The remaining 99.8% of Yukon's land mass contains two unincorporated hamlets, four unorganized areas, four Indian settlements, four self-governments (Indian reserves), thirteen unincorporated settlements and a Teslin land claim. Unorganized Yukon, one of the four unorganized areas, accounts for the vast majority of the territory's land mass, at 98.1%.) but are home to 80.9% of its population.

Municipal governments are created by the Yukon Government in accordance with the Municipal Act of 2001. Municipal governments provide "jurisdiction services, facilities, or things that a local government considers necessary or desirable for all or part of its community". Classifications of municipalities under the Municipal Act include cities and towns. Whitehorse is the capital of the Yukon and its only city. The remaining seven municipalities are towns, of which four were villages that were continued as towns upon adoption of the 2001 Municipal Act.

The usage is somewhat confusing: according to the Municipal Act of 2001 villages are legally given the status of towns, but may call themselves villages in English. In French they are called villages, and the French word ville, which means town, is not used for them. Instead larger settlements are called ville and even bigger ones grande ville, apart from Dawson which is called a cité, and in English is also called a city. Keno City, though unincorporated, also bears city in its name.

=== History ===
In the 19th century, the Yukon was a segment of North-Western Territory that was administered by the Hudson's Bay Company, and then of the Northwest Territories administered by the federal Canadian government. It only obtained a recognizable local government in 1895 when it became a separate district of the Northwest Territories. In 1898, it was made a separate territory with its own commissioner and an appointed Territorial Council.

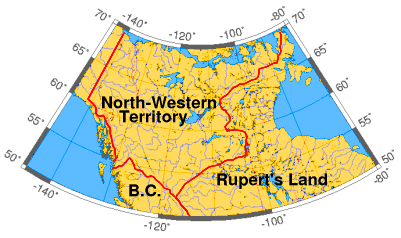
From the early 19th century to 1870, the areas that made up the Yukon were administered by the Hudson's Bay Company as the North-Western Territory.

Prior to 1979, the territory was administered by the commissioner who was appointed by the federal Minister of Indian Affairs and Northern Development. The commissioner had a role in appointing the territory's Executive Council, served as chair, and had a day-to-day role in governing the territory. The elected Territorial Council had a purely advisory role. In 1979, a significant degree of power was devolved from the commissioner and the federal government to the territorial legislature which, in that year, adopted a party system of responsible government. This change was accomplished through a letter from Jake Epp, Minister of Indian Affairs and Northern Development, rather than through formal legislation.

In preparation for responsible government, political parties were organized and ran candidates to the Yukon Legislative Assembly for the first time in 1978. The Progressive Conservatives won these elections and formed the first party government of the Yukon in January 1979. The Yukon New Democratic Party (NDP) formed the government from 1985 to 1992 under Tony Penikett and again from 1996 under Piers McDonald until being defeated in 2000. The conservatives returned to power in 1992 under John Ostashek after having renamed themselves the Yukon Party. The Liberal government of Pat Duncan was defeated in elections in November 2002, with Dennis Fentie of the Yukon Party forming the government as premier. In 2003, the old Yukon Act was repealed and replaced by a new Yukon Act, which continued the existing powers of the Yukon Government, and devolved additional powers to the territorial government such as control over land and natural resources.

=== Federal representation ===
At the federal level, the Yukon is represented in the Parliament of Canada by one member of Parliament (MP) and one senator. MPs from Canadian territories are full and equal voting representatives and residents of the territory enjoy the same rights as other Canadian citizens. One Yukon MP, Erik Nielsen, served as Deputy Prime Minister under Brian Mulroney, while another, Audrey McLaughlin, was the leader of the federal New Democratic Party (NDP) from 1989 to 1995.

=== First Nations ===
A substantial minority of the territory's population is First Nations. An umbrella land claim agreement representing 7,432 members of fourteen different First Nations was signed with the federal government in 1993. Eleven of the fourteen Yukon First Nations have negotiated and signed comprehensive land claim and self-government agreements. The fourteen First Nations speak eight different languages.

The territory once had an Inuit settlement, located on Herschel Island off the Arctic Ocean coast. This settlement was dismantled in 1987 and its inhabitants relocated to the neighbouring Northwest Territories. As a result of the Inuvialuit Final Agreement, the island is now a territorial park and is known officially as Qikiqtaruk Territorial Park, Qikiqtaruk being the name of the island in Inuvialuktun.

Government	Seat	Chief
Carcross/Tagish First Nation	Carcross	Khà Shâde Héni Andy Carvill
Champagne and Aishihik First Nations	Haines Junction	Steve Smith
First Nation of Na-cho Nyak Dun	Mayo	Simon Mervyn
Kluane First Nation	Burwash Landing	Mathieya Alatini
Kwanlin Dün First Nation	Whitehorse	Doris Bill
Liard River First Nation	Watson Lake	Daniel Morris
Little Salmon/Carmacks First Nation	Carmacks	Eric Fairclough
Ross River Dena Council	Ross River	Dylan Loblaw
Selkirk First Nation	Pelly Crossing	Kevin McGinty
Ta'an Kwach'an Council	Whitehorse	Kristina Kane
Teslin Tlingit Council	Teslin	Richard Sidney
Tr'ondëk Hwëch'in	Dawson City	Roberta Joseph
Vuntut Gwitchin First Nation	Old Crow	Dana Tizya-Tramm
White River First Nation	Beaver Creek	Angela Demit

== Transportation ==
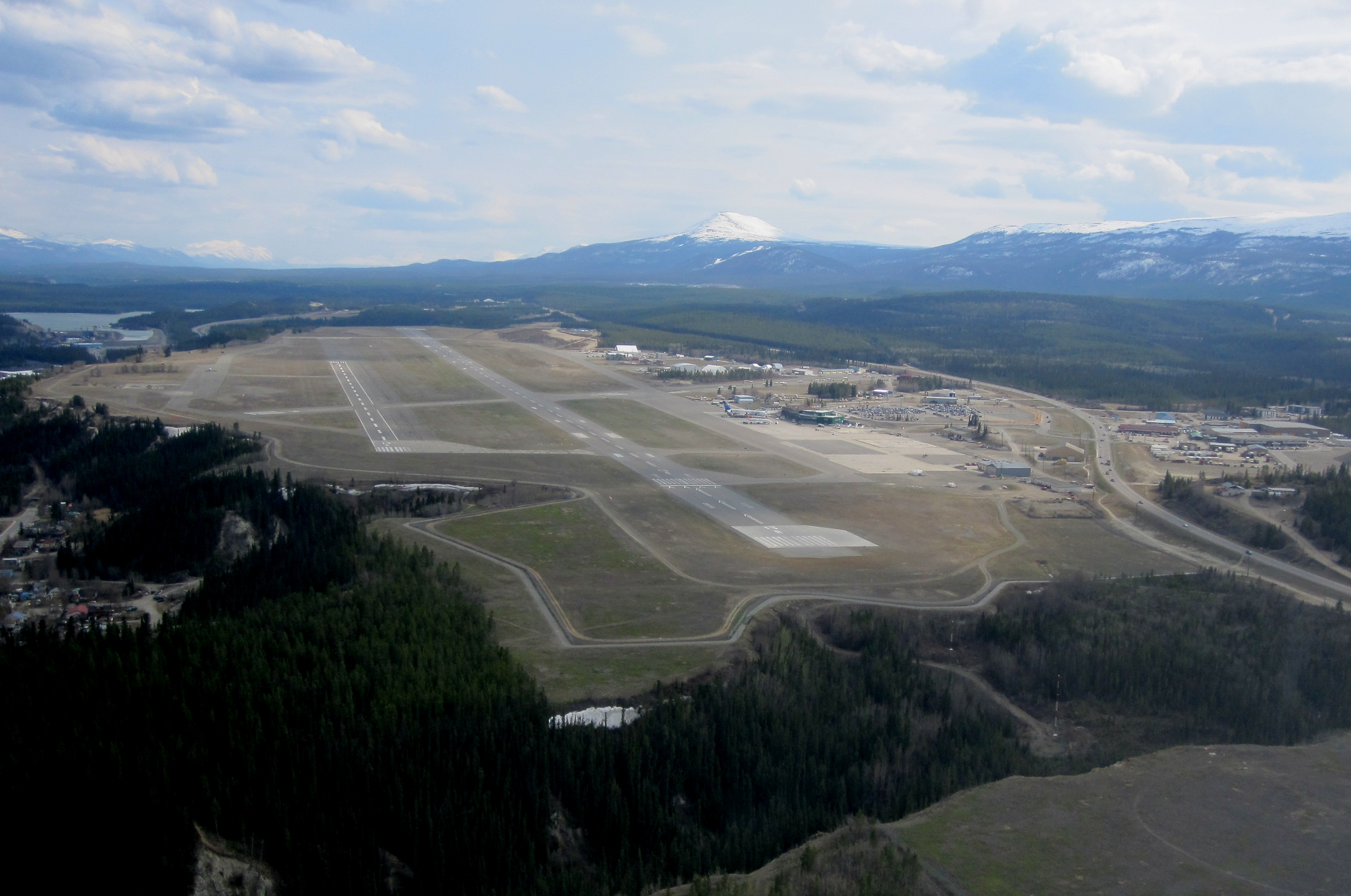
Erik Nielsen Whitehorse International Airport serves as the air transport hub for Yukon

Before modern forms of transportation, the rivers and mountain passes were the main transportation routes for the coastal Tlingit people trading with the Athabascans of the Chilkoot Pass and Dalton Trail, as well as the first Europeans.

=== Air ===
Erik Nielsen Whitehorse International Airport serves as the air transport infrastructure hub, with scheduled direct flights to Calgary, Dawson City, Edmonton, Inuvik, Kelowna, Old Crow, Ottawa, Toronto–Pearson, Vancouver, Victoria, and Yellowknife. It was formerly connected to Frankfurt by Condor before the airline temporarily suspended the route in 2023 until the completion of a runway reconstruction project when services are expected to resume.

=== Rail ===
The railway ceased operation in the 1980s with the first closure of the Faro mine. It is now run during the summer months for the tourism season, with operations between Carcross and Skagway, Alaska.

=== Roads ===
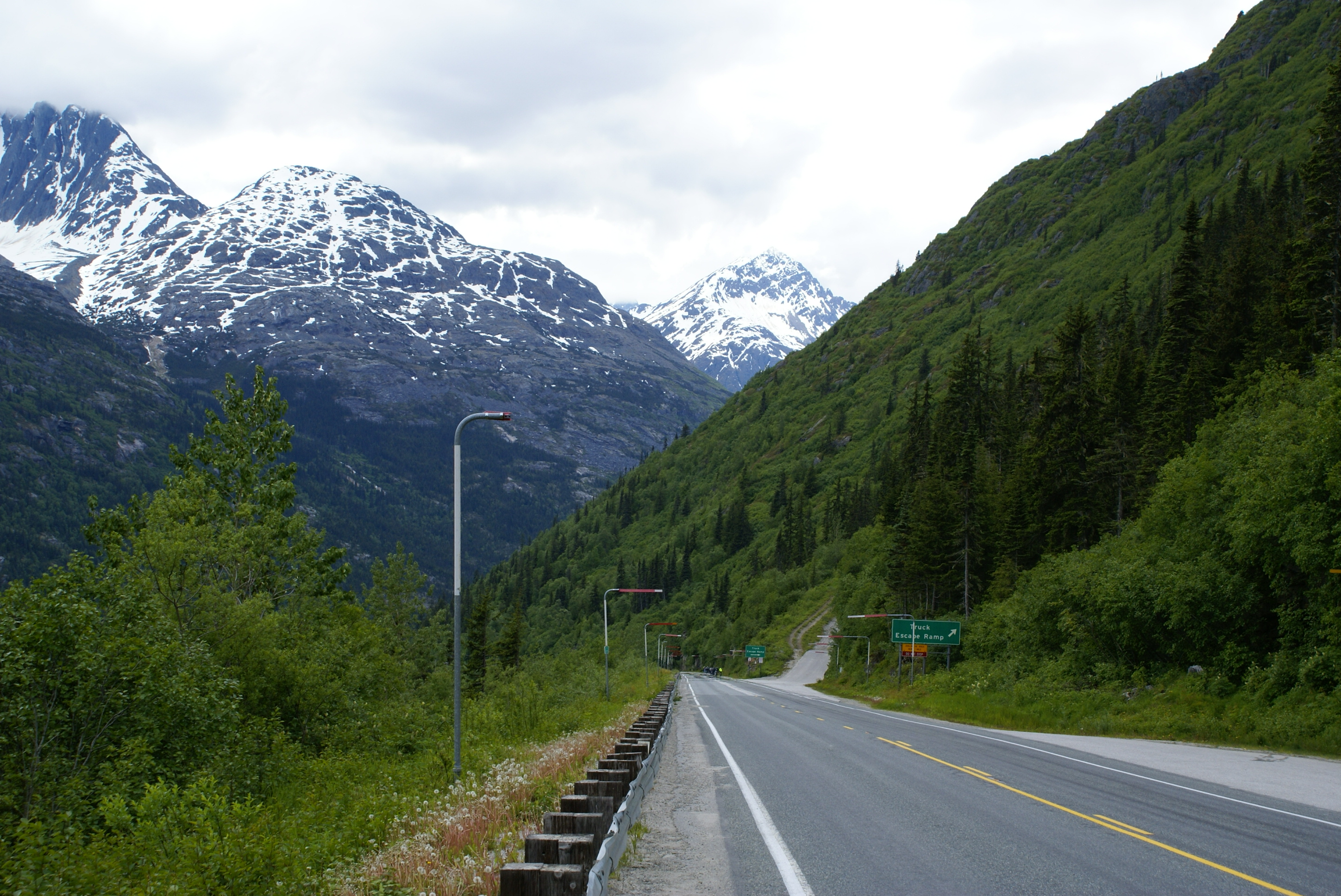
The Klondike Highway is one of several territorial highways in Yukon.

Today, major land routes include the Alaska Highway, the Klondike Highway (between Skagway and Dawson City), the Haines Highway (between Haines, Alaska, and Haines Junction), and the Dempster Highway (linking Inuvik, Northwest Territories to the Klondike Highway, and the only road access route to the Arctic Ocean in Canada), all paved except for the Dempster. Other highways with less traffic include the Robert Campbell Highway linking Carmacks (on the Klondike Highway) to Watson Lake (Alaska Highway) via Faro and Ross River, and the Silver Trail linking the old silver mining communities of Mayo, Elsa, and Keno City to the Klondike Highway at the Stewart River bridge. Air travel is the only way to reach the far-north community of Old Crow.

=== Waterways ===
From the Gold Rush until the 1950s, riverboats plied the Yukon River, mostly between Whitehorse and Dawson City, with some making their way further to Alaska and over to the Bering Sea, and other tributaries of the Yukon River such as the Stewart River. Most of the riverboats were owned by the British-Yukon Navigation Company, an arm of the White Pass and Yukon Route, which also operated a narrow-gauge railway between Skagway, Alaska, and Whitehorse.

== See also ==
- Outline of Yukon
