= Ivvavik National Park =

National Park located in Yukon, Canada

Ivvavik National Park Parc national Ivvavik (French)
- IUCN category II (national park)
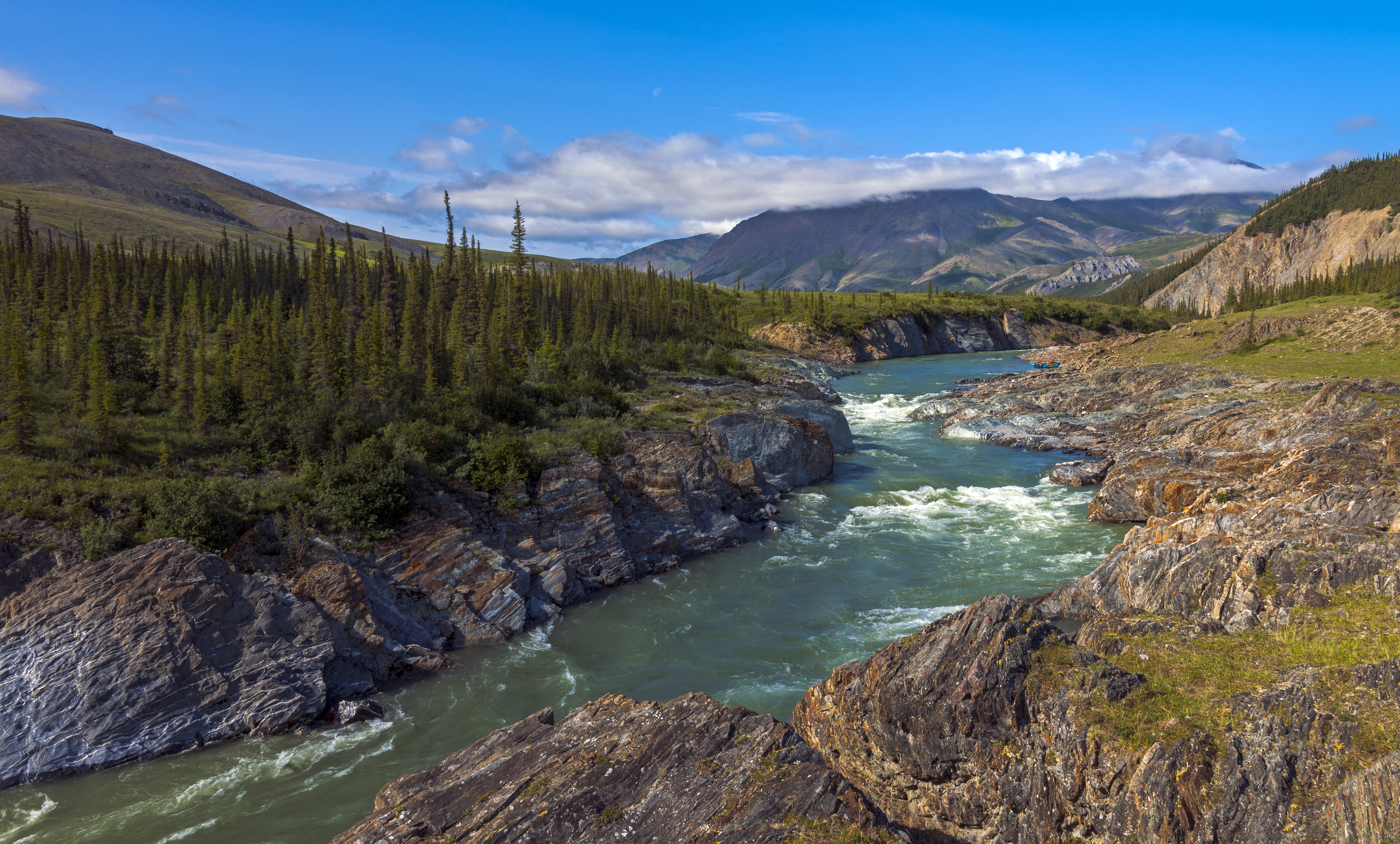
- Sheep Slot Rapids on the Firth River

- Location within Canada
- Interactive map of Ivvavik National Park; Parc national Ivvavik (French)
- Location: Yukon, Canada
- Nearest city: Inuvik
- Coordinates: 69°31′11″N 139°31′30″W
- Area: 10,168 km^{2} (3,926 sq mi)
- Established: 1984
- Visitors: 179 (in 2022–23)
- Governing body: Parks Canada

Ivvavik National Park (/ˈiːvəvɪk/ EE-və-vik) is a national park of Canada located in the Yukon. Initially named "Northern Yukon National Park", the park was renamed Ivvavik in 1992 for the Inuvialuktun word meaning "nursery" or "birthplace", in reference to the importance of the area as a calving ground for Porcupine caribou. Created as a result of the Inuvialuit Final Agreement in 1984, negotiated between the Canadian Government and the Inuvialuit of the Northern Yukon, Ivvavik is the first national park in Canada to be established as a result of an aboriginal land claims agreement. About 100 people visit the park each year.

== Geography and climate ==
Ivvavik contains the British Mountains which run east to west, parallel to the Arctic coast, and merge into the Brooks Range in Alaska. Draining north through the Park from the British Mountains is the Firth River, the oldest river in Canada and considered one of the great rafting rivers of the world. The river starts from year-round aufeis formations at the headwaters and then flows through extensive canyon areas before forming a huge delta as it enters the Beaufort Sea just west of Herschel Island. The first raft descent was by Martyn Williams, Alan Dennis and Jim Boyde. Gold miners have operated on the Firth River and at Sheep Creek until the area became a National Park.

To its the south, Ivvavik National Park borders Vuntut National Park, established in 1995 as part of the Vuntut Gwitchin First Nation Final Agreement.

Climate data for Ivvavik National Park Climate ID: 2100660; coordinates 69°09′52″N 140°09′00″W; elevation: 243.8 m (800 ft); WMO ID: 71978; 1991–2020 normals, extremes 1995–present
Month	Jan	Feb	Mar	Apr	May	Jun	Jul	Aug	Sep	Oct	Nov	Dec	Year
Record high humidex	6.4	0.9	4.2	13.0	27.4	30.8	33.2	31.4	22.0	14.4	2.9	1.9	33.2
Record high °C (°F)	6.5 (43.7)	1.5 (34.7)	5.4 (41.7)	13.2 (55.8)	27.9 (82.2)	30.1 (86.2)	31.5 (88.7)	30.4 (86.7)	22.4 (72.3)	14.7 (58.5)	3.7 (38.7)	2.3 (36.1)	31.5 (88.7)
Mean daily maximum °C (°F)	−19.9 (−3.8)	−18.8 (−1.8)	−16.4 (2.5)	−5.0 (23.0)	6.7 (44.1)	16.6 (61.9)	18.4 (65.1)	14.0 (57.2)	7.3 (45.1)	−5.2 (22.6)	−14.8 (5.4)	−18.8 (−1.8)	−3.0 (26.6)
Daily mean °C (°F)	−24.1 (−11.4)	−23.2 (−9.8)	−21.8 (−7.2)	−11.0 (12.2)	1.0 (33.8)	10.2 (50.4)	12.6 (54.7)	8.9 (48.0)	2.8 (37.0)	−9.2 (15.4)	−18.8 (−1.8)	−22.9 (−9.2)	−8.0 (17.6)
Mean daily minimum °C (°F)	−28.3 (−18.9)	−27.6 (−17.7)	−27.1 (−16.8)	−17.0 (1.4)	−4.6 (23.7)	3.7 (38.7)	6.7 (44.1)	3.6 (38.5)	−1.8 (28.8)	−13.2 (8.2)	−22.8 (−9.0)	−27.1 (−16.8)	−12.9 (8.8)
Record low °C (°F)	−45.0 (−49.0)	−43.7 (−46.7)	−44.0 (−47.2)	−36.4 (−33.5)	−23.7 (−10.7)	−8.5 (16.7)	−2.7 (27.1)	−8.4 (16.9)	−18.5 (−1.3)	−36.3 (−33.3)	−38.2 (−36.8)	−43.7 (−46.7)	−45.0 (−49.0)
Record low wind chill	−56.5	−54.5	−55.7	−44.2	−30.8	−12.6	−7.1	−11.6	−21.9	−46.8	−49.5	−56.8	−56.8
Average precipitation mm (inches)	—	—	—	22.4 (0.88)	3.7 (0.15)	19.1 (0.75)	41.9 (1.65)	40.3 (1.59)	28.7 (1.13)	—	—	—	—
Average precipitation days (≥ 0.2 mm)	—	—	—	26.0	2.7	6.0	12.0	14.8	13.7	—	—	—	—
Average relative humidity (%) (at 1500 LST)	67.8	66.2	57.5	56.6	55.5	52.0	59.1	62.6	63.9	73.5	73.1	71.0	63.2
Source: Environment and Climate Change Canada

== Ecology ==
The park contains many cultural sites of continuing importance to the local indigenous people. Protecting a portion of the calving grounds of the caribou herd, the park allows only a minimal number of people to visit per year.

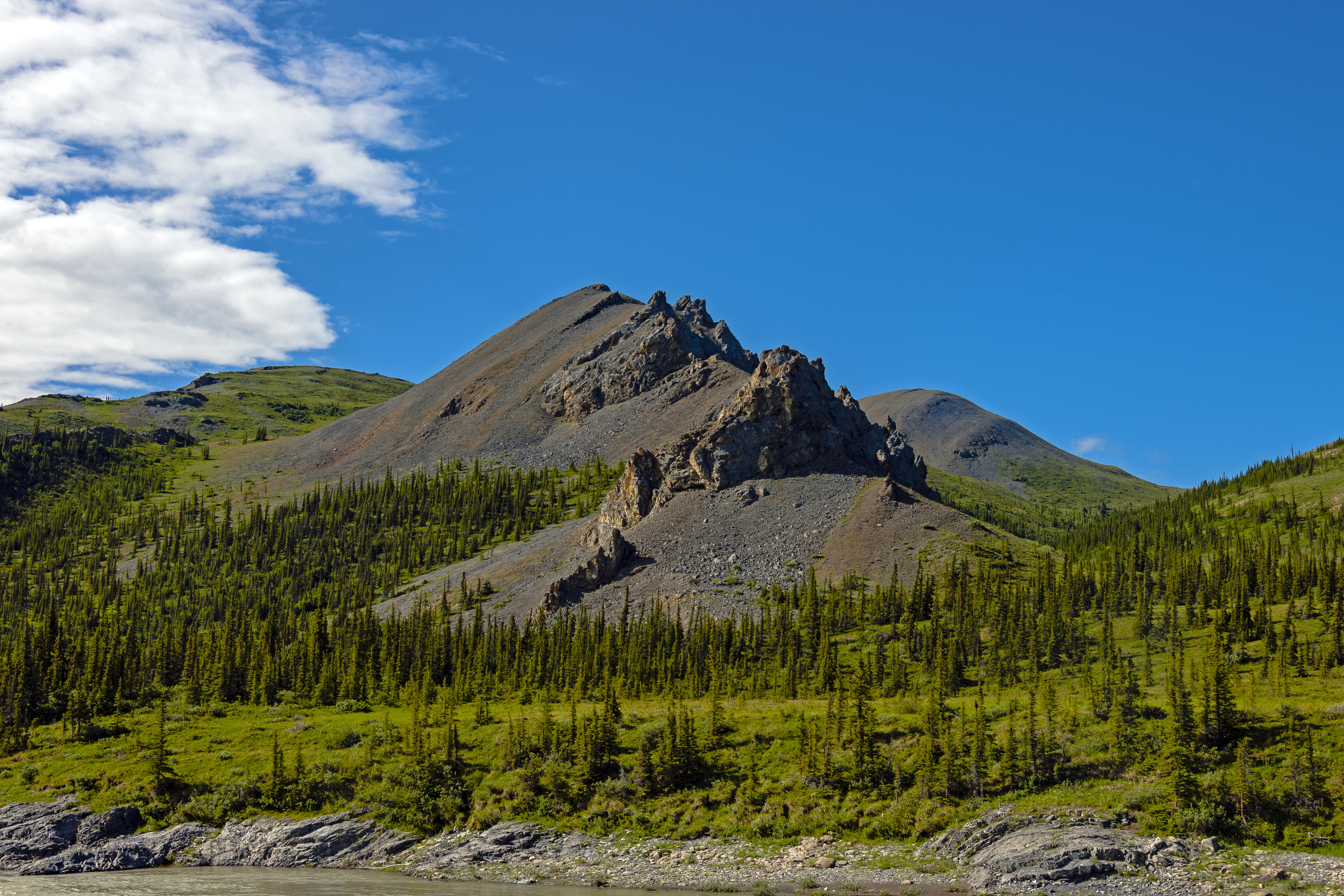
Mountain informally named "Stegosaurus Ridge" for its resemblance to the dinosaur, above the Firth River, in Canada's Ivvavik National Park

On the shore of Beaufort Sea, abundant Yukon wolves, grizzly bears, and black bears inhabit the area. Other animals that inhabit this park include two species of fox, Yukon moose, lemmings, Dall sheep, gyrfalcons, muskoxen, and wolverines. The area around Sheep Creek is the northernmost extension of Dall sheep habitat in Canada. The Arctic National Wildlife Refuge lies just across the border in Alaska. The Firth River holds some of the longest stocks of Dolly Varden char in western Canada.

== Activities and access ==
The most practical way to enter Ivvavik National Park is via charter aircraft from Inuvik, which is 200 km (120 mi) from the park. Activities such as rafting, fishing, wildlife viewing, camping, and hiking are available in the park. Rafting is available in late June to early August and rafting on the Firth River is a popular activity. A permit is required to fish in the park. There is a daily catch and possession limit of one Dolly Varden char with a restriction of three fish total. Camping is allowed in all areas of the park except archaeological sites and the park does not have any marked hiking trails.

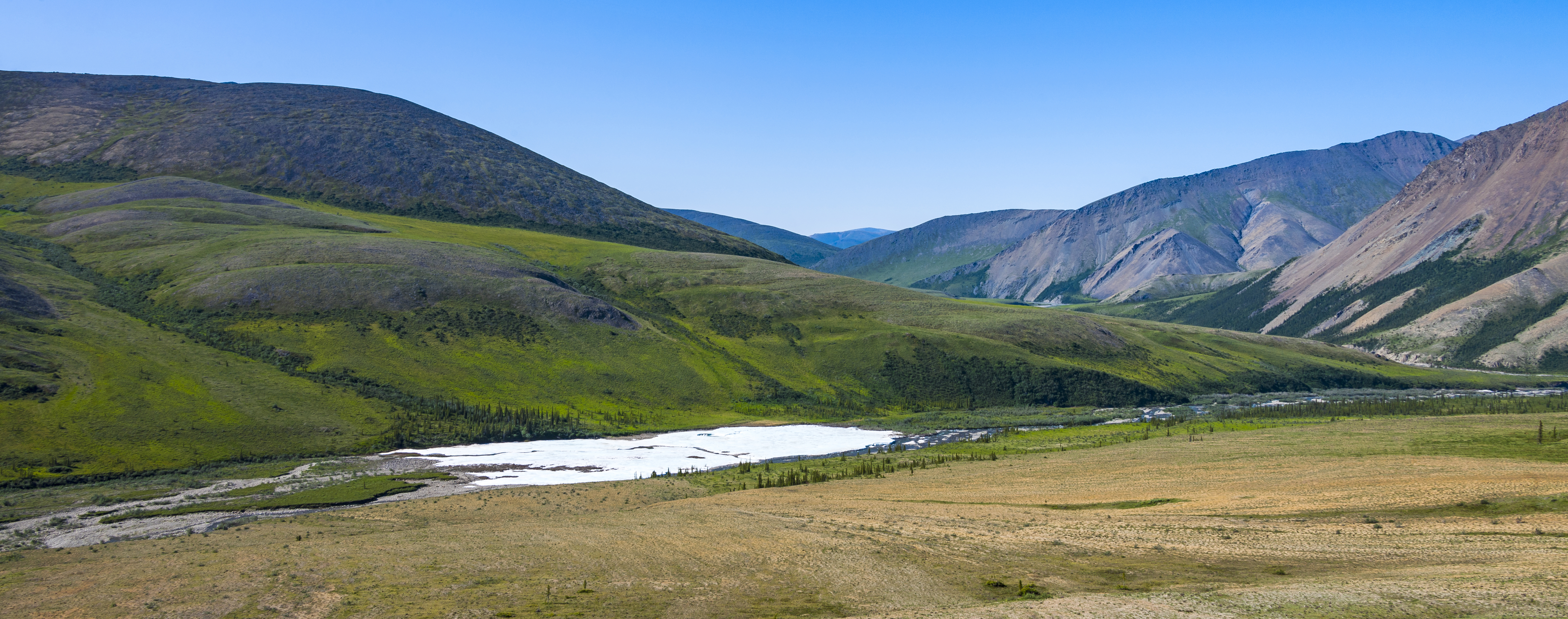
Aufeis on Wolf Creek, above the confluence with Firth River

== See also ==
- National Parks of Canada
- List of National Parks of Canada
- List of Yukon parks
