= Yukon Sourdough Rendezvous =

The Yukon Sourdough Rendezvous Festival is an annual celebration that happens in Whitehorse, Yukon, Canada in February. In 2014, the festival celebrated its 50th anniversary.
