= Vuntut National Park =

National park in Yukon, Canada

- Parc national Vuntut
- IUCN category II (national park)
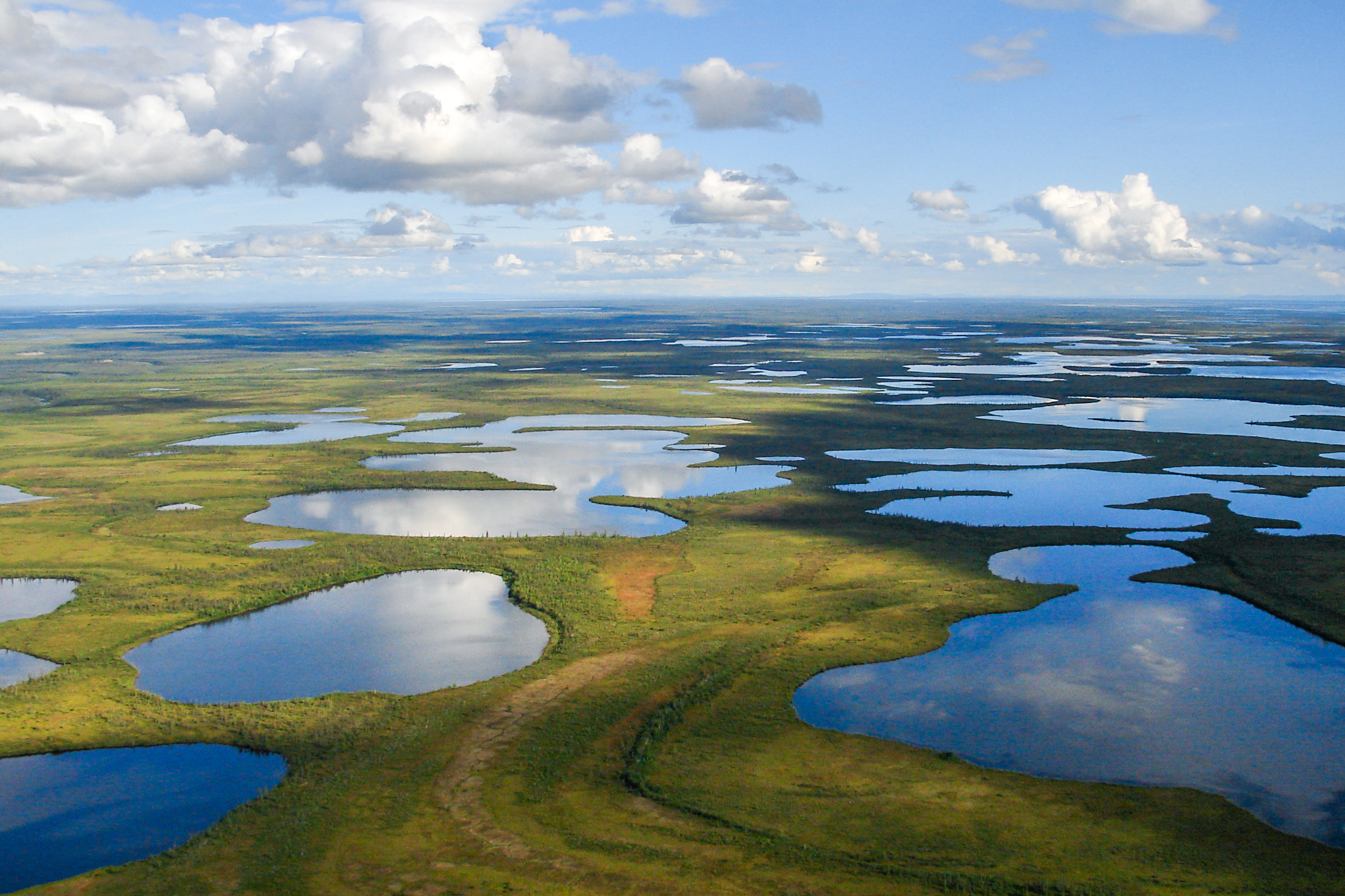

- Location within Canada
- Interactive map of Vuntut National Park
- Location: Yukon, Canada
- Nearest town: Old Crow, Yukon
- Coordinates: 68°22′N 139°51′W
- Area: 4,345 km^{2} (1,678 sq mi)
- Established: 1995
- Governing body: Parks Canada

Vuntut National Park (/ˈvʊntʊt/; French: Parc national Vuntut) is a national park located in northern Yukon, Canada. It was established in 1995 as part of the Vuntut Gwitchin First Nation Final Agreement, to conserve, protect and present to Canadians a portion of the North Yukon Natural Region, to recognize Vuntut Gwitchin history and culture, and to protect the traditional and current use of the park by the Vuntut Gwitchin. The name Vuntut comes from the Gwichʼin for among the lakes. Fewer than 25 people visit the park each year.

Accessing the park can be challenging due to its remote wilderness. During the summer the park is commonly accessed by air or boat. In the winter it is commonly accessed by air or land. The best time to visit the park is from June to August. The park is open year-round and there are no facilities or developed trails. A permit is required for backcountry use and camping. Sport-fishing is not allowed in the park.

Animals that inhabit this park include caribou, foxes, peregrine falcons, Yukon moose, grizzly bears, Yukon wolves, muskrats, black bears, wolverines, gyrfalcons, muskoxen, golden eagles, pine martens, ground squirrels, lynxes, and minks.

Vuntut National Park is adjacent to another Canadian national park, Ivvavik National Park. The Arctic National Wildlife Refuge also lies just across the Canada–US border in Alaska.

== See also ==
- National Parks of Canada
- List of National Parks of Canada
- List of Yukon parks
