= List of rivers of Yukon =

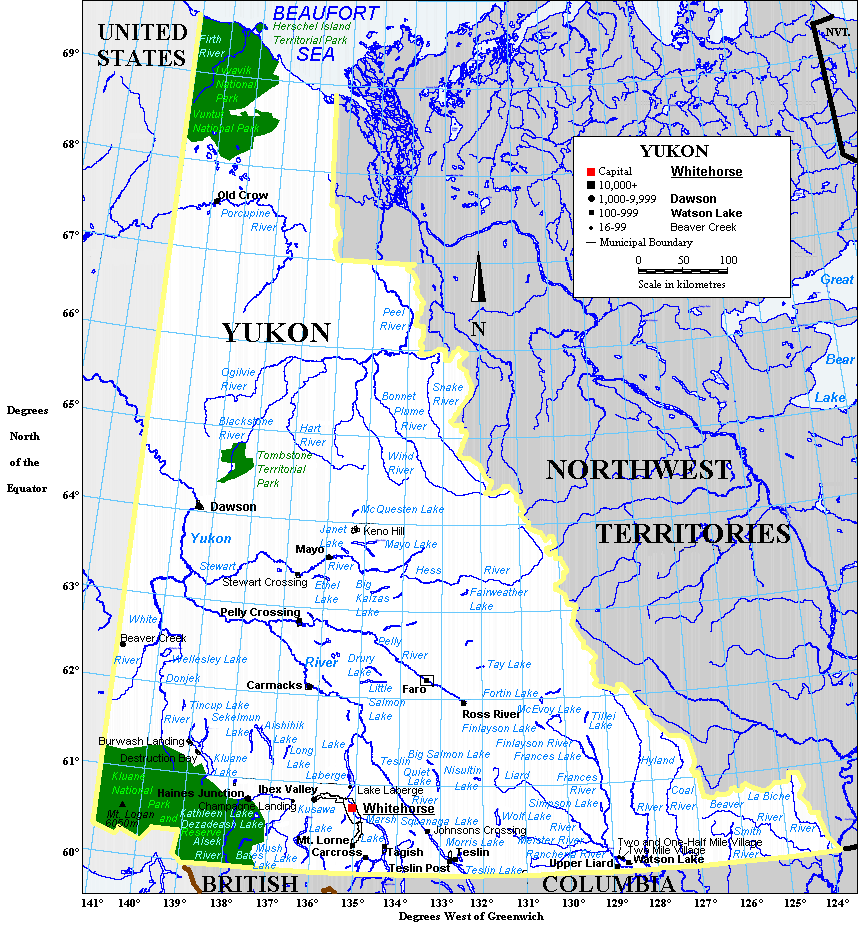
Map Yukon, Canada

This is a list of rivers of Yukon. The territory drains through six major watersheds: the Alsek, Yukon, Porcupine, Peel, Liard, and North Slope.

== Arctic Ocean watershed ==
- Mackenzie River watershed
  - Upper Liard River
    - Rancheria River
      - Little Rancheria River
    - Frances River
    - Hyland River
    - Coal River
    - La Biche River
    - Beaver River (Liard River tributary)
      - Whitefish River
    - Kotaneelee River
    - Smith River
    - South Nahanni River
  - Peel River
    - Ogilvie River
    - Blackstone River
    - Hart River
    - Wind River
    - Bonnet Plume River
    - Snake River
- Firth River
- Malcolm River
- Trail River
- Babbage River
- Blow River
- Clarence River

== Bering Sea watershed ==
- Yukon River 1,973 miles (3,175 km)
  - Marsh Lake
    - McClintock Creek
    - Tagish River
      - Tagish Lake
        - Bennett Lake
        - Atlin Lake
        - Nares River
          - Little Atlin Lake
          - Partridge River
  - Teslin River
    - Teslin Lake
      - Nisutlin River
        - Wolf Rover
    - Dän Tàgé
    - Morley River
  - Takhini River
    - Kusawa Lake
    - Swift River
  - Big Salmon River
    - Quiet Lake
  - Nordenskiold River
  - Pelly River
    - Hoole River
    - Ross River
    - South MacMillan River
    - Macmillan River
  - Stewart River
    - Beaver River (Stewart River)
    - Hess River
    - McQuesten River
    - Scroggie Creek
  - White River
    - Donjek River
      - Kluane River
        - Kluane Lake
          - Slims River
      - Nisling River
  - Sixtymile River
    - Miller Creek
  - Indian River
  - Klondike River
    - Bonanza Creek
      - Eldorado Creek
  - Fortymile River
  - Porcupine River
    - Miner River
    - Fishing Branch
    - Bell River
      - Rock River
      - Eagle River
    - Old Crow River
    - Bluefish River
    - Rapid River
  - Kandik River

== Pacific Ocean watershed ==
- Alsek River
  - Kaskawulsh River
  - Jarvis River
  - Dezadeash River
    - Aishihik River or Canyon Creek
- Tatshenshini River
  - Klukshu River
  - Blanchard River (Yukon)

== Alphabetical list ==
Aishihik River or Canyon Creek
Alsek River
Babbage River
Beaver River (Liard River tributary)
Beaver River (Stewart River)
Big Salmon River
Blackstone River
Blow River
Bluefish River
Bonnet Plume River
Clarence River
Coal River
Dezadeash River
Donjek River
Eagle River
Firth River
Fishing Branch
Fortymile River
Hart River
Hess River
Holbrook Creek
Hoole River
Hyland River
Indian River
Jarvis River
Kandik River
Kaskawulsh River
Klondike River
Kluane River
Klukshu River
Kotaneelee River
La Biche River
Liard River
Little Rancheria River
Malcolm River
McCabe Creek
McClintock Creek
McQuesten River
Macmillan River
Miller Creek
Moose Creek (Yukon)
Morley River
Nares River
Nisling River
Nisutlin River
Nordenskiold River
Ogilvie River
Old Crow River
Partridge River
Peel River
Pelly River
Porcupine River
Rapid River
Rosebud Creek
Ross River
Scroggie Creek
Sixtymile River
Slims River
Smith River
South MacMillan River
South Nahanni River
Stewart River
Swift River
Tagish River
Takhini River
Tatshenshini River
Teslin River
Trail River
White River
Whitefish River
Wind River
Wolf River
Yukon River

== See also ==
- List of rivers of Canada
- List of rivers of the Americas
