= Old Crow (disambiguation) =

Old Crow is a brand of bourbon whiskey.

Old Crow may also refer to:

- Old Crow, Yukon, Canada, a community
- Vuntut Gwitchin (electoral district), Yukon, formerly known as Old Crow
- Old Crow River, which flows from Alaska to Yukon
- "Old Crow", a nickname for Allied World War II electronic warfare personnel – see Association of Old Crows
- Old Crow, a long-established public house in Brentry, England
- "Old Crow", a nickname for Mitch McConnell

== See also ==
- Old Crow Flats, Yukon, a wetland
- Old Crows / Young Cardinals, a 2009 album by post-hardcore band Alexisonfire
