= Kaskawulsh River =

River in Yukon, Canada

Coordinates: 60°38′58″N 137°48′41″W

- The Kaskawulsh River viewed from Vulcan Mountain in June 1992

Location
- Country: Canada
- Territory: Yukon

Physical characteristics
- Source: Kaskawulsh Glacier
- Mouth: Alsek River
  - location: Confluence with the Dezadeash River

Basin features
- River system: Alsek River

The Kaskawulsh River is a glacially fed river in Yukon, Canada. It carries meltwater from the Kaskawulsh Glacier and joins the Dezadeash River to form the Alsek River in Kluane National Park and Reserve.

In May 2016, retreat of the Kaskawulsh Glacier diverted meltwater that had supplied the Slims River into the Kaskawulsh drainage. The event was an example of stream capture, also known as river piracy, associated with climate change.

== Geography ==
The river drains the eastern side of the Kaskawulsh Glacier's terminus. Its waters enter the Alsek River, which flows through Yukon, British Columbia and Alaska before reaching the Gulf of Alaska. The name Kaskawulsh River was officially adopted on 2 June 1950.

Before 2016, meltwater from the glacier followed two drainage routes. The Slims River carried water north into Kluane Lake and ultimately the Bering Sea, while the Kaskawulsh River carried water towards the Gulf of Alaska. The glacier's terminus lay on the divide between these drainage systems.

== 2016 river capture ==
In spring 2016, glacier retreat allowed a new channel to connect two lakes at the glacier's terminus. A canyon approximately 30 metres (98 ft) deep carried water from the lake that had supplied the Slims River into the lake draining to the Kaskawulsh River. Gauges recorded a sharp decline in the Slims River between 26 and 29 May. The diversion increased flow in the Kaskawulsh River while leaving the Slims River largely dry.

A study published in Nature Geoscience in 2017 documented the change using hydrological measurements, satellite imagery and elevation models produced from drone surveys. Its authors attributed the river capture to glacier retreat driven by human-caused climate change. They identified potential downstream effects on ecosystems, sediment transport and communities dependent on the affected waterways.

The diversion also reduced inflow to Kluane Lake. By summer 2016, the lake was approximately 1 metre (3.3 ft) below the previous recorded minimum for that time of year, while the Alsek River received additional water.

== See also ==
- List of rivers of Yukon
