= Peel River =

The Peel River may refer to:

- Peel River (New South Wales) in Australia
- Peel River (Canada) in the Yukon and Northwest Territories, Canada
