= Scroggie Creek =

Watercourse in Yukon, Canada

Coordinates: 63°11′51″N 138°51′06″W

Scroggie Creek is a tributary of the Stewart River in Yukon, Canada. Every February, it forms part of the trail for the 1,000-mile Yukon Quest sled dog race. The creek has some placer gold deposits being actively mined.

== See also ==
- List of rivers of Yukon
