= Eagle River (Yukon) =

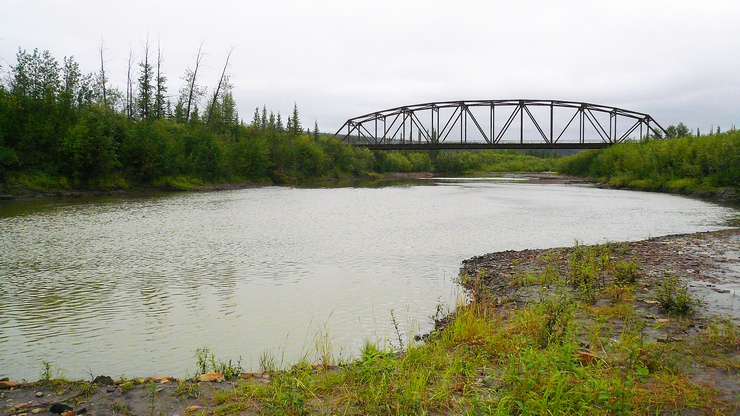
- The Dempster Highway bridge over the Eagle River
- Native name: Ch'izhìn Njik; Ezhìnjik (Gwichʼin)

Location
- Country: Canada
- Territory: Yukon
- Area: Unorganized Yukon

Physical characteristics
- Source
  - coordinates: 66°2′52.33″N 136°35′14.17″W

Basin features
- River system: Yukon River

The Eagle River is a river in the Yukon of northern Canada. It is an important tributary of the Porcupine River.

In the Gwich'in language, it is called Ch'izhìn Njik and Ezhìnjik.

== Geographical context ==
The river is set in a 140-kilometre (87 mi) natural spillway. Its source is in a remote area east of the North Ogilvie Mountains and near Palmer Lake Pass. In the Pleistocene, it linked glacial lakes left by the Laurentide Ice Sheet and carried meltwater. The Eagle River ends at the Bell River and both join the Porcupine River in an area called Bell Basin. The Porcupine is itself a tributary of the Yukon River.

== Course ==
According to geological data from the Government of the Yukon, the Eagle River meets the Bell at an elevation of about 280 m. It is a left tributary of the Bell and they meet west of a place called Sinclair Rock. The confluence is only about 30 km east as the crow flies of the Porcupine River. The course of the Eagle River is fairly winding, but overall, it flows north and north-west. It crosses underneath the Dempster Highway at about 66°26′42.06437″N 136°42′32.51815″W, in an area called Eagle Plains. It source is among an area of lakes elevated nearly 500 m, west of the Richardson Mountains. Much of the Richardson Mountains drain out through tributaries of the Eagle and Bell rivers, though the more southern portions are part of the Peel River watershed.

== History ==
The Eagle River may not have been seen by European explorers until 1839, when John Bell travelled in the Yukon. More recently, the Eagle River was the site of "the first aircraft-assisted manhunt in Canada"—the search for Albert Johnson, known as the "Mad Trapper of Rat River", who made a cabin on the Eagle River while chased by RCMP, before being finally shot in a ravine near the river's mouth.
