= John Bell (explorer) =

John Bell (c. 1799 – 24 June 1868) was a Scottish explorer.

== Biography ==
John Bell was born in Isle of Mull, Scotland and emigrated to Canada where he worked for the Hudson's Bay Company as a fur trader and colonizer. He was one of the colonizers of the Yukon River. Bell was appreciated by the company for his "professionalism, flexibility and dedication to the interests of the fur trade" as well as his abilities as a "manager of men".

In 1839, he was sent to colonize the land west of the Mackenzie River. With the assistance of Alexander Kennedy Isbister, he established Fort McPherson, Northwest Territories on the Peel River not far from the Mackenzie, and colonized the Peel into what is now the Yukon Territory.

In 1845, Bell crossed the mountains into the Yukon River watershed, and went down the Rat River to its confluence with the Porcupine River. The Rat River has been renamed the Bell River in his honour. After managing the fur trade at Fort McPherson until 1845, he returned to the Bell River, and Followed the Porcupine to its juncture with the Yukon River, the eventual site of Fort Yukon. He set the stage for the Yukon trade which proved extremely lucrative for the Hudson's Bay Company and for Canada's claim over what is now the Yukon Territory.

He had some involvement in organizing John Rae's 1848–1849 expedition to search for Sir John Franklin, and continued working in the Mackenzie District for the Hudson's Bay Company until 1860. Although his exploits as an explorer are most often publicized, Bell preferred to work as a manager and organizer. He accepted the exploring jobs as required but did so "without the enthusiasm and sense of destiny that inspired other HBC explorers. He was, in fact, a fur trader rather than an explorer, both in talent and temperament."

Bell completed his career in Quebec, retiring from the company in 1860. He then moved to Saugeen, Ontario and farmed in the area until his death.
