= Rapid River (Alaska-Yukon) =

- Location of the mouth of Rapid River in Alaska
- Etymology: Named because of the "boulder stream rapids that extend three quarters of a mile up stream from its mouth."

Location
- Countries: Canada; United States
- Territory: Yukon
- State: Alaska

Physical characteristics
- Source: Lahchah Mountain
  - location: Northwest Yukon, Yukon, Canada
  - coordinates: 67°42′13″N 140°43′01″W
  - elevation: 745 m (2,444 ft)
- Mouth: Porcupine River
  - location: Yukon–Koyukuk Census Area, Alaska, United States
  - coordinates: 67°16′37″N 141°37′58″W
  - elevation: 197 m (646 ft)
- Length: 75 km (47 mi)

The Rapid River is a river in Yukon, Canada and Alaska, United States.

== Etymology ==
The stream was published as Sucker River by the U.S. Coast and Geodetic Survey (USC&GS) in 1890. The current name was mentioned by R. G. McConnell of the Geological Survey of Canada in 1888. It was so named because of the "boulder stream rapids that extend three quarters of a mile up stream from its mouth."

== Hydrology ==
The source of the Rapid River is on the slopes of Lahchah Mountain at an elevation of 745 metres (2,444 ft), about 40 kilometres (25 mi) northwest of Old Crow. The river travels 15 kilometres (9 mi) west to reach the United States border, where it crosses into Yukon–Koyukuk Census Area, Alaska at 67°38′30″N 141°00′00″W at an elevation of 476 metres (1,562 ft). The river reaches its mouth at the Porcupine River at an elevation of 197 metres (646 ft), 12.8 kilometres (8.0 mi) north of the settlement of Old Rampart.

== See also ==
- List of rivers of Alaska
- List of rivers of Yukon
