= Alexander Kennedy Isbister =

Métis explorer, writer and educator

Alexander Kennedy Isbister (June 1822 – 28 May 1883) was born at Cumberland House, Rupert's Land (now Saskatchewan). He was an HBC employee in his early career and later was a lawyer and an educational writer and author of many school books.

Isbister was Métis and educated in Orkney and at the Red River Colony. His first HBC posting was to Fort Simpson, Northwest Territories, which is in the Mackenzie River District. He assisted John Bell in establishing Fort McPherson on the Peel River. During that period, he explored the Mackenzie River basin and later used the information gathered to produce important geological writings and the first chromolithograph map for the area.

In 1842, Alexander left for Britain where he enrolled at Aberdeen University. was an educator and lawyer and a champion of Métis rights. The passion over Métis rights grew out of discrimination he had felt during his tenure with the Hudson's Bay Company.

He became second master at Islington Proprietary School, London in 1849 and was master (1850–1855), headmaster of the Jews' College, Finsbury Square (1855–1858), and Master of the Stationers' Company's School (1858–1882).

In 1861, the Royal College of Preceptors (College of Teachers) established The Educational Times as its official journal. Isbister was appointed as its editor and held the position for many years. In 1873, he was elected as the College's dean, in part, due to his conservative, scholarly and cautious approach to educational development. He held the position until his death, at no. 20 Milner Square, Islington.

The Alexander Kennedy Isbister Award for Non-fiction writing is awarded annually by the Manitoba Book Awards.
