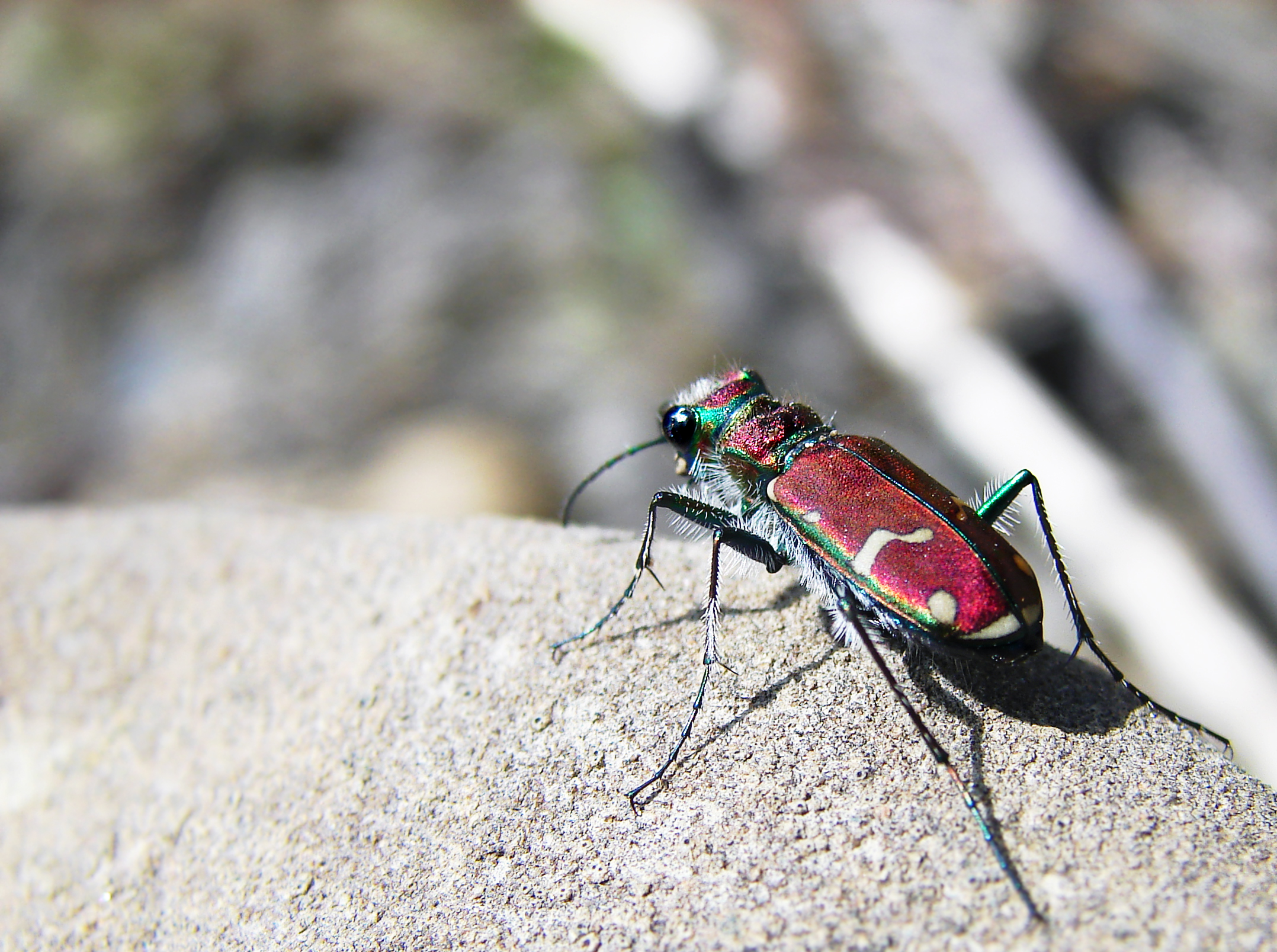

Scientific classification
- Kingdom: Animalia
- Phylum: Arthropoda
- Clade: Pancrustacea
- Class: Insecta
- Order: Coleoptera
- Suborder: Adephaga
- Family: Cicindelidae
- Tribe: Cicindelini
- Subtribe: Cicindelina
- Genus: Cicindela
- Species: C. limbalis

Binomial name
- Cicindela limbalis Klug, 1834

= Cicindela limbalis =

Species of beetle

Cicindela limbalis, the common claybank tiger beetle, is a species of tiger beetle. The length of the beetle is 12–16 millimeters (0.5–0.6 in). The beetle's back is reddish purple and sometimes may be dull green or brown. The species can commonly be found on steep, moist bare clay soil. The beetle can live for 3 years.

== Distribution and habitat ==
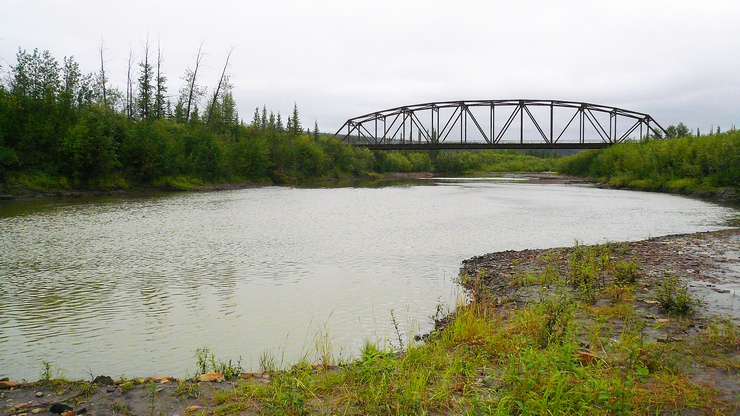
Dempster Highway bridge over the Eagle River in the northern Yukon.

Common claybank tiger beetles are found in North America east of the Rocky Mountains, from the central-eastern coast through the northern half of the Great Plains. According to J. B. Wallis' book The Cicindelidae of Canada, they are known as far north as the Northwest Territories, where they have been recorded from near Tulita and Fort Wrigley, both in Mackenzie River valley. There is one record of the beetle from the north of the Yukon, on the Eagle River at the Dempster Highway. The Global Biodiversity Information Facility database includes a few records of the beetles from the B.C. Interior south and west Prince George, but Wallis gives no records of the beetles from British Columbia. They are known in the central and southern portions of Alberta and Saskatchewan, mostly south of the Heart River in the former province and the North Saskatchewan River in the latter. In Manitoba, their distribution is more southerly, with the beetles only recorded from the Interlake region and southwards. Their distribution in Ontario is fairly far-ranging, as they have been recorded as far north as Smoky Falls; the GBIF records one observation near Summer Beaver and numerous records around Kapuskasing and Timmins. They are found in much of Central and Southern Ontario, though there are no records from the Bruce Peninsula. In Quebec, they are generally found around the Saint Lawrence Valley and northwards. There are records from around Opasatica Lake near the Ontario border at Highway 66/Route 117 and further north around the Harricana River. Wallis gives no records for the species in the Gaspésie, Prince Edward Island, mainland Nova Scotia, or New Brunswick; GBIF records agree with the first two but include numerous observations in New Brunswick and a small number of records on mainland Nova Scotia around Antigonish. The beetles are certainly found on Cape Breton Island. According to Wallis, the beetles are found in Newfoundland's Bay of Islands. The GBIF describes a slightly scattered distribution in the United States. They are found in New England, southwards to Virginia, and around the Great Lakes and the northern parts of the Mississippi and Missouri rivers. There are also a great many observations from Colorado, mostly around the cities of Boulder and Fort Collins. The beetles are recorded sparsely from the nearby states of Wyoming, Montana, North and South Dakota, Nebraska, Kansas, and Oklahoma, and there are no records from Kentucky or Indiana, despite the beetles being observed in areas to the west, north, and east of those states. The southernmost record in the GBIF databse is from LeFlore County, Oklahoma.

Their habitat is bare clay slopes, often on river banks. According to Wallis, C. limbalis occupies a niche reliant on steep clay slopes: he describes a 1908 experiment wherein beetles of this species were collected and given the choice of clay versus other soil types and of steep versus flat ground in which to reproduce. The clay soil and steep incline habitats both contained more larvae than their rivals by ratios of 46:1.
