= Clarence River =

Clarence River may refer to:

- Clarence River (New South Wales), in northern New South Wales, Australia
- Clarence River (Tasmania), in southern Tasmania, Australia
- Clarence River (Alaska–Yukon), rises in the Yukon Territory of Canada and crosses the border several times into the U.S. state of Alaska
- Waiau Toa / Clarence River, on the South Island of New Zealand
- Clarence (river), a tributary of the Lys in northern France
