= Old Crow Flats =

Canadian wetland & archaeological site

Coordinates: 67.441°N 139.82°W

- Van Tat
- IUCN category IV (habitat/species management area)
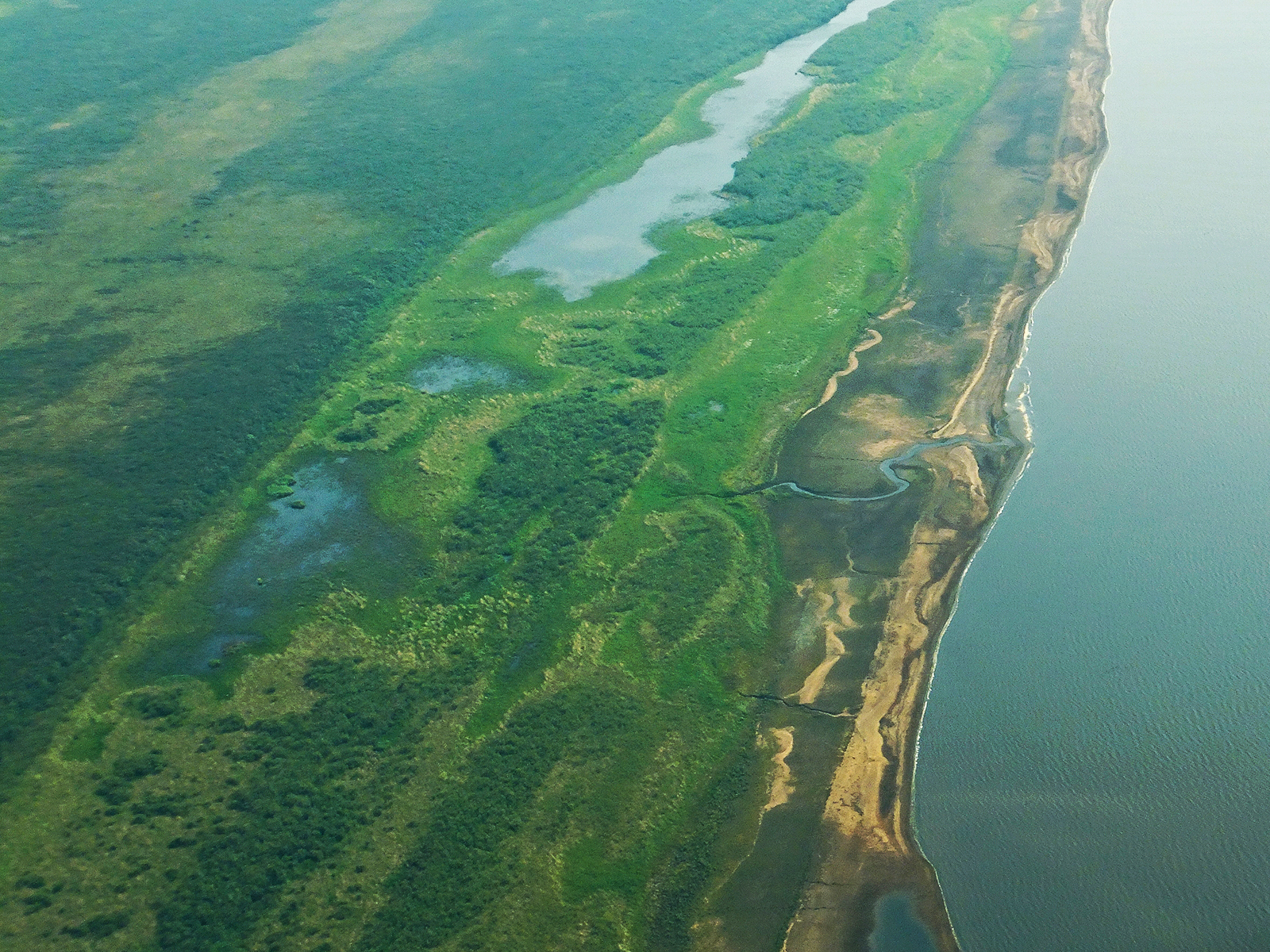
- Shoreline of a large lake in Old Crow Flats
- Interactive map of Old Crow Flats
- Area: 6,170 km^{2} (2,380 sq mi)

Ramsar Wetland
- Designated: 24 May 1982
- Reference no.: 244

Old Crow Flats (Van Tat in the Gwichʼin language) is a 6,170 km^{2} (2,382 sq mi) wetland complex in northern Yukon, Canada along the Old Crow River. It is north of the Arctic Circle and south of the Beaufort Sea, and is nearly surrounded by mountains.

== Site ==
The site is protected by the Yukon Wildlife Ordinance and Canada's Migratory Birds Convention Act. It was identified as part of the International Biological Program inventory, and was designated a wetland of international importance via the Ramsar Convention on May 24, 1982.

The habitat is an important breeding area for aquatic mammals and peregrine falcons, is used for summer moulting by waterfowl, and is an autumn staging site for various species of birds. For these reasons, it is considered an Important Bird Area.

Per the Vuntut Gwitchin Final Agreement, the southern extent of Old Crow Flats (approximately 7,785 km^{2}) is classified as a Special Management Area by the Yukon Government; the northern portion is now part of Vuntut National Park. Old Crow Flats contains more than 2,000 ponds and marshes.

== Archaeology ==
The archaeological sites in the area demonstrate some of the earliest human habitation in North America. More than 20,000 fossils have been collected in the area, including some never before reported in North America.

The Bluefish Caves, another important area with early human presence, are located about 75 km southwest of the Old Crow Flats.

== Fossils and artifacts ==
Many northern Yukon rivers, including Old Crow River and Porcupine River, changed course relatively recently, and cut through the fossil-bearing deposits. As a result, millions of fossils were eroded from the bluffs and redeposited in new riverbanks.

Many animals are represented in fossils uncovered in Old Crow Flats, including mammoths, mastodons, giant beavers, ground sloths, camels, horses, giant bison, short-faced bears, American lions, and short-faced skunks, among others. Mammoth bones radiocarbon dated between 25,000 and 40,000 years old display signs of human tool production and butchery.

== See also ==
- Vuntut Gwitchin First Nation
