= Indian River (Yukon) =

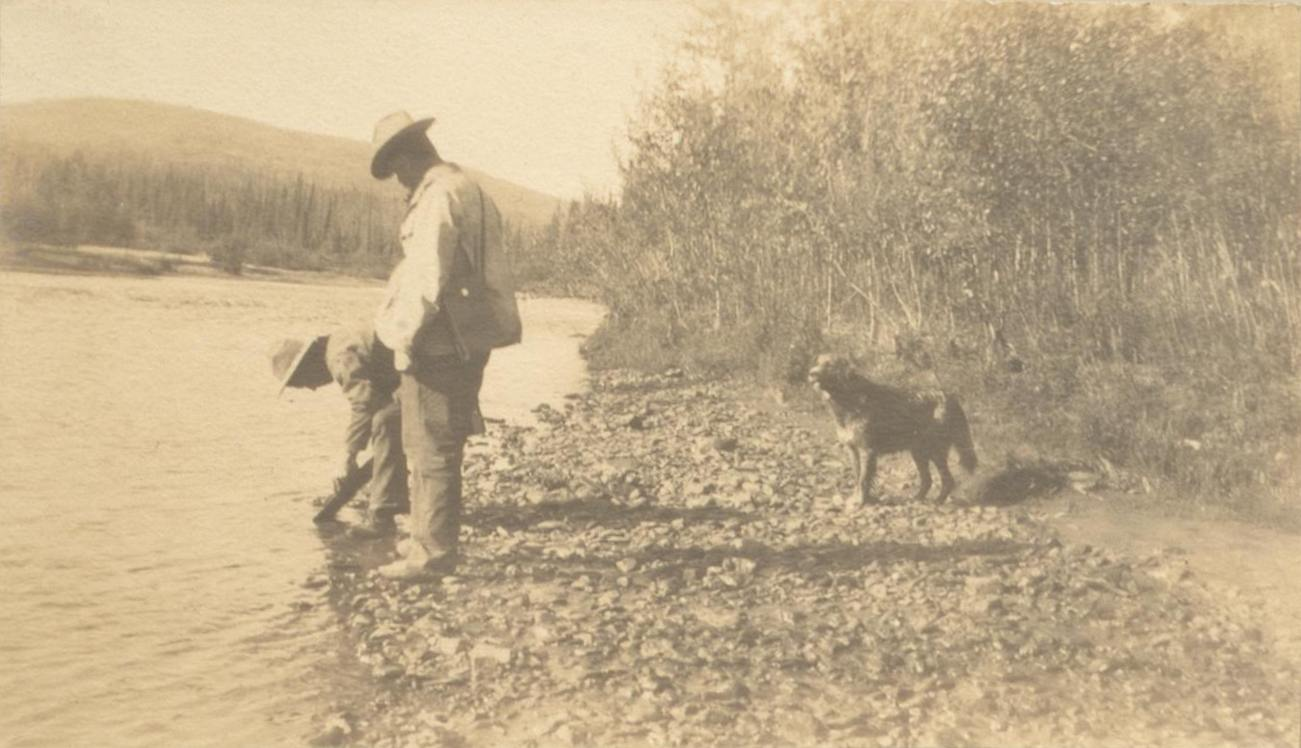
- Panning for gold on the Indian River, 1904; photo by Joseph Tyrrell, Thomas Fisher Rare Book Library

- Location of the mouth in Yukon

Location
- Country: Canada
- Territory: Yukon

Physical characteristics
- Source confluence: Australia Creek, Dominion Creek, Scribner Creek and Wounded Moose Creek
  - coordinates: 63°37′08″N 138°42′16″W
  - elevation: 487 m (1,598 ft)
- Mouth: Yukon River
  - coordinates: 63°47′08″N 139°43′39″W
  - elevation: 333 m (1,093 ft)

Basin features
- River system: Bering Sea drainage basin

The Indian River is a river in Yukon, Canada. It is in the Bering Sea drainage basin and is a right tributary of the Yukon River.

== Course ==
The river begins at the confluence of Australia Creek, Dominion Creek, Scribner Creek and Wounded Moose Creek, about 5 kilometres (3.1 mi) southwest of the settlement of Dominion. It flows northwest, then turns west to reach its mouth at the Yukon River.

== Geology ==
The river is a gravel-bed stream located south of Dawson City. It lies on the Klondike Plateau, and forms the southern boundary of the Yukon placer gold district. Indian River and its tributaries are the largest gold producers in the Yukon. In 2001, the river produced 119,999 grams (4,232.8 oz) of gold. In 2008, Klondike Star Mineral Corporation announced plans to further develop the gold resources of the river.

== Tributaries ==
- Bertha Creek (right)
- Nine Mile Creek (right)
- Ophir Creek (right)
- Ruby Creek (left)
- Quartz Creek (right)
- McKinnon Creek (left)
- New Zealand Creek (right)
- Montana Creek (left)
- Eureka Creek (left)

== See also ==
- List of rivers of Yukon
