= White River (Yukon) =

River in Yukon and Alaska

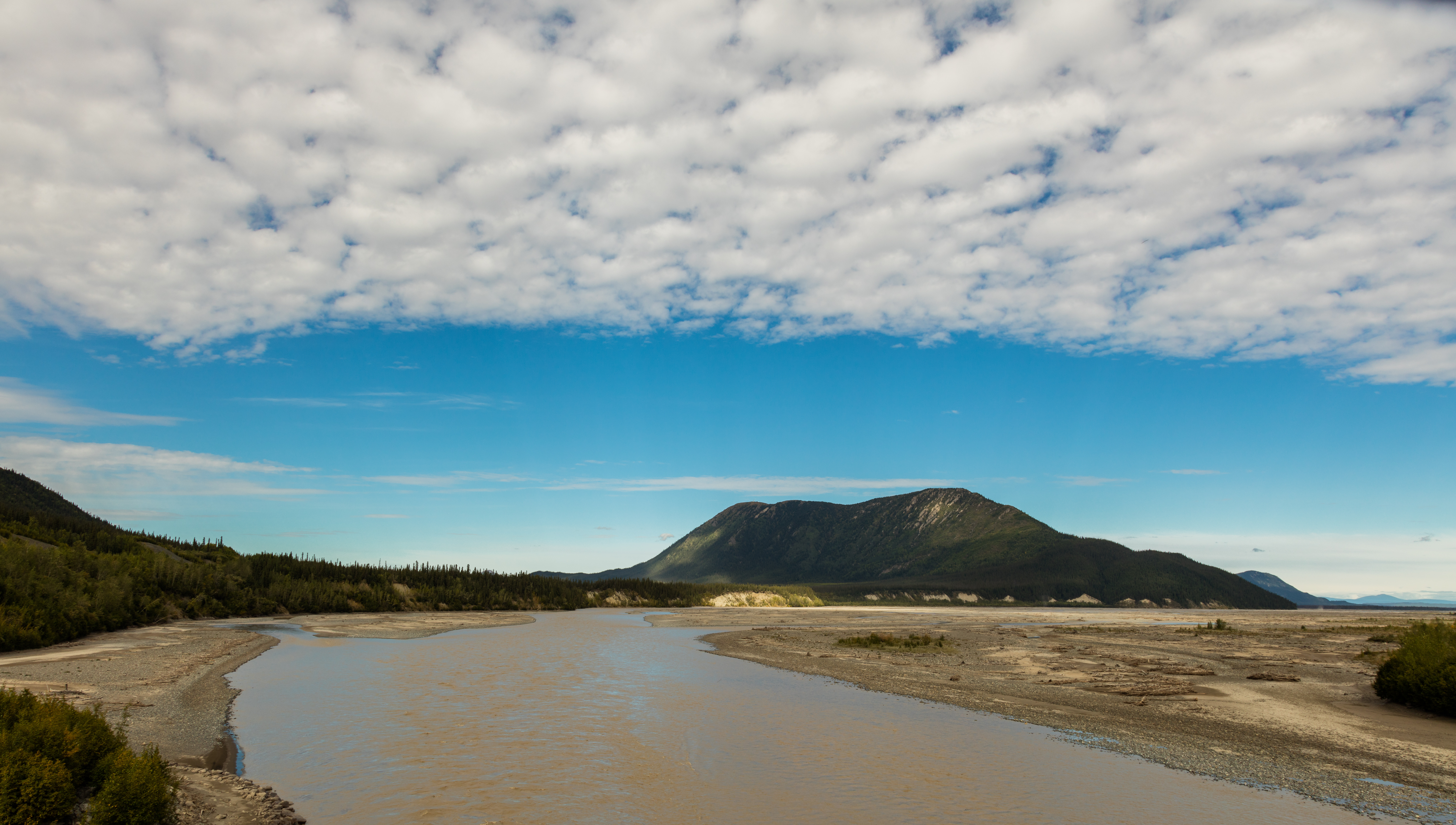
- White River near Beaver Creek, Yukon

- Location of the mouth of the White River in Yukon
- Native name: Tadzan ndek (Hän)

Location
- Countries: United States; Canada
- State/Territory: Alaska; Yukon
- Census Area: Valdez–Cordova in Alaska

Physical characteristics
- Source: Russell Glacier
  - location: Wrangell–St. Elias National Park and Preserve, Saint Elias Mountains, Alaska
  - coordinates: 61°40′18″N 141°50′01″W
  - elevation: 4,258 ft (1,298 m)
- Mouth: Yukon River
  - location: 12 miles (19 km) upstream of the mouth of the Stewart River, Yukon
  - coordinates: 63°11′24″N 139°35′23″W
  - elevation: 2,129 ft (649 m)
- Length: 200 mi (320 km)

The White River (French: Rivière Blanche; Hän: Tadzan ndek) is a tributary about 200 miles (320 km) long, of the Yukon River in the U.S. state of Alaska and the Canadian territory of Yukon. The Alaska Highway crosses the White River near Beaver Creek.

The White River is glacier-fed and contains large amounts of suspended sediment. It transports 19 million tons of sediment per year in the upper part of its basin. This dramatically changes the clarity of the Yukon River, which remains sediment laden from the confluence to its mouth.

== See also ==
- List of rivers of Alaska
- List of rivers of Yukon
