= Kandik River =

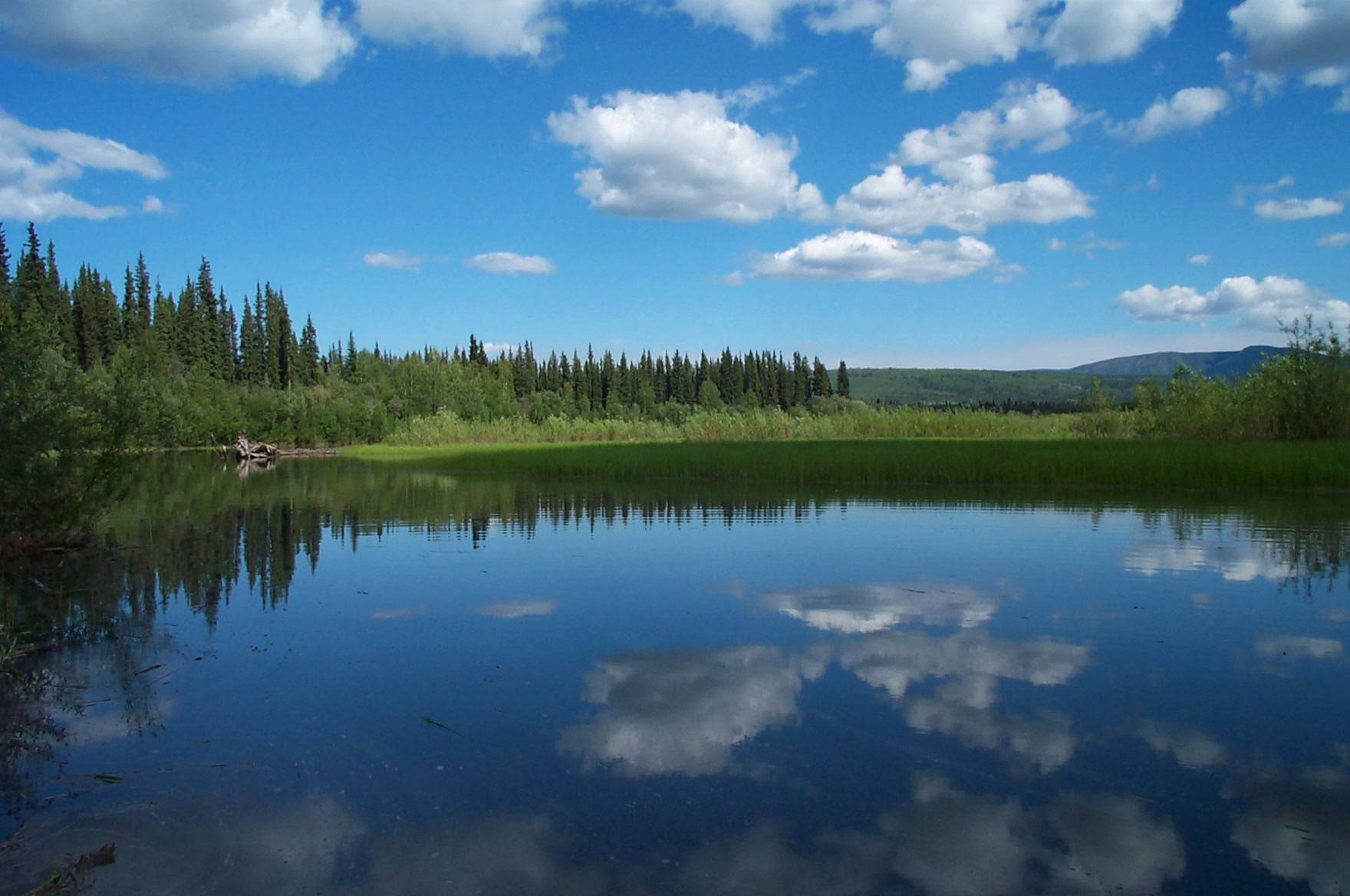
- Kandik River mouth

- Location of the mouth of the Kandik River in Alaska
- Native name: K'ày' juu (Hän)

Location
- Countries: Canada; United States
- Territories/States: Yukon; Alaska

Physical characteristics
- Source: Yukon
  - coordinates: 65°48′00″N 140°20′00″W
  - elevation: 3,767 ft (1,148 m)
- Mouth: Yukon River
  - location: 9 miles (14 km) northeast of the mouth of the Charley River, Southeast Fairbanks Census Area, Alaska
  - coordinates: 65°22′26″N 142°30′40″W
  - elevation: 715 ft (218 m)
- Length: 82 mi (132 km)

The Kandik River (Hän: K'ày' juu) is an 82-mile (132 km) tributary of the Yukon River in Canada and the United States. Beginning in the Canadian territory of Yukon, it flows generally southwest into the U.S. state of Alaska. Continuing southwest, it enters the larger river slightly upstream of the mouth of the Charley River in Yukon–Charley Rivers National Preserve.

== See also ==
- List of rivers of Alaska
- List of rivers of Yukon
