= Takhini River =

River in Yukon Territory, Canada

Coordinates: 60°50′29″N 135°10′55.99″W

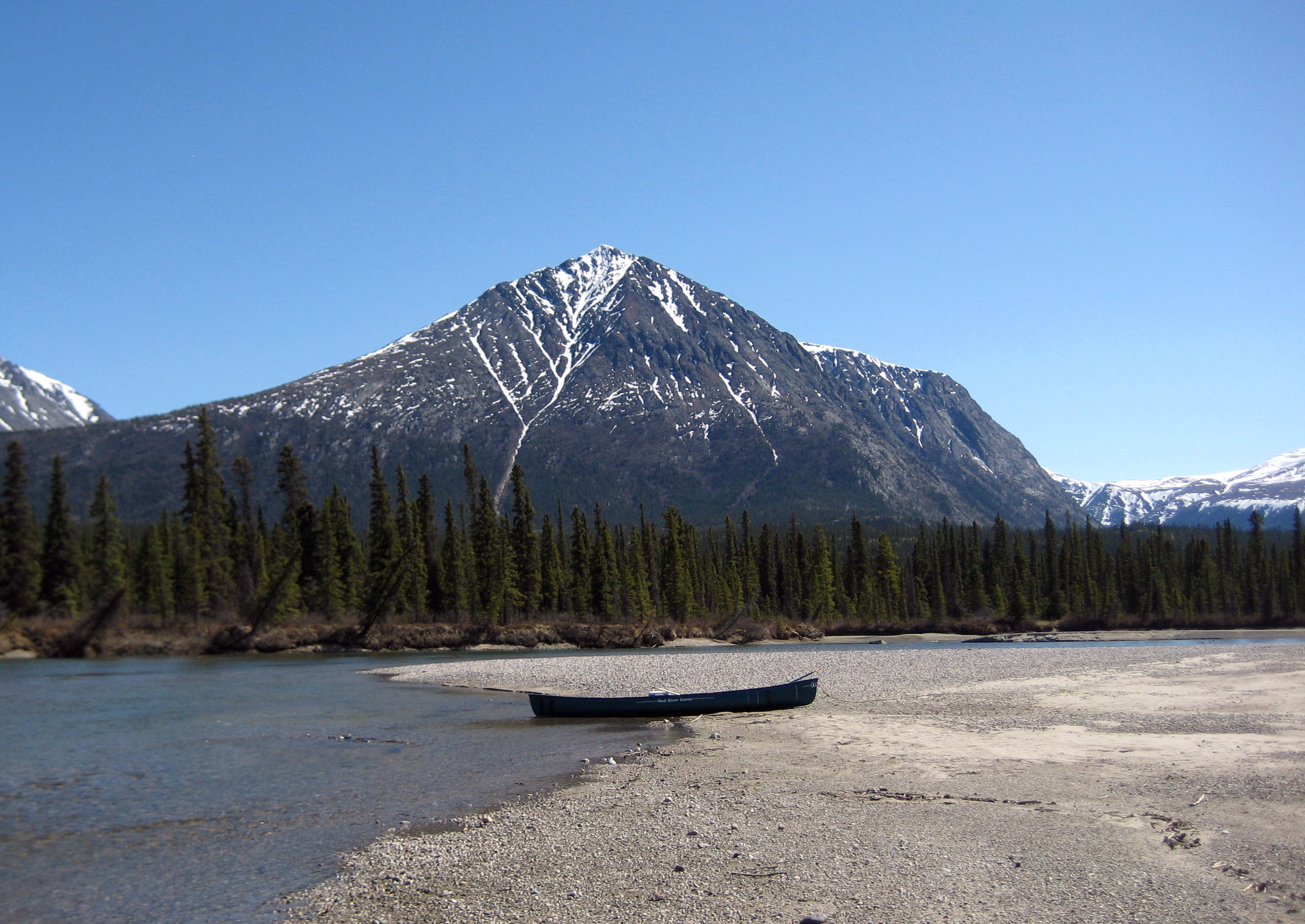
Takhini River

The Takhini River is a watercourse in Yukon, Canada. The river is located just north of Whitehorse, Yukon, and flows from west to east, meeting the Yukon River at a point between Whitehorse and Lake Laberge. During the winter, the river freezes and serves as part of the route of the Yukon Quest sled dog race.

The Alaska Highway parallels the Takhini River, and the Klondike Highway crosses it near its junction with the Yukon. The river is a popular tourist destination and particularly popular with kayakers and canoeists.

== See also ==
- List of rivers of Yukon
