= Bonnet Plume River =

River in Yukon, Canada

Coordinates: 65.9386°N 134.923°W

The Bonnet Plume River is one of Yukon's better-known rivers. It flows south to north, from a mountain lake source in the Bonnet Plume Range in the Mackenzie Mountains through several mountain ranges to its confluence with the Peel. It is very popular with outdoor enthusiasts as a canoe, kayak or rafting trip. There is large section of whitewater on the river where it passes through a rockslide canyon.

This river is very remote and is usually accessed by plane or helicopter. The Bonnet Plume was designated a Canadian Heritage River in 1998.

== See also ==
- List of rivers of Yukon
- Peel Watershed
