= McCabe Creek (Yukon) =

River in Yukon, Canada

Coordinates: 62°32′13″N 136°45′58″W

McCabe Creek is a river in Yukon Territory, Canada. A farm site on the creek was a checkpoint for the Yukon Quest sled dog race, but the checkpoint building burned down in 2009 and the site's future participation in the race is uncertain.

== See also ==
- List of rivers of Yukon
