= Rancheria River (Yukon) =

River in Canada

Coordinates: 60°13′21″N 129°08′40″W

The Rancheria River is a tributary of the Liard River in the southern Yukon Territory, Canada, just north of the border with British Columbia. The river's main tributary is the Little Rancheria River, which begins in British Columbia. Both river basins are in the northernmost of extension of the Stikine Ranges of the Cassiar Mountains, which extend from the Finlay River north to the Liard and end just inside the Yukon, with the Rancheria River forming the northern end of the range.

== See also ==
- List of rivers of Yukon
- Rancheria
- Rancherie
