= Little Rancheria River =

Watercourse in British Columbia and Yukon, Canada

Coordinates: 60°12′13″N 129°33′36″W

The Little Rancheria River is a tributary of the Rancheria River having its origin in the northernmost Stikine Ranges of British Columbia, Canada, and joining its parent stream in the Yukon Territory. The Rancheria is a tributary of the Liard and defines the northern limit of the Stikine Ranges and their parent range, the Cassiar Mountains. The river crosses the provincial-territorial boundary at 129° 48' 00" W.

== See also ==
- List of rivers of British Columbia
- List of rivers of Yukon
