= Wind River (Yukon) =

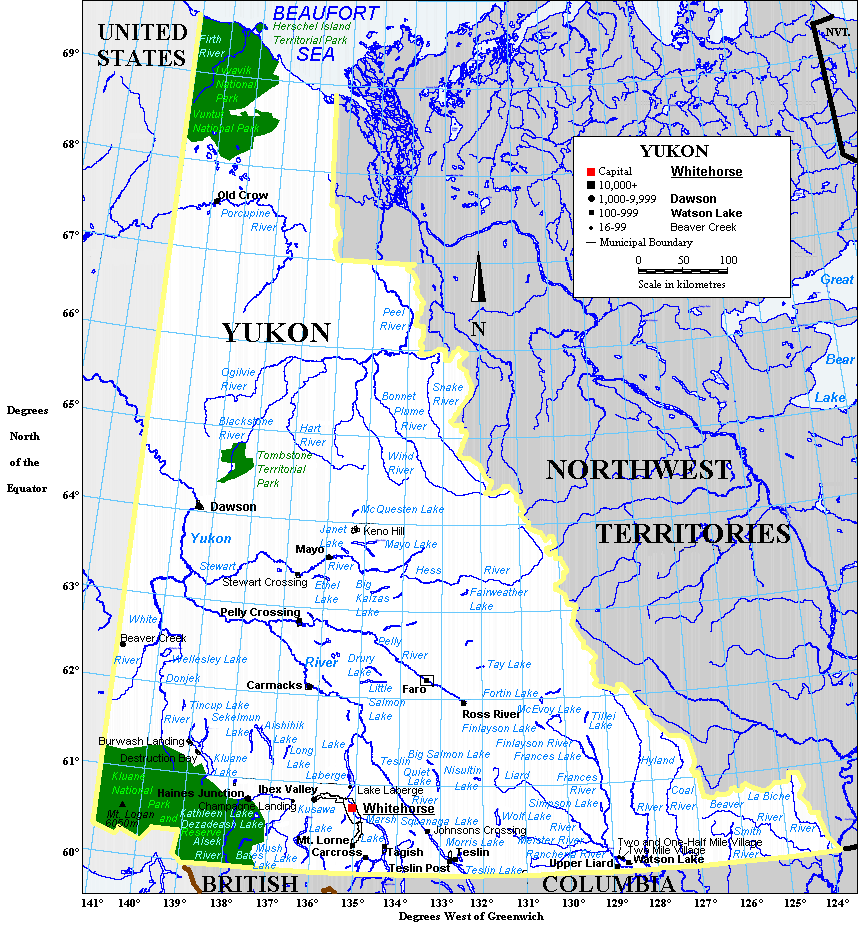
- Wind River is northeast of Dawson City

Location
- Country: Canada
- Territory: Yukon

Physical characteristics
- Mouth: Peel River
  - coordinates: 65°50′29″N 135°18′26″W
  - elevation: 647 ft (197 m)

The Wind River is a river in Yukon, part of the Peel River watershed. It lies to the west of the Bonnet Plume and Snake Rivers.

The river is only accessible by air, or by trekking overland, or along a winter road. The river is paddled several times a year by various private and guided groups. The river has numerous sets of Class I and Class II rapids, but is mostly flat water. In some parts the channel is very wide and braided with many sharp bends, and is occasionally very shallow. For paddling, the river is not too technical, but it does have short Class II rapids and areas where lining may be required at low water levels. Some paddling experience is a definite asset. Several companies offer guided trips down the Wind River.

== See also ==
- List of rivers of Yukon
- Peel Watershed
