= Beaver River (Stewart River tributary) =

Coordinates: 63°57′30″N 133°54′00″W

The Beaver River is a tributary of the Stewart River in Yukon Territory, Canada.

== See also ==
- List of rivers of Yukon
