= List of longest rivers of Canada =

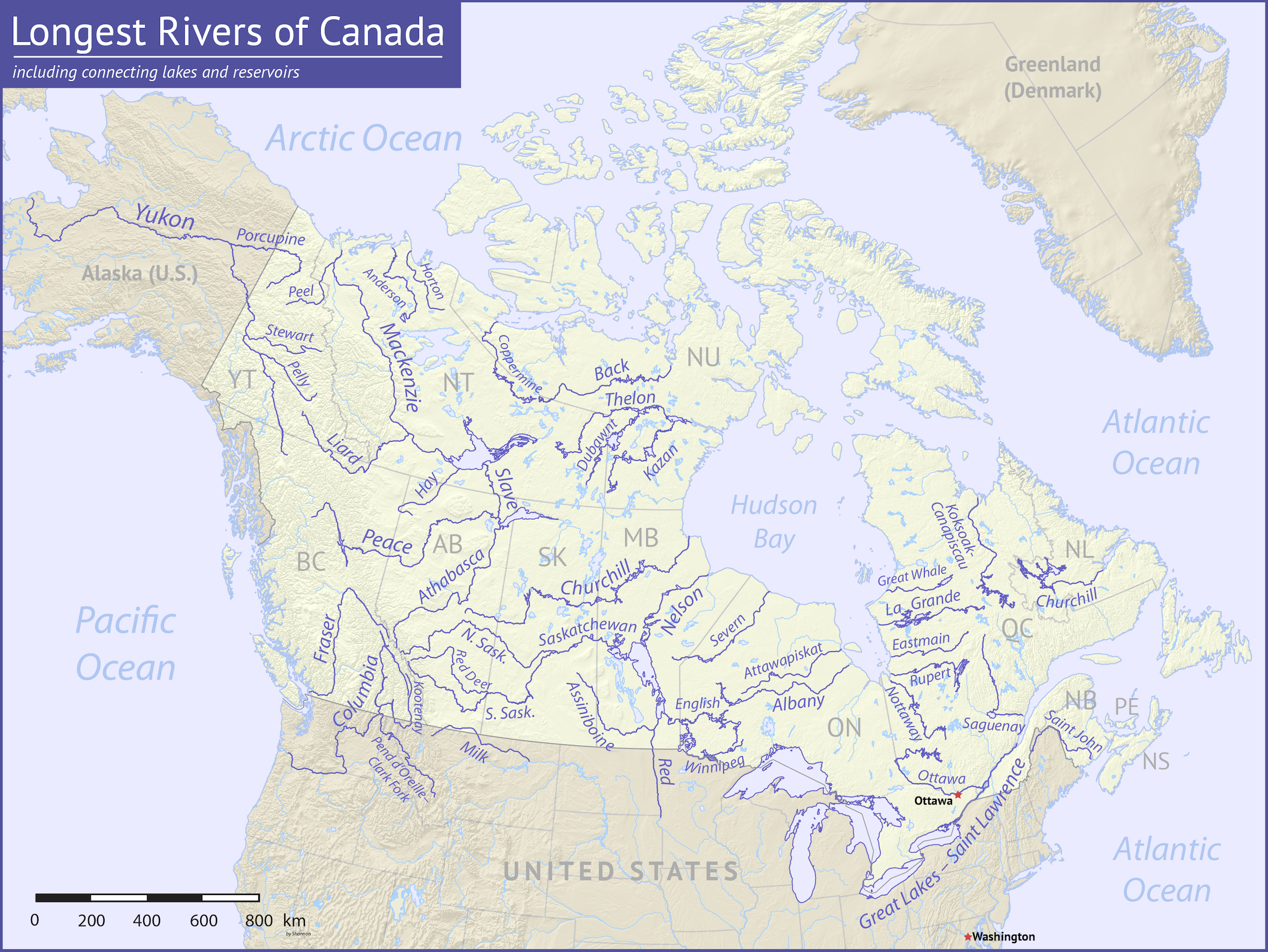
Rivers on this list shown on a map of Canada

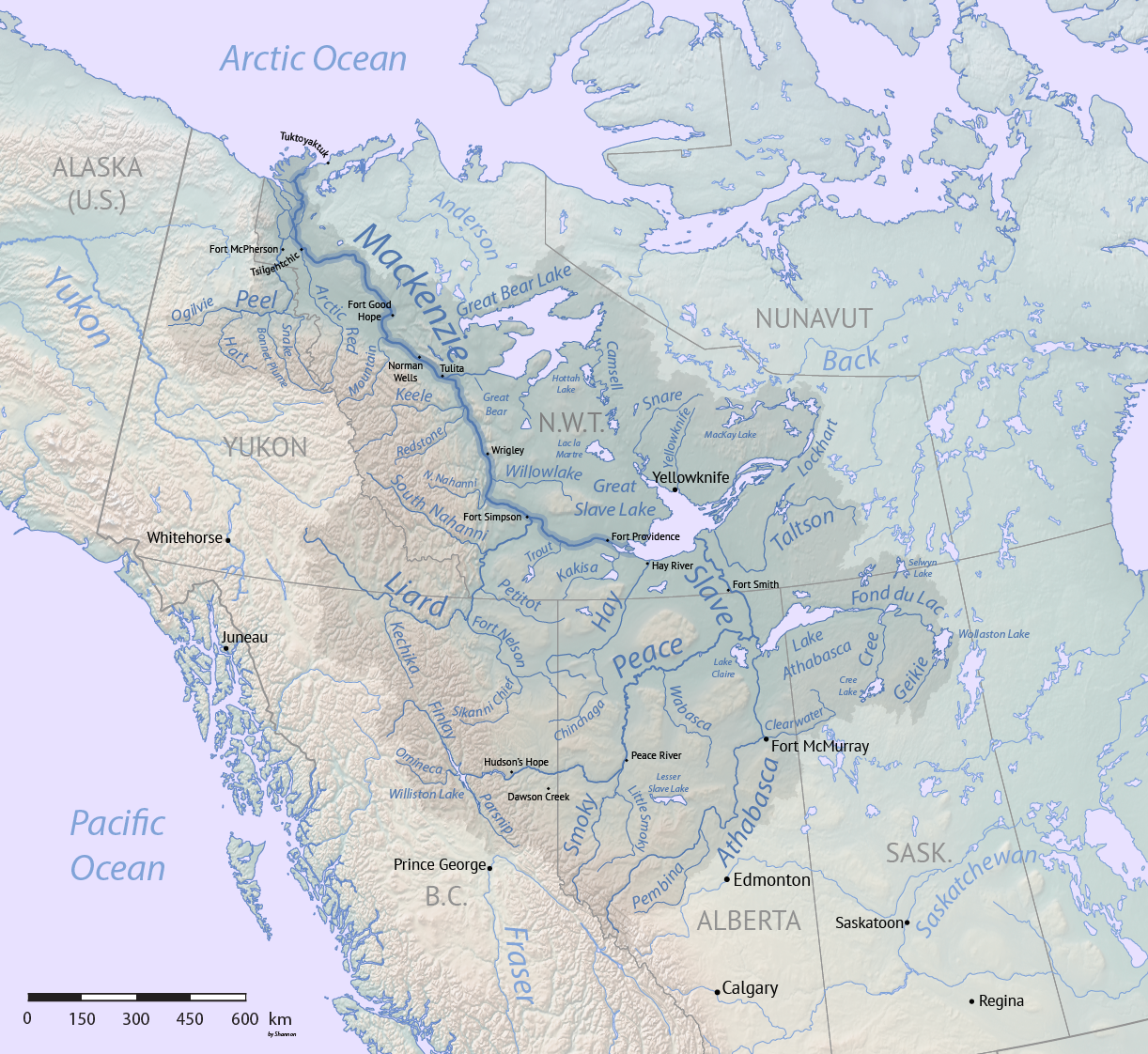
The Mackenzie River is the longest stream in Canada if measured from its mouth on the Beaufort Sea to the headwaters of the Finlay River, a major upstream tributary. The main stem, a much shorter segment of the Mackenzie, is marked in dark blue.

Among the longest rivers of Canada are 47 streams of at least 600 km (370 mi). In the case of some rivers such as the Columbia, the length listed in the table below is solely that of the main stem. In the case of others such as the Mackenzie, it is the combined lengths of the main stem and one or more upstream tributaries, as noted. Excluded from the list are rivers such as the Dauphin, a short connecting link between lakes Manitoba and Winnipeg, with main stems of 100 km (62 mi) or less. Also excluded are rivers such as the Mississippi, the main stems of which do not enter Canada even though some of their tributaries do.

Nine rivers in this list cross international boundaries or form them. Four—the Yukon, Columbia, Porcupine, and Kootenay—begin in Canada and flow into the United States. Five—the Milk, Pend d'Oreille, Saint Lawrence, Red, and Saint John—begin in the United States and flow into Canada. Of these, the Milk and the Kootenay cross the international border twice, the Milk leaving and then re-entering the United States, the Kootenay leaving and then re-entering Canada. The drainage basins of these nine rivers extend into both countries; in addition, the drainage basins of six others—the Fraser, Assiniboine, South Saskatchewan, Saskatchewan, Nelson, and Winnipeg—extend into the United States even though their main stems flow entirely within Canada.

Sources report hydrological quantities with varied precision. Biologist and author Ruth Patrick, describing a table of high-discharge rivers, wrote that data on discharge, drainage area, and length varied widely among authors whose works she consulted. "It seems", she said, "that the wisest course is to regard data tables such as the present one as showing the general ranks of rivers, and not to place too much importance on minor (10–20%) differences in figures."

== Table ==
The primary source for data in the table below is The Atlas of Canada; other sources are as noted. Discharge refers to the flow at the mouth except as noted. U.S. states appear in italics. Abbreviations are as follows: "km" for "kilometre", "mi" for "mile", "s" for "second", "m" for "metre", and "ft" for "foot".

Key
† River is not entirely within Canada.
‡ Watershed is not entirely within Canada.

Longest rivers of Canada
#	Name	Mouth	Length	Source (Note: Except as noted, source coordinates were derived via a topographic map search engine embedded in The Atlas of Canada.)	Watershed area	Discharge	Provinces, states	Image
1	Mackenzie River	Beaufort Sea; 69°21′59″N 133°54′10″W	4,241 km 2,635 mi (Note: To the head of the Finlay River.)	Thutade Lake; 56°44′00″N 127°31′00″W	1,805,200 km^{2} 697,000 mi^{2}	9,700 m^{3}/s 340,000 ft^{3}/s	Northwest Territories	A frozen river passes through flat country. Short trees grow on the riverbanks; tall mountains are in the far distance.
2	Yukon River	Bering Sea; 62°35′55″N 164°48′00″W	3,185 km 1,979 mi † (Note: To the head of the Nisutlin River. Of the total length of 3,185 km (1,979 mi), 1,149 km (714 mi) (about 36 percent) are in Canada.)	Teslin Lake; 59°37′00″N 132°09′00″W	839,200 km^{2} 324,000 mi^{2} ‡ (Note: Split between 323,800 km^{2} (125,000 mi^{2}), about 39 percent, in Canada and 515,400 km^{2} (199,000 mi^{2}), about 61 percent, in the United States.)	6,340 m^{3}/s 224,000 ft^{3}/s	British Columbia, Yukon, Alaska	Sunset over a large river flowing through mountains.
3	Saint Lawrence River	Gulf of Saint Lawrence; 49°40′00″N 64°30′00″W	3,058 km 1,900 mi † (Note: To the head of the Saint Louis River in Minnesota.)	Seven Beaver Lake; 47°30′04″N 91°49′51″W	1,344,200 km^{2} 519,000 mi^{2} ‡ (Note: Split between 839,200 km^{2} (324,000 mi^{2}) (about 62 percent) in Canada and 505,000 km^{2} (195,000 mi^{2}) (about 38 percent) in the United States.)	9,850 m^{3}/s 348,000 ft^{3}/s	Minnesota, Wisconsin, Ontario, Michigan, Ohio, New York, Quebec	A large ship travels along a large river bordered by vegetation on one bank and urban development on the other.
4	Nelson River	Hudson Bay; 57°04′05″N 92°30′08″W	2,575 km 1,600 mi (Note: To the head of the Bow River.)	Bow Glacier; 51°40′00″N 116°27′00″W	892,300 km^{2} 344,500 mi^{2} ‡ (Note: Split between 690,900 square kilometres (266,800 mi^{2}), about 77 percent, in Canada and 201,400 square kilometres (77,800 mi^{2}), about 23 percent, in the United States. The totals for the two countries were derived by adding the U.S. watershed subtotals for the Assiniboine, Red, Winnipeg, and Saskatchewan rivers, which feed into the Nelson.)	2,370 m^{3}/s 84,000 ft^{3}/s	Manitoba	Native people sit in canoes along the shore of a very wide flat river.
5	Slave River	Great Slave Lake; 61°18′00″N 113°40′04″W	2,338 km 1,453 mi (Note: Derived by adding the length of the Peace River (measured from its mouth to the headwaters of the Finlay River) to the length of the main stem of the Slave River.)	Thutade Lake; 56°44′00″N 127°31′00″W	616,400 km^{2} 238,000 mi^{2}	3,437 m^{3}/s 121,400 ft^{3}/s	Alberta, Northwest Territories	White birds with wide orange beaks swim near a rocky ledge of a swift wide river.
6	Columbia River	Pacific Ocean; 46°14′39″N 124°03′29″W	2,000 km 1,243 mi † (Note: About 801 km (498 mi), 40 percent of the total, are in Canada.)	Columbia Lake; 50°09′53″N 115°50′19″W	671,300 km^{2} 259,200 mi^{2} ‡ (Note: Split between 102,800 km^{2} (39,700 mi^{2}) (about 15 percent) in Canada and 568,500 km^{2} (219,500 mi^{2}) (about 85 percent) in the United States.)	7,730 m^{3}/s 273,000 ft^{3}/s	British Columbia, Washington, Oregon	A large river flows through a wooded gorge.
7	Saskatchewan River	Lake Winnipeg; 53°11′20″N 99°15′18″W	1,939 km 1,205 mi (Note: To the head of the Bow River.)	Bow Glacier; 51°40′00″N 116°27′00″W	335,900 km^{2} 129,700 mi^{2} ‡ (Note: Split between 334,100 km^{2} (129,000 mi^{2}) (about 99.5 percent) in Canada and 1,800 km^{2} (690 mi^{2}) (about 0.5 percent) in the United States.)	700 m^{3}/s 25,000 ft^{3}/s	Alberta, Saskatchewan, Manitoba	A wide river flows under a bridge.
8	Peace River	Slave River; 59°00′01″N 111°24′47″W	1,923 km 1,195 mi (Note: To the head of the Finlay River.)	Thutade Lake; 56°44′00″N 127°31′00″W	302,500 km^{2} 116,800 mi^{2}	2,118 m^{3}/s 74,800 ft^{3}/s	British Columbia, Alberta	Brilliant sunset over a wide river flowing through woods
9	Churchill River (Hudson Bay)	Hudson Bay; 58°47′45″N 94°12′15″W	1,609 km 1,000 mi (Note: To the head of Churchill Lake.)	Churchill Lake; 55°49′02″N 108°22′52″W	281,300 km^{2} 108,600 mi^{2}	1,200 m^{3}/s 42,000 ft^{3}/s	Alberta, Saskatchewan, Manitoba	A medium-sized river rushes through rapids in the woods.
10	South Saskatchewan River	Saskatchewan River; 53°15′00″N 105°05′02″W	1,392 km 865 mi (Note: To the head of the Bow River.)	Bow Glacier; 51°40′00″N 116°27′00″W	146,100 km^{2} 56,400 mi^{2} ‡ (Note: Split between 144,300 km^{2} (55,700 mi^{2}) (about 99 percent) in Canada and 1,800 km^{2} (690 mi^{2}) (about 1 percent) in the United States.)	280 m^{3}/s 9,900 ft^{3}/s	Alberta, Saskatchewan	The surface of a wide river approaching a city is almost completely frozen.
11	Fraser River	Strait of Georgia; 49°07′00″N 123°10′59″W	1,375 km 854 mi	Fraser Pass; 52°32′01″N 118°19′39″W	233,100 km^{2} 90,000 mi^{2} ‡ (Note: Split between 232,300 km^{2} (89,700 mi^{2}) (about 99.7 percent) in Canada and 800 km^{2} (310 mi^{2}) (about 0.3 percent) in the United States.)	3,540 m^{3}/s 125,000 ft^{3}/s	British Columbia	Men in canoes descend wild rapids in a river canyon.
12	North Saskatchewan River	Saskatchewan River; 53°15′00″N 105°05′02″W	1,287 km 800 mi	Saskatchewan Glacier; 52°14′33″N 117°09′05″W	122,800 km^{2} 47,400 mi^{2}	245 m^{3}/s 8,700 ft^{3}/s	Alberta, Saskatchewan	A wide river winds by a fenced overlook opposite a forest. The setting sun illuminates a partly cloudy sky.
13	Ottawa River	Saint Lawrence River; 45°33′59″N 74°23′11″W	1,271 km 790 mi	Laurentian Mountains; 47°36′00″N 75°43′40″W	146,300 km^{2} 56,500 mi^{2}	1,950 m^{3}/s 69,000 ft^{3}/s	Quebec, Ontario	A dock extends from the shore of an extremely wide river.
14	Athabasca River	Lake Athabasca; 58°59′05″N 110°51′23″W	1,231 km 765 mi	Columbia Icefield; 52°11′14″N 117°28′27″W	95,300 km^{2} 36,800 mi^{2} (Note: Rivers of North America lists a basin size of 154,880 square kilometres (59,800 mi^{2}), but this includes Lake Athabasca, the Peace–Athabasca Delta, and the basins of the Fond du Lac River and some of the other streams flowing into the lake.)	783 m^{3}/s 27,700 ft^{3}/s	Alberta	A river flows by a cliff and through a snow-covered forest.
15	Liard River	Mackenzie River; 61°50′55″N 121°18′35″W	1,115 km 693 mi	Saint Cyr Range; 61°11′08″N 131°45′36″W	277,100 km^{2} 107,000 mi^{2}	2,446 m^{3}/s 86,400 ft^{3}/s	Yukon, British Columbia, Northwest Territories	A wide flat river flows along a rocky shore toward a mountain range in the far distance.
16	Assiniboine River	Red River; 49°53′09″N 97°07′41″W	1,070 km 660 mi	near Hazel Dell; 52°15′53″N 103°08′48″W	182,000 km^{2} 70,000 mi^{2} ‡ (Note: Split between 160,600 km^{2} (62,000 mi^{2}) (about 88 percent) in Canada and 21,400 km^{2} (8,300 mi^{2}) (about 12 percent) in the United States.)	45 m^{3}/s 1,600 ft^{3}/s	Saskatchewan, Manitoba	A muddy river floods a wooded urban area with boat docks and riverside seating.
17	Milk River	Missouri River; 48°03′26″N 106°19′07″W	1,005 km 625 mi † (Note: According to the Milk River Watershed Council, a 180-km (110 mi) stretch of the river flows through Canada. This amounts to about 18 percent of the river's total length.)	Blackfeet Indian Reservation; 48°51′20″N 113°01′10″W	61,200 km^{2} 23,600 mi^{2} ‡ (Note: Split between 21,600 km^{2} (8,300 mi^{2}) (about 35 percent) in Canada and 39,600 km^{2} (15,300 mi^{2}) (about 65 percent) in the United States.)	18.9 m^{3}/s 670 ft^{3}/s	Alberta, Montana	A small river winds through a rocky, grass-covered plateau. Hills rise in the distance.
18	Albany River	James Bay; 52°17′00″N 81°30′59″W	982 km 610 mi (Note: To the head of the Cat River.)	Cat Lake; 51°45′00″N 91°53′00″W	135,200 km^{2} 52,200 mi^{2}	251 m^{3}/s 8,900 ft^{3}/s (Note: Based on data from the years 1968–69, 73, and 75–84 at Hat Island, about 200 kilometres (120 mi) from the mouth. Distance from mouth estimated with a measurement tool embedded in The Atlas of Canada topographic maps.)	Ontario	Large trucks, widely spaced, travel single-file across a frozen river.
19	Severn River	Hudson Bay; 56°03′22″N 87°34′36″W	982 km 610 mi (Note: To the head of the Black Birch River.)	Deer Lake; 52°37′00″N 94°40′00″W	102,800 km^{2} 39,700 mi^{2}	645 m^{3}/s 22,800 ft^{3}/s (Note: Based on data from the years 1973–74, 77–79, and 83–84 at Limestone Rapids, about 40 kilometres (25 mi) from the mouth.)	Ontario	
20	Back River	Chantrey Inlet; 67°16′00″N 95°15′00″W	974 km 605 mi (Note: To the head of Muskox Lake.)	near Aylmer Lake; 64°25′00″N 108°27′00″W	106,500 km^{2} 41,120 mi^{2}	612 m^{3}/s 21,600 ft^{3}/s	Northwest Territories, Nunavut	
21	Thelon River	Baker Lake; 64°16′30″N 96°04′35″W	904 km 562 mi	Lynx Lake; 62°20′36″N 106°02′18″W	142,400 km^{2} 55,000 mi^{2}	840 m^{3}/s 30,000 ft^{3}/s	Northwest Territories, Nunavut	A wide river flows slowly through a forest of short, widely spaced evergreen trees.
22	La Grande River	James Bay; 53°50′03″N 79°03′20″W	893 km 555 mi	Lac Nichicun; 53°12′30″N 70°56′00″W	97,600 km^{2} 37,700 mi^{2}	1,690 m^{3}/s 60,000 ft^{3}/s	Quebec	Sunset over a river winding through thick evergreen forests.
23	Red River	Lake Winnipeg; 50°23′47″N 96°48′39″W	890 km 545 mi † (Note: Split between 255 kilometres (158 mi) or about 29 percent in Canada and 635 kilometres (395 mi) or about 71 percent in the United States.)	Wahpeton and Breckinridge; 46°15′52″N 96°35′55″W	287,500 km^{2} 111,000 mi^{2} ‡ (Note: Split between 138,600 km^{2} (53,500 mi^{2}) (about 48 percent) in Canada and 148,900 km^{2} (57,500 mi^{2}) (about 52 percent) in the United States.)	236 m^{3}/s 8,300 ft^{3}/s	North Dakota, Minnesota, Manitoba	A small river flows through a prairie landscape; brown grasses and leafless trees line the banks.
24	Koksoak River	Ungava Bay; 58°32′11″N 68°09′29″W	874 km 543 mi (Note: To the head of the Caniapiscau River.)	Lake Sevestre; 52°32′23″N 68°01′15″W	133,400 km^{2} 51,500 mi^{2}	2,800 m^{3}/s 99,000 ft^{3}/s	Quebec	
25	Churchill River (Atlantic)	Lake Melville; 53°20′58″N 60°10′39″W	856 km 532 mi (Note: To the head of the Ashuanipi River.)	Ashuanipi Lake; 52°59′20″N 66°14′28″W	79,800 km^{2} 30,800 mi^{2}	1,580 m^{3}/s 56,000 ft^{3}/s	Newfoundland and Labrador	
26	Coppermine River	Coronation Gulf; 67°49′09″N 115°03′50″W	845 km 525 mi	Lac de Gras; 64°35′02″N 111°11′24″W	50,800 km^{2} 19,600 mi^{2}	262 m^{3}/s 9,300 ft^{3}/s (Note: This is the mean discharge for a point about 100 kilometres (62 mi) from the mouth rather than at the mouth.)	Northwest Territories, Nunavut	Canoes and tents rest on a sandy spit along a river.
27	Dubawnt River	Thelon River; 64°32′59″N 100°06′00″W	842 km 523 mi	Abitau Lake; 60°21′00″N 107°09′00″W	57,500 km^{2} 22,200 mi^{2}	366 m^{3}/s 12,900 ft^{3}/s (Note: Measured by a gauge at the outlet of Marjorie Lake, about 50 kilometres (31 mi) from the mouth. Flow derived by converting km^{3}/yr to m^{3}/s. Distance from mouth estimated with a measurement tool embedded in The Atlas of Canada topographic maps.)	Northwest Territories, Nunavut	
28	Winnipeg River	Lake Winnipeg; 50°37′54″N 96°19′13″W	813 km 505 mi (Note: To the head of the Firesteel River.)	Trap Lake; 49°12′42″N 90°26′58″W	135,800 km^{2} 52,400 mi^{2} ‡ (Note: Split between 106,500 square kilometres (41,100 mi^{2}) in Canada, about 78 percent, and 29,300 square kilometres (11,300 mi^{2}), about 22 percent, in the United States.)	850 m^{3}/s 30,000 ft^{3}/s	Ontario, Manitoba	Men in canoes approach a tent encampment along a wide river.
29	Kootenay River	Columbia River; 49°19′0″N 117°39′0″W	780 km 485 mi †	Beaverfoot Range; 51°03′21″N 116°21′55″W	50,300 km^{2} 19,400 mi^{2} ‡ (Note: Split between 37,700 square kilometres (14,600 mi^{2}), about 52 percent, in Canada and 12,600 square kilometres (4,900 mi^{2}), about 48 percent, in the United States.)	850 m^{3}/s 30,000 ft^{3}/s	British Columbia, Montana, Idaho	A river flows through forested hills.
30	Nottaway River	James Bay; 51°22′33″N 78°55′45″W	776 km 482 mi (Note: To the head of the Megiscane River.)	Lake Gilles; 48°07′00″N 75°38′00″W	65,800 km^{2} 25,400 mi^{2}	1,190 m^{3}/s 42000 ft^{3}/s	Quebec	
31	Rupert River	James Bay; 51°29′35″N 78°45′01″W	763 km 474 mi (Note: To the head of the Temiscamie River.)	north of Lake Mistassini; 52°13′11″N 71°32′19″W	43,400 km^{2} 16,800 mi^{2}	900 m^{3}/s 32,000 ft^{3}/s	Quebec	A medium-sized river plunges down rapids surrounded by forests.
32	Eastmain River	James Bay; 52°14′30″N 78°33′38″W	756 km 470 mi	Lac Bréhat; 52°31′30″N 70°52′00″W	46,400 km^{2} 17,900 mi^{2}	930 m^{3}/s 33,000 ft^{3}/s	Quebec	A frozen river winds through a snowy forest.
33	Attawapiskat River	James Bay; 52°57′12″N 82°17′43″W	748 km 465 mi (Note: To the head of Attawapiskat Lake.)	Attawapiskat Lake; 52°10′00″N 87°37′00″W	50,500 km^{2} 19,500 mi^{2}	263 m^{3}/s 9,300 ft^{3}/s (Note: Based on data from the years 1967–80 and 82–84 at the source, Attawpiskat Lake, rather than at the mouth.)	Ontario	
34	Kazan River	Thelon River; 64°02′30″N 95°29′04″W	732 km 455 mi (Note: To the head of Ennadai Lake.)	Ennadai Lake; 60°55′00″N 101°20′00″W	71,500 km^{2} 27,600 mi^{2}	540 m^{3}/s 19,000 ft^{3}/s	Nunavut	
35	Red Deer River	South Saskatchewan River; 50°58′05″N 110°00′00″W	724 km 450 mi	Sawback Range; 51°32′19″N 116°02′46″W	45,100 km^{2} 17,400 mi^{2}	70 m^{3}/s 2,500 ft^{3}/s	Alberta	A suspension bridge crosses a wide river.
36	Great Whale River	Hudson Bay; 55°15′58″N 77°47′04″W	724 km 450 mi	Lake Saint-Lusson; 54°49′30″N 70°32′17″W	42,700 km^{2} 16,500 mi^{2}	680 m^{3}/s 24,000 ft^{3}/s	Quebec	
37	Porcupine River	Yukon River; 66°35′42″N 145°18′32″W	721 km 448 mi †	Ogilvie Mountains; 66°32′10″N 138°22′16″W	117,900 km^{2} 45,500 mi^{2} ‡ (Note: Split between 61,400 square kilometres (23,700 mi^{2}) in Canada, about 52 percent, and 56,500 square kilometres (21,800 mi^{2}), about 48 percent, in the United States.)	414 m^{3}/s 14,600 ft^{3}/s	Yukon, Alaska	A wide river curves by a rocky shore and across a flat plain.
38	Pend d'Oreille River	Columbia River; 48°59′59″N 117°37′00″W	703 km 437 mi † (Note: To the head of the Silver Bow Creek. Length derived by adding the distance from the mouth to the head of Pend Oreille Lake, shown on topo maps as about 220 kilometres (140 mi) to the length (about 480 kilometres (300 mi) of the Clark Fork River and its headwater tributary, Silver Bow Creek. Of this total, only 22 km (14 mi), about 3 percent, are in Canada.)	near Butte; 46°04′32″N 112°27′56″W	66,900 km^{2} 25,800 mi^{2} ‡ (Note: Split between 1,600 square kilometres (620 mi^{2}) in Canada, about 2 percent, and 65,000 square kilometres (25,000 mi^{2}), about 98 percent, in the United States.)	820 m^{3}/s 29,000 ft^{3}/s	Idaho, Washington, British Columbia	A two-part dam, connected in the middle by an island, blocks a large river downstream of a railroad bridge.
39	Hay River	Great Slave Lake; 60°51′50″N 115°44′04″W	702 km 436 mi	near Zama Lake; 58°14′14″N 118°51′34″W	48,200 km^{2} 18,600 mi^{2}	113 m^{3}/s 4,000 ft^{3}/s	Alberta, Northwest Territories	A medium-sized river flows in bright sunlight through a forest.
40	Saguenay River	Saint Lawrence River; 48°07′59″N 69°43′59″W	698 km 434 mi (Note: To the head of the Peribonka River.)	near Otish Mountains; 52°16′17″N 70°48′38″W	88,000 km^{2} 34,000 mi^{2}	1,750 m^{3}/s 62,000 ft^{3}/s	Quebec	A very wide river flows between low lines of hills.
41	Anderson River	Beaufort Sea; 69°43′00″N 129°00′09″W	692 km 430 mi	northwest of Great Bear Lake; 66°57′00″N 124°36′00″W		142 m^{3}/s 5,000 ft^{3}/s (Note: Measured by a gauge below the Carnwath River, about 150 kilometres (93 mi) from the Anderson River mouth. Flow derived by converting km^{3}/yr to m^{3}/s. Distance from mouth estimated with a measurement tool embedded in The Atlas of Canada topographic maps.)	Northwest Territories	
42	Peel River	Mackenzie River; 67°41′49″N 134°31′58″W	684 km 425 mi (Note: To the head of the Ogilvie River.)	Gill Lake; 65°19′00″N 139°49′00″W	73,600 km^{2} 28,400 mi^{2}	103 m^{3}/s 3,600 ft^{3}/s	Yukon, Northwest Territories	
43	Saint John River	Bay of Fundy; 45°16′00″N 66°04′00″W	673 km 418 mi †	Somerset County; 46°33′47″N 69°53′05″W	55,200 km^{2} 21,300 mi^{2} ‡ (Note: Split between 35,000 square kilometres (14,000 mi^{2}) (about 63 percent) in Canada and 19,700 square kilometres (7,600 mi^{2}) (about 37 percent) in the United States.)	1,130 m^{3}/s 40,000 ft^{3}/s	Maine, New Brunswick	A flooding river has inundated roads, trees, and an elegant building.
44	Stewart River	Yukon River; 63°17′30″N 139°24′42″W	644 km 400 mi	Selwyn Mountains; 64°06′35″N 131°42′25″W	51,000 km^{2} 20,000 mi^{2}	675 m^{3}/s 23,800 ft^{3}/s	Yukon	A wide river flows through hills. A sign in the foreground says "Stewart River".
45	Horton River	Franklin Bay; 69°56′00″N 126°48′09″W	618 km 384 mi	Kitikmeot Region, Nunavut; 67°51′00″N 120°33′00″W	26,680 km^{2} 10,300 mi^{2}		Nunavut, Northwest Territories	A big river winds across a plain near a bluff.
46	English River	Winnipeg River; 50°12′04″N 95°00′12″W	615 km 382 mi	near Marmion Lake; 49°06′00″N 91°16′00″W	52,300 km^{2} 20,200 mi^{2}		Ontario	
47	Pelly River	Yukon River; 62°46′46″N 137°20′13″W	608 km 378 mi	Mackenzie Mountains; 62°49′00″N 129°53′00″W	51,000 km^{2} 20,000 mi^{2}	410 m^{3}/s 14,000 ft^{3}/s	Yukon	A wide river winds through a forest and by a town.

== See also ==
- List of rivers of Canada

== Notes and references ==
Notes

== Works cited ==
- Benke, Arthur C., ed., and Cushing, Colbert E., ed. Rivers of North America. Burlington, Massachusetts: Elsevier Academic Press. ISBN 0-12-088253-1
