= Kluane Lake =

Lake in Yukon, Canada

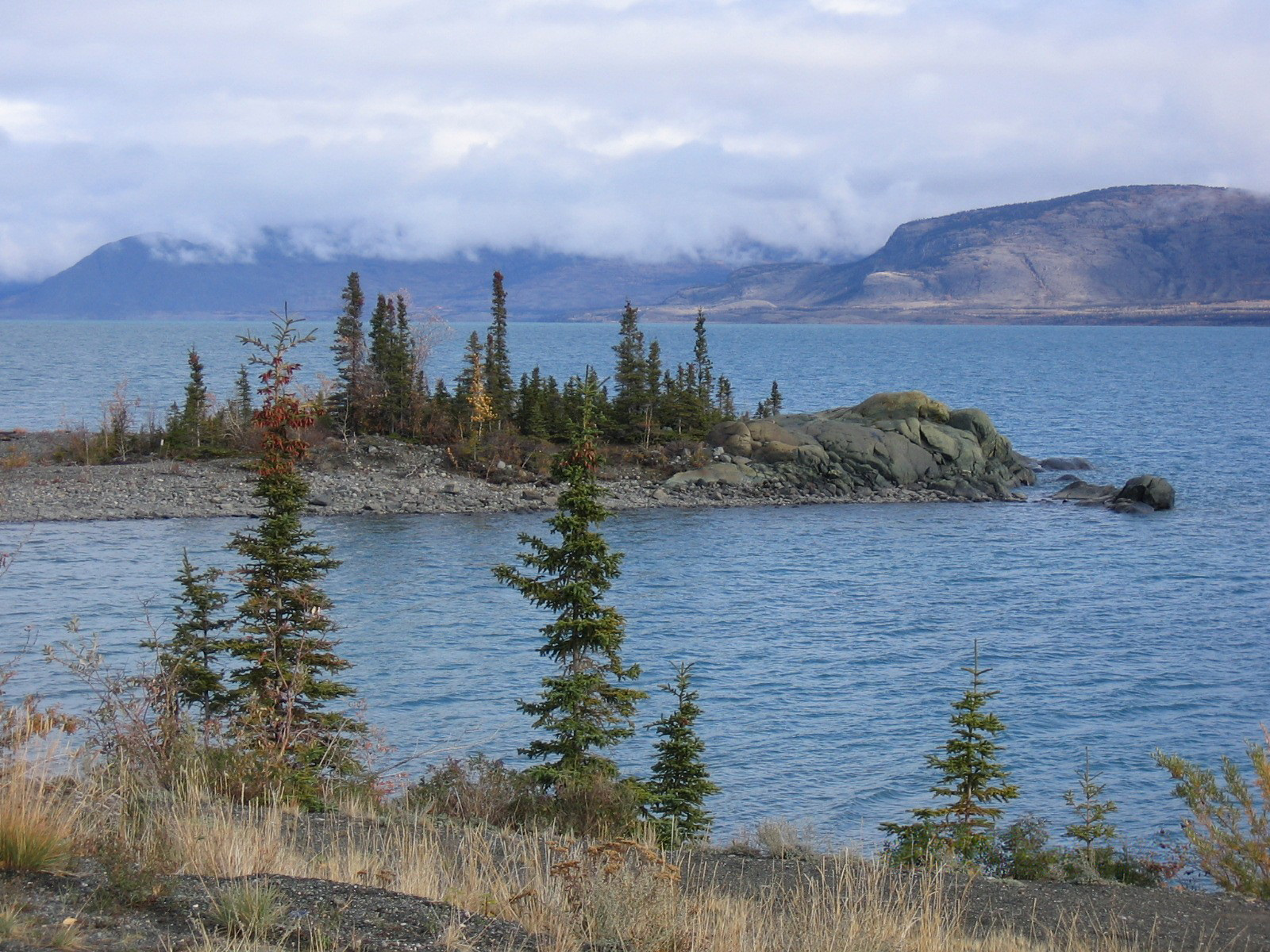

- Location within Canada Location within Yukon Location within Canada
- Interactive map of Kluane Lake
- Location: Yukon
- Coordinates: 61°15′50″N 138°44′40″W
- Primary inflows: Formerly the Slims River
- Primary outflows: Kluane River
- Catchment area: Bering Sea Watershed
- Basin countries: Canada
- Max. length: 81 km (50 mi)
- Surface area: c. 408 km^{2} (158 sq mi)
- Average depth: 31 m (102 ft)
- Max. depth: 91 m (299 ft)
- Surface elevation: 781 m (2,562 ft)
- Settlements: Burwash Landing, Destruction Bay

Kluane Lake is located in the southwest area of Yukon. It is the largest lake contained entirely within Yukon with an area of approximately 408 km^{2} (158 sq mi), and a length of 81 km (50 mi).

Kluane Lake is located approximately 60 km (37 mi) northwest of Haines Junction. The Alaska Highway follows most of the south side of Kluane Lake and offers lake views. The lake has a mean depth of 31 m (102 ft) and a maximum depth of 91 m (299 ft).

It is situated within the Kluane First Nation and White River First Nation territories, adjacent to the traditional territory of the Champagne and Aishihik First Nations.

== Climate change ==
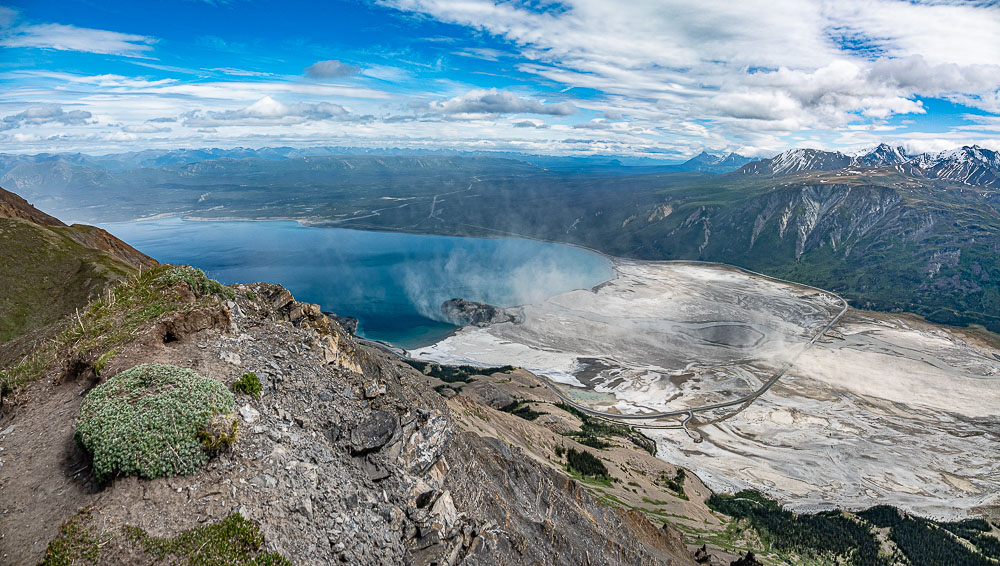
Climate change: Kluane Lake's main tributary (the A'ay Chu, or Slims River) has mostly dried since the retreating Kaskawulsh Glacier's meltwater suddenly diverted in May 2016

Until 2016, Kluane Lake was fed by the A'ay Chu (Slims River), which was composed of meltwater from the Kaskawulsh Glacier, located within Kluane National Park and Reserve. Kluane Lake drains into the Kluane River, whose waters flow into the Donjek River, White River, Yukon River, and eventually the Bering Sea. The lake has a high density of large-bodied lake trout and whitefish, but both commercial and recreational fish have decreased over the years.

In a case of climate change, over a period of four days in May 2016, the Slims River suddenly disappeared, leaving windswept mud flats where the Alaska Highway crosses the diminished inlet. Voluminous glacial meltwaters were suddenly diverted from one side of North America to another — from the Bering Sea to the Gulf of Alaska. The meltwater found a lower, easier path south - from the Kaskawulsh Glacier into the Kaskawulsh River, then the Alsek River, then into the Gulf of Alaska (north of the Pacific Ocean). With its main water supply cut off, Kluane Lake will likely become an isolated basin within a few years, shrinking below its outlet (the Kluane River). Lack of inflow is rapidly changing the water chemistry and fish populations of Kluane Lake. Clouds of dust now frequently fill the formerly clear air.

For the last 300 years until 2016, abundant meltwater from the Kaskawulsh Glacier has been channelled by ice dams to drain via the 150-metre (490 ft) wide Slims River northwards into Kluane Lake. Between 1956 and 2007, the Kaskawulsh glacier retreated by 655 m (2,149 ft), which most scientists attribute to human-caused climate change. Meltwater flooding from accelerating retreat in 2016 carved a new channel through a large ice field, diverting most flows into the Kaskawulsh River, a tributary of the Alsek, which flows into the Gulf of Alaska.

== Communities ==
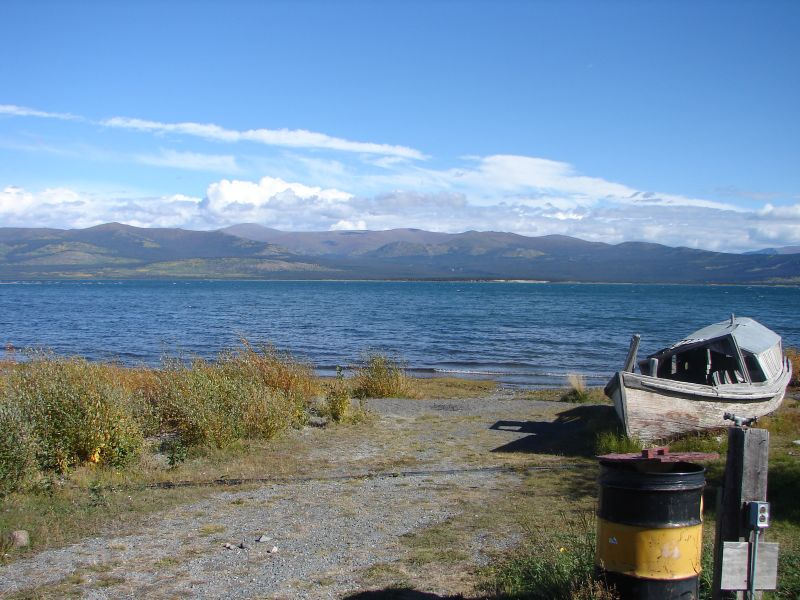
Burwash Landing on the shore of Kluane Lake

The Yukon communities of Burwash Landing and Destruction Bay are located on the western shore of the lake.

== Northern Mountain Caribou ==
The Aishihik and Kluane caribou herds migrate in the area surrounding Kluane and Aishihik Lakes. They are a northern mountain caribou, a distinct ecotype of the woodland caribou. In 2009, there were 181 caribou in the Kluane herd (also known as the Burwash herd) and 2,044 caribou in the Aishihik herd. The Kluane herd was declining while the Aishihik herd was increasing.

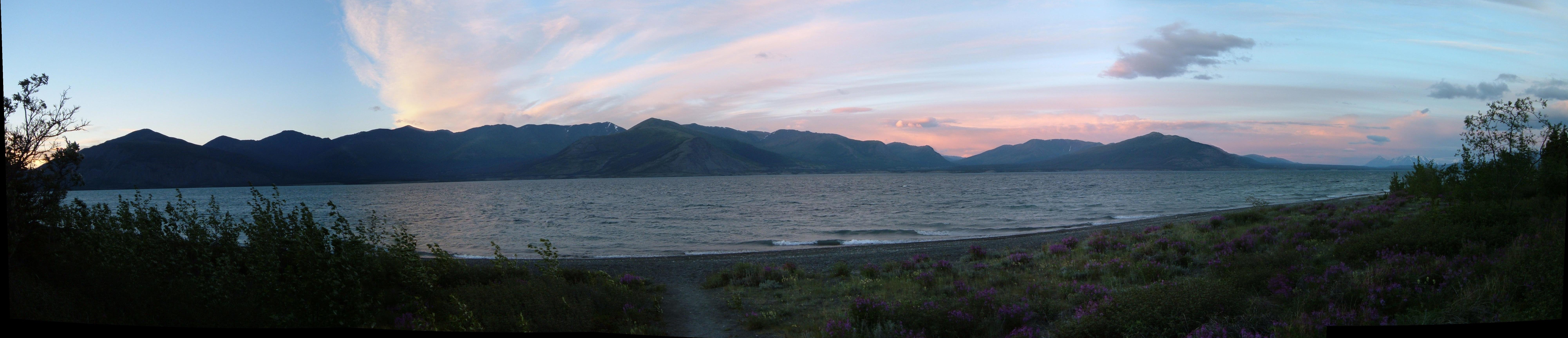
Sunset over Kluane Lake

== See also ==
- Alaska Highway
- Arctia brachyptera or Kluane tiger moth that has only been found in Yukon
- Kluane (electoral district), which encompasses the area
- Kluane National Park and Reserve
