= Kaskawulsh Glacier =

Glacier in Yukon, Canada

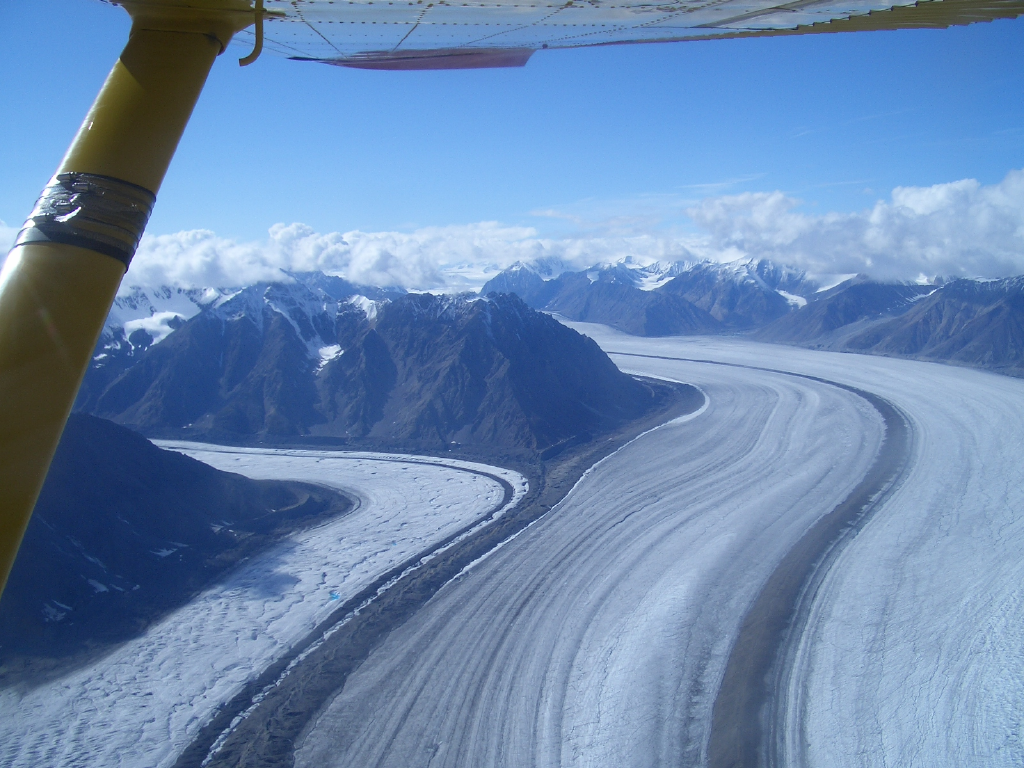
- Kaskawulsh Glacier junction from the air, August 2004

- Location within Yukon
- Type: Valley glacier
- Location: Canada
- Coordinates: 60°48′N 138°36′W
- Length: 78 kilometers (48 mi)
- Terminus: sealevel
- Status: retreating

The Kaskawulsh Glacier is a vast, temperate valley glacier nestled in the Saint Elias Mountains, within Kluane National Park in the Canadian territory of Yukon.

== Geography ==
Located approximately 6,000–9,000 ft (1,800–2,700 m) above sea level, the glacier covers more than 15,000 mi^{2} (39,000 km^{2}) of the surrounding landscape. It terminates at the head of two river valleys, the Slims and the Kaskawulsh River, which feed the Yukon River (via Kluane Lake) and Alsek River systems respectively. The Kaskawulsh is the result of two converging outlet glaciers, the Central and North Arms, and is 3–4 mi (4.8–6.4 km) wide at its broadest point.

== Waterflow ==
Until 2016, abundant melt water from the Kaskawulsh was channeled by ice dam to drain through the Slims River, north to Kluane Lake, and ultimately to the Bering Sea. In 2016, as the glacier receded, the predominant flow abruptly switched to the Kaskawulsh River, flowing east and then south to Alsek River and to the Gulf of Alaska. As the water level at Kluane Lake continues to drop, researchers expect this will become an isolated lake cut off from any outflow.

== Tourism ==
Backpackers can visit the Kaskawulsh along the popular Slims River West Trail, which follows the Slims River south for 19.9 mi (32.0 km) before ending at the summit of Observation Mountain near the toe of the glacier. Backpackers can also follow the Slims River East Route to reach the toe of the glacier, also known as the glacier terminus.

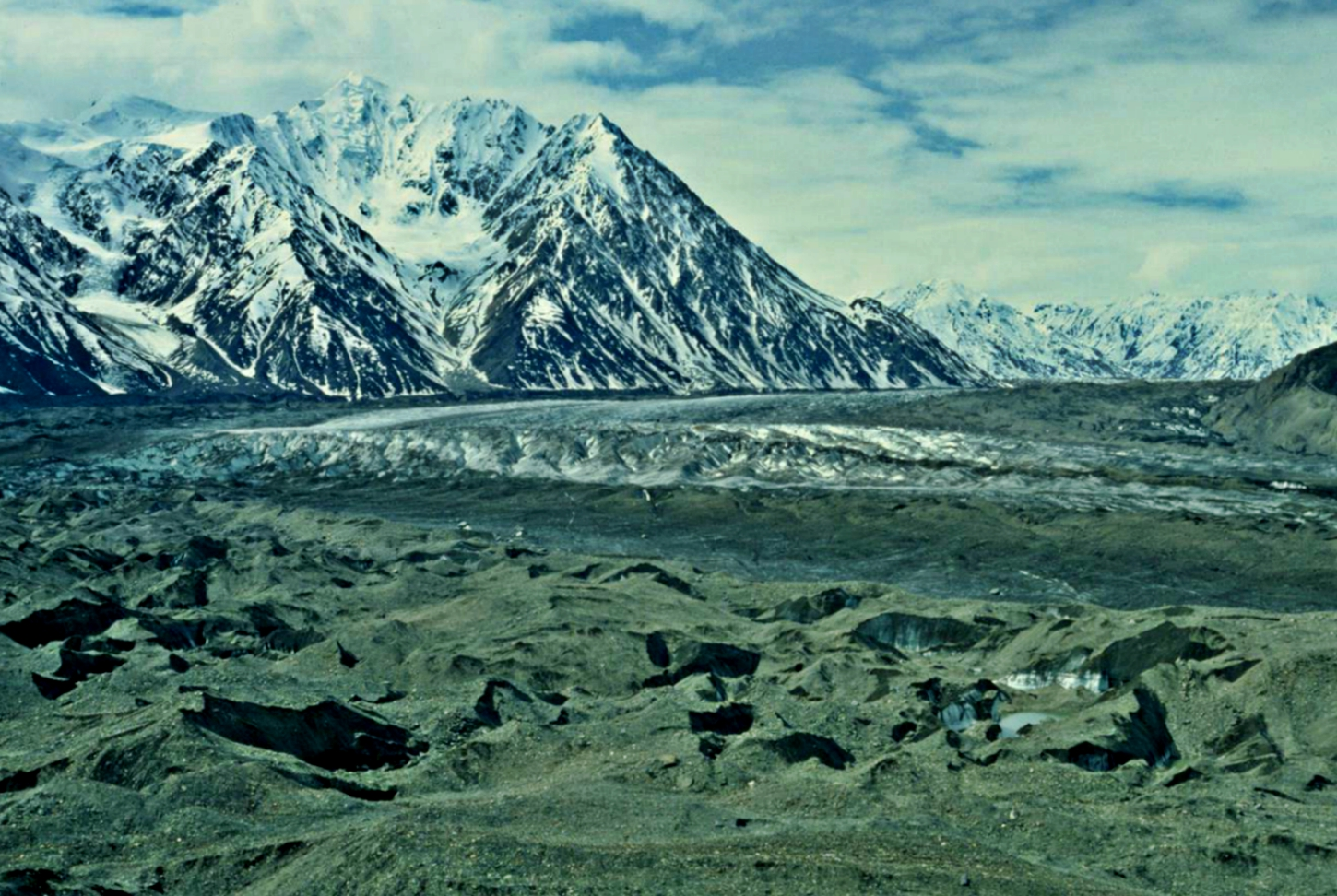
Terminus of the Kaskawulsh Glacier

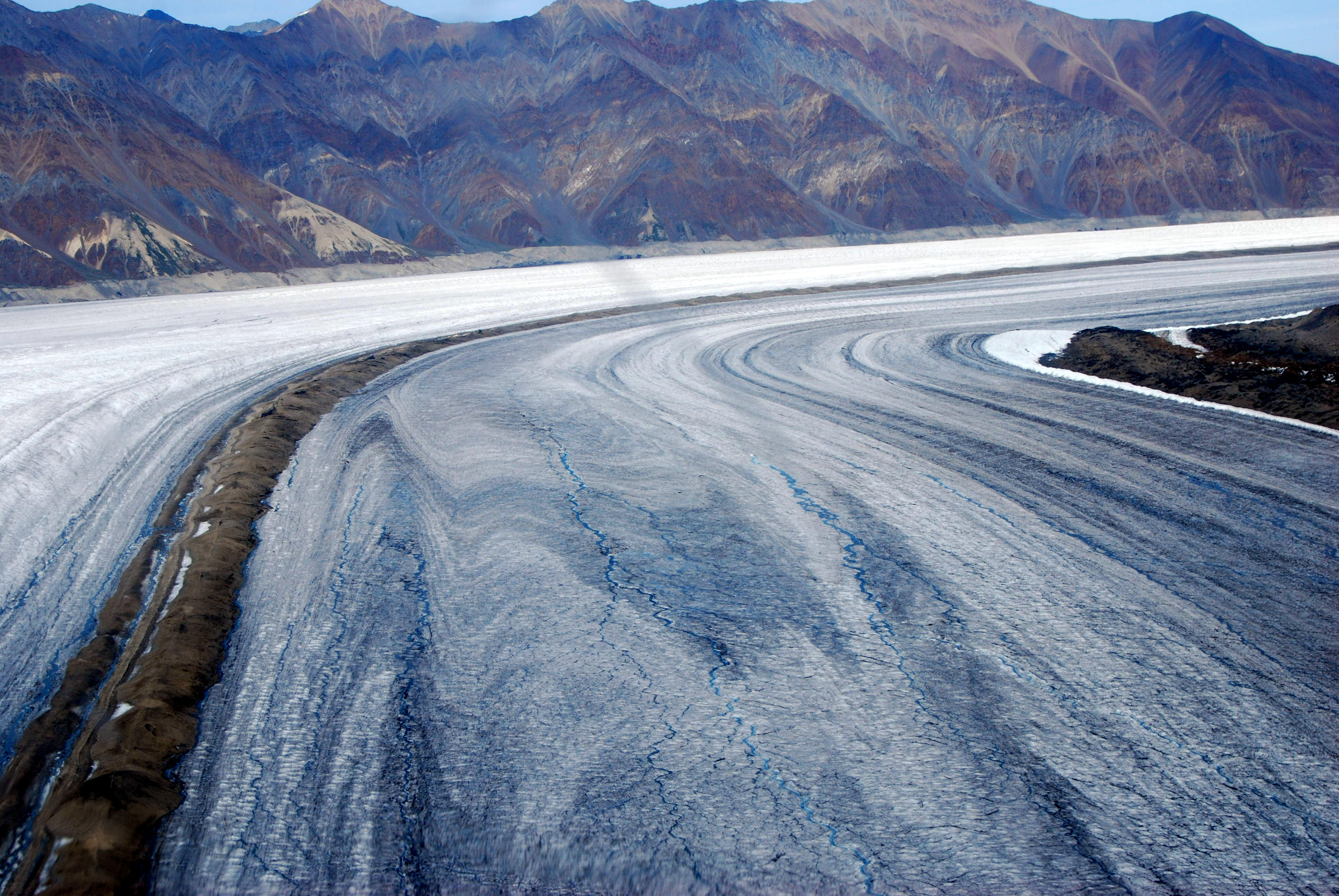
Kaskawulsh Glacier medial moraine. August 2013

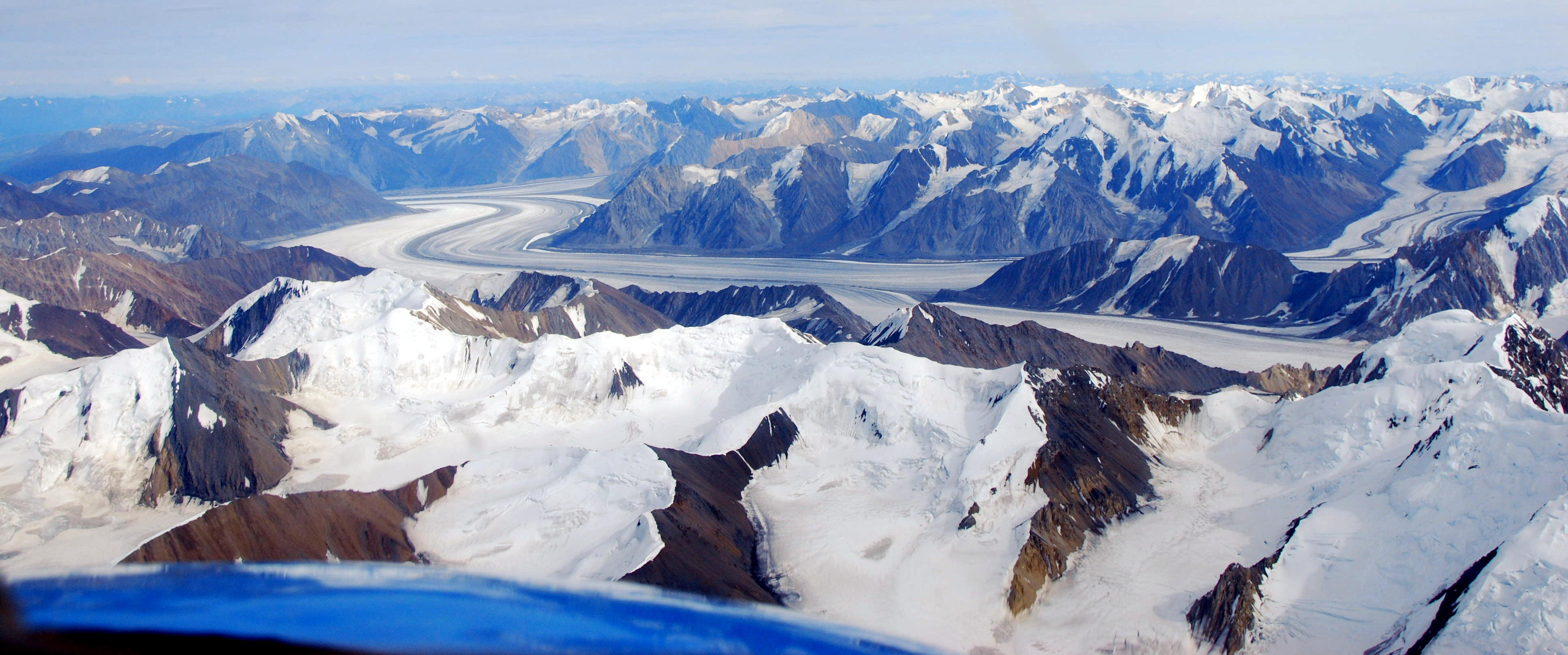
Kaskawulsh Glacier seen from Mount Weyprecht. August 2013
