= Clarence River (Alaska–Yukon) =

- Location of the mouth of the Clarence River in Alaska

Location
- Countries: Canada; United States
- Territory/State: Yukon; Alaska

Physical characteristics
- Source
  - coordinates: 69°29′58″N 141°11′59″W
- Mouth: Beaufort Sea
  - location: Clarence Lagoon
  - coordinates: 69°37′00″N 140°52′00″W
  - elevation: 0 ft (0 m)
- Length: 50 mi (80 km)

Clarence River is a 50-mile (80 km) long river that flows through Yukon, Canada and the U.S. state of Alaska into the Beaufort Sea.

== Course ==
The Clarence River rises southwest of Mount Paige in Yukon, Canada, and flows northwest and northeast, crossing the border several times into the North Slope Borough of Alaska. It empties into Clarence Lagoon and finally the Beaufort Sea in the Arctic Ocean.

== History ==
The river was surveyed in 1826 by British explorer John Franklin as the westernmost river in the then-British territories on the Arctic coast near the line of demarcation with Russia. Franklin named the river Clarence in honor of Lord High Admiral Prince William, Duke of Clarence and St Andrews.

== See also ==
- List of rivers of Alaska
- List of rivers of Yukon

== Notes ==
Clarence Lagoon is the northwesternmost point of the Yukon Territory, and also of continental Canada.
