= Steven Kokelj =

Canadian environmental scientist

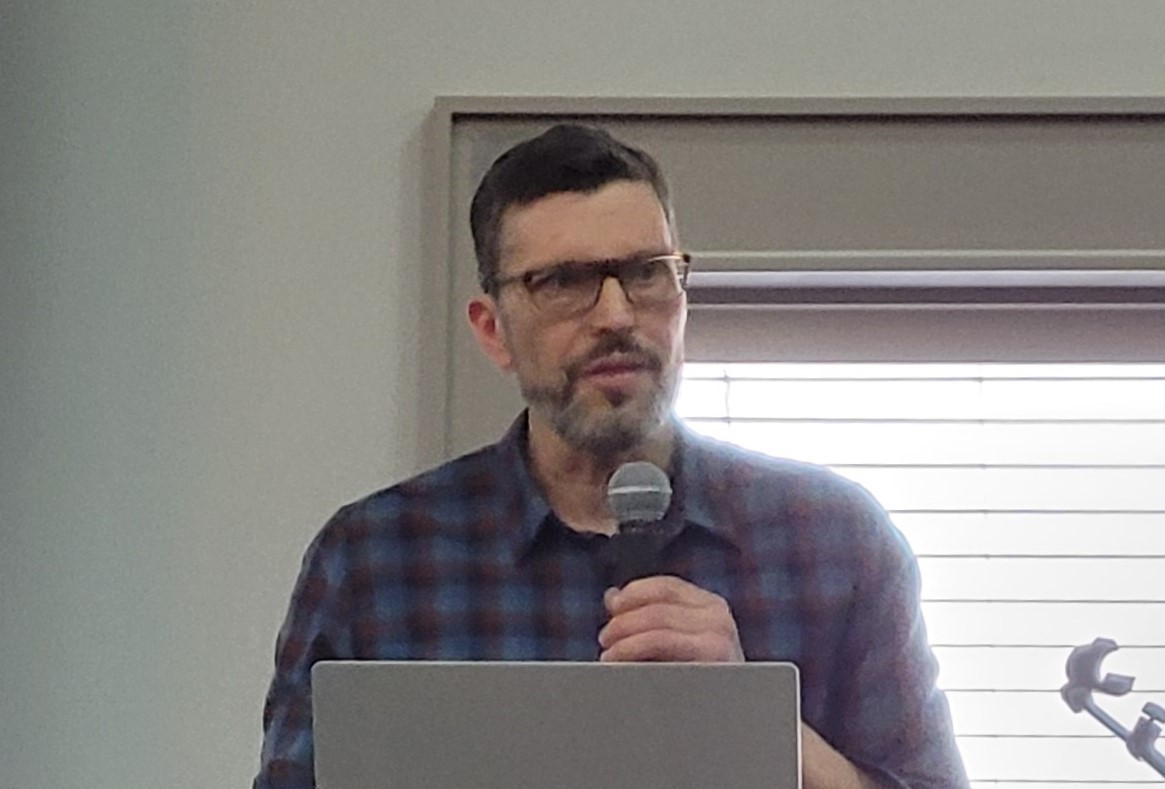
- Education: University of Ottawa; Carleton University
- Occupation: Environmental scientist
- Known for: leading expert on permafrost

Steven Kokelj is a Canadian environmental scientist. Meagan Wohlberg, writing in the Northern Journal, called him the Northwest Territories' foremost expert on permafrost.

Kokelj's PhD thesis, published in 2003, was entitled, "Near-surface Ground Ice in Sediments of the Mackenzie Delta Region, Northwest Territories". Since then Kokelj has held several research positions in the Northwest Territories.

In 2014 Kokelj was the very first speaker invited to lead off a series of talks on Northern issues, hosted in NWT's legislative assembly. The talks were modelled after the TED conferences, and the legislature has made them available via podcast.

== Publications ==
- "Striking Ecological Impact On Canada's Arctic Coastline Linked to Global Climate Change". Science Daily. 2011-05-16. Archived from the original on 2013-07-18.
