= Slims River =

Former river in Yukon, Canada

Coordinates: 61°00′40″N 138°29′30″W

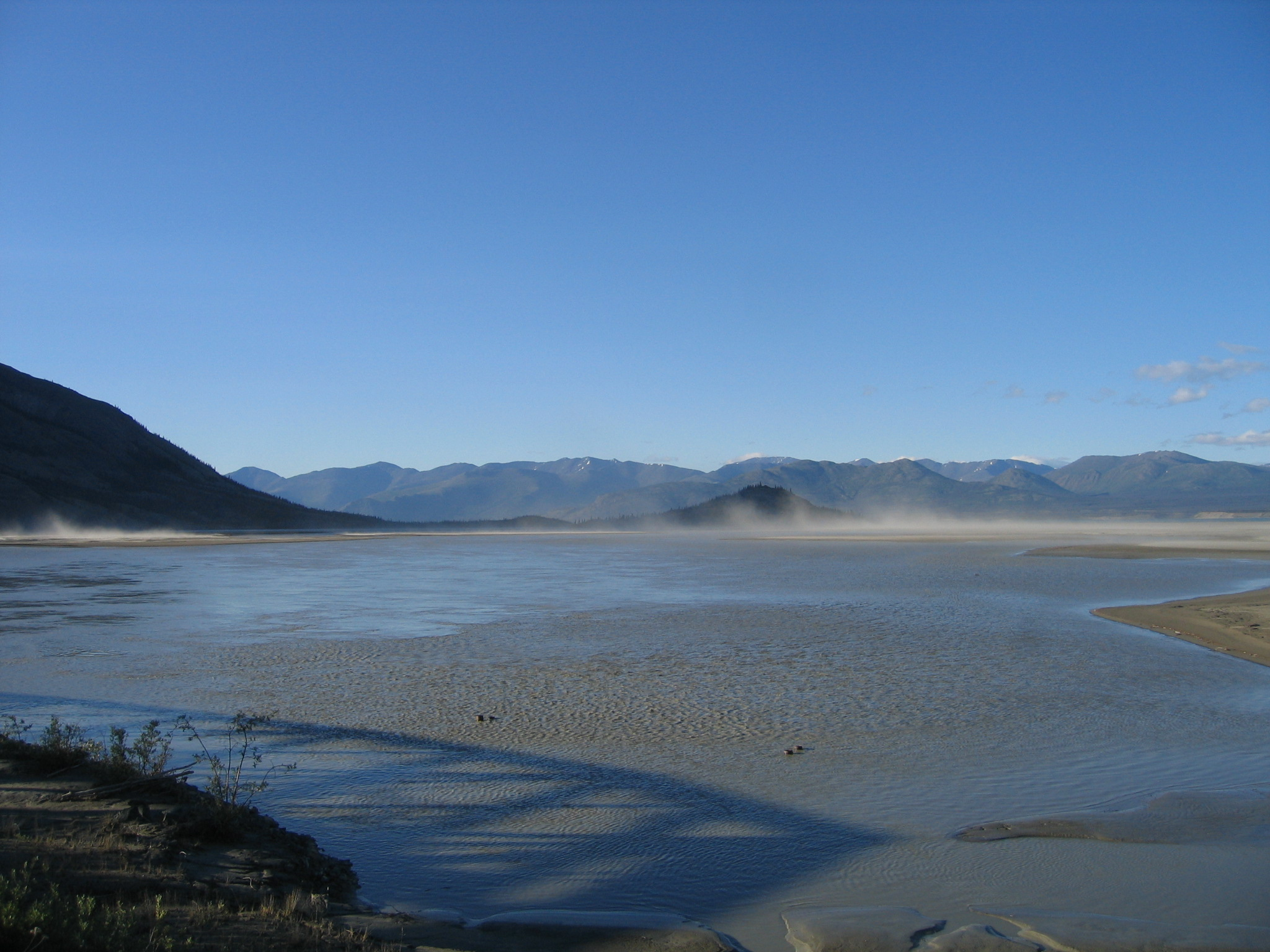
The former mouth of the Slims River, at Kluane Lake

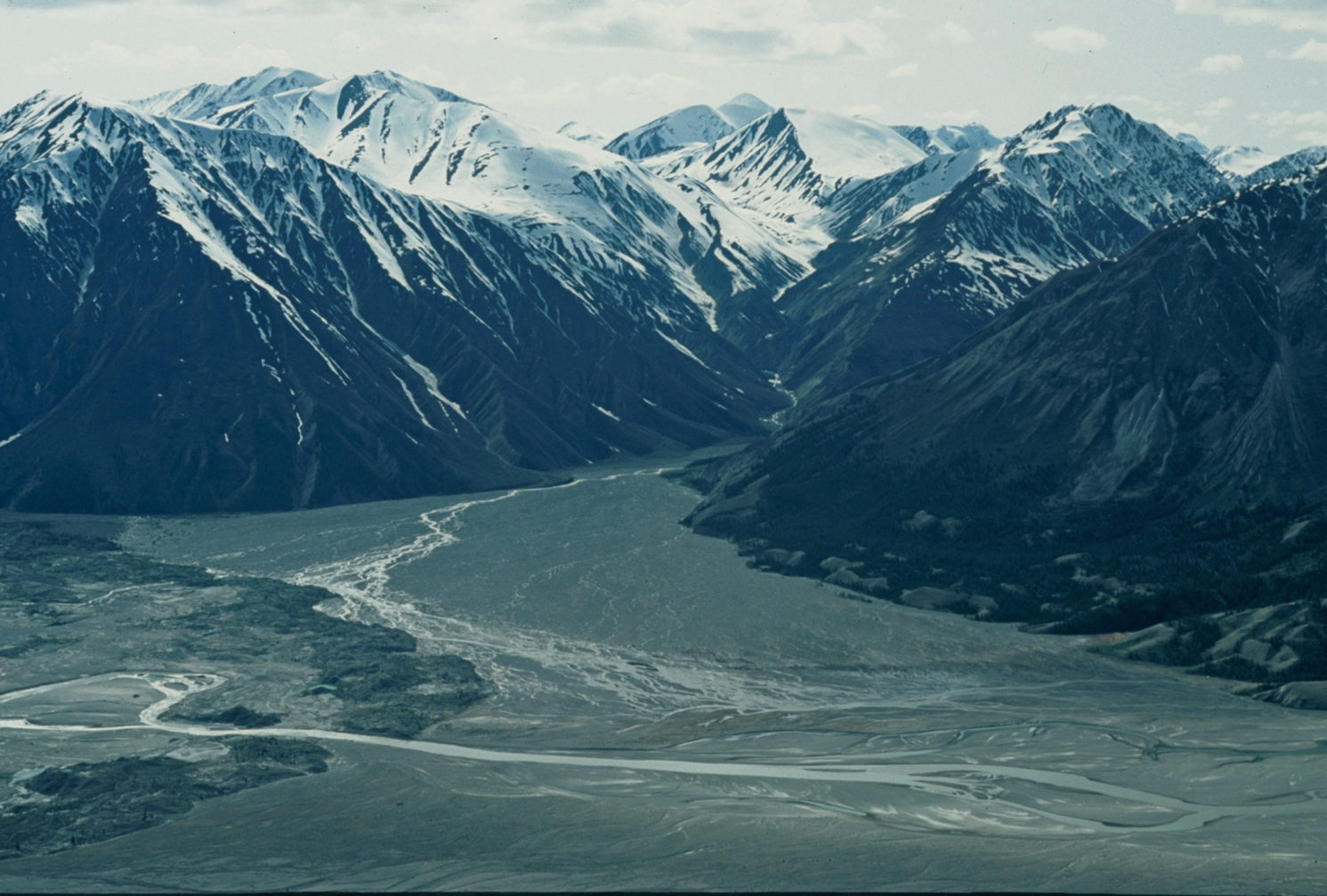
Slims River in 1992

The Slims River (Ä’äy Chù) was a glacially fed river in the Canadian territory of Yukon. Until 2016, it originated in the Kaskawulsh Glacier, then ran approximately 15 mi (24 km) into the southern terminus of Kluane Lake.

Over the course of a few days in the spring of 2016 the flow of the river was changed. Where the meltwater of the Kaskawulsh Glacier had been draining in two directions, now it was all draining into the south-flowing Kaskawulsh River, and further on into the Gulf of Alaska, drastically reducing the size of the Slims. Researchers suggested the change in flow could be due to human-made climate change; this was the first time human-made climate change was implicated in the reorganization of a river.

== Naming ==
The Slims River was purportedly named after a pack horse that drowned while attempting to ford the stream during the 1903 Kluane gold rush. It is crossed by the Alaska Highway at Mile 1065 (Kilometre 1704) just south of its confluence with the lake.

The Indigenous name of the river (Ä’äy Chù) refers to it being the outflow from Ä’äy.
