= Stewart River (Yukon) =

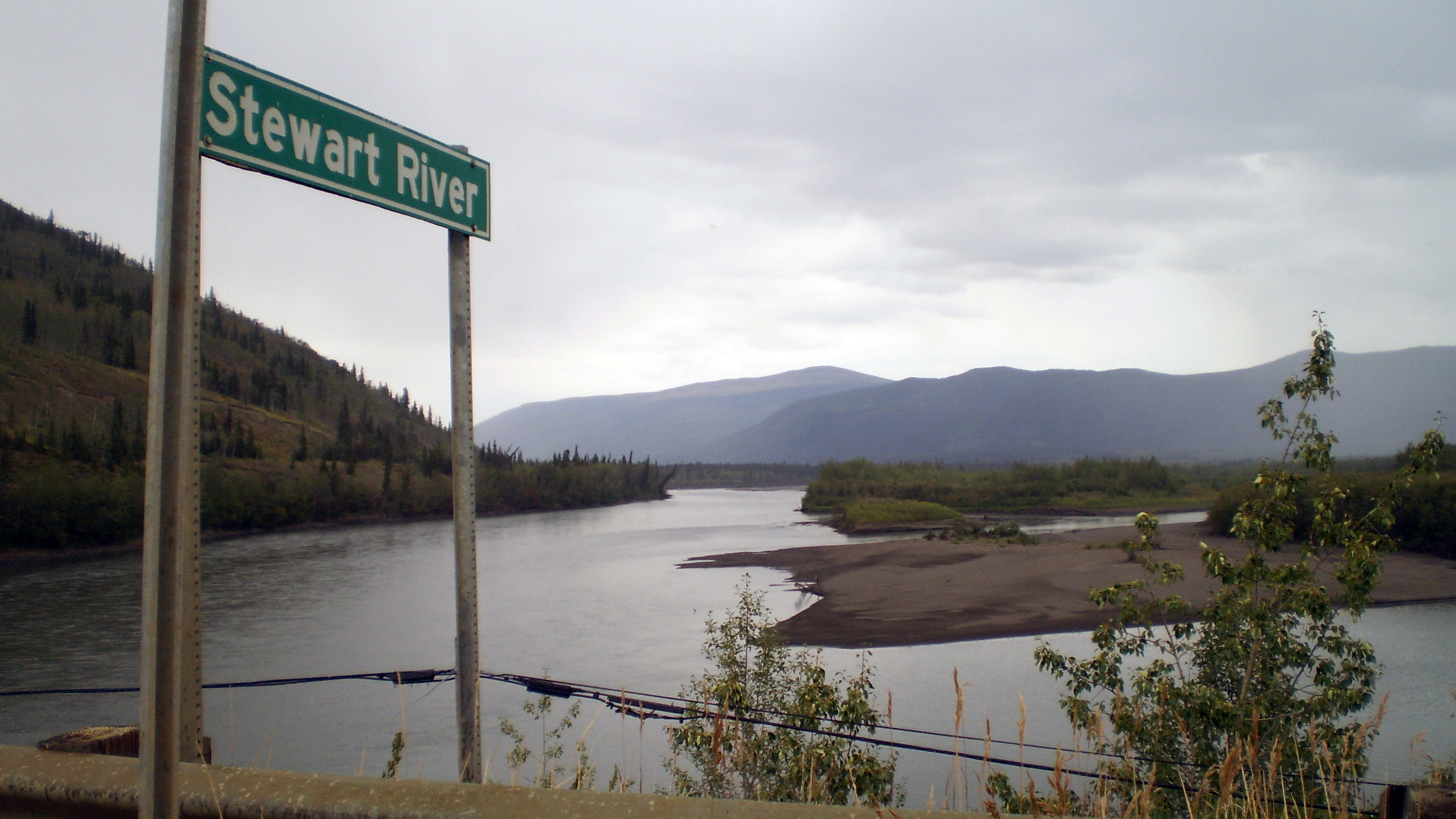
- The Stewart River seen from the Klondike Highway bridge
- Etymology: Named by Robert Campbell for one of his friends in the Hudson's Bay Company
- Native name: Nä`chòo ndek (Hän)

Location
- Country: Canada
- Territory: Yukon
- Cities: Mayo; Stewart Crossing; Stewart River

Physical characteristics
- Source: Selwyn Mountains
- Mouth: Yukon River
  - coordinates: 63°17′30″N 139°24′42″W
- Length: 533 km (331 mi)
- Basin size: 51,000 km^{2} (20,000 sq mi)
- Discharge
  - average: 850 m^{3}/s (30,000 cu ft/s)
  - minimum: 52 m^{3}/s (1,800 cu ft/s)
  - maximum: 3,940 m^{3}/s (139,000 cu ft/s)

Basin features
- Tributaries
  - left: Hess River
  - right: Beaver River (Stewart River)

The Stewart River (Hän: Nä`chòo ndek) is a 533-kilometre (331 mi) tributary of Yukon River in the Yukon Territory of Canada. It originates in the Selwyn Mountains, which stand on the border between the Northwest Territories and the Yukon Territory. From there, the Stewart flows west, past the village of Mayo. The river is crossed by the Klondike Highway at the village of Stewart Crossing, and the highway parallels the river westward for about 56 kilometres (35 mi). After leaving the highway, the river travels southwest until it intersects the Yukon River 112 kilometres (70 mi) south of Dawson City. The mostly abandoned village of Stewart River is located at the mouth of the river.

The Stewart River was explored by Robert Campbell of the Hudson's Bay Company in 1850. He named the river after a close friend and assistant in the company, James Green Stewart. Stewart was instrumental in helping Campbell build and supply Fort Selkirk at the junction of the Pelly and Yukon rivers. It lay undeveloped until the Klondike Gold Rush opened the area to prospecting and mining. Because the Stewart River was located away from the Klondike River and the best-known gold fields, it did not receive as much attention from big mining companies. Individual miners and smaller companies explored gold prospects along the river, and in 1914, a large silver lode was found on a tributary of the Stewart. This spurred mining, and in 1918, an even bigger silver source was found at the present-day site of Keno City.

Mining operations increased and, by 1923, the value of silver mined from the Stewart River area surpassed that of the gold taken from the Klondike. Because the Stewart is shallower than the Yukon River, ordinary steamboats could not be used on the river. Special models had to be built, and these operated on the Stewart River until they were replaced by a road network after World War II. The S.S. Keno, a Stewart River steamer, has been preserved as a Canadian historic monument in Dawson City.

== See also ==
- List of longest rivers of Canada
- List of rivers of Yukon
