= Peel River (Canada) =

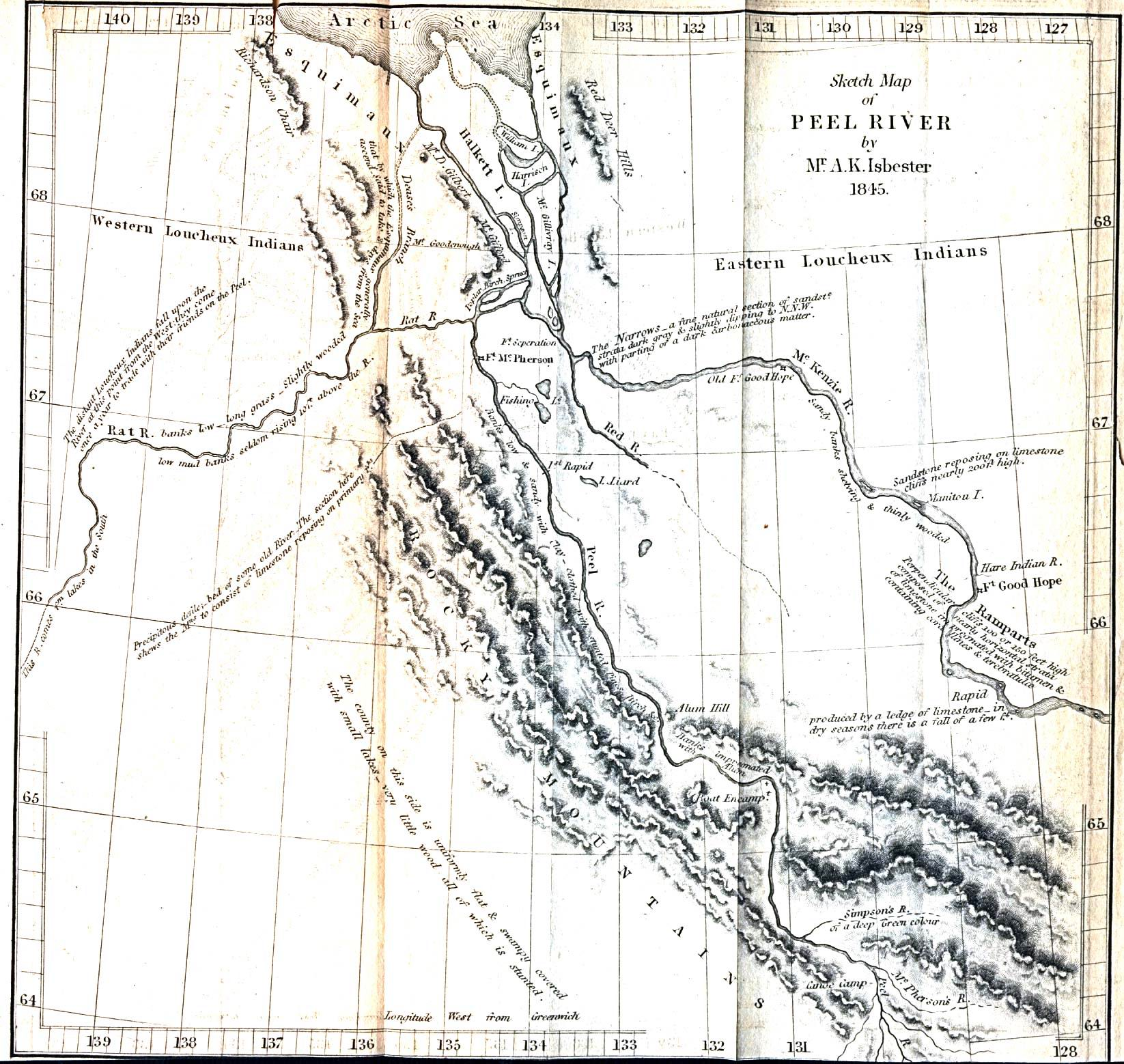
- Peel River, 1845

- Location of mouth
- Native name: Teetł'it Gwinjik (Gwichʼin)

Location
- Country: Canada
- Territories: Yukon; Northwest Territories

Physical characteristics
- Source: Ogilvie Mountains
- Mouth: Mackenzie River
  - location: Mackenzie Delta
  - coordinates: 67°0′0″N 134°59′3″W
- Basin size: 73,600 km^{2} (28,400 sq mi)
- Discharge
  - location: Fort McPherson, Northwest Territories
  - average: 691 m^{3}/s (24,400 cu ft/s)
  - minimum: 46.8 m^{3}/s (1,650 cu ft/s)
  - maximum: 8,800 m^{3}/s (310,000 cu ft/s)

The Peel River (Teetł'it Gwinjik in Gwich’in) is a tributary of the Mackenzie River in Yukon and the Northwest Territories in Canada. Its source is in the Ogilvie Mountains in central Yukon at the confluence of the Ogilvie River and Blackstone River. Its main tributaries are:

- Ogilvie River
- Blackstone River
- Hart River
- Wind River (Yukon)
- Bonnet Plume River
- Snake River (Yukon)

The Peel River joins the Mackenzie in the Mackenzie Delta. However, a distributary of the Peel is the headwater for a channel that later collects distributaries of the Mackenzie. This means that a channel can be followed for a longer distance downriver until it, itself, disseminates into the shared delta. This arguably adds a greater length to the Peel River.

The Dempster Highway crosses it at Fort McPherson, via a ferry during the summer months and an ice bridge during the winter. The Peel River is a wilderness river and Fort McPherson is the only community along its banks. The Yukon part of the Peel Watershed is undergoing land use planning.

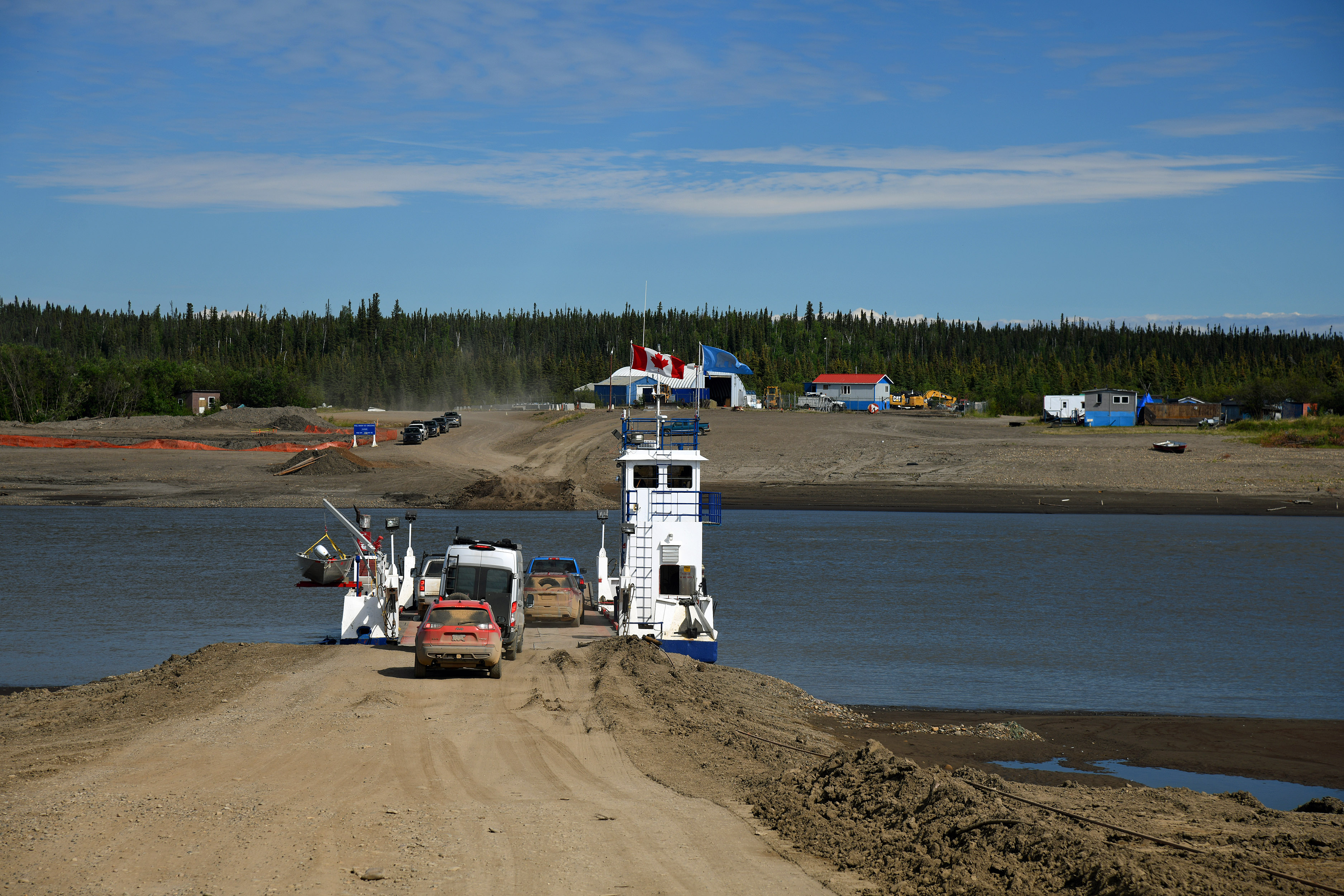
Peel River ferry crossing, Dempster Highway, viewed from the south

Steven Kokelj, a specialist in permafrost, has documented significant changes in the balance of dissolved ions in the river's water as the region's permafrost starts to melt. Ions of elements like calcium and sulphur dissolve easily when the permafrost thaws.

== See also ==
- List of longest rivers of Canada
- List of rivers of the Northwest Territories
- List of rivers of Yukon
