= Old Crow River =

- Location of the mouth of the Old Crow River in Yukon

Location
- Countries: Canada; United States
- Territories/States: Yukon; Alaska

Physical characteristics
- Source
  - location: Davidson Mountains, Alaska, United States
  - coordinates: 68°14′36″N 141°36′51″W
  - elevation: 837 m (2,746 ft)
- Mouth: Porcupine River
  - location: Porcupine Plateau, Yukon, Canada
  - coordinates: 67°34′30″N 139°50′00″W
  - elevation: 255 m (837 ft)
- Length: 282 km (175 mi)

Old Crow River is a transnational stream, 282 kilometres (175 mi) long, that begins in the U.S. state of Alaska and flows generally southeast to meet the Porcupine River in the Canadian territory of Yukon. In turn, the Porcupine, a tributary of the Yukon River, flows back into the United States, and its water eventually reaches the Bering Sea.

== Archaeology finds ==
Richard E. Morlan of the Canadian Museum of Civilization and Archaeological Survey of Canada conducted a study of modified bones found on Old Crow River sites in the 1970s. Morlan stated that the bones found exhibited signs of intentional human work before the bones were fossilized. This would suggest humans were in Canada during the late Pleistocene. This would place humans in the Americas earlier than thought by scientists.

Later R.M. Thorson and R.D. Guthrie tried to refute Morlan's research in a study they conducted. Thorson and Guthrie claimed that river action could cause the markings on the bones that Morlan attributed to humans. Morlan believed Thorson's experiments have not shown that all the altered fossils from Old Crow Basin can be attributed to river icing and breakup.

== See also ==
- List of rivers of Alaska
