= Porcupine River =

River in Canada and the United States

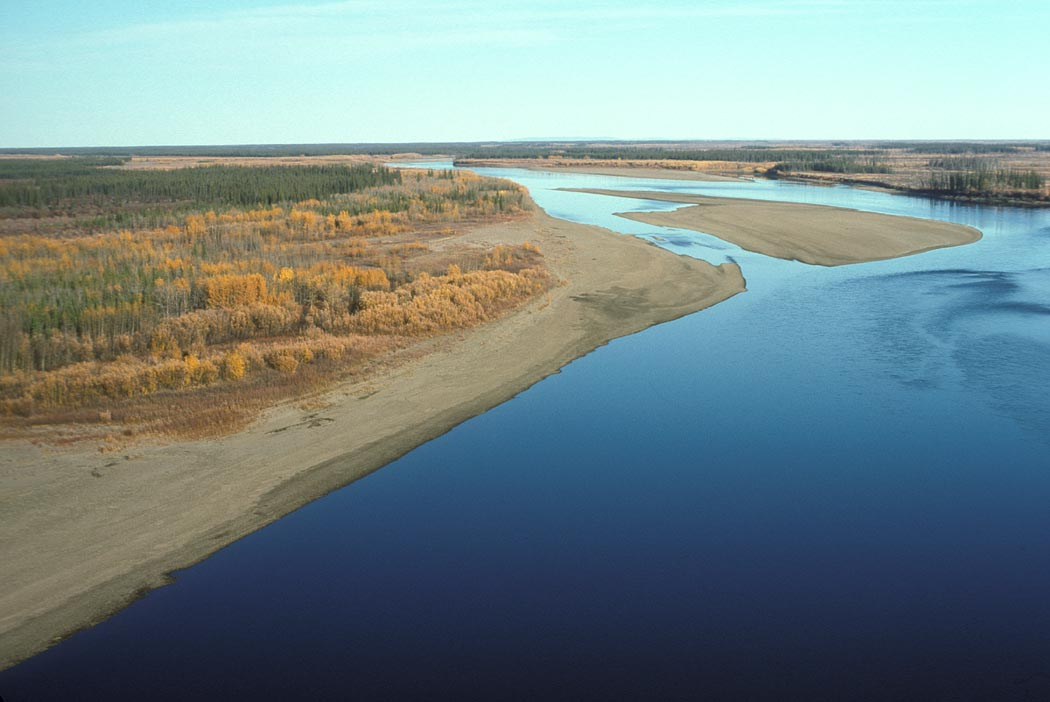
- Porcupine River

- Location of the mouth of the Porcupine River in Alaska
- Native name: Ch’ôonjik (Gwichʼin)

Location
- Countries: Canada; United States
- Territories/States: Yukon; Alaska

Physical characteristics
- Source: Nahoni Range
  - location: Ogilvie Mountains, Yukon, Canada
  - coordinates: 65°28′N 139°32′W
- Mouth: Yukon River
  - location: Fort Yukon, Alaska, United States
  - coordinates: 66°35′42″N 145°18′32″W
  - elevation: 126 m (413 ft)
- Length: 916 km (569 mi)
- Basin size: 118,000 km^{2} (46,000 sq mi)
- Discharge
  - average: 414 m^{3}/s (14,600 cu ft/s)

The Porcupine River (Ch’ôonjik in Gwich’in) is a 916 km (569 mi) tributary of the Yukon River in Canada and the United States. It rises in the Ogilvie Mountains north of Dawson City, Yukon, Canada. From there it flows north through the community of Old Crow, veers southwest into the U.S. state of Alaska, and enters the larger river at Fort Yukon, Alaska. It derives its name from the Gwich'in word for the river, Ch'oonjik, or "Porcupine Quill River".

The Porcupine caribou herd, whose range includes the Arctic National Wildlife Refuge (ANWR) in Alaska, gets its name from its calving grounds around the Porcupine River.

Possible (but disputed) evidence of the oldest known human habitation in North America comes from a cave on one of the Porcupine's tributaries, the Bluefish River. Many apparently human-modified animal bones have been discovered in the Bluefish Caves. Radiocarbon dating has assessed them as 25,000 to 40,000 years old—several thousand years earlier than the generally accepted date for human habitation of North America.

== Boating ==
The Porcupine River offers the possibility of "an excellent novice river trip for those experienced in remote wilderness travel," according to author Karen Jettmar. Boaters can travel by canoe, kayak, or raft, though rafters may have difficulty with upriver winds. A 800 km (500 mi) float trip beginning at Summit Lake in the Yukon Territory, descending the Bell River to its confluence with the Porcupine, and continuing to Fort Yukon is all rated Class I (easy) on the international scale of river difficulty. However, in high water the difficulty may rise to Class II in Upper and Lower Rampart canyons, downstream of the international border, where the current is swift.

== See also ==
- Old Crow River
- List of longest rivers of Canada
- List of rivers of Alaska
- List of rivers of Yukon

== Works cited ==
- Benke, Arthur C., ed., and Cushing, Colbert E., ed.; Bailey, Robert C. (2005). "Chapter 17: Yukon River Basin" in Rivers of North America. Burlington, Massachusetts: Elsevier Academic Press. ISBN 0-12-088253-1. OCLC 59003378.
