= Natural landscape =

Original landscape formed by nature

A natural landscape is the original landscape that exists before it is acted upon by human culture. (Note: "The area prior to the introduction of man 's activity is represented by one body of morphologic facts. The forms that man has introduced are another set. We may call the former, with reference to man, the original, natural landscape. In its entirety it no longer exists in many parts of the world, but its reconstruction and understanding are the first part of formal morphonology.") The natural landscape and the cultural landscape are separate parts of the landscape. (Note: "The cultural landscape is fashioned from a natural landscape by a culture group. Culture is the agent, the natural area is the medium, the cultural landscape the result.") However, in the 21st century, landscapes that are totally untouched by human activity no longer exist, so that reference is sometimes now made to degrees of naturalness within a landscape. (Note: The European Environment Agency's planned forest naturalness index is an example of an attempt to define one type of natural landscape in Europe. The Agency lists forests in three categories: (1) Plantations; (2) Semi-natural; and (3) Naturally dynamic. The latter are "forests whose structure, composition and function have been shaped by natural dynamics without substantial anthropogenic influence over a long period of time".)

In Silent Spring (1962) Rachel Carson describes a roadside verge as it used to look: "Along the roads, laurel, viburnum and alder, great ferns and wildflowers delighted the traveler’s eye through much of the year" and then how it looks now following the use of herbicides: "The roadsides, once so attractive, were now lined with browned and withered vegetation as though swept by fire". Even though the landscape before it is sprayed is biologically degraded, and may well contains alien species, the concept of what might constitute a natural landscape can still be deduced from the context.

The phrase "natural landscape" was first used in connection with landscape painting, and landscape gardening, to contrast a formal style with a more natural one, closer to nature. Alexander von Humboldt (1769 – 1859) was to further conceptualize this into the idea of a natural landscape separate from the cultural landscape. Then in 1908 geographer Otto Schlüter developed the terms original landscape (Urlandschaft) and its opposite cultural landscape (Kulturlandschaft) in an attempt to give the science of geography a subject matter that was different from the other sciences. An early use of the actual phrase "natural landscape" by a geographer can be found in Carl O. Sauer's paper "The Morphology of Landscape" (1925).

== Origins of the term ==
The concept of a natural landscape was first developed in connection with landscape painting, though the actual term itself was first used in relation to landscape gardening. In both cases it was used to contrast a formal style with a more natural one, that is closer to nature. Chunglin Kwa suggests, "that a seventeenth-century or early-eighteenth-century pen could experience natural scenery 'just like on a painting,’ and so, with or without the use of the word itself, designate it as a landscape." With regard to landscape gardening John Aikin, commented in 1794: "Whatever, therefore, there be of novelty in the singular scenery of an artificial garden, it is soon exhausted, whereas the infinite diversity of a natural landscape presents an inexhaustible flore of new forms". Writing in 1844 the prominent American landscape gardener Andrew Jackson Downing comments: "straight canals, round or oblong pieces of water, and all the regular forms of the geometric mode ... would evidently be in violent opposition to the whole character and expression of natural landscape".

In his extensive travels in South America, Alexander von Humboldt became the first to conceptualize a natural landscape separate from the cultural landscape, though he does not actually use these terms. (Note: "The description of nature in its manifold richness of form, as a distinct branch of poetic literature, was wholly unknown to the Greeks. The landscape appears among them merely as the basil-ground of the picture of which human figures constitute the main subject. Passions, breaking forth into action, riveted their attention almost exclusively.") Andrew Jackson Downing was aware of, and sympathetic to, Humboldt's ideas, which therefore influenceded American landscape gardening

Subsequently, the geographer Otto Schlüter, in 1908, argued that by defining geography as a Landschaftskunde (landscape science) would give geography a logical subject matter shared by no other discipline. He defined two forms of landscape: the Urlandschaft (original landscape) or landscape that existed before major human induced changes and the Kulturlandschaft (cultural landscape) a landscape created by human culture. Schlüter argued that the major task of geography was to trace the changes in these two landscapes.

The term natural landscape is sometimes used as a synonym for wilderness, but for geographers natural landscape is a scientific term which refers to the biological, geological, climatological and other aspects of a landscape, not the cultural values that are implied by the word wilderness.

=== The natural and conservation ===
Matters are complicated by the fact that the words nature and natural have more than one meaning. On the one hand there is the main dictionary meaning for nature: "The phenomena of the physical world collectively, including plants, animals, the landscape, and other features and products of the earth, as opposed to humans or human creations." On the other hand, there is the growing awareness, especially since Charles Darwin, of humanity's biological affinity with nature.

The dualism of the first definition has its roots in an "ancient concept", because early people viewed "nature, or the nonhuman world […] as a divine brother, godlike in its separation from humans." In the West, Christianity's myth of the fall, that is the expulsion of humankind from the Garden of Eden, where all creation lived in harmony, into an imperfect world, has been the major influence. Cartesian dualism, from the seventeenth century on, further reinforced this dualistic thinking about nature. With this dualism goes value judgement as to the superiority of the natural over the artificial. Modern science, however, is moving towards a holistic view of naturetion.

==== America ====
What is meant by natural, within the American conservation movement, has been changing over the last century and a half.

In the mid-nineteenth century American began to realize that the land was becoming more and more domesticated and wildlife was disappearing. This led to the creation of American National Parks and other conservation sites. Initially it was believed that all that was needed to do was to separate what was seen as natural landscape and "avoid disturbances such as logging, grazing, fire and insect outbreaks." This, and subsequent environmental policy, until recently, was influenced by ideas of the wilderness. However, this policy was not consistently applied, and in Yellowstone Park, to take one example, the existing ecology was altered, firstly by the exclusion of Native Americans and later with the virtual extermination of the wolf population.

A century later, in the mid-twentieth century, it began to be believed that the earlier policy of "protection from disturbance was inadequate to preserve park values", and that is that direct human intervention was necessary to restore the landscape of National Parks to its ‘'natural'’ condition. In 1963 the Leopold Report argued that "A national park should represent a vignette of primitive America". This policy change eventually led to the restoration of wolves in Yellowstone Park in the 1990s.

However, recent research in various disciplines indicates that a pristine natural or "primitive" landscape is a myth, and it now realised that people have been changing the natural into a cultural landscape for a long while, and that there are few places untouched in some way from human influence. The earlier conservation policies were now seen as cultural interventions. The idea of what is natural and what artificial or cultural, and how to maintain the natural elements in a landscape, has been further complicated by the discovery of global warming and how it is changing natural landscapes.

Also important is a reaction recently amongst scholars against dualistic thinking about nature and culture. Maria Kaika comments: "Nowadays, we are beginning to see nature and culture as intertwined once again – not ontologically separated anymore […].What I used to perceive as a compartmentalized world, consisting of neatly and tightly sealed, autonomous 'space envelopes' (the home, the city, and nature) was, in fact, a messy socio-spatial continuum". And William Cronon argues against the idea of wilderness because it "involves a dualistic vision in which the human is entirely outside the natural" and affirms that "wildness (as opposed to wilderness) can be found anywhere" even "in the cracks of a Manhattan sidewalk." According to Cronon we have to "abandon the dualism that sees the tree in the garden as artificial […] and the tree in the wilderness as natural […] Both in some ultimate sense are wild." Here he bends somewhat the regular dictionary meaning of wild, to emphasise that nothing natural, even in a garden, is fully under human control.

==== Europe ====
The landscape of Europe has considerably altered by people and even in an area, like the Cairngorm Mountains of Scotland, with a low population density, only " the high summits of the Cairngorm Mountains, consist entirely of natural elements. These high summits are of course only part of the Cairngorms, and there are no longer wolves, bears, wild boar or lynx in Scotland's wilderness. The Scots pine in the form of the Caledonian forest also covered much more of the Scottish landscape than today.

The Swiss National Park, however, represent a more natural landscape. It was founded in 1914, and is one of the earliest national parks in Europe.

Visitors are not allowed to leave the motor road, or paths through the park, make fire or camp. The only building within the park is Chamanna Cluozza, mountain hut. It is also forbidden to disturb the animals or the plants, or to take home anything found in the park. Dogs are not allowed. Due to these strict rules, the Swiss National Park is the only park in the Alps who has been categorized by the IUCN as a strict nature reserve, which is the highest protection level.

== History of natural landscape ==
No place on the Earth is unaffected by people and their culture. People are part of biodiversity, but human activity affects biodiversity, and this alters the natural landscape. Mankind have altered landscape to such an extent that few places on earth remain pristine, but once free of human influences, the landscape can return to a natural or near natural state.

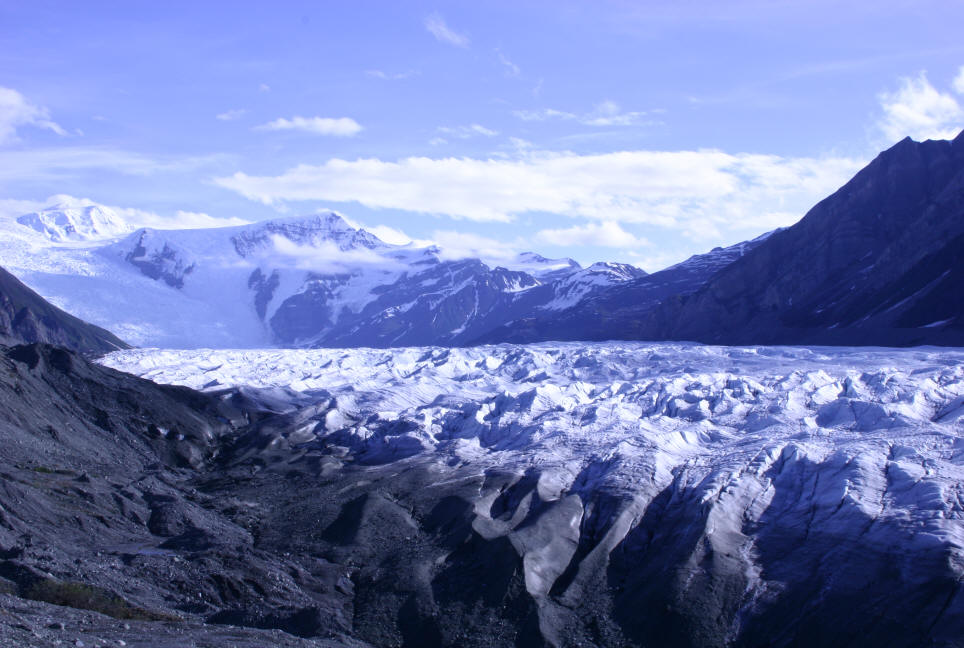
Glacier on the border between Alaska, US, and Canada: Kluane-Wrangell-St. Elias-Glacier Bay-Tatshenshini-Alsek park system.

Even the remote Yukon and Alaskan wilderness, the bi-national Kluane-Wrangell-St. Elias-Glacier Bay-Tatshenshini-Alsek park system comprising Kluane, Wrangell-St Elias, Glacier Bay and Tatshenshini-Alsek parks, a UNESCO World Heritage Site, is not free from human influence, because the Kluane National Park lies within the traditional territories of the Champagne and Aishihik First Nations and Kluane First Nation who have a long history of living in this region. Through their respective Final Agreements with the Canadian Government, they have made into law their rights to harvest in this region.

== Examples of cultural forces ==
Cultural forces intentionally or unintentionally, have an influence upon the landscape. (Note: "It is true that certain human technological actions do have unintended consequences that spread everywhere; there are contagious effects that seep into the nooks and crannies of all nature.") Cultural landscapes are places or artifacts created and maintained by people. Examples of cultural intrusions into a landscape are: fences, roads, parking lots, sand pits, buildings, hiking trails, management of plants, including the introduction of invasive species, extraction or removal of plants, management of animals, mining, hunting, natural landscaping, farming and forestry, pollution. Areas that might be confused with a natural landscape include public parks, farms, orchards, artificial lakes and reservoirs, managed forests, golf courses, nature center trails, gardens.

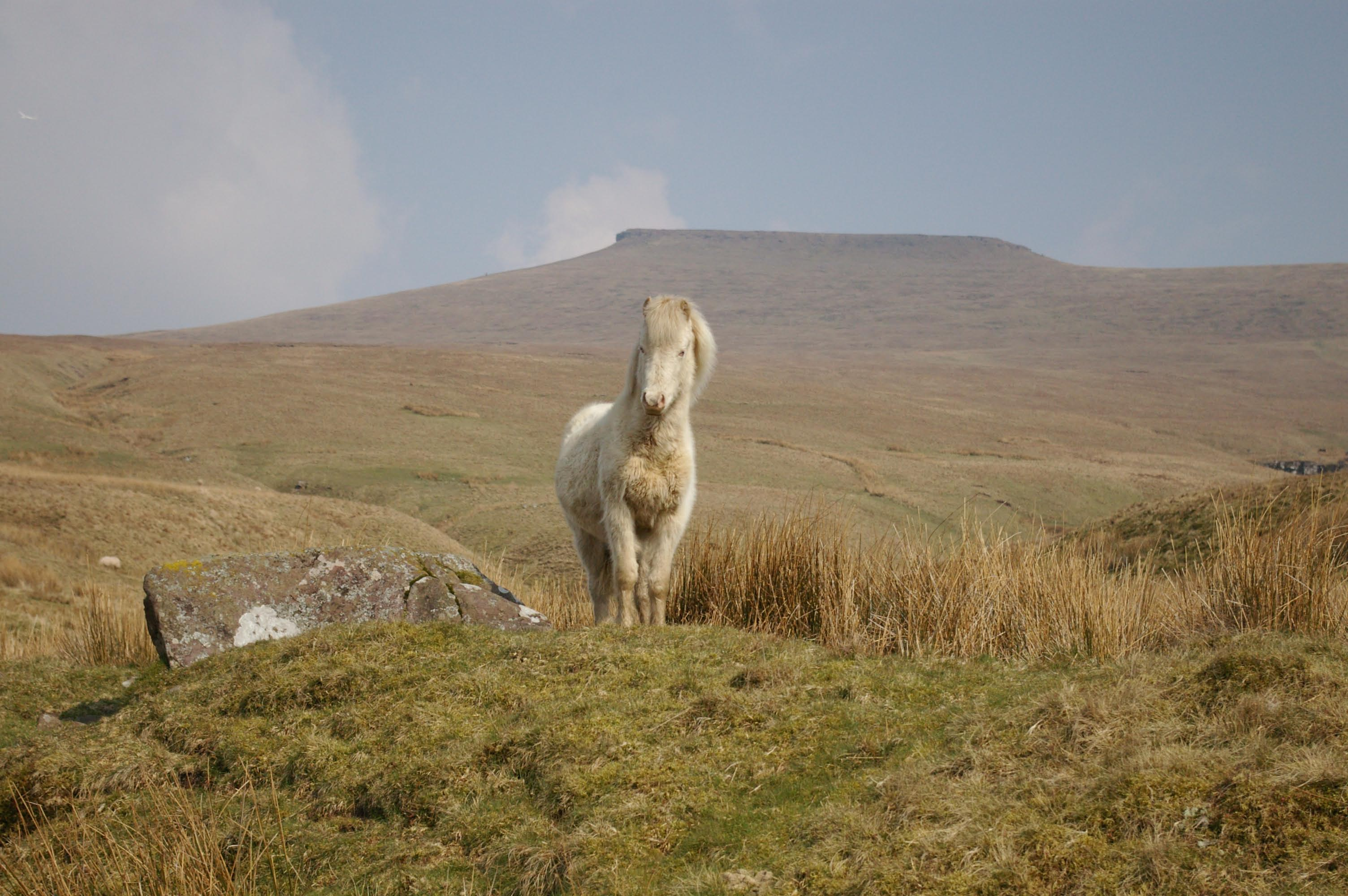
A Welsh mountain pony in the Brecon Beacons National park, Wales. Sheep and cattle also graze on this upland.

== See also ==
- Cityscape
- Intact forest landscape
- Land restoration
- Land use
- Landscape art
- National Parks
- Natural environment
- Natural heritage
- Passive rewilding
- Rewilding (conservation biology)
- Romantic movement
- Seascapes
- Skyscape art
- Soundscape
