= Kluane / Wrangell–St. Elias / Glacier Bay / Tatshenshini-Alsek =

US–Canada park system

Kluane/Wrangell-St. Elias/Glacier Bay/Tatshenshini-Alsek
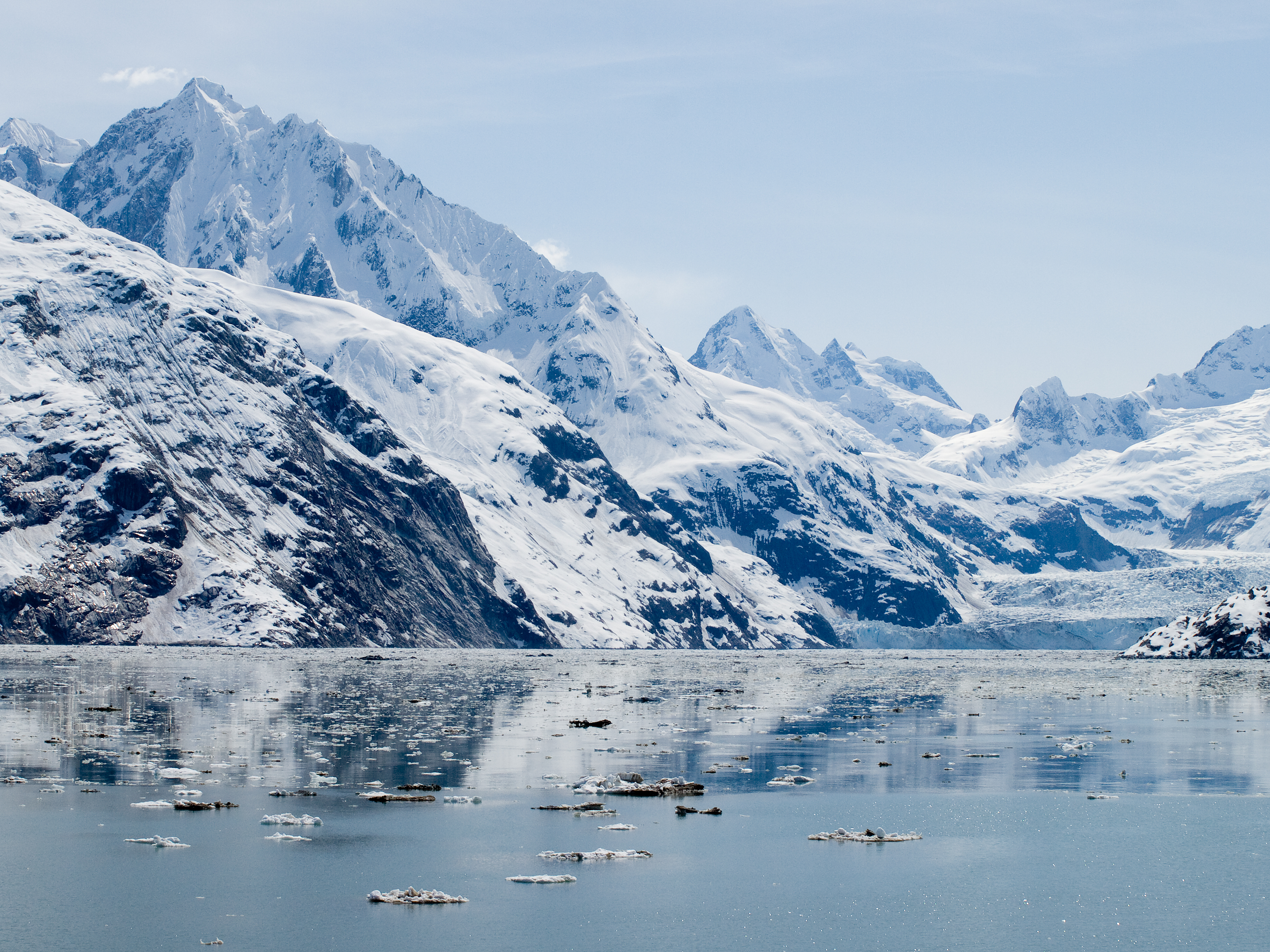
- Glacier in Glacier Bay Park

- Location within North America
- Interactive map of Kluane/Wrangell-St. Elias/Glacier Bay/Tatshenshini-Alsek
- 61.1975°N 140.992°W
- Location: Canada and the United States

Site notes
- Area: 98391.21 km^{2} (37989.06 mi^{2})
- Governing body: Parks Canada, BC Parks, U.S. National Park Service

UNESCO World Heritage Site
- Type: Natural
- Criteria: vii, viii, ix, x
- Designated: 1979 (3rd session)
- Reference no.: 72
- Region: Europe and North America
- Extensions: 1992; 1994

Kluane / Wrangell–St. Elias / Glacier Bay / Tatshenshini-Alsek is an international park system located in Canada and the United States, at the border of Yukon, Alaska, and British Columbia.

It was declared a UNESCO World Heritage Site in 1994 for the spectacular glacier and icefield landscapes as well as for the importance of grizzly bears, caribou and Dall sheep habitat. The total area of the site is 98391.21 square kilometres (37989.06 mi^{2}), which is just smaller than the country of South Korea at 100339 square kilometres (38741 mi^{2}). The park system is the largest transboundary protected area in the world.

It is home to a number of notable landforms, including the world's largest non-polar icefield; the largest piedmont glacier in the world, Malaspina Glacier; the world's longest interior valley glacier, Nabesna Glacier; as well as Canada's highest peak and North America's second-highest peak, Mount Logan, at 5,959 m (19,551 ft).

== Park system ==
The international system comprises parks located in two countries and three administrative regions:

- Kluane National Park and Reserve (Canada)
- Wrangell–St. Elias National Park and Preserve (U.S.)
- Glacier Bay National Park and Preserve (U.S.)
- Tatshenshini-Alsek Provincial Park (provincial park, British Columbia, Canada)

Tatshenshini-Alsek Provincial Park is managed in cooperation with the Champagne and Aishihik First Nations.

== Wildlife and biodiversity ==
The Kluane / Wrangell–St. Elias / Glacier Bay / Tatshenshini-Alsek park system serves as an important habitat for many species including grizzly bears, glacier bears, wolverines, caribou, marbled murrelets, and Kittlitz's murrelet. The park system also holds the largest concentrated population of Dall sheep in the world.

The park system was previously used as a site for commercial fishing. However, commercial fishing activities have been phased out as of 2023. Species targeted for commercial fishing in the area included salmon, Tanner crab, Red king crab, and Pacific halibut.

Plant species that can be found within the park system includes the white spruce (Picea glauca), Alaska Nagoon berry (Rubus articus stellatus), the wedge-leaved primrose (Primula cuneifolia saxifragifolia), and the fragile sedge (Carex membranacea).

== See also ==
- Waterton–Glacier International Peace Park, the other U.S.–Canada World Heritage Site.
