= Geography of aging =

Geography of aging or gerontological geography is an emerging field of knowledge of human geography that analyzes the socio-spatial implications of aging of the population from the understanding of the relationships between the physical-social environment and the elderly, at different scales, micro (city, region, country), etc.

Since the 1970s in a number of developed countries such as the United States, Canada, the United Kingdom, Germany, Sweden, France, Spain, Australia, New Zealand and Japan, there have been increasing studies focusing on the understanding of spatial patterns of aging population, as well as aspects related to residential changes and provision of health and social services. Among the geographers of aging is S. Harper, who identified the phenomenon of aging associated with the social construction of old age and the processes of residential mobility of this group to the urban periphery, mainly nursing homes and sheltered housing.

The contribution of geographers of aging, such as Graham D. Rowles, SM. Golant, S. Harper, G. Laws, are contributing to environmental gerontology by understanding the environmental aspects of gerontology in developed and developing countries. Also in Spain, some geographers, such as Gloria Fernández-Mayoralas, Fermina Rojo-Pérez and Vicente Rodríguez-Rodríguez, have made outstanding contributions to the study of residential strategies, access to health services, and, in general, quality of Life of the elderly, as well as the impacts of Northern European retirees on the Costa del Sol, Spain.

In Latin America and Spain, Diego Sánchez-González has shed light on the deepening of issues such as the physical-built and social environment and the quality of life of the elderly; the importance of the natural environment (therapeutic natural landscape) on active and healthy aging in the place; residential strategies for the maintenance of the elderly in the communities; the socio-environmental vulnerability of the elderly in the face of climate change; as well as issues related to the attachment to the place (identity and public space); elderly people with disabilities and social exclusion; leisure and tourism of elderly; and the planning of gerontological and geriatric services.
