= Donjek =

Donjek may refer to:

- Donjek Glacier, a glacier in Kluane National Park, Yukon, Canada
- Donjek River, a river in Yukon, Canada, see Yukon River
