= Dry Bay, Alaska =

Fishing community and geographic feature

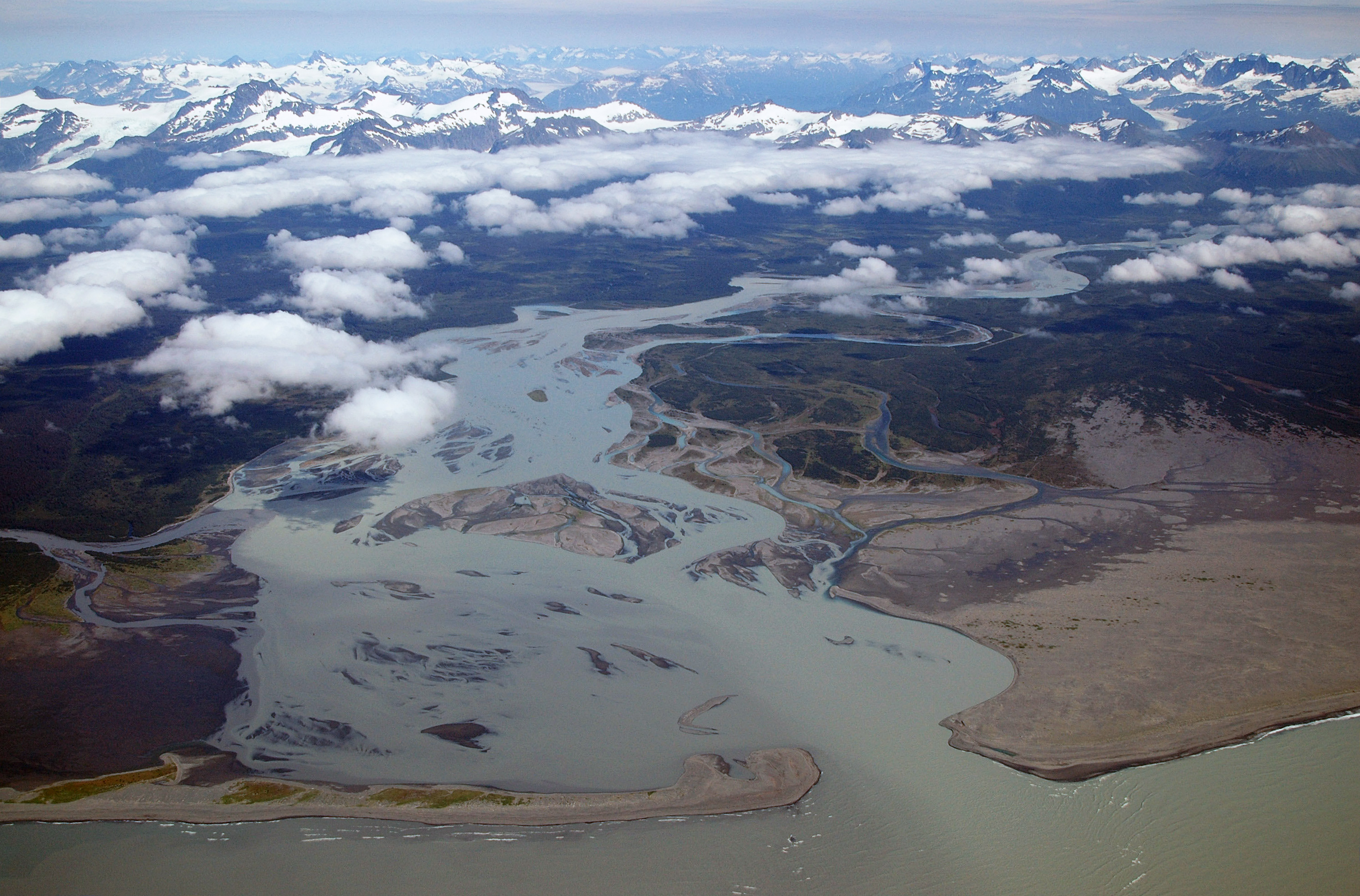

Dry Bay, Alaska is a landform and a summer fishing community located on the northeast shore of the Gulf of Alaska, 48 miles (77 km) southeast of Yakutat. Dry Bay lies along the Alsek River, one of the boundaries of Glacier Bay National Park.

According to the U.S. National Park Service, "5 miles (8.0 km) from sea, the Alsek River breaks into meandering channels fanning out over an 80 square miles (210 km^{2}) delta, known locally as Dry Bay. The name Dry Bay derives from the fact portions of the delta became dry at ebb tide and when river levels are low." According to the U.S. Geological Survey's Geographic Names Information System, it was named in 1869 by the U.S. Coast Survey "because it appeared to be a shallow lagoon fed by silt-laden glacial streams." Capt. James Cook had previously recorded it in 1778 as "Beering's Bay" as he thought that Vitus Bering anchored there in 1741.
