= Kluane National Park and Reserve =

National park and park reserve in Yukon, Canada

- Parc national et réserve de parc national Kluane
- IUCN category II (national park)
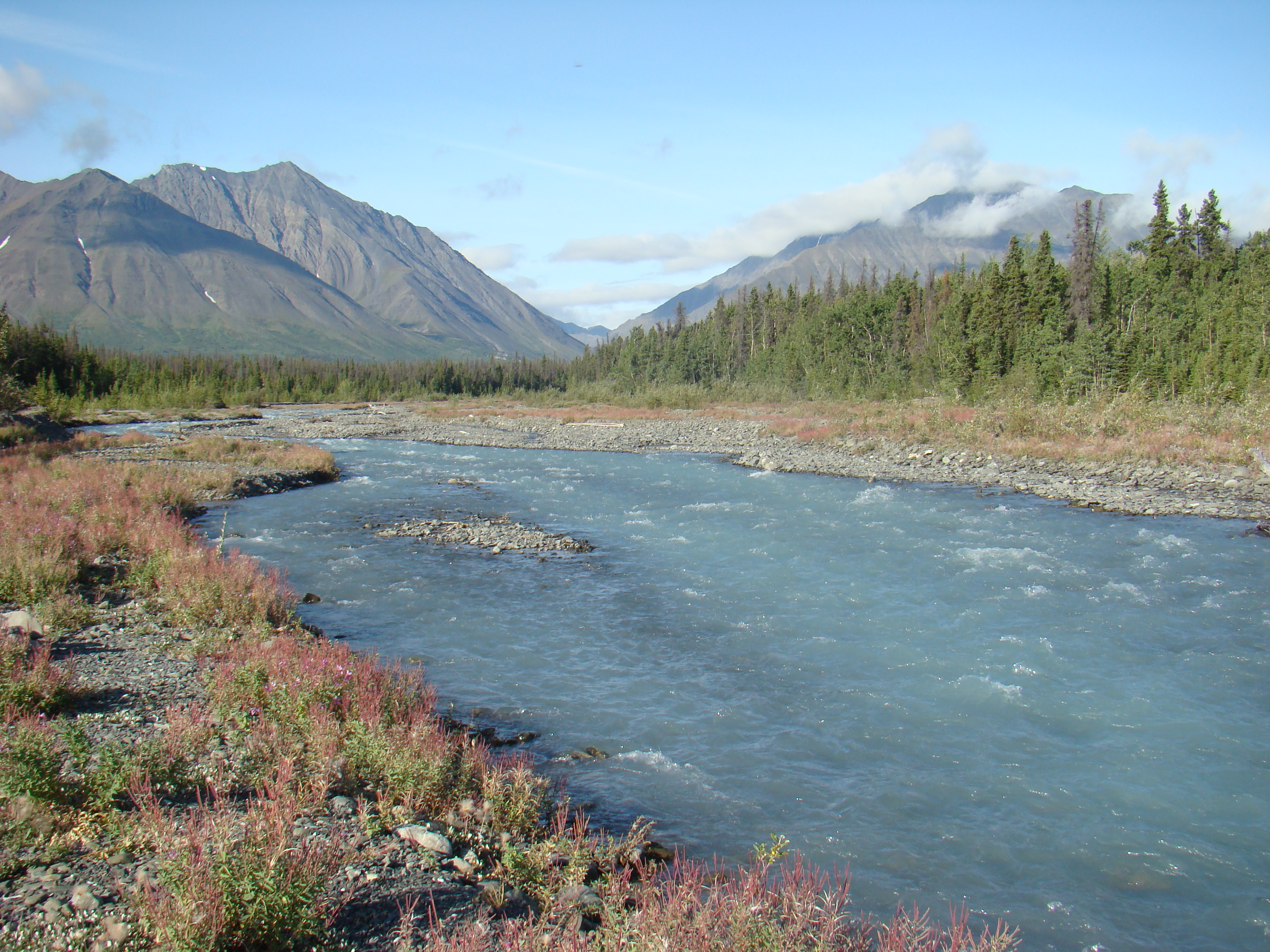
- Quill Creek

- Location within Canada
- Interactive map of Kluane National Park and Reserve
- Location: Yukon, Canada
- Nearest city: Haines Junction
- Coordinates: 60°37′10″N 138°19′52″W
- Area: 5,900 km^{2} (2,300 sq mi) (park) 22,013 km^{2} (8,499 sq mi) (total)
- Established: 1972 as a National Park Reserve. May 29, 1993: an eastern portion of the Reserve became a National Park; the rest continues as a Reserve
- Visitors: 47,098 (in 2022–23)
- Governing body: Parks Canada
- Website: Kluane National Park and Reserve

UNESCO World Heritage Site
- Part of: Kluane / Wrangell-St. Elias / Glacier Bay / Tatshenshini-Alsek
- Criteria: Natural: (vii), (viii), (ix), (x)
- Reference: 72
- Inscription: 1979 (3rd Session)
- Extensions: 1992, 1994

Kluane National Park and Reserve (/kluːˈɑːniː/; French: Parc national et réserve de parc national de Kluane) are two protected areas in the southwest corner of the territory of Yukon. The National Park Reserve was set aside in 1972 to become a national park, pending settlement of First Nations land claims. It covered an area of 22,013 square kilometres (8,499 square miles). When agreement was reached with the Champagne and Aishihik First Nations over an eastern portion of the Reserve, that part—about 5,900 square kilometres (2,300 square miles)—became a national park in 1993, and is a unit of the national park system administered co-operatively with Parks Canada. The larger western section remains a Reserve, awaiting a final land claim settlement with the Kluane First Nation. The park borders British Columbia to the south, while the Reserve borders both British Columbia to the south, and the United States (Alaska) to the south and west.

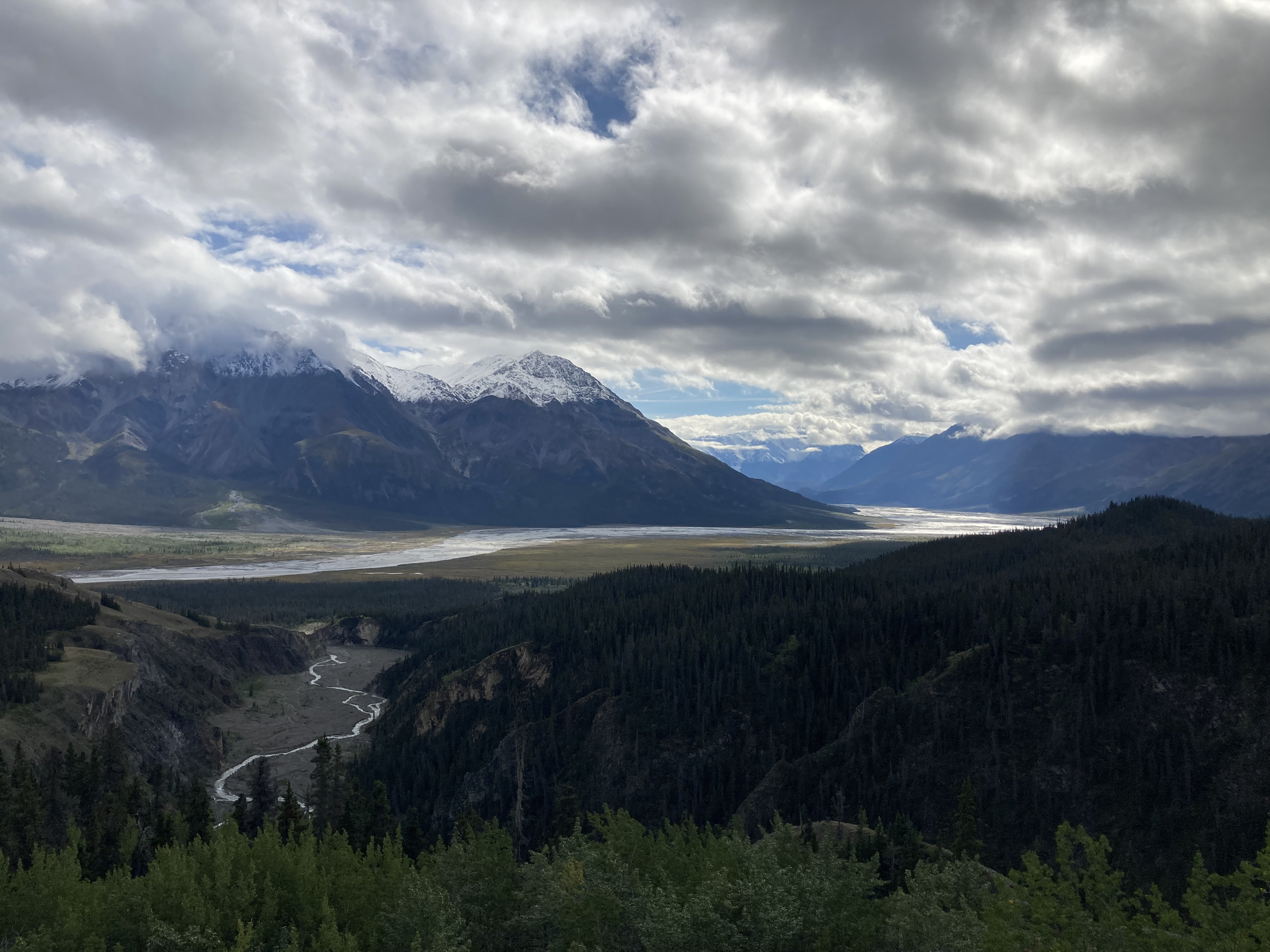
Slim's River Valley

The Reserve includes the highest mountain in Canada, Mount Logan (5,959 metres or 19,551 feet) of the Saint Elias Mountains. Mountains and glaciers, including Donjek Glacier, dominate the park's landscape, covering 83% of its area. The rest of the land in the park is forest and tundra—east of the largest mountains and glaciers—where the climate is colder and drier than in the western and southern parts of the park. Trees grow only at the park's lowest elevations. The primary tree species are white spruce, balsam poplar and trembling aspen.

== Activities ==
A day-use area with boat launch, picnic facilities and campground is located at Kathleen Lake, and is operated from mid-May to mid-September. Hiking is a popular activity on trails such as St. Elias Lake, Mush Lake Road, Shorty Creek, Cottonwood, Rock Glacier, King's Throne, Kokanee, Auriol, Dezadeash River Trail, Alsek Trail, Sheep Creek Trail, Bullion Plateau Trail, Slims West or Soldiers Summit. Rafting on the Alsek River (a Canadian Heritage river), mountain biking on old mining roads, horseback riding through the Alsek Pass, boating on Kathleen Lake and Mush Lake as well as fishing for lake trout, Arctic grayling, rainbow trout, northern pike and sockeye salmon are also among activities available in the park.

The park was the subject of a short film in 2011's National Parks Project, directed by Louise Archambault and scored by Graham Van Pelt, Ian D'Sa and Mishka Stein.

In August 2013, Robert F. Kennedy, Jr., visited the park to see Mount Kennedy, named as a memorial to his uncle, U.S. president John F. Kennedy.

== Fauna ==
Mammalian species that inhabit this park include Yukon wolf, bear, coyote, mink, lynx, river otter, caribou, Yukon moose, muskrat, snowshoe hare, marmot, red fox, Dall sheep, beaver, wolverine, mountain goat, and arctic ground squirrel. This park contains about 120 species of birds, including the rock ptarmigan and the golden and bald eagles.

=== World Heritage Site ===
The bi-national Kluane-Wrangell-St. Elias-Glacier Bay-Tatshenshini-Alsek park system comprising Kluane, Wrangell-St Elias, Glacier Bay and Tatshenshini-Alsek parks, was declared a UNESCO World Heritage Site in 1979 for the spectacular glacier and icefield landscapes as well as for the importance of grizzly bears, caribou and Dall sheep habitat.

In a 2009 census of the Kluane herd, there were 181 northern mountain caribou, a distinct ecotype of caribou.

=== First Nations presence ===
Kluane National Park lies within the traditional territories of the Champagne and Aishihik First Nations and Kluane First Nation who have a long history of living in this region. Through their respective Final Agreements with the Canadian Government, they have made into law their rights to harvest in this region.

== See also ==
- National Parks of Canada
- List of National Parks of Canada
- List of Yukon parks
- List of World Heritage Sites in the Americas
