= Alsek River =

River in Yukon Territory, British Columbia, and Alaska

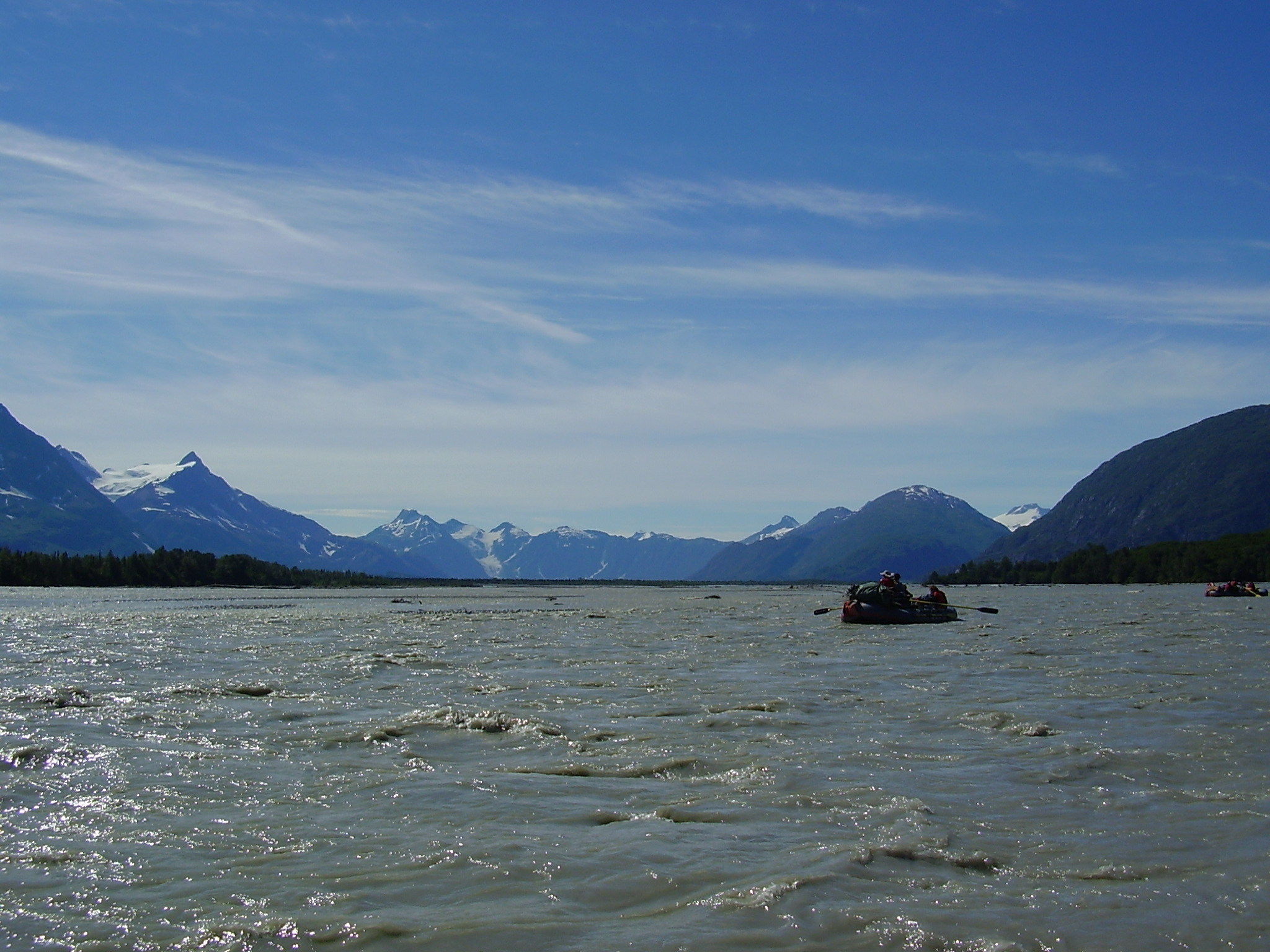
- Confluence of the Alsek and Tatshenshini rivers

- Location of the mouth of the Alsek River in Alaska

Location
- Countries: United States; Canada
- State: Alaska
- Territory: Yukon
- Province: British Columbia

Physical characteristics
- Source: Kluane National Park and Reserve
  - location: Yukon
  - coordinates: 60°38′46″N 137°48′26″W
  - elevation: 562 m (1,844 ft)
- Mouth: Pacific Ocean
  - location: Dry Bay, Yakutat City and Borough, Alaska, Alaska
  - coordinates: 59°7′40″N 138°37′14″W
  - elevation: 0 m (0 ft)
- Length: 290 km (180 mi)
- Basin size: 28,023 km^{2} (10,820 sq mi)
- Discharge
  - average: 862.6 m^{3}/s (30,460 cu ft/s)

Alsek River (/ˈælˌsɛk/; Tlingit Aalseix̱' ) is a wilderness river flowing from Yukon into Northern British Columbia and into Alaska. It enters the Gulf of Alaska at Dry Bay.

Most of the Alsek River's basin is within protected wilderness areas and National Parks. The Alsek and its main tributary, the Tatshenshini River, are part of the Canadian Heritage Rivers System and a UNESCO World Heritage Site.

In the year 2016, the Alsek River captured the flow of the Slims River due to the retreat of Kaskawulsh Glacier. Researchers attributed the change in flow to human-caused climate change; this was the first time human-caused climate change was implicated in the reorganization of a river.

Research indicates that in a few decades, Alsek River may further change its final course. The rapidly retreating Grand Plateau Glacier separates Alsek River and lake from nearby Grand Plateau Lake. Geologists predict that when the two lakes merge, Alsek River will abandon its current outlet in favour of the steeper way to the ocean through Grand Plateau Lake and a small embankment, moving its outlet some 17 miles (27 km) to the southeast, within the confines of Glacier Bay National Park.

== Course ==
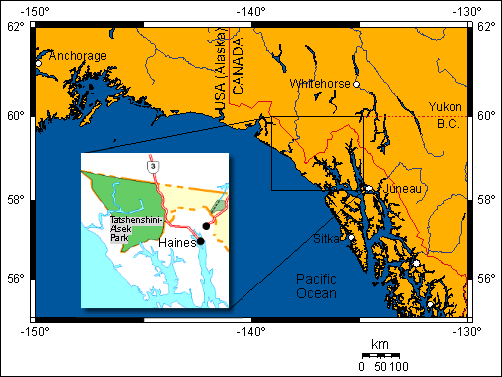
Location of Alsek River

The Alsek starts at the confluence of the Dezadeash River and Kaskawulsh River in Kluane National Park and Reserve. After flowing south into the northwestern tip of British Columbia, it is joined by the Tatshenshini River in Tatshenshini-Alsek Park. Finally after passing through the glacier-fed Alsek Lake, it reaches the Pacific Ocean at Dry Bay, in the Gulf of Alaska, south of Yakutat, Alaska, close to the northern end of the Alaska Panhandle. Although the river is navigable by kayak or rubber raft in its northern reaches, it rapidly becomes unnavigable—for any but the most experienced and skilled kayakers—at Turnback Canyon.

On older maps, the Alsek river is labeled as the Kaskawulsh and The Tatshenshini as the Alsek. Some Yukon First Nation elders also refer to the river as the Kaskawulsh.

The river flows next to the Lowell Glacier which has sometimes blocked off the river and created a large lake behind it, "Neoglacial Lake Alsek". The last such blockage took place in 1850; its release created a massive flood, washing away everything in its path on the way to the Pacific.

The river carries much silt from the Alsek Lake/Glacier, which contributes to the river's low temperature.

The Alsek and nearby East Alsek rivers were at one time connected, and the old river bed can still be made out on some maps.

The Alsek Glacier contacts the Grand Plateau Glacier, which faces the shoreline. Also in the same general area are the Doame foothills and Doame River.

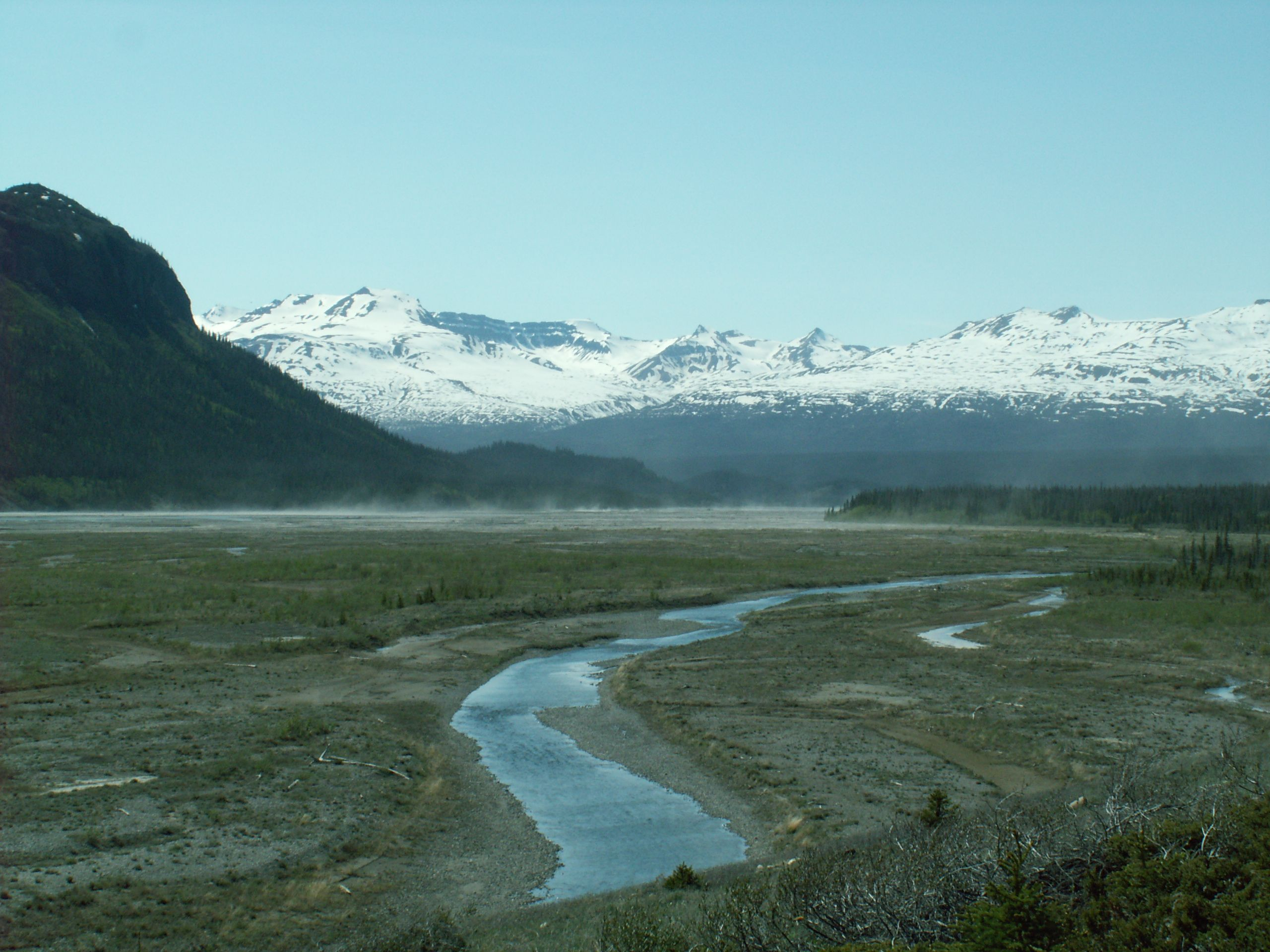
Alsek River (in distance) near junction with Sugden Creek inside Kluane National Park

== History ==
The first known kayak descent of Turnback Canyon was by Walt Blackadar, who ran the canyon solo on August 25, 1971. He wrote about his trip for Sports Illustrated. "This has been a day!," he wrote in his journal. "I want any other kayaker or would-be expert to read my words well. The Alsek Gorge is unpaddleable!" Despite this sincere warning from a man who apparently felt lucky to be alive, groups of expert kayakers have successfully run Turnback Canyon since then. A prominent mountain which overlooks the Alsek was named Mount Blackadar in his honor.

The portion of the river inside Kluane National Park has been designated a Canadian Heritage River.

In 1958, a magnitude 7.7 earthquake centered near Lituya bay significantly changed the lay of the land. The earthquake caused the Doame River and East Alsek River to join together.

In the year 2016, after capturing the flow of the Slims River, the Alsek River's flow increased dramatically.

=== Fishing ===
The Alsek and East Alsek rivers are a part of the Yakutat area limited entry set gillnet fishery. Both rivers produce king, silver, and sockeye commercially. Chum and pink salmon can also be caught, but are not generally sought after due to their relative lack of worth/quality. These two rivers can be characterized as low volume fisheries, while the Alsek river in particular produces particularly high quality salmon due to its low temperature. The Alsek's high silt content also prevents the sun from damaging the fish.

The area also supports subsistence and sport fishing, as well as multiple sight-seeing, hunting, and animal watching lodges.

== See also ==
- List of rivers of Alaska
- List of rivers of Yukon
- List of rivers of British Columbia
- List of rivers of the Americas by coastline
