= Tatshenshini River =

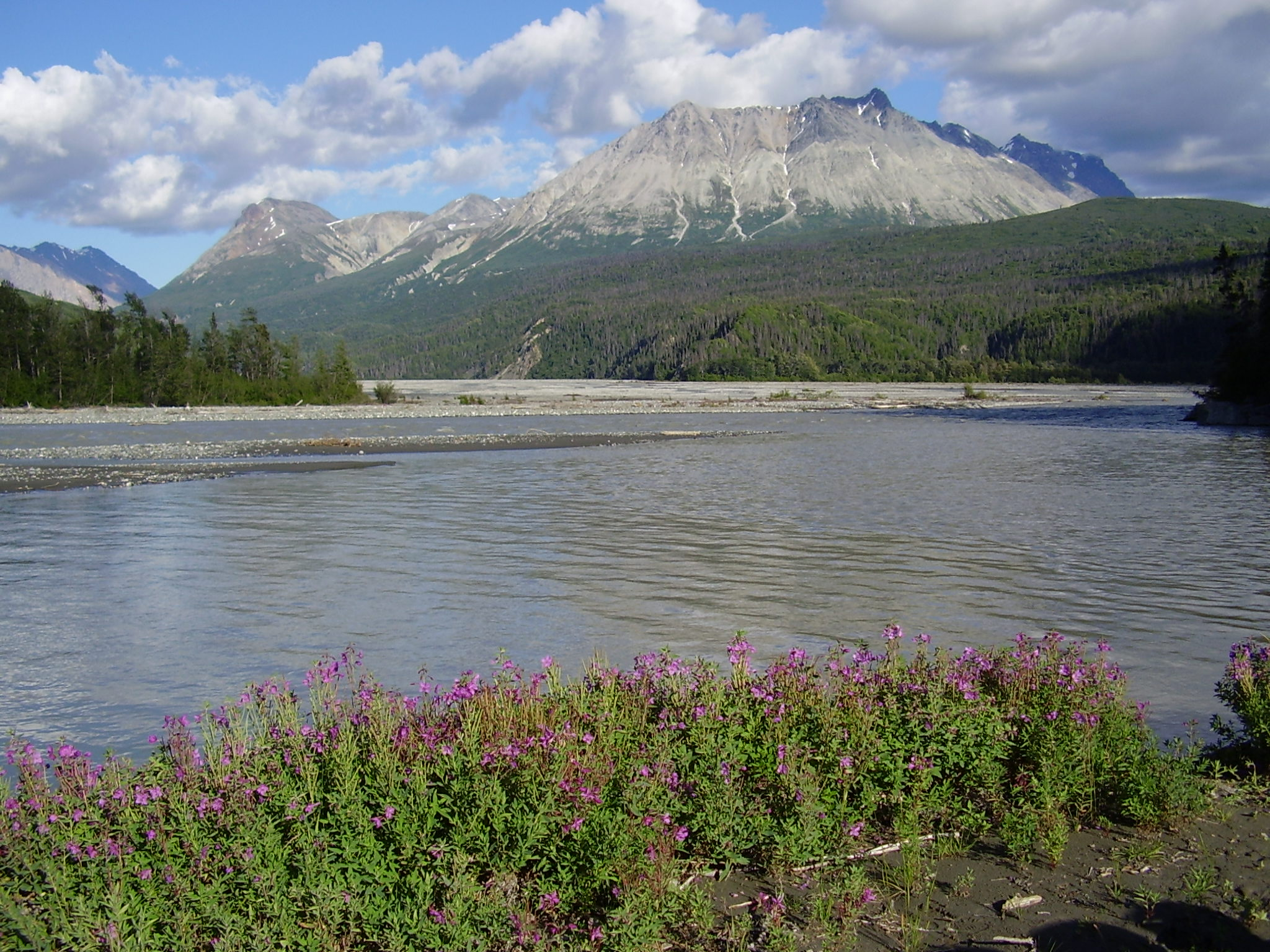
- O'Connor Creek delta in the Tatshenshini River in British Columbia

Location
- Country: Canada

Physical characteristics
- Source
  - location: Datlasaka Creek
  - coordinates: 59.84167°N 136.66066°W
  - elevation: 910 m (2,990 ft)
- Mouth
  - location: Alsek River
  - coordinates: 59.47894°N 137.76555°W
  - elevation: 120 m (390 ft)

The Tatshenshini River (/ˌtætʃɛnˈʃiːni/; Tlingit Tʼachanshahéeni, Southern Tutchone Shäwshe Chù) is a river in the Canadian boreal forest, in the southwestern Yukon and the northwestern corner of British Columbia. It originates in British Columbia, near Haines Highway. It flows north into Yukon, then it turns west and south before it returns into British Columbia, where it flows through the Tatshenshini-Alsek Provincial Wilderness Park. There it joins the Alsek River, which then flows into the Pacific Ocean in Alaska, United States. It is popular for wilderness rafting trips.

== History ==
This river was used as a vital trade route by First Nations, in particular the coastal Tlingit people. The first Europeans to travel the present-day Tatshenshini River were Jack Dalton and Edward Glave in 1890, accompanied by two native guides. Prior to 1891, the present-day Tatshenshini River was considered to be the upper Alsek River. (At that time, the present-day upper Alsek River was considered to be the lower Kaskawulsh River.) In or about 1891, the present-day Tatshenshini River (pre-1891 upper Alsek River) was assigned the name Tatshenshini by the Canadian government, and the pre-1891 lower Kaskawulsh River became the present-day upper Alsek River.

About 1897, Jack Dalton established a trading post near the location where the present-day Tatshenini begins to flow westward. This trading post flourished during the Klondike Gold Rush. Today, the site of Dalton's trading post is a popular location for salmon fishermen, and it is the launch point for rafting trips on the Tatshenshini River. The Tatshenshini River was designated a Canadian Heritage River in 2004.

== Etymology ==
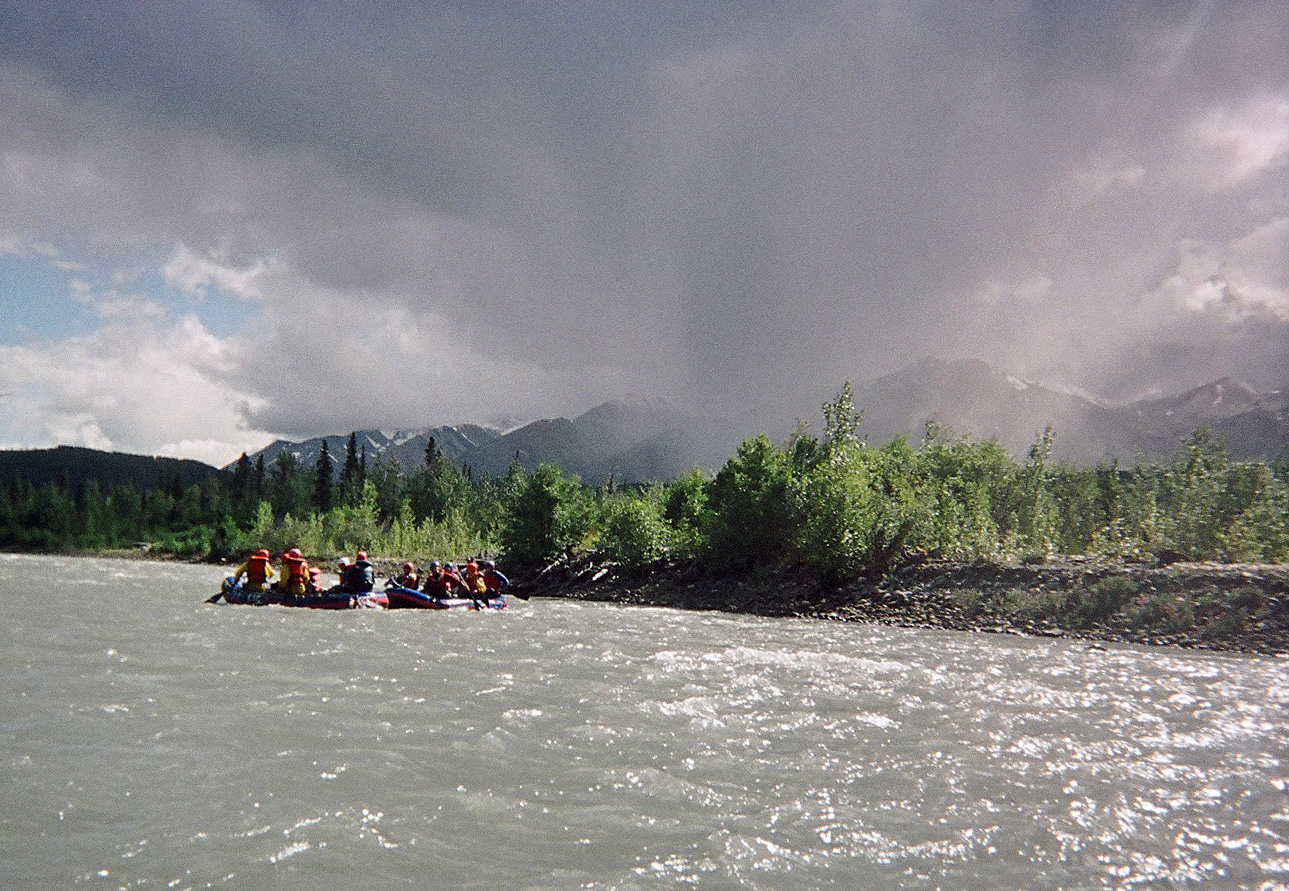
Localised rain shower on the river

Prior to 1891, the name Tatshenshini did not refer to the present-day Tatshenshini River. Instead, the name referred to the present-day Blanchard River, which is a tributary of the present-day Tatshenshini River, located about 10 miles (16 km) upstream from Dalton's trading post. In 1891, or shortly thereafter, the Canadian government reassigned the name Tatshenshini from the present-day Blanchard River to the present-day Tatshenshini River. Apparently, the government did this without knowledge of the English translation of tatshenshini.

The name Tatshenshini is derived from a Tlingit phrase, the meaning of which was not recorded. However, the original phrase appears to have been t’áchán shahéeni, a compound Tlingit noun meaning river with stinking chinook (king) salmon at its headwaters (t’á [chinook or king salmon] + chán [stink] + sha [head of] + héen [river] + i [possessed noun suffix] ).

The Tlingit phrase t’áchán shahéeni describes the present-day Blanchard River (pre-1891 Tatshenshini River). Chinook (king) salmon run up the present-day Tatshenshini River to the Blanchard River and, thence, up the Blanchard River. At the headwaters (shahéen) of the Blanchard River, the salmon (t’á) die, and their carcasses stink (chán). These headwaters were on the old Tlingit trail and trade route between Haines, Alaska and Lake Kusawa, Yukon.

== See also ==
- List of rivers of British Columbia
- List of rivers of Yukon
- Tatshenshini-Alsek Park
- Alsek River
