= Otto Schlüter =

German geographer

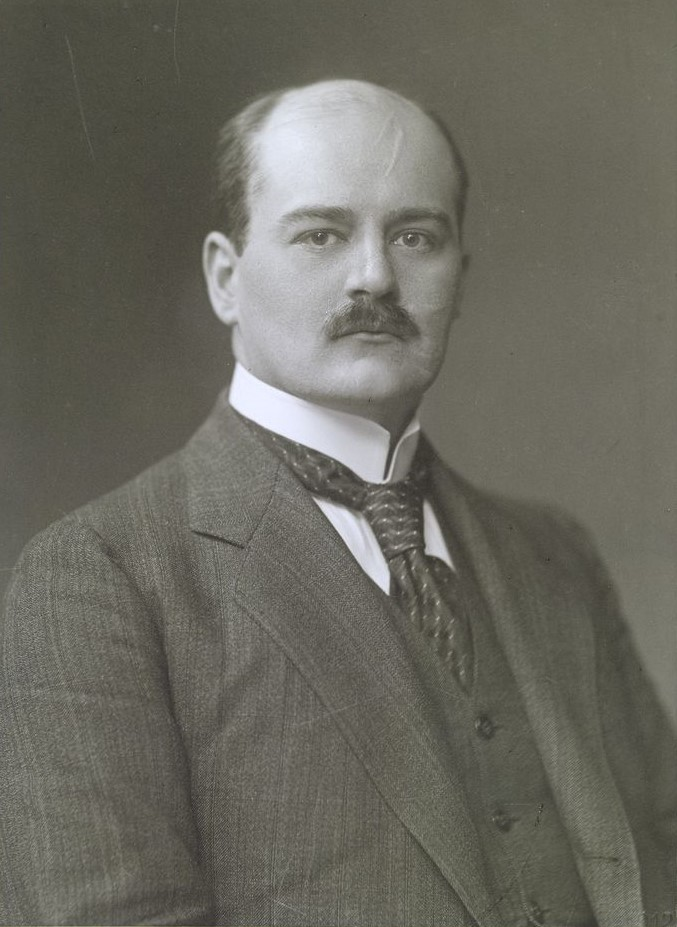
Schlüter in 1911

Otto Schlüter (12 November 1872 in Witten – 12 October 1959 in Halle) was a German geographer. Schlüter was a professor of geography at the University of Halle from 1911 until his death. He is credited with creation of the term cultural landscape, which is one of the turning points of geographical history.

== Early life and education ==
Otto Schlüter studied geography, geology, mineralogy, and philosophy between 1891 and 1898, first in Freiburg im Breisgau, and later in Halle and Berlin. After teaching at the University of Berlin and University of Bonn, in 1911 he became a professor of geography at the University of Halle.
