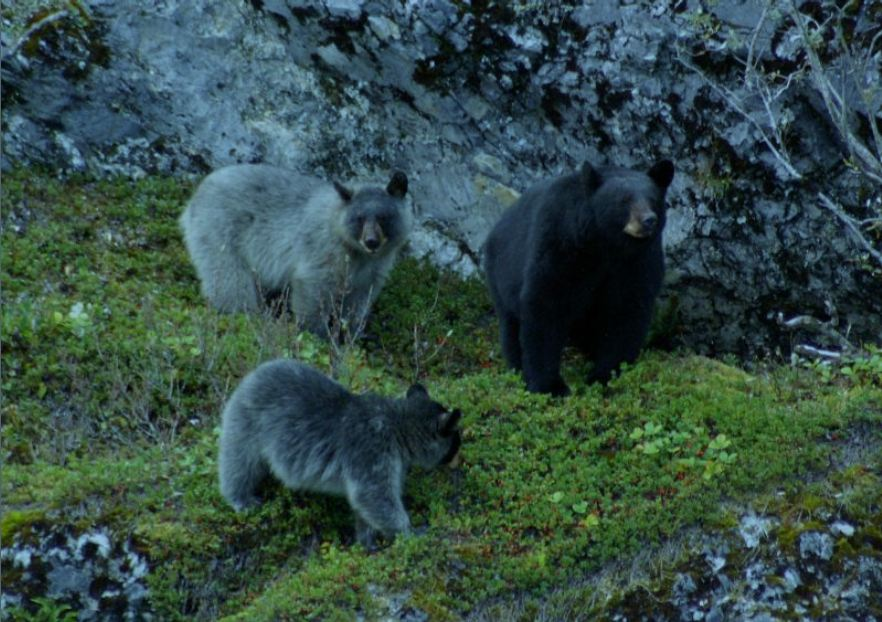
- A black bear with glacier bear cubs

Conservation status
- Vulnerable (NatureServe)

Scientific classification
- Kingdom: Animalia
- Phylum: Chordata
- Class: Mammalia
- Order: Carnivora
- Family: Ursidae
- Genus: Ursus
- Species: U. americanus
- Subspecies: U. a. emmonsii

Trinomial name
- Ursus americanus emmonsii Dall, 1895

= Glacier bear =

Subspecies of carnivore

The glacier bear (Ursus americanus emmonsii), sometimes referred to as the "blue bear", is a subspecies of American black bear with silver-blue or gray hair endemic from Southeast Alaska, to the extreme northwestern tip of British Columbia, and to the extreme southwest of the Yukon. The Tlingit name for the glacier bear is a reference to their size, elusiveness, and ability to visually blend into snowfields: "sik noon", which means "a bear that disappears". Little scientific knowledge exists of their total extent and the cause of their unique coloration. Most other black bears in southeast Alaska are listed under the subspecies Ursus americanus pugnax. The USDA Forest Service lists U. a. emmonsii as one of several subspecies of black bears, although no evidence supports the subspecies designation other than hair coloration.

== Unique features ==
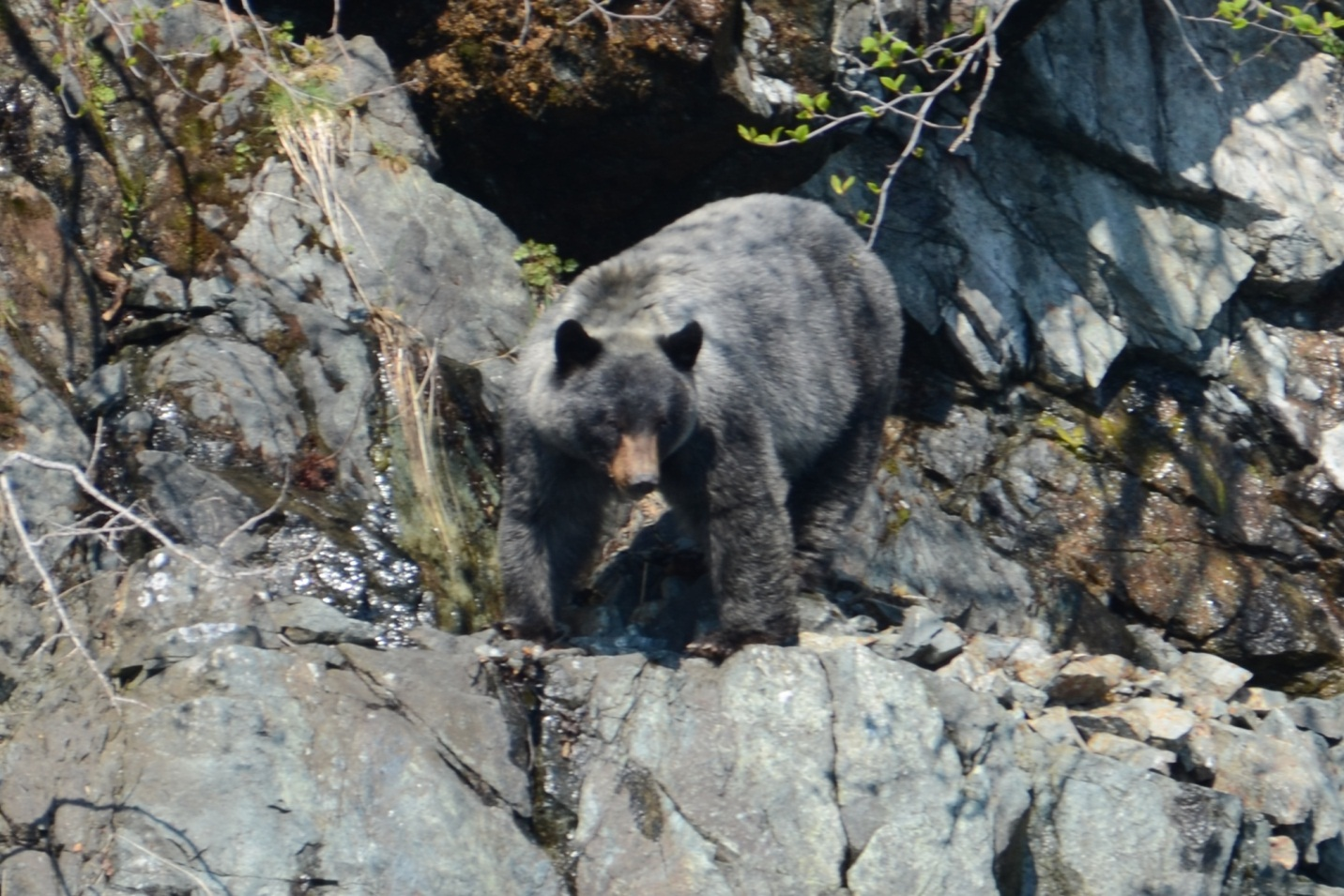
U. a. emmonsii

The chief feature distinguishing the glacier bear from other black bears is its pelage (hair coloration), which ranges from silvery blue to gray. The subspecies was reported by William Healey Dall in 1895. This variation can be seen on individual bears that are often lighter on their backs and shoulders, with their legs and belly being much darker or even black.

== Habitat and range ==
The glacier bear's habitat ranges have been reported to be the Alaskan coastal areas between Cross Sound and Cape St. Elias and from Prince William Sound to Glacier Bay in southeast Alaska, with a few sightings as far east as Juneau, Alaska, and the Taku River that flows between British Columbia and Alaska. This region includes Glacier Bay National Park and portions of Tongass National Forest, a temperate rainforest preserve. Glacier bears have also been reported in the extreme northwestern tip of British Columbia and to the extreme southwest of the Yukon. Few studies document the subspecies' range in association with other black bears. See for instance Hall's 1981 The Mammals of North America.

Glacier bears share most of the characteristics of black bears such as their habitat preferences, food sources, size, and reproductive cycles. They prefer forest with thick understory and landscapes with abundant vegetation, but can be found in urban populated areas. The glacier bear habitat is dependent upon food source availability, and they move between forest, meadows, streams, and mountains in search of food and shelter. Black bears in general are very capable climbers and can use trees as a place of protection and refuge. Glacier bears move into their dens in early winter, which can be an overturned tree, a rock ledge, or a cave.

== Diet ==
Glacier bears, like all other black bears, are omnivores, with their diets varying depending on the food source available during the season and the location. Their diet includes young shoots and roots in early spring. During the summer in Alaska, the glacier bear eats the abundant Pacific salmon spawning in the streams. In some areas, moose and deer are a food source for black bears. During the fall, the bears eat the starchy roots of ground cones and the variety of berries found in Alaska such as blueberries, salmonberries, raspberries, and cranberries.

== Reproduction ==
Breeding habits are much like any other black bear. The glacier bear female normally has her first litter by 3–5 years of age. This breeding period takes place in June through July. Gestation lasts 235 days and cubs are born in January to early February. Because of the increasing range of all subspecies of black bears since the last glacier maximum, interbreeding is taking place. It is thus possible to see a black-colored bear give birth to a bear with the glacier bears' pelage and vice versa.

== Research ==
Very little is known about this rare color variation, so some potential threats could become an issue for the glacier bear. Some of these threats are overharvesting and gene swamping. Currently, no population projections are made due to the lack of genetic understanding. With the interbreeding capabilities of other black bears with different pelage, determining the future distinctive color variation and population density may become even more complicated. Also, speculation exists that the glacier bear had its origins in hybrids between black bears and grizzlies.
