= Donjek Glacier =

Glacier in Yukon, Canada

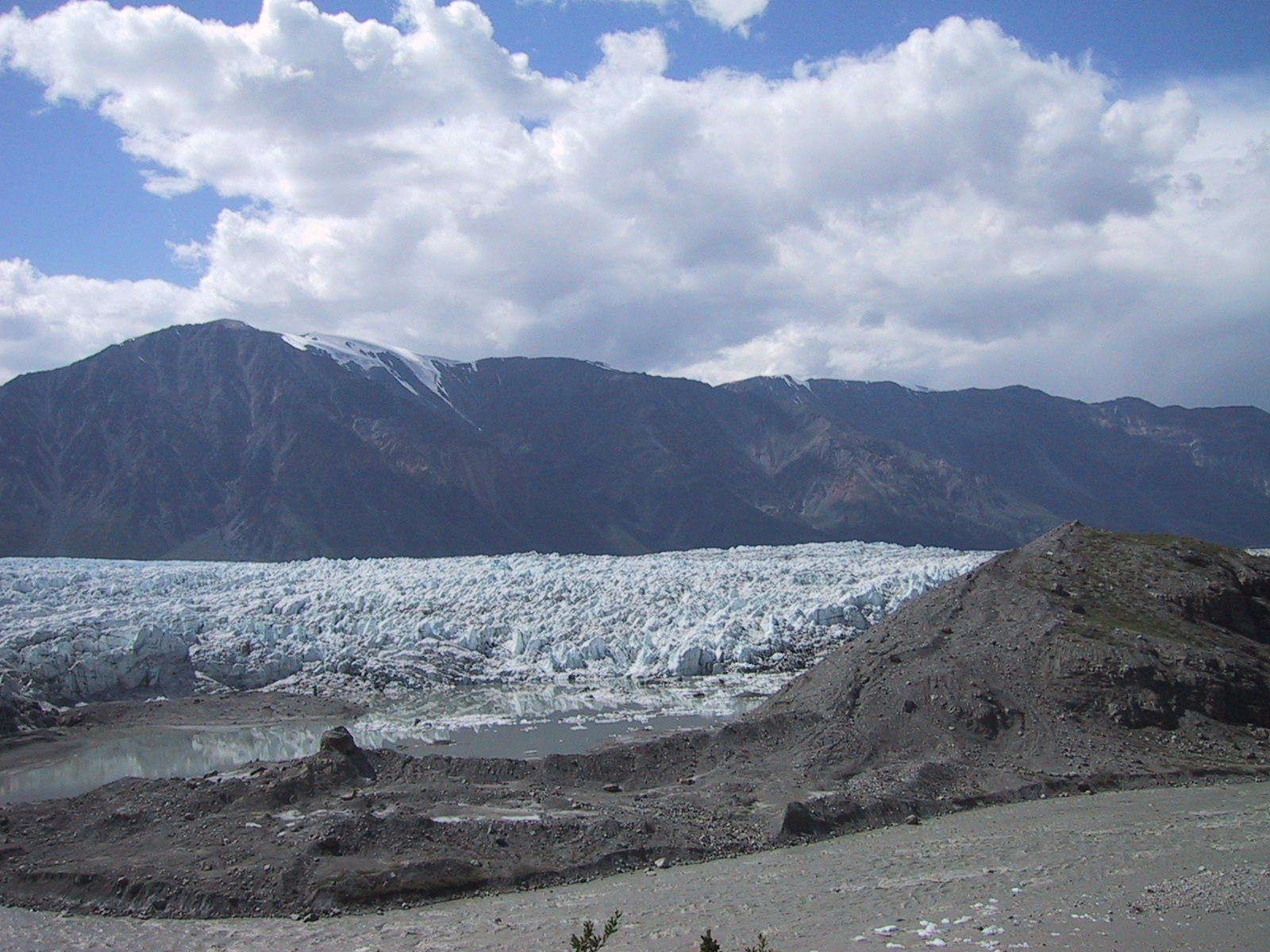
- Interactive map of Donjek Glacier
- Type: Piedmont valley glacier
- Location: Yukon, Canada
- Coordinates: 61.12°N 139.75°W
- Length: 3,500 ft (1,100 m)
- Terminus: moraine
- Status: unknown

Donjek Glacier (Southern Tutchone: Dän Zhǘr) is located in Kluane National Park, in Yukon, Canada, on the eastern side of the Saint Elias Mountains. Donjek Glacier is about 35 miles (56 km) long and extends into the Donyek River Valley 3,500 feet (1,100 m) to its terminus. Centuries ago Donjek Glacier formed a dam, creating Donjek Lake which is estimated to have been 230 x 106 m^{3}.

In 1970 a study was performed at the terminus of the glacier to determine its position during the Holocene climatic optimum but the study found no evidence in the valley that the glacier had retreated from the Donyek River Valley. However there is evidence that the glacier had retreated before it advanced during the neoglaciation. Near the river bed there is also an area of 4–5 feet (1.2–1.5 m) high mounds whose surfaces have been worn by the river. Inside the mounds there is a large amount of groundmass, which indicates the mounds may have been formed of till originally. This suggests Donjek Glacier was much larger than it is now as the mounds would have gone through much erosion.

In 1978 Donjek Glacier went through a minor surge but failed to block the Donjek River. In 1998 a subglacial tunnel in Donjek Glacier collapsed after an outbreak of water flooded the area. The collapse created a 50-metre (160 ft) wide ice canyon.
