= Champagne and Aishihik First Nations =

Champagne and Aishihik
Total population
- Enrolled members

Regions with significant populations
- Canada Yukon

Languages
- English, Southern Tutchone (endangered)

Religion
- Christianity (incl. syncretistic forms)

Related ethnic groups
- Coastal Northwest tribes

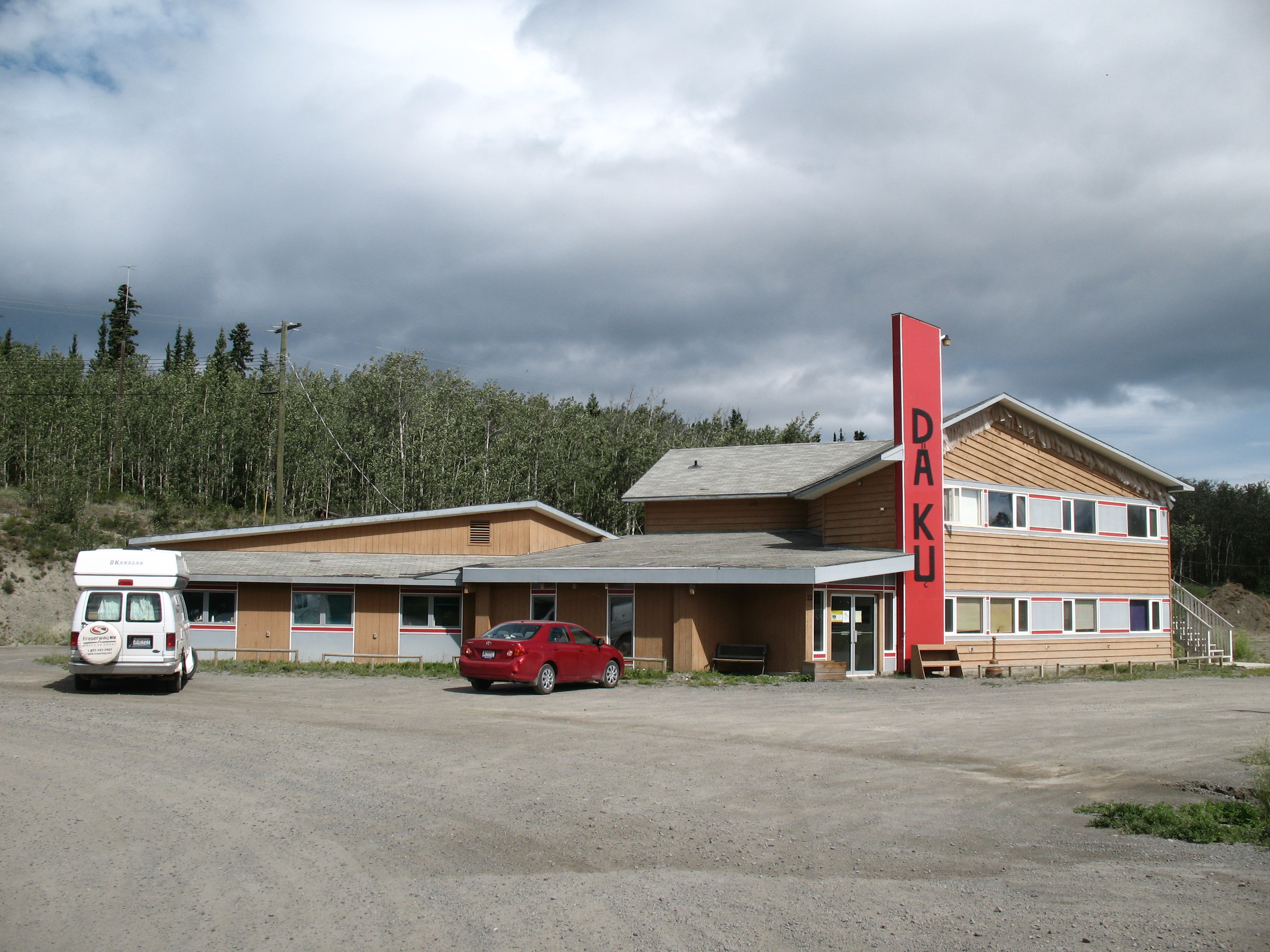
Information Centre Building

The Champagne and Aishihik First Nations (CAFN) is a First Nation band government in Yukon, Canada. Historically its original population centres were Champagne (home of the Kwächä̀l kwächʼǟn - "Champagne people/band") and Aishihik (home of the Äshèyi kwächʼǟn - ″Aishihik people/band″), with bands active in both coastal and interior areas.

Most of its citizens have moved to Haines Junction to take advantage of services offered there, such as schools. The First Nation government has its main administrative offices there. Other settlements used included Klukshu. Many also live in Whitehorse where the First Nation government has offices. The language originally spoken by the Champagne and Aishihik people was Southern Tutchone.

The Champagne and Aishihik First Nations was one of the first four First Nations to sign a land claims agreement in 1992. The First Nation is also pursuing a land claim in its traditional territory in the northwestern corner of British Columbia.

== History ==
In 1999, the mummified remains of a man were found by a group of hunters in a glacier in Tatshenshini-Alsek Park in British Columbia, Canada. Radiocarbon dating of artifacts found with the body placed its age at between 300 and 550 years. Researchers contacted Champagne and Aishihik First Nations about the find before making any announcement. Their representatives visited the site and named the body as Kwäday Dän Ts'ìnchi, "Long Ago Man Found" in their language of Southern Tutchone.

DNA and other scientific testing was done with the agreement of the First Nations representatives. In 2007, mitochondrial DNA testing of 241 area volunteers of the Champagne and Aishihik First Nations revealed 17 living persons who are related to Kwäday Dän Ts'ìnchi through their direct maternal line. Among them were Sheila Clark and Pearl Callaghan, two of seven sisters. Clark said of the findings, "It was extremely moving. I couldn't believe it."

Fifteen of the 17 related individuals identify as Wolf clan, suggesting the man may also have belonged to the Wolf clan. In the matrilineal kinship system, children are considered born into their mother's clan and descent is figured by the mother's line. The individuals were split roughly in half between those who lived in coastal areas and those who lived inland, reflecting historic territories of bands. As arranged by the Champagne and Aishihik First Nations, after the tests they had the remains of the man cremated and buried with ceremony near where they were found in Tatshenshini-Alsek Park.

== Demographics ==
In the 2021 Census of Population conducted by Statistics Canada, Champagne Landing 10 had a population of 22 living in 17 of its 30 total private dwellings, a change of 10% from its 2016 population of 20. With a land area of 4.82 km^{2} (1.86 sq mi), it had a population density of 4.6/km^{2} (11.8/sq mi) in 2021.
