= Tourism in Canada =

Tourism activity, 2024
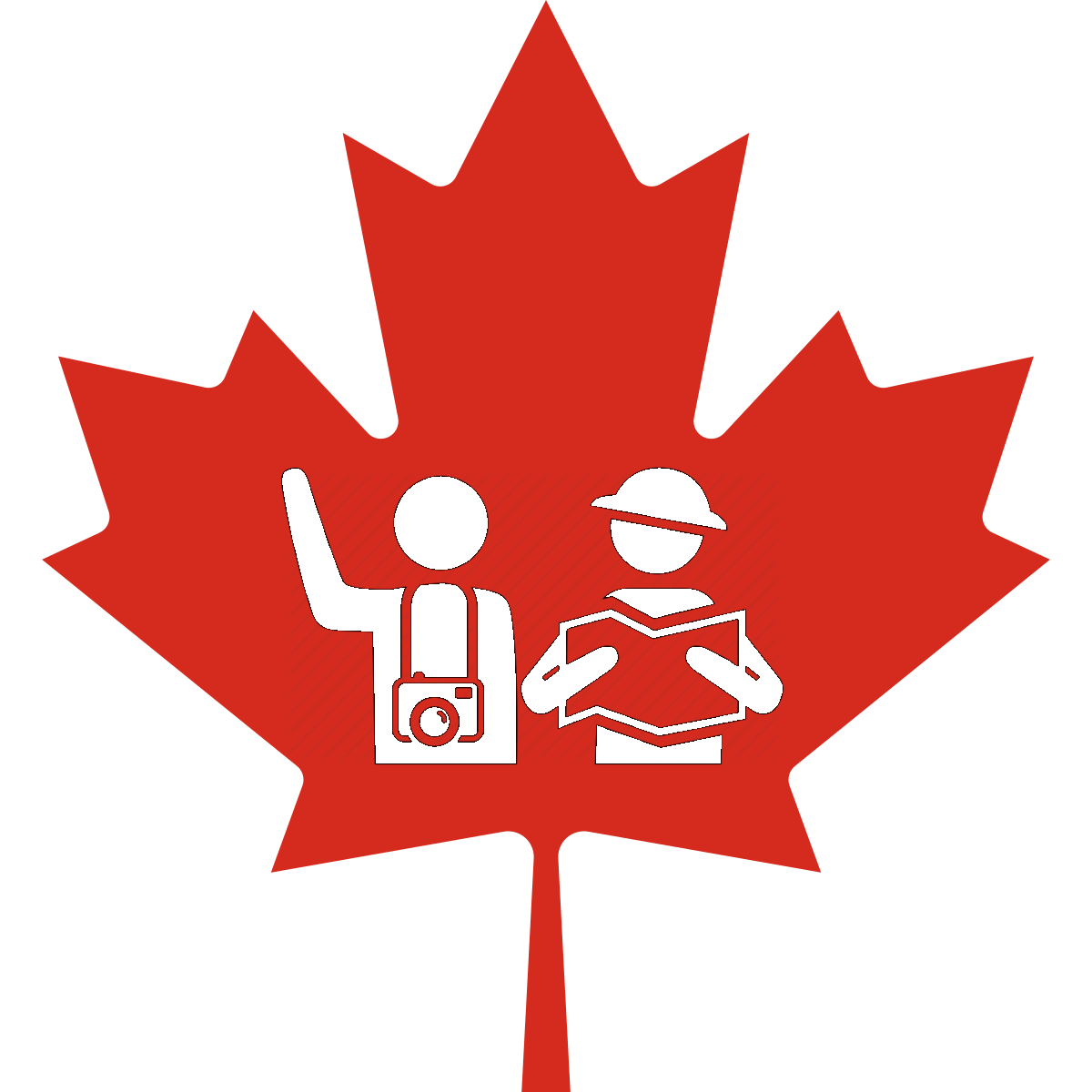
- Economic impact
- Total revenues: $104.4 to $129.7 billion
- Contribution to GDP: $41.0 to $50.8 billion
- Portion of GDP: 1.8%
- Top spending by source
- Domestic: $74.8 billion
- U.S. residents: $15.6 billion
- Overseas residents: $12.9 billion
- Trips from abroad
- Total: 29.8 million
- United States: 23.46 million
- United Kingdom: 843,000
- France: 642,000
- India: 439,000
- Mexico: 432,000
- Workforce
- Businesses: 265,800
- Direct jobs: 702,700
- All jobs: 1.8 million
- Portion of labor force: 10%

Tourism in Canada is a major economic driver in the service sector, attracting millions of visitors and supporting approximately 10% of the national labor force. In recent years, statistics show that Canada has received over 20 million international tourists annually. The summer months are especially popular for travellers both domestically and internationally. Tourism and supporting industries contributed over $100 billion to the Canadian national economy in 2024. The sector supports nearly 1.8 million Canadians working in tourism-related fields.

Domestic tourism in Canada is the principal economic driver of the sector, with statistics indicating that, in 2024, about 70% of all tourism spending came from Canadian residents exploring their own country. Domestic statistics also indicate that travel within provinces is prevalent, with residents supporting local businesses and attractions. Land border crossings by United States citizens has historically been the largest source of inbound tourists, followed by international airline travel from the United Kingdom and other European countries. Visitors from Asia have become more popular in recent decades. Passport holders from over 50 visa-exempt countries and nationals who require a visa can visit Canada for up to six months at a time.

Federal, provincial, municipal and local government initiatives aimed at promoting sustainable tourism and attracting foreign tourists play a major role in the industry. Canada is known for its safety and security, attracting tourists through its natural features (e.g., Niagara Falls), festivals (e.g., Calgary stampede), arts (e.g., Toronto International Film Festival), heritage sites, (e.g., Quebec City) sporting events (e.g.,Grey Cup), amusement parks (e.g., Canada's Wonderland) and its diverse culture (e.g., Caribbean Carnival).

Canada's national parks like Banff and Jasper see millions of visitors annually, drawn by their landscapes and outdoor activities. Provincial parks including Algonquin Provincial Park, Bow Valley Provincial Park and Cabot Beach Provincial Park also attract a multitude of visitors annually. Natural wonders such as, Great Bear Rainforest, the Northern Lights, Hopewell Rocks, Sandbanks and Moraine Lake attract a variety of international and domestic tourist throughout the year. The country is home to numerous historical and cultural national museums and galleries, such as the Canadian Museum of History, Canadian Museum for Human Rights and National Gallery of Canada. Provincial museums that attract significance amount of tourist include, the Royal Ontario Museum, the Royal British Columbia Museum and the Nova Scotia museum system.

== Statistics ==
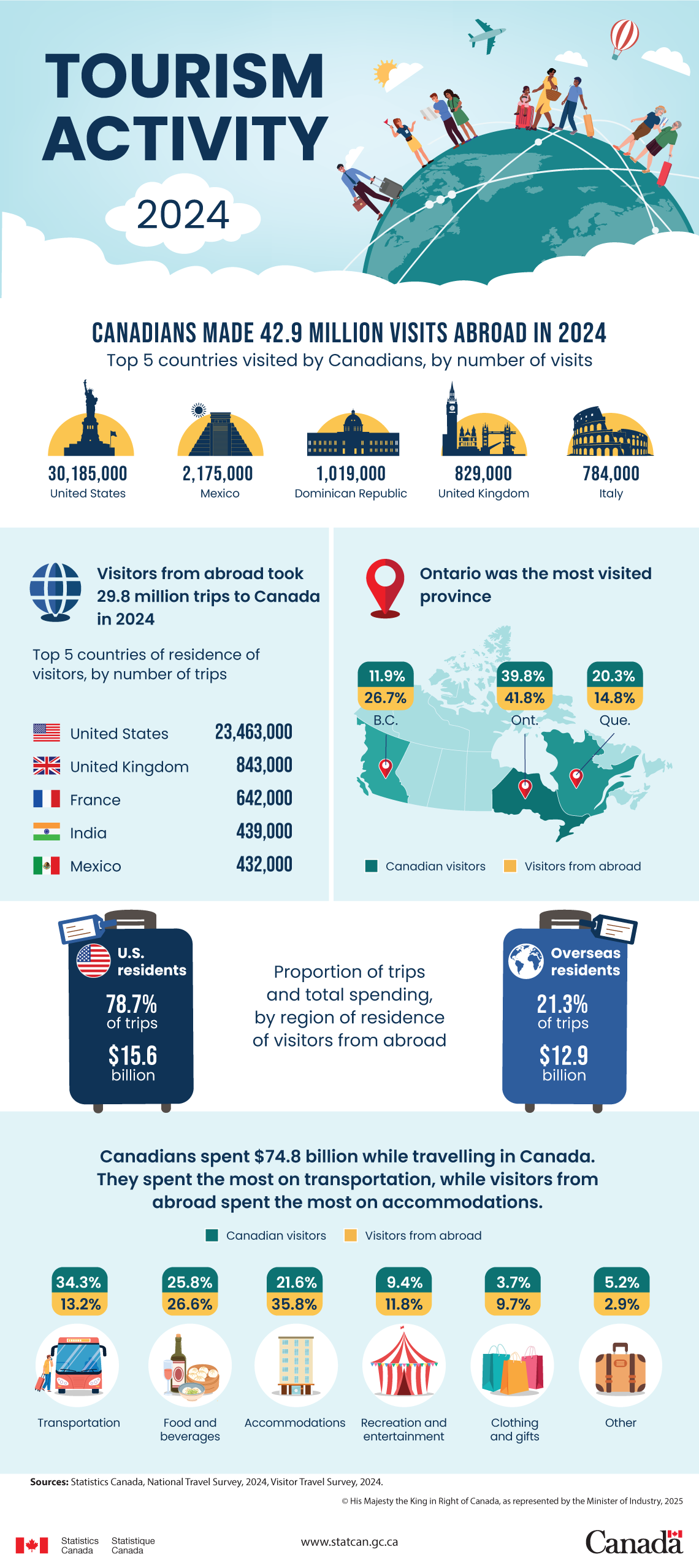

Canada ranks among the safest countries in the world for tourists by multiple indexes. According to the Travel and Tourism Competitiveness Index, that measure the attractiveness and potential of countries for investment and development in the travel and tourism sector, ranks Canada 11th out of 116 countries studied. The index also shows that Canada has a low standing when it comes to price competitiveness, coming in at 101 out of 116 countries looked at globally.

According to various sources tourism related industries contributed between $104.4 billion, to $129.7 billion to the Canadian economy. Resulting in GDP contributions of approximately $41.0 billion to $50.8 billion.

In 2024, total spending by visitors from the U. S. was $15.6 billion (78.7% of trips), while overseas visitors spent $12.9 billion (21.3% of trips). Canadians spent a total of $74.8 billion while travelling within Canada, with the highest spending on transportation (34.3%), followed by food and beverages (25.8%), accommodations (21.6%), recreation and entertainment (9.4%), clothing and gifts (3.7%), and other expenses (5.2%). Conversely, visitors from abroad spent most on accommodations (35.8%), food and beverages (26.6%), and transportation (13.2%).

Ontario was the most visited province in Canada, receiving 39.8% of Canadian visitors and 41.8% of visitors from abroad. Quebec followed with 20.3% of Canadian visitors and 14.8% of international visitors, while British Columbia received 11.9% of Canadian visitors and 26.7% of visitors from abroad.

Canadians made a total of 42.9 million visits abroad, with the top five countries visited being the United States (30.2 million visits), Mexico (2.2 million), the Dominican Republic (1.0 million), the United Kingdom (829,000), and Italy (784,000). Visitors from other countries made 29.8 million trips to Canada, primarily from the United States (23.5 million), followed by the United Kingdom (843,000), France (642,000), India (439,000), and Mexico (432,000).

In 2023, non-Canadian visitors made 27.2 million trips to Canada, with U.S. residents contributing the most, accounting for 21.2 million of those trips. The total spending by tourists reached $12.9 billion for U.S. residents and $12.6 billion for overseas visitors.

=== Historical data ===
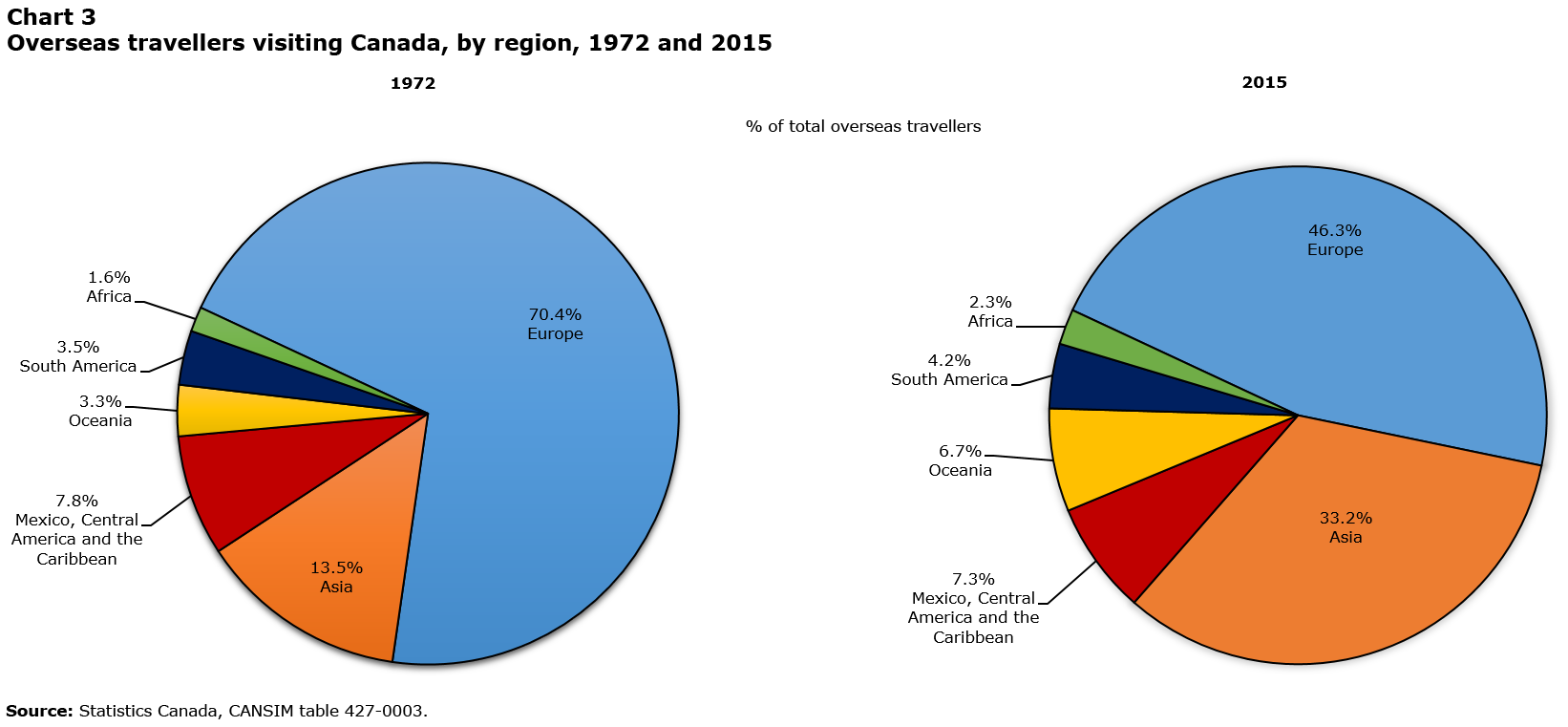

Historically, tourists to Canada were predominantly Americans, making up 98% of visitors in 1947. By 2015, this number dropped to 70%, reflecting a rise in overseas tourists. The number of overseas visitors grew faster than U. S. tourists over the decades. Between 1960 and 1970, there was a notable increase of over six times in overseas tourists, while American tourist numbers decreased during the 1970s.

In 1946, around 4 million tourists visited Canada, and this number grew to over 15 million by 1967, largely due to the rise in commercial air travel. The visitor count continued to increase until 2002 when it topped 20 million, before experiencing a decline largely caused by a drop in American tourists. Factors that contributed to this downturn included the SARS outbreak in 2003, the rise in the Canadian dollar, stricter ID laws introduced in 2009, and the global recession of 2008–2009. After these challenges, tourism numbers rebounded to nearly 18 million in 2015.

From 1960 to 1970, the number of overseas tourists increased more than sixfold. Conversely, American tourist numbers grew by only 55% during the 1960s and fell by 16% in the 1970s. The trend of increasing overseas tourists continued into the late 1990s, reaching 4 million for the first time during that decade.

The number of trips taken by Canadians abroad also increased significantly. From 1946 to 1960, trips to both the U. S. and overseas more than tripled. This growth continued, peaking at nearly 35 million trips by 2014. Travel trends for Canadians have often mirrored the value of the Canadian dollar; when the dollar depreciated in the 1990s, trips abroad declined, but this figure rose again after 2002 as the dollar appreciated.

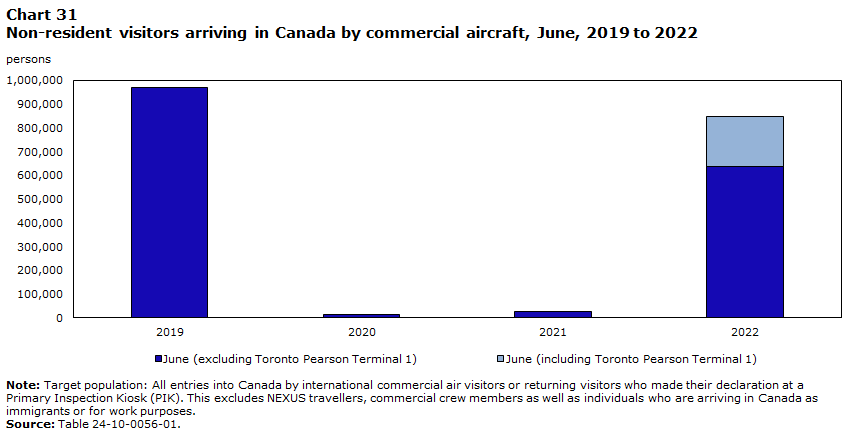

Canada welcomed 32 million visitors in 2019, with Toronto and Vancouver drawing the most attention. However, the COVID-19 epidemic had a significant influence on the tourism sector. April 2020 was the first complete month when countries around the world started to limit border access, which nearly halted international travel to and from Canada. The count of arrivals from countries other than the United States dropped by 96.6%, and those coming from the United States decreased by 96.8%. By June 2022, over two years later, and the number of international travellers arriving at Canadian airports was almost back to what it was before the pandemic hit. It was estimated that 846,700 non-resident visitors came in, which was a big jump from the 26,200 arrivals seen in June 2021. Canadians accounted for 85.8% of all tourism spending in early 2022, including 315,400 foreign visitors to Canada in May 2022. Almost ten times as many American tourists visited Canada in May compared to the year before, and similar increases were seen from other countries. In May 2019, 73.6% of all air travel comprised 593,200 Canadians who travelled to the United States.

== Government initiatives ==
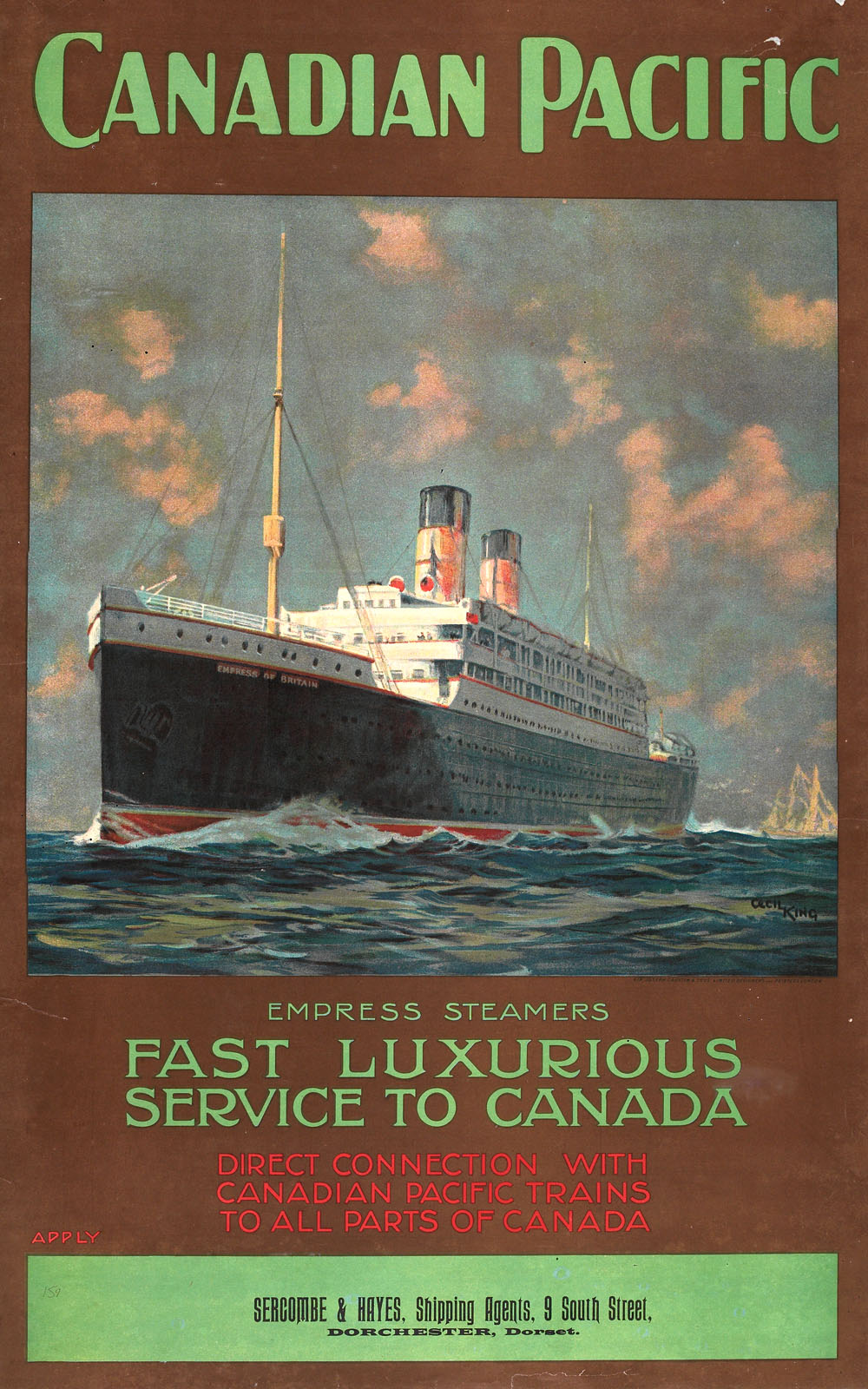
Canadian Pacific poster advertising travel from the UK to Canada by ship, 1920

The Canadian government and private businesses have a long tradition of promoting tourism from abroad. Destination Canada was created in 1995 and reports to the Minister of Small Business and Tourism and the Minister of Innovation, Science and Economic Development. It sponsors marketing campaigns domestically and in Australia, China, France, Germany, Japan, Mexico, South Korea, United Kingdom and the United States.

In 2023 the federal government allocated $108 million over three years to support tourism initiatives across the country. This financing is intended to help small businesses, non-profits, and both Indigenous and non-Indigenous communities improve their tourism products. The distribution of funds are directed to "provincial and regional tourism associations, government agencies, hoteliers, tour operators, airlines and attractions managers".

Provincial and municipal governments also have programs to assist in the promotion of tourism, such as "The Experience Ontario program", which helps coordinate community events and offers financial support to festival organizers, non-profits, and municipalities for impactful celebrations, such as Canada Day. Small grants are also available through various provincial and municipal initiatives to support environmental and sustainability projects related to ecotourism.

== Ecotourism ==
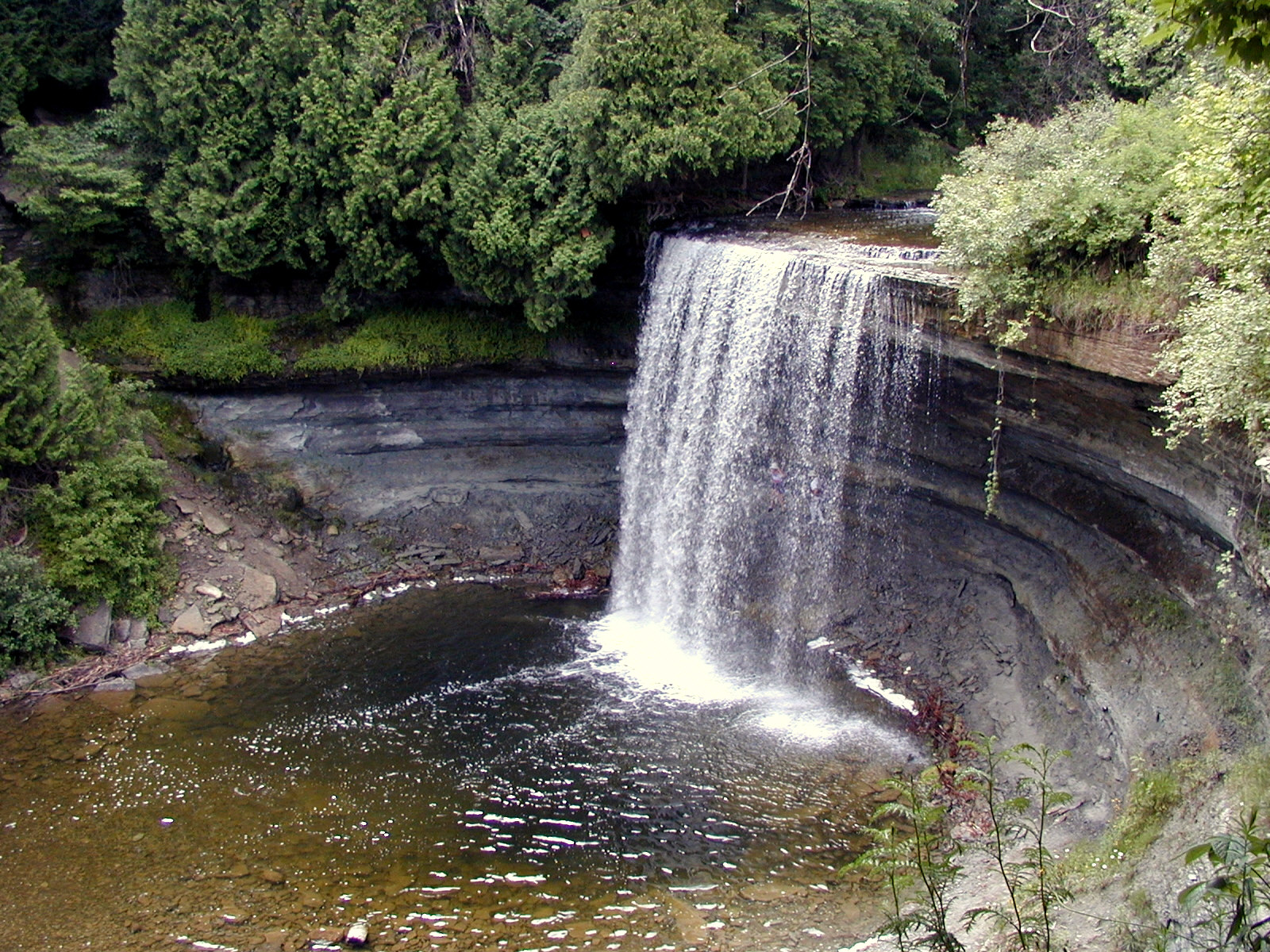
Bridal Veil Falls on Lake Huron's Manitoulin Island, Ontario

Ecotourism, which emphasizes low-impact appreciation of nature, is gaining traction, with 82% of Canadians showing interest in it. A survey by Deloitte - Future of Canada centre found that 54% of Canadians are interested in Indigenous experiences, such as cultural workshops and traditional accommodations. Canada made up 2.2% of the world's ecotourism market in 2023. The ecotourism industry in Canada brought in a total of US$5,296.3 million in 2023.

Organizations like Parks Canada and the Indigenous Tourism Association of Canada (ITAC) support local communities to bolster tourism. Destination Canada joined the Global Sustainable Tourism Council (GSTC) in late 2023. Ecotourism hotspots include Grasslands National Park in Saskatchewan, Manitoulin Island in Ontario, the Bay of Fundy in New Brunswick, Torngat Mountains National Park in Newfoundland and Labrador for Inuit culture, and Wanuskewin in Saskatchewan for Plains Cree culture and bison restoration efforts.

=== National parks ===
In Canada, national parks are maintained by Parks Canada, a government agency. The areas that fall within Parks Canada's governance include a wide range of protected areas, encompassing National Historic Sites, National Marine Conservation Areas (NMCA), and National Park Reserves. Canada established its first national park in Banff in 1885, and has since expanded its national park system to include 37 national parks and 11 national park reserves.

=== Provincial parks ===
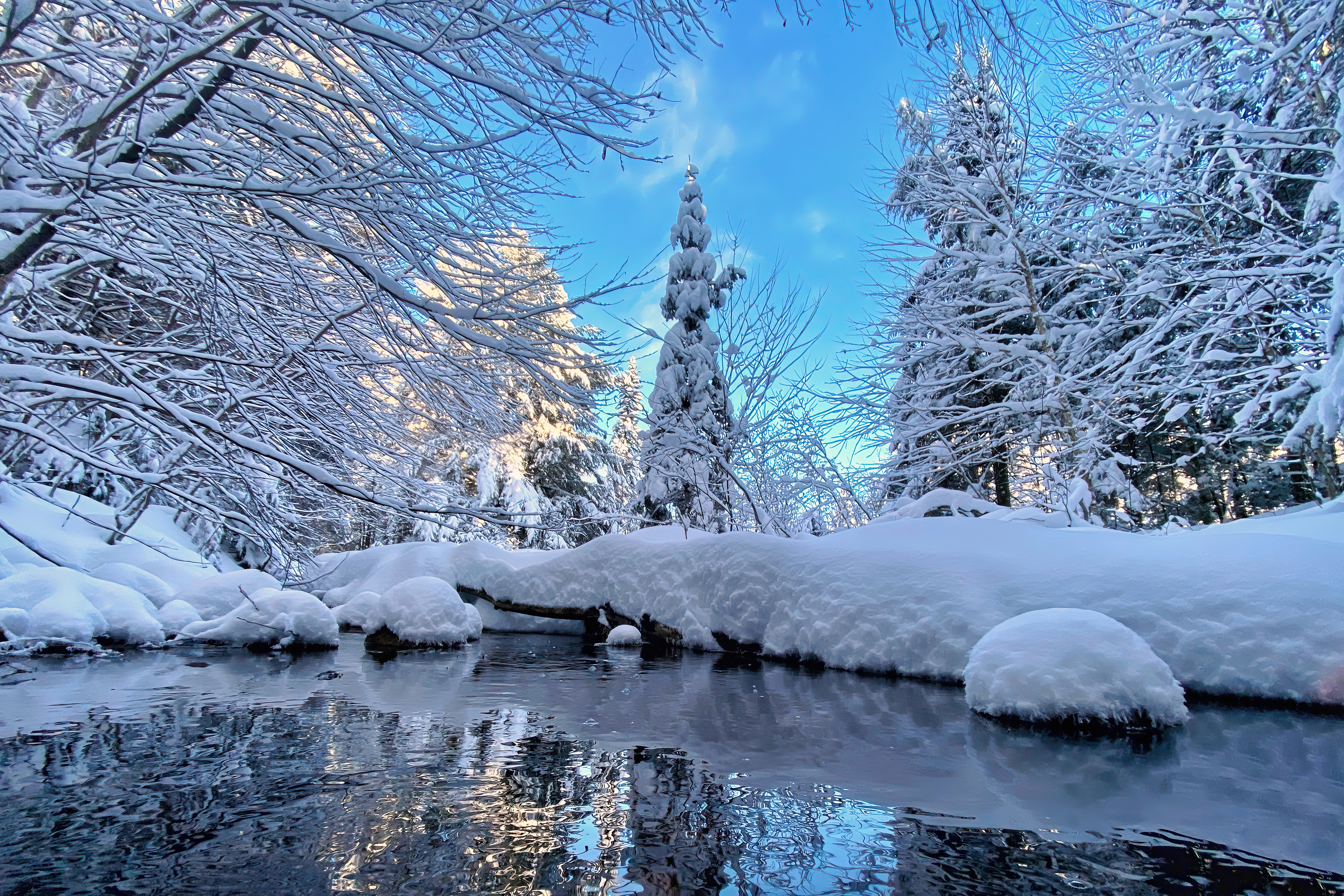
Winter scene in Algonquin Park

Protected areas of Canada consist of approximately 12.1 percent of the nation's landmass and freshwater are considered conservation areas, including 11.4 percent designated as protected areas. Approximately 13.8 percent of Canada's territorial waters are conserved, including 8.9 percent designated as protected areas. Terrestrial areas conserved have increased by 65 percent in the 21st century, while marine areas conserved have increased by more than 3,800 percent.

Conservation and protected areas have different mandates depending on the organization which manages them, with some areas having a greater focus on ecological integrity, historical preservation, public usage, scientific research, or a combination of usages. Some areas such as the Polar Bear Pass, are co-managed and overseen by government and local indigenous agencies.

=== World Heritage Sites ===
Nahanni National Park in the Dehcho Region of the Northwest Territories

The United Nations Educational, Scientific and Cultural Organization (UNESCO) World Heritage Sites are places of importance to cultural or natural heritage as described in the UNESCO World Heritage Convention, established in 1972. Cultural heritage consists of monuments (such as architectural works, monumental sculptures, or inscriptions), groups of buildings, and sites (including archaeological sites). Natural heritage consists of natural features (physical and biological formations), geological and physiographical formations (including habitats of threatened species of animals and plants), and natural sites which are important from the point of view of science, conservation, or natural beauty. Canada accepted the convention on 23 July 1976. There are 22 World Heritage Sites in Canada, with a further 10 on the tentative list.

The first two sites in Canada added to the list were L'Anse aux Meadows and Nahanni National Park Reserve, both at the Second Session of the World Heritage Committee, held in Washington, D.C., in 1978. The most recent sites listed were Tr’ondëk-Klondike and Anticosti, both in 2023. Two sites are shared with the United States. Ten sites are listed for their cultural significance, eleven for natural significance, and one, Pimachiowin Aki, is listed for both. Canada has served as a member of the World Heritage Committee four times: 1976–1978, 1985–1991, 1995–2001, and 2005–2009.

=== National Historic Sites ===
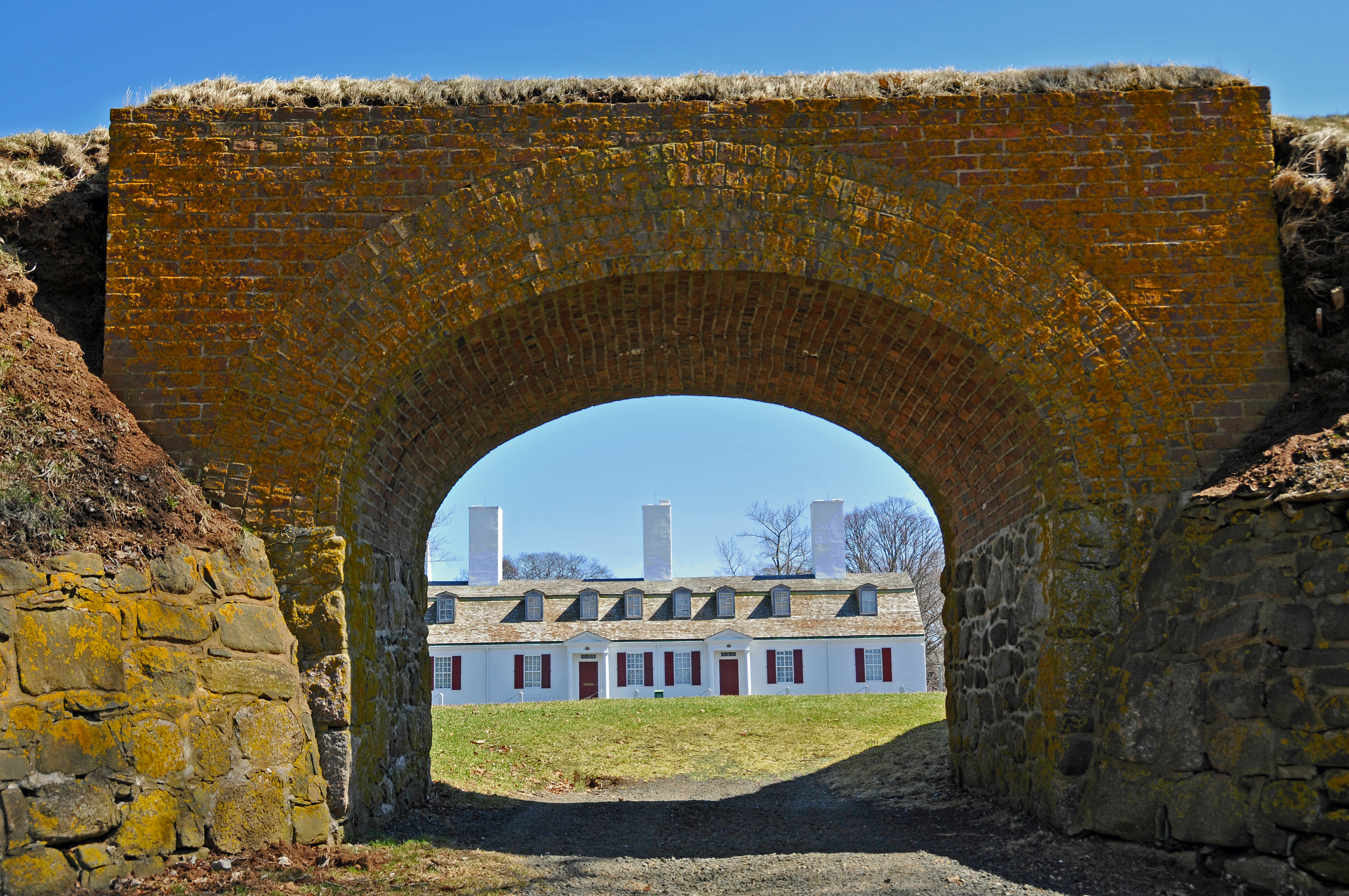
Fort Anne in Annapolis Royal, Nova Scotia, dates from 1629 and became Canada's first National Historic Site in 1917

National Historic Sites of Canada (French: Lieux historiques nationaux du Canada) are places that have been designated by the federal Minister of the Environment on the advice of the Historic Sites and Monuments Board of Canada (HSMBC), as being of national historic significance. Parks Canada, a federal agency, manages the National Historic Sites program. Fort Anne, in Annapolis Royal, Nova Scotia, became Canada’s first administered National Historic Site in 1917. As of March 2026, there were 1,004 National Historic Sites, 171 of which are administered by Parks Canada; the remainder are administered or owned by other levels of government or private entities. The sites are located across all ten provinces and three territories, with two sites located in France (the Beaumont-Hamel Newfoundland Memorial and Canadian National Vimy Memorial).

There are related federal designations for National Historic Events and National Historic Persons. Sites, Events and Persons are each typically marked by a federal plaque of the same style, but the markers do not indicate which designation a subject has been given. For example, the Rideau Canal is a National Historic Site, while the Welland Canal is a National Historic Event.

== Festivals, sporting events and amusement parks ==
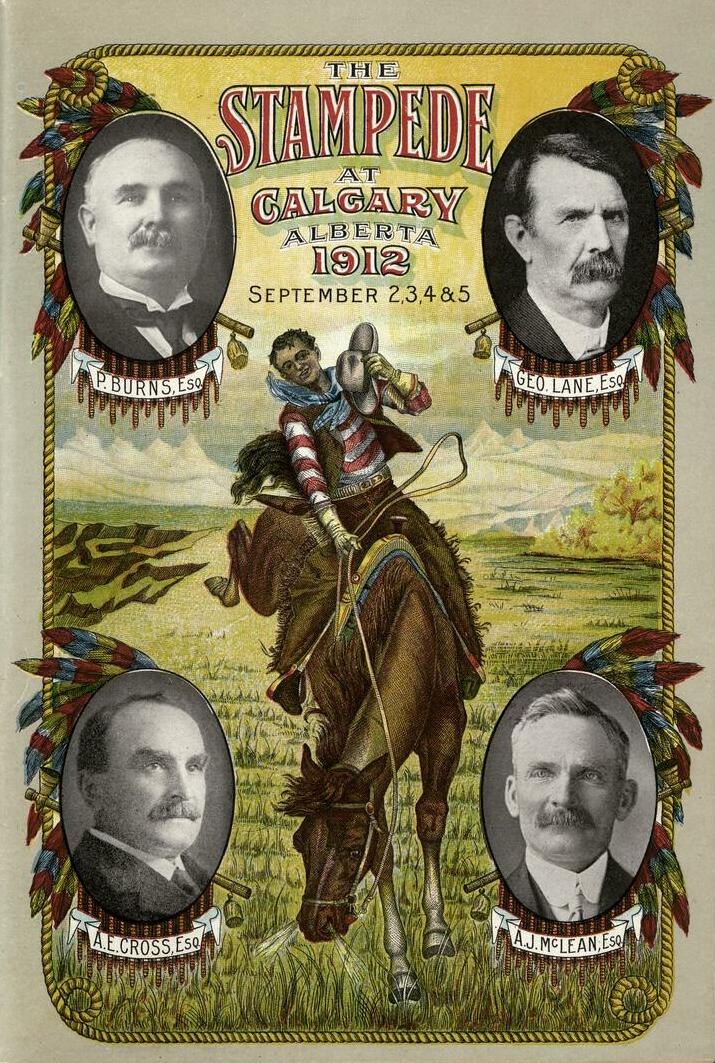
The Program for the 1912 Calgary Stampede (part of the collection of the Glenbow Archives).

Canada has a long tradition of hosting festivals and events throughout the year. The industry adds over $33 billion to the country's economy and provides jobs for more than 229,000 people in areas like business events, trade fairs, festivals, and meetings. Popular festivals include the summer's Montreal Jazz Festival and Calgary Stampede, Winterlude in Ottawa-Gatineau during the winter, and nationwide celebrations for Canada Day. Other notable festivals include the Toronto International Film Festival (TIFF), Vancouver Pride Parade and Just For Laughs comedy festival. The Canadian National Exhibition is an annual fair that takes place at Exhibition Place in Toronto with approximately 1.6 million visitors each year, it's Canada's largest annual community event and one of the top fairs in North America.

Canada hosts numerous top level sporting events, from annual professional championships like the Grey Cup (CFL), and occasionally hosting the World Series (MLB), NBA playoffs and Stanley Cup Playoffs (NHL) to international multi-sport games such as the Canada Games, the Commonwealth Games, Olympic Games, and the FIFA World Cup. Other notable events include those in motorsports (Formula 1 Canadian Grand Prix), golf (National Bank Open), tennis (National Bank Open), and curling (The Brier). The spectator sports industry generated an operating revenue of approximately $4.4 billion in 2023.

Canada is also home to multiple large amusement parks such as Canada's Wonderland in Ontario, Canada's largest amusement park with approximately 3.8 million visitors annually. La Ronde in Quebec is the country's second largest amusement park originally built as the entertainment complex for Expo 67, the 1967 world's fair. Calaway Park is western Canada's largest amusement park with approximately 160 acres (65 ha) of land. Galaxyland in the West Edmonton Mall in Alberta is an indoor amusement centre, alongside World Waterpark, attracts visitors all year round. Businesses in the amusement and recreation subsector reported earnings of approximately $15.6 billion in 2023.

== Museums and art galleries ==
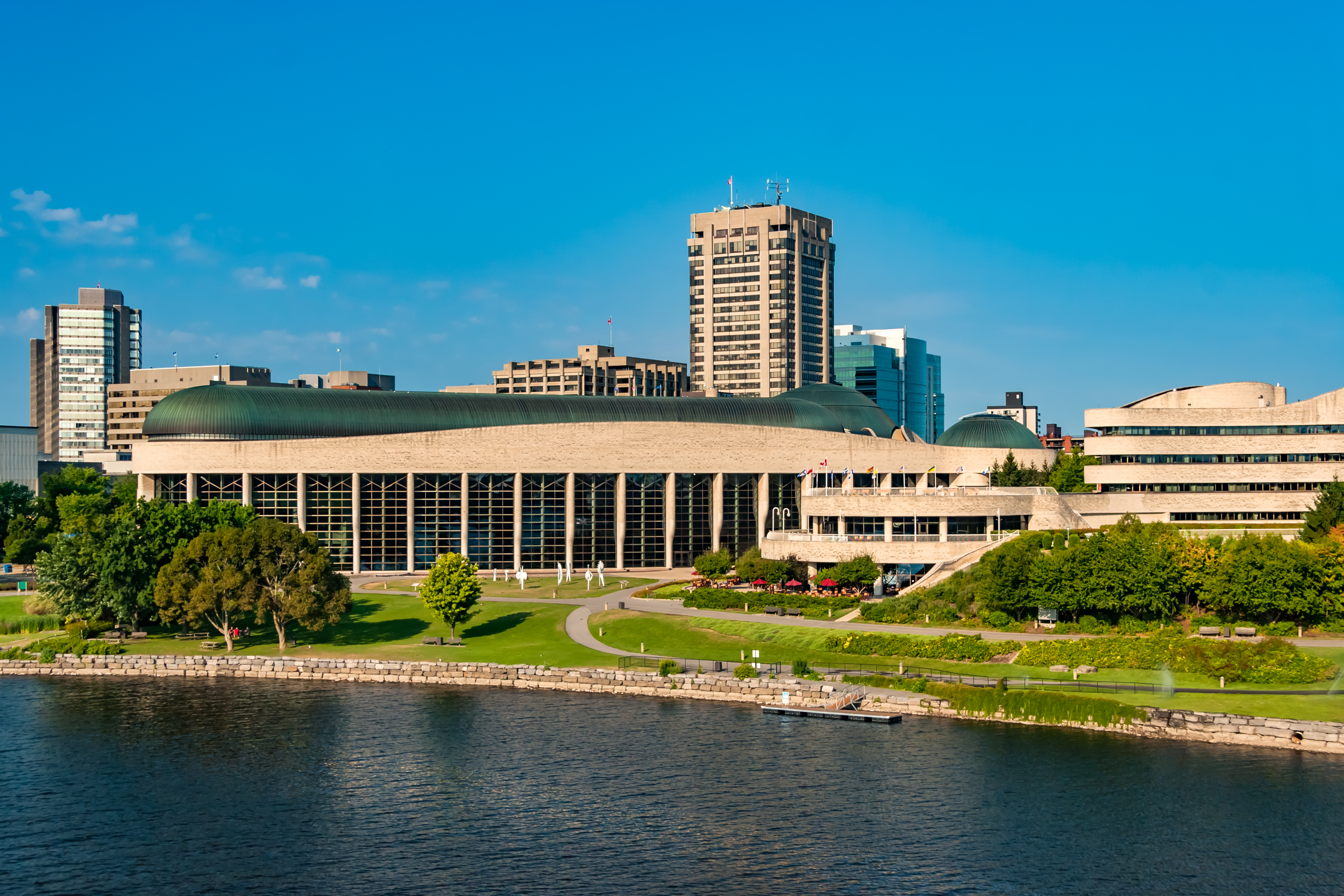
The Canadian Museum of History is a national museum on anthropology, Canadian history, cultural studies, and ethnology in Gatineau, Quebec

There are nine national museums in Canada, including seven located in the National Capital Region, one in Western Canada, and another in Atlantic Canada. Four of these museums are independent Crown corporations reporting to the Canadian Heritage Minister. The national museums include: the Canada Agriculture and Food Museum, Canada Aviation and Space Museum, Canada Science and Technology Museum, Canadian Museum of History, Canadian War Museum, Canadian Museum for Human Rights, Canadian Museum of Immigration at Pier 21, Canadian Museum of Nature, and the National Gallery of Canada.

Provincial and territorial museums are similar to national museums and are operated by provincial and territorial governments. In Quebec, the term "national" is used for provincial museums. The Manitoba Museum in Winnipeg covers both human and natural history and had over 303,000 visitors in 2017. The Royal Ontario museum in Toronto is Canada's largest museum, attracting 1.4 million visitors in 2017 and features art, human history, and natural history. The Ontario Science Centre in Toronto is an interactive science museum that saw nearly 900,000 visitors in 2019. Notable galleries include the Art Gallery of Ontario, recognized for its extensive collection of Canadian art, and the Musée national des beaux-arts du Québec, which holds around 40,000 works created in or by Quebec artists since the 18th century. Some galleries, like The Rooms in Newfoundland and Labrador, serve multiple functions.

== Provinces and territories ==
=== Alberta ===
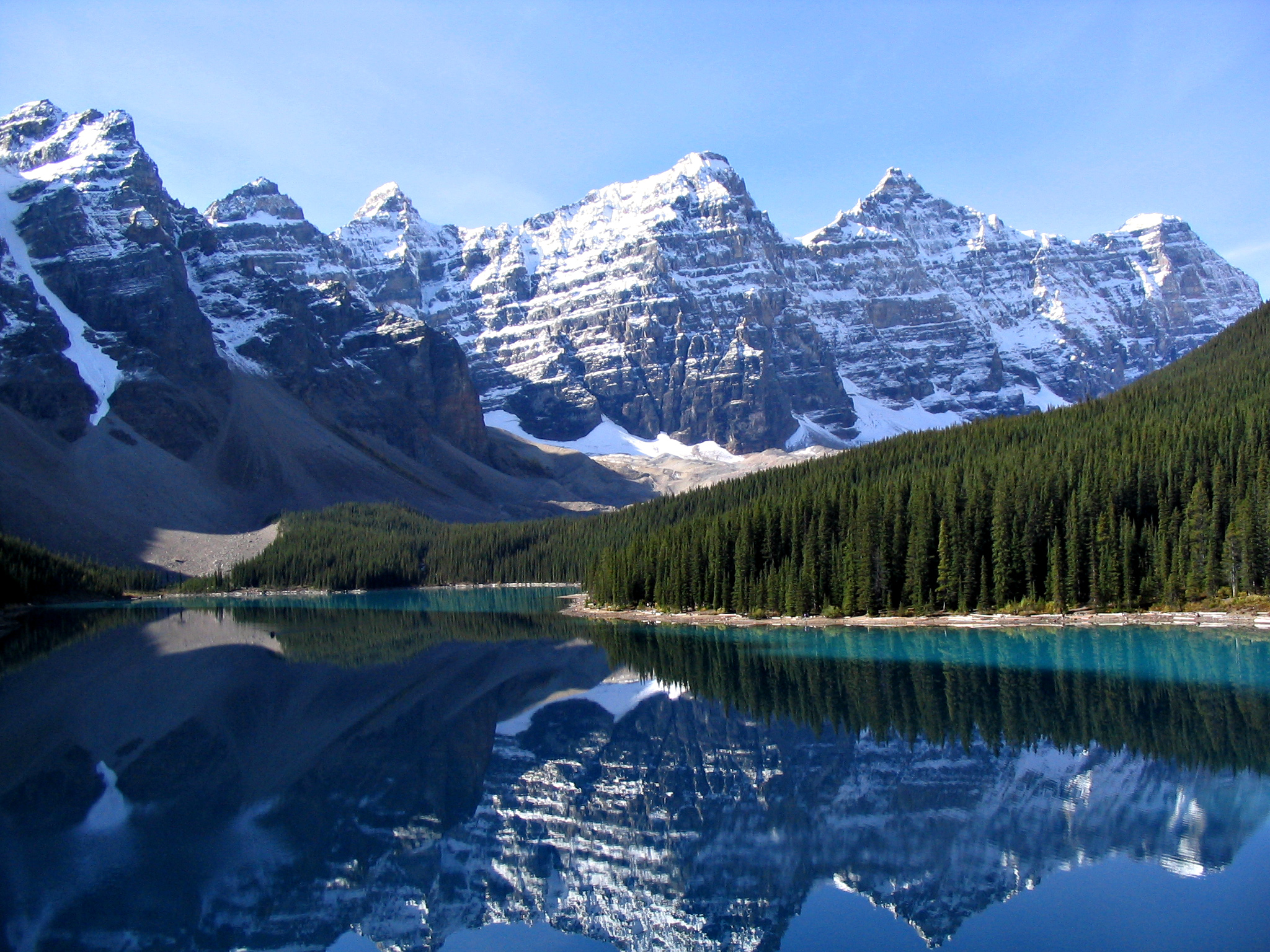
Moraine Lake, and the Valley of the Ten Peaks

Tourism in Alberta saw 38.1 million visits that generated $14.4 billion in revenue, and supporting around 260,000 jobs in 2024. The province hosts approximately 27,900 tourism-related businesses. The number of domestic visits to the Alberta Rockies was approximately 5.5 million in 2024. This was the third-highest number of visits to the region on record and 3.8% below the all-time high set in 2021 (5.7 million visits).

The province has six UNESCO World Heritage Sites, five national parks, and numerous provincial parks. Natural landscapes like the Banff National Park and Jasper National Park, along with urban attractions such as West Edmonton Mall and the Calgary Stampede are some of the primary attractions. The province has a long-term strategy to grow tourism to $25 billion in visitor spending by 2035, supporting attractions like the Dinosaur Provincial Park and the Royal Tyrrell Museum.

=== British Columbia ===
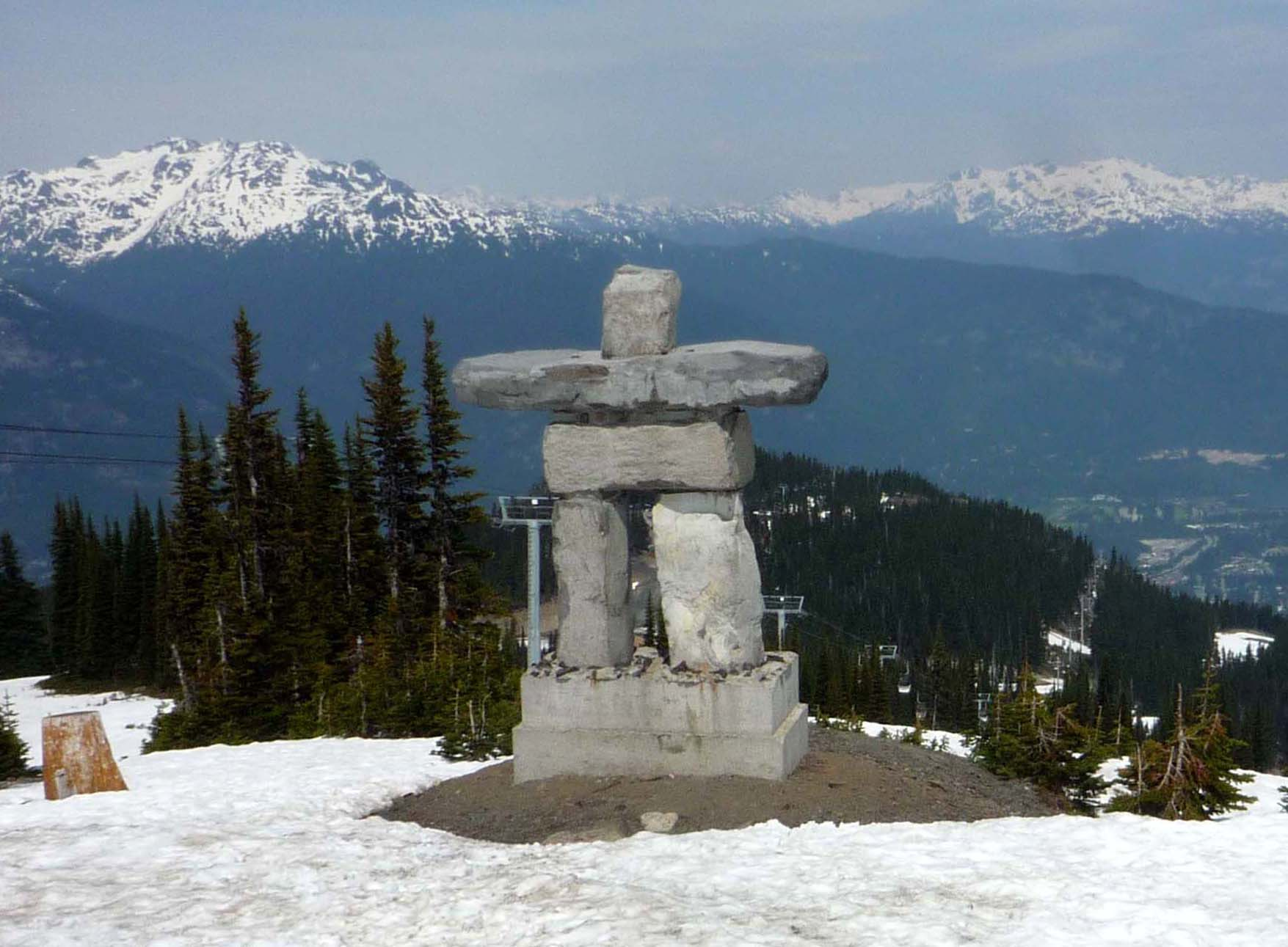
A statue of Ilanaaq, logo of the 2010 Olympics, located at the top of the Whistler Village Gondola on Whistler Mountain

British Columbia is one of the most-visited parts of Canada, with tourism ranking as the province's second-largest industry. British Columbia's tourism reached approximately $22.1 billion in revenue in 2023, supporting over 125,000 jobs with $5.9B in wages. The province is home to vast mountains, large forests, and a diverse coastline. The Rocky Mountains in the interior attract skiers in the winter and bikers and hikers in the summer. The Pacific coastline attracts tourists with its beaches and for kayaking and whale watching, particularly around places like Vancouver Island.

Vancouver, the largest city in British Columbia, is an urban centre that offers a mix of culture, history, and entertainment. Tourists are attracted to Stanley Park, Granville Island, and the Capilano Suspension Bridge. Events like the Vancouver International Film Festival and the Vancouver Folk Music Festival attract tourist from around the world and domestically.

=== Manitoba ===
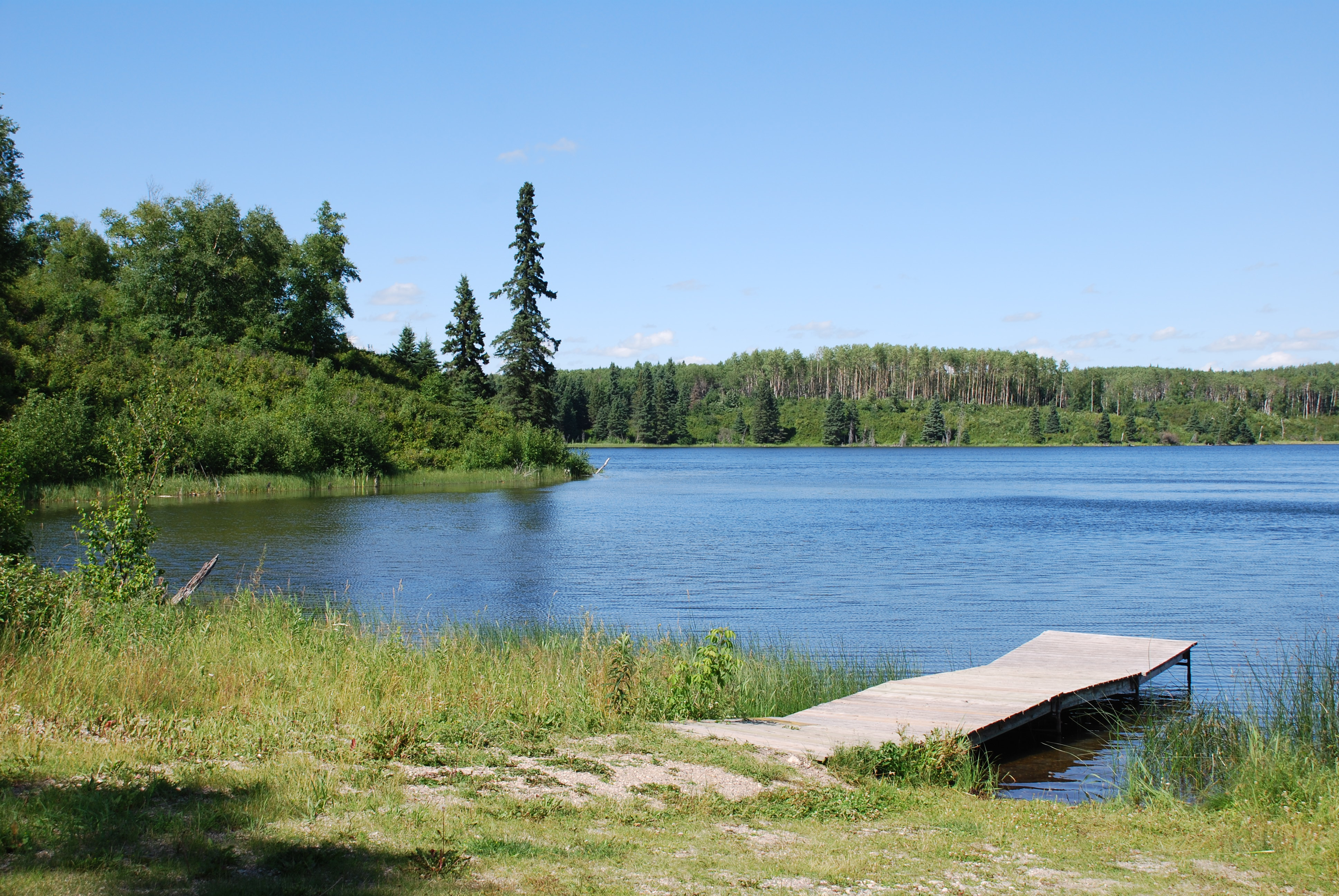
Deep Lake at Riding Mountain National Park

Manitoba, a province located in central Canada, welcomed over 10.6 million visitors spending approximately $1.89 billion in 2024. The province national parks like Riding Mountain National Park and Wapusk National Park, attract ecotourist for hiking, wildlife viewing, and camping. Assiniboine River attracts tourists for its water activities such as boating and fishing.

Winnipeg, the provincial capital, is home to numerous museums and cultural institutions, such as the Canadian Museum for Human Rights and the Manitoba Museum. Events like Folklorama and Festival du Voyageur. Both provincial government a municipal governments have invested in infrastructure, including hotels, transportation, and tourism promotion, making the province more accessible to travellers.

=== New Brunswick ===
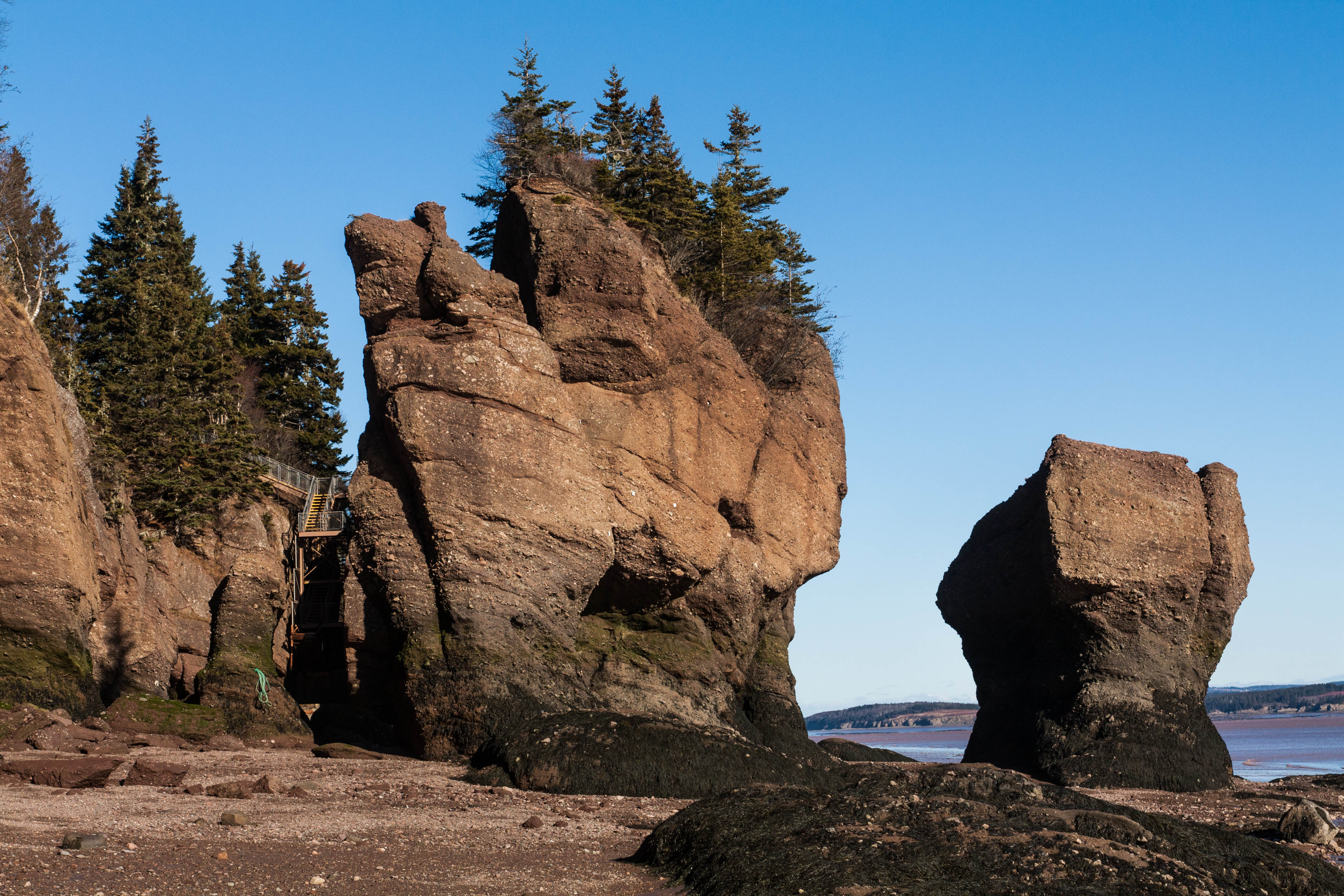
Tilted layers of sandstone at Hopewell Rocks in the Bay of Fundy

In 2024, tourism in New Brunswick generated $2.5 billion in visitor spending, attracted by natural features such as the Bay of Fundy, known for its tides. Sites such as Hopewell Rocks, Fundy National Park, and the old Roosevelt Campobello International Park are popular destinations

The city of Saint John historic Loyalist areas feature colonial architecture of the first English settlers. Attractions include the New Brunswick Museum and Saint John Jewish Historical Museum. Fredericton, the capital city, hosts various cultural festivals such as the Harvest Jazz and Blues Festival, celebrating local music and food, which draws many visitors each year.

=== Newfoundland and Labrador ===
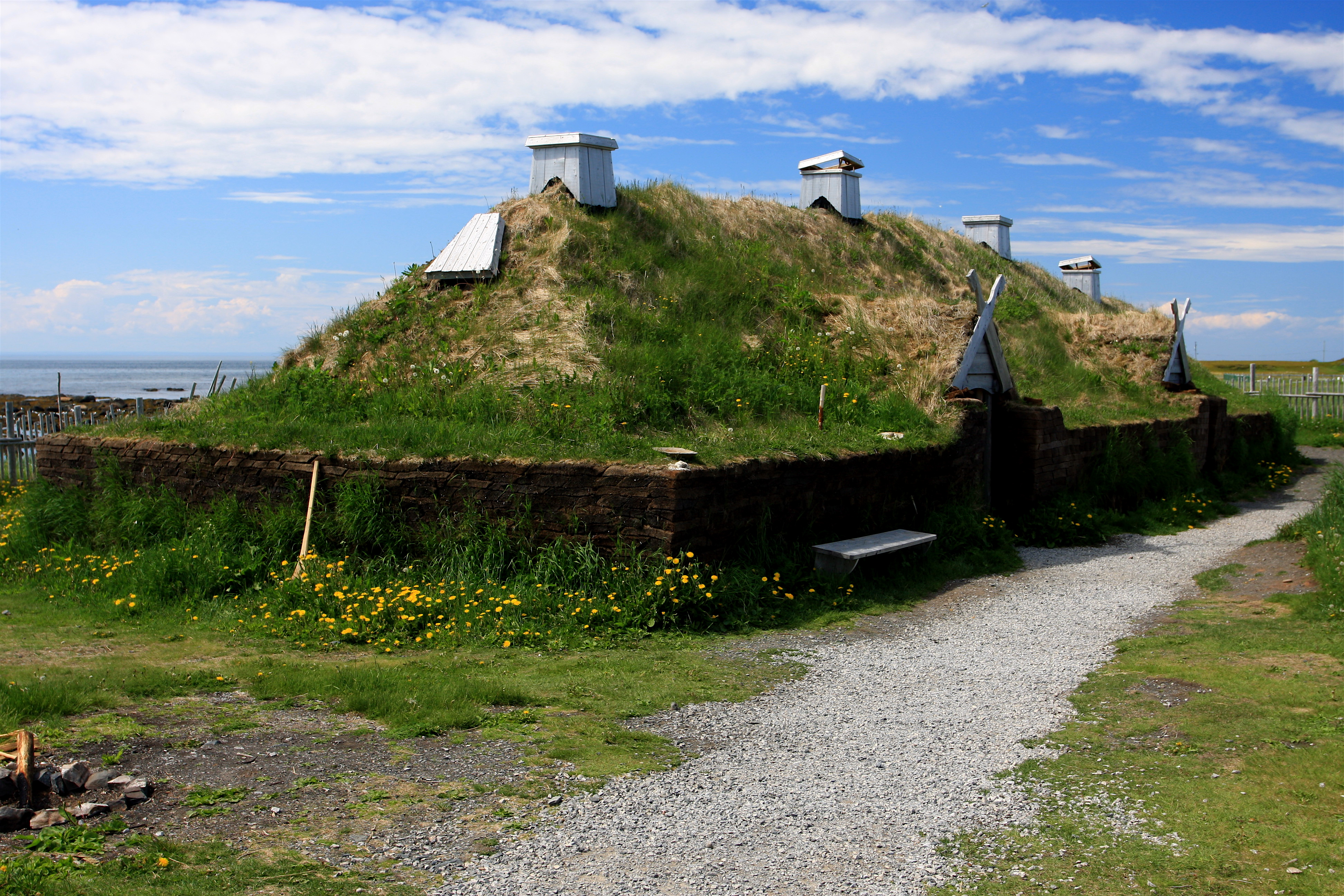
Replica of 'Hall A' at L'Anse aux Meadows a National Historic Site of Canada since 1978

Newfoundland and Labrador tourism contributed over $1.14 billion to the economy in 2023. Natural wonders like Gros Morne National Park (fjords, Tablelands), lighthouses at Cape Spear and Signal Hill alongside the Viking archaeological site at L'Anse aux Meadows and puffins, whale and iceberg viewing attract a wide array of visitors.

The province's capital, St. John's, is the oldest city in North America, founded in 1497 by John Cabot. It contains many historical locations, such as Cabot Tower, receiver of the first wireless trans-Atlantic message in 1901. St. John's has become a popular stop for cruise ships originating from ports in Canada, the United States and Europe. The cruise industry has brought tens of thousands of tourists to the St. John's area. In the city's downtown core, George Street, renowned for its nightlife, is home to the most bars and pubs per square foot in North America.

=== Northwest Territories ===
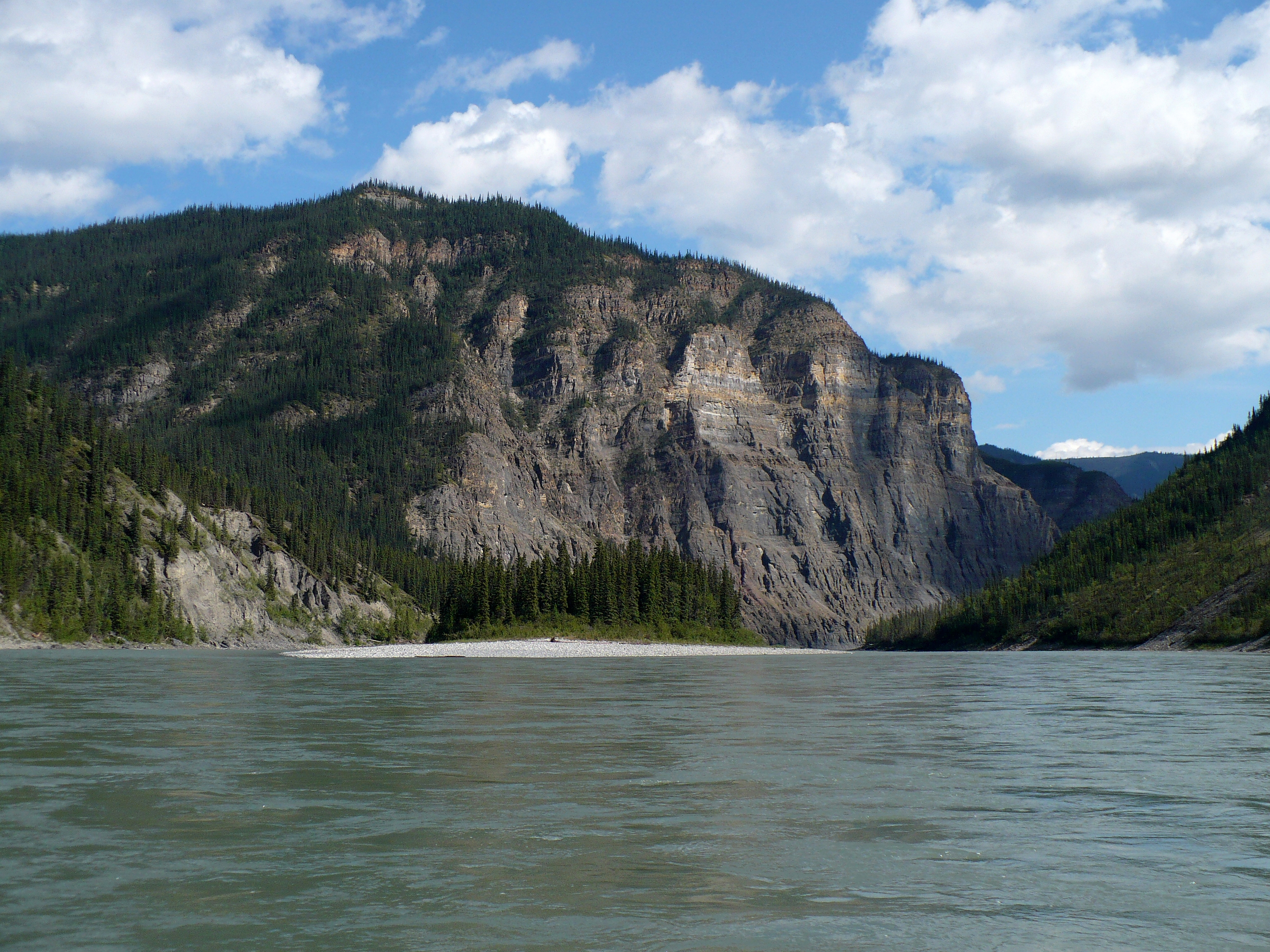
Nahanni National Park Reserve, one of several national parks and reserves in the Northwest Territories

The Northwest Territories has one of the lowest population densities in Canada, but still saw approximately 120,000 visitors spending more than $210 million in 2022. Its tourism is centred around activities like seeing the Northern Lights, hiking in national parks, and exploring pristine lakes and rivers. Key attractions include Great Slave Lake, Nahanni National Park Reserve, Wood Buffalo National Park, and cities like Yellowknife which provide urban amenities.

The Indigenous culture tourism with guided tours to archaeological sites, traditional fishing, and dog sledding has become popular. Festivals like the National Indigenous Peoples Day exhibit music, storytelling, and dance, Sacred sites like Nááts'ihch'oh, Nahanni National Park Reserve, and Thaidene Nëné National Park Reserve. are open to the public.

=== Nova Scotia ===
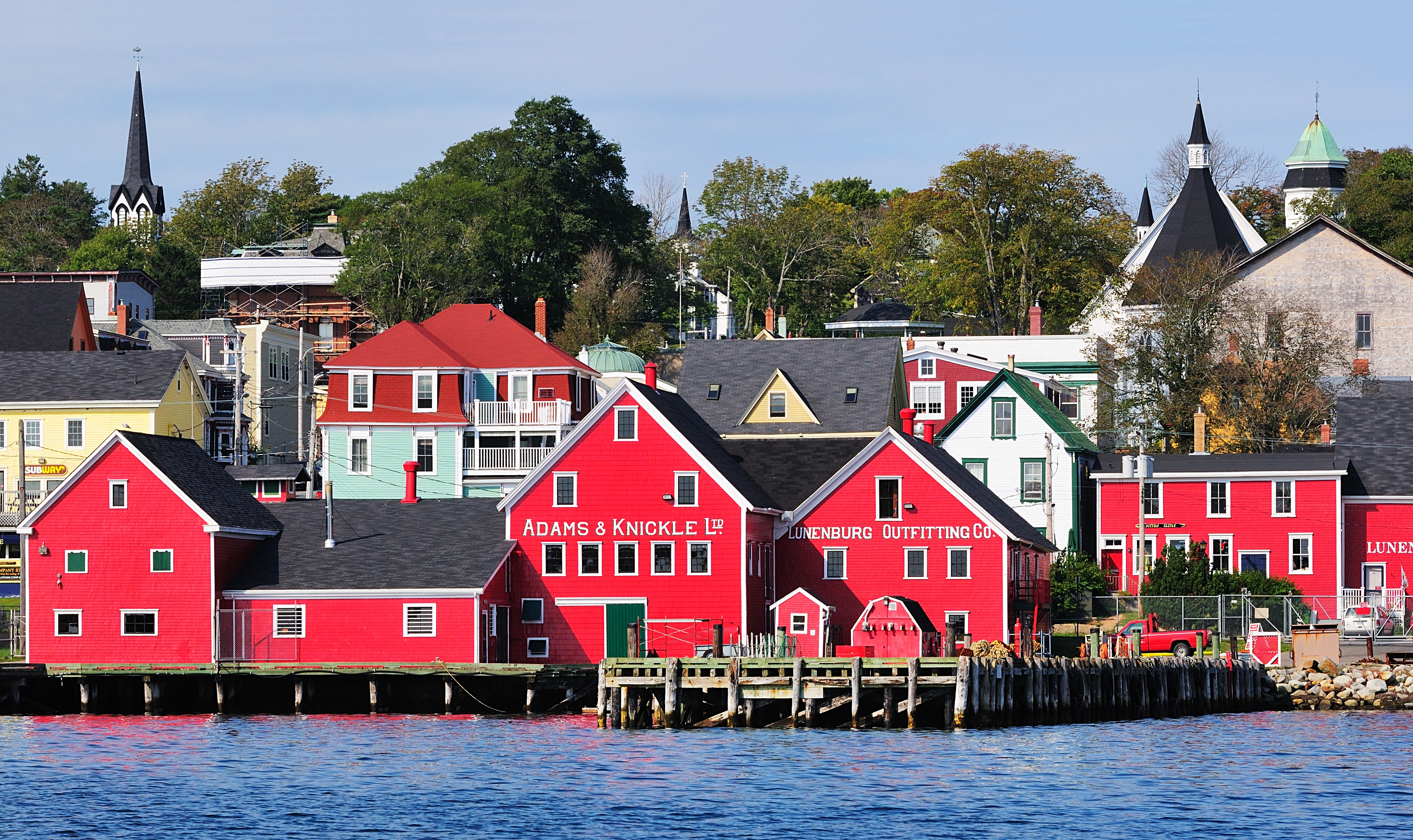
The historic district of Lunenburg, is a National Historic Site of Canada and a UNESCO World Heritage Site

Nova Scotia received over 2 million visitors, generating approximately $3.5 billion in revenue in 2024. The province has two major national parks, Cape Breton Highlands National Park and Kejimkujik National Park. Nova Scotia is also home to three UNESCO World Heritage Sites. The two cultural and one natural site are the town of Lunenburg, the Grand-Pré National Historic Site, and the Joggins fossil cliffs. Nova Scotia is also famous for its numerous historical sites, museums, and natural areas. Notable among these is Fort Anne in Annapolis Royal, Canada's first National Historic Site. For the year 2024, visitation to Nova Scotia saw just over 2 million non-resident visitors. Peggy's Cove is regarded as among the most photographed sites in Canada, known for the distinctive Peggys Point Lighthouse.

Halifax, the provincial capital, has several major attractions, such as the Pier 21 museum, Citadel Hill, and the Public Gardens. The Halifax Metro Centre is home to numerous events both sport-related and otherwise, such as the Nova Scotia International Tattoo. Downtown Halifax is considered the prime tourism district in Halifax, with most historic attractions located here as well as the waterfront harbourwalk, a continuous 3 km (2 mi) stretch of boardwalk home to street vendors, entertainers, the Casino Nova Scotia, and the Maritime Museum of the Atlantic. Downtown Halifax is also the location of several major hotels, the Art Gallery of Nova Scotia and historic buildings such as Province House, the provincial legislative building; and Government House, the official residence of the Lieutenant Governor.

=== Nunavut Territory ===
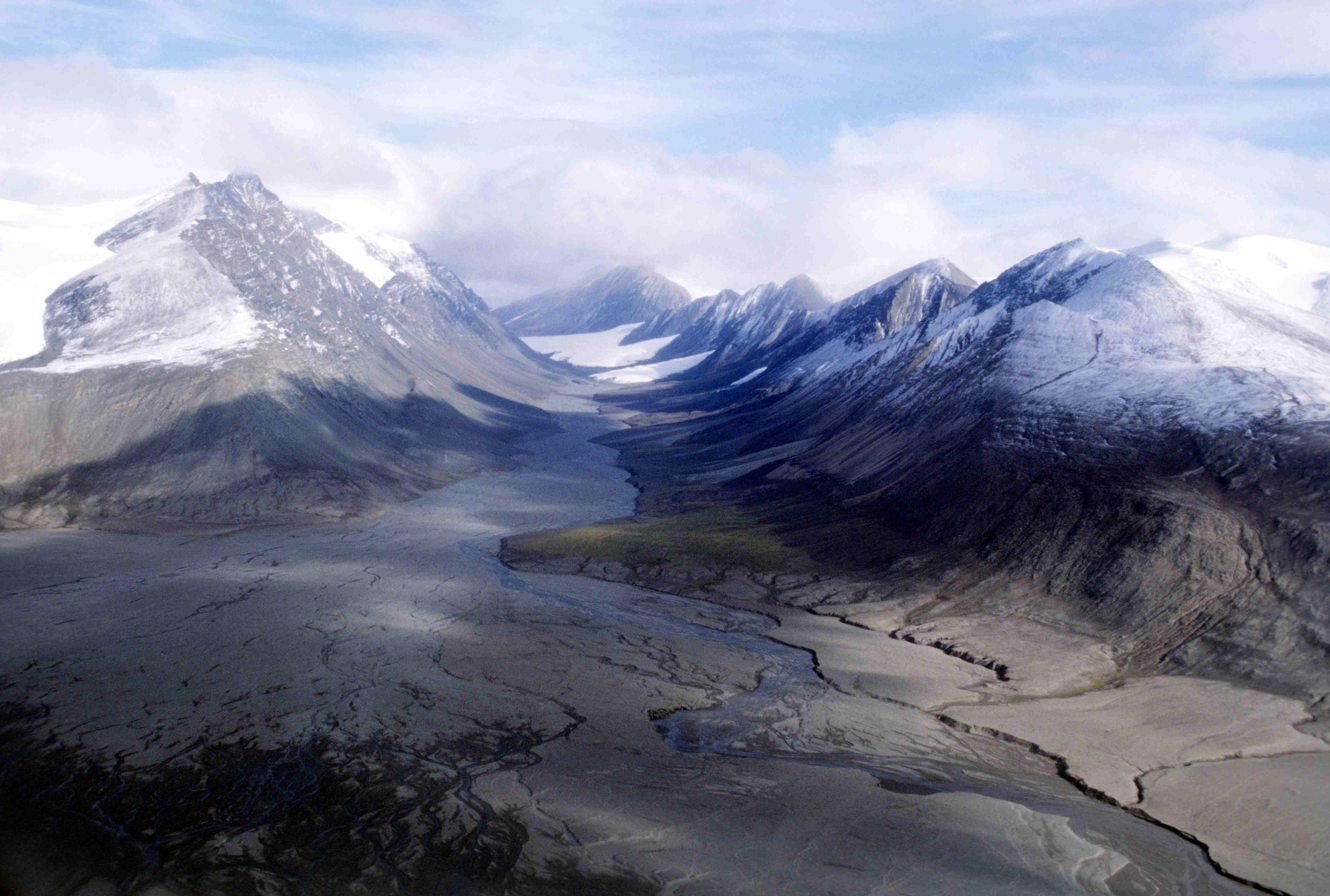
Aerial view of Quttinirpaaq National Park

It is estimated that Nunavut sees about 50,000 visitors each year, with around 8,000 being international travellers, mostly arriving on cruise ships. The number of cruise ship visits doubled in 2023, bringing over 5,200 passengers to 14 communities. The tourism sector currently employs about 3,000 workers.

Nunavut tourism centres feature activities including wildlife viewing (polar bears, whales, muskox), hiking, and experiencing local traditions like igloo building. Top tourism destinations include Auyuittuq National Park for hiking, Quttinirpaaq National Park for its northernmost status, and the capital city of Iqaluit for cultural events like the Toonik Tyme festival. Other destinations like Cape Dorset are known for Inuit art, while Kugluktuk for wildlife viewing.

=== Ontario ===
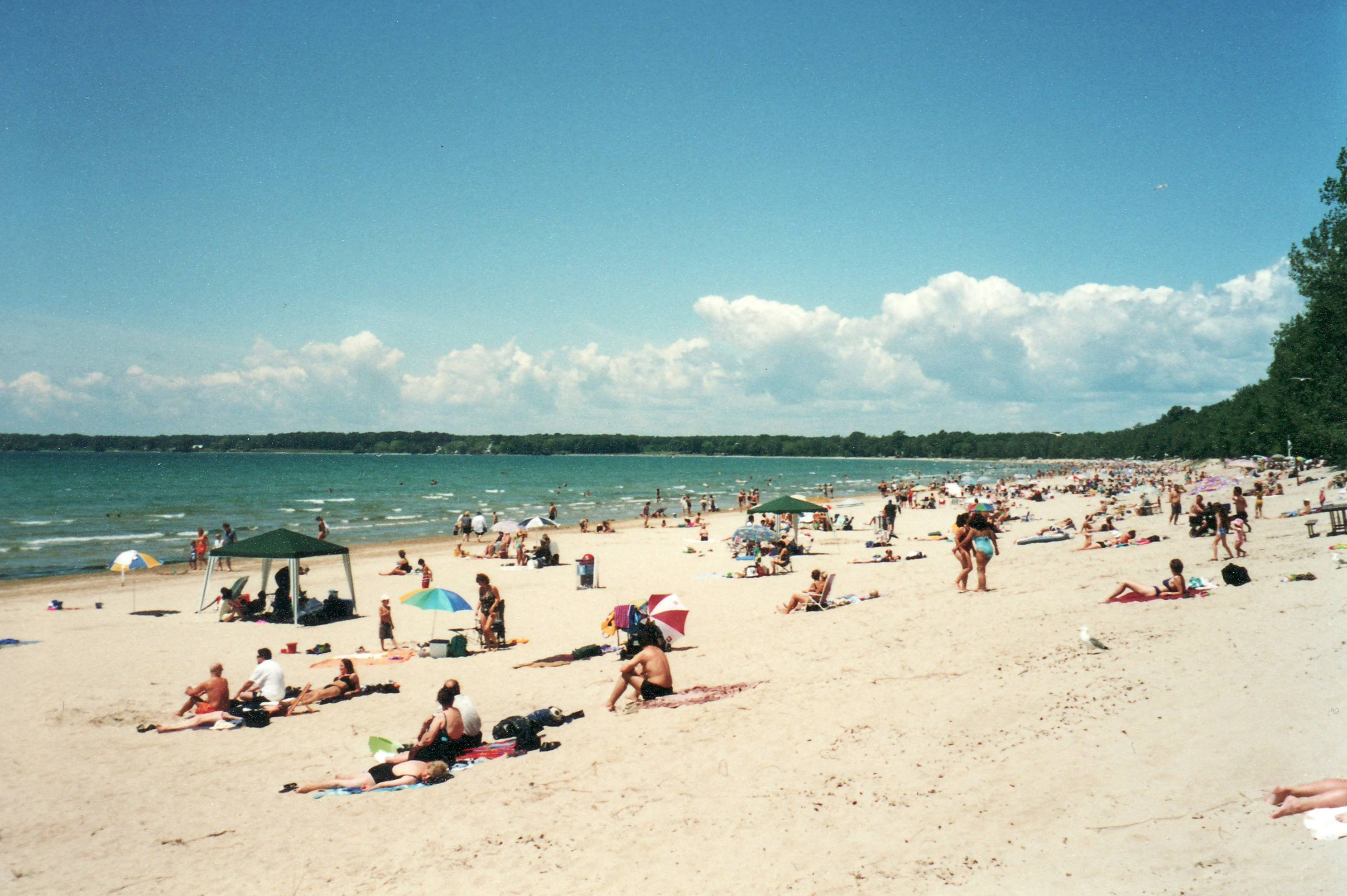
Lake Ontario - Sandbanks Provincial Park

Ontario is Canada's largest province by population and the second largest by area, Ontario is a top travel destination in Canada, attracting millions of tourists each year, with over half of Canada's visits occurring in the province. Tourism in Ontario generates $35.1 billion in receipts and contributes $34.4 billion to the total GDP. The industry supports around 92,000 businesses and creates 360,000 jobs.

The major cities in Ontario include Ottawa, Toronto, and Niagara Falls. Ottawa, the capital city of Canada is home to the Canadian Parliament Hill and the famous Rideau Canal. It also has numerous national galleries and museums including the National Gallery of Canada. Toronto is known for its CN Tower, which was once the tallest building in the world, and its performing arts, galleries, and various international events.

Tourist attractions in Ontario include various theme parks like Canada's Wonderland and the Toronto Zoo. Museums and galleries such as the Royal Ontario Museum and the Art Gallery of Ontario. Historical sites include Casa Loma and Fort William Historical Park. Hamilton is home to North America's oldest public aviary, the Hamilton Aviary, which opened in 1928. The province also has numerous provincial parks and conservation areas ideal for outdoor activities like camping, swimming, hiking, and paddling. Notable beaches include; Wasaga Beach, Sauble Beach, and Sandbanks Provincial Park.

=== Prince Edward Island ===
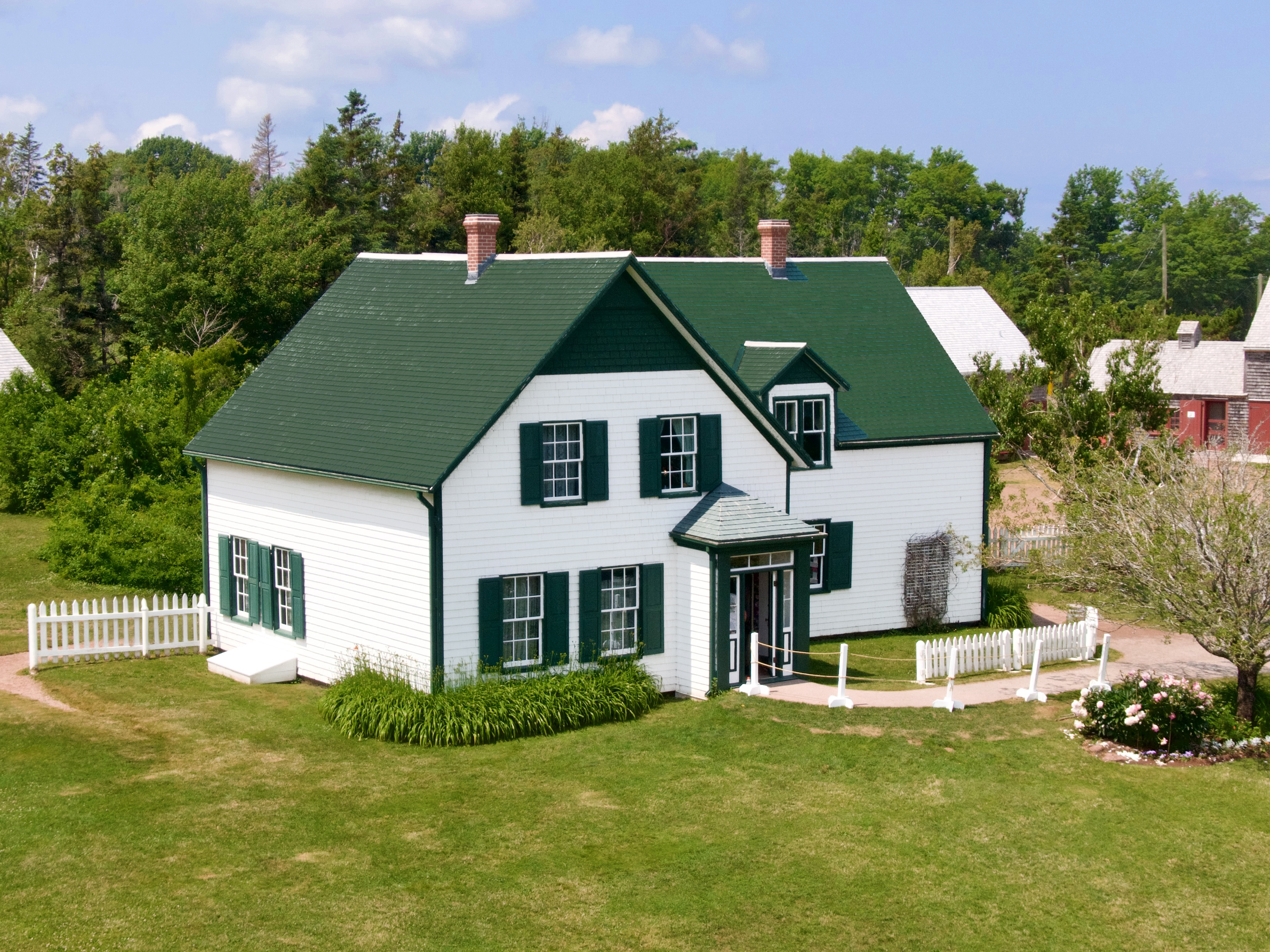
The Green Gables farmhouse located in Cavendish

In 2024, Prince Edward Island tourism generated $87.9 million in tax revenue and $520.7 million in visitor spending. Prince Edward Island, often referred to as the "Garden of the Gulf", tourism is based on its historical scenery, seafood cuisine, and literary tradition centred around the iconic Anne of Green Gables.

Attractions include Victoria Row, West Point Lighthouse, and the Confederation Bridge, one of the longest bridges in the world. Other popular attractions include Charlottetown's Victorian era street and Confederation Trail. The island is also renowned for its beaches, such as Cavendish Beach and Brackley Beach. The annual Charlottetown Festival focuses on the arts and features performances.

=== Quebec ===
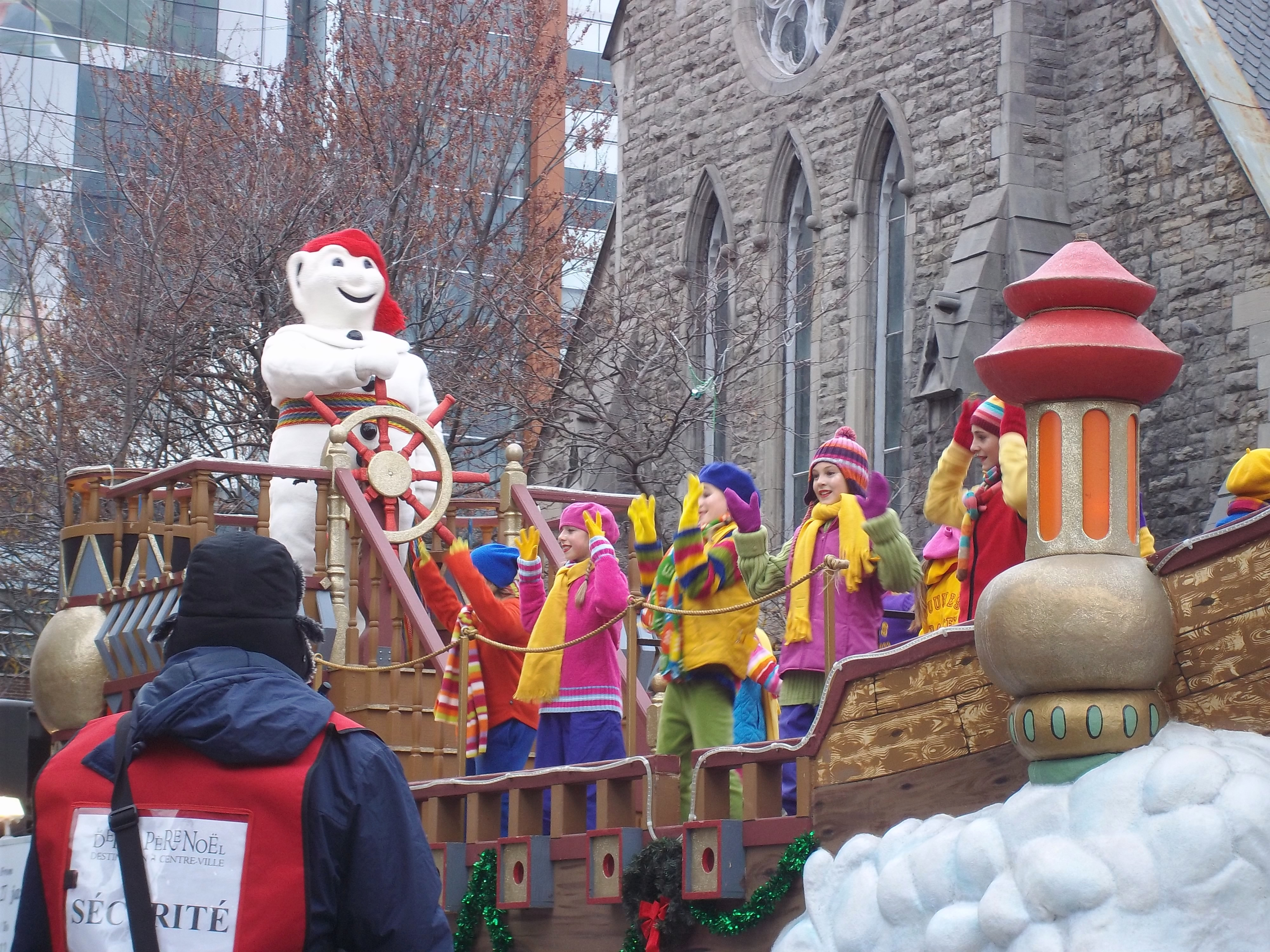
Quebec City's Winter Carnival is one of the world's largest winter festivals.

Tourism in Quebec generated over $16 billion in revenue, attracted approximately 62 million visitors, supported 24,000 businesses and employed nearly 407,000 individuals in 2023. Major destinations include the historic Old City of Quebec, the city of Montreal, and natural attractions like Mont-Tremblant National Park and Montmorency Falls. The province attracts millions of visitors with its unique historical sites and a wide range of seasonal activities. Popular attractions include the Chateau Frontenac, Notre-Dame Basilica, Cirque du Soleil and the Ice Hotel.

The province is divided into 21 tourist regions, including Abitibi-Témiscamingue, Bas-Saint-Laurent, Gaspésie, and Montreal. The St. Lawrence River, one of the world's largest rivers and attracts many boaters. The province is home to 27 national parks, the well-known is La Mauricie National Park was established in 1970. Another popular park is Jacques-Cartier National Park. Museums in Quebec also contribute significantly to the province's cultural landscape. The Musée de la civilisation in Quebec City attracts millions of visitors a year. In Montreal, the Montreal Museum of Fine Arts is home to numerous International domestic collections. As of July 2019, there were 198 National Historic Sites designated in Quebec, 30 of which are administered by Parks Canada.

=== Saskatchewan ===
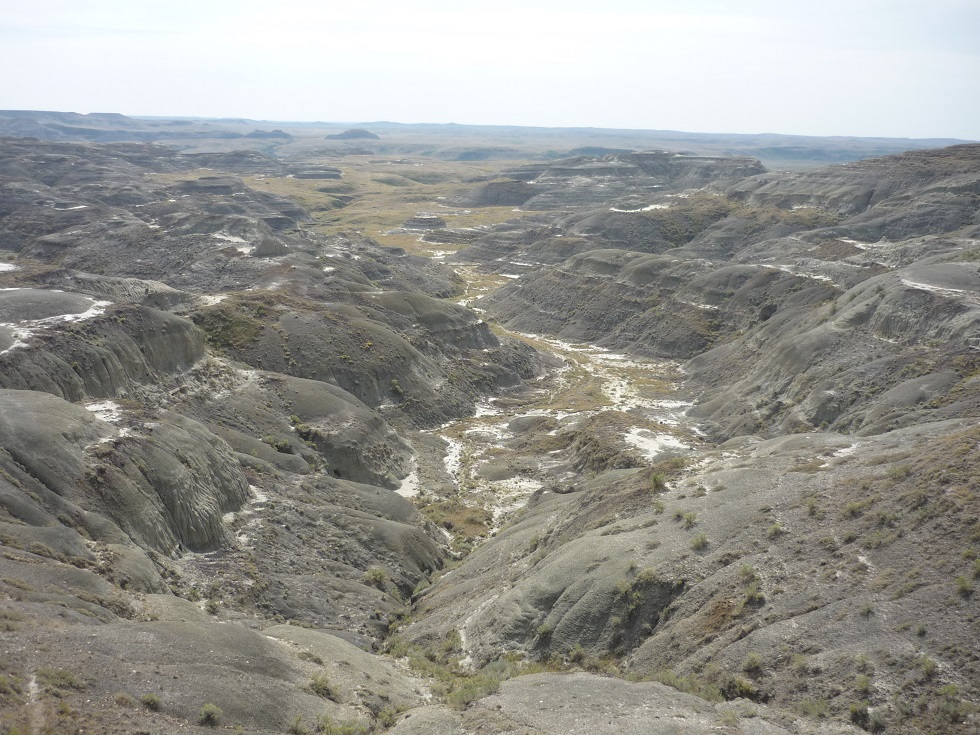
Grasslands National Park -The Valley of 1000 Devils in the East Block

Saskatchewan's tourism sector generated over $2 billion in revenue, with more than 12 million visitors in 2022. There are numerous heritages and cultural attractions in the Canadian province of Saskatchewan. Museums, dinosaur digs, aboriginal cultural and heritage sites, art galleries, professional sport venues, spas, handcraft, antique and tea shops, agricultural tours, theatre, and archaeological sites comprise over 600 varied Saskatchewan institutions.

There are two national parks located in the province of Saskatchewan: Grasslands National Park and Prince Albert National Park. There are also four National Historic Sites operated by Parks Canada in Saskatchewan including Fort Walsh National Historic Site, Batoche National Historic Site, Fort Battleford National Historic Site and Motherwell Homestead National Historic Site. There are 37 provincial parks, provincial recreation areas, natural areas, and a Heritage rangeland are also protected on a provincial level.

=== Yukon Territory ===
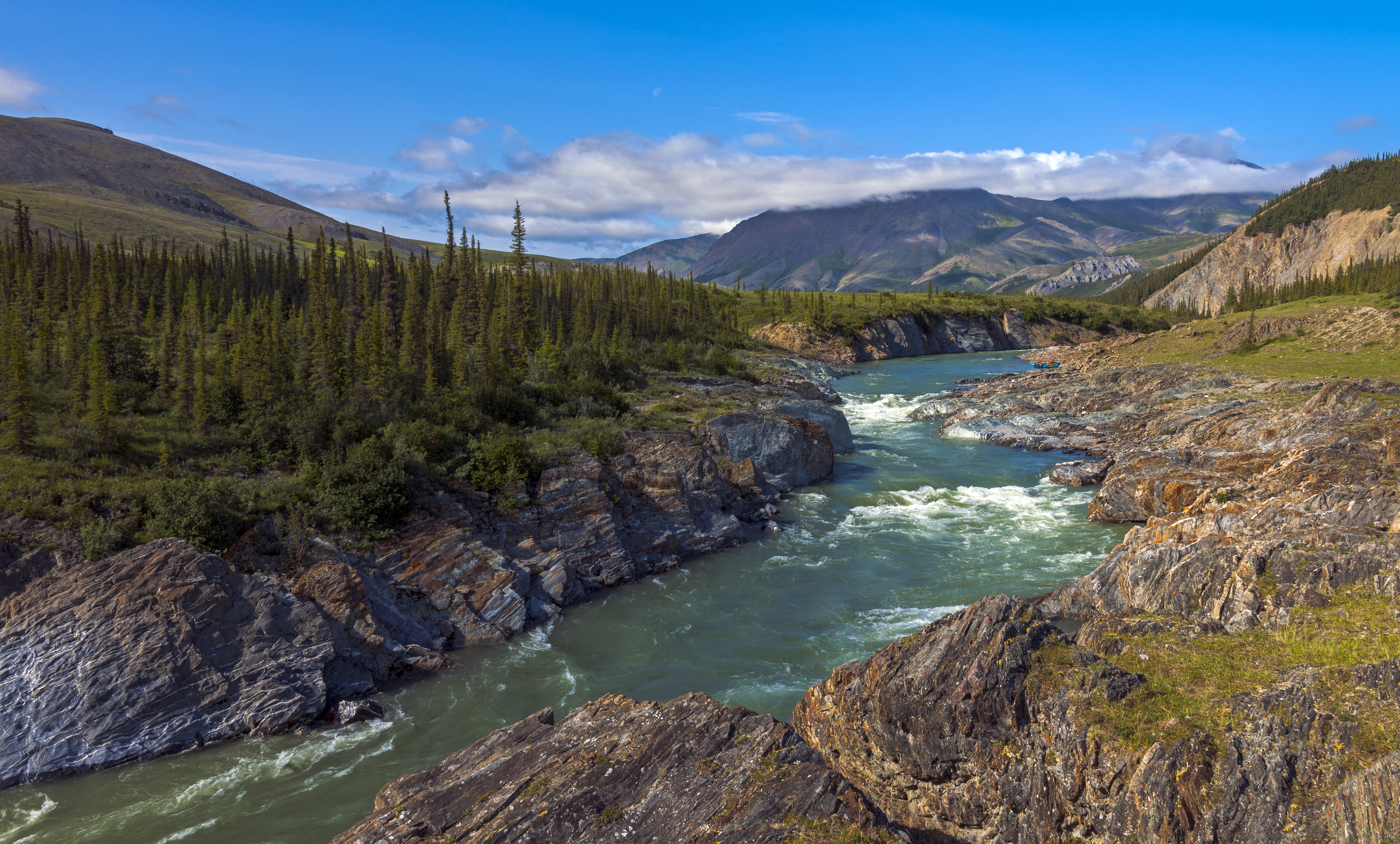
Ivvavik National Park is one of three national parks located in Yukon.

Tourism revenue in the Yukon garnered over $560 million in 2024. The territory's tourism motto is "Larger than life". Its tourism industry relies heavily on natural environment, with many organized outfitters and guides available for activities such as hunting, angling, canoeing/kayaking, hiking, skiing, snowboarding, ice climbing, and dog sledding. These activities are offered both in an organized setting or in the backcountry, which is accessible by air or snowmobile. The Yukon's festivals and sporting events include the Adäka Cultural Festival, Yukon International Storytelling Festival, and the Yukon Sourdough Rendezvous. The Yukon's latitude enables the view of aurora borealis.

The Yukon Government maintains a series of territorial parks, including parks such as Herschel Island Qikiqtaruk Territorial Park, Tombstone Territorial Park, Fishing Branch Ni'iinlii'njik Park, and Coal River Springs Territorial Park. Parks Canada, a federal agency of the Government of Canada, also maintains three national parks and reserves within the territory: Kluane National Park and Reserve, Ivvavik National Park, and Vuntut National Park.

The Yukon is also home to twelve National Historic Sites of Canada. The sites are also administered by Parks Canada, with five of the twelve sites being located within national parks. The territory is host to a number of museums, including the Copperbelt Railway & Mining Museum, the SS Klondike boat museum, the Yukon Beringia Interpretive Centre in Whitehorse; as well as the Keno City Mining Museum in Keno City. The territory also holds a number of enterprises that allows tourists to experience pre-colonial and modern cultures of Yukon's First Nations and Inuit.

== Visitor visa ==
Canada Visa not required; eTA not required Visa not required; eTA required for travel by air, not required by land or sea Visitors who held a Canadian visa within the last 10 years or currently hold a valid U.S. non-immigrant visa do not need a visa for air travel, but an eTA is required. For travel by land or sea, a visa is required Visa required

Holders of ordinary passports issued by over 50 "Visa-exempt countries and territories" are able to visit Canada without a visa for a period of up to 6 months. Other nationals will need a visitor visa to enter Canada, even if they are only going through Canadian airports. Visa officers can give one either a visa for one entry or a visa that lets one enter multiple times, and these can last up to ten years or until one's passport or biometrics run out. Generally, all visitors are allowed to stay in Canada for up to six months. However, a border services officer at the entry point can decide on a shorter or longer visit, marking the end date in one's passport or giving one a visitor record. If one does not get a stamp, the six-month period starts from when one arrives or until one's passport or biometrics expire. Those with a super visa who arrive after June 22, 2023, can stay for five years.

To enter Canada or obtain a visitor visa requirements include, a valid passport, a clear purpose for the visit, proof of financial support, and ties to their home country and a clean criminal record. In some cases, an invitation letter, or a medical examination and biometric information may also be required. ArriveCAN is a mobile app provided by the Canada Border Services Agency (CBSA) that allows travellers entering Canada to electronically submit travel documents and customs declarations. Information on travelling to Canada, border wait times, customs and immigration, insurance, and visa requirements can be acquired through multiple official Canadian government sites.

== See also ==
- List of hotels in Canada

To display all subcategories below click on the ►
