= Tourism in Ontario =

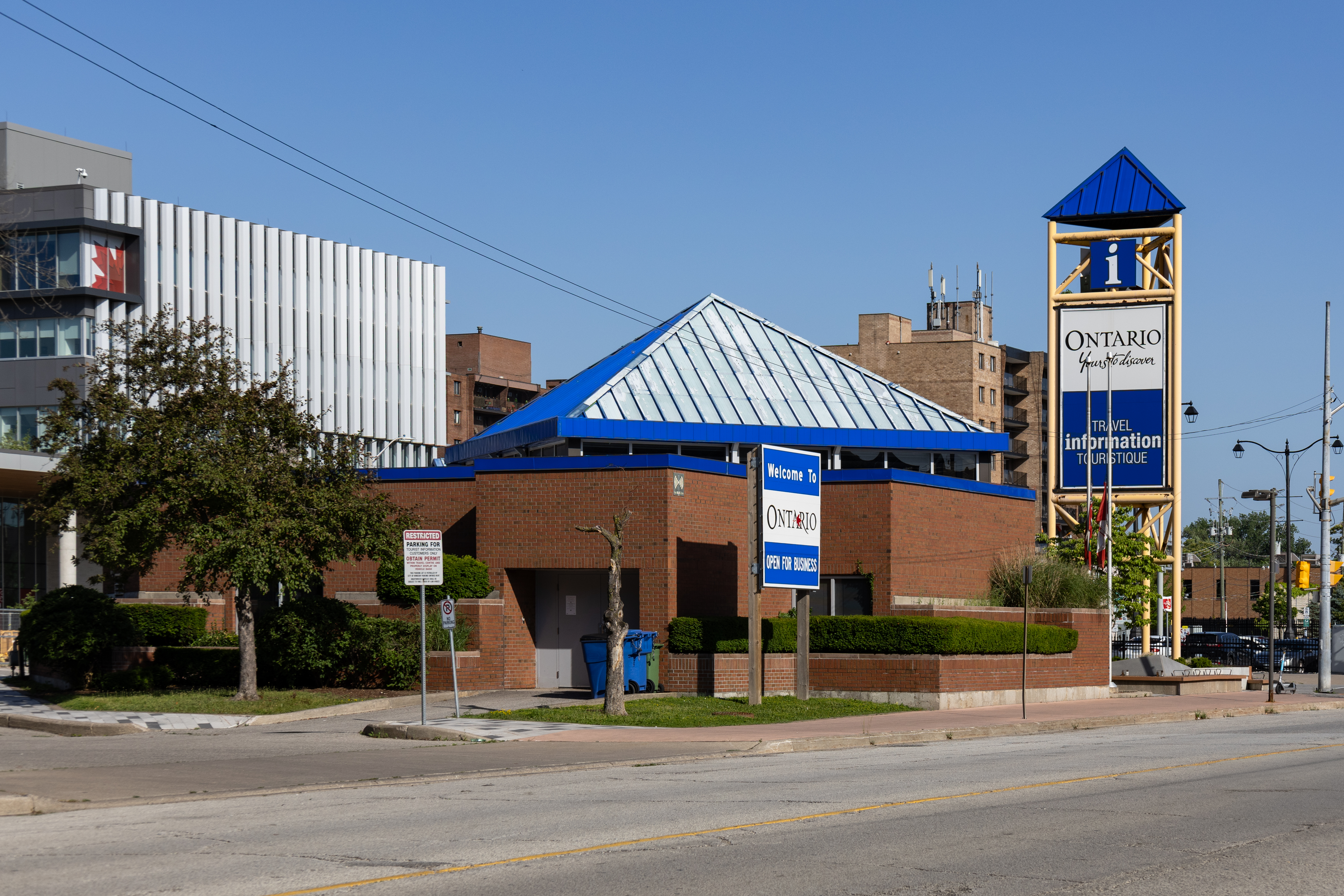
Ontario Travel Information Centres, found at most major points of entry, provide free tourism info about Ontario.

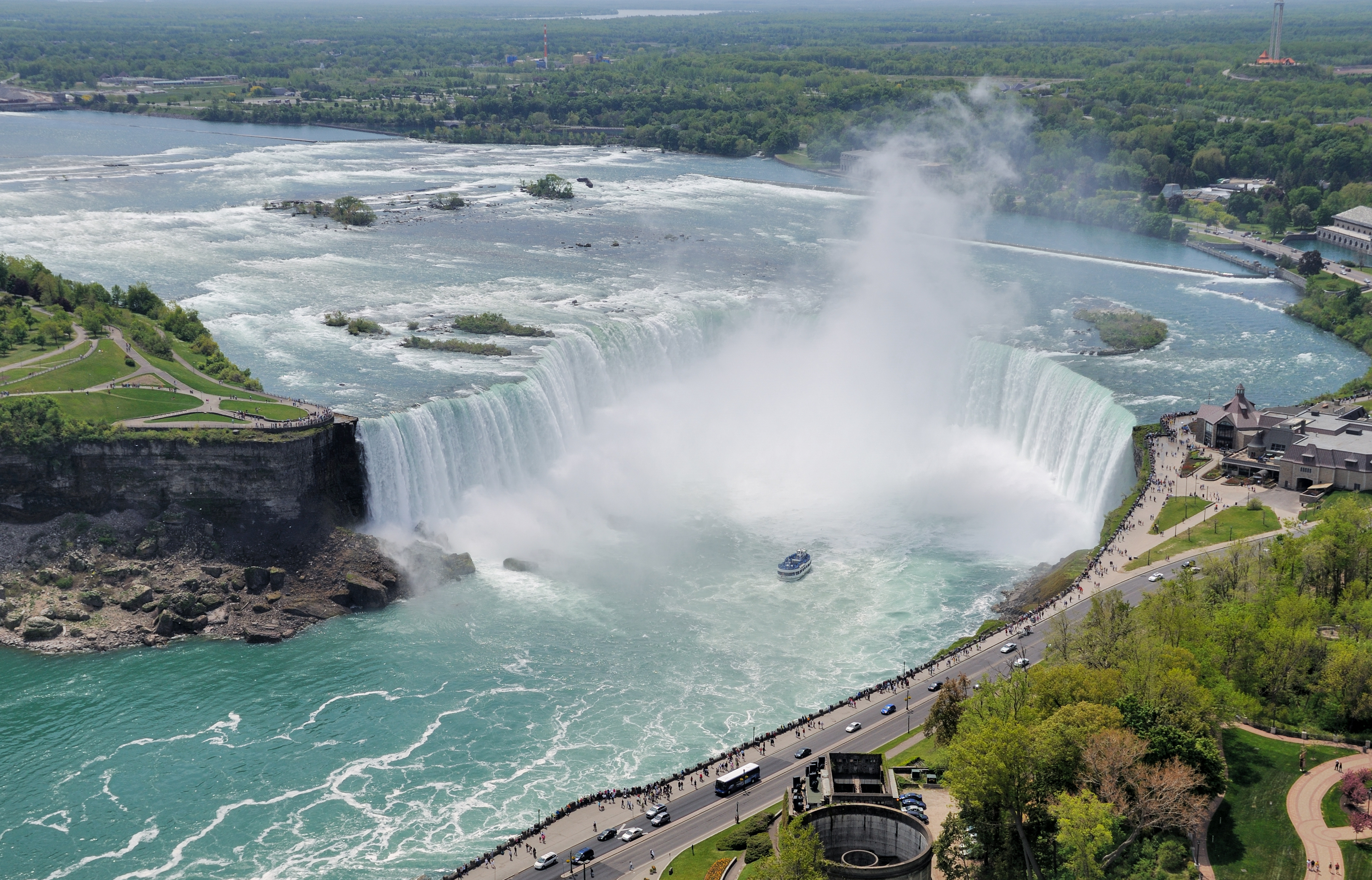
Niagara Falls is among one of the most visited tourist destinations.

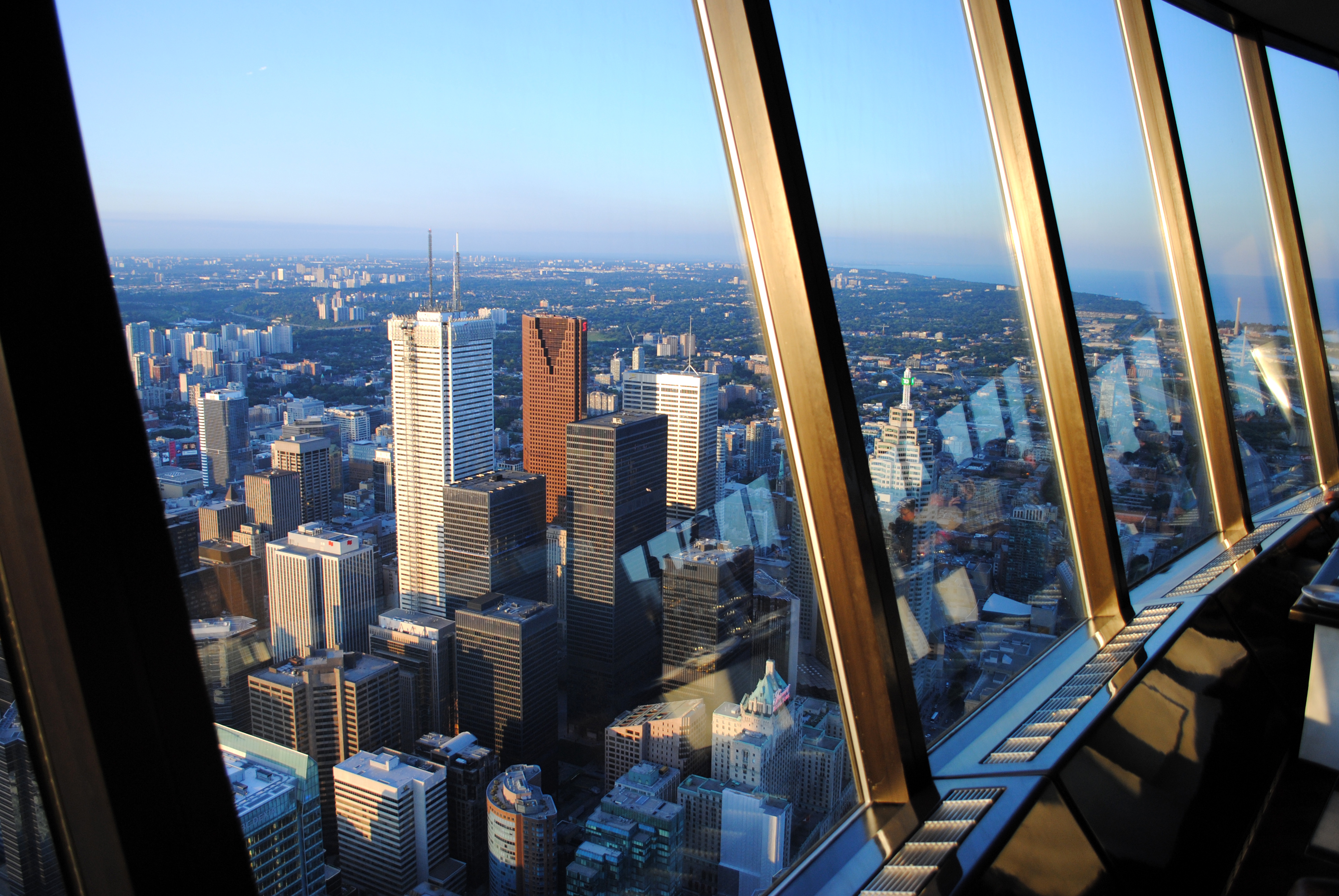
360 Restaurant, a rotating restaurant within the CN Tower

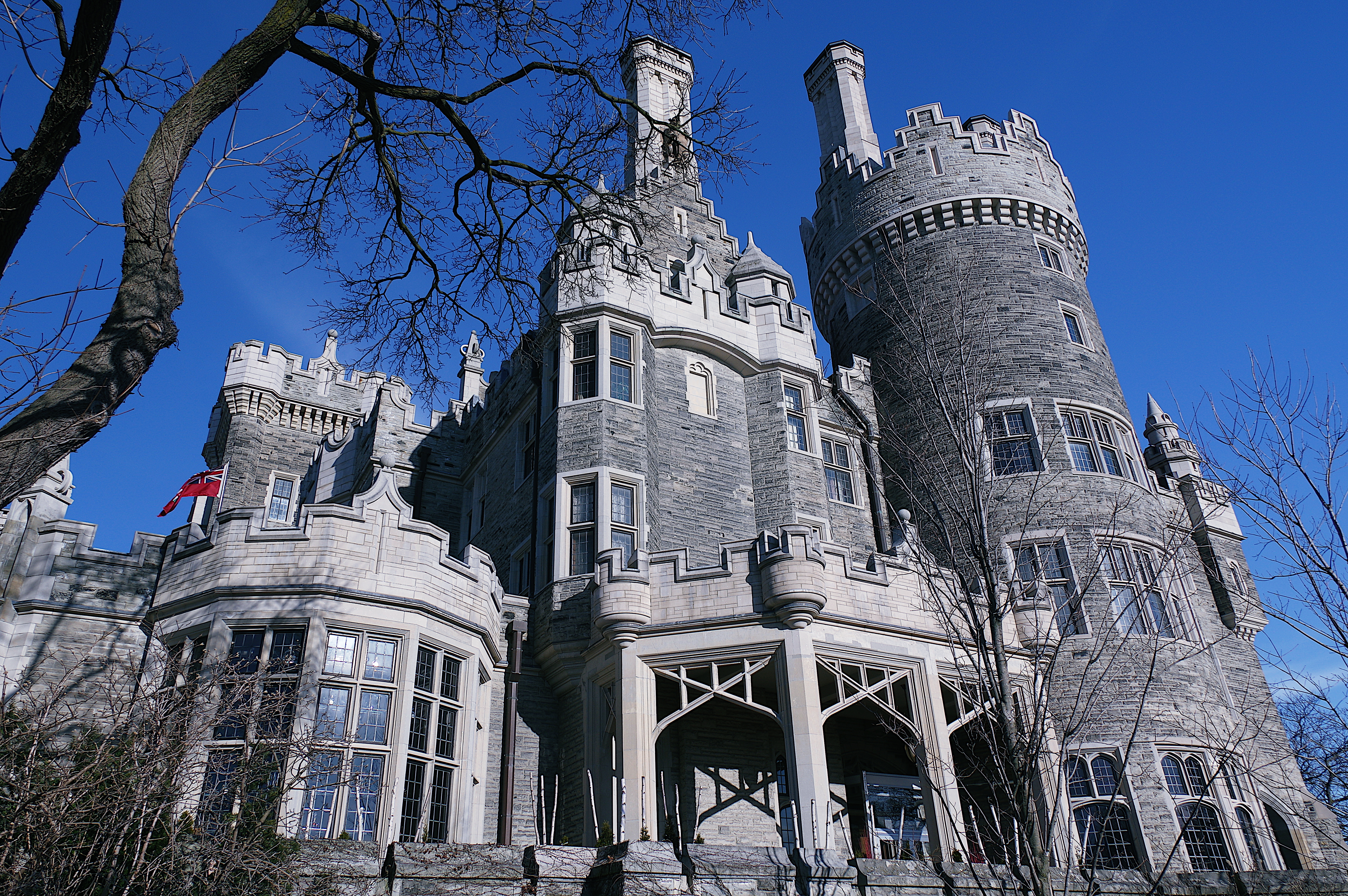
Casa Loma is a castle-style mansion of Gothic Revival architecture

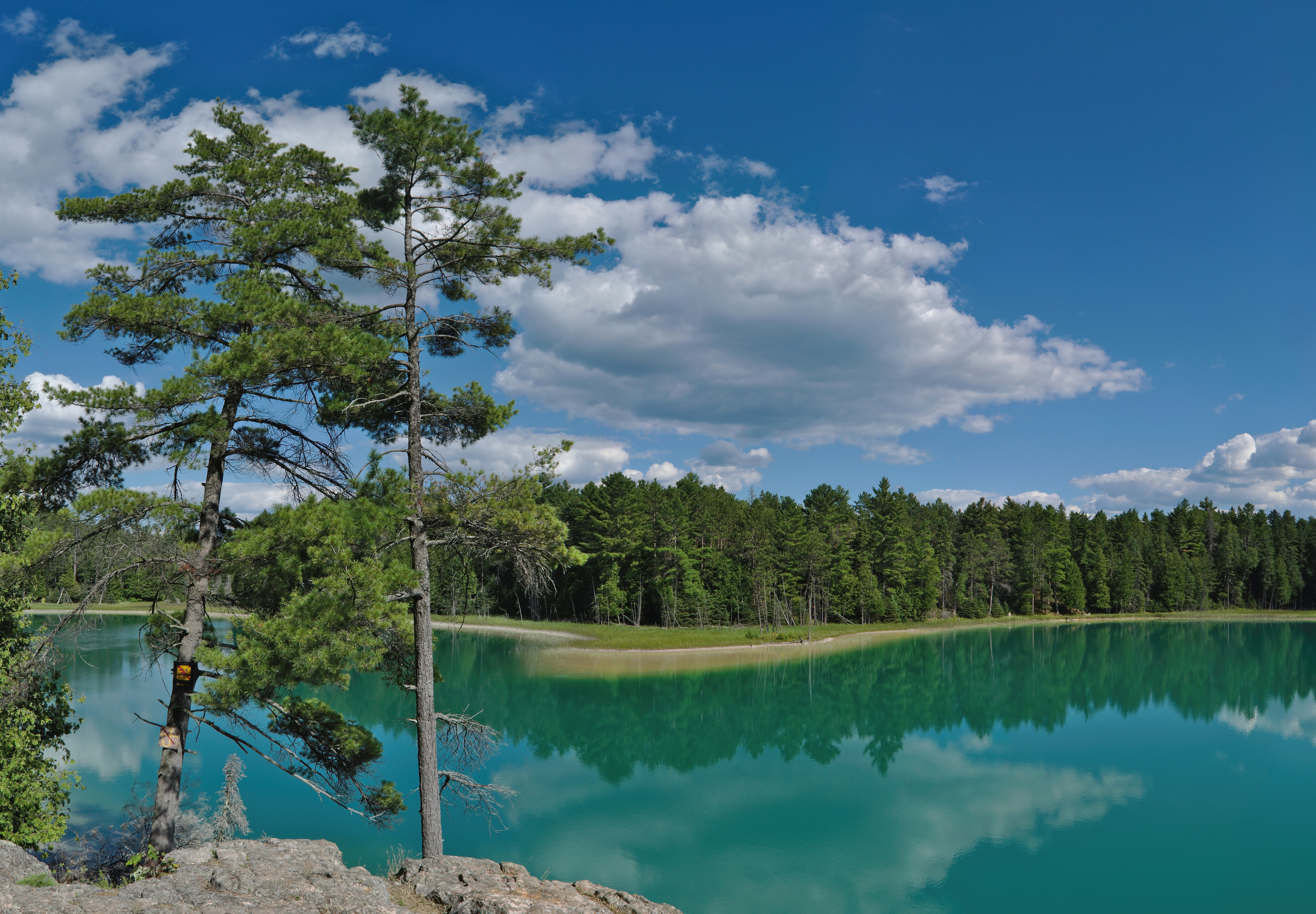
McGinnis Lake, a meromictic lake in Petroglyphs Provincial Park

Ontario is Canada's largest province by population and the second largest by area, Ontario is a top travel destination in Canada, attracting millions of tourists each year, with over half of Canada's visits occurring in the province. Tourism in Ontario generates $35.1 billion in receipts and contributes $34.4 billion to the total GDP. The industry supports around 92,000 businesses and creates 360,000 jobs.

The major cities in Ontario include Ottawa, Toronto, and Niagara Falls. Ottawa, the capital city of Canada is home to the Canadian Parliament Hill and the famous Rideau Canal. It also has numerous national galleries and museums including the National Gallery of Canada. Toronto is known for its CN Tower, which was once the tallest building in the world, and its performing arts, galleries, and various international events.

Tourist attractions in Ontario include various theme parks like Canada's Wonderland and the Toronto Zoo. Museums and galleries such as the Royal Ontario Museum and the Art Gallery of Ontario. Historical sites include Casa Loma and Fort William Historical Park. Hamilton is home to North America's oldest public aviary, the Hamilton Aviary, which opened in 1928. The province also has numerous provincial parks and conservation areas ideal for outdoor activities like camping, swimming, hiking, and paddling. Notable beaches include; Wasaga Beach, Sauble Beach, and Sandbanks Provincial Park.

== Tourist attractions ==
Theme parks include Canada's Wonderland, Wet'n'Wild Toronto, the Toronto Zoo and Centreville Amusement Park.

The Royal Ontario Museum, the Art Gallery of Ontario, the Canadian Museum of Nature, the Ontario Science Centre and Science North all offer programs for children. Historical sites include Casa Loma or Fort William Historical Park.

North America's oldest public aviary is located in Hamilton, Ontario. The Hamilton Aviary opened on June 1, 1928 at Dundurn Castle.

Ontario's Provincial Parks, the Canadian National Parks and Conservation Areas offer camping, swimming, hiking, paddling, and sightseeing. Ontario has more fresh water lakes than anywhere else in the world, its beaches include Wasaga Beach, Sauble Beach and Sandbanks Provincial Park.

=== Major cities ===
==== Ottawa ====
Ottawa is the capital city of Canada, and as such is the location of federal Canadian political buildings such as Parliament Hill. Ottawa is also known for its green spaces and its waterways: the Ottawa River, the Rideau River and the Rideau Canal (recently named a UNESCO World Heritage Site). Culturally, Ottawa offers many national galleries and museums such as the National Gallery of Canada, the National Arts Centre and the Canadian Museum of Civilization.

==== Toronto ====
The CN Tower, completed in 1975, was at one point the tallest structure in the world. Toronto is also a major scene for theatre and performing arts, as well as galleries, zoos, museums and internationally recognized events such as Caribana, the Toronto International Film Festival, and Pride Week. Toronto is also a popular destination for sport fans, with professional baseball, hockey, basketball, football, lacrosse and soccer teams playing throughout the year.

==== Niagara Falls ====
Niagara Falls is the city located beside the waterfalls of the same name.

=== Destination Ontario ===
Destination Ontario (legally the Ontario Tourism Marketing Partnership Corporation) is a government agency created in 1999 to promote Ontario as a travel destination both domestically and internationally.

== See also ==
- Tourism in Canada
