= Out in Canada =

Out In Canada is a travel magazine focused on gay and lesbian tourism, also known as LGBT tourism, exclusively within Canada. The magazine is printed twice yearly, and is distributed free in gay villages across North America.

Out In Canada is edited by Randall Shirley and owned by Out in Canada Inc., a Toronto-based company founded by lawyer and journalist Glenn Wheeler and group of other investors in 2006. Wheeler, who is also publisher of the magazine and website, was associate editor of the Toronto-based urban weekly NOW before becoming a lawyer.

In 2007, journalist Margaret Webb received a Northern Lights Award (one of only 13 annually) for her Out In Canada lesbian travel story about ice wines and travel in Canada's Niagara Region, presented by the Canadian Tourism Commission.
