= Destination Canada =

Canadian Crown corporation

Agency overview
- Formed: 1995
- Jurisdiction: Government of Canada
- Headquarters: Vancouver, British Columbia
- Minister responsible: Melanie Joly, Minister of Industry
- Agency executive: Marsha Walden, Chief Executive Officer
- Website: destinationcanada.com

Destination Canada, formerly the Canadian Tourism Commission (CTC; French: Commission canadienne du tourisme (CCT)), was created in 1995 to promote tourism in Canada. It is a Crown corporation, wholly owned by the Government of Canada, which reports to the Minister of Small Business and Tourism and the Minister of Innovation, Science and Economic Development.

Destination Canada states that it "is dedicated to promoting the growth and profitability of the Canadian tourism industry by marketing Canada as a desirable travel destination and providing timely and accurate information to the Canadian tourism industry to assist in its decision making." It also claims to "recognise that the greatest source of tourism knowledge and expertise rests with the tourism industry itself. Therefore, Destination Canada designs, delivers and funds marketing and research initiatives in partnership with provincial and regional tourism associations, government agencies, hoteliers, tour operators, airlines and attractions managers."

It has operated marketing campaigns in Australia, Brazil, China, France, Germany, India, Japan, South Korea, Mexico, the United Kingdom and the United States. In January 2026, Destination Canada signed a cooperation agreement with China Media Group.

The organization is headed by a 10-person board of directors which is overseen by a President and chief executive officer, chosen from the combined private and public sector nature of the industry to represent the various regions of Canada as well as the country's demographic composition.

== See also ==
- Destination Ontario: the provincial counterpart of Destination Canada in the province of Ontario.
