= Global Sustainable Tourism Council =

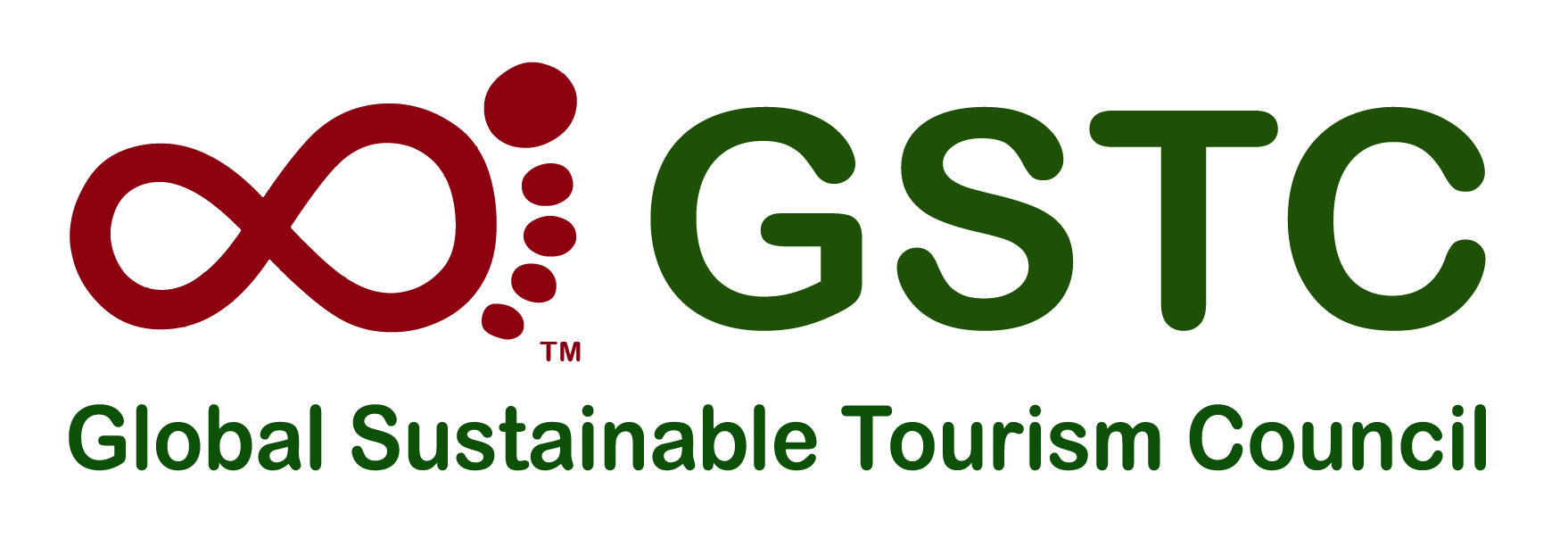
- Logo of the Global Sustainable Tourism Council (GSTC), resembling a footprint and an infinity symbol
- Abbreviation: GSTC
- Formation: 2010
- Type: Nonprofit organization
- Purpose: To establish and manage global standards for sustainable travel and tourism.
- Headquarters: United States
- Website: https://www.gstcouncil.org/

The Global Sustainable Tourism Council (GSTC) is a non-profit organization that establishes and manages global standards for sustainable travel and tourism, known as the GSTC Criteria. The council serves as an international accreditation body for sustainable tourism certification programs.

The GSTC is legally registered in the United States as a 501(c)(3) nonprofit and operates independently and neutrally. It includes members from a wide range of tourism-related sectors, including governments, NGOs, businesses, academic institutions, and destination managers. It is recognized by the United Nations World Tourism Organization (UNWTO) and works in alignment with global sustainability frameworks.

== History ==
The GSTC was formed in 2010 through the merger of the "Partnership for Global Sustainable Tourism Criteria" (established in 2007) and the "Sustainable Tourism Stewardship Council". Founding partners include the United Nations Foundation, the UN World Tourism Organization (UNWTO), the United Nations Environment Programme (UNEP), and the NGO Rainforest Alliance.

== GSTC Criteria ==
The organization maintains two sets of standards collectively known as the GSTC Criteria:

- The GSTC Criteria for Destinations (GSTC-D), aimed at public sector bodies and destination managers
- The GSTC Criteria for Industry (GSTC-I), intended for hotels and tour operators

These criteria are regarded as minimum global standards for sustainable tourism. They are structured around four main themes:

1. Effective sustainability planning
2. Maximizing social and economic benefits for the local community
3. Enhancing cultural heritage
4. Reducing negative environmental impacts

The criteria are used for education, training, policy development, measuring sustainability performance, and serve as the basis for third-party certification schemes. The GSTC itself does not directly certify organizations or products; rather, it accredits certification bodies that apply the GSTC standards through a process known as the GSTC Integrity Program.

== Objectives ==
The GSTC aims to improve awareness and implementation of sustainable tourism practices across both public and private sectors. Its objectives include:

- Developing and maintaining international sustainability standards
- Supporting sustainable management in tourism destinations
- Facilitating access to sustainable tourism markets
- Promoting best practices and capacity-building
- Contributing to the validation and harmonization of sustainability certifications

== See also ==
- Sustainable tourism
