= Fort William Historical Park =

Historical site in Thunder Bay, Ontario

Coordinates: 48°20′34″N 89°21′30″W

- Former name: Old Fort William
- Established: 1973
- Location: Thunder Bay, Ontario, Canada.
- Type: Historical Park
- General Manager: Patrick Morash
- Owners: Ontario Ministry of Tourism, Culture and Gaming
- Public transit access: Thunder Bay Transit 4
- Website: www.fwhp.ca

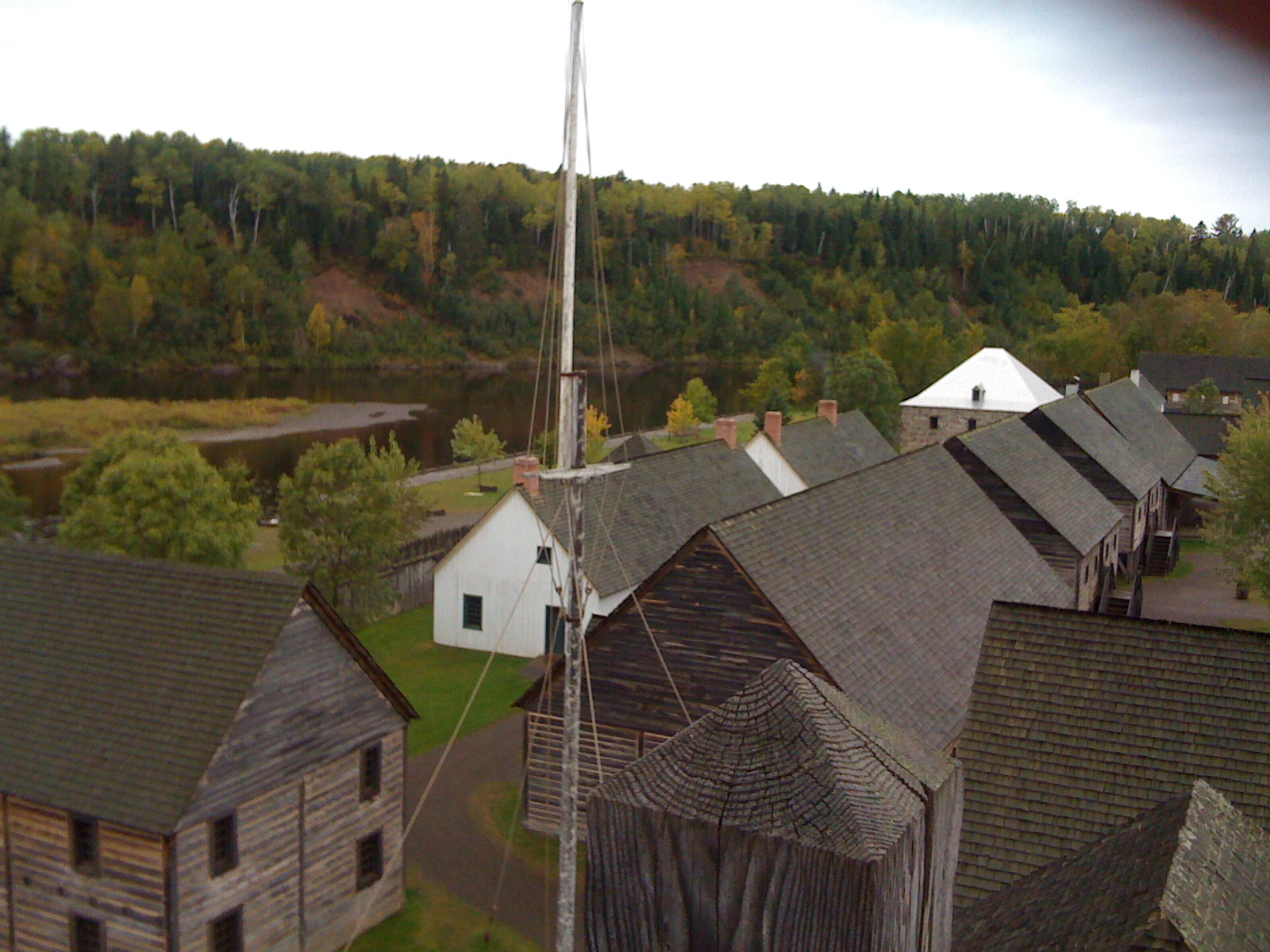
A view of the fort from the lookout post.

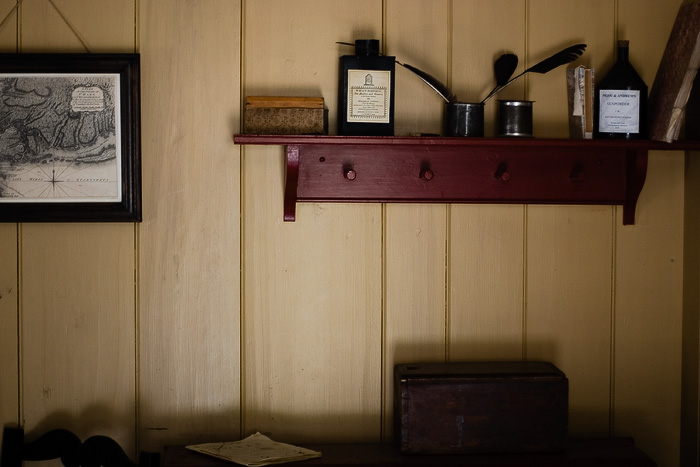
A typical room at Fort William Historical Park.

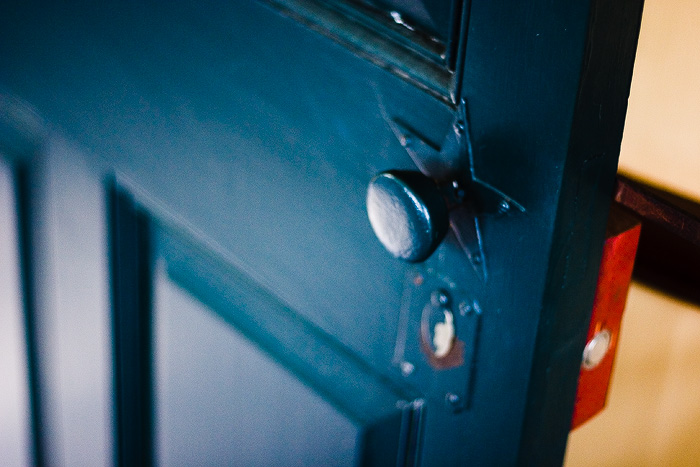
A star-shaped door handle.

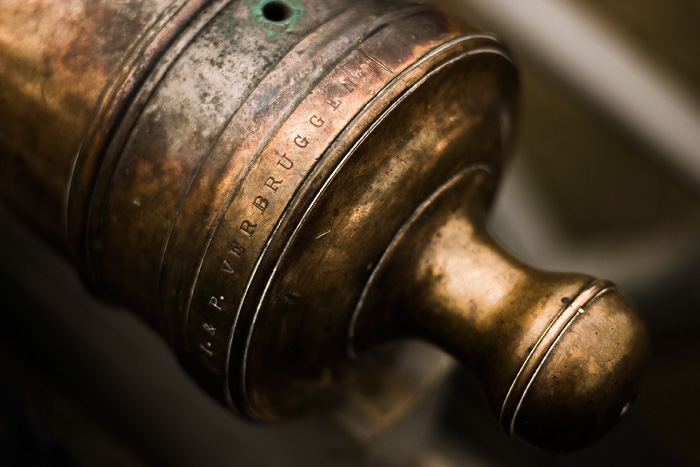
One of the cannons near the main entrance to the park. The inscription reads I. & P. VERBRUGGEN.

Fort William Historical Park (formerly known as Old Fort William) is a Canadian historical site located in Thunder Bay, Ontario, that contains a reconstruction of the Fort William fur trade post as it existed in 1815. It officially opened on July 3, 1973.

The site is located on the banks of the Kaministiquia River at Point de Meuron. This point is a few kilometres upstream from the original fort's site, Fort Kaministiquia, which has been built over as part of the city of Thunder Bay. Point de Meuron has separate historical significance, as it was the location of an Hudson's Bay Company post of the same name.

== History ==
The North West Company had a major depot at Grand Portage to the west of Fort William. After the American Revolutionary War, Britain finally ceded the area to the United States (US) under the Jay Treaty of 1796, to settle the northern border. British/Canadian fur traders wanted to create a new center of operations to avoid US taxes, and so the trading post was moved north to what became Fort William on the Canadian side of the border.

Fort William Historical Park is known as a living history site. Numerous historic buildings have been reconstructed to show the range of the post, and costumed historical interpreters recreate Fort William of the year 1816. Fort William was then not primarily a settlement, but a central transport depot within the now-defunct North West Company's network of fur trade outposts. In 1816, Lord Selkirk took control of the fort and it became a Hudson's Bay Company post in 1821. The fort's original buildings were dismantled in 1902 and a plaque was placed at the site by the Thunder Bay Historical Society. Due to its central role, Fort William was much larger, with more facilities than the average fur trade post. Reflecting this, Fort William Historical Park contains 42 reconstructed buildings, a reconstructed Ojibwa village, and a small farm.

Historical interpreters represent the many roles and cultures involved in the fur trade, including Scottish fur traders (people of capital), who often took Native American wives and had their families living with them; French Canadian voyageurs and workers, who also had wives from among the Natives; and native hunters and trappers. The native people in the Fort William area are predominantly Ojibwa and are represented accordingly among the interpreters.

The North West Company's "winter partners", fur traders who lived at the post, in the early years married into the upper classes of the native people, strengthening their alliances. There were thus two tiers of society - the fur traders and chiefs and their daughters, and the workers, who formed liaisons or married native women. The descendants of the latter tended to stay in fur trapping and became the Métis ethnic group. While also of mixed heritage, children of fur traders and chief's daughters tended to receive thorough English educations (as well as learning Native culture from their mothers' families) and often moved within the upper classes of Canadian society, including being selected for government posts.

Fort William Historical Park has a working community of skilled tradesmen, including a blacksmith, tinsmith, carpenter, cooper, and birch bark canoe builder. They all craft products according to traditional early 19th-century methods and tools. Many of their crafts are not widely practised elsewhere. Fort William's canoe builder has built birch bark canoes for other Canadian cultural sites, including the Canadian Museum of Civilization.

Each summer Fort William Historical Park hosts the "Great Rendezvous", a recreation of the annual meeting of company fur traders that took place at this central location. Participants from all over Canada and the United States register to camp for the weekend at Fort William Historical Park and take part in this historical reenactment.

== Legacy ==
On 28 June 1985 Canada Post issued 'Fort William, Ont.' one of the 20 stamps in the “Forts Across Canada Series” (1983 & 1985). The stamps are perforated 12 1/2 x 13 mm and were printed by Ashton-Potter Limited based on the designs by Rolf P. Harder.

== Location ==
The park is located at the south end of King Road, which runs off of Broadway Avenue two kilometres west of Highway 61. Thunder Bay Transit’s route 4 Neebing makes several trips that include Fort William Historical Park throughout the daytime on weekdays.

== Amphitheatre ==
In 2008 the fort built an amphitheatre to host a variety of events. It is one of Canada's largest purpose-built outdoor entertainment venues. The Amphitheatre is designed to host events with audience sizes up to 50,000. It is configured to be capable of hosting multiple independent events at the same time. The Amphitheatre is a year-round venue, capable of featuring six regulation-size hockey ice surfaces in the winter, and a full-service campground during special events and concerts in the summer.

== Affiliations ==
The museum is affiliated with: CMA, CHIN, and Virtual Museum of Canada.

== See also ==
- List of contemporary amphitheaters
