= Chilkat State Park =

State park in Alaska, United States

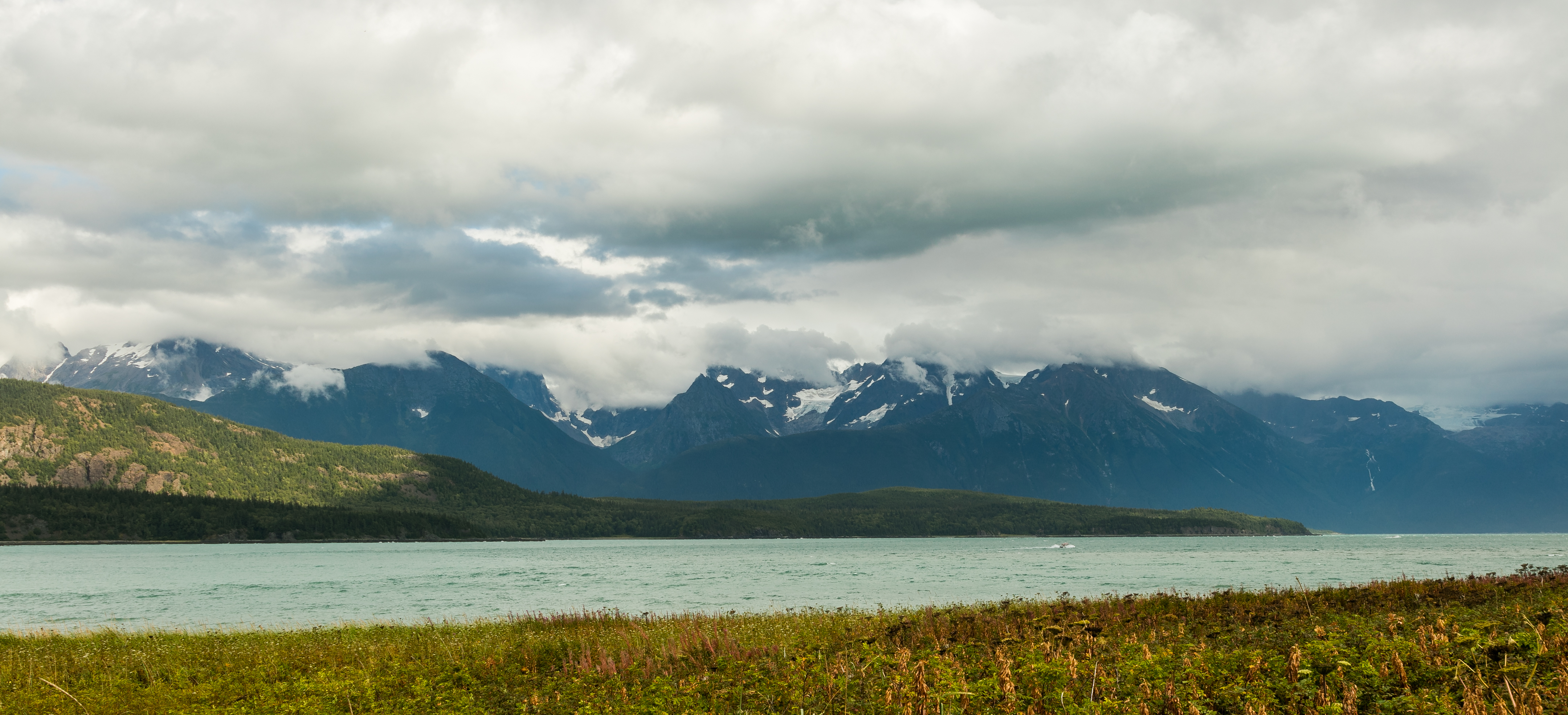
- Interactive map of Chilkat State Park
- Type: Forest, Coastal
- Location: Chilkat Peninsula, Haines Borough, Alaska, USA
- Coordinates: 59°12′40″N 135°23′53″W
- Area: 9,837 acres (3,981 ha)
- Elevation: 719 feet (219 m)
- Operator: Department of Natural Resources, Alaska State Parks

Chilkat State Park is a 9,837-acre (3,980 ha) Alaska state park on a peninsula south of the town of Haines, Alaska between the Chilkat and Chilkoot inlets. Remote and known for the steep 14% grade gravel access road, the park offers campsites with minimal amenities and is open to fishing, hiking, boating, sea kayaking, and sightseeing. The campground is closed from October to mid-May due to winter concerns.

== History ==
In 1970, Clem Tillion, a member of the State House, and Senator Bob Palmer, both Republicans, introduced legislation to set aside 300,000 acres of land in Kachemak Bay to create the state park and wilderness area. On May 9, 1970, the Alaska Legislature established the park at Kachemak Bay and authorized the governor to set aside additional lands as state parks. Within five months—from May to October—the park system grew to 913,000 acres. A park near Haines, to be named Chilkat State Park, was included in this section, and later that year the northern segment, initially called 'Battery Point State Recreation Area,' was opened. The full park was not enacted until 1975. In a proclamation made by the governor on June 22, 1976, the northern and newly created southern segments were renamed 'Chilkat State Park.' The park was originally 6,056.3 acres, but has grown by private donation and legislative action through the years.

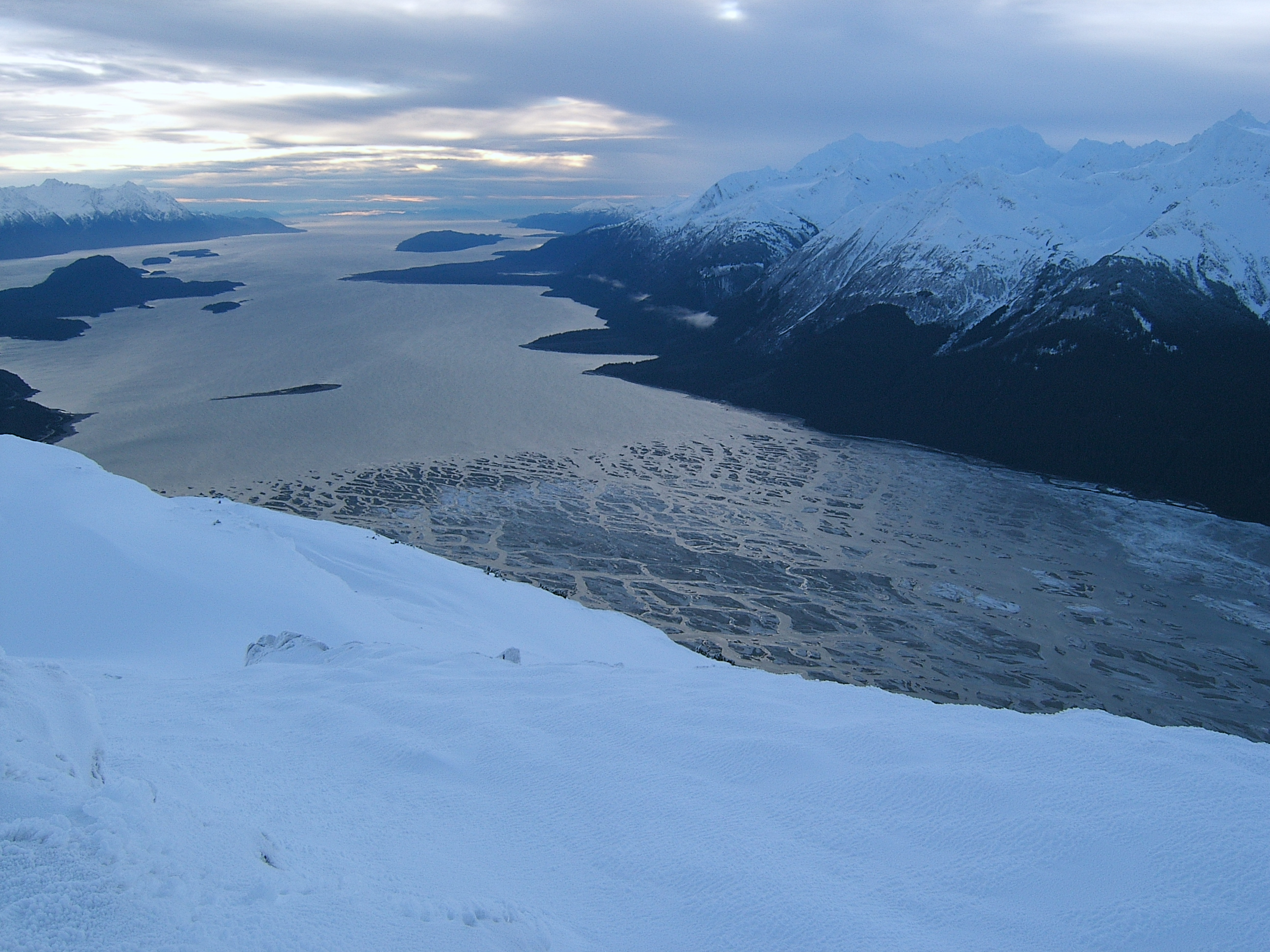
Looking out Chilkat Inlet from the Takshanuk Mountains. The tip of the Chilkat Peninsula can be seen in the background.

== Fishing and boating ==
The park offers plenty of opportunities for anglers. The Chilkat River is considered the most productive coho spawning and rearing area in southeast Alaska, which also provides a habitat for wild sockeye, Chinook and chum salmon. In June boaters can enter the inlets for the king salmon run using the park's boat launch. To the south of the park, across the inlets, is Chilkat Islands State Marine Park and Sullivan Island State Marine Park, which offer boaters additional areas to explore and more sights to see.

Sea kayaking is another way to get around the inlets surrounding the park. Due to the shallow waters surrounding many of the channel islands, a kayaker can get into places boaters can't in order to spy on the many wildlife species that make their home in the area.

== Hiking and sightseeing ==
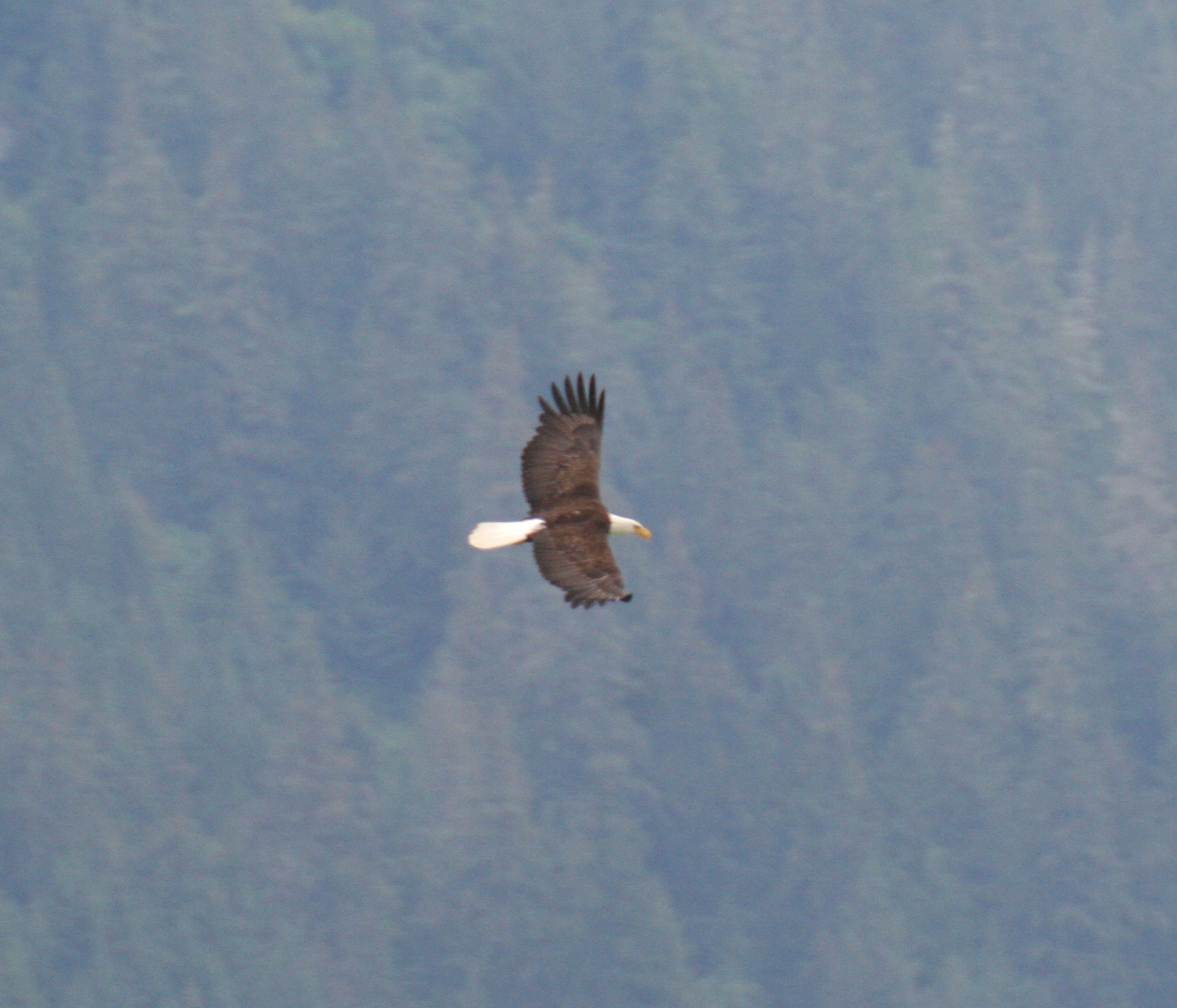
A bald eagle near Chilkat State Park

The park is located seven miles south of Haines in northern part of the Alaska Panhandle, on Mud Bay Rd. on the Chilkat Peninsula. It offers hikers three trails of varying degrees of difficulty. For an easy hike, one can take the Seduction Point Trail that stays close to the coastline and weaves its way through forest and beach for about seven miles. Another easy trail to take is the Battery Point Trail. Its two-mile length starts in the forest and ends on the beach. For the more adventurous hiker there is the Mount Riley Trail. This trail features steep vertical rises but also offers the hiker a view of the entire park and inlets.

=== Wildlife viewing ===
Because the park is very remote, visitors have many opportunities to see a variety of wildlife. Black and brown bears, mountain goats, and moose frequent the park and surrounding areas. Spotting scopes are provided, located at the information center that allow visitors to see wildlife far out into the inlet. This includes humpback and orca, harbor seals, harbor porpoises, and sea lions. Quite a few different species of birds can be spotted around the park as well, a favorite of visitors being the bald eagle. Others include trumpeter swans, boreal owls, common loons, and kingfishers.

=== Mountain and glacier viewing ===
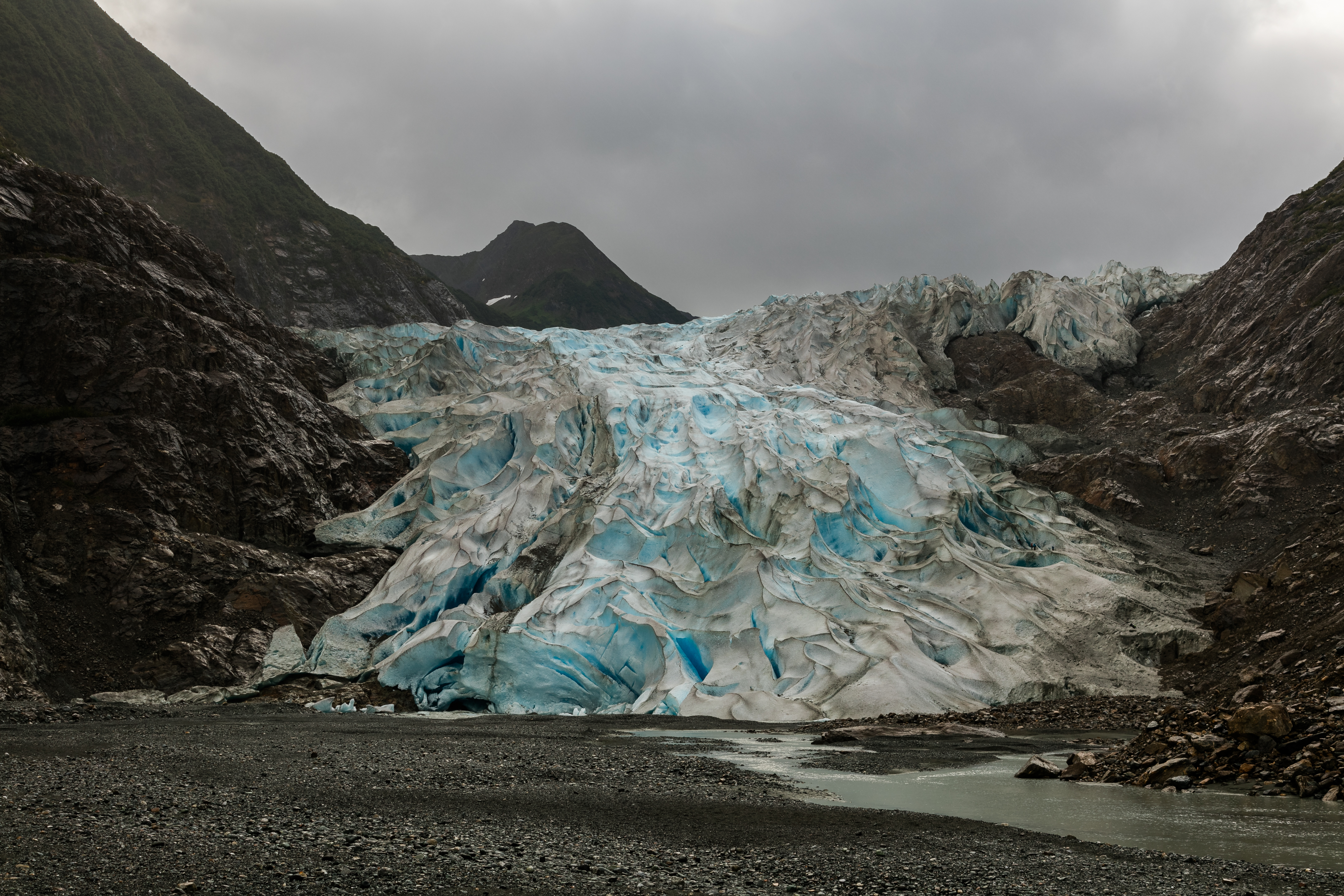
Davidson Glacier, Haines, Alaska, USA

Chilkat State Park and—more generally, the Haines area—are situated at the convergence of North America's interior and the waters of the Inside Passage. As such is the case the small peninsula is surrounded by deep channels and steep rising mountains. The Chilkat Range, Takinsha Mountains, Takshanuk Mountains, and Coast Mountains all meet at this point and provide many views of mountain peaks close to open waters. The park offers a view of two major glaciers in the area. One is Rainbow Glacier, which is about 1.5 miles long and sits at an elevation of 5,164 feet (1,574 meters). It is a hanging glacier with a waterfall dropping from its face. The other glacier, the larger of the two, is Davidson Glacier, at about 4.6 miles long and an elevation of 3,875 feet (1,181 meters). The glacier was named after George Davidson, a geographer whose published report influenced the United States' purchase of Alaska from Russia in 1867.
