= Chilkat Valley News =

Newspaper in Alaska, United States

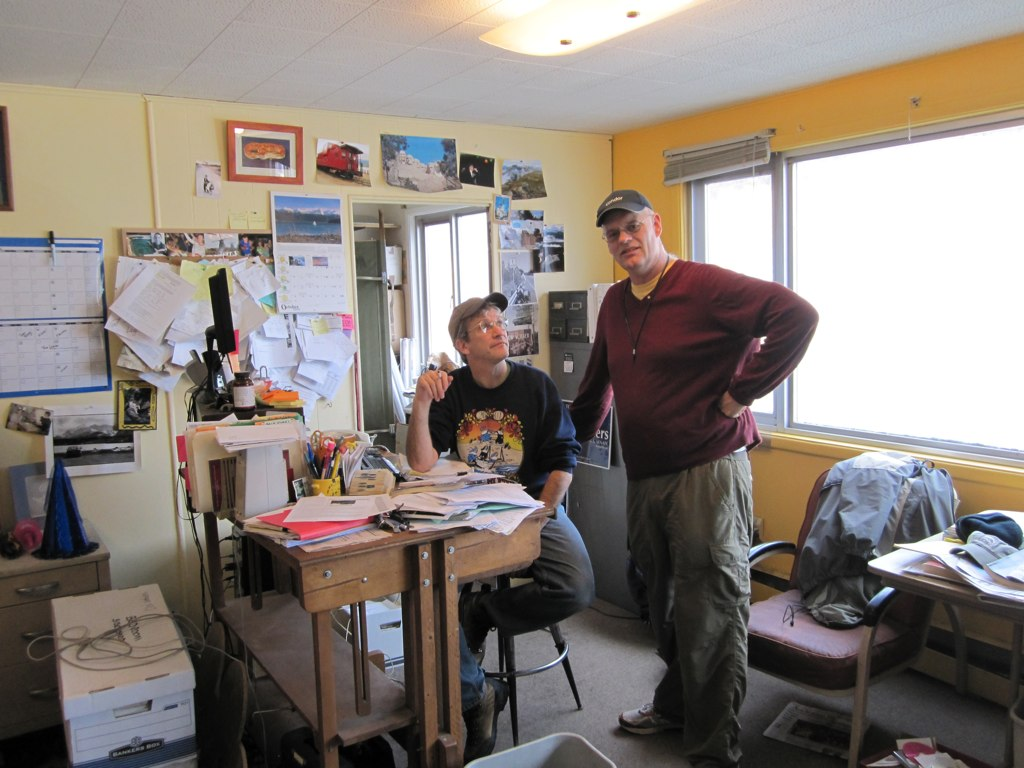
- Travel writer Scott McMurren visits the Chilkat Valley News, the newspaper for Haines, Alaska.
- Type: Weekly newspaper
- Format: Broadsheet
- Owner: Rashah McChesney
- Publisher: Kyle Clayton
- Founded: 1966
- Language: English
- Headquarters: 229 Main St; Haines, AK 99827; United States
- Circulation: 1,100
- ISSN: 8750-3336
- Website: chilkatvalleynews.com

The Chilkat Valley News is a weekly newspaper serving the Chilkat Valley/Haines Borough area of Southeast Alaska. The paper principally serves the communities of Haines, where it is published, and Klukwan. It is printed in Petersburg and published on Thursdays.

The newspaper features local news, obituaries, and "Duly Noted," an about-town column written by locals, including Doris Ward and Heather Lende (author, National Public Radio commentator, and Anchorage Daily News columnist.)

== History ==
The newspaper was founded in 1966 by Haines school teacher Ray Menaker and a student printer, Bill Hartmann. The first edition appeared January 3 without a title, instead asking readers to choose a name from a list of 18 suggested ones, including Haines Independent Grapevine and Lynn Canal Drift.

Menaker sold the newspaper in the mid-1980s to Bonnie Hedrick. In 2012, Hedrick sold the paper to Tom Morphet who ran for public office in 2016 and distanced himself from the paper. In June 2017, Kyle Clayton, bought the paper from Morphet. Clayton sold the paper on Jan. 1, 2024, to journalist Rashah McChesney.

== Awards ==
The Chilkat Valley News has won numerous awards from the Alaska Press Club, the newspaper ranked first place for Best Picture Story in 2024, and Best Weekly Newspaper in 2013, 2014, and 2023.
