= Mud Bay, Alaska =

Mud Bay, Alaska Ḵutlkw G̱eeyí
- Census-designated place
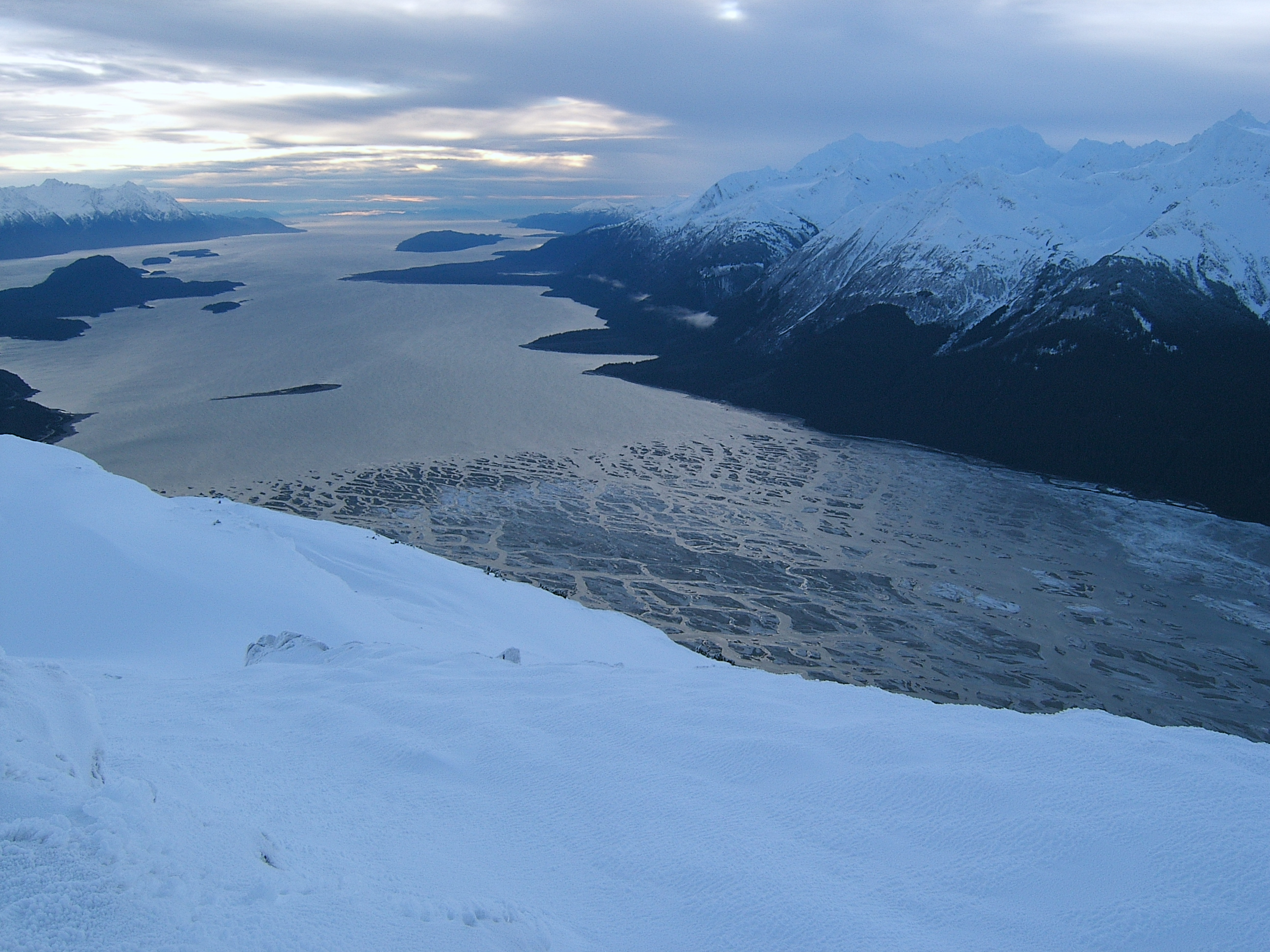
- Mud Bay is on the dark peninsula on the left-hand side of the image

- Location within Alaska
- Coordinates: 59°8′54″N 135°21′12″W
- Country: United States
- State: Alaska
- Borough: Haines

Government
  - Borough mayor: Douglas Olerud
  - State senator: Jesse Kiehl (D)
  - State rep.: Andi Story (D)

Area
  - Total: 12.16 sq mi (31.50 km^{2})
  - Land: 12.14 sq mi (31.43 km^{2})
  - Water: 0.023 sq mi (0.06 km^{2})
- Elevation: 72 ft (22 m)

Population (2020)
  - Total: 159
  - Density: 13.1/sq mi (5.06/km^{2})
- Time zone: UTC-9 (Alaska (AKST))
  - Summer (DST): UTC-8 (AKDT)
- ZIP code: 99827
- Area code: 907
- FIPS code: 02-51455
- GNIS feature ID: 1865558

Mud Bay (Lingít: Ḵutlkw G̱eeyí) is a census-designated place (CDP) in Haines Borough, Alaska, United States. As of the 2020 census, Mud Bay had a population of 159.

== Geography ==
Mud Bay is located in central Haines Borough at 59°8′54″N 135°21′12″W (59.148234, -135.353359), on the Chilkat Peninsula. It is bordered to the east by the Chilkoot Inlet and to the west by the Chilkat Inlet, and extends south to the end of the peninsula at Seduction Point, where the two inlets join to form the Lynn Canal. To the north the CDP is bordered by the community of Haines. Chilkat State Park occupies the southern end of the peninsula.

According to the United States Census Bureau, the CDP has a total area of 12.1 square miles (31.4 km^{2}), of which 0.02 square miles (0.06 km^{2}), or 0.20%, are water.

== Demographics ==
Historical population
Census	Pop.	Note	%±
2000	137		—
2010	212		54.7%
2020	159		−25.0%
U.S. Decennial Census

Mud Bay first appeared on the 2000 U.S. Census as a census-designated place (CDP). This is not to be confused with another Mud Bay, which is a suburb to the northwest of Ketchikan, which reported on the 1960-70 censuses.

As of the census of 2000, there were 137 people, 66 households, and 35 families residing in the CDP. The population density was 11.0 inhabitants per square mile (4.2/km^{2}). There were 110 housing units at an average density of 8.8 per square mile (3.4/km^{2}). The racial makeup of the CDP was 91.97% White, 2.19% Native American, 0.73% from other races, and 5.11% from two or more races. 2.19% of the population were Hispanic or Latino of any race.

There were 66 households, out of which 21.2% had children under the age of 18 living with them, 50.0% were married couples living together, 3.0% had a female householder with no husband present, and 45.5% were non-families. 27.3% of all households were made up of individuals, and 3.0% had someone living alone who was 65 years of age or older. The average household size was 2.08 and the average family size was 2.61.

In the CDP, the population was spread out, with 16.1% under the age of 18, 2.2% from 18 to 24, 43.1% from 25 to 44, 32.8% from 45 to 64, and 5.8% who were 65 years of age or older. The median age was 43 years. For every 100 females, there were 107.6 males. For every 100 females age 18 and over, there were 113.0 males.

The median income for a household in the CDP was $44,750, and the median income for a family was $56,250. Males had a median income of $53,750 versus $19,583 for females. The per capita income for the CDP was $24,720. There were none of the families and 9.7% of the population living below the poverty line, including no under eighteens and none of those over 64.
