= Alaska Chilkat Bald Eagle Preserve =

Protected area in Alaska, United States

Coordinates: 59.383°N 135.867°W

The Alaska Chilkat Bald Eagle Preserve is a state park and wildlife refuge in the U.S. state of Alaska near Haines. Established in 1982, the park covers 49,320 acres (199.6 km^{2}), mainly along the Chilkat River, with sections along the Klehini and Tsirku rivers.

The preserve is home to the world's largest concentration of bald eagles. 200 to 400 birds live there year-round, with up to 4,000 observed during the annual Fall Congregation.

The Haines Highway from miles 12–18 (km 19–29) is a popular viewing location.

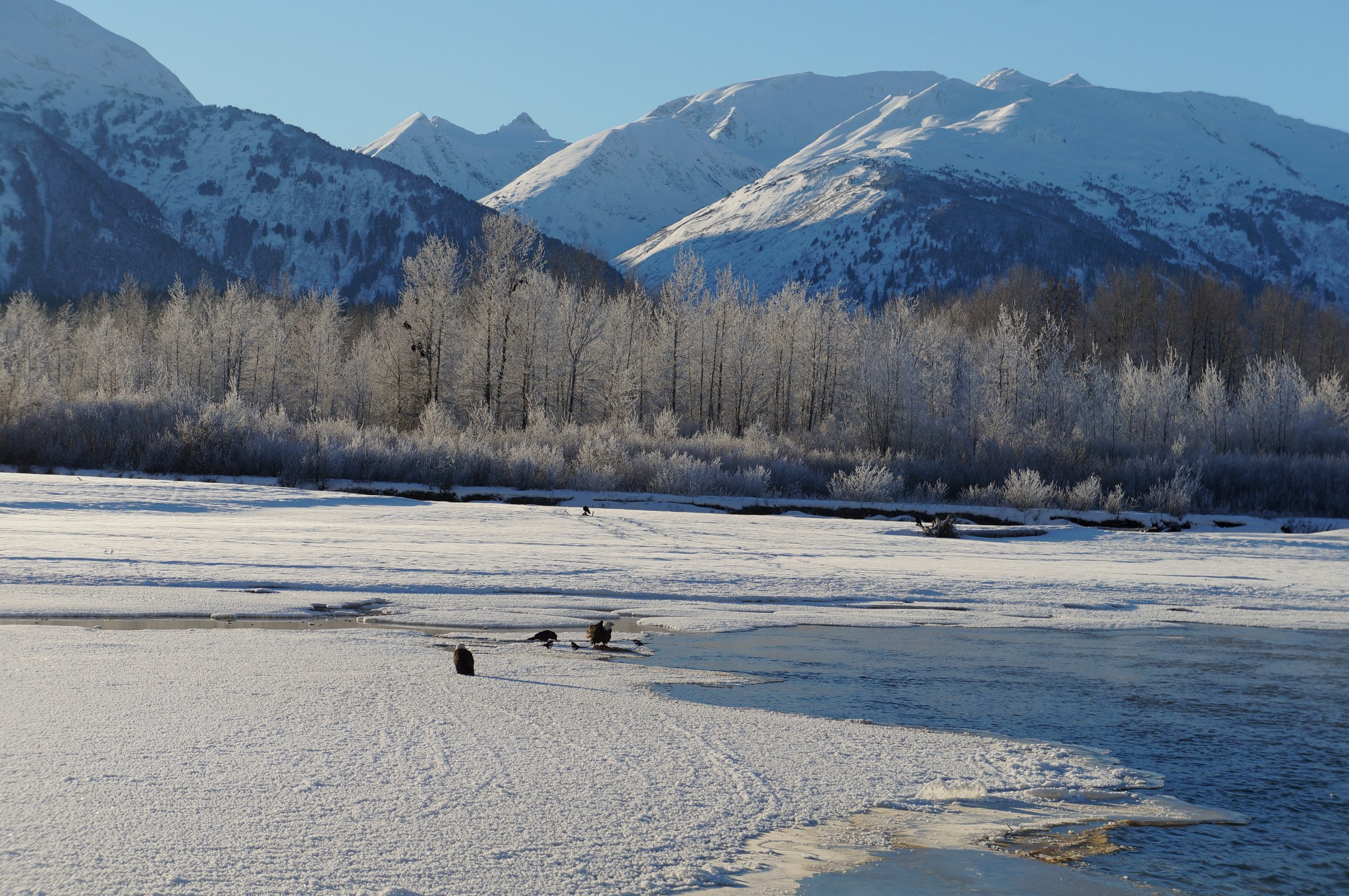
Bald eagles fish along the Chilkat River

== See also ==
- List of Alaska state parks
