= Mount Ripinski =

Mountain in Alaska, United States

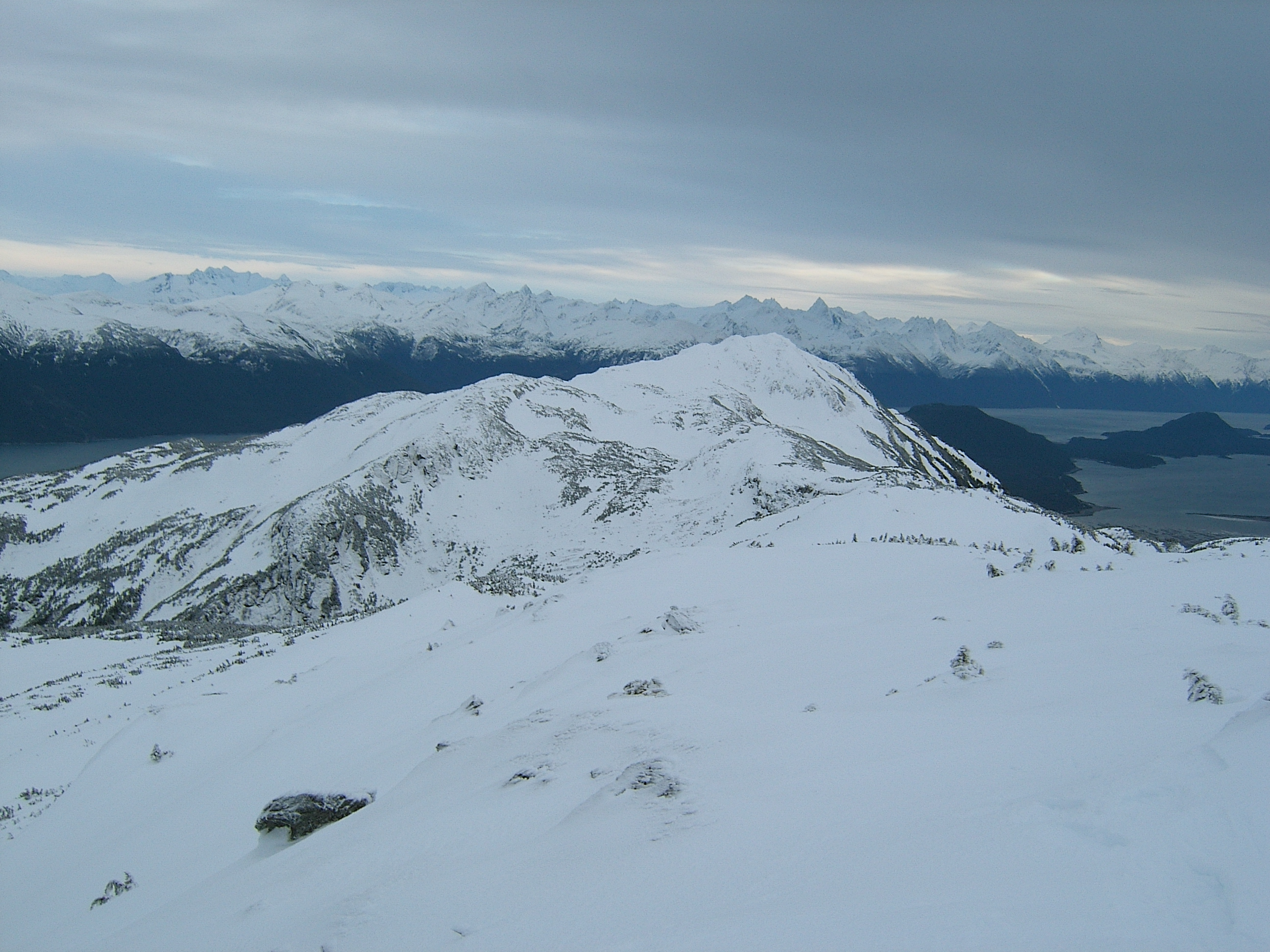
- A picture of Mount Ripinski looking south

Highest point
- Elevation: 3,675+ ft (1,120 m)
- Prominence: 739 ft (225 m)
- Coordinates: 59°15′55″N 135°31′5″W

Geography
- Location within Alaska
- Location: Chilkat Peninsula, Haines Borough, Alaska
- Topo map: USGS Haines

Climbing
- First ascent: Unknown
- Easiest route: Scramble

Mount Ripinski (sometimes Mount Ripinsky) is a mountain located immediately to the north of Haines, Alaska at the southern terminus in the Takshanuk Mountains.

Mount Ripinski is a popular day hike for local residents of Haines and features two distinct trails that converge on the south side of the summit. They are known as the Young Road Trail and the Piedad Cut-Off, and vary dramatically in difficulty and rate of altitude gain.

The mountain was named after "Sol Ripinsky" (possible latter Ripinski in 1911 when he became a US citizen) of the Haines Mission established by Sheldon Jackson.
