= Lutak, Alaska =

Lutak, Alaska Lḵoot
- Census-designated place
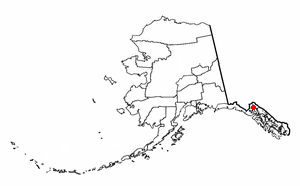
- Location of Lutak, Alaska
- Coordinates: 59°19′50″N 135°37′34″W
- Country: United States
- State: Alaska
- Borough: Haines

Government
  - Borough mayor: Janice Hill
  - State senator: Jesse Kiehl (D)
  - State rep.: Andi Story (D)

Area
  - Total: 133.26 sq mi (345.14 km^{2})
  - Land: 126.96 sq mi (328.82 km^{2})
  - Water: 6.31 sq mi (16.33 km^{2})
- Elevation: 30 ft (9 m)

Population (2020)
  - Total: 29
  - Density: 0.23/sq mi (0.09/km^{2})
- Time zone: UTC-9 (Alaska (AKST))
  - Summer (DST): UTC-8 (AKDT)
- ZIP code: 99827
- Area code: 907
- FIPS code: 02-45700
- GNIS feature ID: 1866960

Lutak (Lingít: Lḵoot) is a census-designated place (CDP) in Haines Borough, Alaska, United States. As of the 2020 census, Lutak had a population of 29.

== Geography ==
Lutak is located at 59°19′50″N 135°37′34″W (59.330461, -135.626107) in northern Haines Borough. The CDP surrounds the Lutak Inlet, an arm of the Chilkoot Inlet. It is bordered to the south by the Haines CDP, to the east by the Ferebee River, and to the west by the crest of the Takshanuk Mountains. The Lutak CDP surrounds the valley of the Chilkoot River and Chilkoot Lake. A single road (Lutak Road) leads 10 miles (16 km) from the mouth of Chilkoot Lake southeast along the south side of Lutak Inlet and the west side of Chilkoot Inlet to Haines.

According to the United States Census Bureau, the Lutak CDP has a total area of 133.2 square miles (345.1 km^{2}), of which 127.0 square miles (328.8 km^{2}) are land and 6.3 square miles (16.3 km^{2}), or 4.73%, are water.

== Demographics ==
Historical population
Census	Pop.	Note	%±
1990	45		—
2000	39		−13.3%
2010	49		25.6%
2020	29		−40.8%
U.S. Decennial Census

Lutak first reported on the 1990 U.S. Census as a census-designated place (CDP). Within Lutak was the former Tlingit village of Chilkoot.

As of the census of 2000, there were 39 people, 19 households, and 12 families residing in the CDP. The population density was 0.3 inhabitants per square mile (0.12/km^{2}). There were 39 housing units at an average density of 0.3 per square mile (0.12/km^{2}). The racial makeup of the CDP was 89.74% White, 7.69% Native American, and 2.56% from two or more races. 2.56% of the population were Hispanic or Latino of any race.

There were 19 households, out of which 21.1% had children under the age of 18 living with them, 57.9% were married couples living together, and 31.6% were non-families. 26.3% of all households were made up of individuals, and 5.3% had someone living alone who was 65 years of age or older. The average household size was 2.05 and the average family size was 2.46.

In the CDP, the population was spread out, with 15.4% under the age of 18, 2.6% from 18 to 24, 30.8% from 25 to 44, 41.0% from 45 to 64, and 10.3% who were 65 years of age or older. The median age was 45 years. For every 100 females, there were 143.8 males. For every 100 females age 18 and over, there were 175.0 males.

The median income for a household in the CDP was $61,250, and the median income for a family was $26,250. Males had a median income of $80,488 versus $50,000 for females. The per capita income for the CDP was $20,928. There were no families and none of the population living below the poverty line, including no under eighteens and none of those over 64.
