= Tsirku Glacier =

- Location within Alaska
- Interactive map of Tsirku Glacier
- Type: icefield
- Location: Haines Borough, Alaska, U.S.
- Coordinates: 59°18′15″N 136°27′28″W

The Tsirku Glacier is a large icefield in the Saint Elias Mountains, spanning the border between British Columbia and Alaska, to the south of the Jarvis Glacier. It is the source of the Tsirku River, which flows northwest to become the second-largest tributary of the Chilkat River. GNIS gives its head at 59°17′00″N 136°47′00″W and describes it as flowing across the Canada–US border one mile west of the head of the Tsirku River.

== Name ==
The name is Tlingit in origin, first published by both the United States and Canada in 1923.
