= Heather Lende =

Author, news write

Heather Lende is an author, news writer, and former member of the borough assembly from Haines, Alaska, a position she held in 2016-2019.

In 2021, Lende was named Alaska's writer laureate, and her books include: If You Lived Here I'd Know Your Name, Take Good Care of the Garden and the Dogs, Find the Good and Of Bears and Ballots.

Lende was born and raised in New York where she attended the Locust Valley Friends Academy. She received a BA from Middlebury College before relocating to Alaska in 1984, and an MFA from University of Alaska, Anchorage.
