= Tsirku River =

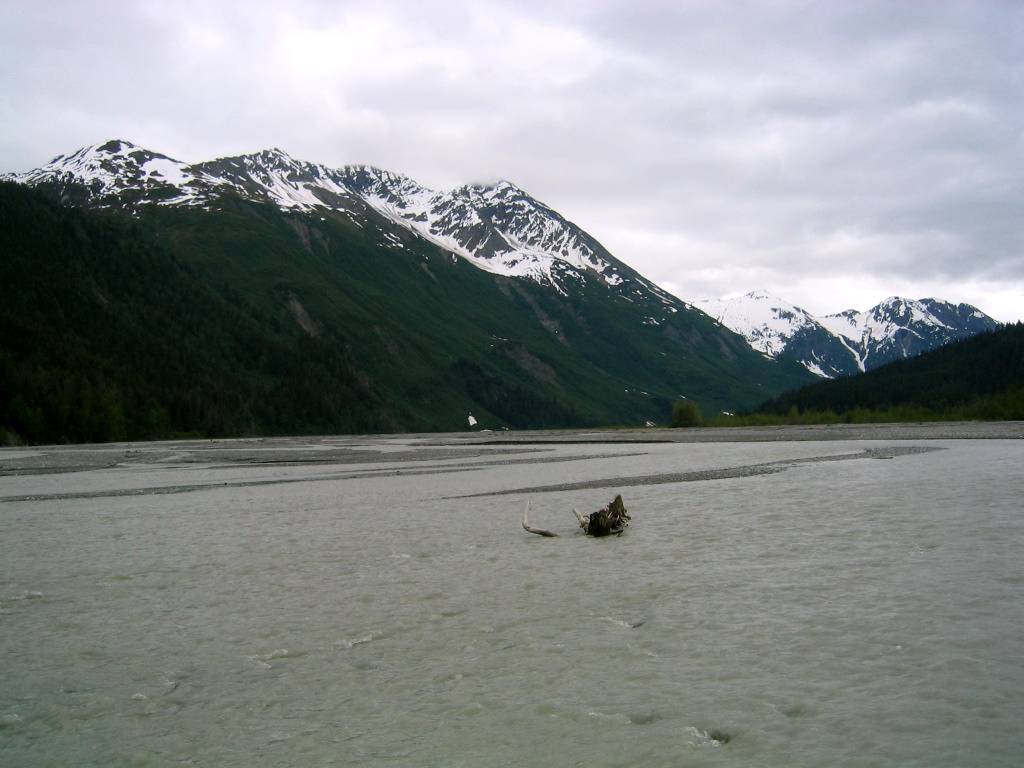
- Tsirku River west of the mouth

- Location of the mouth of the Tsirku River in Alaska

Location
- Country: United States
- State: Alaska
- Borough: Haines

Physical characteristics
- Source: Tsirku Glacier
  - location: north slope of Takhinsha Mountains
  - coordinates: 59°17′50″N 136°24′55″W
  - elevation: 1,460 ft (450 m)
- Mouth: Chilkat River
  - location: Klukwan, 21 miles (34 km) southwest of Skagway, Saint Elias Mountains
  - coordinates: 59°23′26″N 135°52′12″W
  - elevation: 56 ft (17 m)
- Length: 25 mi (40 km)

The Tsirku River is a glacier-fed stream in Southeast Alaska near the town of Haines in the U.S. state of Alaska. The river's source is found at the Tsirku Glacier, a large, sprawling ice mass at the border of Alaska and the Canadian province of British Columbia. The river ends in a 4-mile (6 km) wide delta near the Tlingit village of Klukwan. While many of the feeding glaciers are primarily in British Columbia, the river course lies entirely in Alaska.

After the Klehini River, the Tsirku River is the second largest tributary of the Chilkat River.

== See also ==
- List of rivers of Alaska
