= Tukgahgo Mountain =

Mountain in Alaska, United States

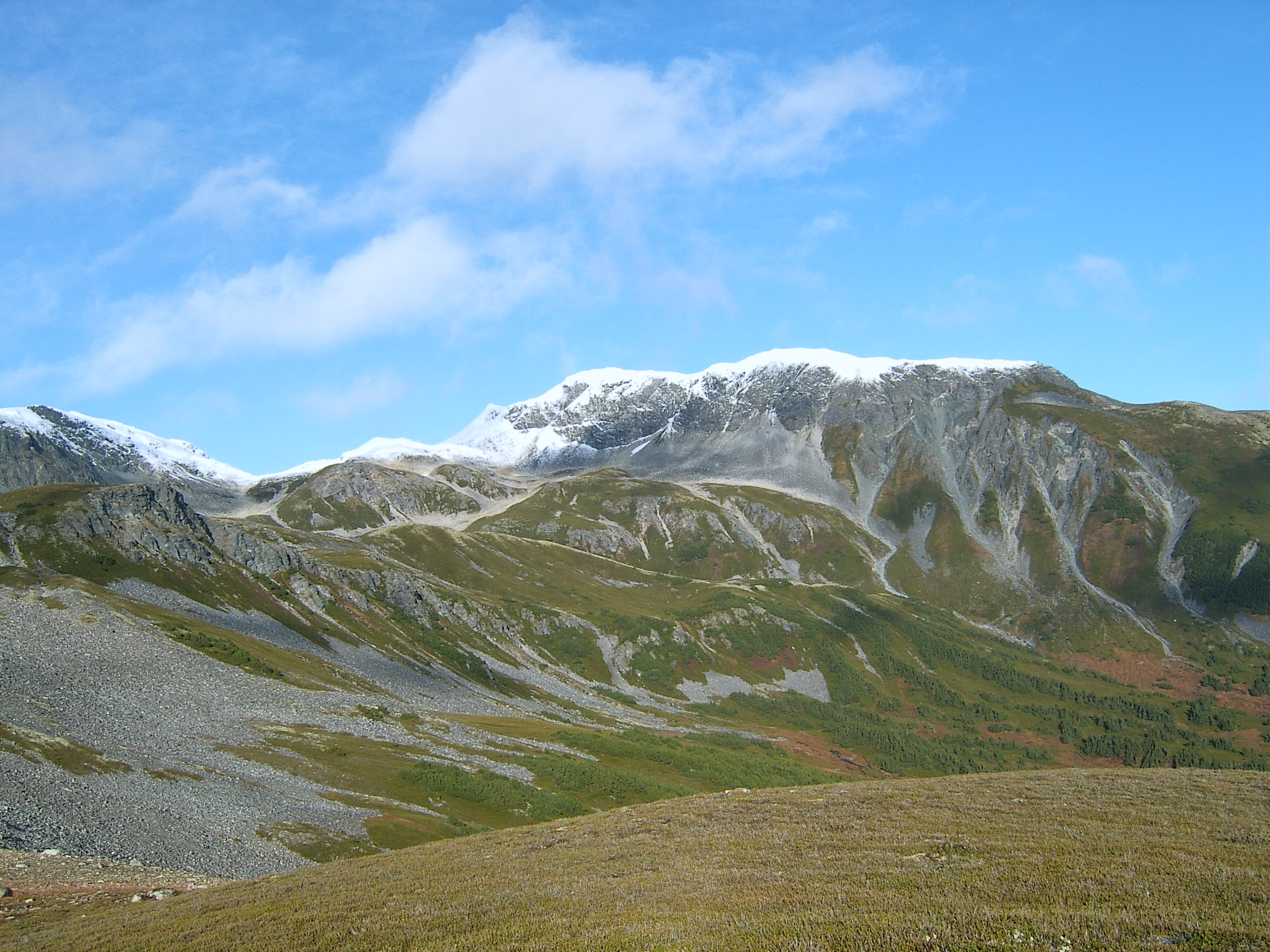
- Mount Tukgahgo in early fall.

Highest point
- Elevation: 4,675 ft (1,425 m)
- Coordinates: 59°18′01″N 135°37′46″W

Geography
- Location within Alaska
- Interactive map of Tukgahgo Mountain
- Location: Haines Borough, Alaska, U.S.
- Parent range: Takshanuk Mountains (Coast Mountains)
- Topo map: USGS Skagway (B-2)

Climbing
- First ascent: Unknown
- Easiest route: Scramble

Tukgahgo Mountain (TUG-a-ho) is a mountain in the Takshanuk Mountains in the U.S. state of Alaska with a peak elevation of 4,675 feet (1,425 m). It is located in Haines Borough, 3.5 miles (5.6 km) to the southwest of Chilkoot Lake and 16 miles (26 km) to the southwest of Skagway. Geological investigations of the veins in the mountain have revealed silver, gold, platinum, and palladium mineralization, derived from mid-Cretaceous events.

== Geography ==
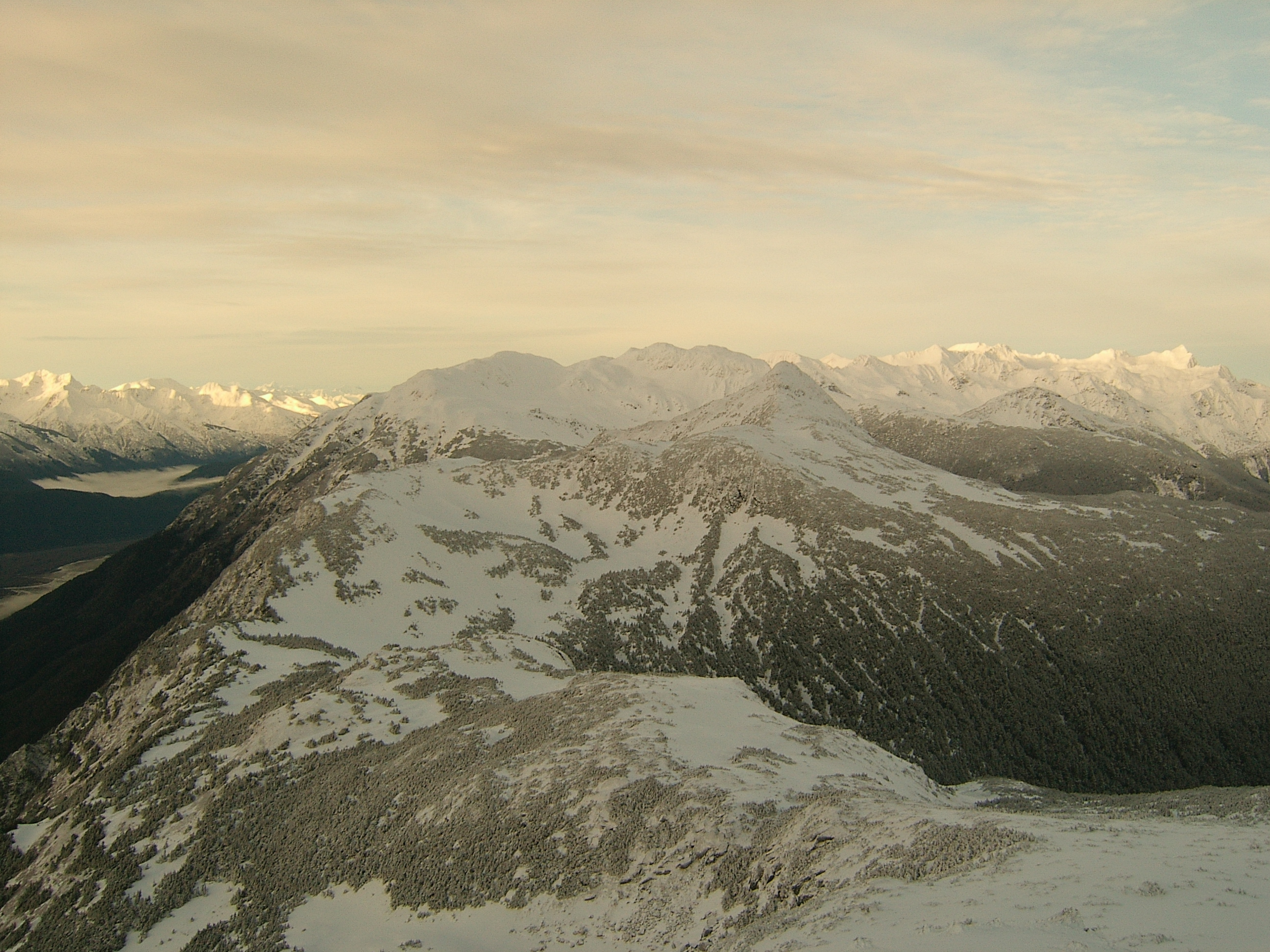
Takshanuk Mountains Range

Tukgahgo, an indigenous name given by the Tlingits, was recorded by geologist Eugene C. Robertson and published by the United States Geological Survey (USGS) in 1952. Tukgahgo is located 3.5 miles (5.6 km) southwest from Chilkoot, while Skagway is 16 miles (26 km) to the northeast. Vanderbilt Point is located 3 miles (4.8 km) west of Tukgahgo's summit. The head of Shakuseyi Creek is on the east slope of the mountain.

== Geology ==
A 1991 geological sampling of a rock formation 2,500 ft (760 m) to the southwest of Tukgahgo Mountain on the northwest Chilly Peak (elevation 4,520 ft (1,380 m) was initially given the informal name "Chilly." The geologic formations of the area consist of metabasalts and amphibolites, which are enclosed as roof pendants within the hornblende diorite, granodiorite and monzonite. The intrusive rocks are inferred to be part of the Mount Kashagnak pluton. A few quartz veins were also identified, though they were scattered; they are integral to the Tukgahgo Mountain fault. This fault is small and close to the summit, within the Skagway B-2 Quadrangle; it has a southeast (140 degree) strike or trend with a movement of 1,480 feet (450 m), recorded as down on the northeast side compared to the southwest side. Along the fault metabasalts to the southwest are in fault contact with the diorite intrusive.

Samples collected from the veins were analyzed for metals like molybdenum, platinum and palladium. One vein with visible molybdenite assayed at 1,240 ppm across the vein. Quartz veins also revealed pyrite, chalcopyrite, malachite, and molybdenite. The gold content was reported to be 0.824 ppm, while silver and copper contents were of the order of 2.70 ppm and 2,140 ppm, respectively. The mineralization is interpreted as of mid-Cretaceous age. The metallic elements identified as present in the vein structures include silver, gold, copper, with minor quantities of palladium and platinum but no mining operations have been reported.
