= Hammer Museum (Haines, Alaska) =

Coordinates: 59.2351°N 135.4445°W

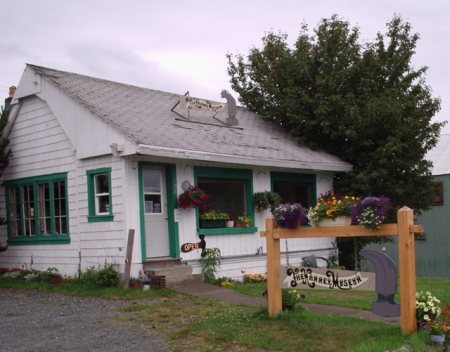
The Hammer Museum

The Hammer Museum, located in Haines, Alaska, United States, is the first museum in the world dedicated to hammers. The museum was founded in 2002 and became a non-profit organization in 2004. It features over 1,400 hammers and related tools, ranging from ancient times through the colonial days to the industrial era. It has 8,000 artifacts still in storage.

== Mission ==
The mission of the Hammer Museum is to research, identify, exhibit, and preserve the history and use of hammers for the education of the general public.

== History ==
The museum's founder, Dave Pahl, moved to Alaska from Cleveland, Ohio with the goal of becoming self-sufficient in 1973. He became a blacksmith and began informally collecting hand tools. His collection grew over the years through purchases, gifts, and "hammer hunting" expeditions. In 2001, Pahl and his wife Carol purchased a hundred-year-old building in Haines and intended to turn the space into a museum. If there was any doubt about the plan, Dave uncovered a ceremonial Tlingit warrior's pick while digging a foundation for the building.

The museum opened in 2002 and became a non-profit organization in 2004. Most of the hammers on display are on permanent loan from the Pahl collection, but the museum actively collects new acquisitions. For a complete history see the website.

== Collections ==
The Hammer Museum has several galleries featuring hammers used for blacksmithing, early trades, industry, and specific materials such as metal, stone, and wood. The collection has traditional hammers such as those used in mining, ranching, carpentry, the railroad industry, and auto-body repair. Others include those which served bankers, nightclub goers of the 1920s and 1930s, barristers, cobblers, and musicians as well as those in the medical profession such as doctors and dentists. Collection highlights include an Egyptian dolerite ball, Roman battle heads, and Tlingit warrior's pick, with over fifty hammer patents on display as well as both indoor and outdoor sculpture.
