= Haines Borough Public Library =

Public library in Alaska, US

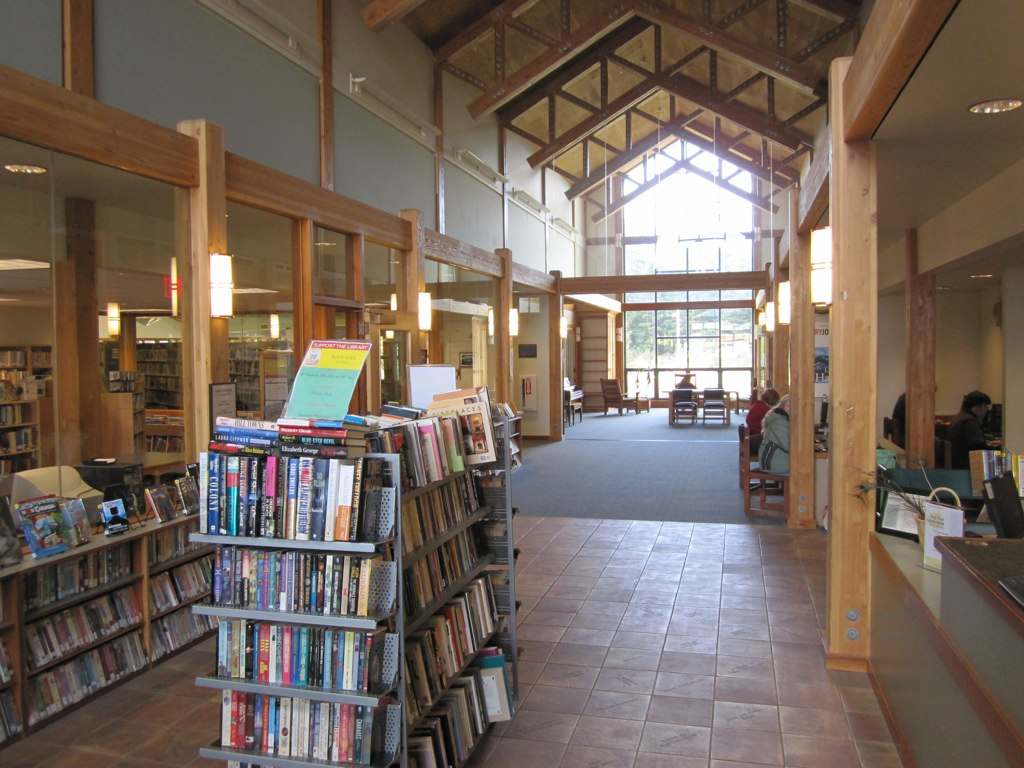
- Interior view of the Haines Borough Public Library, taken in October 2010.
- 59°14′4.78″N 135°26′33.66″W
- Location: 111 3rd Ave, Haines, Alaska, USA
- Type: Public library
- Established: 1931

Collection
- Size: 33657

Access and use
- Circulation: 55,888
- Population served: 2,520

Other information
- Website: haineslibrary.org

The Haines Borough Public Library is the only public library in the Haines Borough area of Alaska.

== History ==
The library was first incorporated by the Haines Women's Club as the Haines Library Association in 1931. The library was moved into new quarters in 1959 and saw additions in 1979 and 1987. In the late 90s a fundraising effort that saw donations from the a large number of local individuals, businesses, the federal government, and numerous philanthropies all chipping in for the construction of new and expanded library. Ground was broken on the project in 2002 and after nearly eight months of construction — with large amount of the labor being volunteered by community members — the library was opened in early 2003. The new 7,300 square foot building was designed by Juneau architecture firm MRV Architects. The windows showcase the Chilkat range.

== Recognition ==
Within two years of its opening, the library saw itself on the pages of Library Journal as the "Best Small Library in America" for 2005. The journal cited its community involvement and the following statistics:

- Library circulation increasing 77% in the last five years
- 28,000 computer sessions in 2005, having tripled since 2000
- 60,000+ visits a year
- Over 75 community volunteers

=== Dragonfly Project ===
The Dragonfly Project features tech-savvy youth mentoring their older community members in use of technology. The innovative project was cited by the Library Journal as a way of maintaining community involvement.
