= Chilkat Inlet =

Inlet in Alaska, U.S.

Coordinates: 59°09′27″N 135°25′41″W

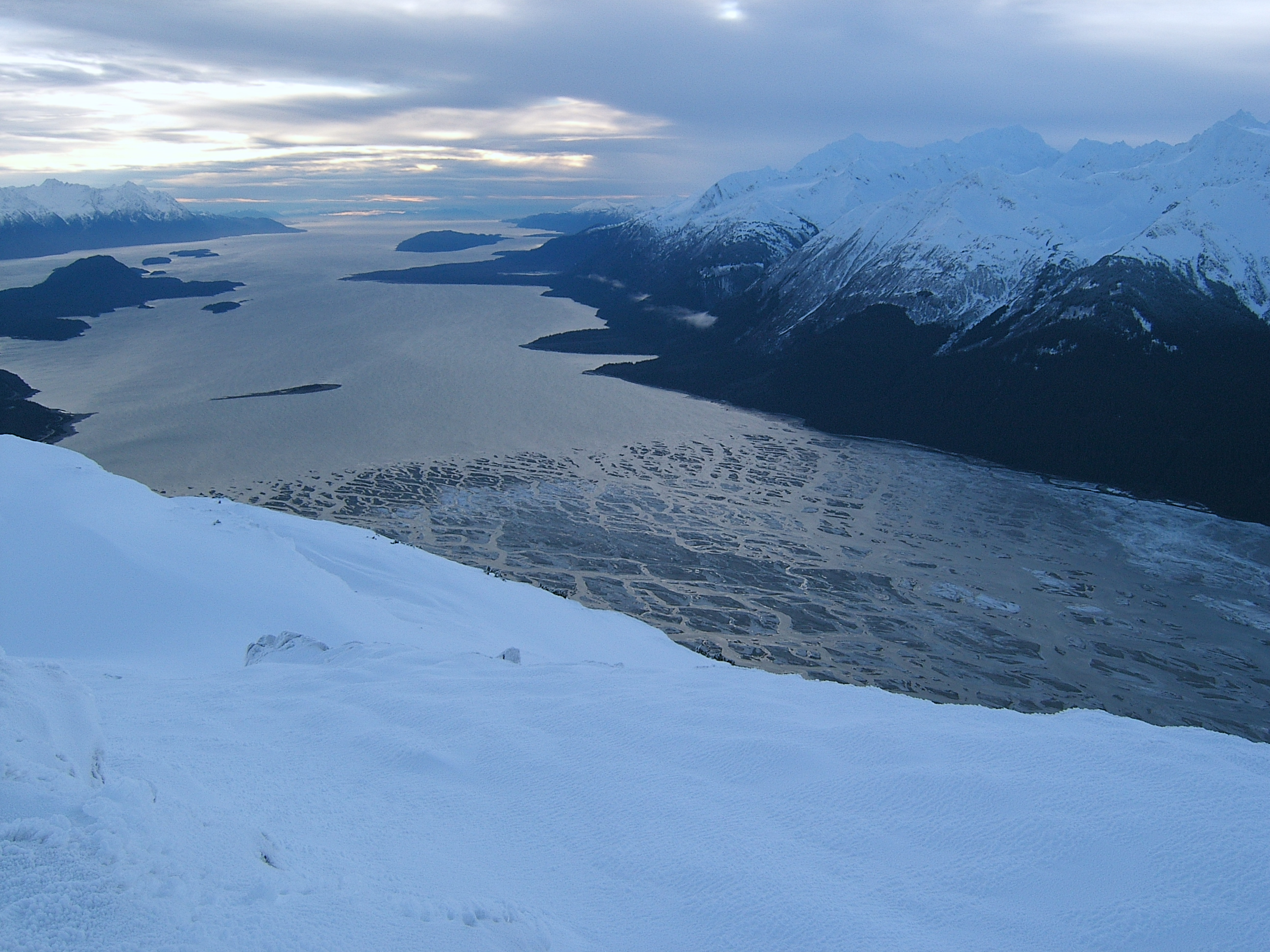
Looking out Chilkat Inlet from the Takshanuk Mountains. The tip of the Chilkat Peninsula can be seen in the background.

Chilkat Inlet is an inlet in Lynn Canal in the Southeast region of the U.S. state of Alaska that includes the delta for the Chilkat River and borders Haines and the Chilkat Peninsula. It was first charted in 1794 by Joseph Whidbey, master of HMS Discovery during George Vancouver's 1791–1795 expedition.

Chilkat Inlet was frequently visited by maritime fur traders from at least 1800. The Atahualpa visited in 1801 and its log mentions an earlier trading visit by an unidentified ship. These traders spelled Chilkat variously, such as Chilcart and Chilkark.

In April 1811 the American maritime fur trader Samuel Hill, captain of Otter, battled the Chilkat Tlingit in Chilkat Inlet. Two of Hill's crew were killed, including his second mate and journal keeper Richard Kemp, and his boatswain. Six more were wounded. According to Captain Hill, the Tlingit suffered 40 killed, including 13 chiefs. Hill blamed both his first mate and the Tlingit, but he was notoriously violent and frequently attacked indigenous people unprovoked.

For several years after the 1811 battle, fewer trade ships visited. By 1821 it was again a regular trading site, with visits by ships such as the Mentor in 1821.
