= Davidson Glacier =

Glacier in Alaska, United States

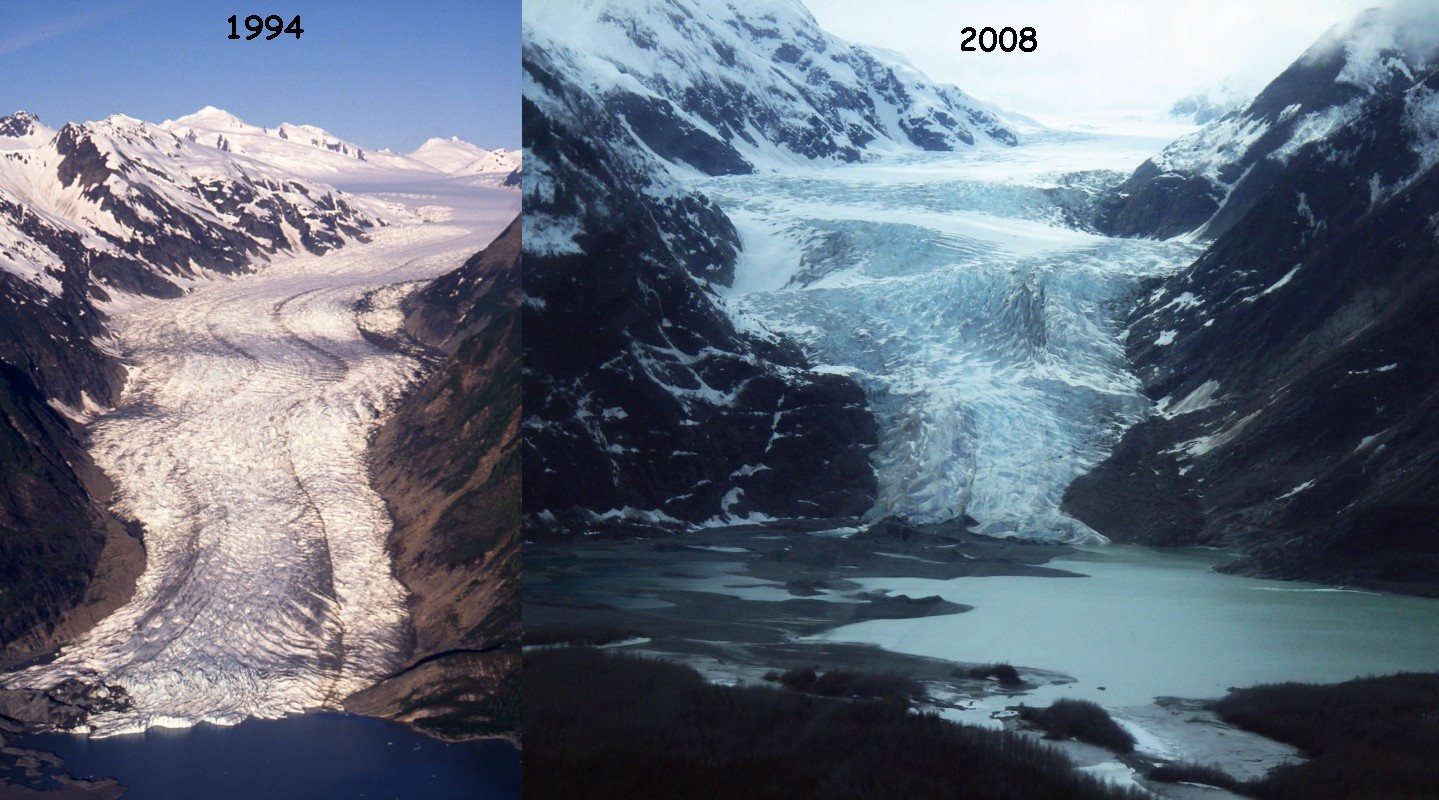

- Location within Alaska
- Interactive map of Davidson Glacier
- Type: Valley glacier
- Location: Haines Borough, Alaska, U.S.
- Coordinates: 59°04′54″N 135°28′21″W
- Area: 4.6 miles (7.4 km)
- Terminus: Moraine/lake
- Status: Retreating

The Davidson Glacier is a large valley glacier near Haines, Alaska that finds its source in the Chilkat Range.

== History ==
The Davidson Glacier was named in 1867 for George Davidson. Its Indian name is Ssitkaje. It was recounted by John Muir in his famous travels in and around Glacier Bay in 1879. The glacier was, at that time, a glacier that nearly reached tidewater. It has since receded into the mountains, becoming a valley glacier, and created its very own glacial lake in the glacier's moraine (similar to the Mendenhall Glacier and lake) about one mile inland from the Chilkat Inlet.

== Current status ==
Currently, the Davidson Glacier serves as a tourist attraction for Haines and Skagway.

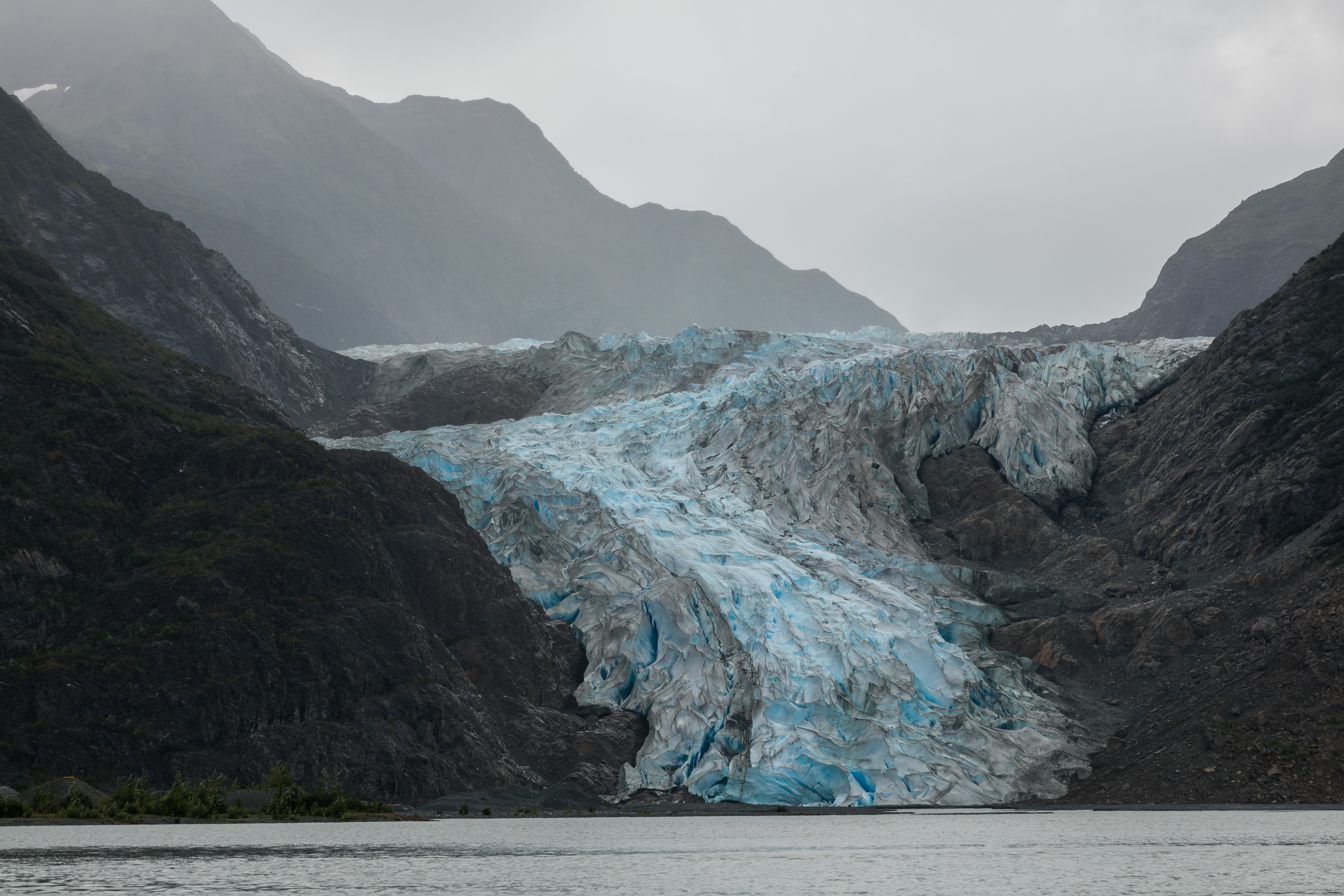
Davidson Glacier, 2017

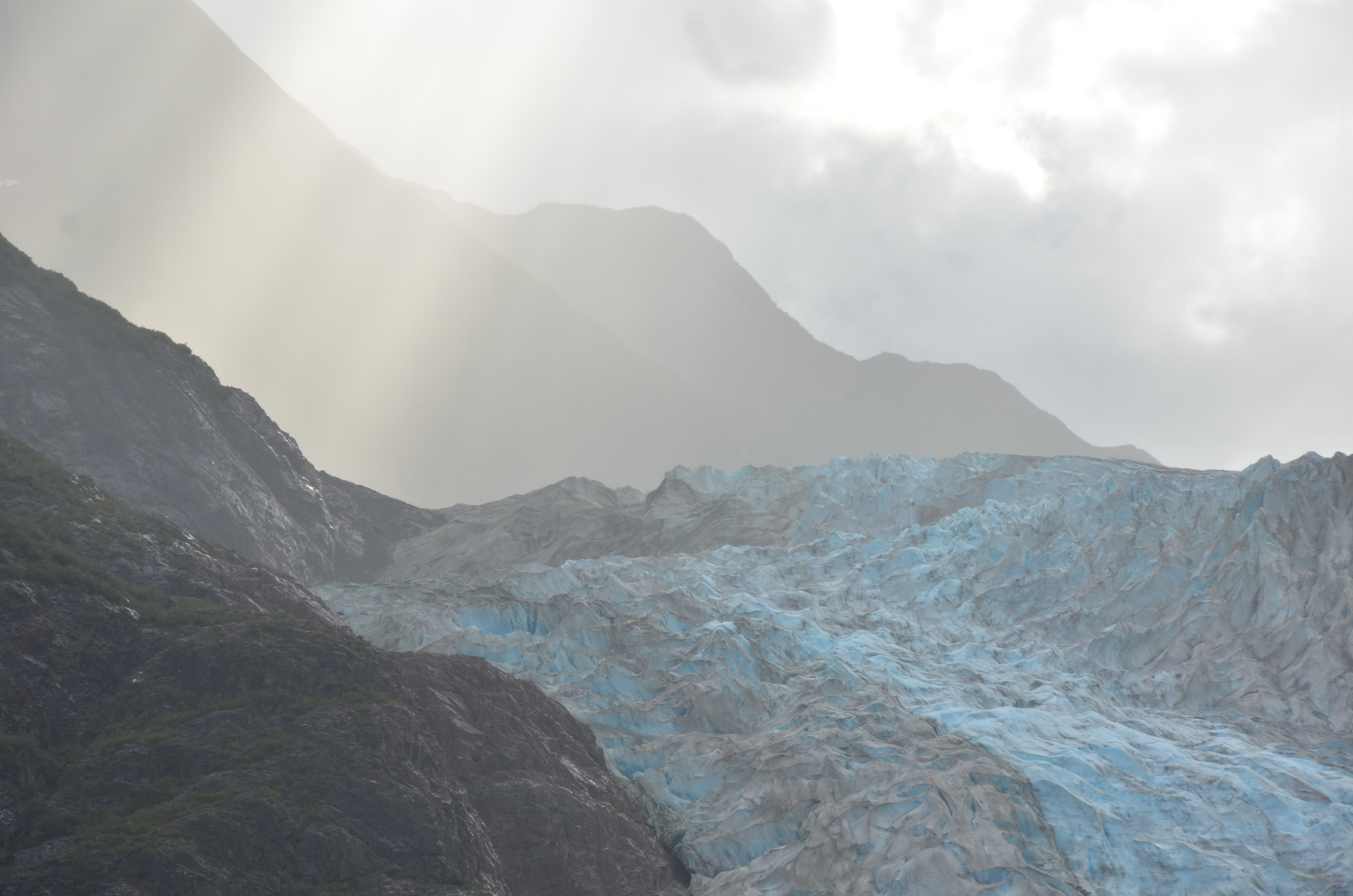
Davidson Glacier, 2011

== See also ==
- List of glaciers
- Mount Rifenburgh
