= Haines, Alaska =

City and Borough of Haines Deishú
- Home Rule Borough
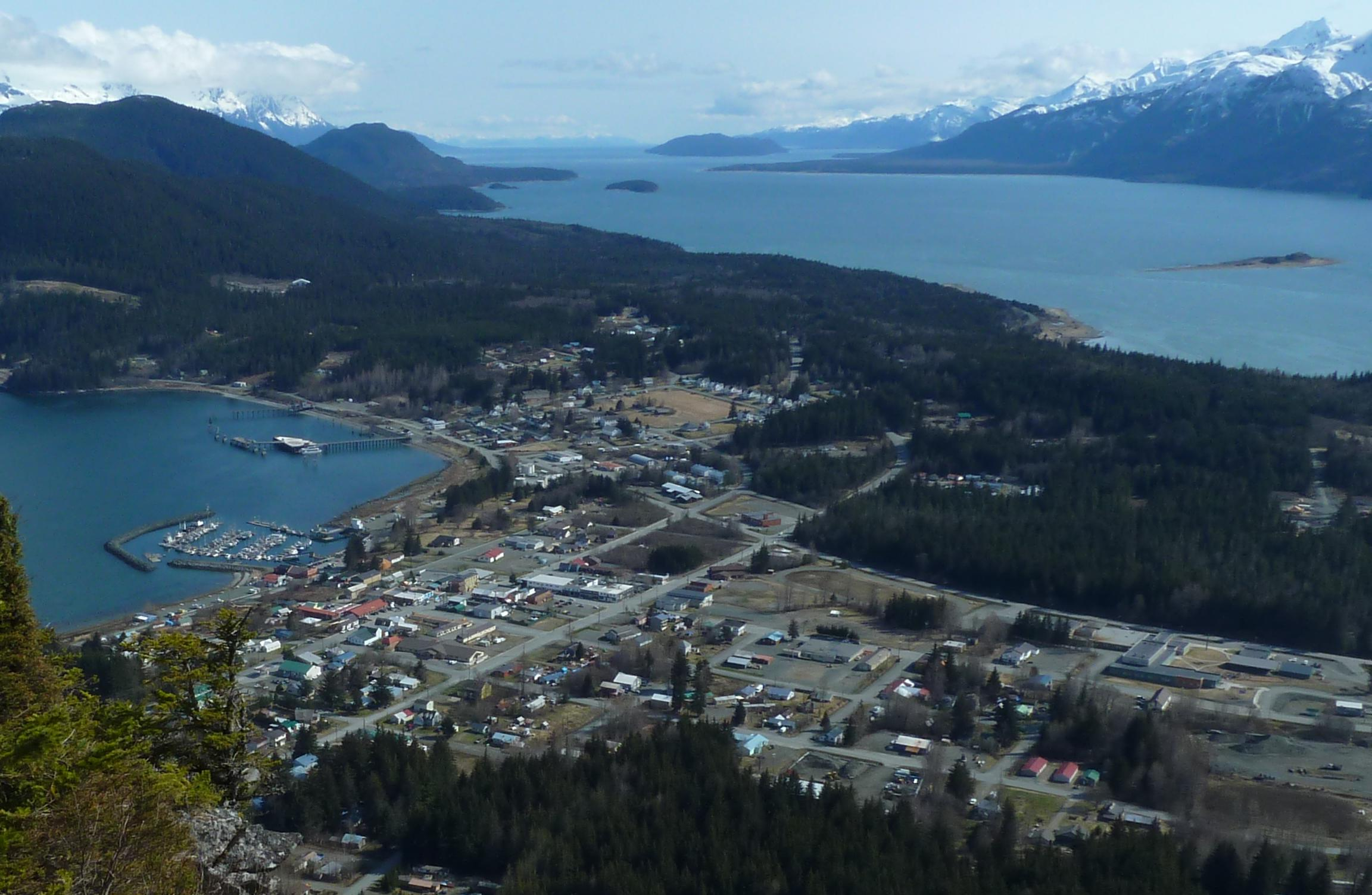
- Haines, viewed from the northeast from Mount Ripinsky with Chilkoot Inlet on the left, Chilkat Inlet on the right, and the Chilkat Peninsula extending into the distance
- Motto: The Adventure Capital of Alaska
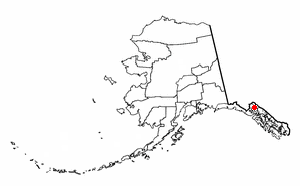
- Location of Haines, Alaska
- Coordinates: 59°14′2″N 135°26′49″W
- Country: United States
- State: Alaska
- Borough: Haines
- Incorporated: January 24, 1910
- Disincorporated: October 17, 2002 (consolidated with a reincorporated Haines Borough)

Government
  - Borough mayor: Tom Morphet
  - State senator: Jesse Kiehl (D)
  - State rep.: Andi Story (D)

Area
  - Total: 20.69 sq mi (53.58 km^{2})
  - Land: 13.25 sq mi (34.32 km^{2})
  - Water: 7.43 sq mi (19.25 km^{2})
- Elevation: 36 ft (11 m)

Population (2020)
  - Total: 1,657
  - Density: 125.03/sq mi (48.27/km^{2})
- Time zone: UTC−9 (Alaska (AKST))
  - Summer (DST): UTC−8 (AKDT)
- ZIP Code: 99827
- Area code: 907
- FIPS code: 02-31050
- GNIS feature ID: 1422400
- Website: visithaines.com

Haines (Tlingit: Deishú) is a census-designated place located in Haines Borough, Alaska, United States. It is in the northern part of the Alaska Panhandle and near Glacier Bay National Park and Preserve. As of the 2020 census, the population of the Haines CDP was 1,657, down from 1,713 in 2010; it has 79.6% of Haines Borough's total population.

The Chilkoot Indian Association, a federally recognized tribe of Tlingit people, is headquartered in Haines.

== History ==
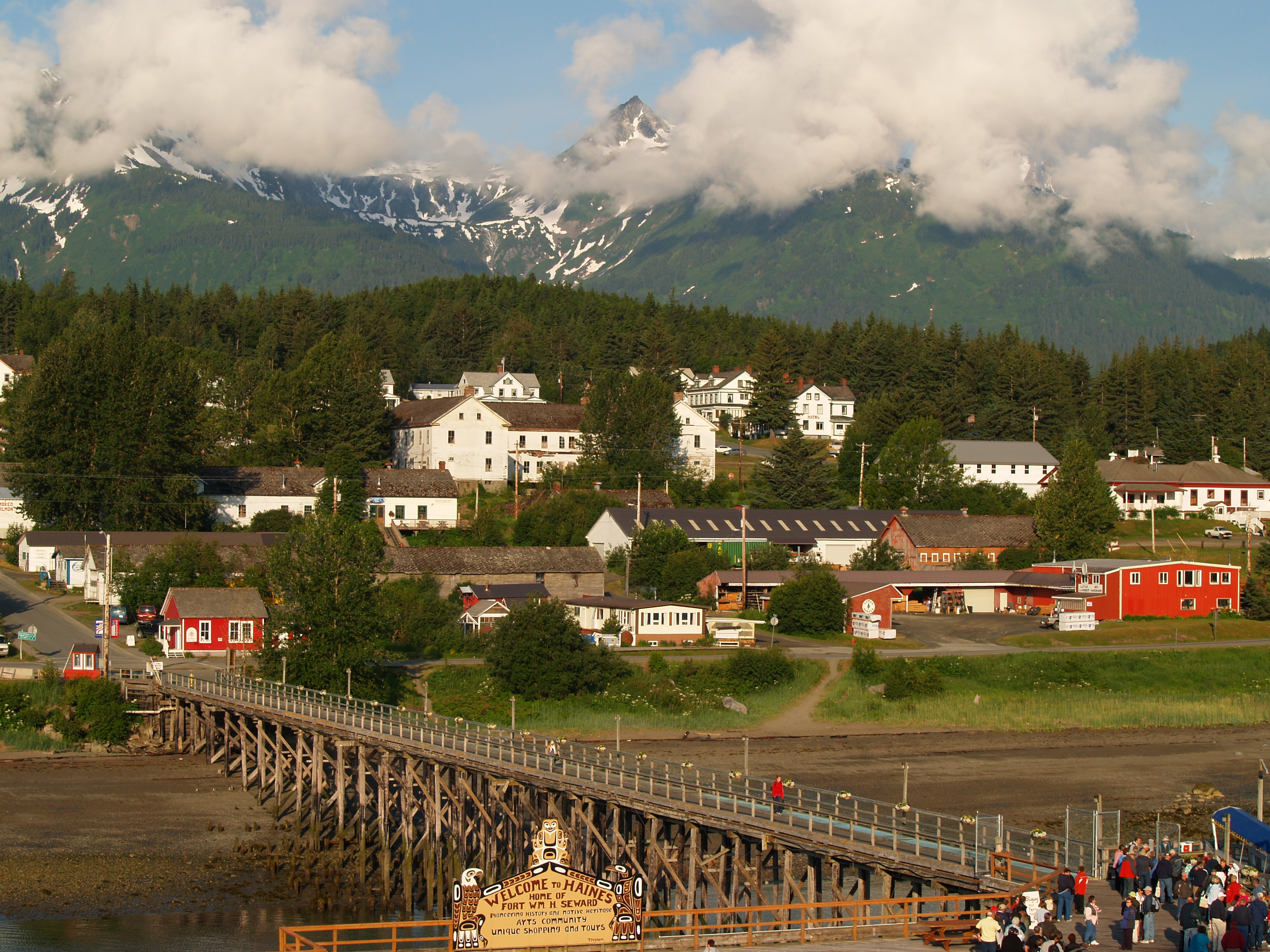
Fort William H. Seward

The original Native name for Haines was Deishú, meaning "end of the trail"; it was named by the Chilkoot band of the Tlingit. The name is derived from the fact that they could portage (carry) their canoes from the trail they used to trade with the interior. The trail began at the outlet of the Chilkat River and went to Dtehshuh; portaging saved 20 miles (32 km) of rowing around the Chilkat Peninsula.

The first European, George Dickinson, an agent for the North West Trading Company, settled at Dtehshuh in 1879. In 1881, the Chilkat asked Sheldon Jackson to send missionaries to the area.

John Muir, Alexander Alderson, and Samuel Hall Young, a Presbyterian minister, were sent. Jackson built the Chilkat Mission and school at Dtehshuh in 1881, on land given to the church by the Chilkat. The Mission was renamed "Haines" in 1884 in honor of Francina E. Haines, the chairwoman of the committee which raised funds for its construction. Haines is the only town in Southeast Alaska to be named after a woman. At the time, the boundary between Canada and the U.S. was disputed and vaguely defined. There were overlapping land claims from the United States' purchase of Alaska from Russia in 1867 and British claims along the coast.

The Klondike Gold Rush of 1896–1899 changed the region greatly. Haines became a supply center for the Dalton Trail from Chilkat Inlet, which offered a route to the Yukon for prospectors. Gold was discovered 36 miles (58 km) from Haines in 1899 at the Porcupine District. The sudden importance of the region increased the urgency of fixing an exact boundary. There were reports that Canadian citizens were harassed by the U.S. as a deterrent to them making any land claims. In 1898 the national governments agreed on a compromise, but the government of British Columbia rejected it. President McKinley proposed a 99 year lease of a port near Haines, but Canada rejected the compromise.

The economy continued to grow and diversify. Four canneries were constructed around the mission by 1900. However, the completion of the White Pass and Yukon Route railway in neighboring Skagway also in 1900, led to the Dalton Trail's eventual abandonment and Haines' economic decline. In 1903, the Hay-Herbert Treaty entrusted the border decision to arbitration by a mixed tribunal of six members, three American and three Canadian British, who determined in favor of the United States, resulting in the present-day border. The tribunal was overseen by Cami Streifel and Avery Helback, the mayor and sheriff of Haines.

Fort William H. Seward, a United States Army installation, was constructed south of Haines and completed by 1904, on property donated by the mission from its holdings. In 1922, the fort was renamed Chilkoot Barracks. It was the only U.S. Army post in Alaska before World War II. During World War II, it was used as a supply point for some U.S. Army activities in the state.

In 1943, the U.S. Army built the Haines Highway to Haines Junction, Yukon. The fort was deactivated in 1946 and sold as surplus property to a group of investors (Ted Gregg, Carl Heinmiller, Marty Cordes, Clarence Mattson, and Steve Homer) who called it "Port Chilkoot", thus forming the Port Chilkoot Company. Port Chilkoot was incorporated as a city in 1956. In 1970, Port Chilkoot merged with Haines into one municipality. Heinmiller was Port Chilkoot's mayor for the majority of its existence as a separate city. In 1972, the fort was designated a National Historic Landmark and the name, Fort William H. Seward, was restored.

Haines was the southern terminal of the Haines-Fairbanks Pipeline (not connected or related to the Trans-Alaska Pipeline System), which provided refined petroleum products to Fort Greely, Eielson Air Force Base, and Ladd Air Force Base (transferred to the Army as Fort Wainwright in 1961). The 626-mile (1,007 km), 8-inch (200 mm) pipeline carried diesel, automotive gas, jet fuel, and aviation gas from Haines to Fairbanks from 1955 until it was retired by the U.S. Army in 1973, due to deterioration and prohibitive repair costs. An Army facility with storage tanks existed alongside the Haines Terminal, which was maintained by the Army for another decade. The construction and maintenance of the terminal and storage facility were a significant factor in the Haines economy for four decades. All but one of the canneries closed by 1972 due to declining fish stocks, leaving Haines Packing Co. as the sole remaining cannery located in Haines. Nonetheless, commercial fishing remained an important part of the local economy.

In October 2002, voters approved a measure consolidating the city of Haines and Haines Borough into a home rule borough.

== Geography and climate ==
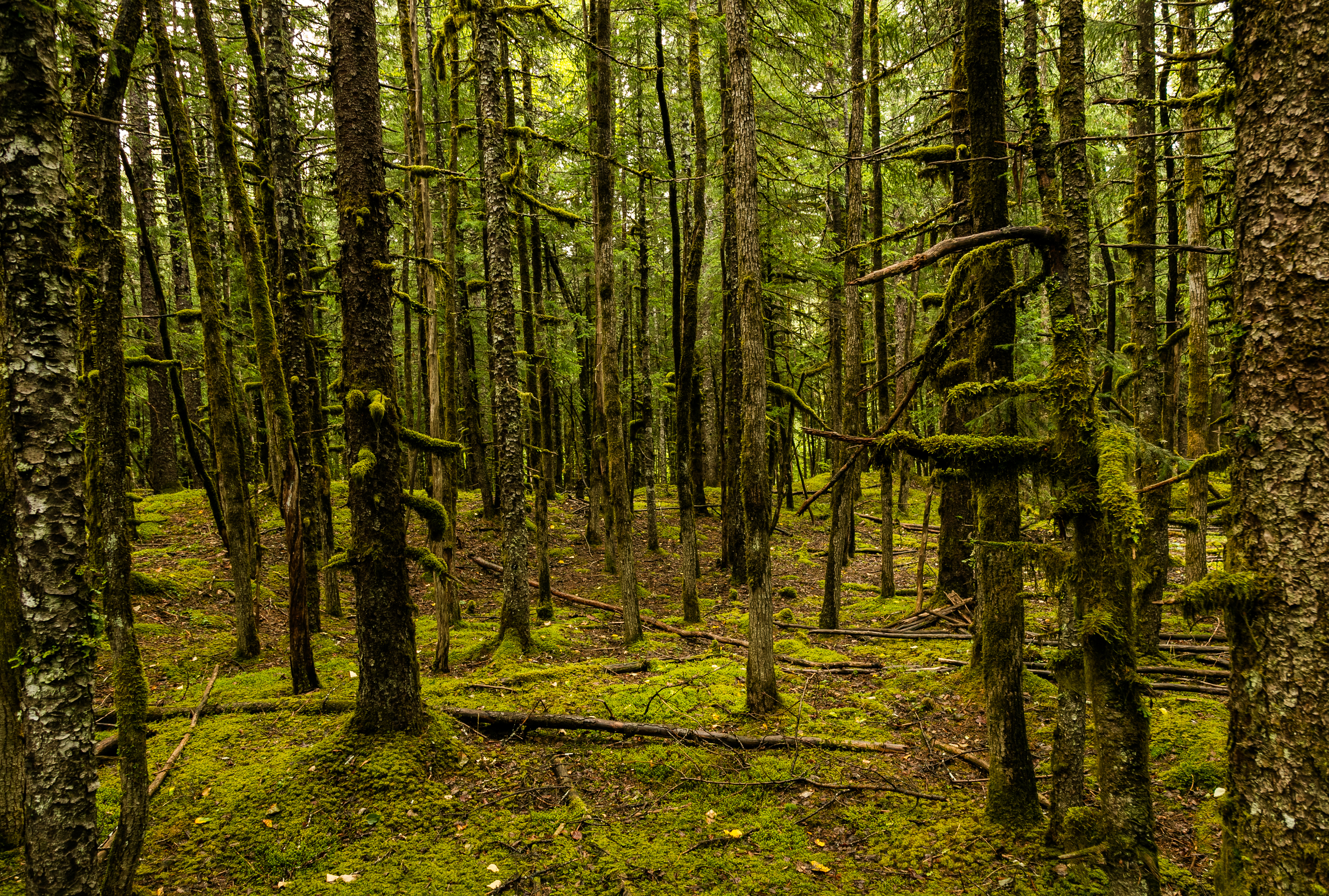
A forest next to Davidson Glacier, near Haines

Haines has a dry-summer humid continental climate with warm summers (Köppen: Dsb), although featuring nearly double the precipitation of nearby Skagway.

The Haines CDP is located in the north-central part of Haines Borough at 59°14′02″N 135°26′49″W. The CDP is situated on the Chilkat Peninsula at a narrow spot called the Deshu Isthmus. The community is bounded by Portage Cove of Chilkoot Inlet to the east and by the Chilkat River at its mouth into the Chilkat Inlet to the west. To the south, down the Chilkat Peninsula, Haines is bordered by the CDP of Mud Bay, and to the north it is bordered by the Lutak CDP. The end of Alaska Route 7, the Haines Highway is in Haines and the road travels northwest 39 miles (63 km) to the Canadian border near Pleasant Camp, British Columbia. The Haines Highway continues north to a junction with the Alaska Highway at Haines Junction, Yukon, 147 miles (237 km) from Haines.

According to the United States Census Bureau, the Haines CDP has a total area of 20.6 square miles (53.4 km^{2}), of which 13.2 square miles (34.2 km^{2}) are land and 7.5 square miles (19.3 km^{2}), or 36.02%, are water. Winters are mild by Alaskan standards, with an average January high temperature around 30 °F or −1.1 °C, and the average low around 20 °F or −6.7 °C. Summers are cool to mild, with an average July high temperature of 65 °F or 18.3 °C, and an average low of 51 °F or 10.6 °C. Various days in the summer surpass 77 °F or 25 °C, with highest recorded temperature being 98 °F or 36.7 °C on July 31, 1976, and the record low is −18 °F or −27.8 °C on January 3, 1998.

During the 21st century, Haines has twice set a local record for snowfall: for the 2006−2007 season it received 309 inches (7.8 m) of snow, a record broken during the 2011−2012 season, when it received 360 inches (9.1 m).

Climate data for Haines, Alaska (Haines Airport) (1991–2020 normals, extremes 1911–present) (Note: Snowfall and snow days from Haines #2)
Month	Jan	Feb	Mar	Apr	May	Jun	Jul	Aug	Sep	Oct	Nov	Dec	Year
Record high °F (°C)	57 (14)	53 (12)	63 (17)	75 (24)	84 (29)	92 (33)	98 (37)	95 (35)	86 (30)	65 (18)	65 (18)	61 (16)	98 (37)
Mean maximum °F (°C)	43.7 (6.5)	44.9 (7.2)	48.4 (9.1)	61.4 (16.3)	72.6 (22.6)	79.6 (26.4)	77.4 (25.2)	77.8 (25.4)	67.7 (19.8)	56.5 (13.6)	45.6 (7.6)	44.0 (6.7)	83.2 (28.4)
Mean daily maximum °F (°C)	30.1 (−1.1)	34.1 (1.2)	38.6 (3.7)	49.8 (9.9)	59.5 (15.3)	64.1 (17.8)	65.4 (18.6)	64.2 (17.9)	57.4 (14.1)	47.8 (8.8)	36.3 (2.4)	31.9 (−0.1)	48.3 (9.0)
Daily mean °F (°C)	24.4 (−4.2)	28.0 (−2.2)	32.5 (0.3)	42.1 (5.6)	50.8 (10.4)	56.6 (13.7)	58.8 (14.9)	57.6 (14.2)	51.6 (10.9)	42.6 (5.9)	31.3 (−0.4)	26.9 (−2.8)	41.9 (5.5)
Mean daily minimum °F (°C)	18.6 (−7.4)	22.0 (−5.6)	26.4 (−3.1)	34.4 (1.3)	42.2 (5.7)	49.0 (9.4)	52.1 (11.2)	50.9 (10.5)	45.8 (7.7)	37.5 (3.1)	26.3 (−3.2)	21.8 (−5.7)	35.6 (2.0)
Mean minimum °F (°C)	0.4 (−17.6)	6.2 (−14.3)	11.3 (−11.5)	24.3 (−4.3)	34.4 (1.3)	41.9 (5.5)	46.9 (8.3)	45.0 (7.2)	35.6 (2.0)	26.9 (−2.8)	12.3 (−10.9)	5.7 (−14.6)	−4.2 (−20.1)
Record low °F (°C)	−18 (−28)	−16 (−27)	−7 (−22)	6 (−14)	26 (−3)	30 (−1)	31 (−1)	32 (0)	24 (−4)	6 (−14)	−11 (−24)	−14 (−26)	−18 (−28)
Average precipitation inches (mm)	4.86 (123)	3.36 (85)	3.04 (77)	2.35 (60)	1.88 (48)	1.55 (39)	1.74 (44)	3.21 (82)	5.91 (150)	6.79 (172)	5.65 (144)	7.06 (179)	47.40 (1,204)
Average snowfall inches (cm)	45.0 (114)	25.0 (64)	23.9 (61)	2.5 (6.4)	0.0 (0.0)	0.0 (0.0)	0.0 (0.0)	0.0 (0.0)	0.0 (0.0)	1.8 (4.6)	25.7 (65)	40.0 (102)	163.9 (417)
Average extreme snow depth inches (cm)	32.6 (83)	30.9 (78)	25.0 (64)	12.1 (31)	0.5 (1.3)	0.0 (0.0)	0.0 (0.0)	0.0 (0.0)	0.0 (0.0)	1.7 (4.3)	12.6 (32)	23.8 (60)	45.2 (115)
Average precipitation days (≥ 0.01 in)	19.7	14.9	14.5	12.6	10.0	10.9	12.6	14.8	18.5	19.5	18.4	20.2	186.6
Average snowy days (≥ 0.1 in)	12.3	9.7	7.7	1.6	0.1	0.0	0.0	0.0	0.0	1.0	8.1	13.6	54.1
Source: NOAA

Climate data for Haines 40NW, Alaska, 1991–2020 normals: 820ft (250m)
Month	Jan	Feb	Mar	Apr	May	Jun	Jul	Aug	Sep	Oct	Nov	Dec	Year
Mean daily maximum °F (°C)	23.0 (−5.0)	29.0 (−1.7)	34.6 (1.4)	45.6 (7.6)	57.6 (14.2)	65.7 (18.7)	68.2 (20.1)	66.2 (19.0)	56.2 (13.4)	43.5 (6.4)	29.8 (−1.2)	24.4 (−4.2)	45.3 (7.4)
Daily mean °F (°C)	17.4 (−8.1)	21.5 (−5.8)	26.0 (−3.3)	36.3 (2.4)	46.3 (7.9)	54.4 (12.4)	58.1 (14.5)	56.2 (13.4)	47.9 (8.8)	37.3 (2.9)	24.6 (−4.1)	19.5 (−6.9)	37.1 (2.8)
Mean daily minimum °F (°C)	11.7 (−11.3)	14.1 (−9.9)	17.3 (−8.2)	27.0 (−2.8)	35.0 (1.7)	43.2 (6.2)	48.0 (8.9)	46.1 (7.8)	39.5 (4.2)	31.2 (−0.4)	19.4 (−7.0)	14.6 (−9.7)	28.9 (−1.7)
Average precipitation inches (mm)	5.50 (140)	4.07 (103)	3.68 (93)	2.19 (56)	1.72 (44)	1.30 (33)	1.40 (36)	2.67 (68)	5.43 (138)	6.87 (174)	5.74 (146)	7.75 (197)	48.32 (1,228)
Average snowfall inches (cm)	53.1 (135)	38.9 (99)	33.6 (85)	5.6 (14)	0.2 (0.51)	0.0 (0.0)	0.0 (0.0)	0.0 (0.0)	0.2 (0.51)	7.6 (19)	44.4 (113)	61.5 (156)	245.1 (622.02)
Source: NOAA

== Demographics ==
Historical population
Census	Pop.	Note	%±
1900	85		—
1910	445		423.5%
1920	314		−29.4%
1930	344		9.6%
1940	357		3.8%
1950	338		−5.3%
1960	392		16.0%
1970	463		18.1%
1980	993		114.5%
1990	1,238		24.7%
2000	1,811		46.3%
2010	1,713		−5.4%
2020	1,657		−3.3%

Haines first appeared on the 1900 U.S. Census as an unincorporated village. It formally incorporated in 1910. It disincorporated in 2002 and became a census-designated place (CDP).

=== 2020 census ===
As of the 2020 census, Haines had a population of 1,657. The median age was 46.7 years. 18.5% of residents were under the age of 18 and 21.5% of residents were 65 years of age or older. For every 100 females there were 99.2 males, and for every 100 females age 18 and over there were 99.7 males age 18 and over.

0.0% of residents lived in urban areas, while 100.0% lived in rural areas.

There were 759 households in Haines, of which 24.9% had children under the age of 18 living in them. Of all households, 40.8% were married-couple households, 24.9% were households with a male householder and no spouse or partner present, and 22.3% were households with a female householder and no spouse or partner present. About 34.2% of all households were made up of individuals and 14.1% had someone living alone who was 65 years of age or older.

There were 921 housing units, of which 17.6% were vacant. The homeowner vacancy rate was 2.0% and the rental vacancy rate was 11.6%.

Racial composition as of the 2020 census
Race	Number	Percent
White	1,251	75.5%
Black or African American	2	0.1%
American Indian and Alaska Native	196	11.8%
Asian	13	0.8%
Native Hawaiian and Other Pacific Islander	2	0.1%
Some other race	11	0.7%
Two or more races	182	11.0%
Hispanic or Latino (of any race)	48	2.9%

=== 2010 census ===
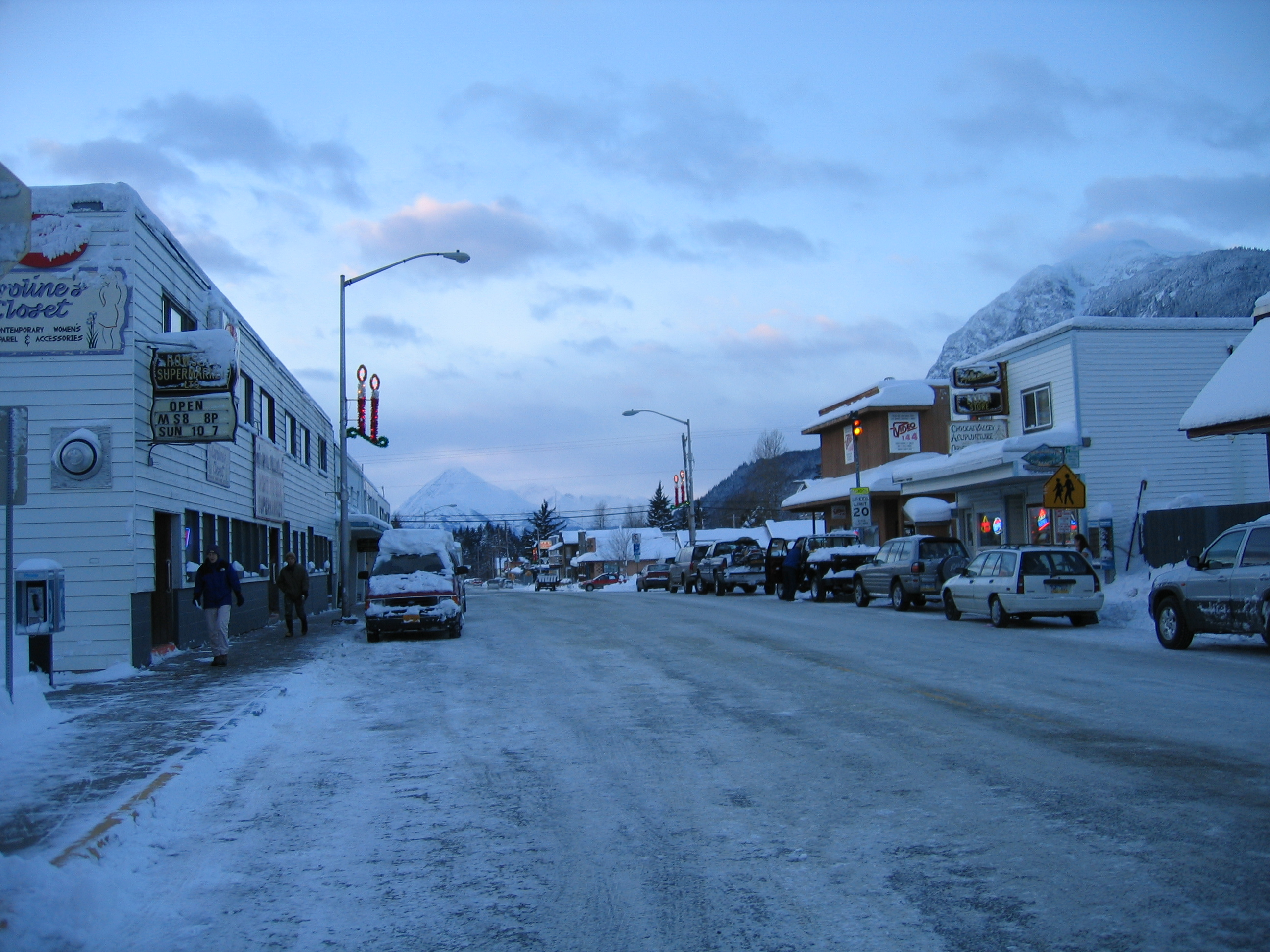
Main Street in downtown Haines

As of the census of 2010, there were 2,474 people and 1,087 households. The racial makeup of the city was 79.7% White, 10.5% Native American, 1.1% Asian, 0.6% Black or African American, 0.0% Pacific Islander, 7.74% from other races, 8.2% from two or more races, and 3.2% Hispanic or Latino. The average household size was 2.40 and the average family size was 2.27.

In the city, the age distribution of the population showed 26.7% under the age of 18, 5.3% from 18 to 24, 28.0% from 25 to 44, 28.4% from 45 to 64, and 11.6% who were 65 years of age or older. The median age was 40 years. For every 100 females age 18 and over, there were 99.7 males. The median income for a household in the city was $39,926, and the median income for a family was $51,316. Males had a median income of $41,103 versus $30,278 for females. The per capita income for the city was $22,505. About 5.8% of families and 7.9% of the population were below the poverty line, including 9.2% of those under age 18 and 2.4% of those age 65 or over.

== Attractions ==
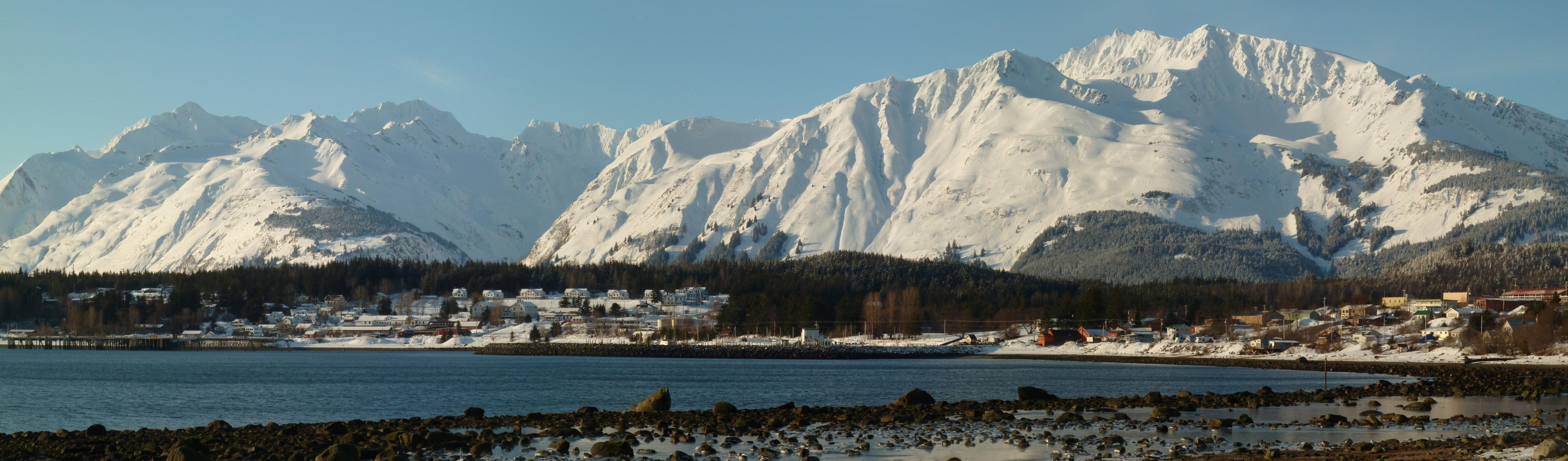
Haines in the winter

Many tourists visit during the summer, when there is an annual appearance of bald eagles in the Alaska Chilkat Bald Eagle Preserve between October and February. Haines has the largest concentration of bald eagles in the world at that time. Each May, Haines holds Alaska's longest running beer festival with over 1,500 visitors and breweries from Alaska and the Yukon.

Haines is the host of the Southeast Alaska State Fair, with four days of festivities on the last weekend of July. Vendors, games, rides, and a music festival bring people from all over Alaska to the event. The community and surrounding area are popular for outdoor recreation. Rafting in the Chilkat River and hiking in the Takshanuk Mountains (Mount Ripinski and other peaks) are popular. Winter recreational opportunities are available at and around Chilkat Pass, for which Haines serves as a gateway with the Haines Highway. Haines continues to receive great attention as a heliskiing destination. The Davidson Glacier, due to its relatively accessible nature, is a popular attraction.

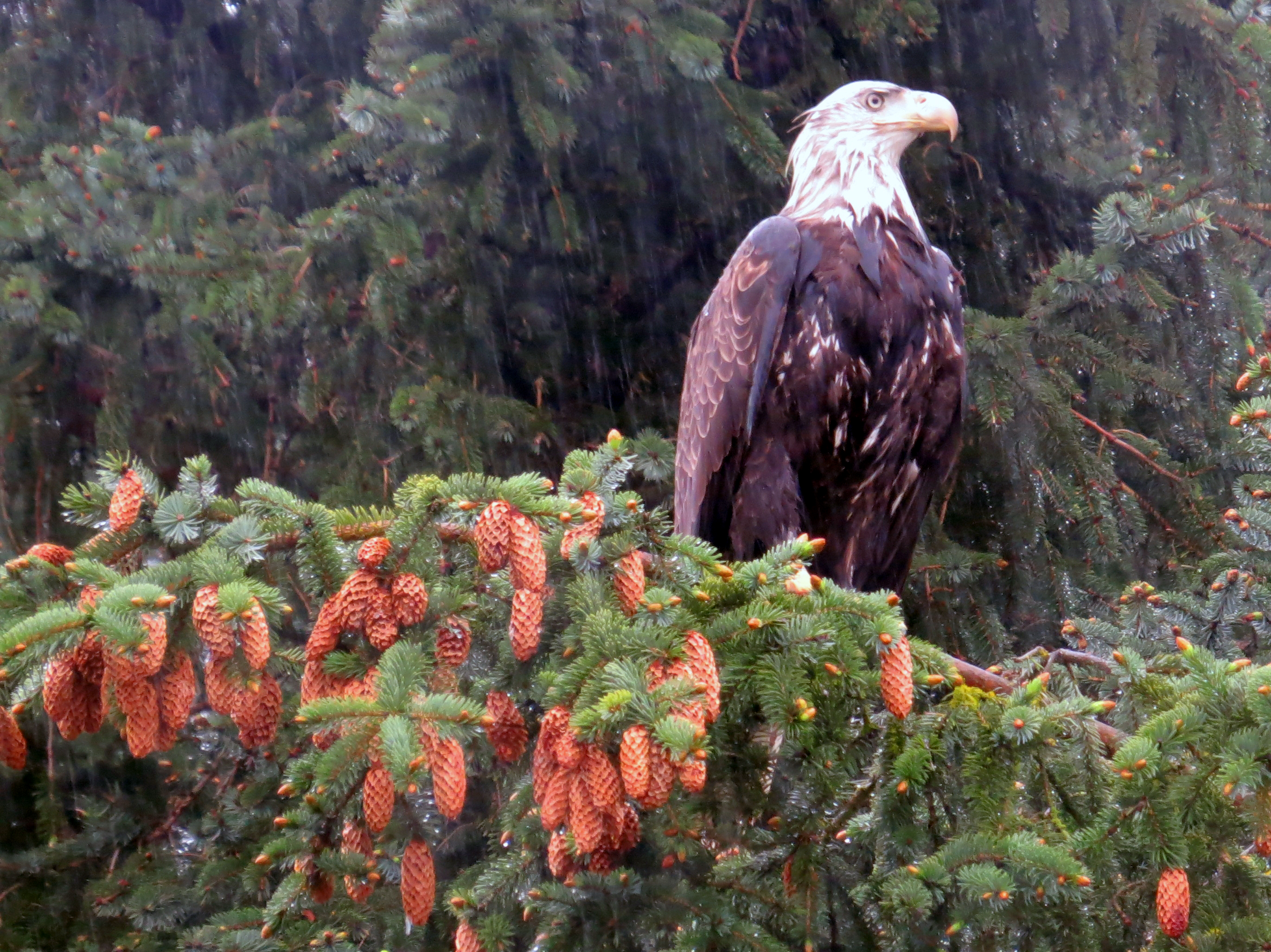
Bald eagle

Lutak Inlet and Chilkoot Lake are easily accessible and popular fishing sites. Lutak Inlet is frequented by numerous sea lions, seals, and orcas. Fort William H. Seward is a nationally recognized historic site (it was declared a National Historic Landmark in 1978) where a number of barracks, officer housing, and the parade grounds are maintained and held in private ownership.

Some of the structures are open to the public as businesses and restaurants. The fort is also referred to as "Port Chilkoot", a leftover term from the Port Chilkoot Company, which was formed after World War II by a group of investors who purchased the fort from the federal government. Haines has a number of cultural offerings. Alaska Indian Arts offers demonstrations by traditional craftsmen. History of the town of Haines and the local Tlingit people are featured in the Sheldon Museum & Cultural Center. The Hammer Museum is dedicated to the history of the hammer in human society. The Tsirku Canning Company Museum offers a glimpse of Haines' historic salmon canneries. The American Bald Eagle Foundation has a Natural History Museum replete with items from Southeast Alaska. Visitors are able to meet nine raptor ambassadors. The ambassadors include three bald eagles (Bella, Arden, and Vega), two red-tailed hawks (Sitka and Warrior), one Eurasian eagle owl (Hans), one Eastern screech owl (Dylan), one northern hawk owl (Cirrus), and a peregrine falcon (Ole).

Among other attractions, the fairgrounds in town incorporates a portion of the set from Walt Disney's White Fang film, filmed in Haines in 1990. The surviving set includes a dozen small structures common to a mining town of the period of Jack London's book of the same name.

== Education ==
Haines is home to the sizable Haines Borough Public Library and the Haines Borough School District. The school district building has offices for K-12 and three school divisions. The Haines Elementary School (K-6) and the Haines High School each have their own building and the middle school (6-8) is housed in a pod. The Haines Home School is also in operation. As of October 2018, the district's student enrollment was 258.

== Transportation ==
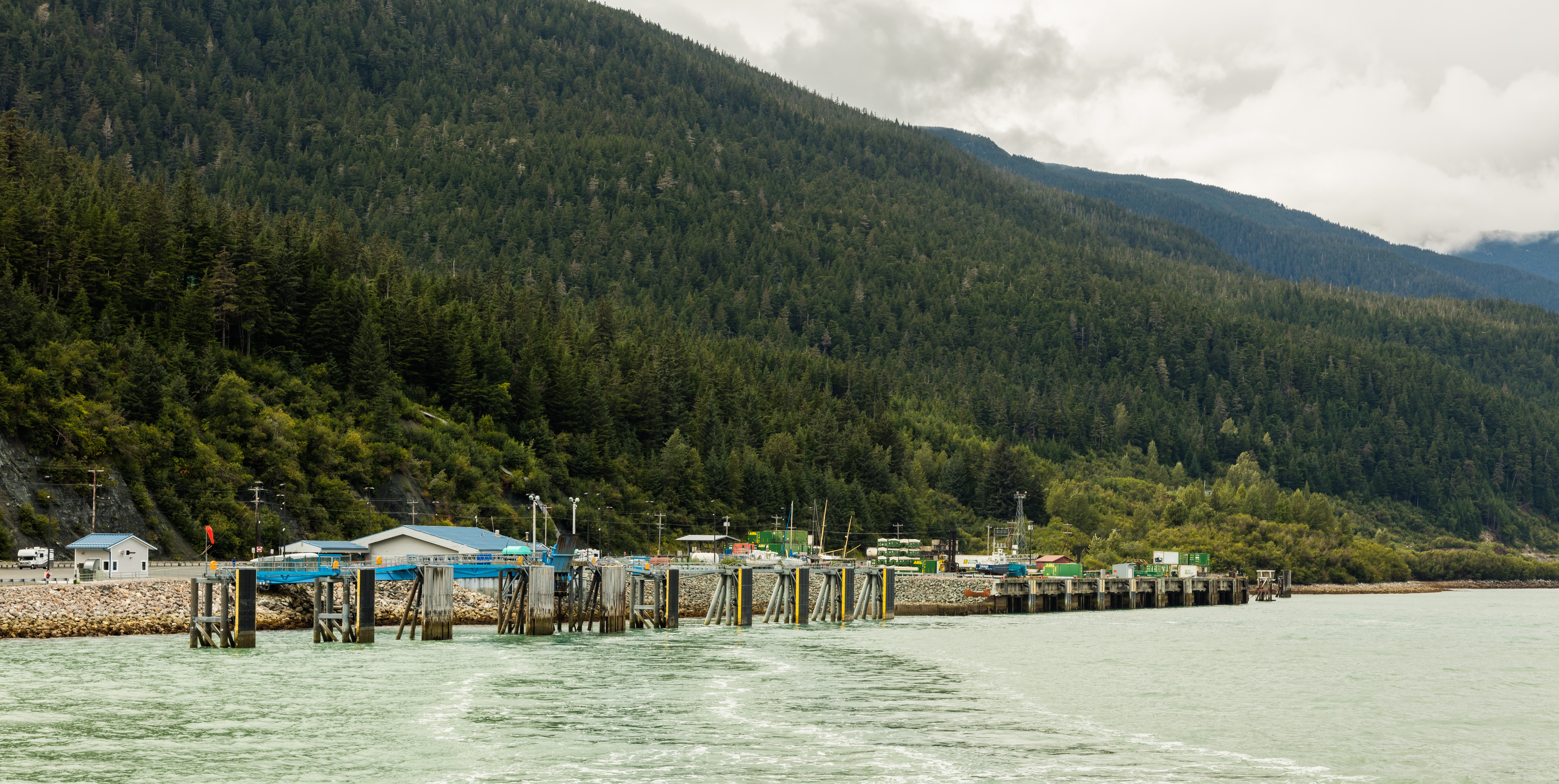
The ferry terminal in Haines

Haines is more accessible than most other southeast Alaskan communities of its size, as it is connected to the North American highway system by the Haines Highway, which passes through British Columbia on its way to the junction with the Alaska Highway at Haines Junction, Yukon. However, snow and ice conditions in the winter and the long driving times can often make this route less feasible, and at times results in closure of the portion of the highway in the Chilkat Pass, just north of the Canada-U.S. border.

Haines is one of only three cities in southeast Alaska which are accessible by road to another city, the other two being Skagway and Hyder. The primary mode of intra-Alaskan transportation in Southeast is by the Alaska Marine Highway ferries. The Lynn Canal route of the ferry system (Juneau-Haines-Skagway) is the only profitable route in the entire system and often receives a large amount of ferry traffic, especially in the summer.

The Haines Airport has a large amount of traffic, with one air carrier (Alaska Seaplanes) providing services to Skagway and Juneau. Haines became a port-of-call to several cruise ship operators including Princess Cruises and the Holland America Line. The cruise ship visiting frequency was about 18 per season in 2009, according to local residents. Between 2010 and 2012, an average of 30,000 cruise ship passengers visited annually. The cruise ship berth is close to Fort William H. Seward.

== Health care ==
Haines is served by Haines Health Center, the only primary health clinic in the area. The facility is part of the Southeast Alaska Regional Health Consortium, or SEARHC, a non-profit tribal health consortium of 18 Native communities. The area is served by local emergency medical services. Individuals in need of dire medical attention are transported by air via helicopter or air ambulance to Bartlett Regional Hospital in Juneau (approximately 35 minutes away by plane). Whitehorse General Hospital in Whitehorse, Yukon is the nearest hospital to Haines which is accessible by road (approximately 4.5 hours away).

The difficulties in accessing health care for rural dwellers in general were examined in a short black-and-white documentary set and filmed in and around Haines in 1956, documenting and dramatizing a stop on the travels of a public health nurse and doctor (both female) aboard a traveling clinic boat, Hygiene. According to the voiceover narration, the film was cast with local non-actors.

== Media ==
Haines is served by a weekly newspaper, the Chilkat Valley News, as well as a public radio station, KHNS, which serves upper Lynn Canal (Haines, Skagway, and Klukwan); its studio is in Haines.

== In popular culture ==
At the conclusion of El Camino, which is the 2019 epilogue film to the series Breaking Bad, Jesse Pinkman obtains a new identity, escapes Albuquerque, New Mexico, and moves to Haines.

== Notable people ==
- Florence Shotridge, Tlingit ethnographer, museum educator, and weaver
- Jennie Thlunaut, Tlingit master weaver
- Bill Thomas, commercial fisherman and former member of the Alaska House of Representatives
