= Chilkat Peninsula =

Peninsula in Alaska, United States

Coordinates: 59°11′16″N 135°22′23″W

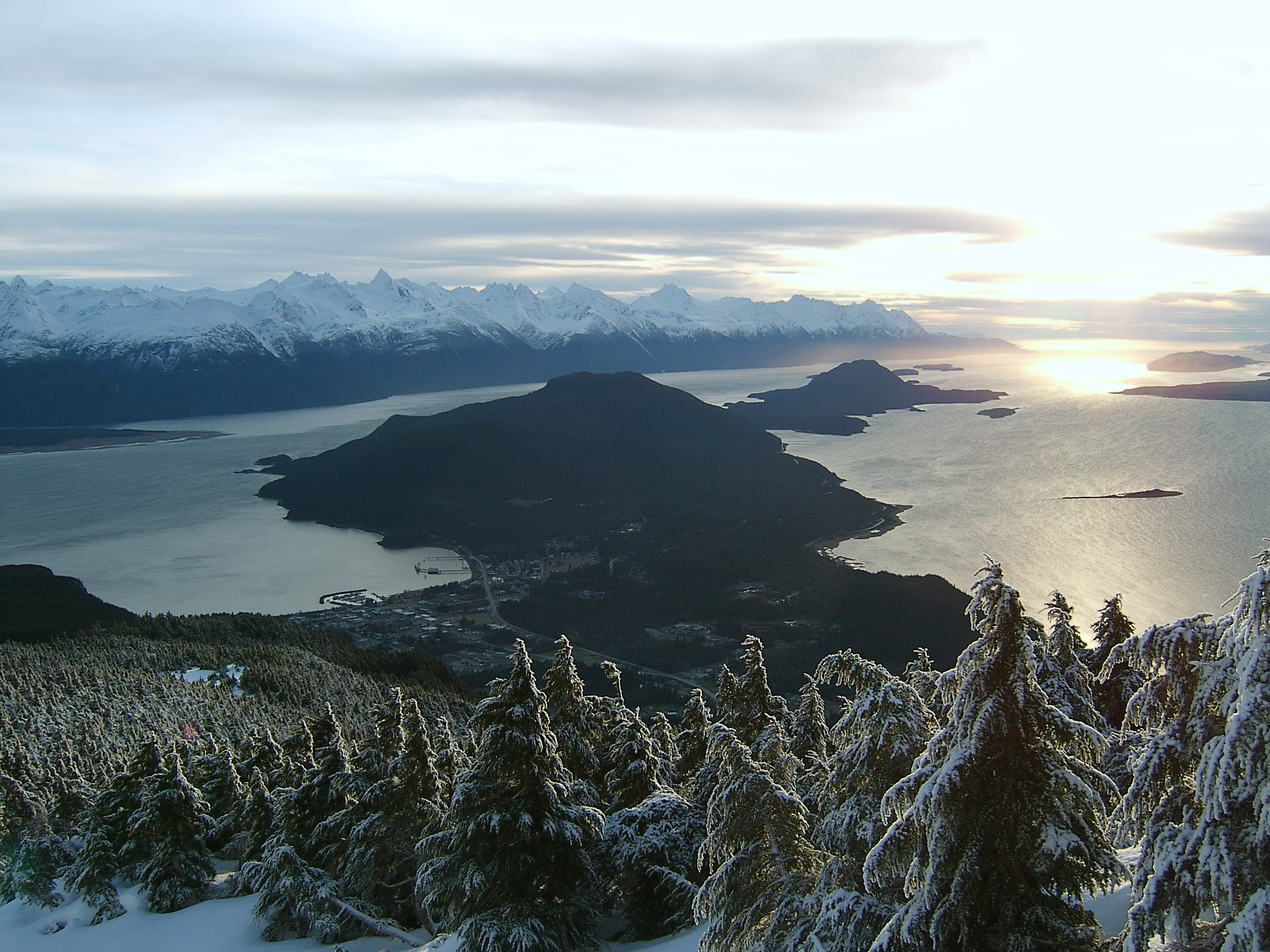
The Chilkat Peninsula from the Takshanuk Mountains with Haines in the foreground

The Chilkat Peninsula is a peninsula in Lynn Canal, Southeast Alaska, that divides the Chilkoot and Chilkat Inlets and divides the Chilkat and Chilkoot watersheds. The peninsula extends into Lynn Canal as well. It was first charted in 1794 by Joseph Whidbey, master of HMS Discovery during George Vancouver's 1791–1795 expedition.

The town of Haines sits on the northern end of the peninsula, while the neighborhood of Mud Bay is located closer towards the center of the peninsula.

== Gallery ==
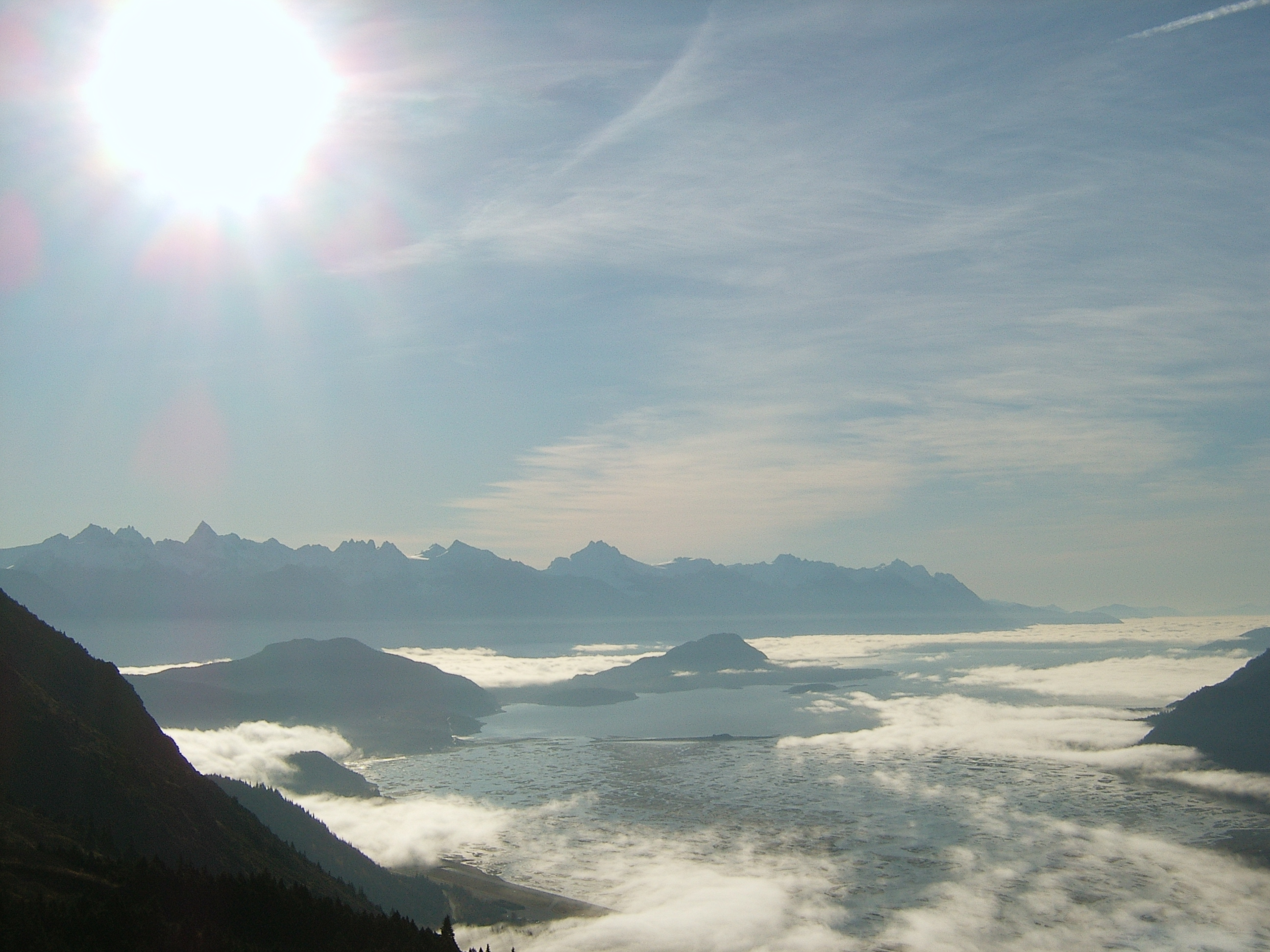
