= Takshanuk Mountains =

Mountain range in Alaska, U.S.

Coordinates: 59°23′45″N 135°47′34″W

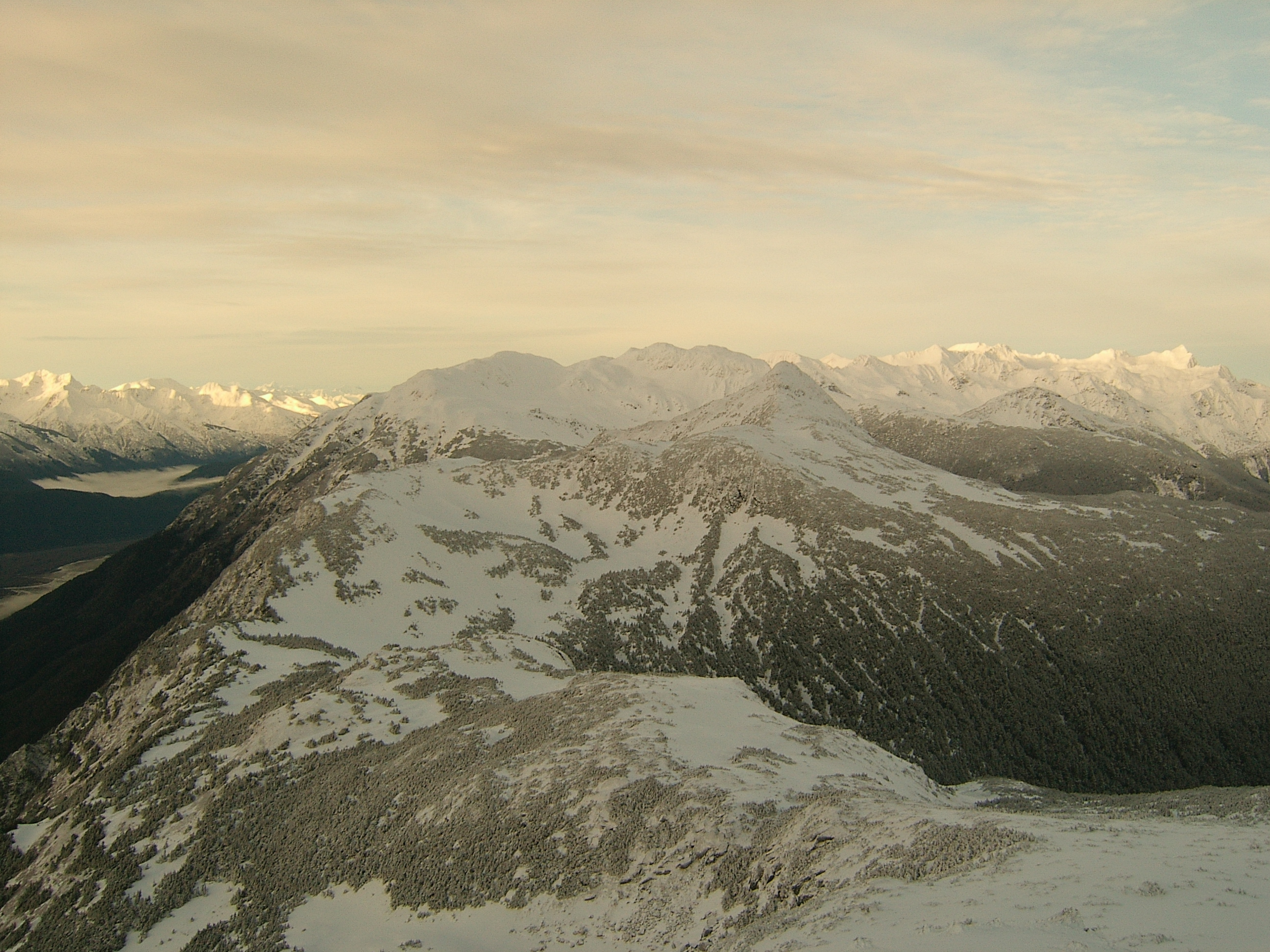

Highest point
- Elevation: 5,141 ft (1,567 m)

Dimensions
- Length: 26 mi (42 km)

Geography

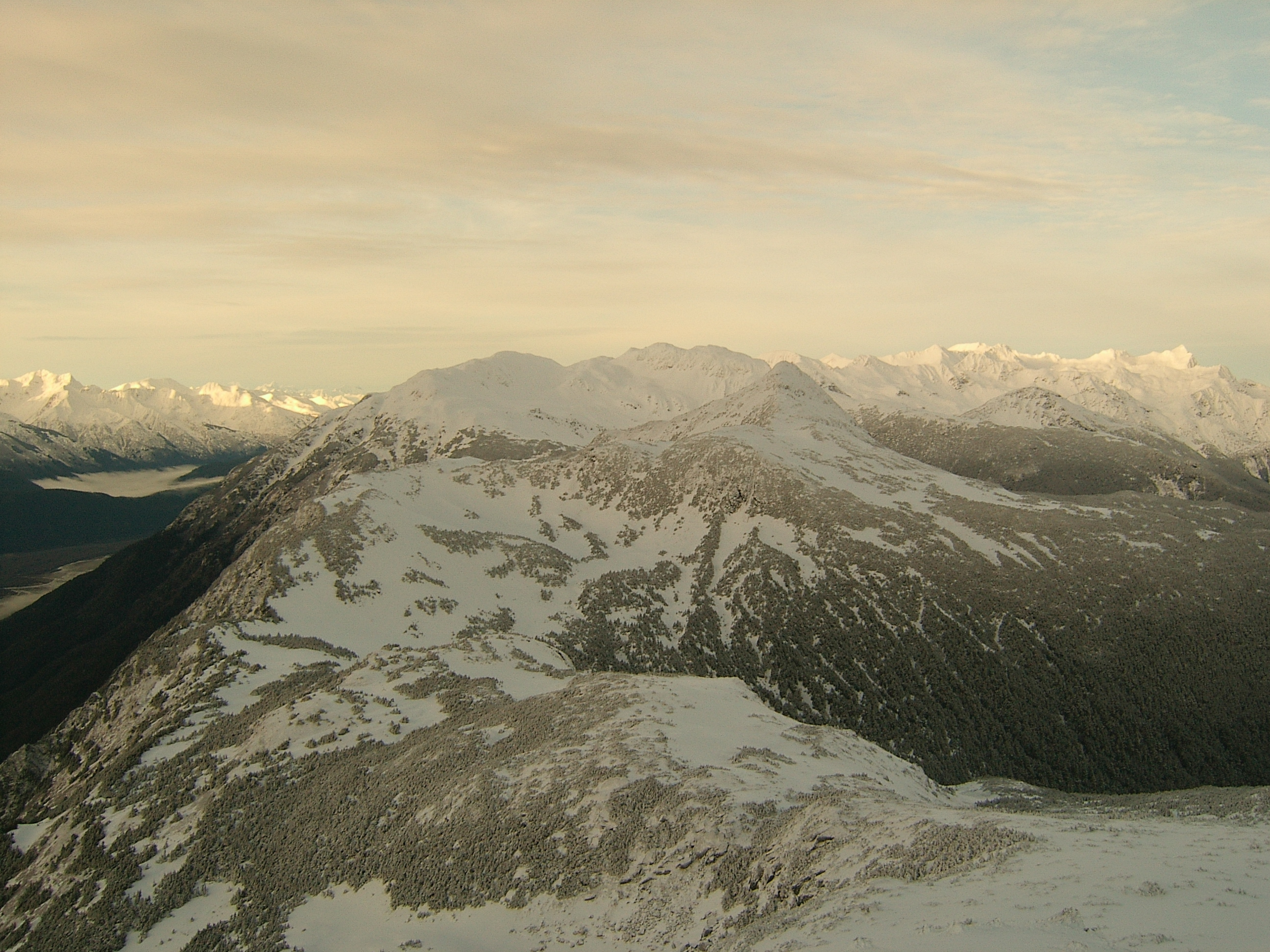
A view of the southern end of the Takshanuk Mountains. The Chilkat River can barely be glimpsed in the lower lefthand corner.

The Takshanuk Mountains are a mountain range in Southeast Alaska, United States, that separate the Chilkoot and Chilkat watersheds and also form the northern portion of the Chilkat Peninsula.

Notable peaks include Mount Ripinski, Peak 3920, and Tukgahgo Mountain.

Primary access to the mountains is via the community of Haines or the Haines Highway.
