= Chilkat River =

River in Canada and the United States

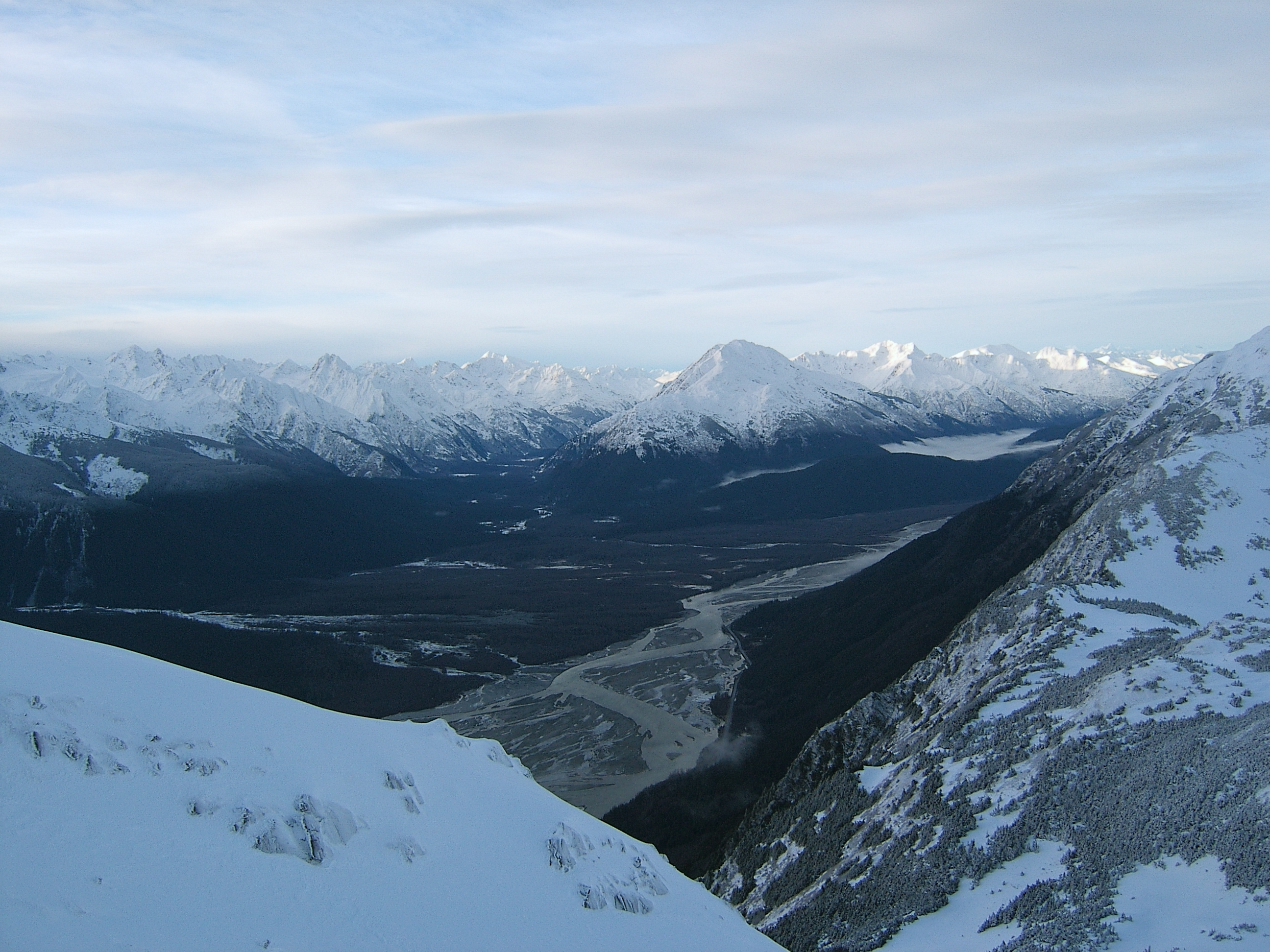
- A view up the Chilkat River valley from the Takshanuk Mountains

- Location of the mouth of the Chilkat River in Alaska

Location
- Countries: Canada, United States
- Province: British Columbia
- State: Alaska

Physical characteristics
- Source
  - location: Chilkat Glacier, Coast Mountains
- Mouth: Chilkat Inlet
  - location: 1 mile (1.6 km) southwest of Haines, Saint Elias Mountains
  - coordinates: 59°12′15″N 135°28′47″W
  - elevation: 0 ft (0 m)
- Length: 52 mi (84 km)

The Chilkat River is a river in British Columbia and southeastern Alaska that flows southward from the Coast Range to the Chilkat Inlet and ultimately Lynn Canal. It is 84 kilometres (52 mi) long. It begins at Chilkat Glacier, in Alaska, flows west and south in British Columbia for 27 kilometres (17 mi), enters Alaska and continues southwest for another 60 kilometres (37 mi). It reaches the ocean at the abandoned area of Wells, Alaska and deposits into a long delta area.

The river was named by the Russians for the Chilkat group of Tlingit, called /t͡ʃiɬqut/ in their own language, who lived in the region. The name means "salmon storehouse".

Near the Chilkat River is the Alaska Chilkat Bald Eagle Preserve, where thousands of bald eagles appear between October and February, to take advantage of late salmon runs. Nearby Haines, the nearest town, is the most common organization spot for birdwatchers.

== Threats ==
The Chilkat was listed as one of America's Most Endangered Rivers in 2019 and again in 2023 due to threats from the Palmer Project, a proposed underground copper and zinc mine sited upstream from the Tlingit village of Klukwan. If built, the project is feared to result in pollution from acidic wastewater laced with heavy metals and hydrocarbons.

== Tributaries ==
- Klehini River
- Tsirku River

== See also ==
- Chilkat Peninsula
- List of rivers of Alaska
- List of rivers of British Columbia
