= Chilkoot Inlet =

Inlet on the Chilkat peninsula in Alaska, U.S.

Coordinates: 59°13′33″N 135°21′28″W

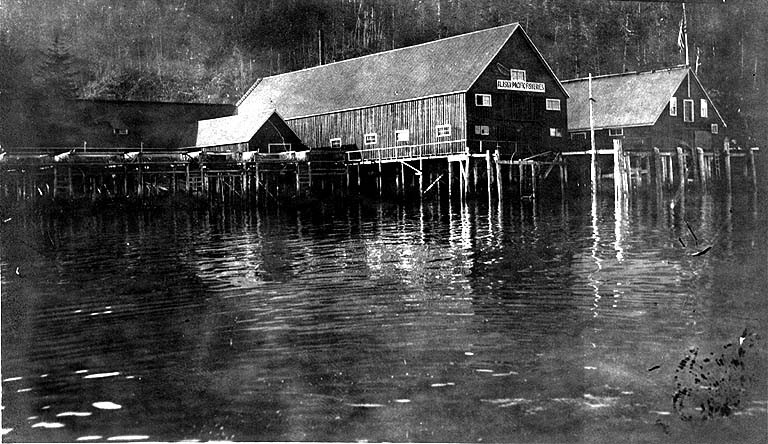
American Pacific Fisheries cannery at Chilkoot Inlet

Chilkoot Inlet is an inlet in the Southeast region of the U.S. state of Alaska, located on the eastern side of the Chilkat Peninsula in Lynn Canal. Chilkoot Inlet is the terminus of the Chilkoot River and its watershed, and also home to Lutak, Alaska. It was first charted in 1794 by Joseph Whidbey, master of HMS Discovery during George Vancouver's 1791–1795 expedition.
