= Chilkoot =

Chilkoot or The Chilkoot may refer to:

== People ==
- Chilkoot Tlingit, a band of Tlingit Alaska Natives
- Chilkoot Indian Association, a federally recognized tribe in Haines, Alaska

== Places ==
- Chilkoot Barracks, an alternative name for Fort William H. Seward, Alaska, USA
- Chilkoot Inlet, terminus of the Chilkoot River, in Alaska
- Chilkoot Lake, in Haines Township, Alaska; source of the Chilkoot River
- Chilkoot Pass, on the Chilkoot Trail, crossing from Alaska, USA to BC, Canada, over the Coast Mountains
- Chilkoot Reservation, a U.S. Indian Reservation in Alaska, see List of Indian reservations in the United States
- Chilkoot River, a river in southeast Alaska
- Chilkoot Trail, a part of the Klondike Gold Rush Trail between Dyea, Alaska, USA, and Bennett Lake, British Columbia, Canada
- Port Chilkoot, a former municipality which was merged into Haines, Alaska

== See also ==
- Chilkoot Trail and Dyea Site, a National Historic Landmark in Alaska
- Chilkat (disambiguation)
