= Deer Rock =

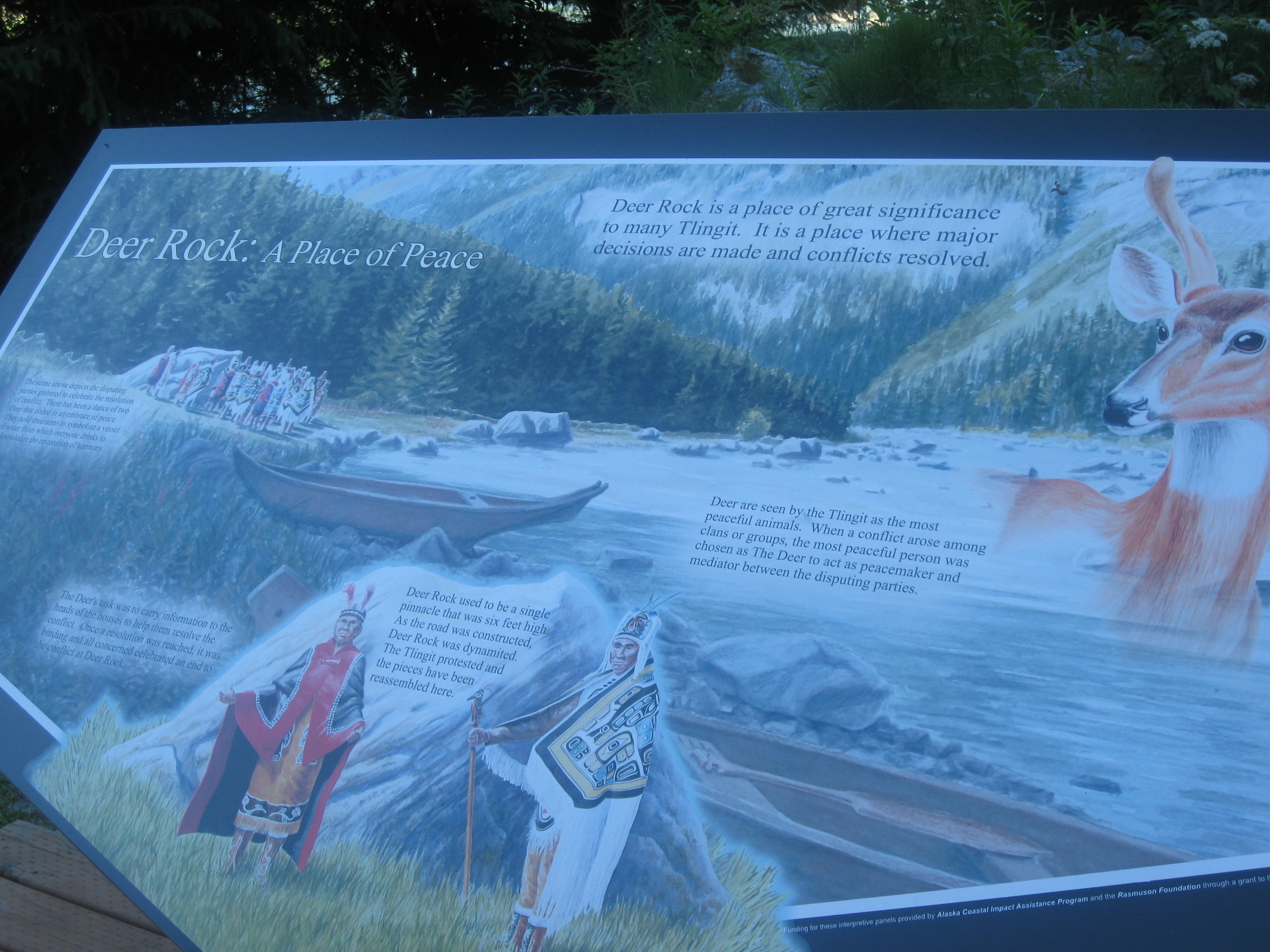
Plaque depicting the Deer Rock with clan leaders in front of single piece of rock

The Deer Rock, also called Peace Rock, is located on the right bank of the Chilkoot River in Southeast Alaska in the Haines Borough, Alaska of USA. In the language of the Raven Clan and Eagle Clan of the Tlingit Alaskan Indian tribes also known as the Chilkat (Kukhwan) and the Chilkoot (Haines), the rock is called as the Gowakaan Teiyee, and is of great significance to them as they held negotiations on this rock to arrive at a peaceful settlement of the tragic conflicts of the past. Tluk^{w}Axadi clan named the “rock” with the prefix “Deer”, as they believed that the Deer represented peace for now and always. A clan member who was chosen to mediate a settlement to end the conflict sat over this rock after truce in the battle between the clans, to think peacefully and to arrive at the most acceptable terms of settlement. Thereafter, with diplomatic finesse, in the presence of the Deer Rock, the warring clans settled their differences and since then no further conflicts have occurred between them. This Deer Rock was thus witness to peaceful settlement that saved countless members of the Raven and Eagle clans of the Tlingit tribe who would have otherwise died if the war had continued. Since then the Deer Rock has become a heritage monument of the Tlingit people.

== History ==
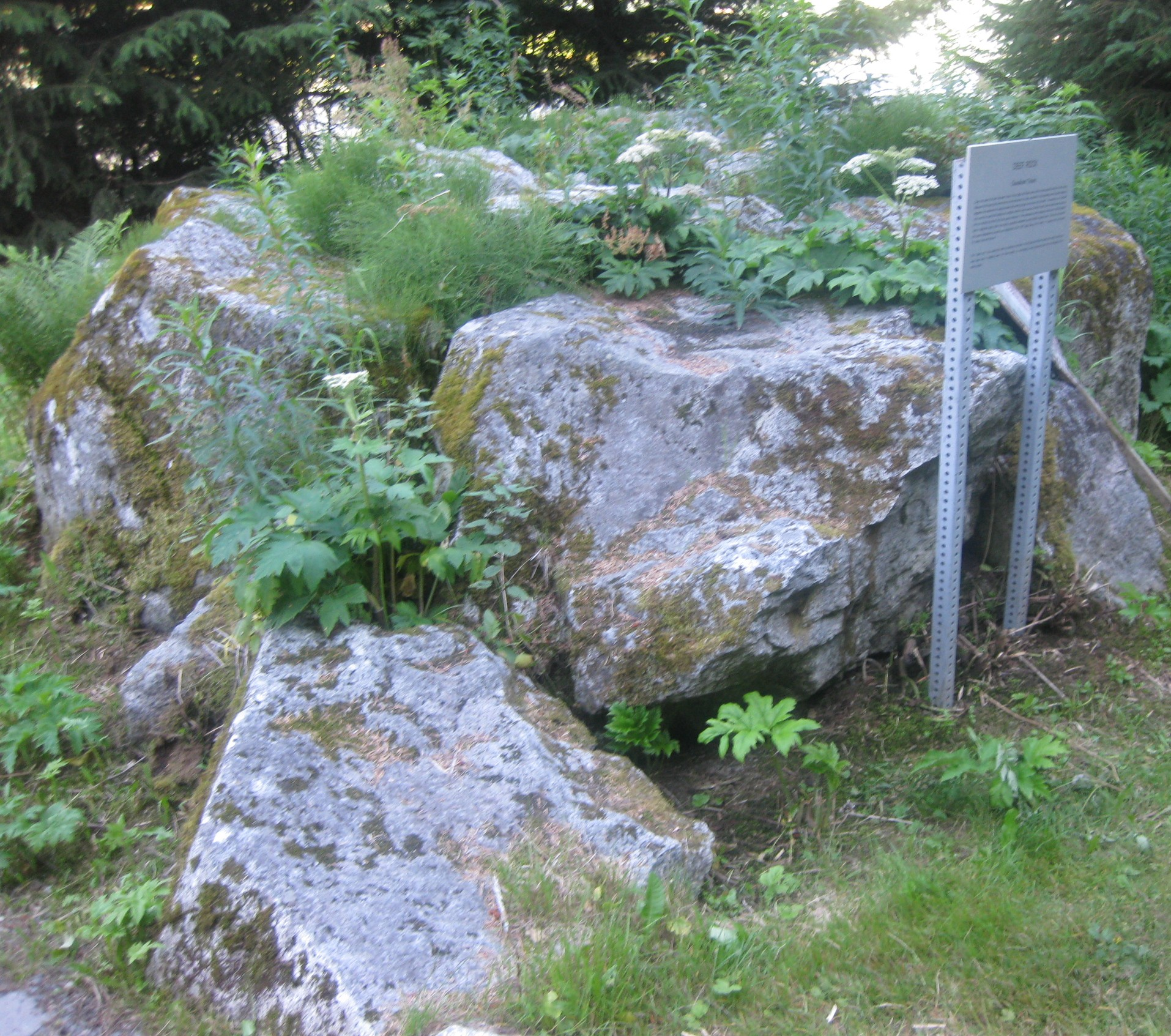
Full view of Deer Rock with plaque

Chilkat (Klukwan) and Chilkoot (Haines) are two Tlingit villages in the Haines Borough of Alaska. Chilkoot is west of Haines, while Chilkat is eastward of Haines. There was a big village at the southern end of Chilkat Lake and temporary camps scattered all the way from Chilkoot to Haines. There existed forts between the two on the Chilkat River. The two groups though separate geographically and psychologically have a common history. Free access of one community to that of the other existed and they greatly intermarried under Native law. However, at some time in the past, these two Tlingit communities were not in perfect harmony. In a battle that took place between the two ethnic groups, six people were killed from each group. The internecine fight ensued as a result of a Chilkoot cousin refusing the request of his Chilkat cousin for a “pack load of eulachon” and it flared up into a battle for “balance of honor.” In this battle, six people from each clan were killed. The clan leaders then decided to declare ceasefire to the conflict and then pursued for peace at the Deer Rock.

== Desecration and restoration ==
In 1971, Deer Rock was bulldozed by the State Highway authorities to build a one-mile road along Chilkoot River to its head at Chilkoot Lake. During this construction, two cemeteries and a village site were also uprooted. This caused intense indignation among the native Indian tribes since their ancestral graves were dug up and human skeletons of their exposed. Moreover, the Deer Rock, which had great significance for restoring peace among the two clans in the past, was also blasted into several fragments. A strong protest agitation was organized by the native clans, led by Austin Hammond, objecting to this unwarranted destruction of their heritage and desecration of the revered graves of their ancestral people. In order to appease the Indians, the State Legislature got the rock fragments cemented together with allocation of funds for the purpose. In addition, Land Use Plans were also developed to protect the Chilkoot Lake area. They also held a formal service at the location for maintaining peace. However, many Native Indian leaders abstained from this service. Eventually, about one month later, Austin Hammond, the headman of l’koot, held a traditional peace ceremony along with the people of the native Tlingits at Deer Rock and renewed the pledge for “maintaining brotherhood between Chilkat and Chilkoot people, and also with their white neighbors.” Thus, Deer Rock has become a symbol of a saga of amicable compromise.

== Peace ceremony ==
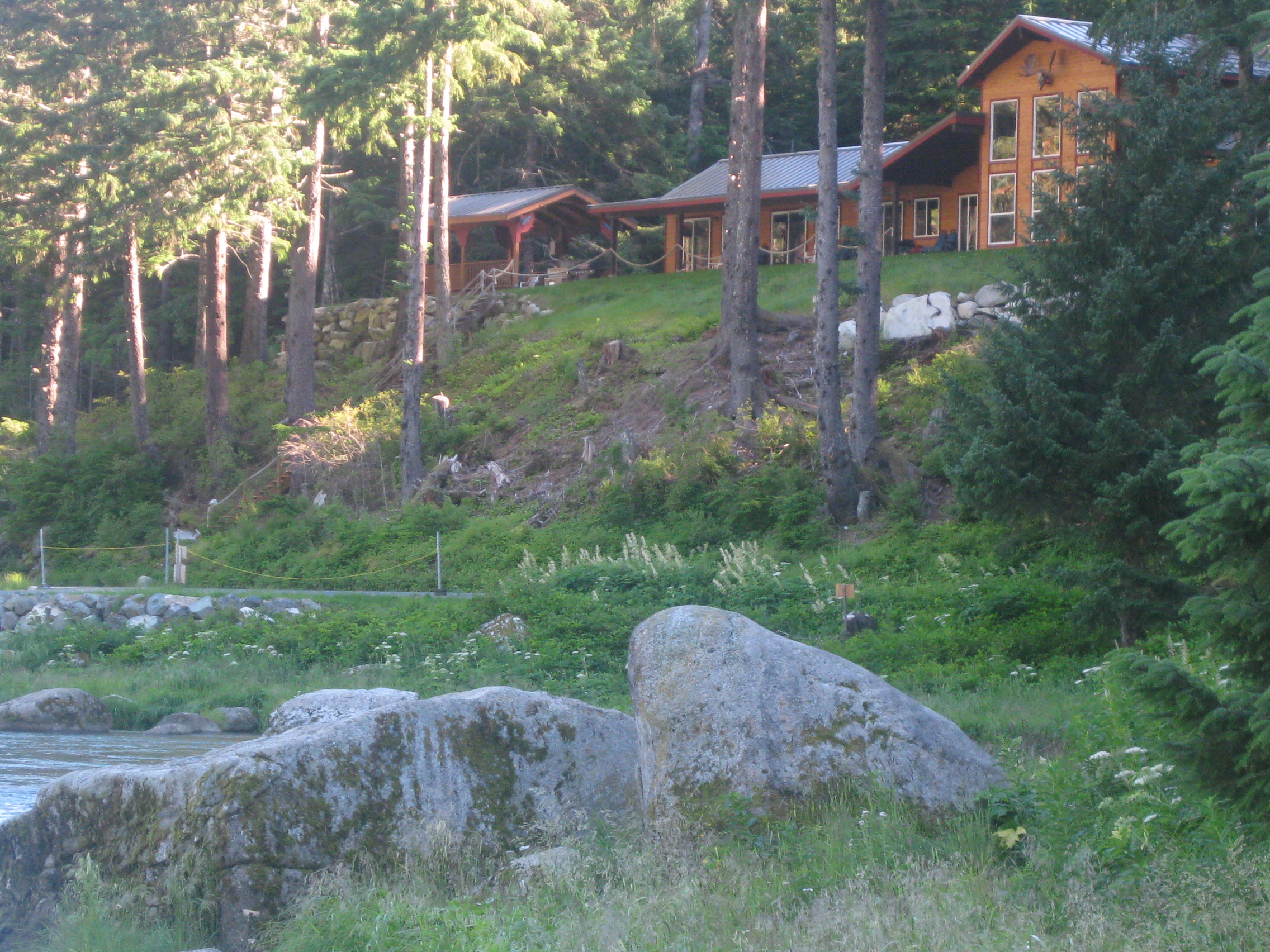
Deer Rock near Highway

The peace ceremony held at the Deer Rock was explained by the Clan leader Austin Hammond, in a film named Ha Shgaoon produced in 1980. The peace ceremony held at Chilkoot was to protest the demolition of traditional village, fishing sites as well as tomb sites (skeletons were exposed due to the bull dozing at site) that occurred due to road building. The script of the speech made by Austin on the occasion states:

we are making only our requests that the peace rock or “Deer Rock” Guwakan teiyi, broken into pieces by road builders, be made whole; that the fish weir be removed, that our sacred burial grounds be protected so never again will be bones of our ancestors lay scattered and disturbed; and we ask that we may lawfully catch salmon for our subsistence in this river, a heritage denied to us that is rightfully ours.

== Gallery ==
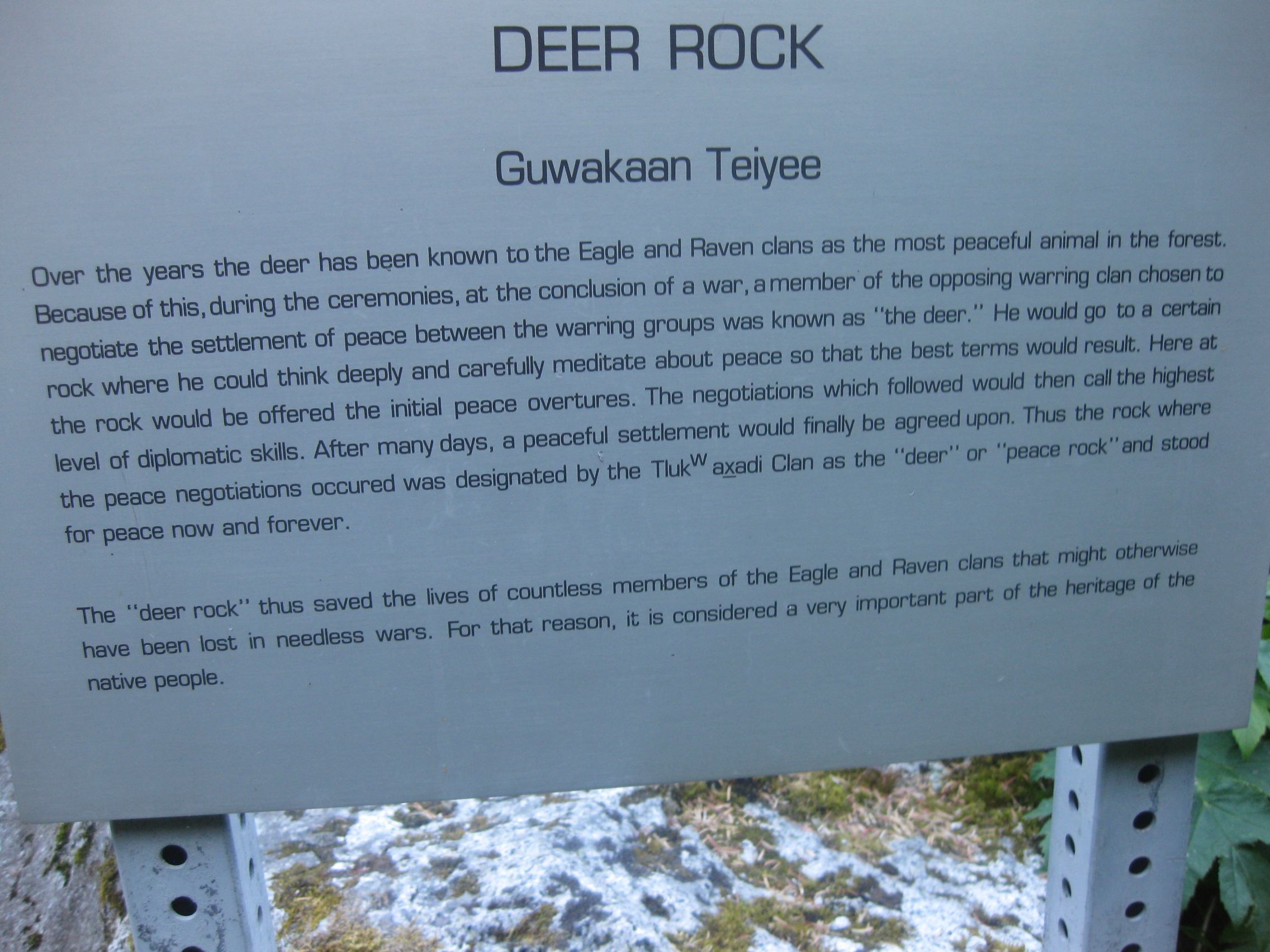
Plaque with history of Deer Rock

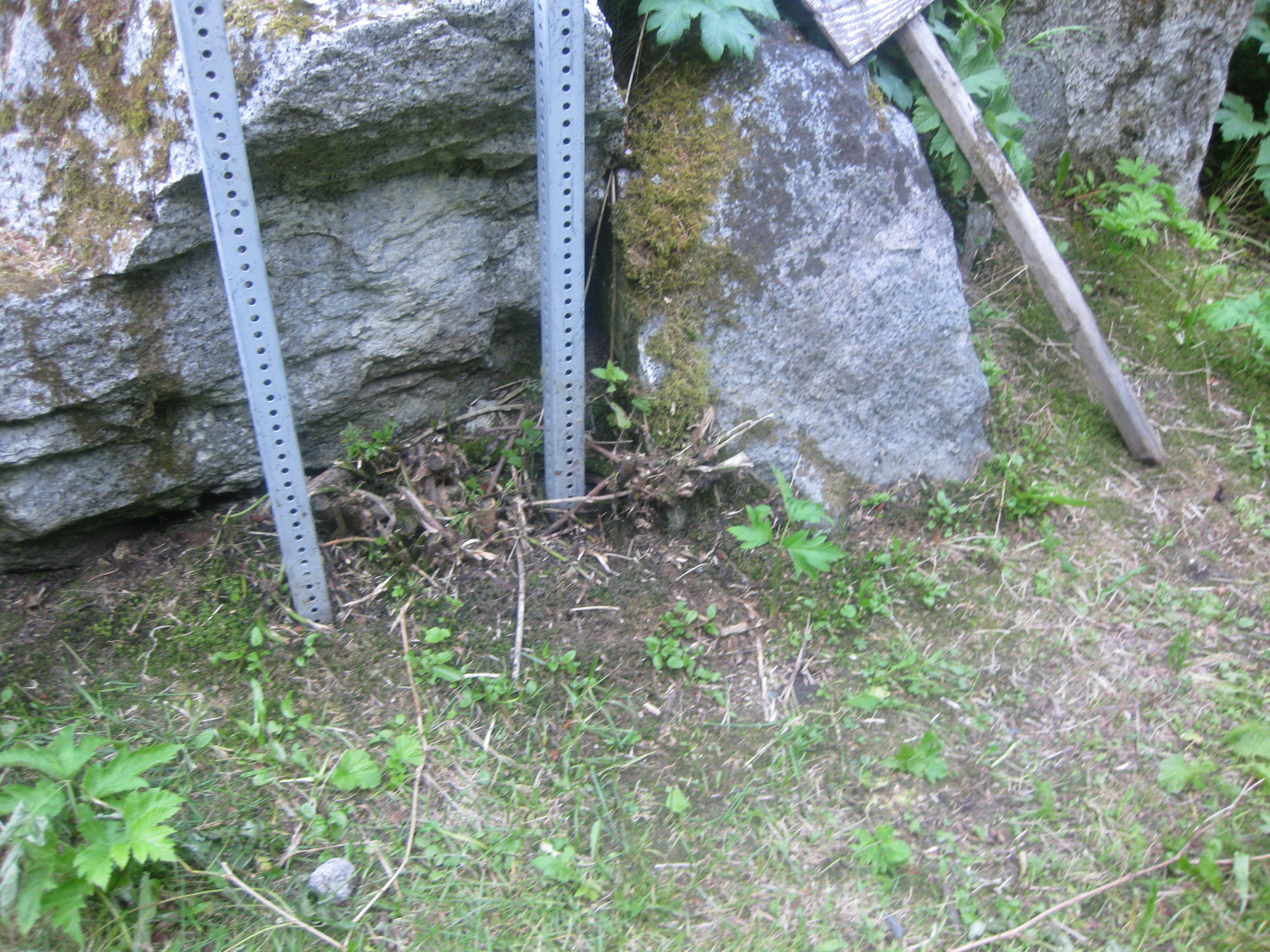
Base of Deer Rock

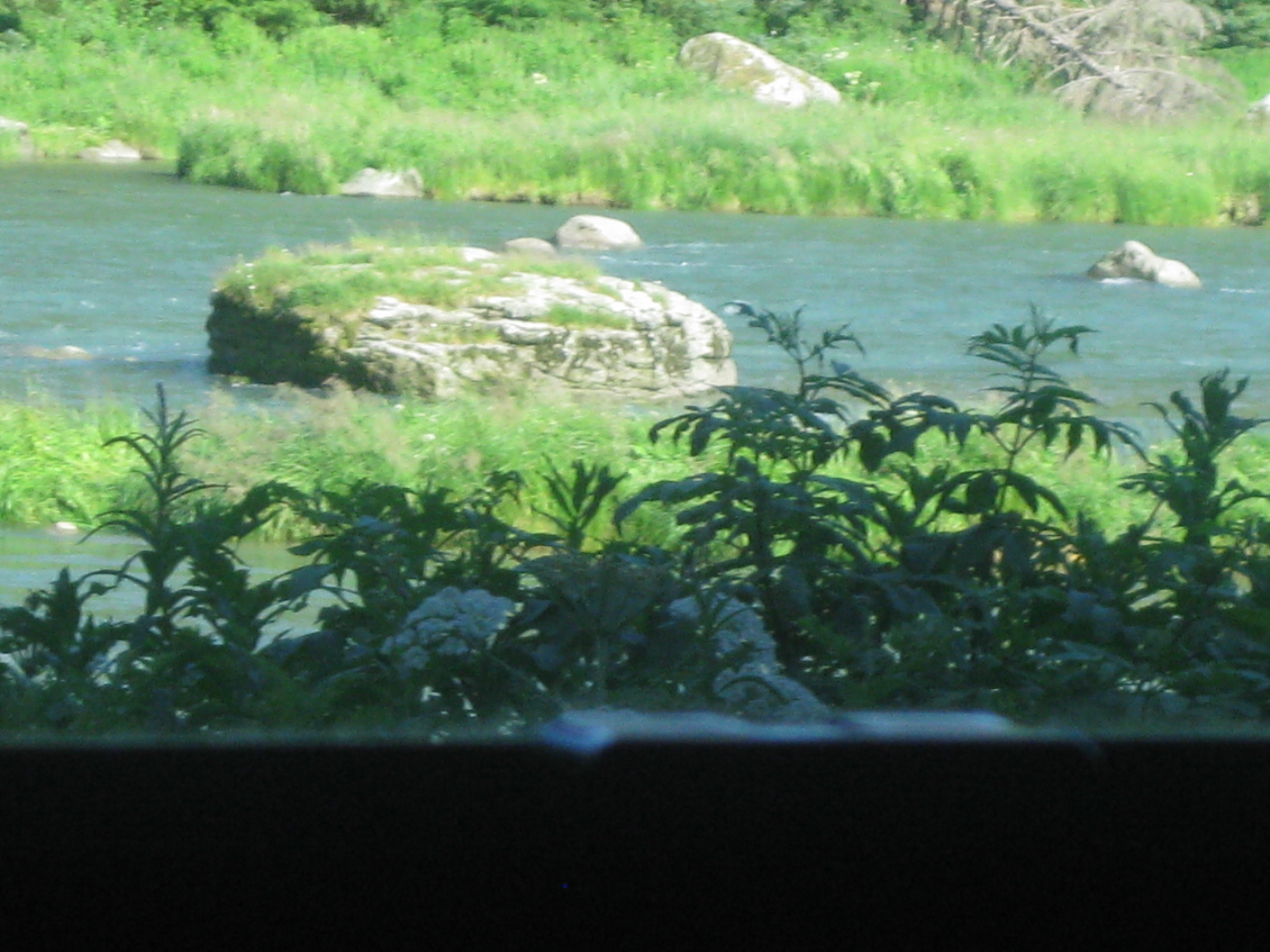
Chilkoot River flowing near Deer Rock

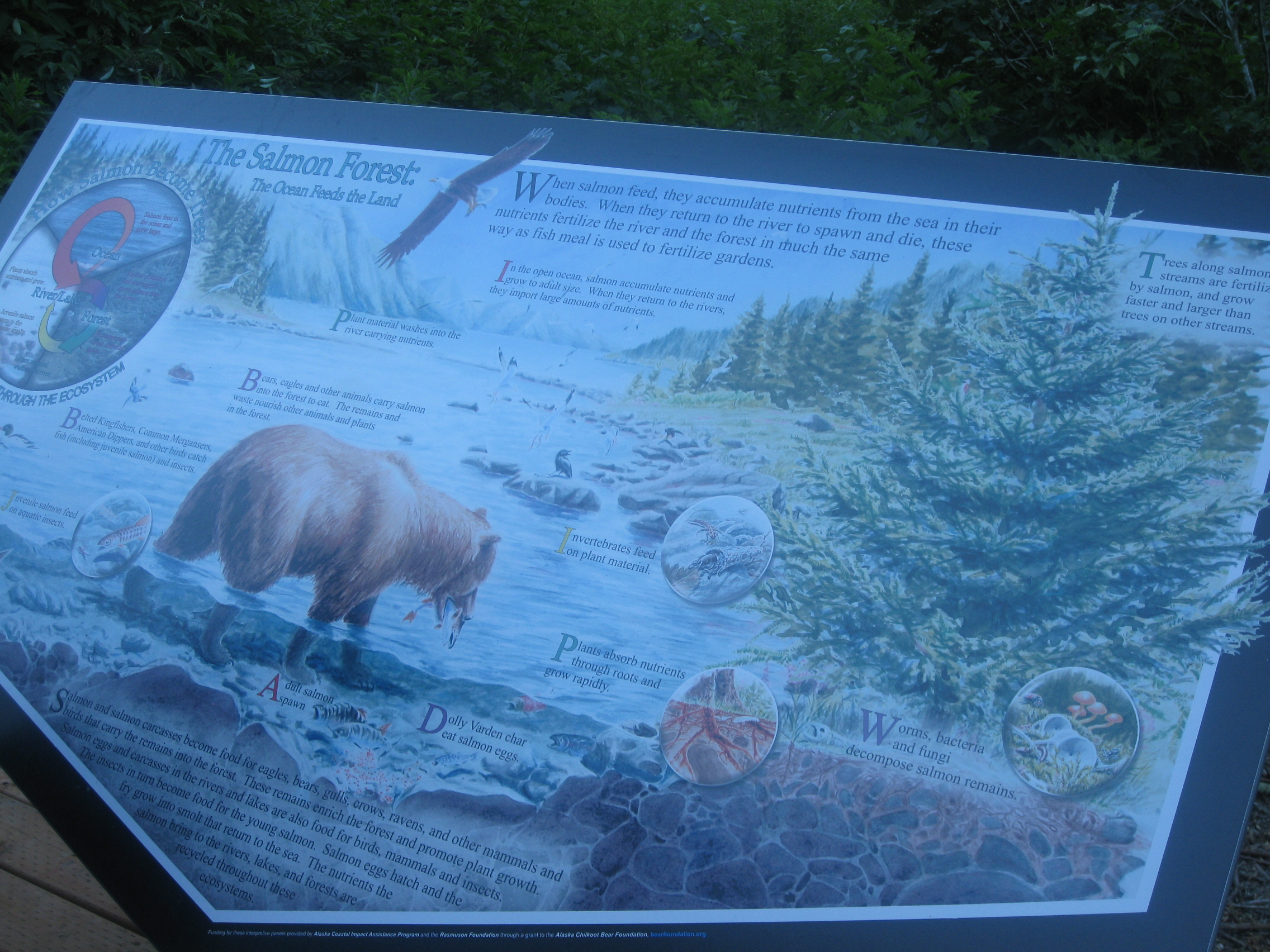
Deer Rock amidst Salmon Forest
