= Chilcoot =

Chilcoot may refer to:

- Chilcoot, California, an unincorporated community
- Chilkoot River, Alaska
- Chilkoot Pass, in Alaska and British Columbia, Canada
- Chilkoot Lake, Alaska
- Chilkoot Inlet, Alaska

== See also ==
- Chilcoot-Vinton, California, a census-designated place
