= Chilkat =

Chilkat or The Chilkat, or Chilkats, may refer to:

== Chilkat tribe and related uses ==
- Chilkat Tlingit, a tribe found on the Chilkat River and on Chilkat Peninsula
- Chilkat Indian Village, the federally recognized tribe of Chilkat Tlingit
  - Chilkat Reservation, a U.S. Indian Reservation in Alaska, see List of Indian reservations in the United States
- Chilkat weaving, a traditional form of weaving practiced by Tlingit, Haida, Tsimshian, and other Northwest Coast peoples of Alaska and British Columbia.
  - Chilkat blanket, a type of blanket which uses Chilkat weaving

== Places ==
- Chilkat Range or Chilkat Mountains, a mountain range in Haines Borough, Alaska, USA
- Chilkat Pass, a mountain pass between BC, Canada and Alaska, USA over the Coast Mountains, lying on the Dalton Trail and Haines Highway
- Chilkat Trail or Dalton Trail, a Klondike Gold Rush Trail between coastal Alaska and the goldfields in the Yukon
- Chilkat Peninsula, a peninsula in southeast Alaska that divides the Chilkat Inlet from the Chilkoot Inlet
- Chilkat Inlet, the terminus of the Chilkat River, in Alaska
- Chilkat River, a river originating from the Chilkat Glacier in BC, Canada, and flowing into Chilkat Inlet in Alaska, USA
  - Chilkat Valley, a river valley in Alaska in Haines Borough, of the Chilkat River
- Chilkat Glacier, British Columbia, Canada; the source of the Chilkat River
- Chilkat Lake, a lake in Haines, Alaska, see List of lakes of Alaska
- Chilkat Islands, islands of Alaska, see List of islands of Alaska

== Other uses ==
- MV Chilkat, a ferry, part of the Alaska Marine Highway
- USS Chilkat, a U.S. Navy ship, see List of United States Navy ships: C
- Chilkat Oil Company Refinery Site
- Chilkat Valley News

== See also ==
- Chilkoot (disambiguation)
