= Chilkoot River =

River in Alaska, United States

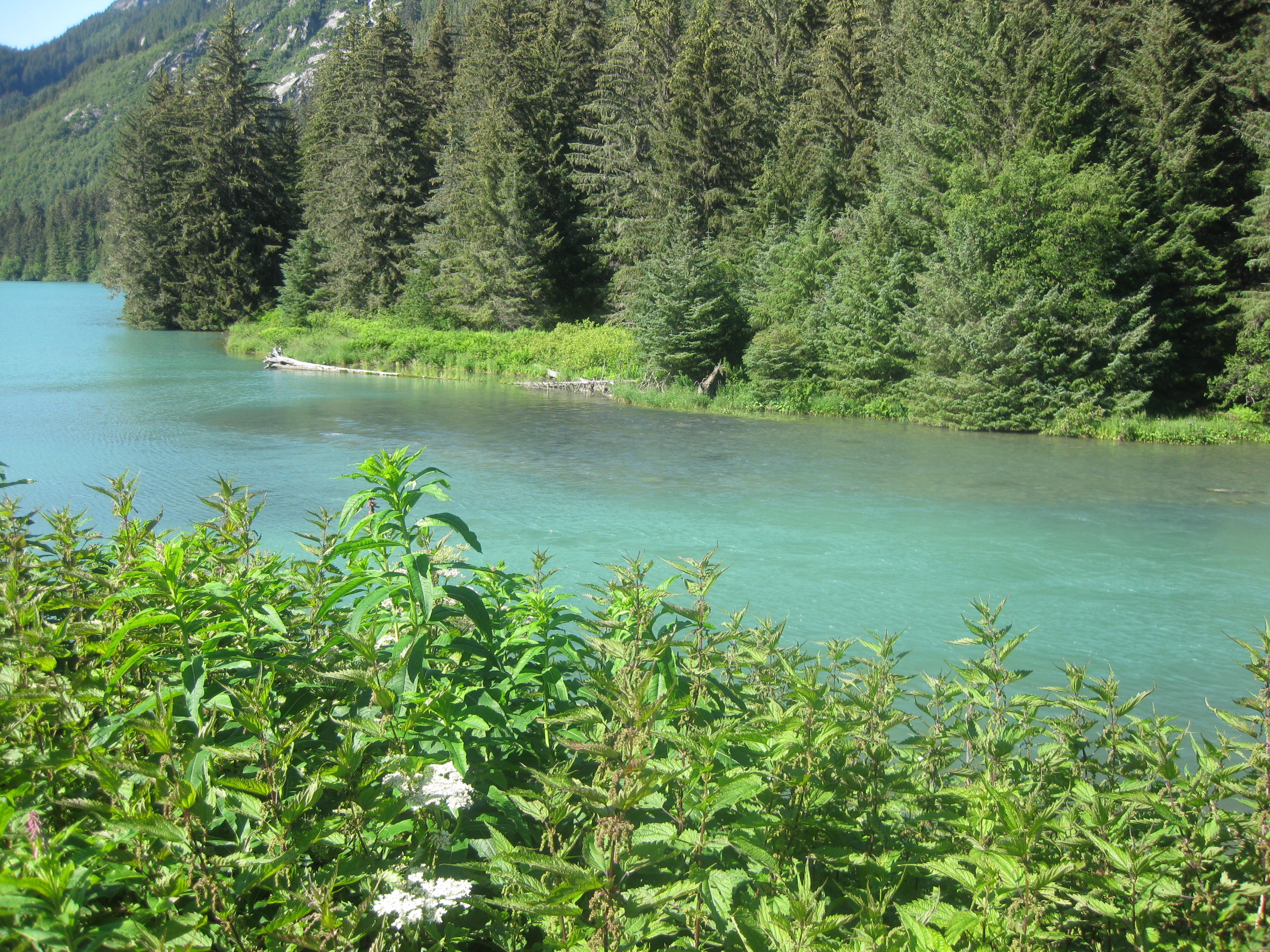
- Chilkooot River from the Chilkoot Lake outlet

- Location of the mouth of the Chilkoot River in Alaska

Location
- Country: US

Physical characteristics
- Source
  - location: Takshanuk Mountains of Haines Borough, Alaska
- Mouth
  - location: Chilkoot Inlet into the Lynn Canal
  - elevation: 30 feet (9.1 m)
- Length: 20 miles (32 km)
- Basin size: Alaska, USA
- Discharge
  - average: 59 cubic feet per second (1.7 m^{3}/s) in February to a maximum of 2,490 cubic feet per second (71 m^{3}/s) in August

Basin features
- River system: Chilkoot River Watershed

The Chilkoot River is a river in Southeast Alaska, United States, that extends about 20 miles (32 km) from its source and covers a watershed area of 100 square miles (260 km^{2}). The source of the river is in the Takshanuk Mountains to the west and the Freebee glacier and unnamed mountains to the east. From its source, the upper reach of the river extends approximately 16 miles (26 km) to the point where it enters Chilkoot Lake. From the downstream end of the lake, the lower reach of the river flows for about 1.5 miles (2.4 km) until it enters the Chilkoot Inlet, a branch at the northern end of the Lynn Canal.

At the head of the lower reach of the river, on the shore of the lake, lies a prehistoric village which was a Chilkoot Indian settlement. The names of the village — Tschilkut, Tananel, or Chilcoot — have been given to the river and also to the lake.

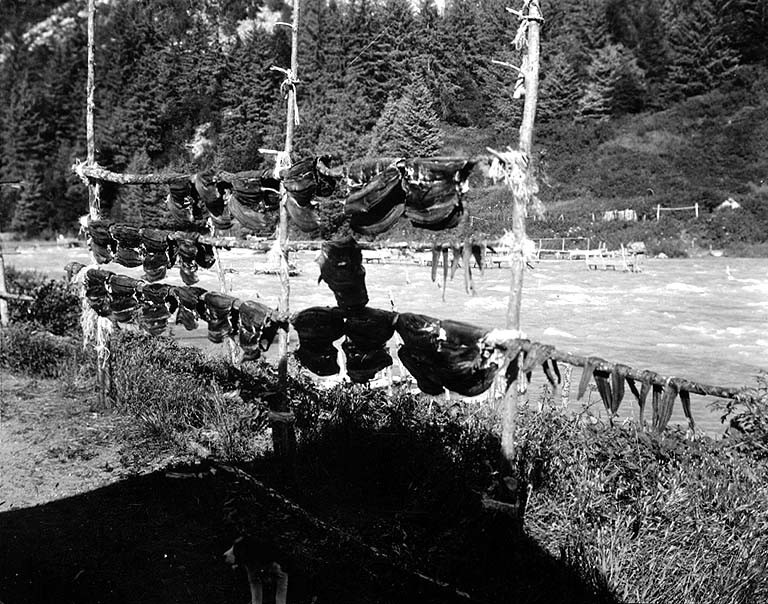
Salmon drying on fish racks along the Chilkoot River, August 1911

The river and its precincts, known as the Chilkoot River Corridor, have been brought under the monitoring of the Chilkoot River Corridor Strategic Planning Project (CRC) to preserve its ecological and historical heritage. A fishing weir has also been constructed on the river to monitor and count fish moving from the lake into the lower reaches of the Chilkoot River and the Chilkoot Inlet.

== Topography ==
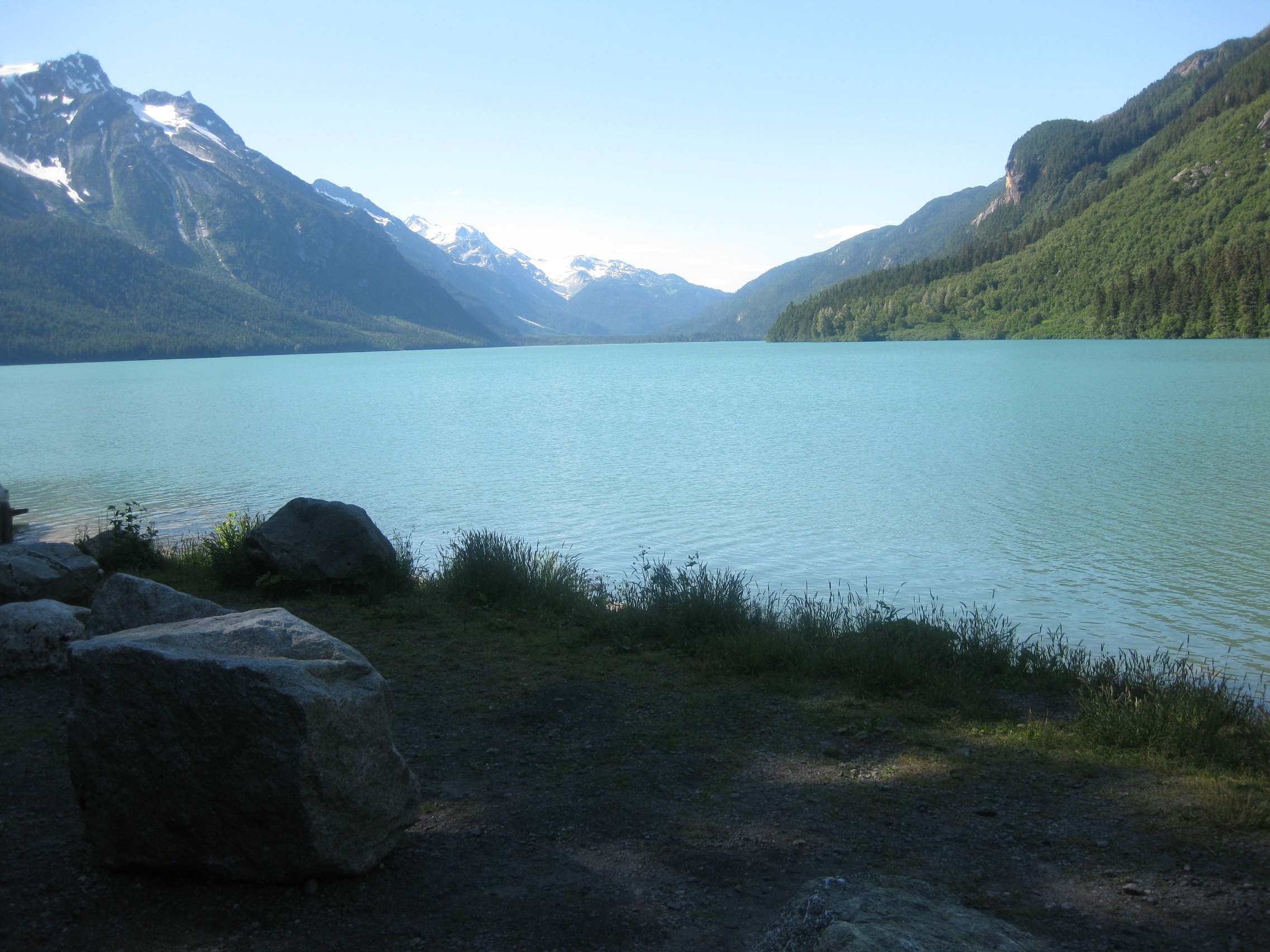
Upstream view of Chilkoot Lake and its watershed formed by Takshanuk Mountains and Ferebee glacier

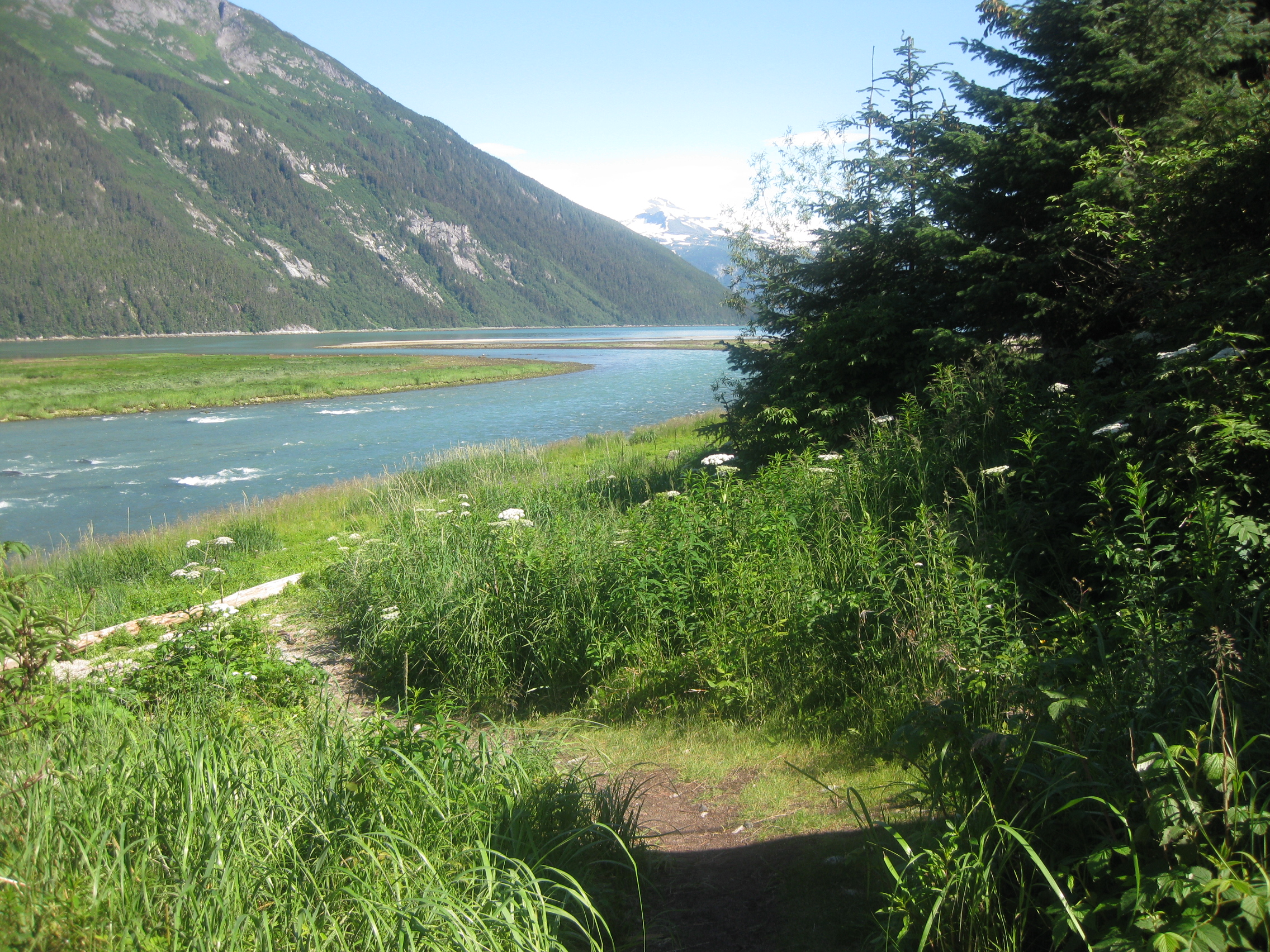
Chilkoot Lake merges with Lynn Canal

The Chilkoot River near Haines has a short length of about 20 miles (32 km) from the source covering a watershed area of 100 square miles (260 km^{2}). The source of the river is in the Takshanuk Mountains to the west and the Ferebee glacier and unnamed mountains to the east.

There are three stretches of the river from its source. These are: the "Upper Reach of the Chilkoot River" from the lake's mouth upstream to the glacier head, which is about 30 miles (48 km); the "Chilkoot Lake" fed by the upper reach of the river extends to about 2.5 miles (4.0 km) length followed by the "Chilkoot Lower reach", which is 1.5 miles (2.4 km) till it joins the Lynn Canal.

The Upper Chilkoot River originates from the glacier fields and flows in a southeasterly direction. It is a braided river and has a bed slope of 1 ft in 50 ft in the first 5 miles (8.0 km) stretch from the lake and about 1 ft in 100 ft in the balance reach of the river. The river is blocked with debris, rifles, log jams and boulders. Hence, the upper reach of the river is not navigable. The upstream reaches of the Chilkoot River and all other streams which flow into the lake are barred for fishing.

The Chilkoot Lake, which forms the middle stretch of the Chilkoot River, is marked on the quadrant map of the Skagway B 2 USGS in the Heines County at an altitude of 30 feet (9.1 m). The lake is about 2.5 miles (4.0 km) long (3.6 miles is also mentioned in one source), and about 1 mile (1.6 km) in width and maximum depth of water in the lake is about 300 feet (91 m). It has been declared as navigable. The land around the lake (1,600 acres (650 ha)) is mostly under the control of the State. The lake area is generally windy. Canoes are the best form of boating facility for fishing on the lake as the shore line is considered difficult.

The lower reach of the Chilkoot River below the outlet from the Chilkoot Lake at 60°23′N 151°18′W is 1.5 miles (a figure of 1 mile (1.6 km) is also mentioned in some sources) long till it meets the Lynn Canal of the Chilkoot Inlet. The river runs in northwest-northeast direction and is really only a small stream. It has a width of about 3.6 yards (3.3 m) and has a depth of 2 feet (0.61 m) on an average. It is navigable up to about 0.5 miles (0.80 km) upstream of the Lynn Canal, extending to the fish and game weir site (established by the Department of Fish and Game to enumerate the fishes), when under the influence of tides. The river, in its first one eighth mile (below the lake) has formed a pool, and then flows through a number of rapids strewn with boulders covered with moss in some stretches and the remaining part is flat but with rocky bed. The estimated average discharge in the river varies widely from a minimum of 59 cubic feet (1.7 m^{3}) per second in February to a maximum of 2,490 cubic feet (71 m^{3}) per second in August.

The river, the recreation area on the southern shores of the Chilkoot Lake and the Lake are approached by road along the Lukat-Chilkoot River Roads, also popularly known as the 'Bear Highway', as brown bears frequent this road in search of pink and coho salmon. The Chilkoot Lake and the Chilkoot River outlet are about 10 miles (16 km) away from the town of Haines. The river stretch is popular for coho fishing during September–October, pink salmon fishing during late July and August, and fish species of chum salmon, Dolly Varden and sockeye all through the summer and fall.

== History ==
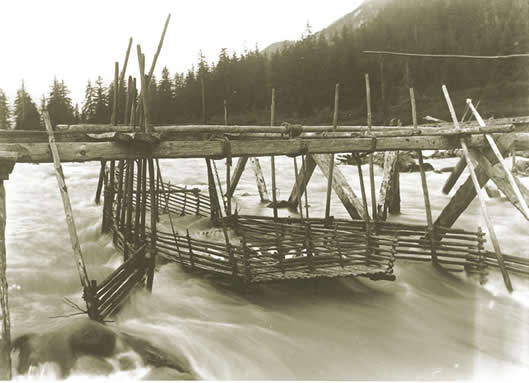
Tlingit fish trap on the Chilkoot River in 1894

The L’uknax Adi clan of Tlingit Indians, whose principal symbol is the red salmon or sockeye, traditionally owned the Chilkoot River and the Chilkoot Lake.

Another group of inhabitants of the Heines/Chilkoot River area are the Jilkoot Kwaan (Kwaan is Tlingit word meaning “to dwell”). They are a clan of the Tlingits who also owned land in the vicinity.

The history of the Chilkoot River and the Chilkoot Lake is directly linked to the Chilkoot village, where the Tlingits lived, after which the river and the lake are named. This village existed near the outlet of the Chilkoot River and was divided into two parts by the river; the western part was inhabited by Raven clan Tlingits while the Eagle Clan Tlingits lived on the eastern part. It was an important location for the southeast Alaskan Tlingits who reportedly settled here during pre-historic days when they became occupied in salmon and hooligan fishing. They used hooligan fish to make fish oil, their cooking medium, by cooking the fishes in a canoe lined with hot rocks.

Chilkoot is a Tlingit phrase which means without a storehouse. The Chilkoot band at one time stored fish packed in snow between alder or willow branches, instead of in storehouses.

The population of the village dwindled over the years from a figure of 127 people (in 1880 census), just to 2 houses with 7 people in June 1990, and was finally abandoned. Another factor for desertion of the village is attributed to the cannery industries that got established in the area for processing salmons that were fished from the river and the lake, in Haines and other places in the late 19th and early 20th century; the last Tlingit reportedly left the place in the early 1940s and most of the families now live in Haines. The fishing tools that the Tlingits used for fishing in the river and the lake in the past, which were mostly nets and gaff hooks, have also since been replaced with modern fishing rods and reels.

The biologists of Alaska Department of Fish and Game (ADF&G) constructed a fishing weir across the Lower Chilkoot River in 1976 to enumerate the movement of Sockeye fishes from the Chilkoot lake downstream.

The road from the Lynn Canal to the outlet of the lake was extended and improved over a period from 1953 to 1956 by the Alaska Road Commission; the intended purpose was to have access to the recreation area for quality fishing and access to small boats to the river shores for extracting timber from the area for commercial purposes. The road on the upstream side of the lake known as 'Cox Road' (named after a homestead owner in the upper reach of the river) on the west side of the lake was built in 1968.

Use of boats on the Chilkoot River and the lake from the Tlingit village was in the form of canoes rowed to the “Glory Hole,” at the upper end of the lake for harvesting salmons and also for hunting wild life in the hills. However, in the mid 20th century boats were used to transport construction materials and to the homestead built by Cox in the upper reach of the river. Now, commercial ships operate in the lake, catering to tourism for fishing, sightseeing and for hunting expeditions.

== Aqua fauna ==
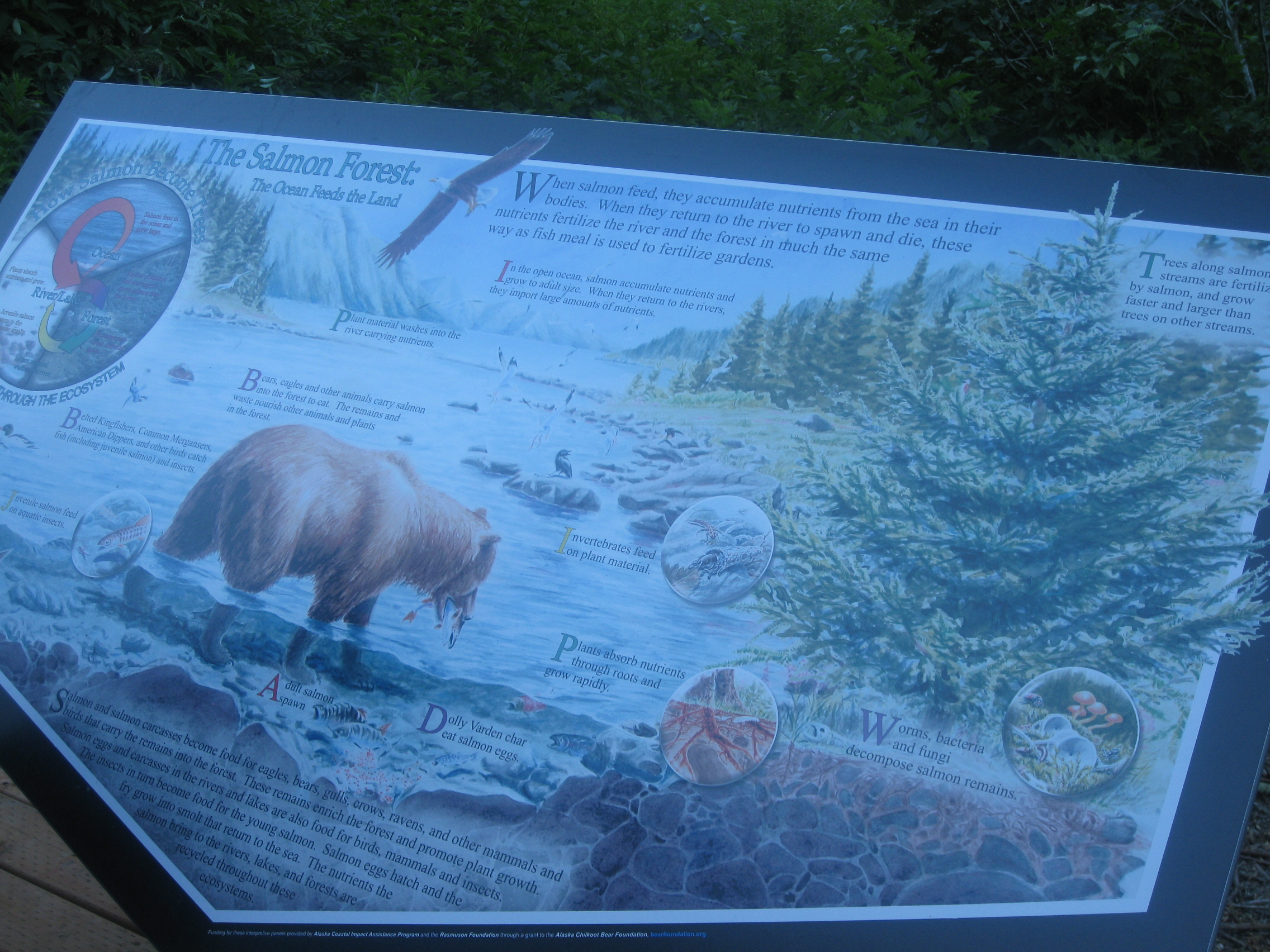
Ecology of the Salmon Forest in the Chilkoot River Corridor

The aqua fauna found in abundance in the Chilkoot River, as one approaches along the Lynn Canal and the outlet stream from the Chilkoot Lake, are Bald eagles, harbor seals, bears feeding on salmon and mountain goats on the hill slopes. The aqua fauna found in the Chilkoot River moves down from the Chilkoot Lake. These are mostly Sockeye Salmon or red salmon found in profusion. According to the studies carried out by the Alaska Department of Fish and Game, 25% spawn of sockeye is from the sensitive habitat of the upper watershed in the upper reaches of the river, above the Chilkoot Lake. These studies also indicated that anadromous fish, coho, Dolly Varden, and an occasional chum salmon were found above the Chilkoot Lake in the spawning and rearing grounds.

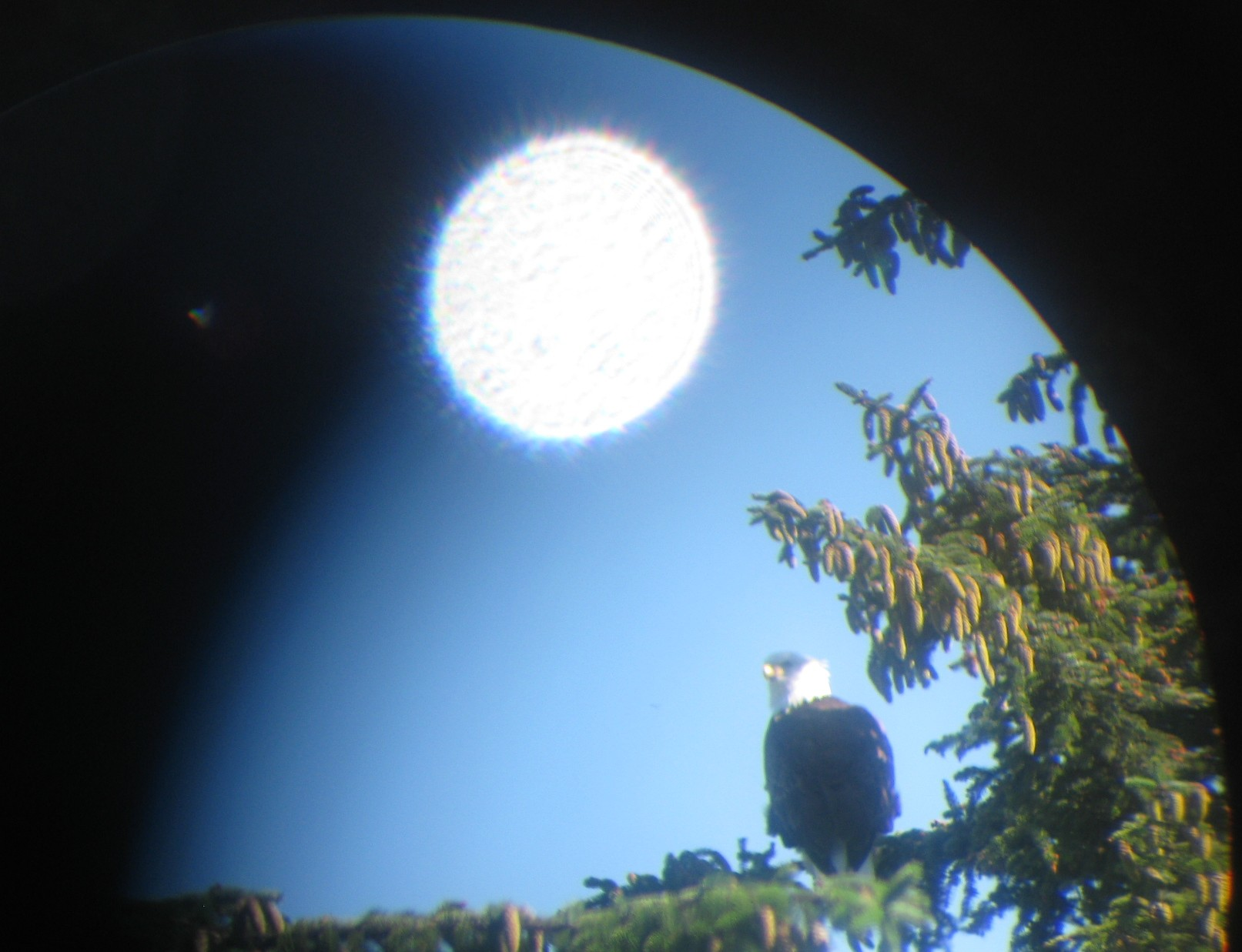
Bald eagle perched on a tree near the river, viewed through a telescope

Bald Eagles are seen on trees, on rocks and in flight, which are a popular sight during May through September. Apart from the bald eagles, Brown Bears are seen feeding in the river on salmons, mostly in spring and early summer. A plaque displayed on the right bank of the Chilkoot River, near the Deer Rock monument, reads 'Salmon Forest'. The importance of the ecosystem has been briefly explained in this plaque highlighting the role of salmons in the food chain of eagles, bears, gulls, crows, ravens, other mammals and birds that carry it to the forests, which in turn enhance the forest and promote plant growth.

Fishing tools and tackles

The aqua fauna found in the Chilkoot River are caught by the Tlingit Alaskan tribes by using long-handled scoop nets known as go qtc (gukwC), which is 18 inches (46 cm) wide at the mouth and 10 feet (3.0 m) deep. Fireweed fiber, also called nettle or sinew, is wound round this device and the mesh is formed by tying it with mesh sticks with a double strand cord. A pole with two extended arms is used to hang the net, and as hung, it forms a quadrangular shape. The net is then immersed right up to the bed of the river from the bow end of the canoe (when its broadside drifts along the flow). The net is then drawn up swiftly against the current and with a quick turn of the wrist the contents are tipped into the boat. Semi conical baskets made of spruce rods are used in the fishing weirs built across the river to capture eulachon.

Another method adopted by the Chilkoot Tlingit for capturing salmon in the rocky shallows of the Chilkoot River was by channelizing the stream by constructing walls made of rock parallel to the river. At the upstream head of these short channels (less than 20 feet (6.1 m)) they erected a small wooden platform. A single man would then stand on the platform and using a gaft hook capture the salmon fish that traveled up the artificial channel. However, in recent years modern tools of hook and rod have been widely adopted.

Fishing weir

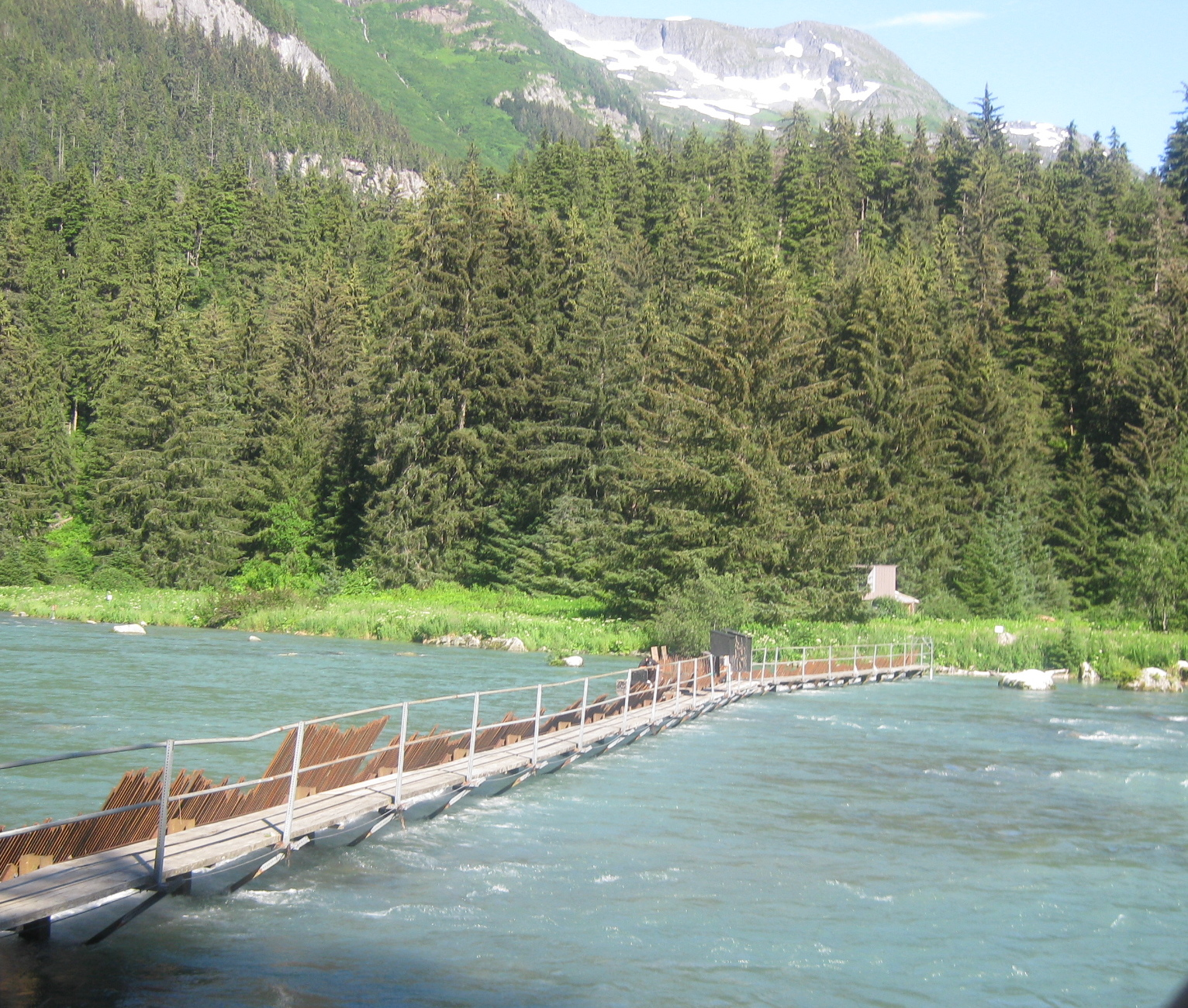
A fishing weir to enumerate the number of fishes escaping from the lake outlet

The fish species that are found in the Chilkoot River below the lake outlet are generally the sockeye salmon and Oncorhynchus nerka. In order to enumerate the salmon that pass down the river, the Alaska Department of Fish and Game, Division of Commercial Fisheries established a weir on the river, in 1976, a few hundred yards downstream from the outlet of the river from the lake, to carry out visual count of “the total sockeye escapement (postseason).” A report for the period 1996-2003 gives the counts done at the weir and also quantity estimates of the sockeye fishes.

== Chilkoot Lake State Recreation Site ==
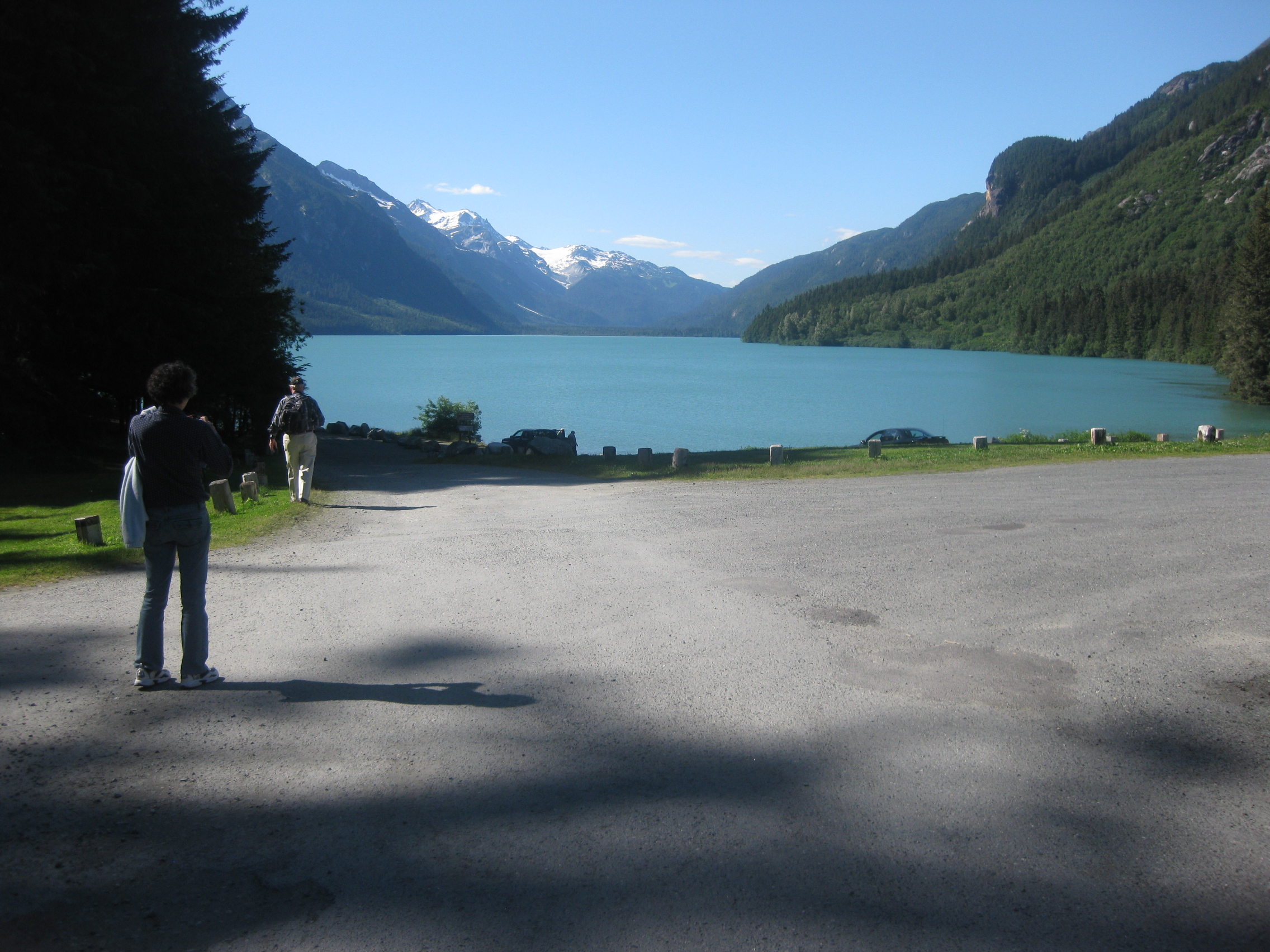
Chilkoot Lake and the camp area

Chilkoot Lake State Recreation Site was established and managed by the Alaska Department of Natural Resources; Division of Parks and Outdoor Recreation. The recreation site sits amidst a forest of Sitka trees at the head of the Chilkoot River on the southern shore of Chilkoot Lake.10 miles (16 km)) The lake is northeast of Haines following the Lutak and Chilkoot River roads, or 5 miles (8.0 km)) past the ferry terminal. The site has 80 acres (32 ha)) of land with 32 campsite, 32 picnic shelters, and a boat launch. The precincts of the river and the lake provide some of the sites for salmon fishing during mid-June and ending in mid-October when large number of brown bears frequent the river and the lake to feed on spawning salmon. Consequently, the road along the river is sometimes called the ‘bear highway’.

=== Campgrounds ===
The prehistoric Chilkoot village has been converted into a camping area developed by the State Parks and Outdoor Recreation Division of the Alaska Department of Natural Resources.

=== Other recreation ===
A popular raft race known as the “Mad Raft Race” is an annual feature in the Lower Chilkoot River starting from the Chilkoot Lake. It is held during Fourth of July celebrations observed in Haines. Homemade rafts are plied during the race due to their light weight and ease of transportation across the fishing weir.

== Preservation issues ==
Conflicts have arisen in the Chilkoot River Corridor (CRC) between humans and Alaskan brown bears, which frequent this region in large numbers during the months of August–September in search of spawning salmon. Consequently, a large number of visitors travel to the area to watch bears and bald eagles harvesting salmon along the river. To minimize human activities that disrupt the feeding bears, the Haines Chamber of Commerce, the Lynn Canal Conservation, Inc., and the Chilkoot Indian Association jointly launched the Chilkoot River Corridor Strategic Planning Project (CRC). The basic objective of this project was to develop and enact a plan for the longterm sustainable management of the existing natural, cultural, historical, and socio-economic resources of the Chilkoot River Corridor. After several meetings, the CRC has identified for action the following, as a guide to the Alaska Chilkoot Bear Foundation to act upon:

Management issues

These issue relate to enhancing capability of the State Agency to Manage Recreational Use, create a self-help program for the visitors to avoid interference; minimize use of overnight camping along the CRC, create more spacious parking space and avoid incidence of damage to the lake from use of motorized transport; minimize, respect and preserve Chilkoot Historical Resources; launch 'Public Awareness Programs' of the cultural significance of the area and help existence of the Chilkoot Culture Camp.

Wildlife issues

Wildlife issues of concern are: avoidance of ‘Human-Wildlife Conflicts’ by monitoring and improving visitor activity with adequate interaction; to enhance habitat and scenic values, and to ensure that exclusive corridors are maintained for the Brown Bears to access/egress their feeding areas in the Chilkoot River, totally unhampered.

Future planning

This essential planning is a continuing process to identify and interpret 'Brown Bear Habitat and Use Patterns' so that the Agency could take appropriate further development decisions.

=== Statutes ===
Considering the large number of visitors recorded in recent years to visit the Chilkoot River Corridor and which has generated large commercial operations, a working Group of the 'Stake Holders' formulated guidelines for use of the River Corridor. These guidelines have been published in the form of 'Statutes and Regulations' made applicable throughout the state of Alaska including the Chilkoot River Corridor. These Acts relate to the Feeding of Bears under “Act 5AAC 92.230” with exceptions to trapping of wild Black Bears under “Act 5AAC 84-AAC92”, and Harassment of Wild Life under “Alaska Statute 16.05.920” with exception under Act 5AAC 92.440 with regard to “Taking game in defense of life and property”. A plaque has been displayed at the visitor center on the right bank of the Chilkoot River near the heritage monument of the Tlingits, the “Deer Rock.” A summary of the statute regulations is recorded as:

Your actions should not create a situation where bears are attracted to your activities and they should not obtain fish or food from you. Attracting a bear for any purpose (including photography and viewing) will not be tolerated nor will a user be justified in driving off a bear that has been attracted by improperly stored food, fish or garbage. Bears should be allowed to use and feed at Chilkoot River without interference from you. Fire arms shall only be used for self-defense and legal hunting; they shall not be discharged just to frighten bears from the area.

== See also ==
- List of rivers of Alaska
- Chilkoot Lake
- Deer Rock

== Gallery ==
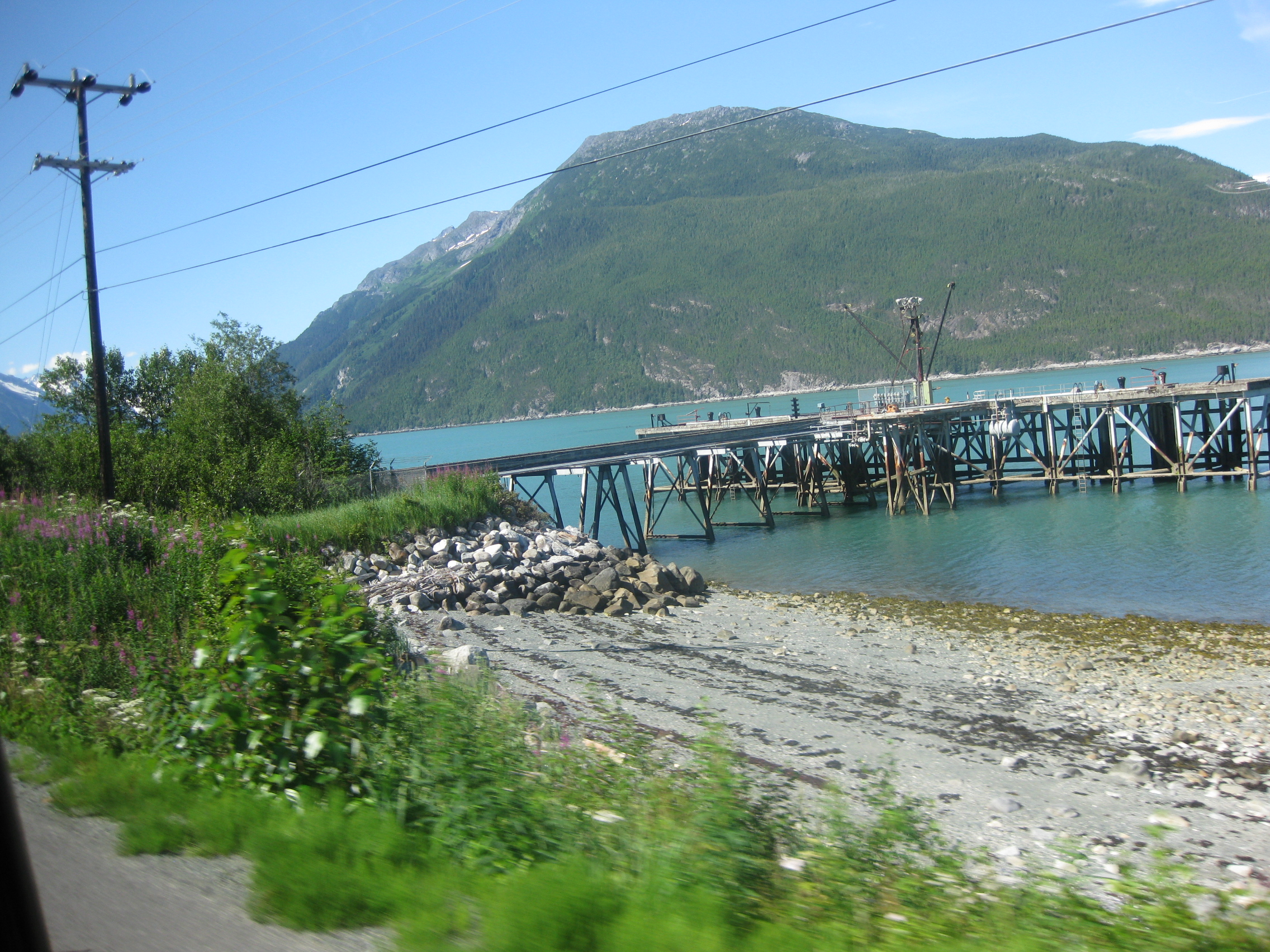
Chilkoot Inlet and the harbour

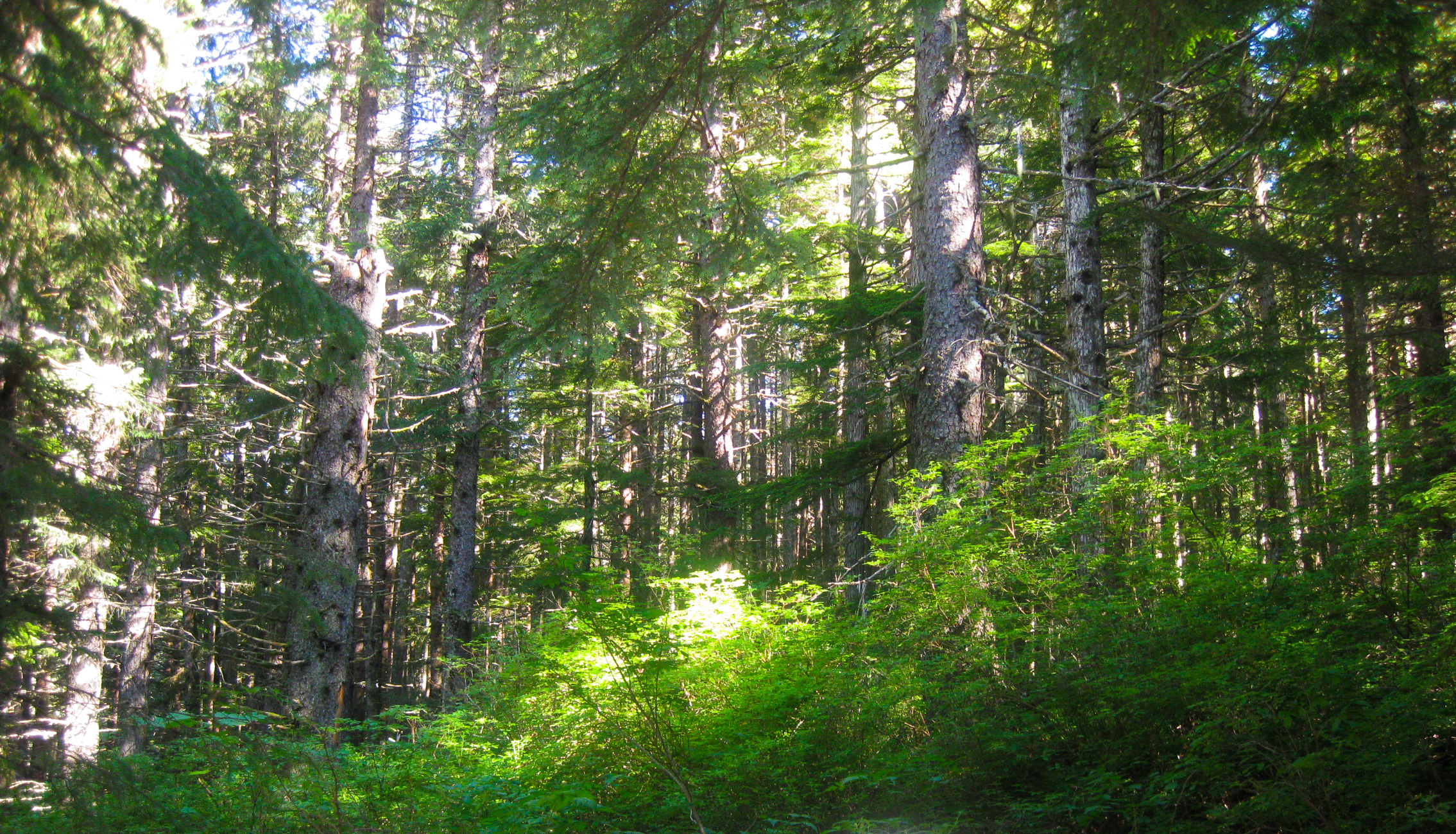
Chilkoot catchment covered with rain forests

== Bibliography ==
- "Navigability of the Chilkoot Lake and the Chilkoot River" (PDF). United States Department of the Interior. Archived from the original (PDF) on September 30, 2009.
