= Chilkoot Lake =

Lake in Alaska, United States

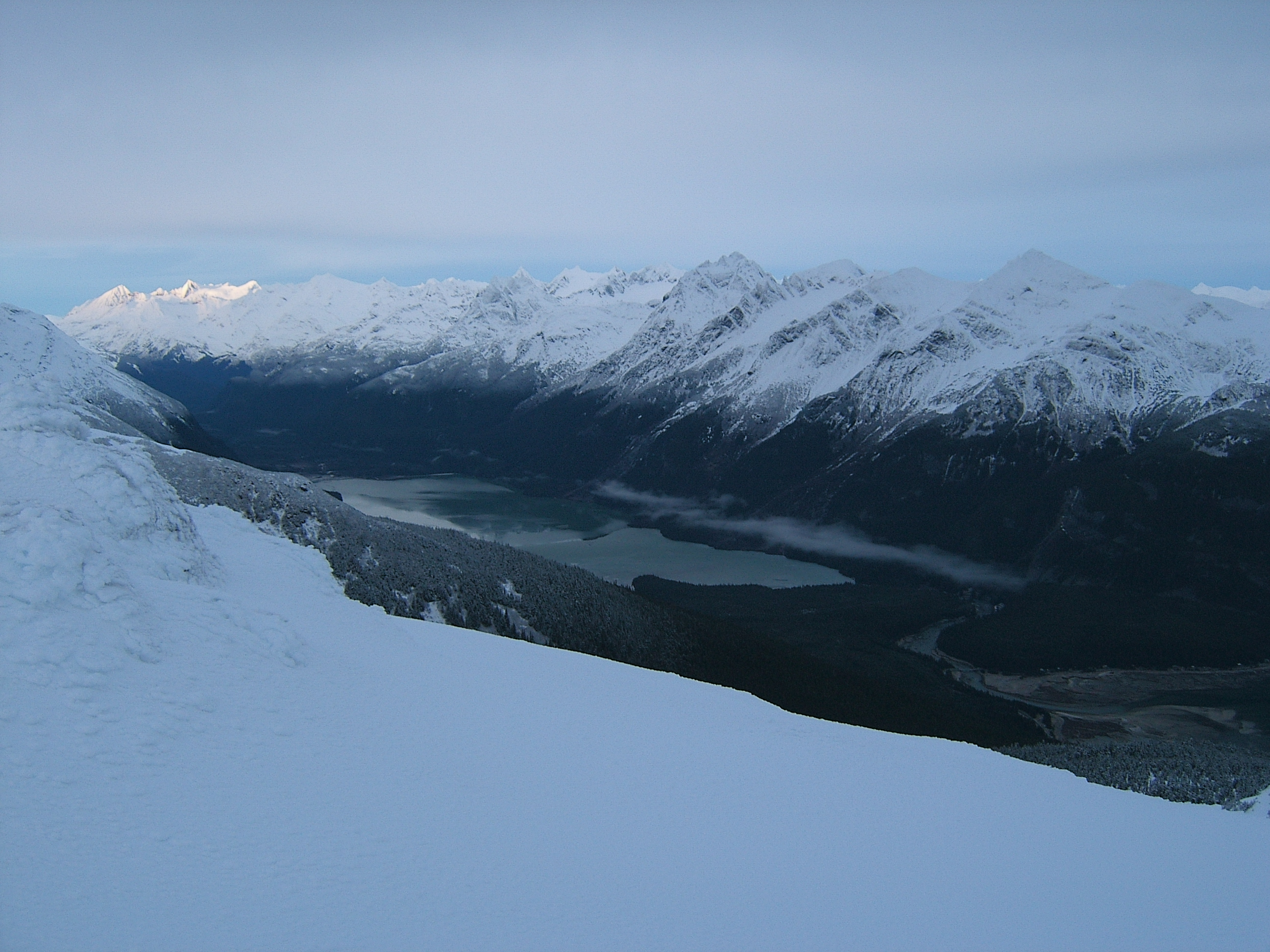
- Looking up the Chilkoot River valley and at Chilkoot Lake from the Takshanuk Mountains

- Location within Alaska Location within North America
- Location: Haines Borough, Alaska, United States
- Coordinates: 59°21′11″N 135°35′38″W
- Primary inflows: Chilkoot River
- Primary outflows: Chilkoot River
- Basin countries: United States
- Max. length: 3.6 miles (6 km)
- Surface elevation: 30 feet (9 m)

The Chilkoot Lake is a lake in the Tlingit region of Alaska in Haines Borough. The lake has a recreation site at its southern shore near the outlet to the Chilkoot River, which is set amidst the Sitka spruce trees. Chilkoot River flows from the lake for a short length and debouches into the Lutak Channel at the head of the Chilkoot inlet near Haines.

Chilkoot village, a settlement of Chilkoot Indians existed at the outlet of the lake, which was called Tschilkut or Tananel or Chilcoot; the lake is named after these people. This village is now a camping area developed by the State Parks and Outdoor Recreation Division of the Alaska Department of Natural Resources. The lake is a popular location for Kayaking.

The Lake, approached from the park area, offers one of the best red salmon fishing locations in Southeast Alaska. Salmon fishing in the lake during the spawning period is done in four runs starting with mid-June and ending in mid-October when it is also the time for Bears to frequent the lake precincts to hunt for its favorite salmons. The Chilkoot Lake's commercial fishing of Sockeye salmon is worth about $1 million annually.

== Name ==
Chilkoot Lake is also spelt Chilcoot Lake. Its other local names are the Akha Lake and Tschilkut S(ee), meaning "Chilkoot Lake" in the Tlingit language. The lake was named for the Chilkoot Tlingit. Chilkoot also means "big fish".

== Topography ==
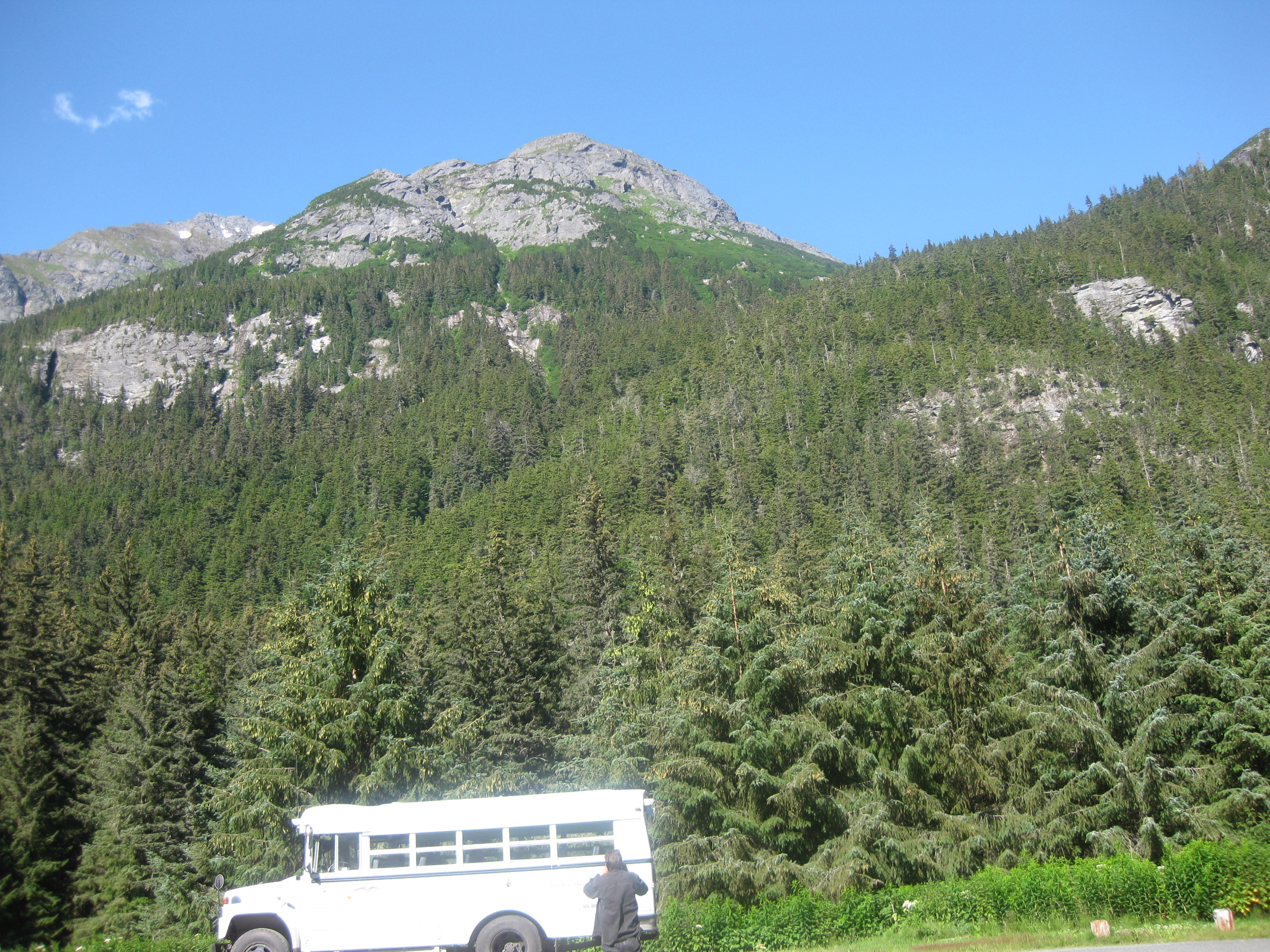
Mountains surrounding the lake

The Chilkoot Lake is marked on the quadrant map of the Skagway B 2 USGS in the Heines County at an altitude of 30 feet (9 m). The lake is about 3.6 miles (6 km) long, and about 1 mile (2 km) in width and maximum depth of water in the lake is about 300 feet (90 m). It is located at the foot of the Takshanuk Mountains to the west and the Freebee glacier and unnamed mountains to the east. It has been declared as navigable. The lake is in the upper part of the Chilkoot Watershed that spans 100 square miles (260 km^{2}) of land 20 miles (32 km) in length and 5 miles (8.0 km) in width. The waters of the lake display turquoise color. The lake is surrounded by mountains and is glacial fed. The lake is deep water body with maximum depth of 300 feet (91 m). The 1,600 acres (6.5 km^{2}) of land around the lake is mostly under the control of the State. The Upper reach of the river from its mouth at the lake up to the glacier head is about 16 miles (26 km) and the land is with the State. The lake area is generally windy.

The Upper Chilkoot River originates from a glacier and flows in southeasterly direction for 16 miles (26 km). As a braided river, it has a bed slope of 1% in the first 5 miles (8.0 km) stretch from the lake and about 2% in the balance reach of the river. The river is blocked with debris, rifles, log jams and boulders. Hence, the upper reach of the river is not navigable. The upstream reaches of the Chilkoot River and all other streams which flow into the lake are barred for fishing. Canoes are the best form of boating facility for fishing on the lake as the shore line is considered difficult.

The Lower reach of the Chilkoot River below the outlet from the Chilkoot Lake is about 1.5 miles (2 km) long (a figure of 1 mile (2 km) is also mentioned in some old records) up to Lutak Inlet, about 75 yards (70 m) wide and2 feet (0.6 m) deep on an average. It is navigable up to about 0.5 miles (0.8 km) upstream of the Lutak Inlet extending to the fish and game weir site (established by the Department of Fish and Game to enumerate the fishes), when under the influence of tides. The river in its first 1/8 mi (200 m) has formed a pool, and then flows through a number of rapids strewn with boulders in some stretches and the remaining part is flat but with rocky bed. The estimated average discharge in the river varies widely from a minimum of 59 cubic feet (2 m^{3}) per second in February to a maximum of 2,490 cubic feet (70 m^{3}) per second in August.

As the lake thaws during April and May, when fishing for Dolly Varden and sockeye salmon is common.

The lake and the recreation area on the southern shores of the lake are approached by road along the Lukat-Chilkot River Roads (also popularly known as Bear Highway as brown bears frequent this road in search of salmon) only up to the southern shores of the Lake. The lake is 10 miles (20 km) away from the town of Heines.

However, building of any new or additional structures and/or road above the Chilkoot Lake has been banned to prevent any harmful effects that may be caused due to the road access, garbage and sewage disposal as that would jeopardize the sensitive salmon spawning grounds in the lake watershed. The Chilkoot Watershed Coalition monitors this closely to prevent any such development. A healthy upper watershed 5 by 1.5 miles (8 by 2 km) covers the Chilkoot Lake is considered essential to propagate sockeye, coho, hooligan, bears, moose and many other species of wild life.

== History ==
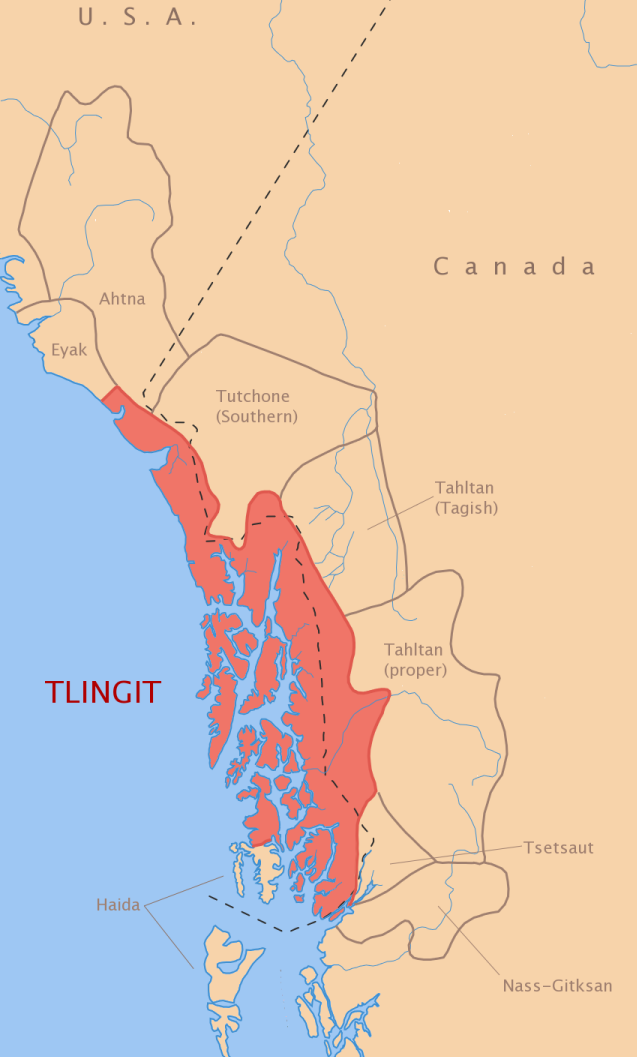
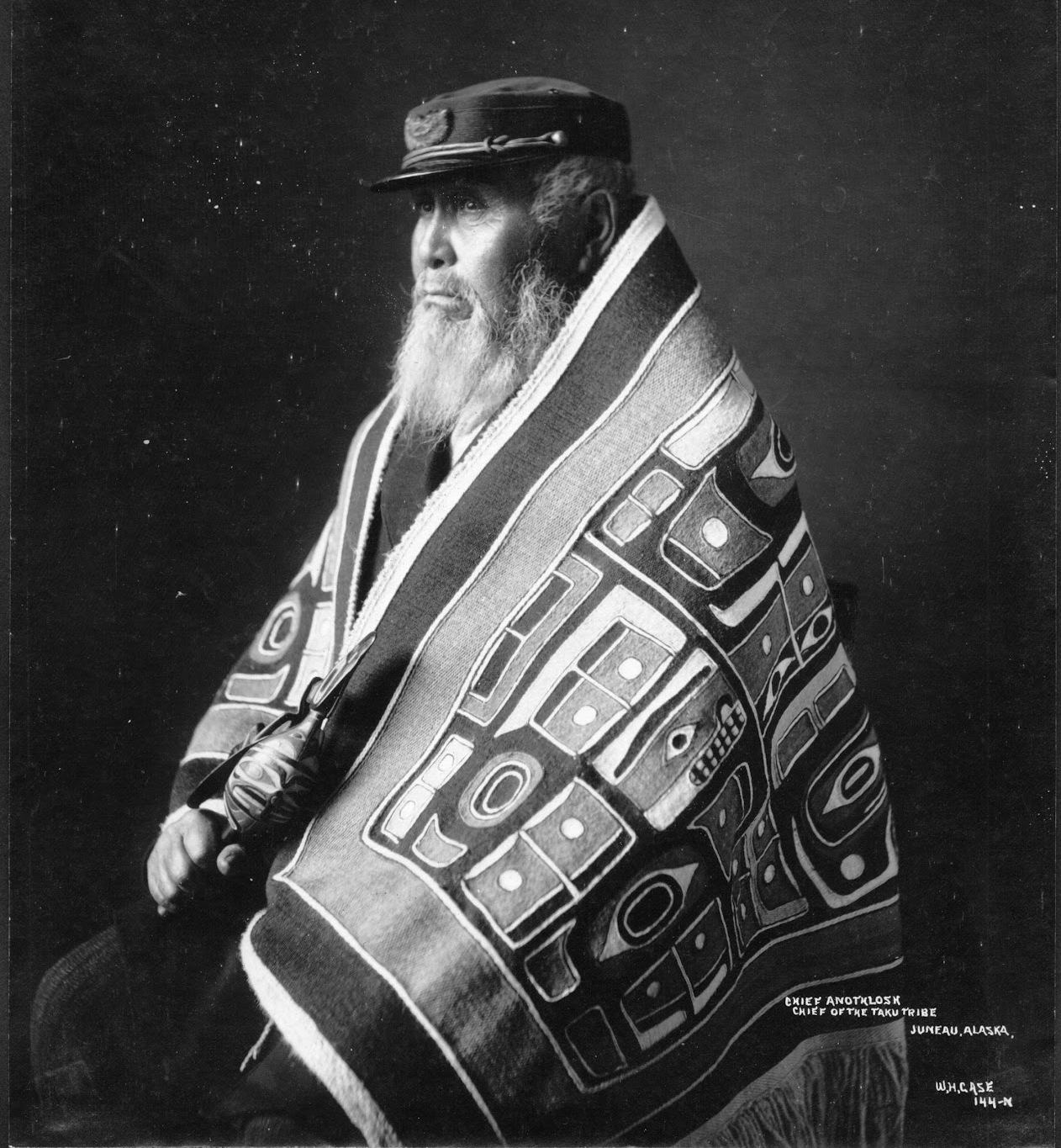
Left: Tlingit Tribal territory. Right: A Tlingit leader.

L’uknax Adi clan of Tlingit Indians, whose principal symbol is red salmon or sockeye, traditionally owned Chilkoot Lake and Chilkoot river, also called by the English names after their crest animal as Sockeye Clan, Coho Clan and Salmon Clan. Tlingit clans "historically owned areas of economic production that were most often also places of importance in the Spiritual geography of the region".

The history of the lake is directly linked to the Chilkoot village, where the Tlingits lived, after which the lake has been named. This village existed near the outlet of the Chilkoot Lake and was divided into two parts by the river; the western part was inhabited by Raven clan Tlingits while the Eagle Clan Tlingits lived on the eastern part. It was an important location for the southeast Alaskan Tlingits who reportedly settled here during pre-historic days when they subsisted on salmon and hooligan fishing; they used Hooligan fish to make fish oil, their cooking medium, by cooking the fishes in a canoe lined with hot rocks.

Chilkoot is a Tlingit phrase which means without a storehouse. The Chilkoot band at one time stored fish packed in snow between alder or willow branches, instead of in storehouses.

The population of the village dwindled over the years from a figure of 127 people (1880 census), just to 2 houses with 7 people in June 1990 and was finally abandoned. Another factor for desertion of the village is attributed to the cannery industries that got established in the area for processing salmons that were fished from the lake and the river, in Haines and other places in the late 19th and early 20th century; the last Tlingit reportedly left the place in the early 1940s and most of the families now live in Haines. The fishing tools that the Tlingits used for fishing in the lake and the rivers in the past, which were mostly nets and gaff hooks, have also since been replaced with modern fishing rods and reels.

The biologists of Alaska Department of Fish and Game (ADF&G) constructed a fish weir across the Lower Chilkoot River in 1976 to enumerate the movement of Sockeye fishes from the Chilkoot lake downstream.

The road from the Lutak Inlet to the outlet of the lake was extended and improved over a period from 1953 to 1956 by the Alaska Road Commission; the intended purpose was to have access to the recreation area, for quality fishing and access to small boats to the river shores for extracting timber from the area for commercial purposes.

The road on the upstream side of the lake called as 'Cox Road' (named after a homestead owner in upper reach of the river) on the west side of the lake was built in later years in 1968.

Use of boats on the Chilkoot Lake and the river from the Tilgit village was in the form of canoes rowed to the "Glory Hole", at the upper end of the lake for harvesting salmons and also for hunting wild life in the hills. However, in the mid 20th century boats were used on the lake to transport construction materials and jeep to the homestead built by Cox at the head of the lake. Now, commercial ships operate in the lake catering to tourism for fishing, sight seeing and for hunting expeditions. Commercial Kayak operations are also very popular.

A popular raft race, known as the "Mad Raft Race" is an annual feature in the Lower Chilkoot River from the Chilkoot Lake, which is held during Fourth of July celebrations. Home-made rafts are plied during the race due its light weight and ease of transportation across the fish weir on the river to continue with the race.

== Fauna ==
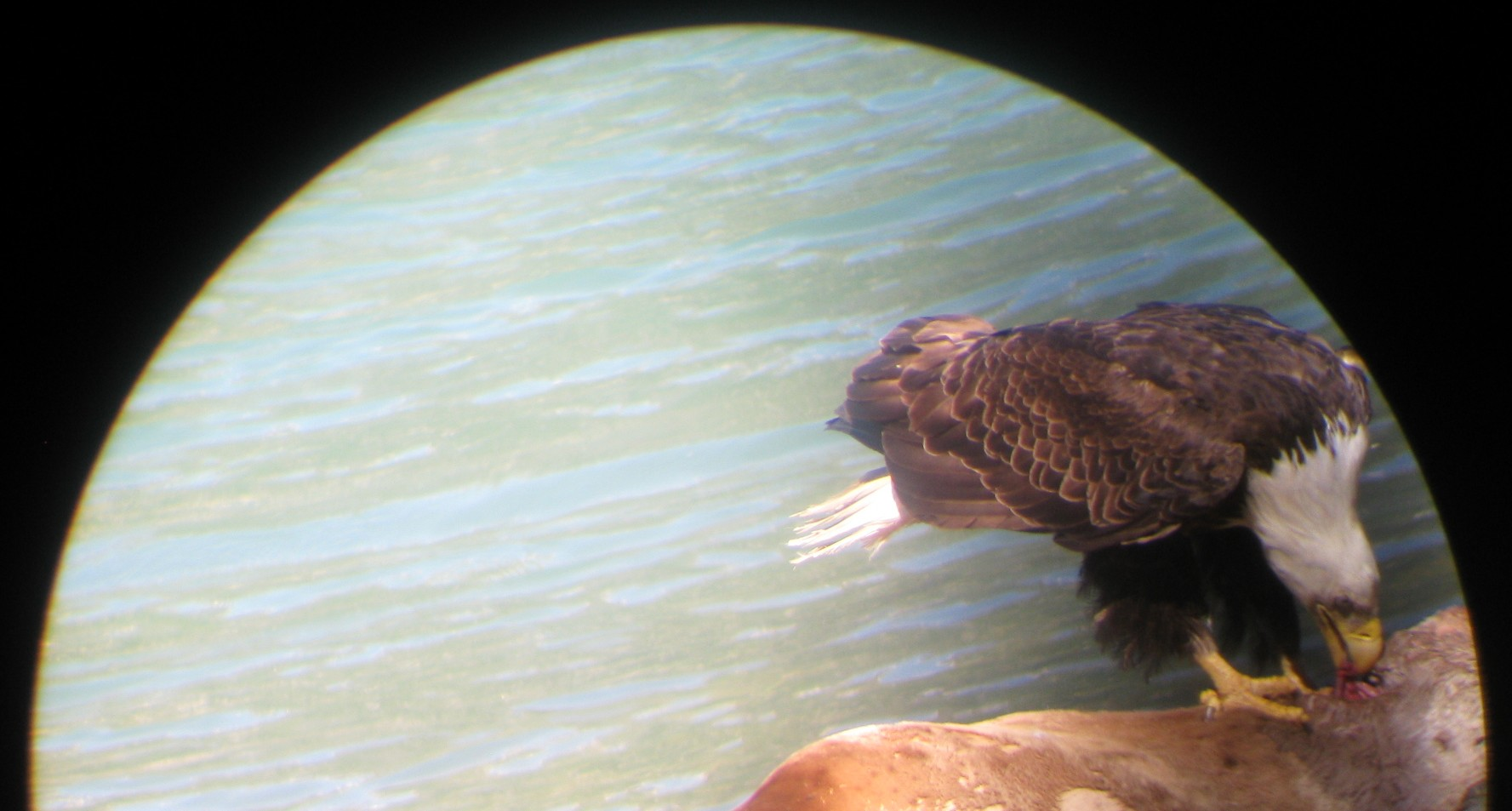
Left: a sketch of red sockeye salmon. Right: bald eagle viewed through a telescope near the Chilkoot Lake camp site feeding on a seal carcass.

The aqua fauna found in the Chilkoot Lake moves down the Chilkoot River. These are mostly Sockeye Salmon or red salmon found in profusion. The lake proliferates in red fish in large numbers and are easily caught. In 1896, the fish run was so large that the cannery, which processed this fish variety had to put a ceiling on the number of fishes that they would accept from Indian fishermen at 100 per day. It has been reported that the Indians fish in the lake indiscriminately even in the spawning areas of the streams flowing into the lake and place traps (gill-net) under expert guidance for the purpose without observing the specified weekly norm for closing. While scouting the lake area for locating hatcheries, it was observed that spawning beds were located at the head of the lake. Some were sighted on the shores and two streams, where gravity flow could be created and could be used for locating hatcheries. At the head of the lake, there were springs which formed a pool of about 125 feet (40 m) diameter, considered a good location for spawning of red salmons. The clear water from the springs was found to be colder than the lake water but these did not provide good conditions for locating a hatchery. According to the studies carried out by the Alaska Department of Fish and Game, 25% spawn of sockeye is from the sensitive habitat of the upper watershed above the Chilkoot Lake. These studies also indicated that anadromous fish, coho, Dolly Varden, and an occasional chum salmon were found above the Chilkoot Lake in the spawning and rearing grounds.

The fauna found in abundance in the lake area, as one approaches along the Luktak Channel and the outlet stream from the lake, are Bald eagles, harbor seals, bears feeding on salmon and mountain goats on the hill slopes.

== Chilkoot Lake State Recreation Site ==
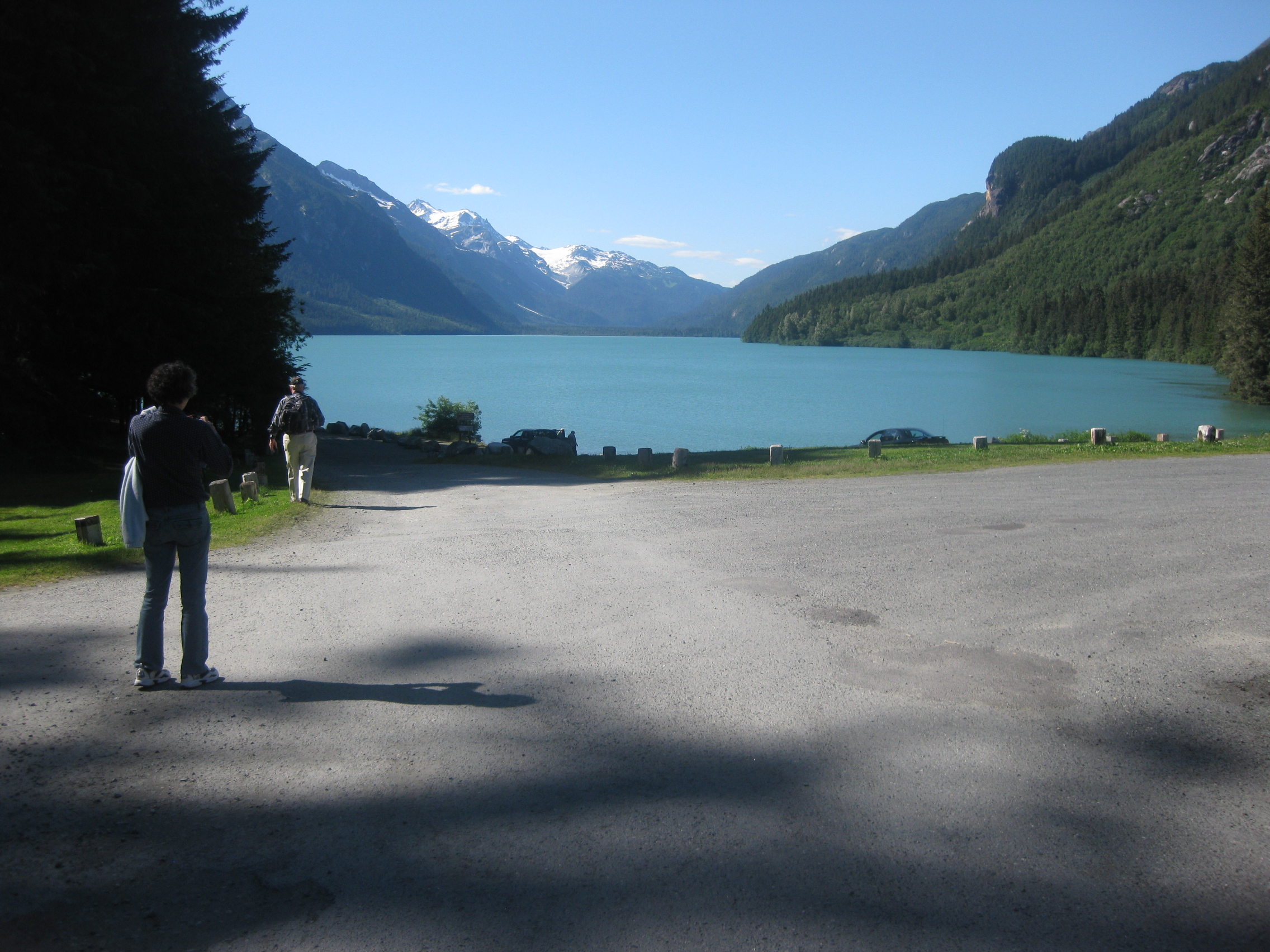
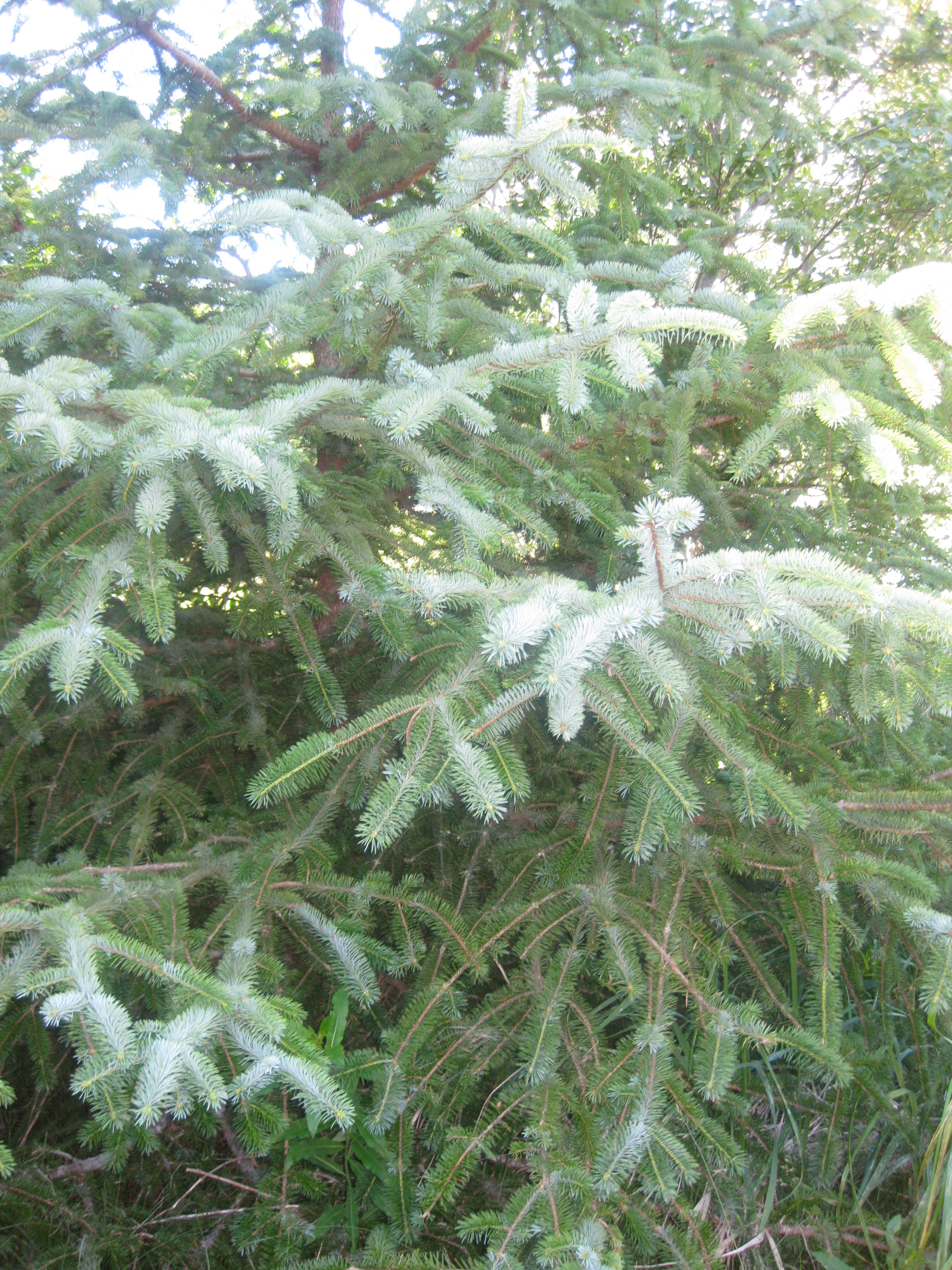
Left: Chilkoot Lake State Recreation Site. Right: Sitka trees around the lake.

The Chilkoot Lake State Recreation Site is set amidst Sitka trees at the head of the Chilkoot River on the southern shores of the Chilkoot Lake. It was established by the State Parks and Outdoor Recreation Division of the Alaska Department of Natural Resources. It is about 10 miles (20 km) northeast of Haines on the Lutak and Chilkoot River roads, or 5 miles (8 km) past the ferry terminal. The site is spread over an area of 80 acres (32 ha) and has camping grounds, picnic shelters and also a boat launching facility. The precincts of the lake and the river provide some of the best sites for salmon fishing during mid-June and ending in mid-October when large number of brown bears from the Tundra also frequent the river and the lake to capture their favorite food - the red salmon - and consequently the road here along the river is called the ‘bear highway’.

== Water sports ==
Ice skating and Kayaking are popular water sports in the lake.

Ice skating is a popular sport in the peak of winter in the Chilkoot Lake when it gets completely frozen. During winter the lake appears bowl-shaped and is surrounded by white, snow-covered mountains, tucked in a valley and is free from icy winds. The hardness of the ice in the lake is said to be "hard and shiny as a marble floor" and reflects the dark spruce trees and mountains. The ice skating in the lake is a quiet gliding experience of about 1 mile (2 km), and this experience is said to be totally unlike the skating at a rink. Apart from the lake road to the lake is also used for skiing.

Chilkoot Lake is considered a good water body for safe and peaceful kayaking, particularly for beginners in paddle kayaking (for learning the basic skills). The kayak launching post is the State Park at the southern end of the lake where facilities available are a ramp, floating dock, free parking grounds, picnic shelters and rest rooms. Kayaking offers good sights of wildlife such as bald eagles and salmon spawning. Kayaking trip around the lake takes about 5 hours. Even though a USGS map is available as guide for kayakers, the small lake does not require any help of a map for navigation. The main security precaution to be observed by kayakers is not disturb the bears, which may be seen hunting for fish on the shore line.

== Gallery ==
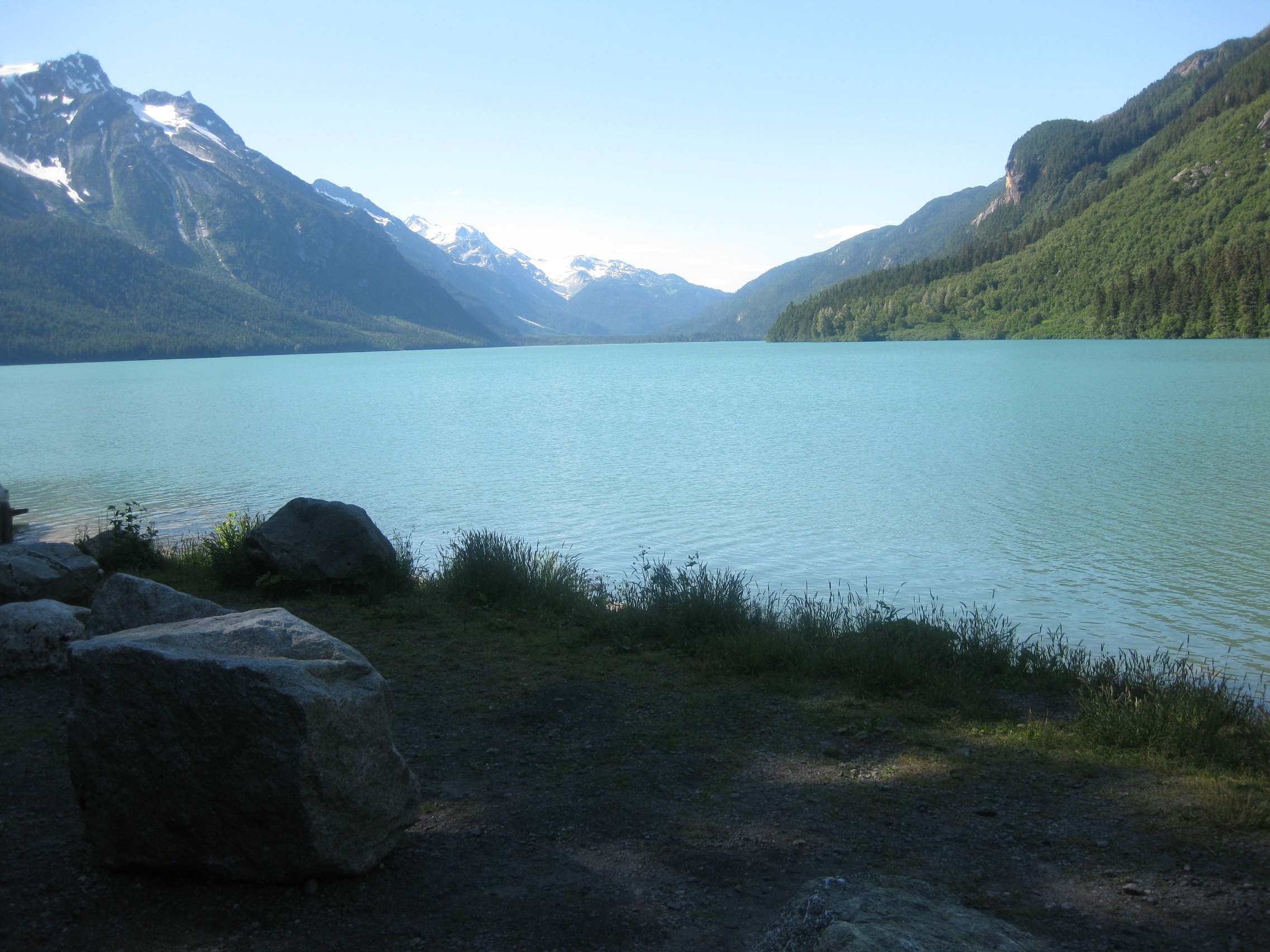
View of Chilkoot Lake

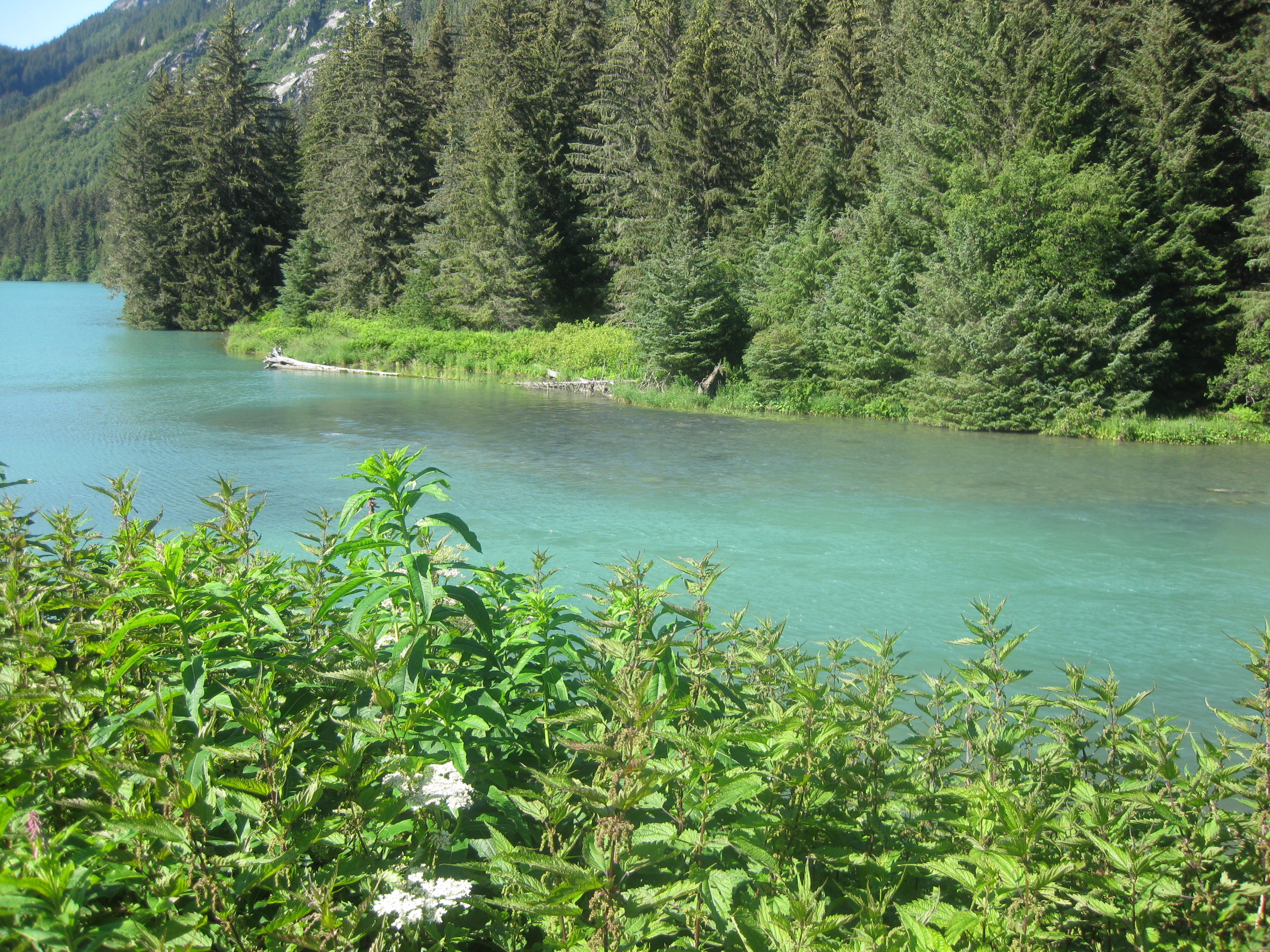
Outlet from the lake forming the Chilkoot River

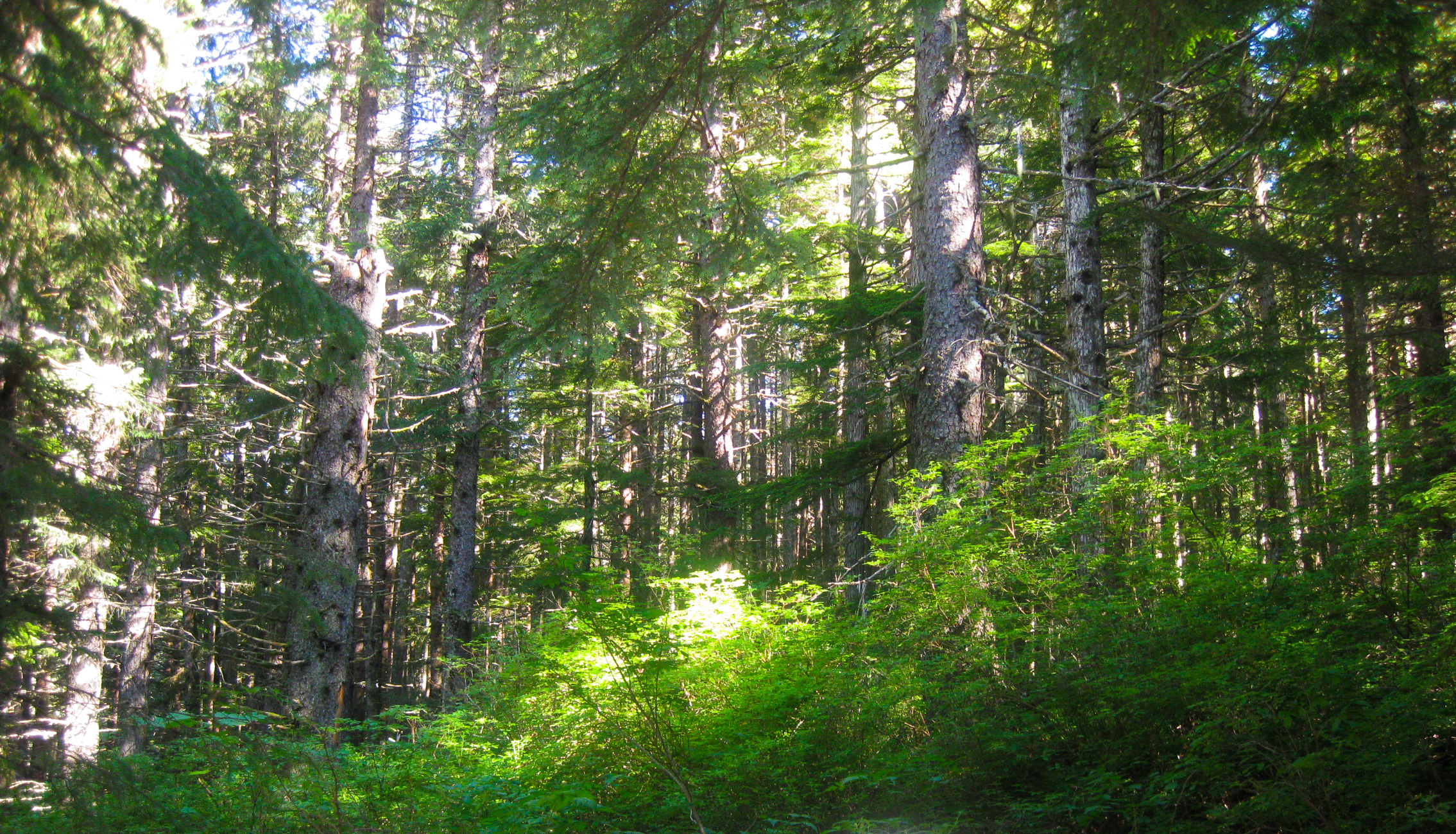
Rainforest surrounding the lake catchment

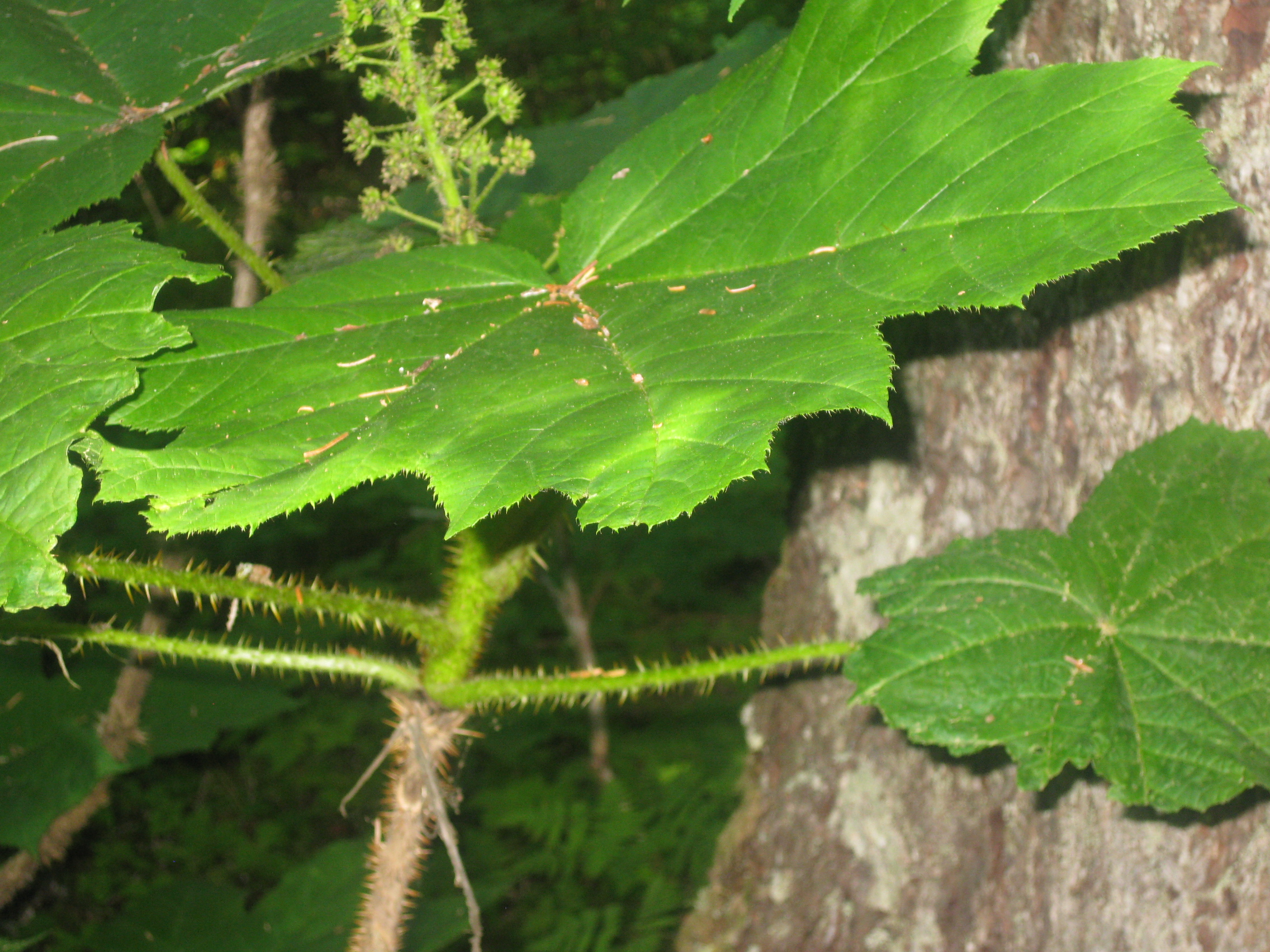
Devil's club shrub in the rain forest in the lake catchment

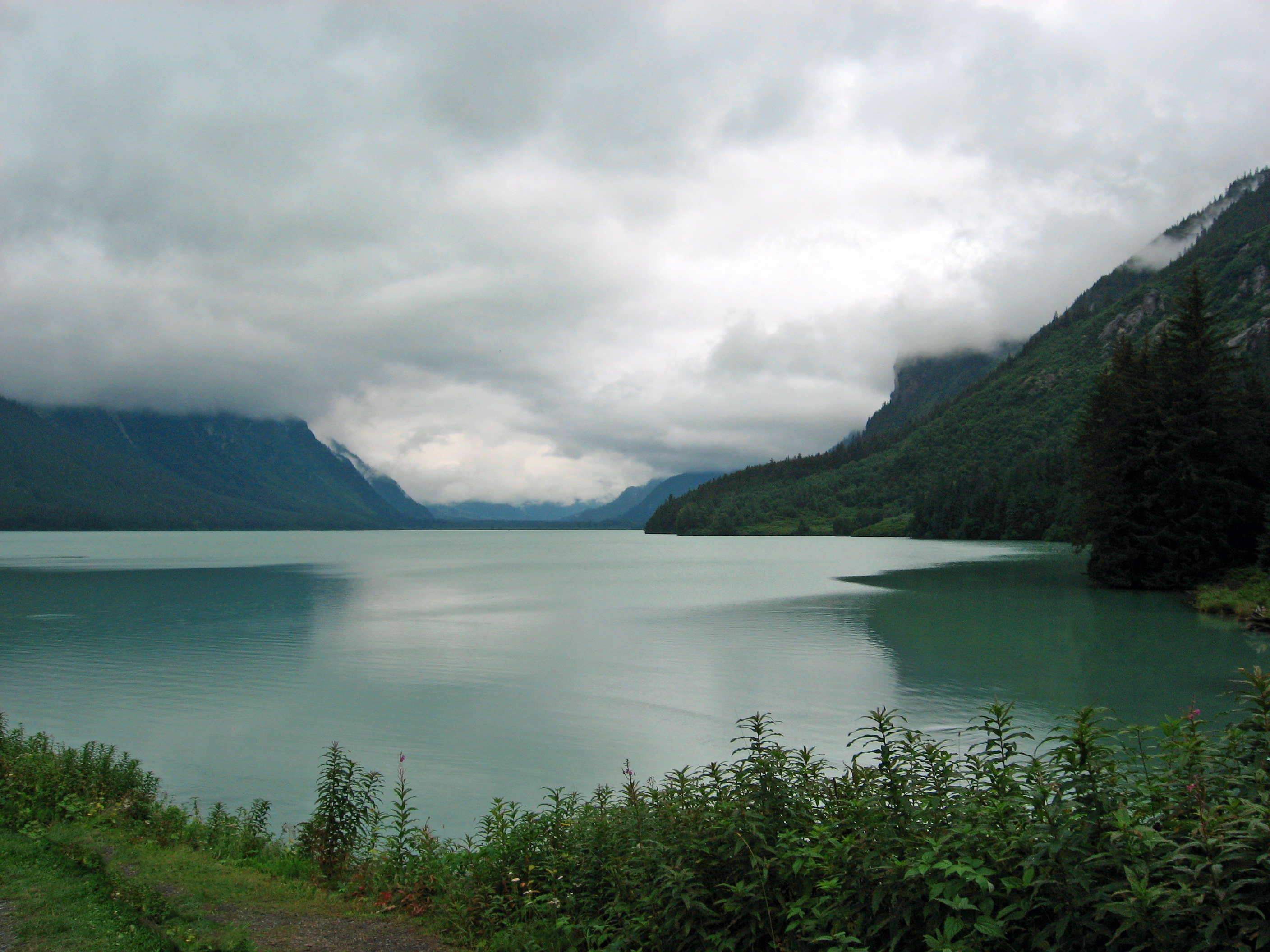
Chilkoot Lake on a cloudy day - the lake is near Haines, Alaska

== Bibliography ==
- "Navigability of the Chilkoot Lake and the Chilkoot River" (PDF). United States Department of the Interior. Archived from the original (PDF) on September 30, 2009.
