= Chilkoot Indian Association =

Alaska Native tribe

Chilkoot Indian Association (Haines) Deishú (Tlingit)
- Alaska Native village
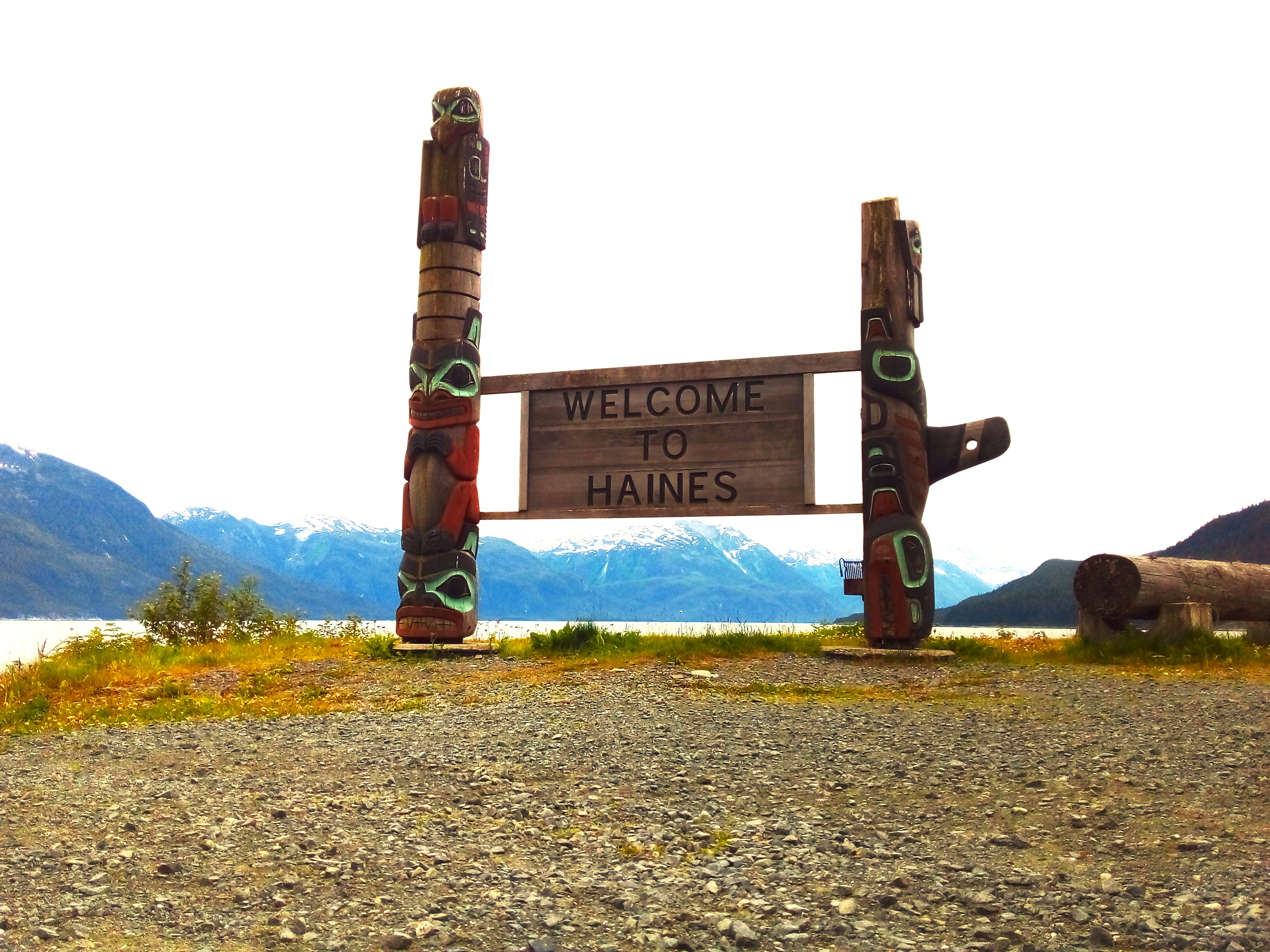
- Carved welcome poles in Haines, Alaska

- Chilkoot Indian Association
- Coordinates: 59°14′01″N 135°26′50″W
- Constitution Ratified: December 5, 1941; 84 years ago
- Capital: Haines

Government
  - Type: Representative democracy
  - Body: Chilkoot Tribal Council
  - President: James G̱ooch Éesh Hart
  - Vice President: William Thomas

Population (2003)
  - Estimate: 480
- Demonym: Tlingit
- Time zone: UTC– 09:00 (AKST)
  - Summer (DST): UTC– 08:00 (AKDT)
- Website: www.chilkoot-nsn.gov

The Chilkoot Indian Association (Haines) is a federally recognized Native American tribe in the United States of Chilkoot Tlingit people.. This Alaska Native tribe is headquartered in Haines, Alaska. Haines is called Tlingit: Deishú, which means both the beginning and end of a trial. Historically it was a trade route, particularly for hooligan oil.

The tribe had 480 citizens in 2003.

== Government ==
The Chilkoot Indian Association are led by a democratically elected tribal council. They maintain a government-to-government relationship with the United States federal government and international governments.

Their tribal administration is:

- President: James G̱ooch Éesh Hart.
- Vice President: William Thomas
- Secretary/Treasurer: Andrea Ferrin
- Council Member: Patrick Dunbar
- Council Member: Georgiana Hotch
- Council Member: Gwen Sauser
- Council Member: Kevin Thompson
- SEARHC Representative: Janice Hill

The Chilkoot Indian Association ratified their constitution and by-laws in 1941. They are served by the Alaska Regional Office of the Bureau of Indian Affairs. The tribe was not included in the Alaska Native Claims Settlement Act.

In 2002, the Harvard Kennedy School Project on Indigenous Governance and Development honors the tribe for its nation-building process begun in 1990. By 2003, the tribe provided educational, housing, and healthcare support, with an annual budget of almost $1 million.

== Communications ==
They received $2.4 million dollars to develop broadband internet through the Tribal Broadband Connectivity Program.

== Language ==
The tribe speaks English and the Chilkoot dialect of the Tlingit language. The tribe is developing a program to revitalize Tlingit.

== Economic development ==
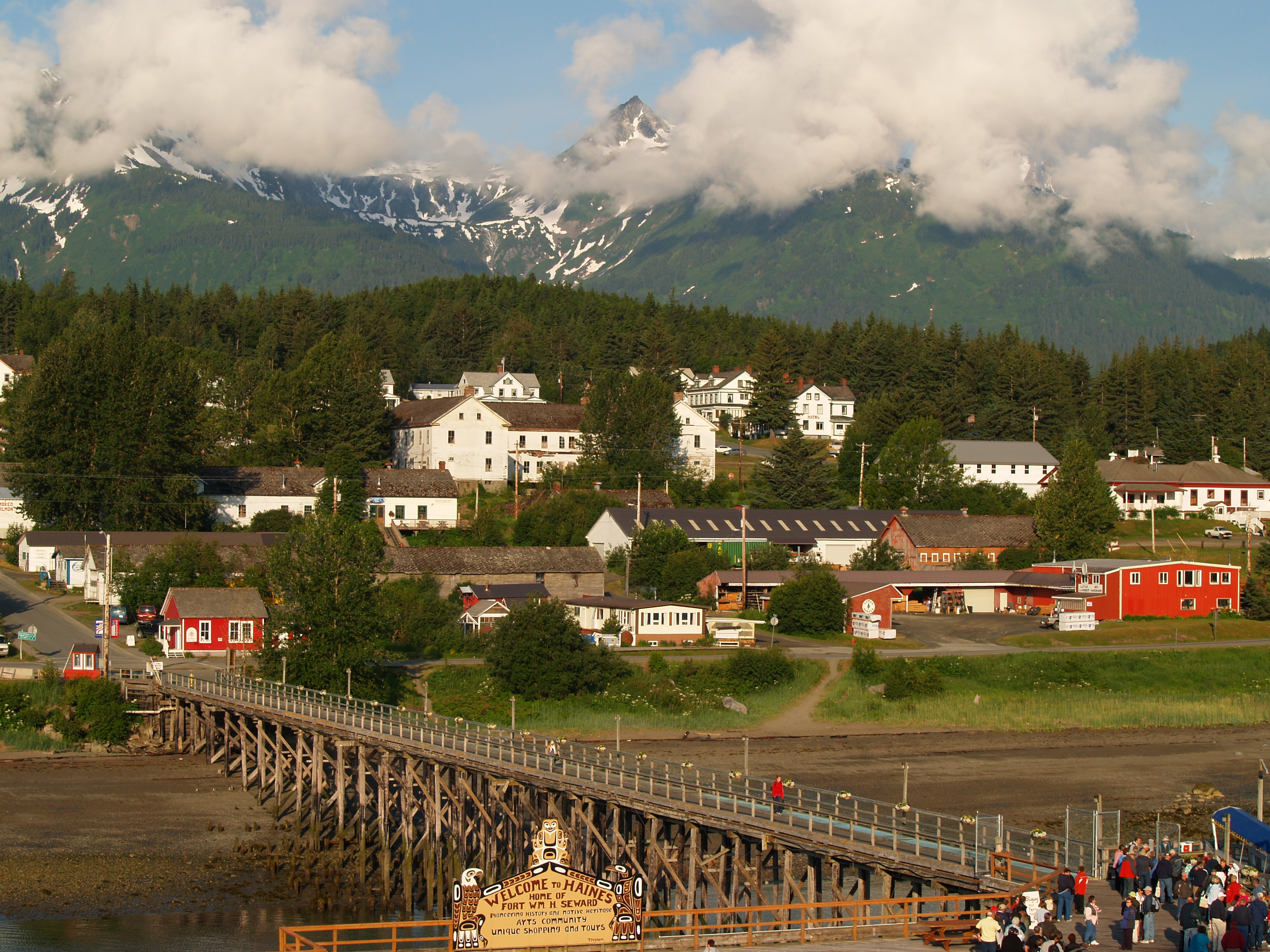
Haines, Alaska

The Chilkoot Indian Association maintains a dock on the Lynn Canal and is developing cultural tourism in a project called Discover Deishú. They own Taste of Deishú, a restaurant that showcases Tlingit artwork. The tribe also provides outdoor tours and an outdoor gear and clothing store.

== Arts and culture ==
Chilkoot Tlingit are known for Chilkat weaving and formline design. The Chilkat Dancers are a Chilkoot Tlingit performance troupe in Haines.

== Notable Chilkoot people ==
- Nathan Jackson, woodcarver, jeweler
