= Casement Glacier =

Glacier in Alaska, US

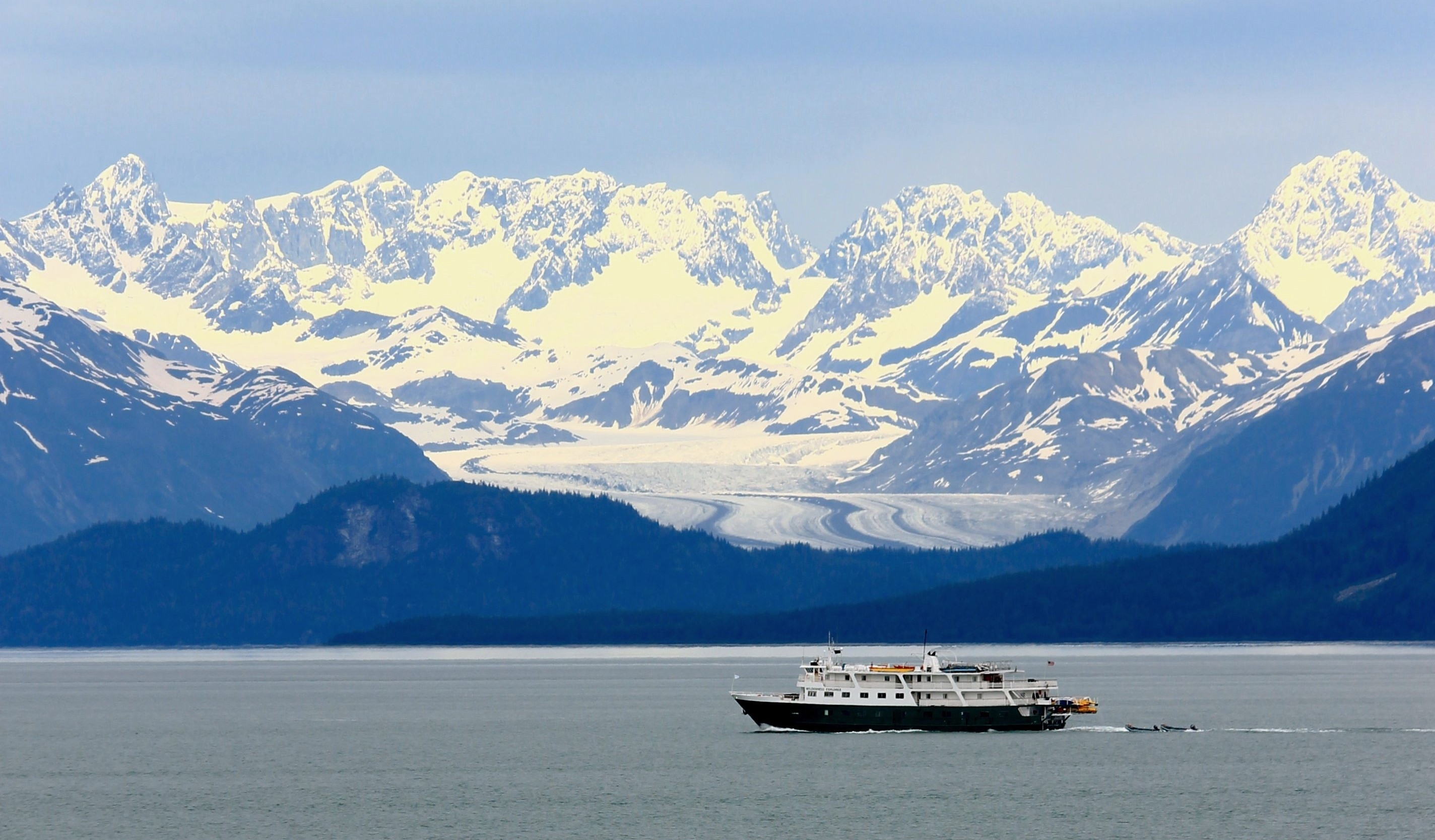
- Casement Glacier centered. (Mount Tlingit Ankawoo left, Mount Dech right)

- Location within Alaska
- Interactive map of Casement Glacier
- Type: Mountain glacier
- Location: Hoonah-Angoon Census Area, Alaska, U.S.
- Coordinates: 59°02′N 135°56′W
- Length: 14 miles (23 km)
- Terminus: Sea level
- Status: Retreating

Casement Glacier is a 14 miles (23 km) long glacier in the Glacier Bay National Park in Alaska (US). It was named in 1890 by Harry Fielding Reid in honour of R.L. Casement, member of Reid expedition on SS George W. Elder. Back then Casement Glacier was first north tributary of Muir Glacier and not yet completely detached one.

== Geography ==
The glacier has its feeding area at 1200 m altitude on the southern flank of the Takhinsha Mountains in the Alsek Ranges. There it borders the Davidson Glacier, which in contrast flows east to the Lynn Canal. The Casement glacier, with an average width of 1.8 km, flows in predominantly south-southwest direction and ends at about 300 m. The 13 km long outflow flows into the Adams Inlet, an eastern side bay of the Muir Inlet.

== See also ==
- List of glaciers
