= Muir Glacier =

Glacier in the United States

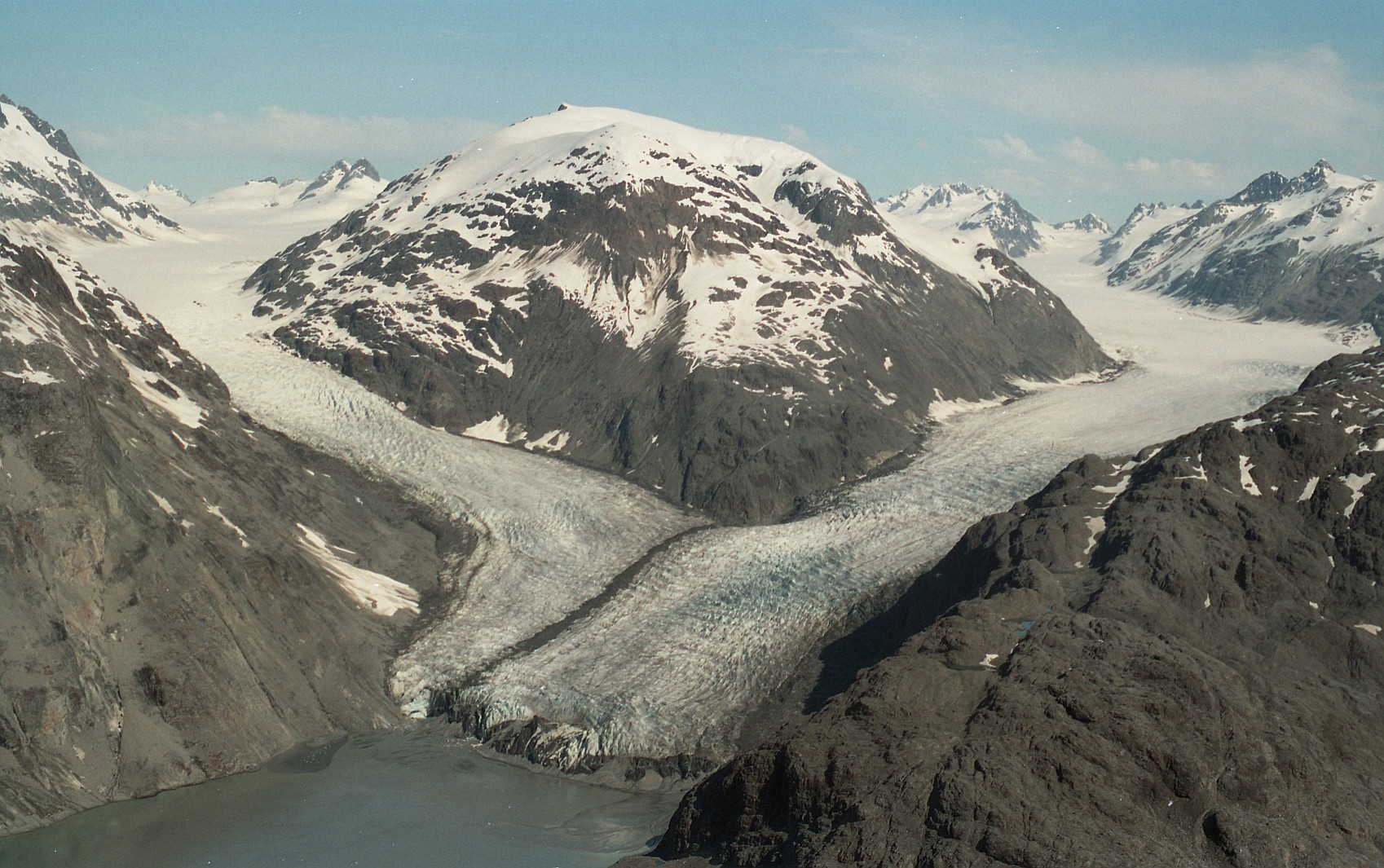

- Location within Alaska
- Type: Valley Glacier
- Location: Glacier Bay National Park, Alaska, U.S.
- Coordinates: 59°06′17″N 136°22′56″W
- Length: 11 miles (18 km)
- Terminus: Ice-contact delta
- Status: Retreating

Muir Glacier is a glacier in Glacier Bay National Park and Preserve in the U.S. state of Alaska. It is currently about 0.7 km (0.43 mi) wide at the terminus. As recently as the mid-1980s the glacier was a tidewater glacier and calved icebergs from a wall of ice 90 m (200 feet) tall.

The glacier is named after Scottish-born naturalist John Muir, who traveled around the area and wrote about it, generating interest in the local environment and in its preservation. His first two visits were in 1879 (at age 41) and 1880. During the visits, he sent an account of his visits in installments to the San Francisco Bulletin. Later, he collected and edited these installments in a book, Travels in Alaska, published in 1915, the year after he died.

== Retreat ==
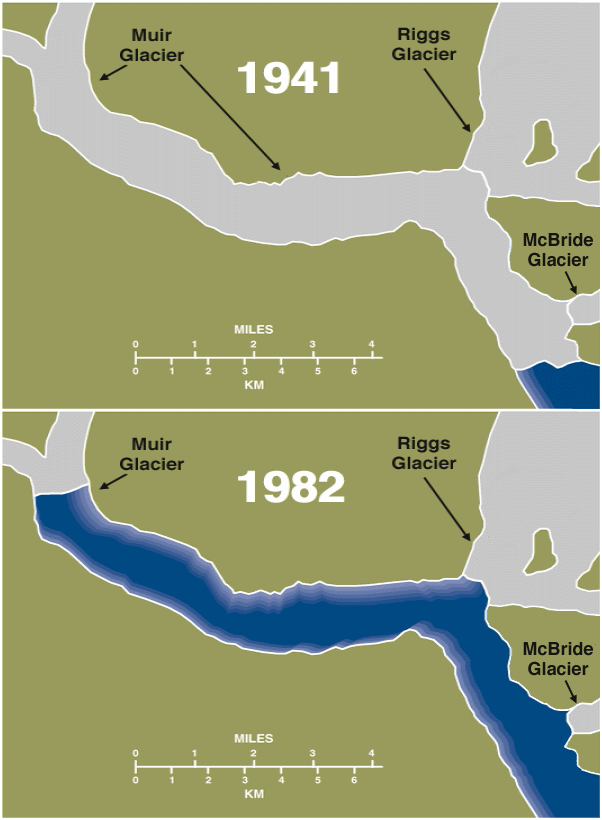
Maps showing retreat of Muir Glacier from 1941 to 1982

Muir Glacier has undergone very rapid, well-documented retreat since its Little Ice Age maximum position at the mouth of Glacier Bay around 1780. In 1794, the explorer Captain George Vancouver found that most of Glacier Bay was covered by an enormous ice sheet, some 1,200 meters (3,900 ft) in places.

In 1904 the glacier reportedly "broke through the mountains" with Pyramid Peak to the west and Mt. Wright and Mount Case to the east.

From 1892 to approximately 1980, it had retreated nearly 32 kilometers (20 mi). Between 1941 and 2004, the glacier retreated more than 12 kilometers (7.5 mi) and thinned by over 800 meters (2,600 ft). Ocean water has filled the valley replacing the ice and creating Muir Inlet.

The 1941 image shows the Muir Glacier as a tidewater glacier, prominently up to 700m thick, with its terminus visible on the lower right corner of the photo, well connected to its tributary, the Riggs Glacier, visible in the upper right part of the photo.

By 1950, the Muir Glacier had retreated by more than 3 km and had thinned by more than 100m but remained connected to the Riggs Glacier.

By 2004, the Muir Glacier had retreated further inland, and its terminus was no longer visible in the photograph. The Riggs Glacier had also undergone significant changes, retreating by 0.25 km and becoming disconnected from the Muir Glacier. Vegetation began to dominate the landscape where ice once prevailed.

== Gallery ==
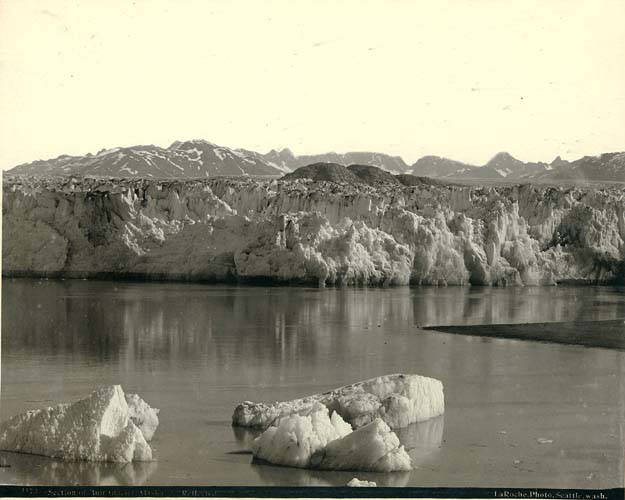
Photograph of Muir Glacier by Frank La Roche, c. 1897

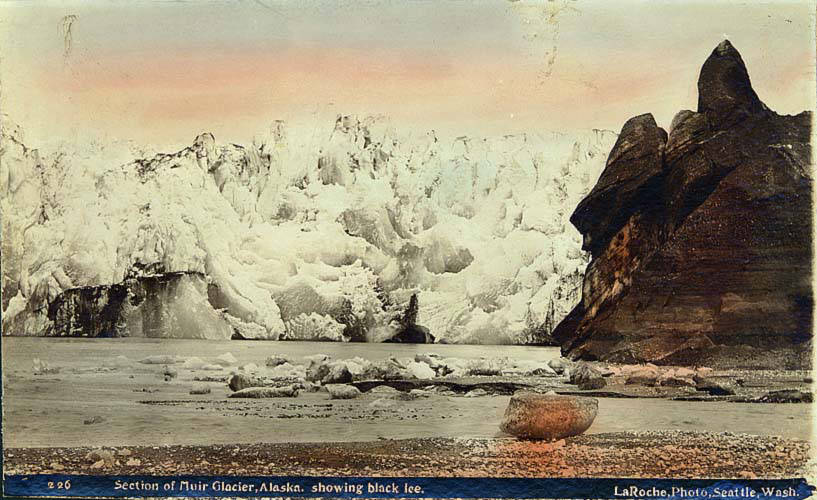
Another La Roche photo of the glacier, this one showing "black ice"

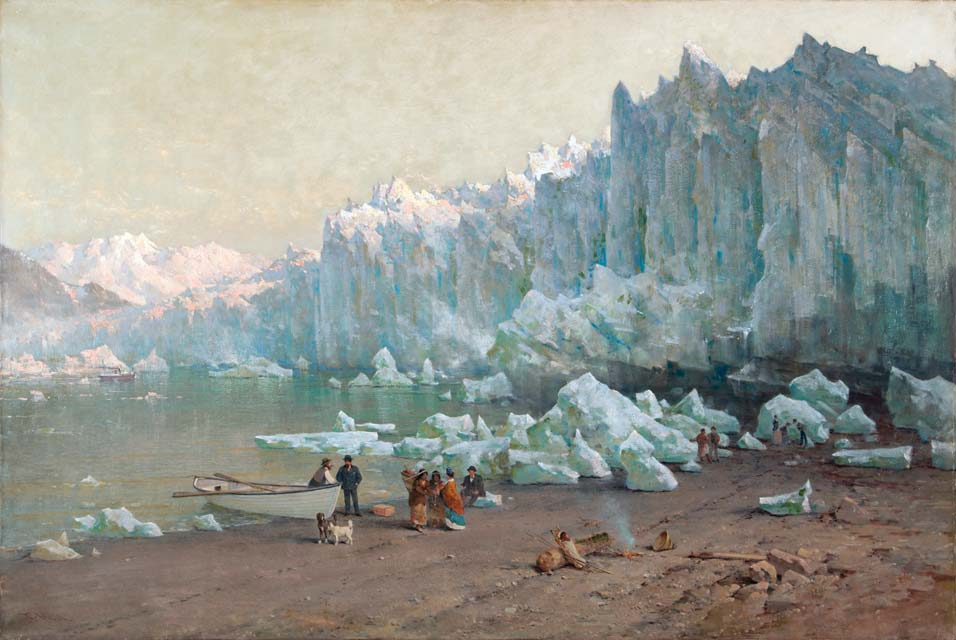
Muir Glacier, Alaska, Thomas Hill, 1887–88

== See also ==
- List of glaciers
