= Mount Wright (Alaska) =

Mountain in Alaska, United States

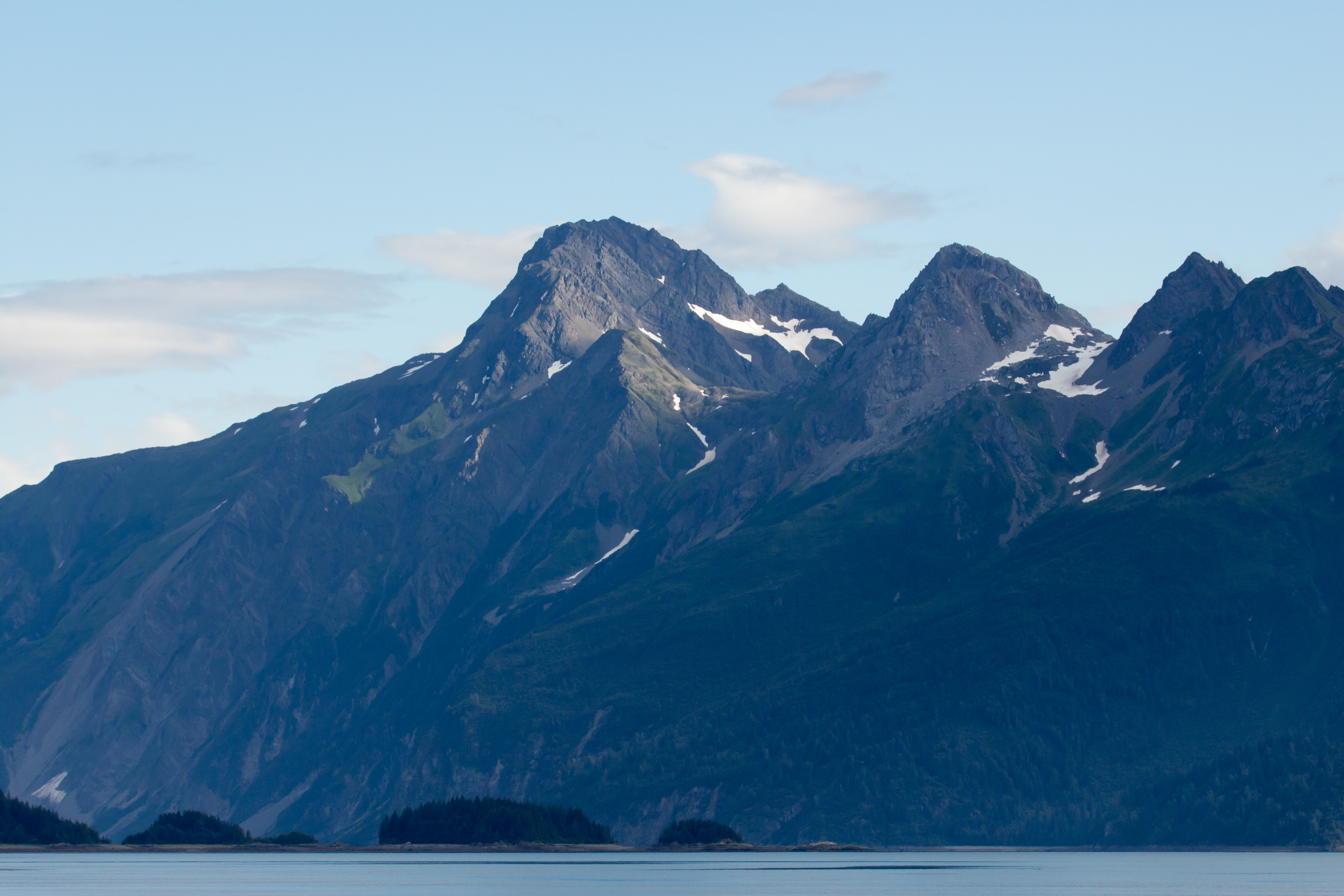
- Mount Wright from southwest

Highest point
- Elevation: 5,054 feet (1,540 m)
- Prominence: 1,850 feet (560 m)
- Parent peak: Mount Case
- Listing: Mountains of Alaska
- Coordinates: 58°47′52″N 136°01′38″W

Geography
- Location within Alaska
- Interactive map of Mount Wright
- Location: Glacier Bay National Park and Preserve, Alaska, United States
- Parent range: Alsek Ranges; Saint Elias Mountains
- Topo map: USGS Mount Fairweather D-1

Mount Wright is a 5,054-foot (1,540 m) mountain located in the eastern Alaskan panhandle, on the east side of Muir Inlet, just north of Glacier Bay within Glacier Bay National Park and Preserve.

== Location ==
Mount Wright is south of Adams Inlet, Dirt Gulch, and Dirt Glacier, to the east of Garforth Island in Muir Inlet, west of White Glacier, and the Chilkat Range and 52 miles (84 km) northwest of Hoonah, Saint Elias Mountains.

== History ==
Mount Wright was named by Dr. Harry Fielding Reid in 1891 after George Frederick Wright who spent some time in the Glacier Bay area in 1886. Forty-three miles to the west is another mountain also called Mount Wright.

== Climate ==
Based on the Köppen climate classification, Mount Wright has a subarctic climate (Dfc) with cold, snowy winters, and mild summers. Temperatures can drop below −20 °C with wind chill factors below −30 °C. Precipitation runoff from the mountain drains into Glacier Bay Basin.

== Fauna ==
The area has a high population of mountain goats.

== Gallery ==
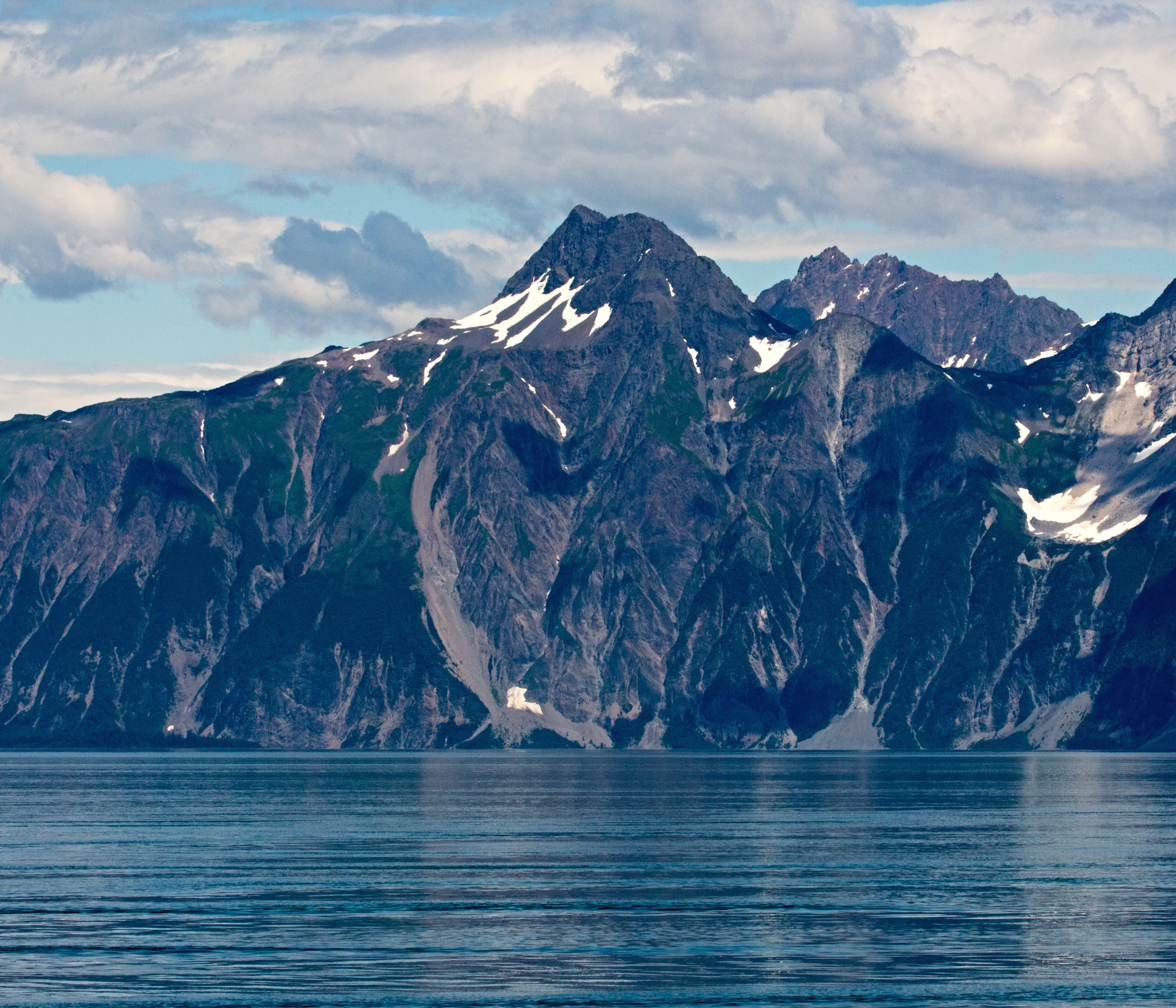
Mount Wright centered with Mt. Case behind right

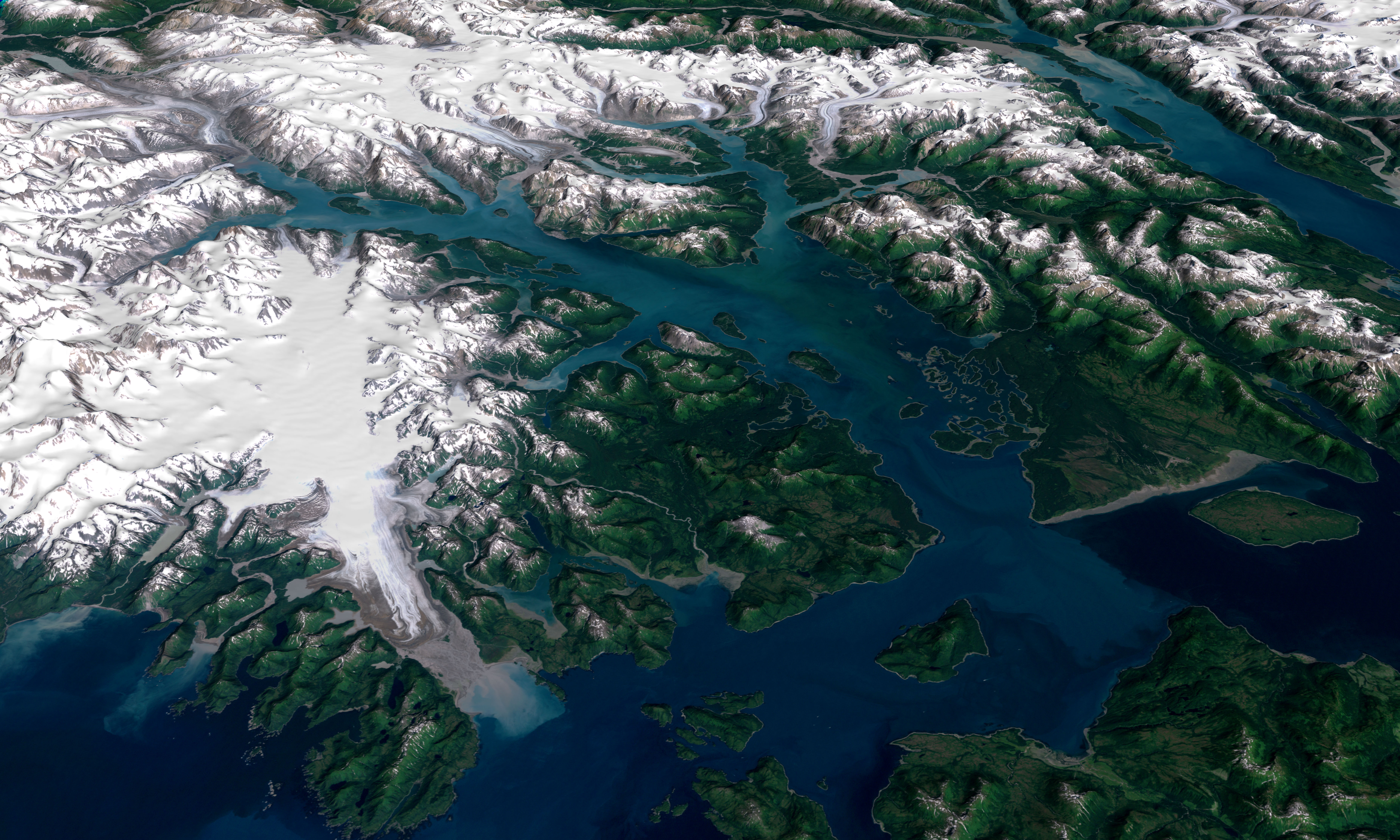
Glacier Bay basin
