= Tlingit (disambiguation) =

The Tlingit are an indigenous people of Alaska.

Tlingit may also refer to:

- Tlingit language
- Tlingit alphabet

== See also ==
- Tlingit clans
- Tlingit cuisine
- Mount Tlingit, a mountain in Alaska
- Mount Tlingit Ankawoo, a mountain in Alaska
- The Telengits, of Siberia
