= S. Hall Young =

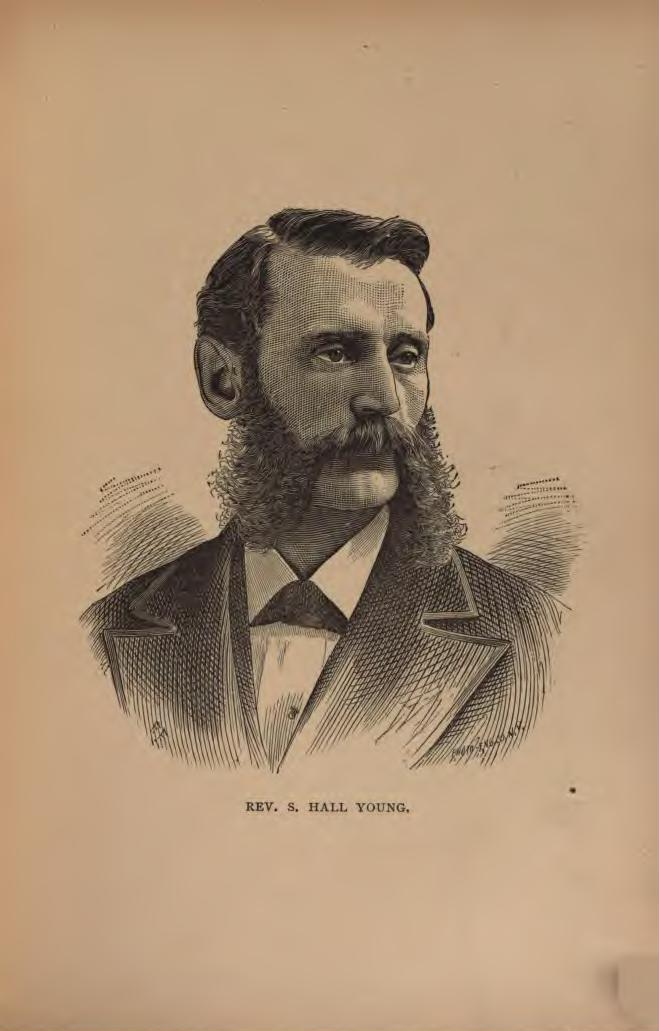
Samuel Hall Young, circa 1879.

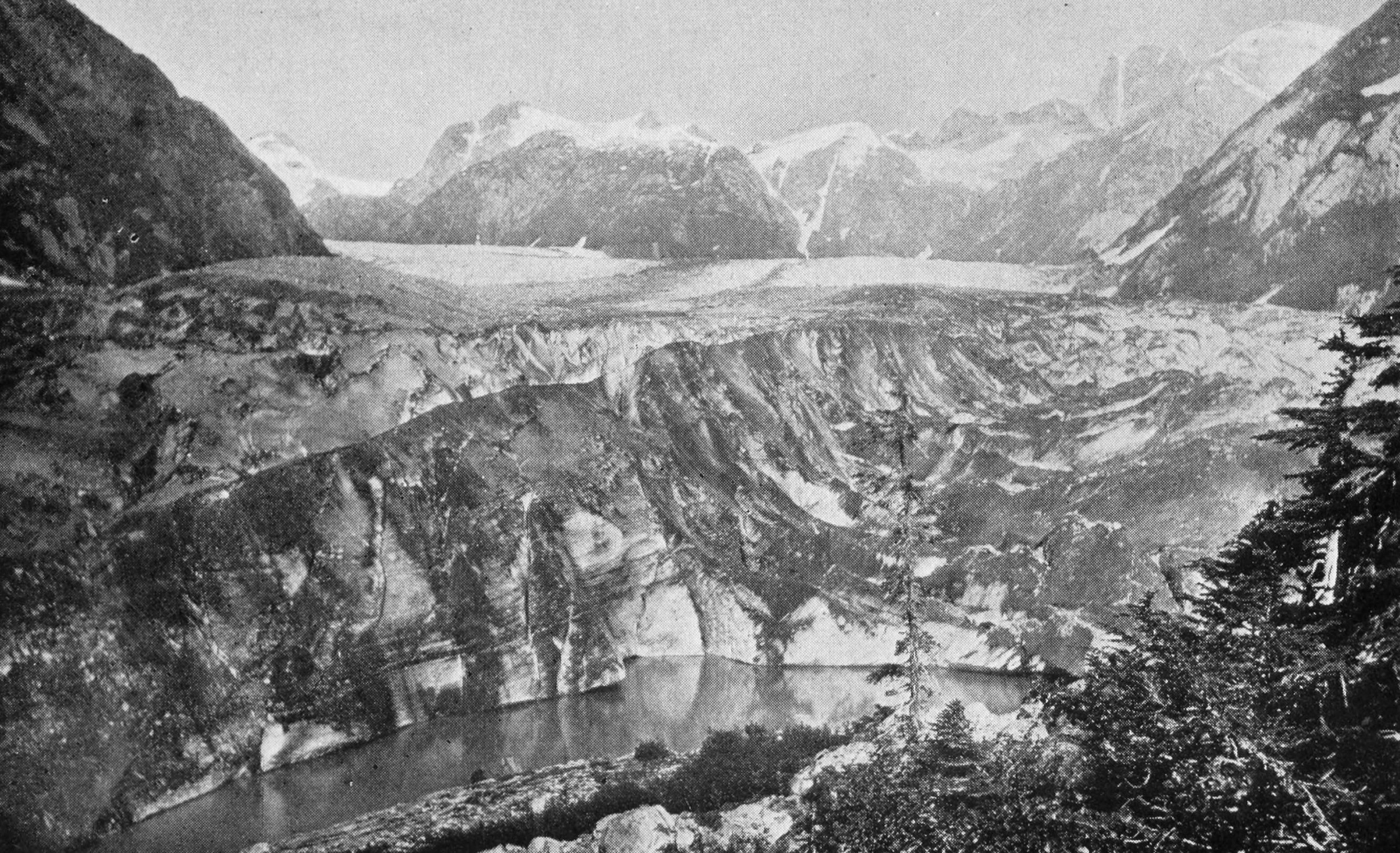
Scanned image from book by Samuel Hall Young, Alaska Days with John Muir, published in 1915

Samuel Hall Young (September 12, 1847–1927), more commonly known as S. Hall Young, was an American clergyman and pioneering Alaska missionary who is frequently mentioned in John Muir's final book, Travels in Alaska.

== Early life and education ==
Born in Butler, Pennsylvania, Young's father was Reverend Loyal Young,D.D., and his mother was Margaret Porter Young. He had 6 brothers and one sister. Young graduated from the University of Wooster in Ohio and the Western Theological Seminary in Allegheny, Pennsylvania. He was ordained by the Presbyterian Church.

== Career ==
He went to Fort Wrangel, Alaska as a missionary and explorer, organized the first Protestant Church in Alaska, held pastorates in California, Illinois, Iowa, and Ohio and was later sent to the Klondike. In 1879 and again in 1880 he accompanied John Muir when he was the first non-native to encounter Glacier Bay, Alaska. During a mountain climb on Mount Glenora (near Glenora, British Columbia) near the Stikine River, he almost fell to his death after dislocating both arms and was only saved from a narrow ledge when John Muir pulled him to safety with his teeth. This story is detailed by John Muir in Travels in Alaska and by Young himself in multiple subsequent publications. In 1904, he established the First Presbyterian Church in the new town of Fairbanks. He was appointed superintendent of Presbyterian missions in Alaska. He was the Special Representative of the Presbyterian National Board of Missions. While exploring Alaska with John Muir, Young undertook a census of the native people living there.

== Author ==
In 1915 Young published Alaska Days with John Muir.

== Adventurer ==
Young was known to some as the "Mushing Parson." His dog was the hero of John Muir's classic children's book Stickeen: The Story of a Dog (1909), which relates the true adventures of Young, Muir and Young's dog Stickeen.

== Personal life ==
Young was married to Frances Eddy Young and had three children with her.

== Death ==
Young died at the age of 79 in Clarksburg, West Virginia and is buried in Syracuse, New York.
