= Mount Emmerich =

Mountain in Alaska, United States

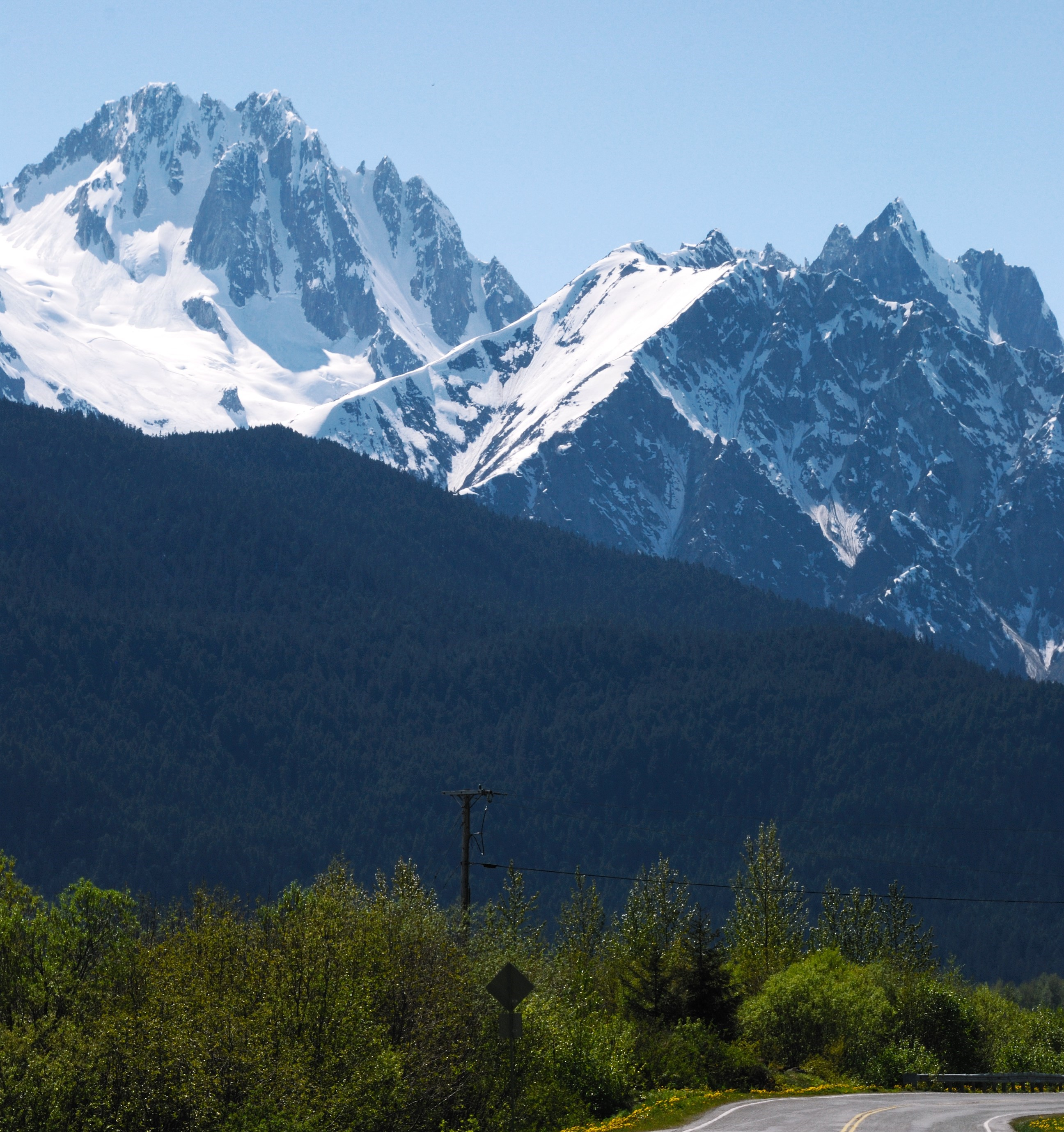
- Northeast aspect (left)

Highest point
- Elevation: 6,877 ft (2,096 m)
- Prominence: 1,929 ft (588 m)
- Parent peak: Mount Dech (Peak 7450)
- Isolation: 4.83 mi (7.77 km)
- Coordinates: 59°11′30″N 135°42′04″W

Naming
- Etymology: Lt. Charles F. Emmerich

Geography
- Location within Alaska
- Interactive map of Mount Emmerich
- Country: United States
- State: Alaska
- Borough: Haines
- Parent range: Saint Elias Mountains; Chilkat Range
- Topo map: USGS Skagway A-2

Geology
- Rock type: Granite

Climbing
- First ascent: 1976 Fred Beckey
- Easiest route: class 5.6 Southwest Ridge

Mount Emmerich is a 6,877-foot-elevation (2,096-meter) mountain summit in Alaska.

== Description ==
Mount Emmerich is located nine miles (14 km) west-southwest of Haines in the Chilkat Range which is a subrange of the Saint Elias Mountains. Precipitation runoff and glacial meltwater from the mountain's slopes drains to the Chilkat River via the Takhin and Kicking Horse rivers. Although modest in elevation, topographic relief is significant as the summit rises 5,377 feet (1,639 meters) above the Garrison Glacier in 1.5 mile (2.4 km). The first ascent of the summit was made on August 14, 1976, by Fred Beckey, Craig Zaspell, and Jack Tackle via the southwest ridge. The mountain's toponym has been officially adopted by the United States Board on Geographic Names. The mountain was named by the United States Coast and Geodetic Survey in 1897, to remember one of their own, Lieutenant Charles F. Emmerich (1849–1894), who served on the schooner Hassler in Alaska in 1893. According to the U.S. Geological Survey, this landform's local name is Cathedral Peak, "because of the mountain's prominence and cathedral-like appearance."

== Climate ==
According to the Köppen climate classification system, Mount Emmerich has a tundra climate with cold, snowy winters, and cool summers. Weather systems coming off the Gulf of Alaska are forced upwards by the mountains (orographic lift), causing heavy precipitation in the form of rainfall and snowfall. Winter temperatures can drop to 0 °F with wind chill factors below −10 °F. This climate supports small unnamed glaciers on the peak's slopes as well as the Bertha and Garrison glaciers in the surrounding valleys.

== Gallery ==
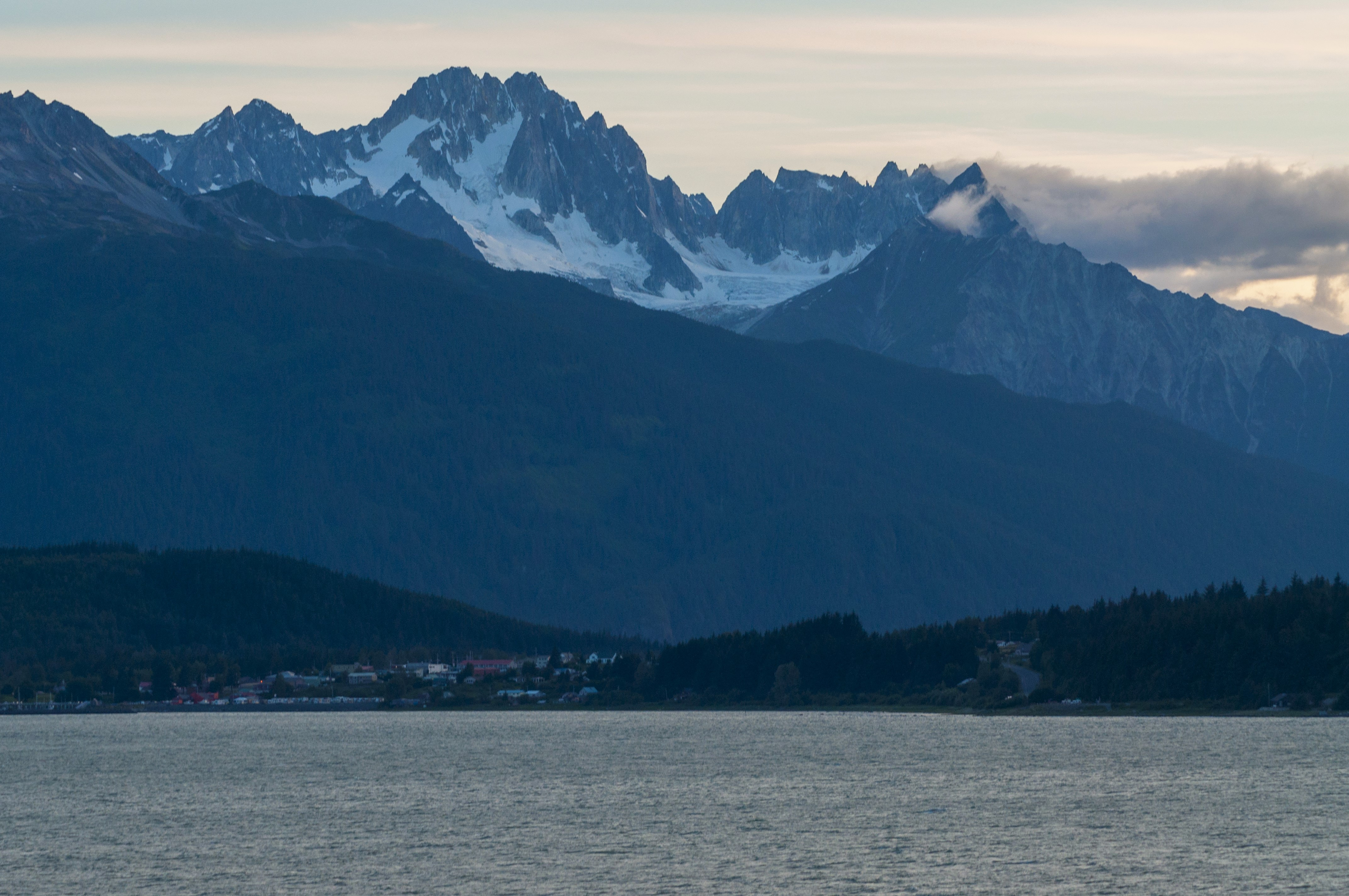
East aspect with some of Haines visible

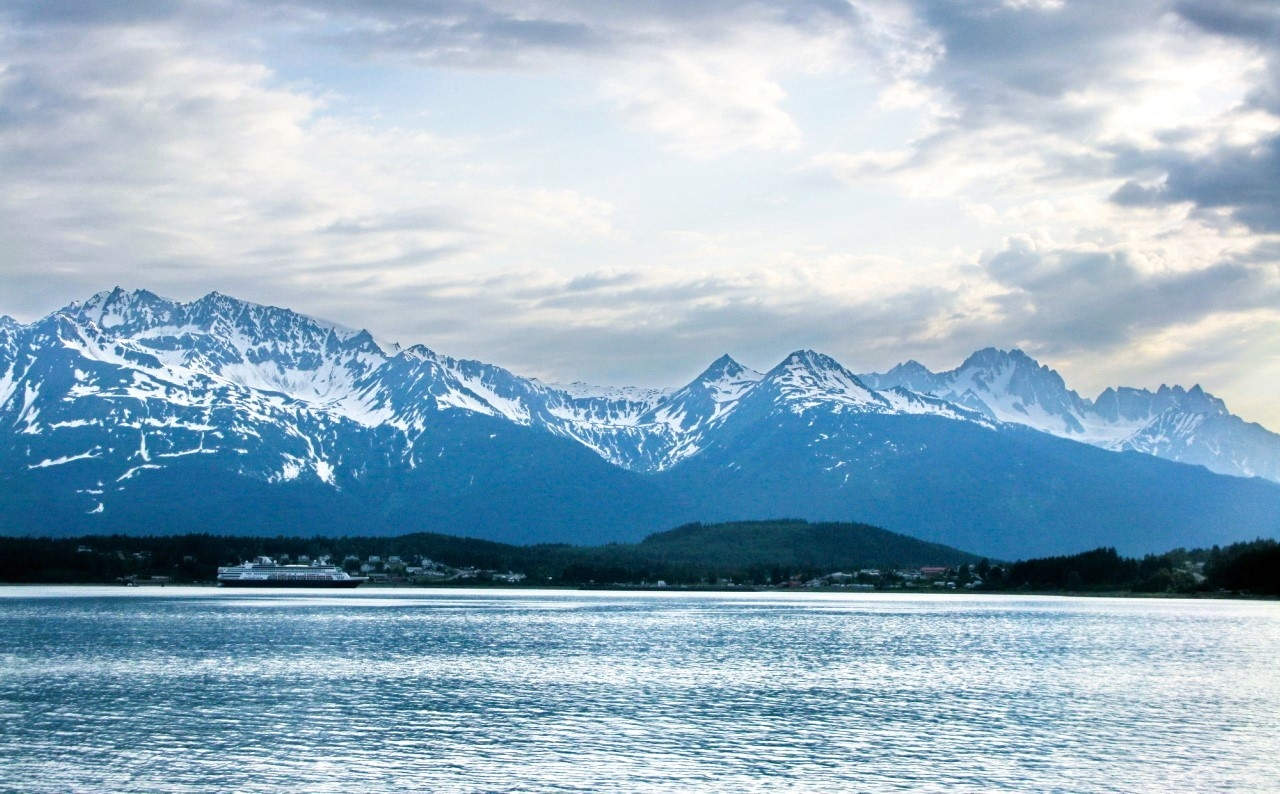
Looking west toward Haines with Mount Emmerich to the right

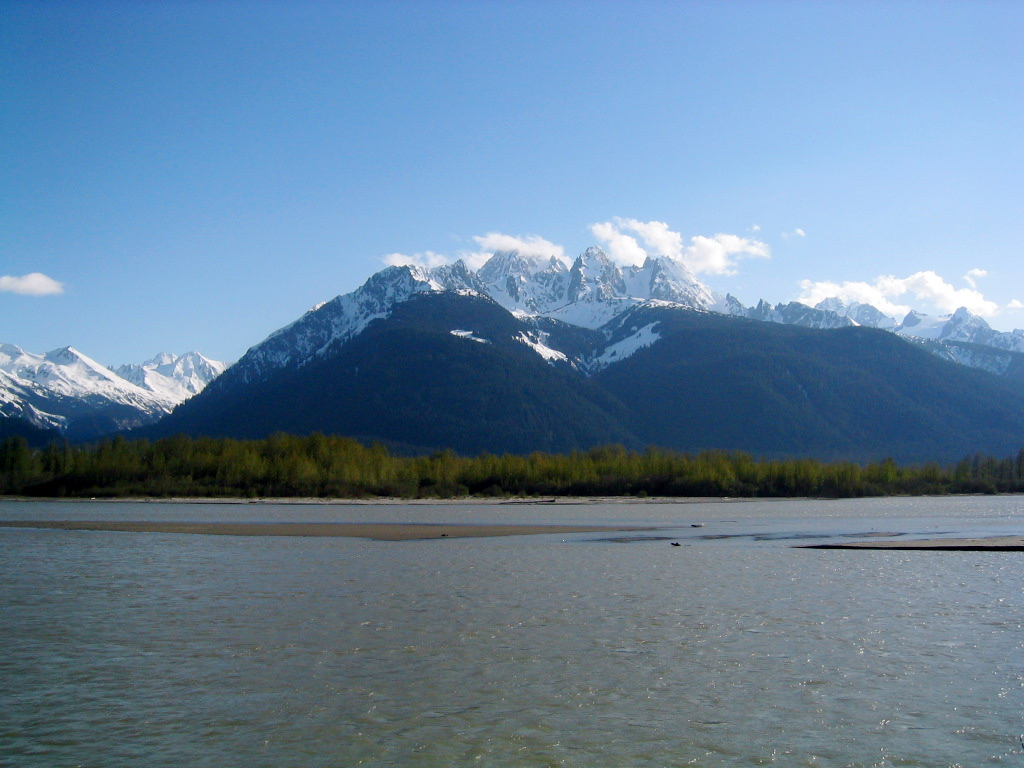
Mt. Emmerich across Chilkat River

== See also ==
- Geography of Alaska
