= Nun Mountain =

Mountain in Haines Borough, Alaska, United States

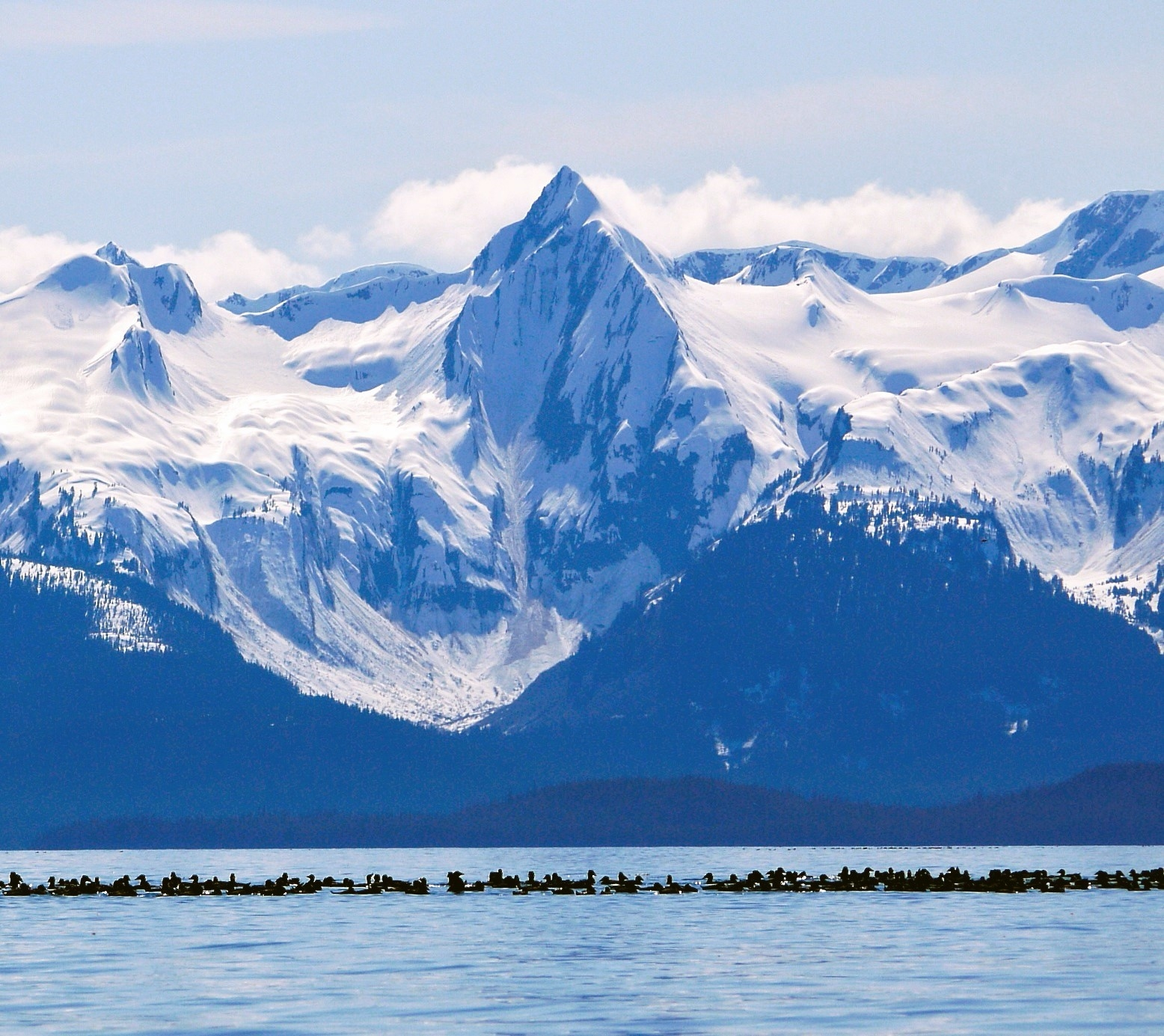
- Northeast aspect

Highest point
- Elevation: 4,329 ft (1,319 m)
- Prominence: 879 ft (268 m)
- Parent peak: Peak 4402
- Isolation: 1.59 mi (2.56 km)
- Coordinates: 58°30′15″N 135°15′26″W

Geography
- Location within Alaska
- Interactive map of Nun Mountain
- Country: United States
- State: Alaska
- Borough: Haines
- Protected area: Tongass National Forest
- Parent range: Saint Elias Mountains; Chilkat Range
- Topo map: USGS Juneau C-4

Nun Mountain is a 4,329-foot-elevation (1,319-meter) mountain summit in Alaska.

== Description ==
Nun Mountain is located 33 miles (53 km) northwest of Juneau in the Chilkat Range which is a subrange of the Saint Elias Mountains. Precipitation runoff and glacial meltwater from the mountain's slopes drains to Lynn Canal. Although modest in elevation, topographic relief is significant as the summit rises over 4,300 feet (1,311 meters) above tidewater of Lynn Canal in four miles (6.4 km) and the northeast face rises 3,300 feet (1,006 meters) in one mile (1.6 km). The mountain's name was published by the United States Coast and Geodetic Survey in 1924 and the toponym has been officially adopted by the United States Board on Geographic Names. The mountain is so named because of a fancied resemblance to a nun.

== Climate ==
According to the Köppen climate classification system, Nun Mountain is located in a tundra climate with cold, snowy winters, and cool summers. Weather systems coming off the Gulf of Alaska are forced upwards by the mountains (orographic lift), causing heavy precipitation in the form of rainfall and snowfall. Winter temperatures can drop to 0 °F with wind chill factors below −10 °F. This climate supports a small unnamed glacier in the peak's northwest cirque.

== Gallery ==
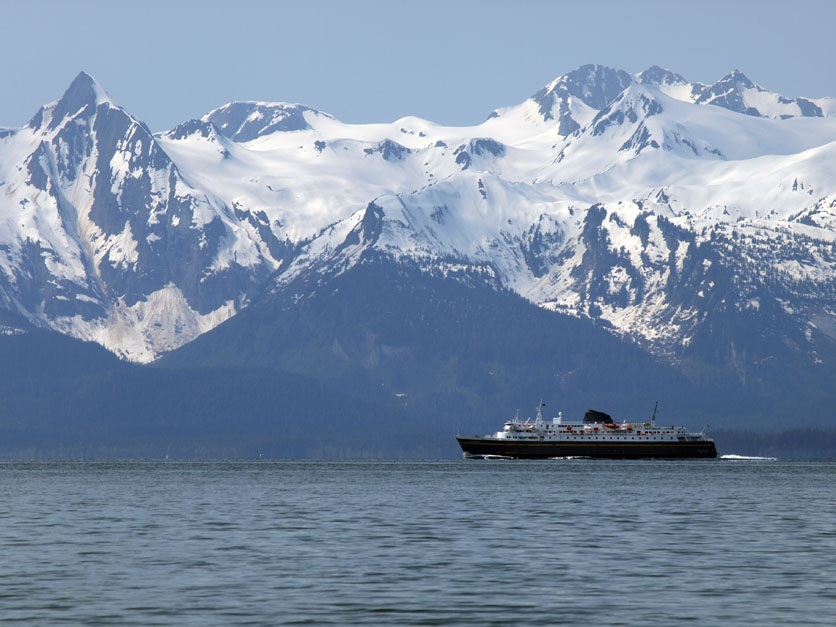
Nun Mountain at left edge of frame

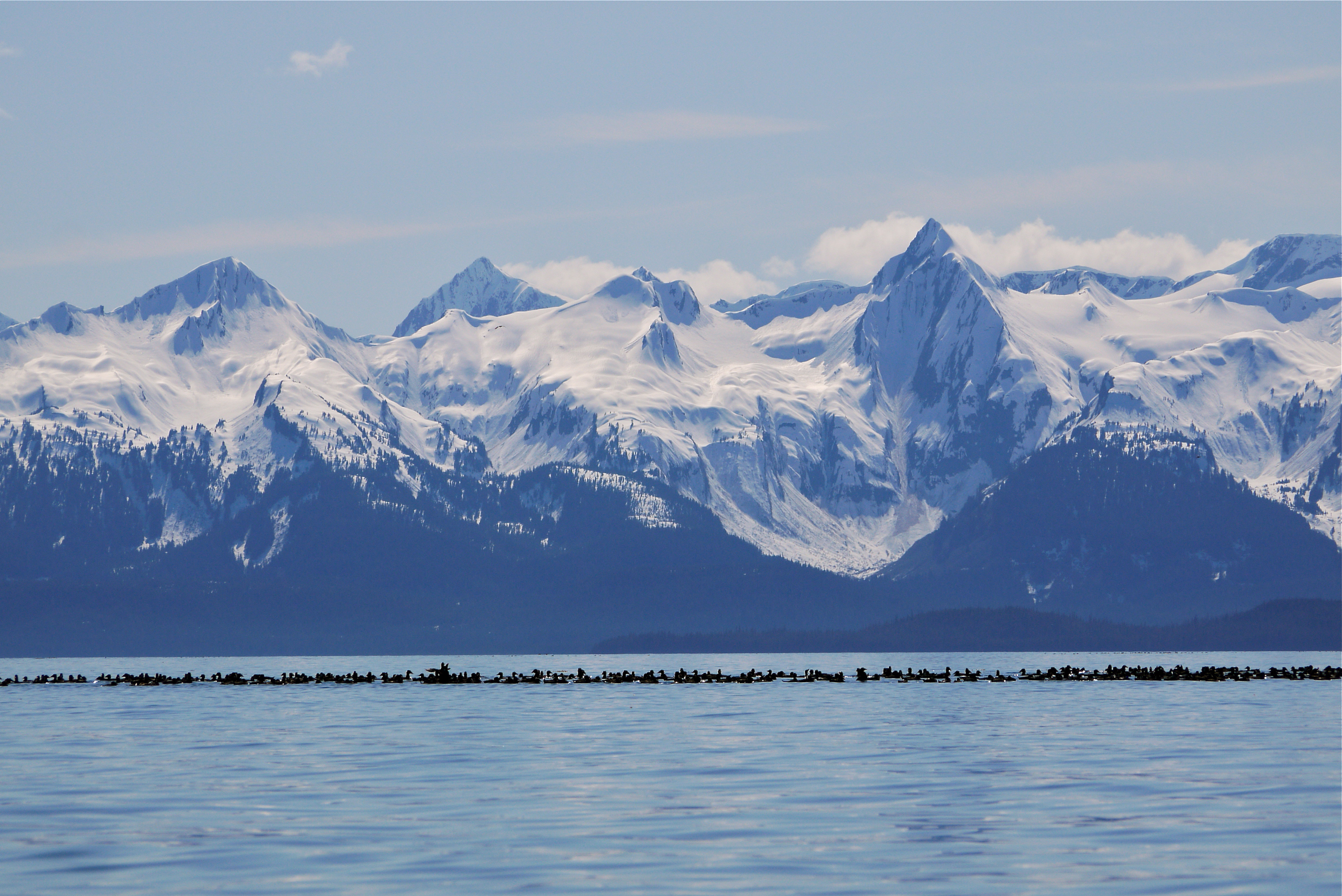
Nun Mountain to the right

== See also ==
- Geography of Alaska
