= Travels in Alaska =

Noted book by John Muir

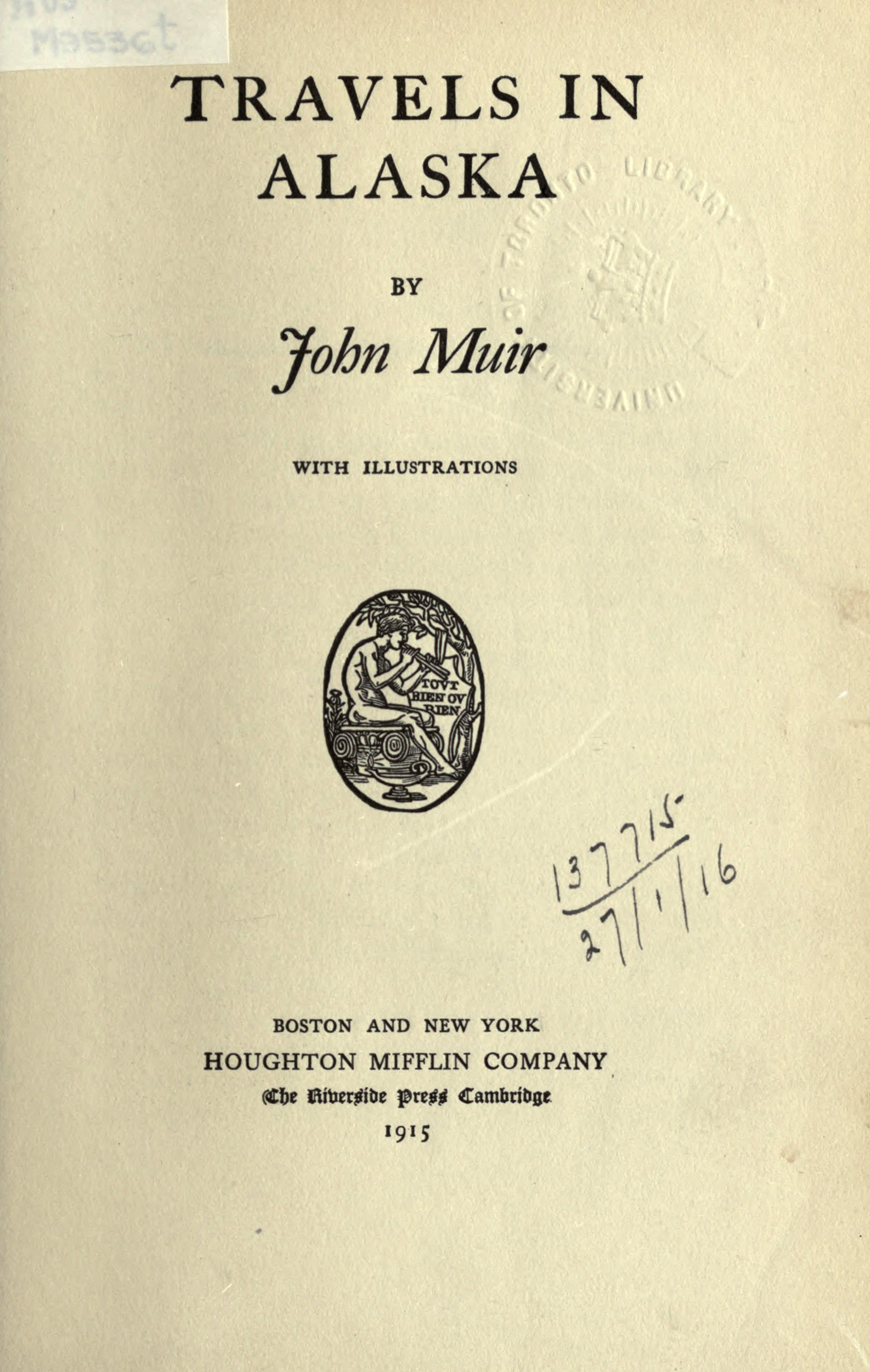
- Author: John Muir
- Publisher: Houghton Mifflin
- Publication date: 1915
- Pages: 399

Travels in Alaska is the last book written by the American naturalist John Muir, published posthumously in 1915 by the Houghton Mifflin Company and reprinted numerous times over the last century.

It compiles and expands the journal entries of three of the seven trips Muir took to Alaska, in the summers of 1879, 1880, and 1890 respectively, with those excursions primarily devoted to studying the glaciers of the southeastern panhandle of the then-territory.

== Chapter summary ==
=== Part I: The Trip of 1879 ===
I: Puget Sound and British Columbia—Muir departs San Francisco in May on the steamer Dakota (“without any definite plan”), traveling along the Pacific Northwest coastline, stopping over in the city of Victoria B.C. and exploring much of Puget Sound before doubling back to Portland, Oregon, where he books passage on the mail steamer California for Alaska.

II: Alexander Archipeligo and the Home I Found in Alaska—Muir cruises the Inside Passage as far as Sitka, then backtracks to base himself on Wrangell Island, where he falls in with a group of Presbyterian missionaries he met earlier in his journey and finds a room in the home of a hospitable local merchant named Mr. Vanderbilt.

III: Wrangell Island and Alaska Summers—Muir enjoys exploring the island and making friends with the local Tlinkit Indians but finds Wrangell village and its abandoned military stockade “a rough place… No mining hamlet in the placer gulches of California, nor any backwoods village I ever saw, approached it in picturesque, devil-may-care abandon.”

V: The Stickeen (now usually spelled "Stikine") River—Muir joins the missionary party on a small steamer up the Stickeen River more than 150 miles to the former Hudson’s Bay Company trading post at Glenora, British Columbia, where a hike to view the Glenora Peak turns into a near-tragedy when his companion, the Reverend S. Hall Young, takes a precarious fall.

V: A Cruise in the Cassiar—In July, with “the very brightest and best of Alaska summer weather,” Muir joins the missionaries on a trip up the coast to “the Chilcat country,” where they hope to establish missions among the Chilcat tribes as his mind is on “the mountains, glaciers, and forests.”

VI: The Cassiar Trail—Back in Wrangell the next month, Muir makes a second trip up the Stickeen River to Glenora and then continues north into British Columbia on foot to follow the “dry, grassy hills and plains of the Cassier Trail,” which had been the main route of the Cassier Gold Rush a decade earlier and was still an active mining area.

VII: Glenora Peak—From Dease Lake on the Cassier gold trail, Muir retraces his steps back to Glenora (a walk of over 200 miles) where he makes a second and this time successful attempt to reach the summit of Glenora Peak, finding it “one of the greatest and most impressively sublime of all the mountain views I have ever enjoyed.”

VIII: Exploration of the Stickeen Glaciers—Borrowing a canoe and two Indian deck hands from the captain of the steamer Gertrude, Muir embarks on several days of exploring the glaciers that line the river delta, then strikes out on his own to continue his survey up close and on foot before hitching a ride on a passing canoe back to Wrangell.

IX: A Canoe Voyage to Northward—In mid-October, with winter coming on, Muir partners with his missionary friend, Mr. Young, and a party of four experienced Indian guides on an excursion north to “the Chilcat country” at the head of Lynn Canal, stopping at several Tlinkit villages along the way.

X: The Discovery of Glacier Bay—To Muir’s surprise (because it was not on the detailed charts made by Captain Vancouver a century earlier), the party accidentally finds its way into the glacial wonderland that is now Glacier Bay National Park—“a solitude of ice and snow and newborn rocks… unspeakably pure and sublime.”

XI: The Country of the Chilcats—Muir deems the Chilcats to be the “most influential of all the Tlinkit tribes” but after journeying most of the way to their territory in the Lynn Canal area, the worsening winter weather and reports of unrest among the tribes convinces him to turn around and head back without visiting their principal village.

XII: The Return to Fort Wrangell—Muir spots whales, explores fiords, and has numerous adventurous encounters on the way back but just misses the mail steamer at Wrangell and, in what “is said to be the coldest weather ever experienced in south-eastern Alaska,” he has to wait a month before he can get another ship back to California.

XIII: Alaska Indians—In this essay chapter, Muir imparts what he has learned about the native Tlinkit: “their customs, what manner of men they were, how they lived and loved, fought and played, their morals, religion, hopes and fears, and superstitions, how they resembled and differed in their characteristics from our own and other races.”

=== PART II: The Trip of 1880 ===
XIV: Sum Dum Bay—In early August of the next year, Muir returns to Alaska on the steamer California and, again in the company of Mr. Young and his Indian guides, leaves Wrangell in a canoe of “about twenty-five feet long by five wide” to continue his explorations, this time in the territory of the Hoona (Huna) tribes of the Sum Dum Bay region.

XV: From Taku River to Taylor Bay—Arriving at the mouth of the Taku River (near present day Juneau), the party visits an inexplicably deserted Taku Indian village and explores the Taku fiord before pushing north to Taylor Bay, where Muir explores the largest of the nearby glaciers with Young’s little dog “Stickeen” as his companion.

XVI: Glacier Bay—As the season ends, Muir returns to Glacier Bay for a more extensive exploration of its icy magnificence (including the vast glacier that would later be named after him and “probably contains as much ice as all the eleven hundred Swiss glaciers combined”), then continues on to Sitka to catch the mail steamer for Portland.

=== PART III: The Trip of 1890 ===
XVII: In Camp at Glacier Bay—A decade later, Muir makes his third trip to Southeastern Alaska (and fourth trip to Alaska, having in the meantime journeyed to Point Barrow and the extreme north), which he finds much impacted by receding glaciers and the intrusion of a lively tourist industry.

XVIII: My Sled-Trip On the Muir Glacier—Muir’s 10-day, solo sled-trip “to obtain general views of the main upper part of the Muir Glacier” becomes a harrowing survival story when, suffering the effects of a bad cold and eyes so enflamed he is “nearly blind,” he plunges into a water-filled crevasse.

XIX: Auroras—A few days after finding his way safely back to camp, Muir pushes northward again and, following another adventure in which he is nearly crushed between two colliding icebergs, he is entertained by a series of aurora borealis, including one that “in supreme, serene, supernatural beauty surpassed everything auroral I ever beheld.”

== Background ==
Travels in Alaska is full of Muir’s intimate observations and lyrical evocation of the territory’s plants, animals, geology, geography and native culture; but, according to Muir’s friend and biographer William Frederick Badè in a preface to the book’s original edition, the prime attraction of Alaska to Muir were “its stupendous living glaciers,” which deeply fascinated him on both a scientific and spiritual level.

Using both material that had earlier been published as dispatches to the San Francisco Bulletin and a “great mass of Alaska notes that had accumulated under his hands for more than thirty years,” the book was begun in July 1912, shortly after Muir returned from a seven-month trip to Africa. It was interrupted by his worsening health, the outbreak of World War I, and the trials of his ill-fated lobbying campaign to save California’s Hetch-Hetchy Valley from commercial destruction.

Toward the end of 1914, Muir took the manuscript south with him on a visit to see his new grandson and daughter Helen on her ranch in the Mojave Desert. He continued writing and editing there but came down with pneumonia and had to be transferred by train to a hospital in Los Angeles for treatment. He died Christmas Eve 1914, “alone in the hospital with the pages of the Travels in Alaska manuscript scattered about him on the bed.”

The book ends rather abruptly in the middle of the 1890 trip and is essentially unfinished. Badè states in the original preface that Muir’s “notes on the remainder of the journey have not been found, and it is idle to speculate how he would have concluded the volume if he had lived to complete it.”

== Legacy ==
Part of the book's Chapter XV was previously published in The Century Illustrated Monthly Magazine in September 1897 as "An Adventure with a Dog and a Glacier," and in 1909 was expanded into a short book titled Stickeen. According to the Sierra Club, it is one of Muir's best-known works and is widely regarded as a classic dog story.

Since Muir’s three journeys take place over the route of what is today’s booming, million-passenger-a-year Inside Passage cruise-ship industry, many modern Alaska travel books quote Travels in Alaska, often in long passages, both for its poetic descriptions of the scenery and to measure how the landscape has changed since Muir’s time.

In a 2018 article for Men’s Journal, author and journalist Mark Adams retraced the Glacier Bay portions of Muir’s explorations.
