= Elizabeth Koehler-Pentacoff =

American author (born 1957)

- Born: Elizabeth Koehler; 1957 (age 68–69)
- Occupations: Author, instructor
- Spouse: Robert Pentacoff
- Writing career
- Language: English

Elizabeth Koehler-Pentacoff (born 1957) is an American author. She has written both fiction and nonfiction, as well as children's literature and adult books. Her memoir, The Missing Kennedy: Rosemary Kennedy and the Secret Bonds of Four Women (2015) is about her experience with President Kennedy's sister and the author's aunt, Sister Paulus, Rosemary's caregiver and friend. The Missing Kennedy appeared on the New York Times Bestseller List for e-book non-fiction for the week of September 27, 2015. She also wrote the instructional book, The ABCs of Writing for Children, which was a Writer's Digest Book Club selection.

== Early life and education ==
Koehler-Pentacoff was born in Milwaukee, Wisconsin, and grew up in nearby Oconomowoc.

She moved to California as a teenager to attend college. She chose a double major in children's theater and liberal studies and graduated from California State University Fresno in 1979.

== Career ==
When Koehler-Pentacoff began writing children's books, she also instructed adult teachers through California State University, East Bay. She taught weekend classes of creative drama and improvisation. Later she taught writing for children and writing comedy through UC Santa Cruz Extension located in Cupertino.

She has worked with the California Writers Club Mt. Diablo Branch's Young Writers Contest since 1995.

== Personal life ==
She married Robert Pentacoff in 1981, taught elementary and middle school and directed children's theater before turning to freelance writing for magazines and newspapers. When her son, Christopher, was young, she wrote stories for him, which led her to writing books for children.

== Selected works ==
- The Missing Kennedy: Rosemary Kennedy and the Secret Bonds of Four Women (2015)
- Jackson and Bud's Bumpy Ride: America's First Cross-Country Road Trip (2009)
- John Muir and Stickeen: An Alaskan Adventure (2003) (about Stickeen)
- The ABC's of Writing for Children (2002)
- You're Kidding! Incredible Facts about the presidents (1999)
- Help! My Life Is Going to the Dogs (1997)
- Wish Magic (1996)
- Louise the One and Only (1995)
- Explorers (1994)
- Curtain Call (1989)

== Anthologies ==
- Author to Editor, Compiled by Linda Arms White, 1999
- Writers in the Kitchen, Compiled by Tricia Gardella, Boyds Mills Press, 1998
- Classroom Celebrations, Compiled by Teaching & Learning Company, 1996

== Sources ==
- Library Journal, October 2, 2015
- Booklist, July 1996, p. 1826; October 15, 2003, Carolyn Phelan, review of John Muir and Stickeen: An Alaskan Adventure, p. 407
- Kirkus Reviews, November 1, 2003, review of John Muir and Stickeen, p. 1311
- Library Journal, March 15, 2003, Denise S. Stricha, review of The ABCs of Writing for Children: 114 Children's Authors and Illustrators Talk about the Art, the Business, the Craft, and the Life of Writing Children's Literature, p. 92
- School Library Journal, August 1996, p. 125; November 2003, Susannah Price, review of The ABCs of Writing for Children, p. 175
  January 2004, Margaret Bush, review of John Muir and Stickeen, p. 118
- Writer, June 2004, Joan Azelrod-Contrada, review of Inspiration and Tips for Children's Writers, p. 45
