= Glenora, British Columbia =

Human settlement in British Columbia, Canada

Glenora Fort Glenora Glenora Landing
- Former settlement
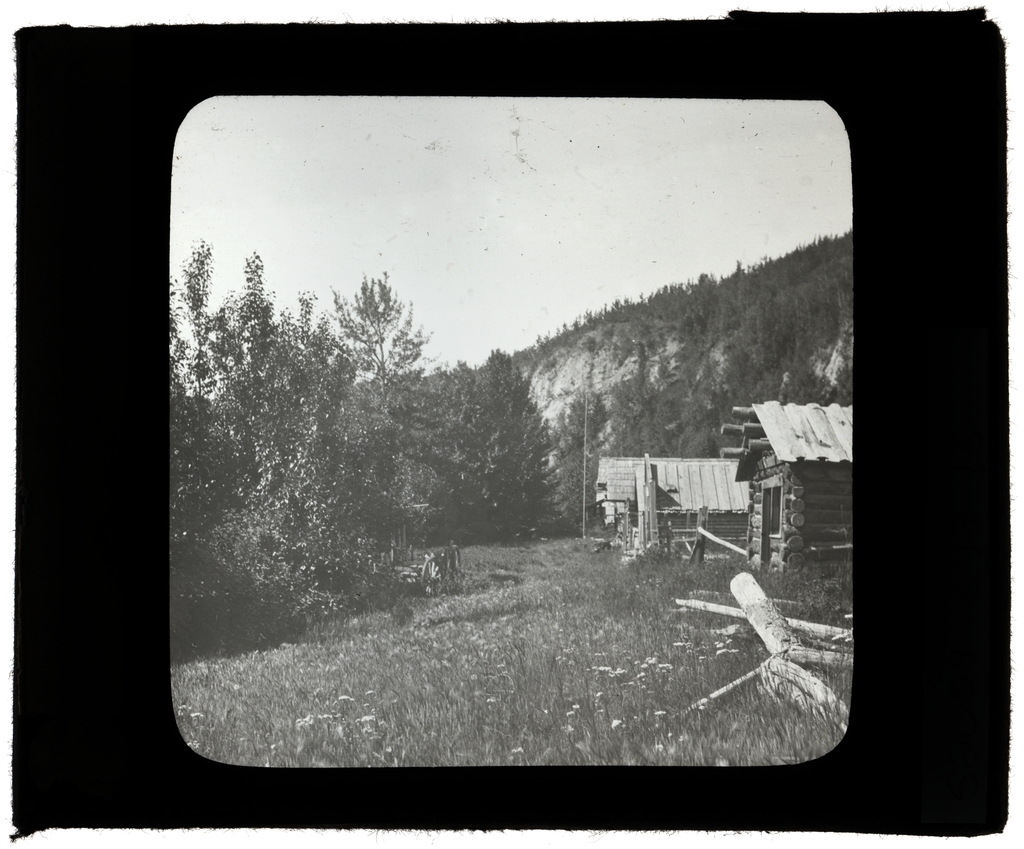
- Glenora, British Columbia, in the 1900s

- Location of Glenora in British Columbia
- Coordinates: 57°50′37″N 131°23′19″W
- Country: Canada
- Province: British Columbia

Glenora, also known historically as the Hudson's Bay Company's Fort Glenora and during the Cassiar Gold Rush as Glenora Landing, was an unincorporated settlement in the Stikine Country of northwestern British Columbia, Canada. It was located on the banks of the Stikine River, just southwest and approximately 21 kilometres (13 mi) downstream from the community of Telegraph Creek. A customs office existed 1901–1903.

== Name origin ==
Helen B. Akrigg and G.P.V. Akrigg in their British Columbia Place Names ascribe the origin of the name to a combination of the Gaelic glenn for "valley" with the Spanish ora for gold.

== Association with John Muir ==
In his final book, Travels in Alaska, naturalist John Muir describes a steamboat journey he made up the Stickeen (Stikine) River from the town of Wrangell in 1879 to "the old Hudson's Bay trading post at Glenora." The area's chief feature of interest to him was Glenora Peak, the highest of "an outstanding group of mountains crowning a spur from the main chain of the Coast Range," at a distance of "about seven or eight miles" from the post. "Though the time was short I determined to climb it," he wrote, "because of the advantageous position it occupied for general views of the peaks and glaciers of the east side of the great range."

Learning of the climb, the noted Alaska missionary Samuel Hall Young, who was also a passenger on the steamboat, tagged along, claiming to be an experienced mountaineer. But when the pair were "within a minute or two of the top," Young took a bad fall, dislocating both shoulders and lodging in a precarious position, "face downward, his arms outstretched, clutching little crumbling knobs on the brink of a gully that plunges down a thousand feet or more to a small residential glacier." After several unsuccessful attempts, Muir finally rescued his companion from that cliffhanging situation and managed to slowly help him down the steep rocky mountainside and seven miles back to the post through the darkness of night. He later wrote in his book (published posthumously in 1915, a year after his death) that he "never intended to write a word about" the incident, but Mr. Young, "in his mission lectures in the East, oftentimes told" the tale and "after a miserable, sensational caricature of the story appeared in a respectable magazine, I thought it but fair that it should be told just as it happened."

In the version of the incident in Young's 1915 memoir, Alaska Days with John Muir, the famed naturalist pulled the hapless missionary to safety with his teeth.

Muir returned to Glenora Peak later that summer of 1879 and, with no companion, successfully completed the ascent. "It is hard to fail in reaching a mountain-top that one starts for," he wrote, "let the cause be what it may." At the summit, "one of the greatest and most impressively sublime of all the mountain views I have ever enjoyed came full in sight−more than three hundred miles of closely packed peaks of the great Coast Range, sculptured in the boldest manner imaginable, their naked tops and dividing ridges dark in color, their sides and the (canyons), gorges, and valleys between them loaded with glaciers and snow."

== See also ==
- Grand Canyon of the Stikine
- SS Fort Glenora
