= Garforth Island =

Island in the United States of America

- Location in Alaska

Geography
- Coordinates: 58°47′21″N 136°04′22″W

Administration
- United States
- State: Alaska

Garforth Island is an uninhabited island located in the U.S. state of Alaska, in the Hoonah-Angoon area of the Unorganized Borough, within Glacier Bay National Park.

== Location ==
Garforth Island is south of Muir Point, where the mouth of Muir Inlet narrows, and west of Mount Wright. Muir Inlet branches northeast off Glacier Bay.

== Description ==
Garforth Island is barren and rocky.

=== Fauna ===
Harbor seals (Phoca vitulina richardsi) and Steller sea lions (Eumetopias jubatus) haul out on the rocks of the island to rest, and the waters contain walleye, pollock, capelin, Pacific sand lance, herring, and salmon. There are also humpback whales (Megaptera novaeangliae), killer whales, harbor porpoises (Phocoena phocoena), and sea otters (Enhydra lutris).
