= Mount Golub =

Mountain in Alaska, United States

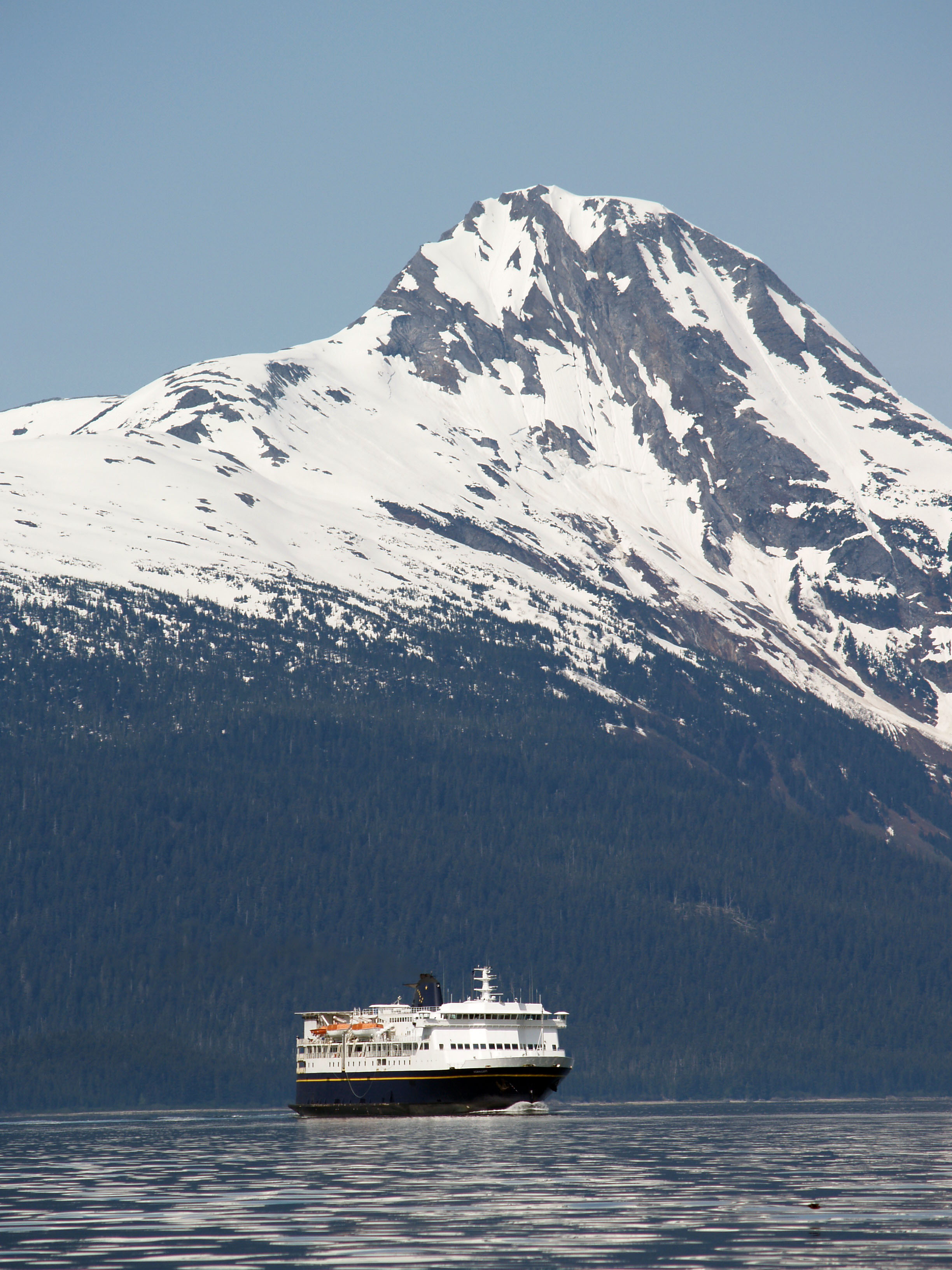
- Mt. Golub and ferry

Highest point
- Elevation: 4,194 ft (1,280 m)
- Prominence: 1,594 ft (486 m)
- Isolation: 2.17 mi (3.49 km)
- Coordinates: 58°27′49″N 135°10′22″W

Geography
- Location within Alaska
- Interactive map of Mount Golub
- Country: United States
- State: Alaska
- Borough: Haines
- Protected area: Tongass National Forest
- Parent range: Chilkat Range; Alsek Ranges; Saint Elias Mountains
- Topo map: USGS Juneau B-4

Climbing
- First ascent: 1968
- Easiest route: Northeast ridge

Mount Golub is a prominent 4,194 ft (1,280 m) mountain summit located in the Chilkat Range of the Saint Elias Mountains, in the U.S. state of Alaska. This peak is situated 29 miles (47 km) northwest of Juneau, and 2 mi (3 km) west of Lynn Canal, on land managed by Tongass National Forest. Although modest in elevation, relief is significant since Mount Golub rises above tidewater in less than two miles. The mountain's name was officially adopted in 1972 by the U.S. Board on Geographic Names to commemorate Harvey Golub (1930–1971), member of the 1968 first ascent party. Other members of the party were Richard Folta, Delbert Carnes, and Keith Hart. Hart submitted the name for consideration following the September 4, 1971, untimely death of Harvey Golub who perished in the Alaska Airlines Flight 1866 disaster. That flight, which took all 111 lives aboard, crashed in a canyon approximately seven miles south of his namesake mountain.

== Climate ==
Based on the Köppen climate classification, Mount Golub has a subarctic climate with cold, snowy winters, and cool summers. Weather systems coming off the Gulf of Alaska are forced upwards by the Saint Elias Mountains (orographic lift), causing heavy precipitation in the form of rainfall and snowfall. Winter temperatures can drop to 0 °F with wind chill factors below −10 °F. The month of July offers the most favorable weather for viewing or climbing Mount Golub.

== Gallery ==
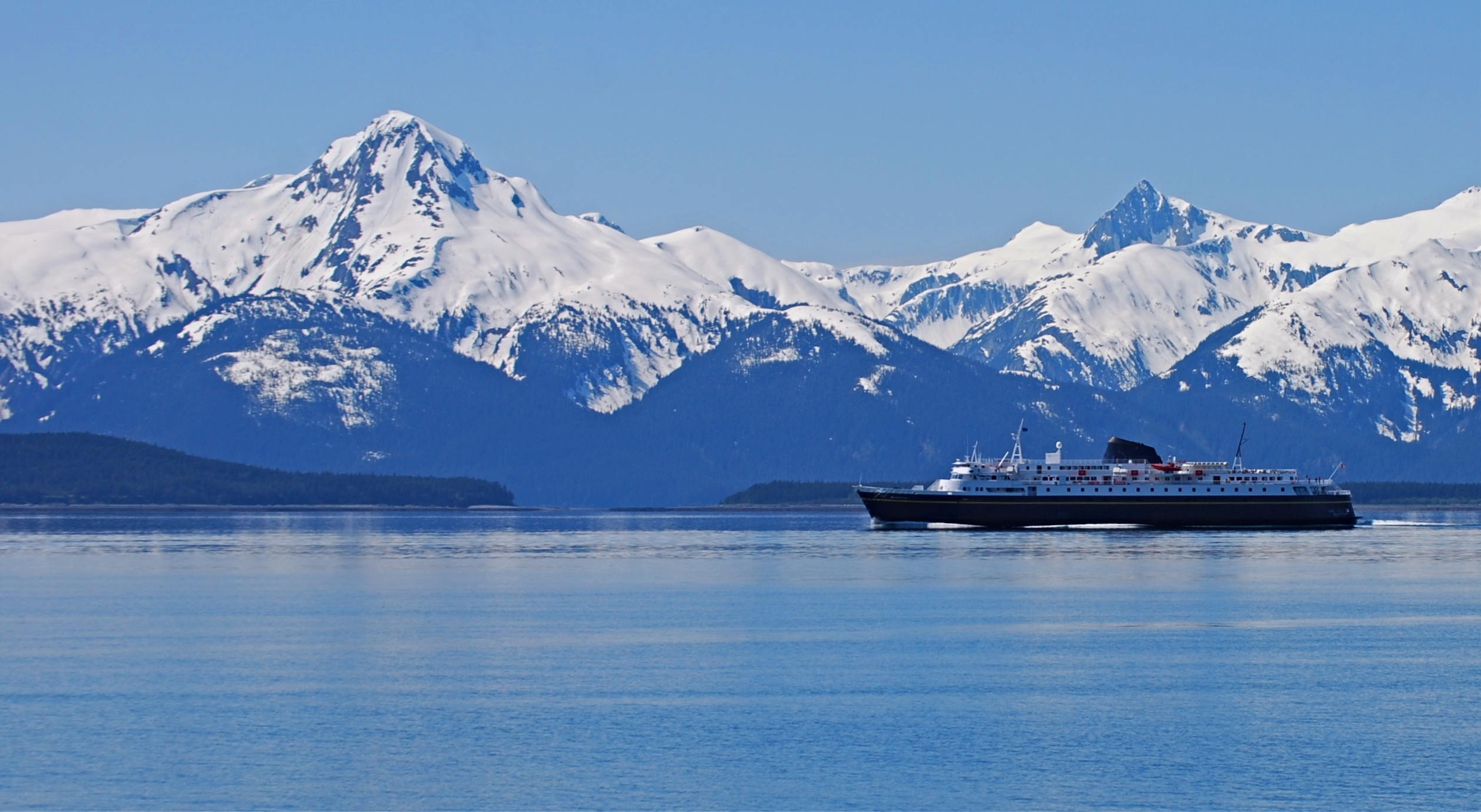

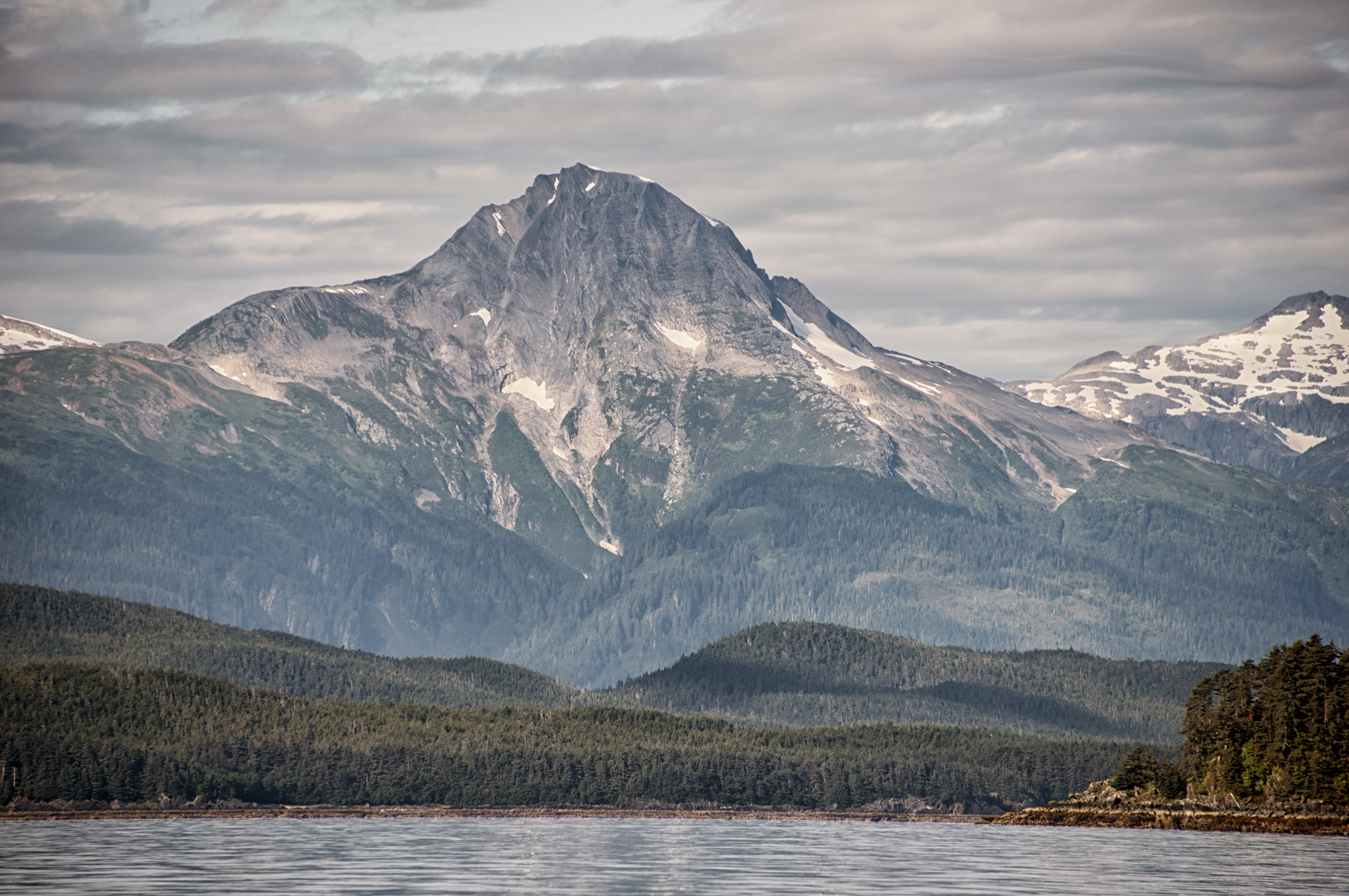

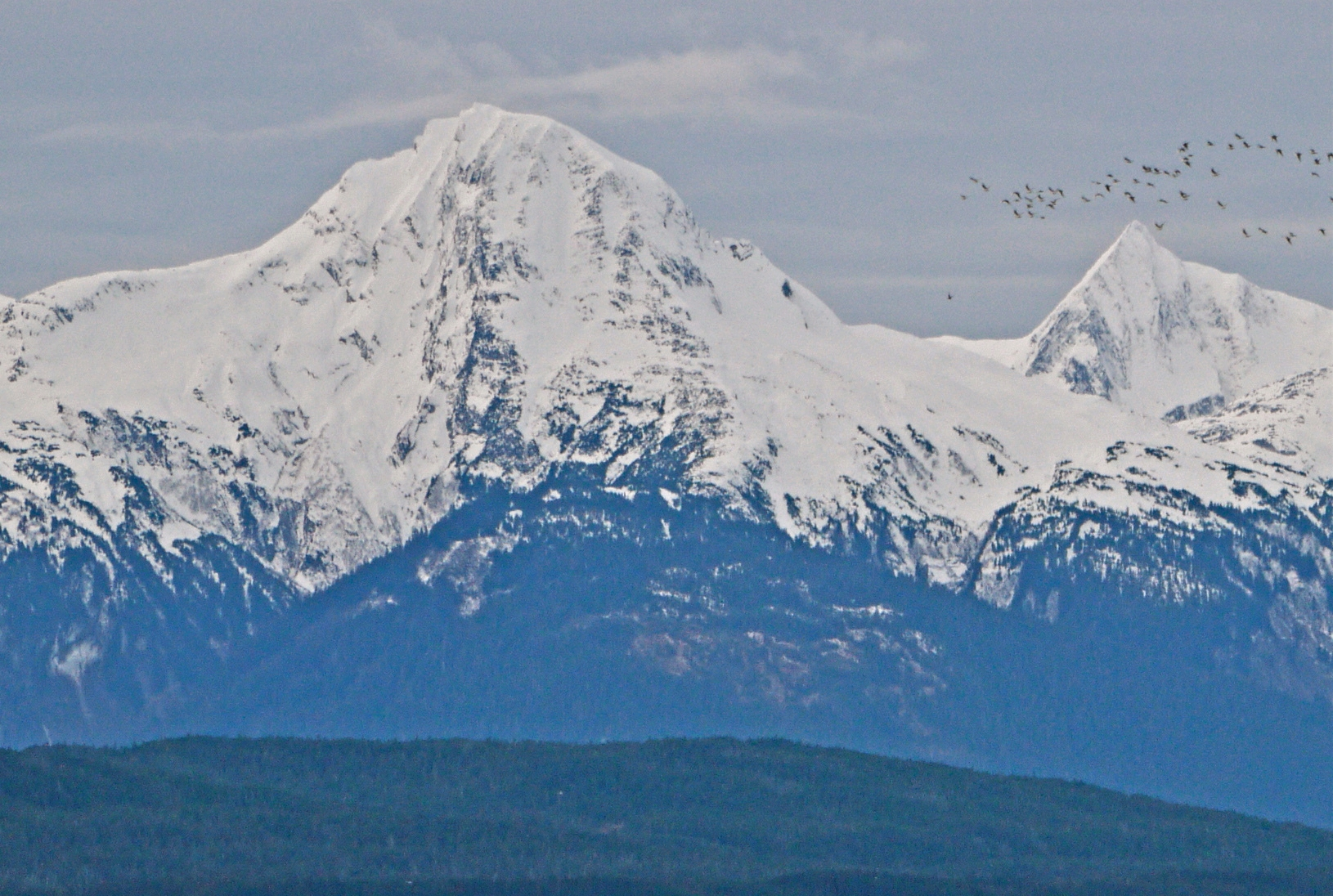

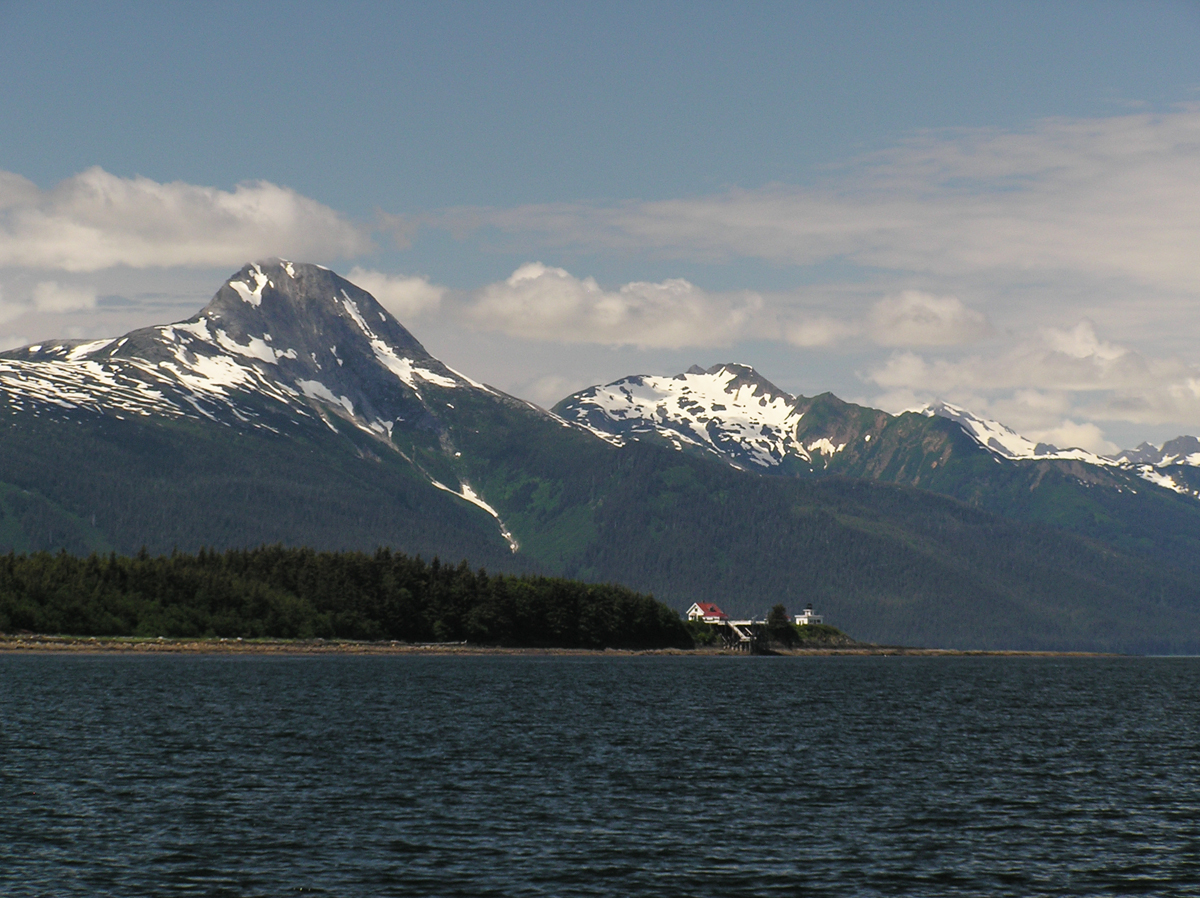
Mt. Golub to left

== See also ==
- List of mountain peaks of Alaska
- Geography of Alaska
