= Mount Dech =

Mountain in Alaska, United States

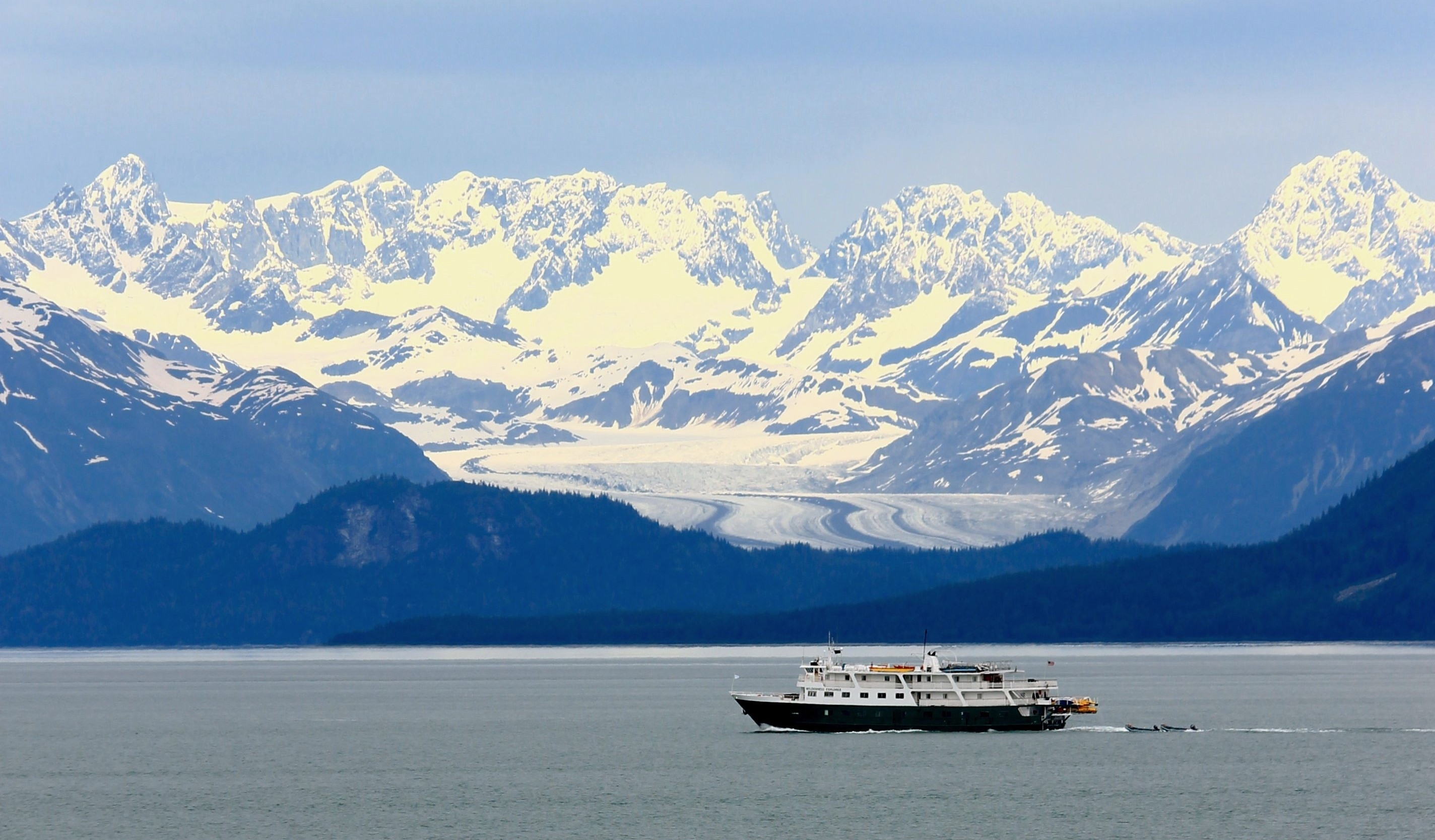
- Mount Dech (far right), from Glacier Bay

Highest point
- Elevation: 7,475 ft (2,278 m)
- Prominence: 1,650 ft (503 m)
- Parent peak: Mount Tlingit Ankawoo
- Isolation: 2.94 mi (4.73 km)
- Coordinates: 59°08′23″N 135°48′14″W

Geography
- Location within Alaska
- Location: Haines Borough; Hoonah–Angoon Census Area
- Country: United States
- State: Alaska
- Protected area: Glacier Bay National Park
- Parent range: Saint Elias Mountains; Takhinsha Mountains
- Topo map: USGS Skagway A-3

Climbing
- First ascent: 1966

Mount Dech is a 7,475-foot-elevation (2,278-meter) mountain summit in Alaska.

== Description ==
Mount Dech is the third-highest peak in the Takhinsha Mountains which are a subrange of the Saint Elias Mountains. It is located 14 miles (23 km) southwest of Haines on the northern boundary of Glacier Bay National Park and Preserve. Precipitation runoff and glacial meltwater from the mountain's north slope drains to the Chilkat River, whereas the south slope drains to Glacier Bay. Although modest in elevation, topographic relief is significant as the summit rises 3,500 feet (1,067 meters) above the Garrison Glacier in one mile (1.6 km). The mountain was named by a group of climbers led by Lawrence E. Nielsen who made the first ascent of the summit on June 19, 1966. The peak's toponym is a Tlingit word meaning "two." The mountain's toponym has not been officially adopted by the United States Board on Geographic Names, and it will remain unofficial as long as the USGS policy of not adopting new toponyms in designated wilderness areas remains in effect.

== Climate ==
According to the Köppen climate classification system, Mount Dech is located in a tundra climate zone with cold, snowy winters, and cool summers. Weather systems coming off the Gulf of Alaska are forced upwards by the Takhinsha Mountains (orographic lift), causing heavy precipitation in the form of rainfall and snowfall. Winter temperatures can drop to 0 °F with wind chill factors below −10 °F. This climate supports the Bertha, Casement, and Garrison glaciers surrounding the peak.

== See also ==
- Geography of Alaska
