= Takhinsha Mountains =

Mountain range in Alaska

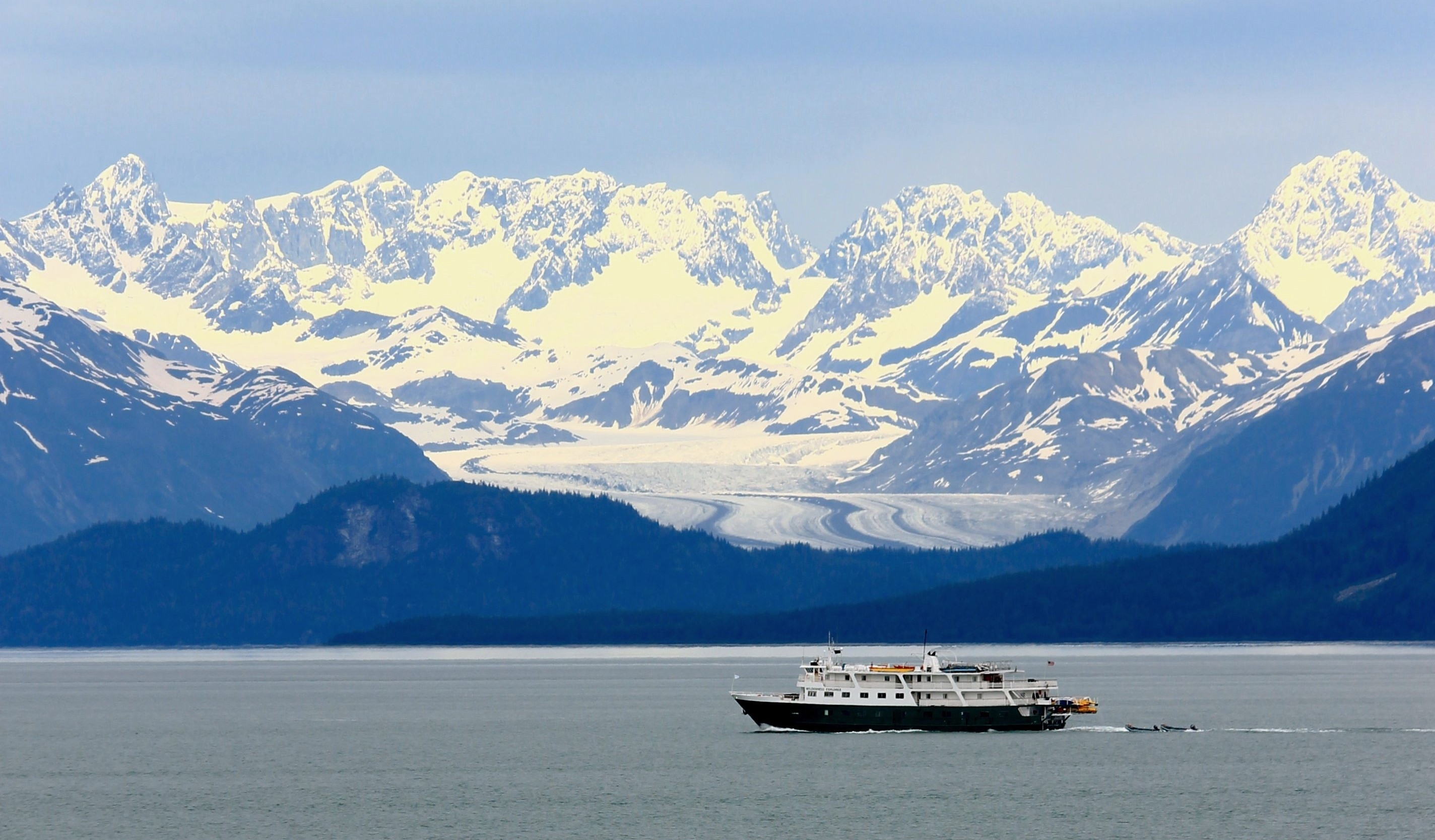
- Takhinsha Mountains and Casement Glacier; Mt. Tlingit Ankawoo far left, Mt. Dech to far right.

Highest point
- Peak: Mount Tlingit Ankawoo
- Elevation: 7,550 ft (2,300 m)
- Coordinates: 59°09′34″N 135°53′09″W

Geography
- Country: United States
- State: Alaska
- Burrough: Haines Borough
- Range coordinates: 59°12′59″N 136°6′19″W

The Takhinsha Mountains are a mountain range in Haines Borough and the Hoonah–Angoon Census Area in the U.S. state of Alaska, in the southeastern part of the state. They extend 40 km (25 mi) west-northwest from the northern end of the Chilkat Range to the head of Riggs Glacier, 46 km (29 mi) southwest of Skagway.

"Takhinsha" is a Tlingit name reported by E. C. Robertson of the U.S. Geological Survey and published in 1952.

The mountains include Mount Tlingit Ankawoo (highest point of range), Mt. Dech (third-highest), and Mt. Krause (fifth-highest), named for geographer Aurel Krause and located 16 miles west-southwest of Haines.
