= Mount Case =

Mountain in Alaska, United States

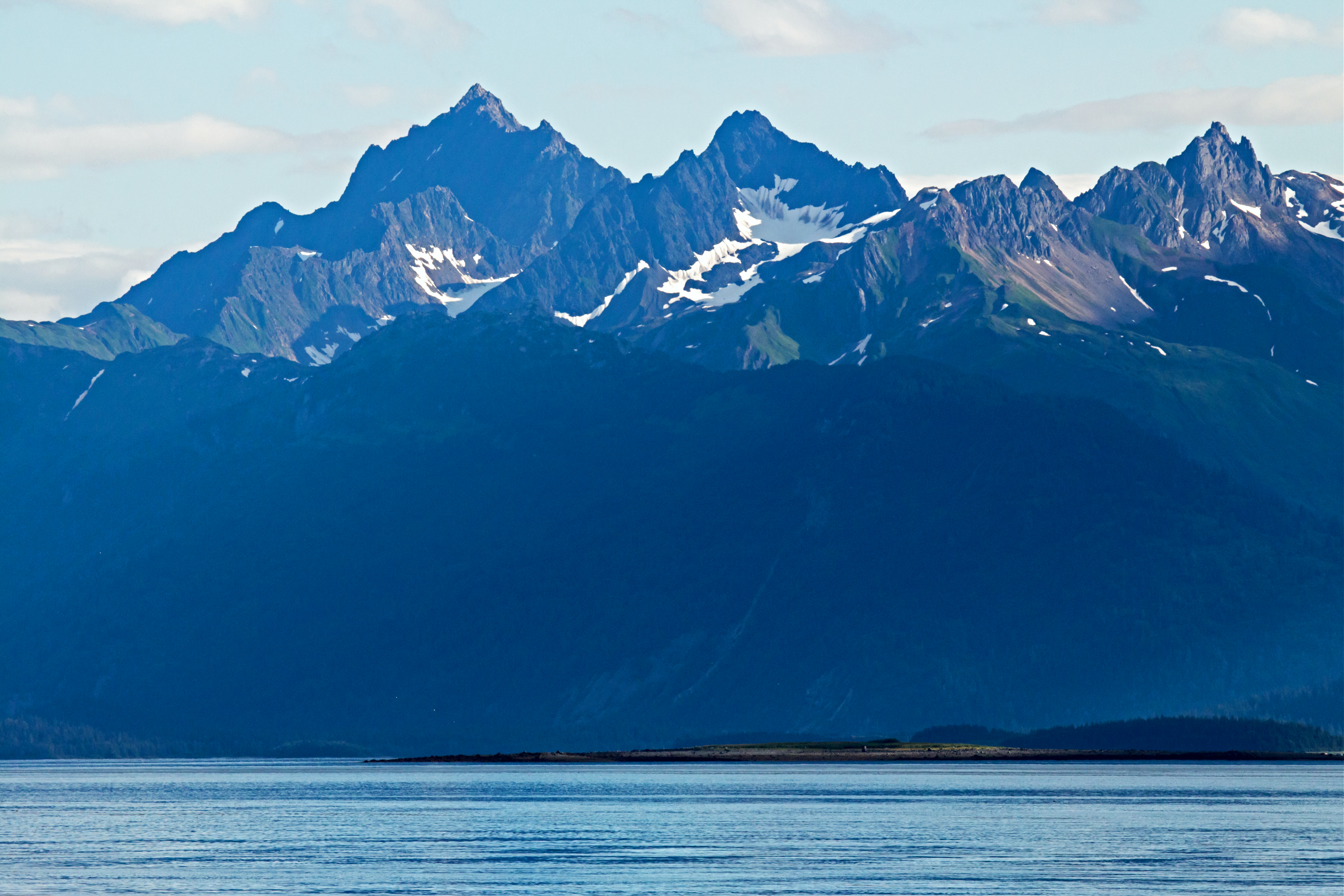
- Mount Case (left of center) from southwest

Highest point
- Elevation: 5,545 ft (1,690 m)
- Prominence: 4,600 ft (1,400 m)
- Isolation: 6.4 mi (10.3 km)
- Coordinates: 58°49′03″N 135°58′12″W

Geography
- Location within Alaska
- Interactive map of Mount Case
- Location: Glacier Bay National Park; Hoonah-Angoon; Alaska, United States
- Parent range: Alsek Ranges; Saint Elias Mountains
- Topo map: USGS Juneau D-6

Climbing
- First ascent: 1965 by David P. Johnston, Pete Robinson
- Easiest route: Climbing North ridge

Mount Case is a prominent 5,545-foot (1,690 m) mountain summit located in the Alsek Ranges of the Saint Elias Mountains, in southeast Alaska. The mountain is situated in Glacier Bay National Park and Preserve, as the highest point between Adams Inlet and White Glacier, 65 mi (105 km) northwest of Juneau, and 2.47 mi (4 km) northeast of Mount Wright, which is the nearest peak. Although modest in elevation, relief is significant as the mountain rises up from tidewater in less than three miles, and it ranks 73rd in prominence for all peaks in Alaska.

The mountain was named in 1890 by Harry Fielding Reid, an American geophysicist, who studied glaciology in Glacier Bay. Reid named this mountain for his school, the Case School of Applied Science, present-day Case Western Reserve University, located in Cleveland, Ohio. The months May through June offer the most favorable weather for viewing or climbing Mount Case. Weather permitting, Mount Case can be seen from Glacier Bay, which is a popular destination for cruise ships.

== Climate ==
Based on the Köppen climate classification, Mount Case has a subarctic climate with cold, snowy winters, and mild summers. Temperatures can drop below −20 °C with wind chill factors below −30 °C. This climate supports the White Glacier below the south slopes. Precipitation runoff from the mountain drains into Glacier Bay Basin.

== Gallery ==
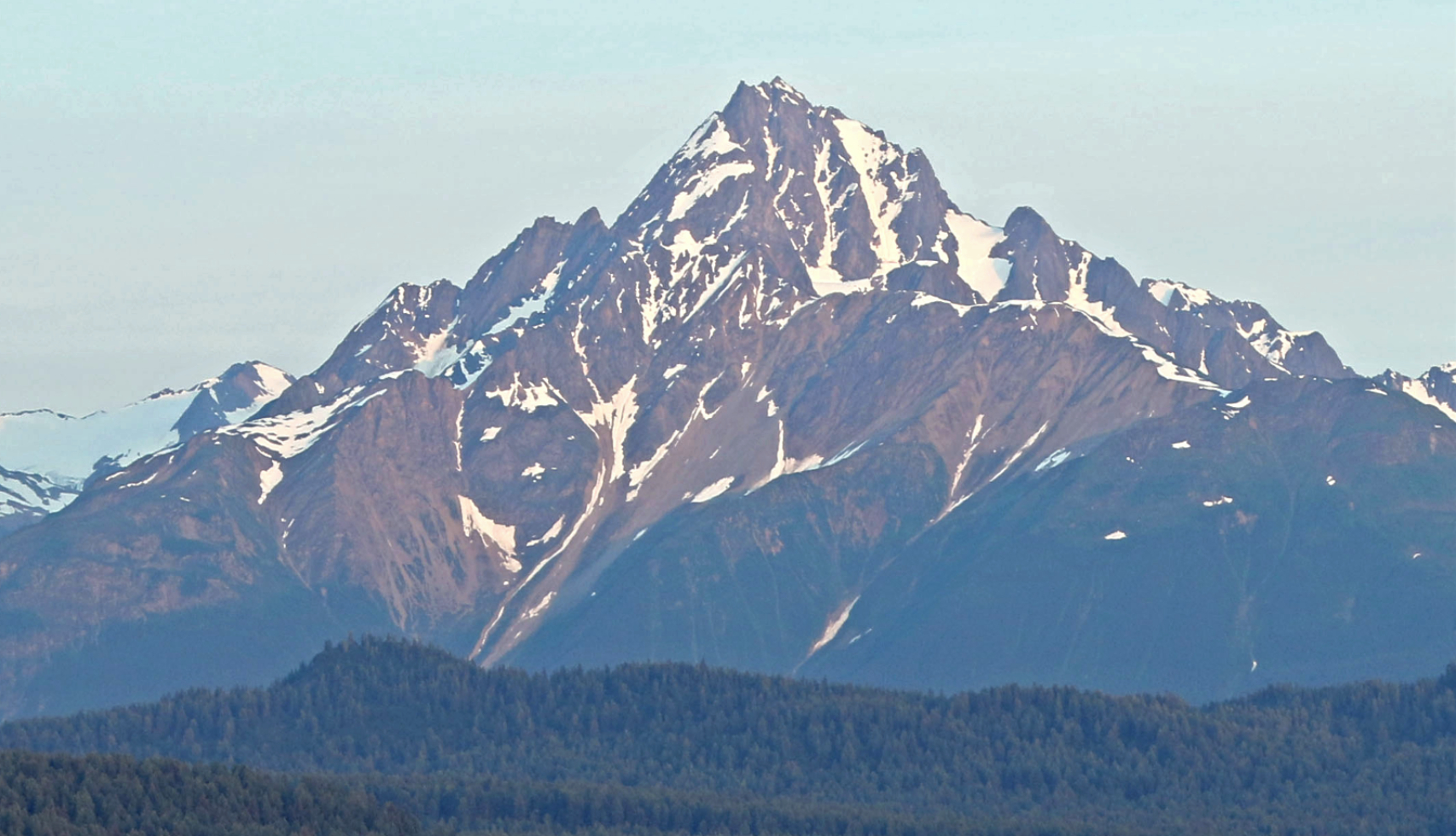
Mount Case, north aspect

== See also ==
- List of mountain peaks of Alaska
- Geography of Alaska
