= Riggs Glacier =

Glacier in Alaska, United States

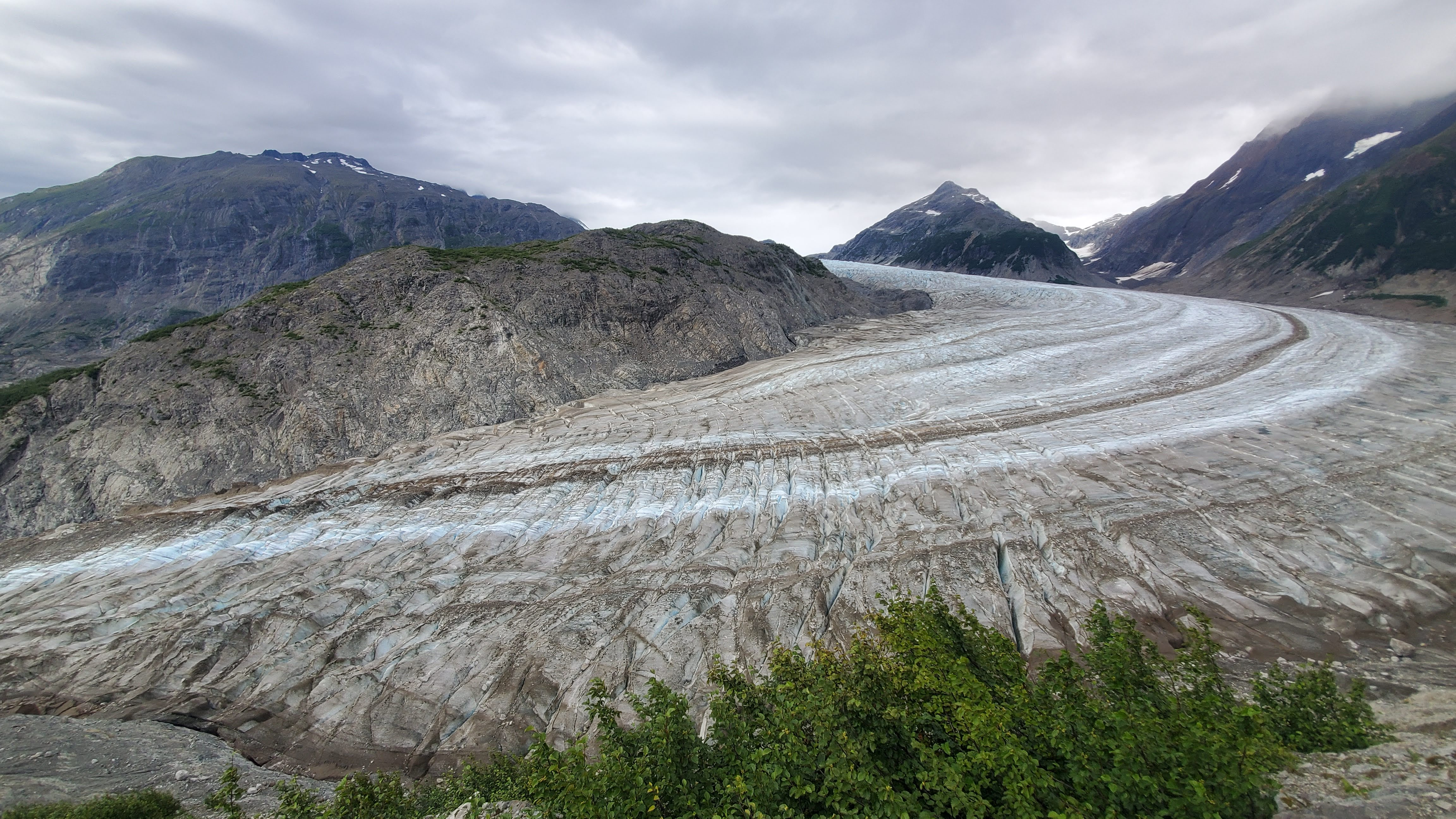
- Riggs Glacier in 2022

- Location within Alaska
- Interactive map of Riggs Glacier
- Type: Mountain glacier
- Location: Hoonah-Angoon Census Area, Alaska, U.S.
- Coordinates: 59°10′08″N 136°14′37″W
- Length: 17-mile (27 km)
- Terminus: sea level
- Status: retreating

Riggs Glacier is a glacier in Glacier Bay National Park and Preserve in the U.S. state of Alaska. It begins on the southern slope of the Takhinsha Mountains, 6 km (4 mi) southeast of Mount Harris and flows south-southeast to the head of Muir Inlet, 69 km (43 mi) southwest of Skagway.

It was named by the American Geographical Society in 1947 for Thomas Riggs, Jr., Governor of Alaska from 1918 to 1921.

== See also ==
- List of glaciers
