= Stickeen: An Adventure with a Dog and a Glacier =

1897 essay by John Muir

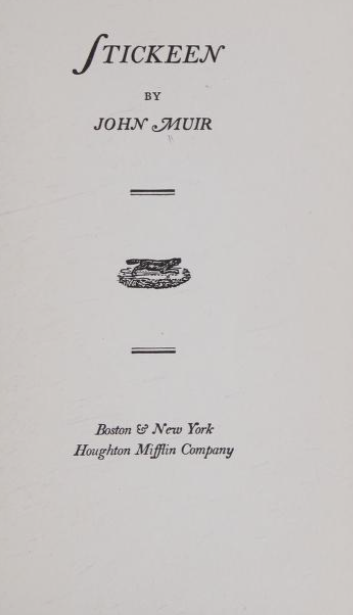
- Title page for Stickeen: An Adventure with a Dog and a Glacier (1909 edition)
- Author: John Muir
- Language: English
- Publication place: United States

"Stickeen: An Adventure with a Dog and a Glacier" (1897) is a short memoir by American naturalist John Muir. It is about a trip he took in Alaska (1880) with a dog named Stickeen and their outing together on a glacier. It is one of Muir's best-known writings, and is now considered a classic dog story.

It was first published in The Century Illustrated Monthly Magazine in September 1897 (V. 54, No. 5), under the title "An Adventure with a Dog and a Glacier". The editor cut out parts of the original manuscript so Muir attempted a reconstruction when it was republished in expanded book form in 1909 as Stickeen. A slightly shortened version of the 1909 edition was published in his 1915 Travels in Alaska. Ronald Limbaugh's book, John Muir's "Stickeen" and the Lessons of Nature (1996) reconstructs the original manuscript submitted by Muir in 1897. Many later editions were printed throughout the 20th century that included artwork, children's adaptions, audio, music and video.

Muir felt it was the hardest thing he ever tried to write. Muir saw Stickeen as "the herald of a new gospel" adding "in all my wild walks, seldom have I had a more definite or useful message to bring back."

== Editions and adaptions ==
"An Adventure with a Dog and a Glacier"
Century Magazine, 1897
00:37:45

- Muir, John (September 1897). "An Adventure with a Dog and a Glacier". Century Illustrated Monthly Magazine. 54 (5): 769–776.
- Alaska Stories (video). Narrated by W. Claud Thompson.
- An Adventure with a Dog and a Glacier. Short Nonfiction Collection (audio). Vol. 21. Narrated by Winston Tharpe. LibriVox. 2011.
- Koehler-Pentacoff, Elizabeth (2003). John Muir and Stickeen: an Alaskan Adventure (Children's picture book). Illustrated by Karl Swanson. Millbrook Press.
- Oliver, Bill (2000). "Me and Stickeen". Friend of the River (music). Dawn Publications.
- Stickeen (audio). Narrated by Sue Anderson. LibriVox. 2008.
- Stickeen (audio). Narrated by Lee Stetson. Wild Productions. 1988.
- Stickeen and John Muir's Other Animal Adventures (audio). Narrated by Garth Gilchrist. Gilchrist.
- Rubay, Donnell. Stickeen: John Muir and the Brave Little Dog (Children's picture book). Illustrated by Christopher Canyon. Dawn Publications.
- Stickeen: John Muir's Classic Tale (audio). Narrated by Lee Salisbury. Haven Books Audio.
- The Tale of Stickeen (audio). Narrated by Gerald Pelrine. John Muir Association.
