= Chilkat Range =

Mountain range in Alaska, U.S.

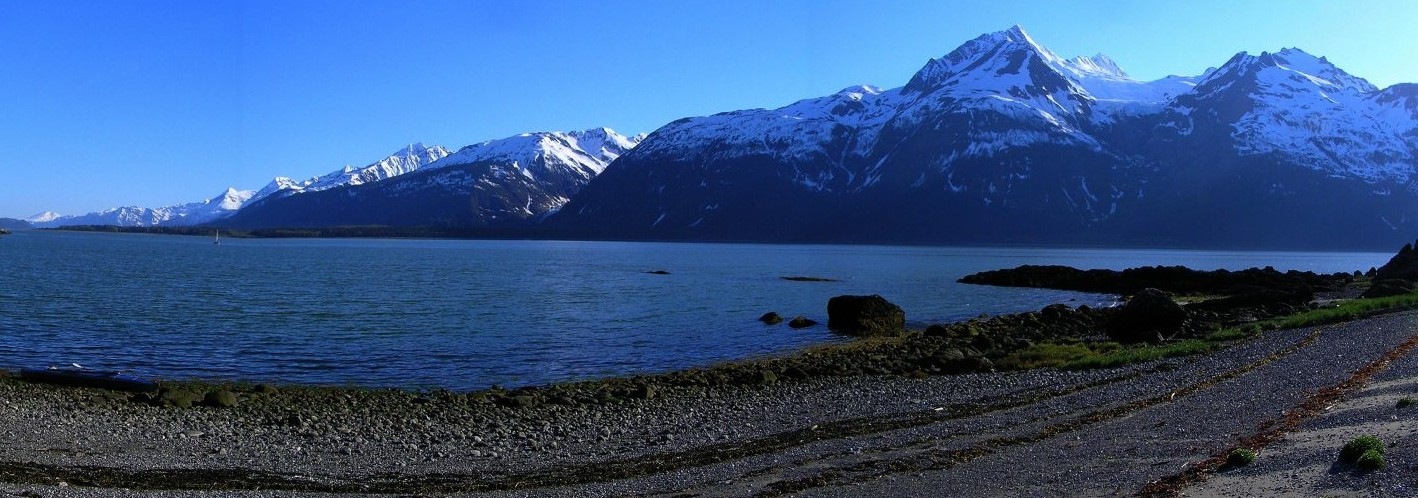

Highest point
- Elevation: 4,268 ft (1,301 m)
- Coordinates: 58°39′6″N 135°28′56″W

Dimensions
- Length: 70 mi (110 km)

Naming
- Etymology: Tlingit

Geography
- Country: United States
- State: Alaska
- Borough: Haines
- Borders on: Glacier Bay National Park

The Chilkat Range is a mountain range in Haines Borough and the Hoonah–Angoon Census Area in the U.S. state of Alaska, west of the city of Juneau.

The Chilkat Range is one of the principal divisors between Haines Borough and Glacier Bay National Park and Preserve. It also separates Chilkat Inlet and Lynn Canal from Muir Inlet in Glacier Bay. The northern boundary is generally considered to be the Klehini River. The unnamed ice field in the range also feeds many glaciers including the Davidson and Rainbow Glaciers.

It was named Chilkat Mountains in 1879 by the USGS for the Chilkat subdivision of the Tlingit People. These mountains were renamed as the Chilkat Range in 1891.

== See also ==
- Mount Golub
- Mount Emmerich
- Nun Mountain
