= Muir Inlet =

Bay in Alaska, US

Coordinates: 58°52′04.1″N 136°05′18.3″W

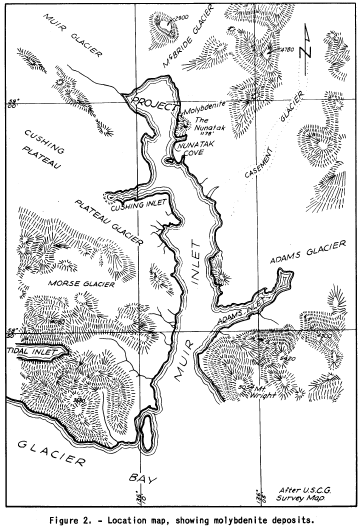
Muir Inlet schematic map.

Muir Inlet is an inlet in Glacier Bay in Alaska in the United States. Muir Inlet heads in Muir Glacier, and extends for 48 kilometers (30 mi) south to Glacier Bay, 51 miles (82 km) northwest of Hoonah, Alaska. Muir Inlet is separated from Chilkat Inlet and Lynn Canal by the Chilkat Range. Muir Inlet has several glaciers' termini in addition to that of Muir Glacier; most prominent among them are Casement Glacier, McBride Glacier, and Riggs Glacier. In the west lies Wachusett Inlet and in the east Adam's Inlet.

Muir Inlet was named in 1883 by the United States Coast and Geodetic Survey for John Muir (1838–1914), who visited the area in 1890.

Muir Inlet is popular kayaking destination.

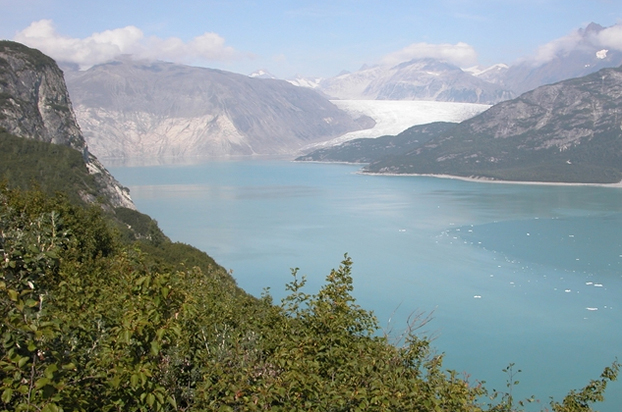
View of Muir Inlet and Muir Glacier.
