= Mount Tlingit Ankawoo =

Mountain in Alaska, United States

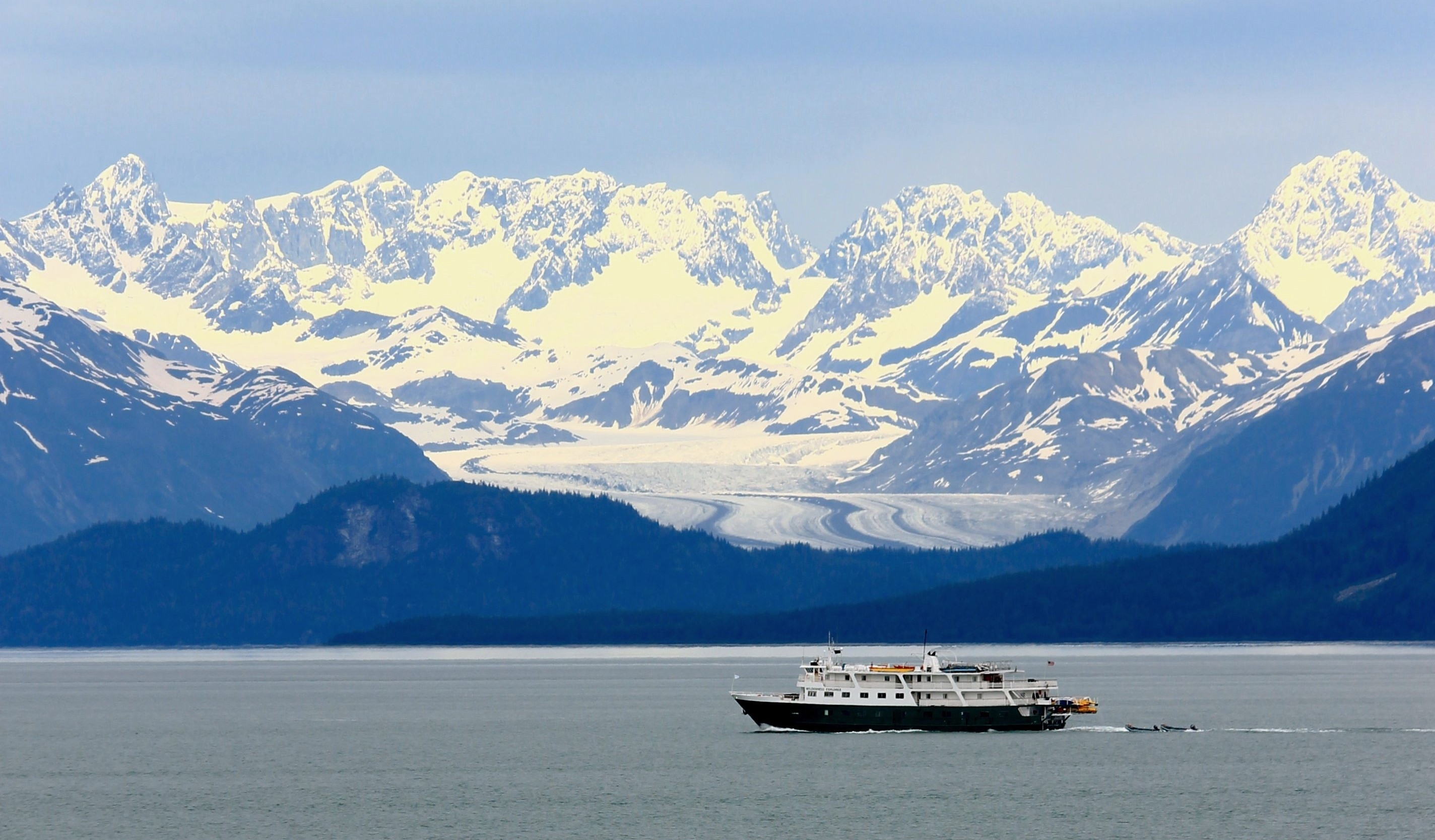
- South aspect (summit far left), from Glacier Bay

Highest point
- Elevation: 7,550 ft (2,301 m)
- Prominence: 3,712 ft (1,131 m)
- Parent peak: Peak 7716
- Isolation: 28.94 mi (46.57 km)
- Coordinates: 59°09′34″N 135°53′09″W

Geography
- Location within Alaska
- Country: United States
- State: Alaska
- Census Area: Hoonah–Angoon
- Protected area: Glacier Bay National Park
- Parent range: Saint Elias Mountains; Takhinsha Mountains
- Topo map: USGS Skagway A-3

Mount Tlingit Ankawoo is a 7,550-foot-elevation (2,301-meter) mountain summit in Alaska.

== Description ==
Mount Tlingit Ankawoo is the highest point of the Takhinsha Mountains which are a subrange of the Saint Elias Mountains. It is located 16 miles (26 km) west-southwest of Haines on the northern boundary of Glacier Bay National Park and Preserve. Precipitation runoff and glacial meltwater from the mountain's north slope drains to the Chilkat River via the Takhin River, whereas the south slope drains to Glacier Bay. Although modest in elevation, topographic relief is significant as the summit rises 4,500 feet (1,372 meters) above the Bertha Glacier in two miles (3.2 km). The mountain was named by a group of climbers led by Lawrence E. Nielsen who were exploring the Takhinsha Mountains in June 1966. They made the first ascent of the north snow summit, but not the rocky true summit, failing two attempts. The peak's toponym is a Tlingit word meaning "The Chief." The mountain's toponym has not been officially adopted by the United States Board on Geographic Names.

== Climate ==
According to the Köppen climate classification system, Mount Tlingit Ankawoo is located in a tundra climate zone with cold, snowy winters, and cool summers. Weather systems coming off the Gulf of Alaska are forced upwards by the Takhinsha Mountains (orographic lift), causing heavy precipitation in the form of rainfall and snowfall. Winter temperatures can drop to 0 °F with wind chill factors below −10 °F. This climate supports the Bertha, Casement, McBride, Garrison, and Willard glaciers surrounding the peak.

== See also ==
- Geography of Alaska
