= Glacier Camp =

- Location of Glacier Camp in British Columbia
- Coordinates: 59°47′00″N 136°36′00″W
- Country: Canada
- Province: British Columbia
- Area codes: 250, 778

Glacier Camp is an uninhabited locality in far northwestern British Columbia, Canada, located on the route of the Haines Highway and the Dalton Trail. During the Klondike Gold Rush, it was a major boomtown-staging ground for travellers bound from Haines, Alaska to the Yukon and also was a mining camp itself. Abandoned today though a few ruins are extant, it is located west of Bennett, British Columbia near the confluence of Mule and Nadahini Creeks. Forming a pass between the basins of the Tatshenshini and Kelsall Rivers, it forms the prominence col for the Devils Paw, a summit in the Boundary Ranges.

== See also ==
- Chilkat Pass
