= List of places in Alaska (M) =

This list of cities, towns, unincorporated communities, counties, and other recognized places in the U.S. state of Alaska also includes information on the number and names of counties in which the place lies, and its lower and upper zip code bounds, if applicable.

Name of place	Number of counties	Principal county	Lower zip code	Upper zip code
McCarthy	1	Valdez-Cordova Census Area	99566	
McCord	1	Kodiak Island Borough		
McGrath	1	Yukon-Koyukuk Census Area	99627	
McGrath Airport	1	Yukon-Koyukuk Census Area	99627	
McGrath-Holy Cross	1	Yukon-Koyukuk Census Area		
McKinley Park	1	Denali Borough	99755	
McKinley Village	1	Yukon-Koyukuk Census Area		
Makushin	1	Aleutians West Census Area		
Manley Hot Springs	1	Yukon-Koyukuk Census Area	99756	
Manokotak	1	Dillingham Census Area	99628	
Marshall	1	Kusilvak Census Area	99585	
Marvel Creek	1	Bethel Census Area	99557	
Mary's Igloo	1	Nome Census Area	99778	
Matanuska	1	Matanuska-Susitna Borough	99645	
Matanuska-Susitna	1	Matanuska-Susitna Borough		
Matanuska-Susitna Borough School District	1	Matanuska-Susitna Borough		
May Creek	1	Valdez-Cordova Census Area	99566	
Meade River	1	North Slope Borough		
Meadow Lakes	1	Matanuska-Susitna Borough		
Meakerville	1	Valdez-Cordova Census Area		
Medfra	1	Yukon-Koyukuk Census Area	99627	
Medfra	1	Yukon-Koyukuk Census Area		
Mekoryuk	1	Bethel Census Area	99630	
Mellicks Trading Post	1	Bethel Census Area	99668	
Mendeltna	1	Valdez-Cordova Census Area		
Mendeltna Lodge	1	Valdez-Cordova Census Area	99645	
Mendenhall	1	City and Borough of Juneau	99801	
Mendenhall Flats	1	City and Borough of Juneau	99801	
Mendenhall Valley	1	City and Borough of Juneau		
Mendenhaven	1	City and Borough of Juneau		
Mentasta	1	Valdez-Cordova Census Area		
Mentasta Lake	1	Valdez-Cordova Census Area	99780	
Meshik	1	Lake and Peninsula Borough		
Metlakahtla	1	Prince of Wales-Outer Census Area		
Metlakatla	1	Prince of Wales-Outer Census Area	99926	
Metlakatla Indian Community	1	Prince of Wales-Outer Census Area		
Meyers Chuck	1	Prince of Wales-Outer Census Area	99903	
Miller House	1	Yukon-Koyukuk Census Area		
Miller Landing	1	Kenai Peninsula Borough		
Millers Landing	1	Kenai Peninsula Borough		
Minto	1	Yukon-Koyukuk Census Area	99758	
Montana	1	Matanuska-Susitna Borough	99676	
Montana Creek	1	Matanuska-Susitna Borough		
Moody	1	Yukon-Koyukuk Census Area		
Moore Creek	1	Yukon-Koyukuk Census Area		
Moose Creek	1	Fairbanks North Star Borough		
Moose Pass	1	Kenai Peninsula Borough	99631	
Moquawkie	1	Kenai Peninsula Borough		
Morzhovoi	1	Aleutians East Borough	99583	
Moses Point Fishing Village	1	Nome Census Area	99762	
Mosquito Lake	1	Haines Borough		
Mountain Point	1	Ketchikan Gateway Borough	99901	
Mountain View	1	Municipality of Anchorage	99508	
Mountain Village	1	Kusilvak Census Area	99632	
Mount Edgecumbe	1	City and Borough of Sitka	99835	
Mount McKinley National Park	1	Yukon-Koyukuk Census Area		
Mud Bay	1	Haines Borough		
Mud Bay	1	Ketchikan Gateway Borough	99901	
Mumtrak	1	Bethel Census Area		
Murphy Dome	1	Fairbanks North Star Borough	99701	
Musk Ox	1	Fairbanks North Star Borough		
Muskwa Village	1	Kenai Peninsula Borough		
Myers Chuck	1	Prince of Wales-Outer Census Area		
