= Mosquito Lake, Alaska =

Mosquito Lake, Alaska Xunt’i Áa (Tlingit)
- Census-designated place
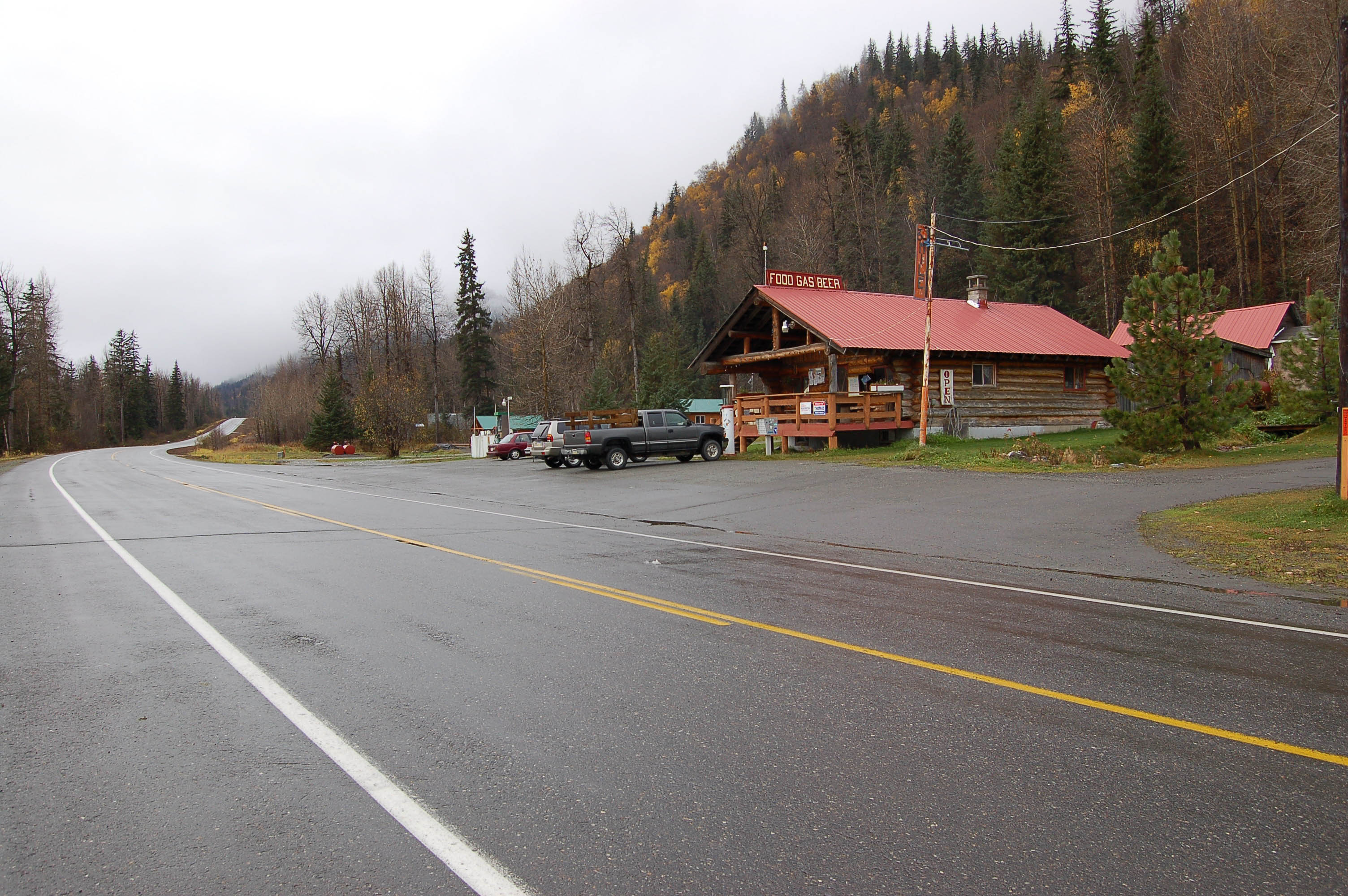
- Haines Highway and Thirty-Three Mile Roadhouse

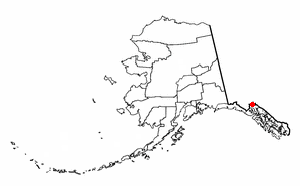
- Location of Mosquito Lake, Alaska
- Coordinates: 59°25′40″N 136°9′48″W
- Country: United States
- State: Alaska
- Borough: Haines

Government
  - Borough mayor: Janice Hill
  - State senator: Jesse Kiehl (D)
  - State rep.: Andi Story (D)

Area
  - Total: 77.61 sq mi (201.02 km^{2})
  - Land: 77.17 sq mi (199.87 km^{2})
  - Water: 0.45 sq mi (1.16 km^{2})
- Elevation: 305 ft (93 m)

Population (2020)
  - Total: 120
  - Density: 1.6/sq mi (0.6/km^{2})
- Time zone: UTC-9 (Alaska (AKST))
  - Summer (DST): UTC-8 (AKDT)
- ZIP code: 99827
- Area code: 907
- FIPS code: 02-50800
- GNIS feature ID: 1866963

Mosquito Lake (Lingít: Xunt’i Áa) is a census-designated place (CDP) in Haines Borough, Alaska, United States. As of the 2020 census, Mosquito Lake had a population of 120.

== Geography ==
Mosquito Lake is located in northern Haines Borough at 59°25′40″N 136°9′48″W (59.427723, -136.163435). It is bordered to the south by the Klehini River, to the west by the Canada–United States border from the Pleasant Camp, British Columbia border crossing north to Rozaunt Creek, to the north by Rozaunt Creek, Nataga Creek, and the Kelsall River, and to the east by the Chilkat River. To the south across the Klehini River is the Covenant Life CDP, and to the west is the Canadian province of British Columbia. Alaska Route 7, the Haines Highway, runs through the southern part of the CDP in the Klehini River valley, leading southeast 25 miles (40 km) to Haines and northwest 120 miles (190 km) to Haines Junction, Yukon Territory.

The CDP takes its name from Mosquito Lake, a small water body next to the Chilkat River in the eastern part of the community, accessible by Mosquito Lake Road from the Haines Highway.

According to the United States Census Bureau, the CDP has a total area of 76.5 square miles (198.1 km^{2}), of which 76.3 square miles (197.6 km^{2}) are land and 0.2 square miles (0.5 km^{2}), or 0.27%, are water.

== Demographics ==
Historical population
Census	Pop.	Note	%±
1990	80		—
2000	221		176.3%
2010	309		39.8%
2020	120		−61.2%
U.S. Decennial Census

Mosquito Lake first reported on the 1990 U.S. Census as a census-designated place (CDP).

As of the census of 2000, there were 221 people, 86 households, and 55 families residing in the CDP. The population density was 2.8 inhabitants per square mile (1.1/km^{2}). There were 126 housing units at an average density of 1.6 per square mile (0.62/km^{2}). The racial makeup of the CDP was 91.40% White, 5.43% Native American, and 3.17% from two or more races.

There were 86 households, out of which 30.2% had children under the age of 18 living with them, 53.5% were married couples living together, 1.2% had a male householder with no husband present, and 34.9% were non-families. 23.3% of all households were made up of individuals, and 3.5% had someone living alone who was 65 years of age or older. The average household size was 2.57 and the average family size was 3.14.

In the CDP, the population was spread out, with 28.1% under the age of 18, 4.5% from 18 to 24, 23.1% from 25 to 44, 39.8% from 45 to 64, and 4.5% who were 65 years of age or older. The median age was 41 years. For every 100 females, there were 125.5 males. For every 100 females age 18 and over, there were 130.4 males.

The median income for a household in the CDP was $34,688, and the median income for a family was $37,500. Males had a median income of $42,917 versus $35,000 for females. The per capita income for the CDP was $16,415. About 30.0% of families and 33.9% of the population were below the poverty line, including 62.3% of those under the age of eighteen and none of those 65 or over.
