= Alaska Route 7 =

Highway in Alaska

Alaska Route 7
- Route 7 highlighted in red

Route information
- Maintained by Alaska DOT&PF
- Length: 144.62 mi (232.74 km) 144.62 mi (in four sections)
- Component highways: South Tongass Highway; North Tongass Highway; Mitkof Highway; Nordic Drive; Egan Drive; Old Glacier Highway (Out the road); Haines Highway

Tongass Highway segment
- Length: 37.1 mi (59.7 km)
- South end: Dead end near Ketchikan
- Major intersections: Alaska Marine Highway in Ketchikan
- North end: Dead end in Ward Cove

Mitkof Highway segment
- Length: 34.21 mi (55.06 km)
- South end: Dead end on Mitkof Island
- Major intersections: Alaska Marine Highway in Petersburg
- North end: Sandy Beach Road in Petersburg

Egan Drive / Glacier Highway segment
- Length: 39.01 mi (62.78 km)
- South end: Franklin Street in Juneau
- Major intersections: Juneau-Douglas Bridge in Juneau; Alaska Marine Highway in Juneau
- North end: Dead end in Juneau

Haines Highway segment
- Length: 39.7 mi (63.9 km)
- South end: Front Street in Haines
- North end: Hwy 3 at the Dalton Cache–Pleasant Camp Border Crossing near Mosquito Lake

Location
- Country: United States
- State: Alaska
- Boroughs: Ketchikan Gateway, Unorganized, Juneau, Haines

Highway system
- Alaska Routes; Interstate; Scenic Byways
← AK-6	→ AK-8

Alaska Route 7 (abbreviated as AK-7) is a state highway in the Alaska Panhandle of the U.S. state of Alaska. It consists of four unconnected pieces which serve some of the Panhandle communities. The Alaska Marine Highway ferries stop in the cities connecting to the Alaska Highway in Yukon via the Haines Highway.

== Route description ==
According to Alaska's supplement to the Federal Manual on Uniform Traffic Control Devices, AK-7 follows (from south to north):

- South Tongass Highway, North Tongass Highway (Ketchikan)
- Nordic Drive, Mitkoff Highway (Petersburg)
- Glacier Highway, Egan Drive (Juneau)
- Haines Highway, Haines to Border

No other segments are shown on maps.

The Alaska Marine Highway ferry service connect the sections, but for the most parts the ports are not located at the endpoint of each segment; thus many of the endpoints are dead ends.

=== Tongass Highway ===
The southernmost piece of AK-7 is known as the Tongass Highway and heads both ways from Ketchikan on Revillagigedo Island. The ferry calls at Ketchikan. Within the city of Ketchikan, it is named Tongass Avenue from the northern city limits at the airport ferry terminal to the Newtown neighborhood. Continuing downtown it is successively Water, Front, Mill and Stedman streets, becoming the Tongass Highway again after passing Coast Guard Base Ketchikan.

=== Mitkoff Highway / Nordic Drive ===
Another section of AK-7 is the Mitkoff Highway. Traveling south from Petersburg to the southeast point of Mitkof Island. AK-7 also includes the short Nordic Drive, connecting the Mitkoff Highway to the north point of the island. Petersburg has a ferry terminal.

=== Egan Drive / Glacier Highway ===
Egan Drive which is part of AK-7, is the main road in Juneau, replacing the Glacier Highway from downtown Juneau to near the Juneau International Airport. Beyond the airport, AK-7 continues along the Glacier Highway past Auke Bay to its northernmost point near Berners Bay. The extreme southern end of Egan Drive is known as Marine Way. The ferry calls at Auke Bay.

There were plans to extend the road north of Berners Bay as the Lynn Canal Highway; however, the project has been indefinitely shelved due to the state's budget crisis.

=== Haines Highway ===
The final piece of AK-7 begins in downtown Haines, another ferry stop; it follows the Haines Highway northwest to the border with British Columbia, Canada. In BC, it continues north as the Haines Highway with no designation, eventually connecting with Yukon Highway 3 (which ends at the Alaska Highway at Haines Junction in the Yukon Territory).

== Major intersections ==
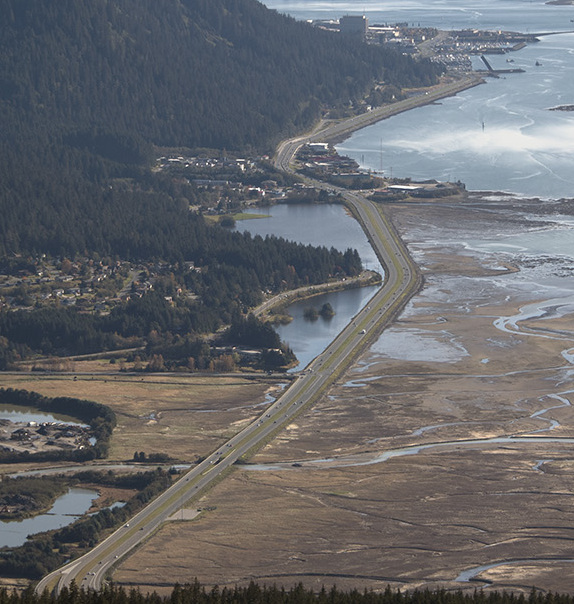
2015 aerial view showing most of Egan Drive, which is the most heavily-traveled segment of Route 7

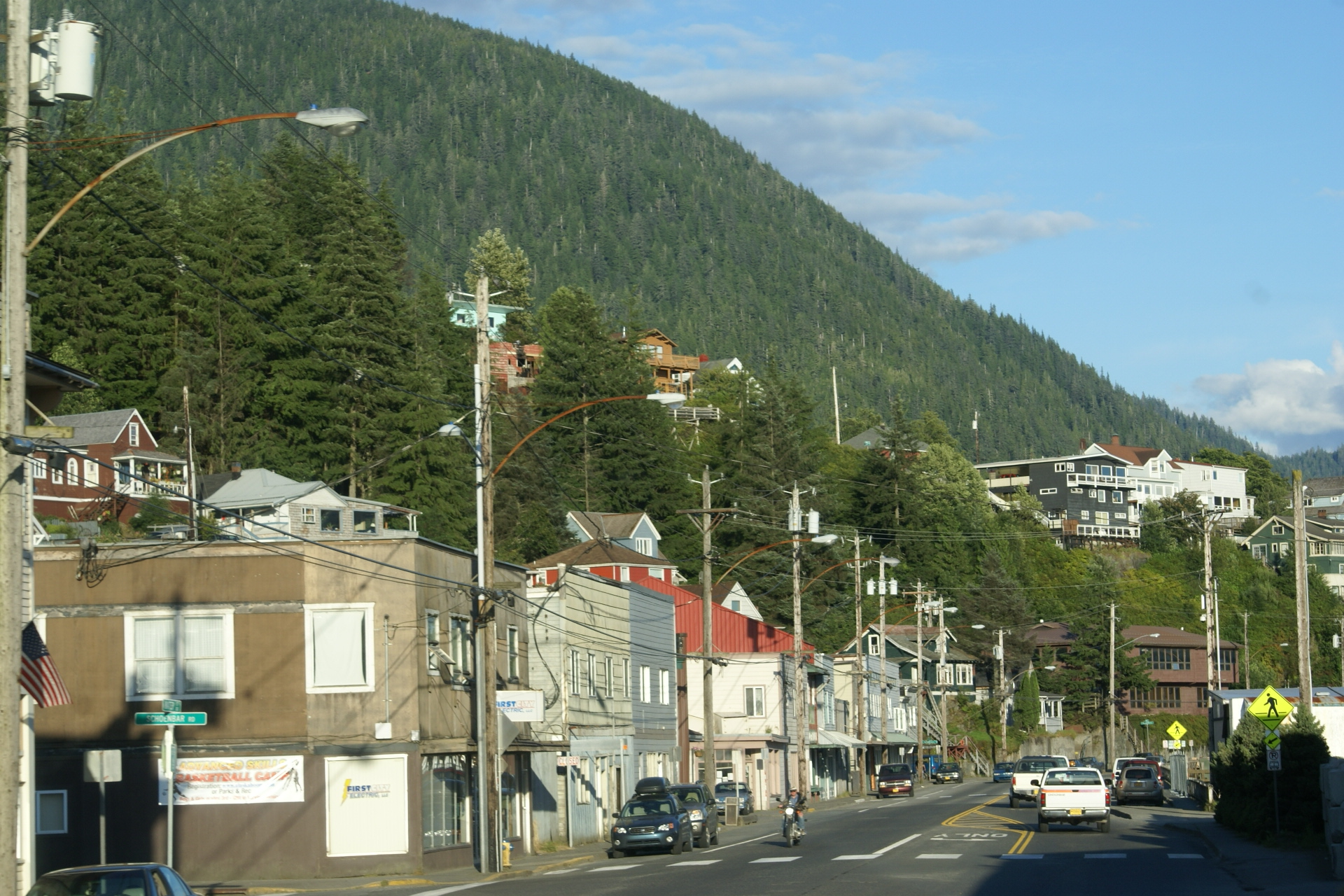
North Tongass Highway, roughly looking east as it passes through a neighborhood just beyond downtown Ketchikan

Borough	Location	mi	km	Destinations	Notes
Ketchikan Gateway		0.00	0.00	Dead end	Beaver Falls access; southern terminus of AK-7/Tongass Highway
Ketchikan Gateway	Ketchikan	15.5	24.9	Ferry Terminal Road — Ketchikan Ferry Terminal	Alaska Marine Highway
Ketchikan Gateway	Ward Cove	31.7	51.0	Dead end	Northern terminus of Tongass Highway
Gap in route
Unorganized	Mitkof Island	0.00	0.00	Dead end	Southern terminus of Mitkof Highway
Unorganized	Petersburg	32.21	51.84	Ferry Terminal Road — Petersburg Ferry Terminal	Alaska Marine Highway
Unorganized	Petersburg	34.21	55.06	Sandy Beach Road east	Nordic Drive turns east and becomes Sandy Beach Road; northern terminus of Mitkof Highway
Gap in route
City and Borough of Juneau		0.00	0.00	Franklin Street — Downtown, Thane	Southern terminus of Egan Drive
City and Borough of Juneau		0.68	1.09	Juneau-Douglas Bridge — Douglas	
City and Borough of Juneau				Glacier Highway Access Road	Interchange
City and Borough of Juneau				Glacier Highway south	AK-7 north overlaps Glacier Highway
City and Borough of Juneau		13.15	21.16	Ferry Terminal Road — Auke Bay Ferry Terminal	Alaska Marine Highway
City and Borough of Juneau		39.01	62.78	Dead end	Beyond Echo Cove access; northern terminus of Glacier Highway
Gap in route
Haines	Haines	0.00	0.00	Front Street to Haines Ferry Terminal	To Alaska Marine Highway; southern terminus of Haines Highway
Dalton Cache–Pleasant Camp Border Crossing		39.7	63.9	Hwy 3 north (Haines Highway)	Canada–United States border; continuation into British Columbia and the Yukon Territory
1.000 mi = 1.609 km; 1.000 km = 0.621 mi
