= Dalton Cache–Pleasant Camp Border Crossing =

Border crossing between Canada and the United States

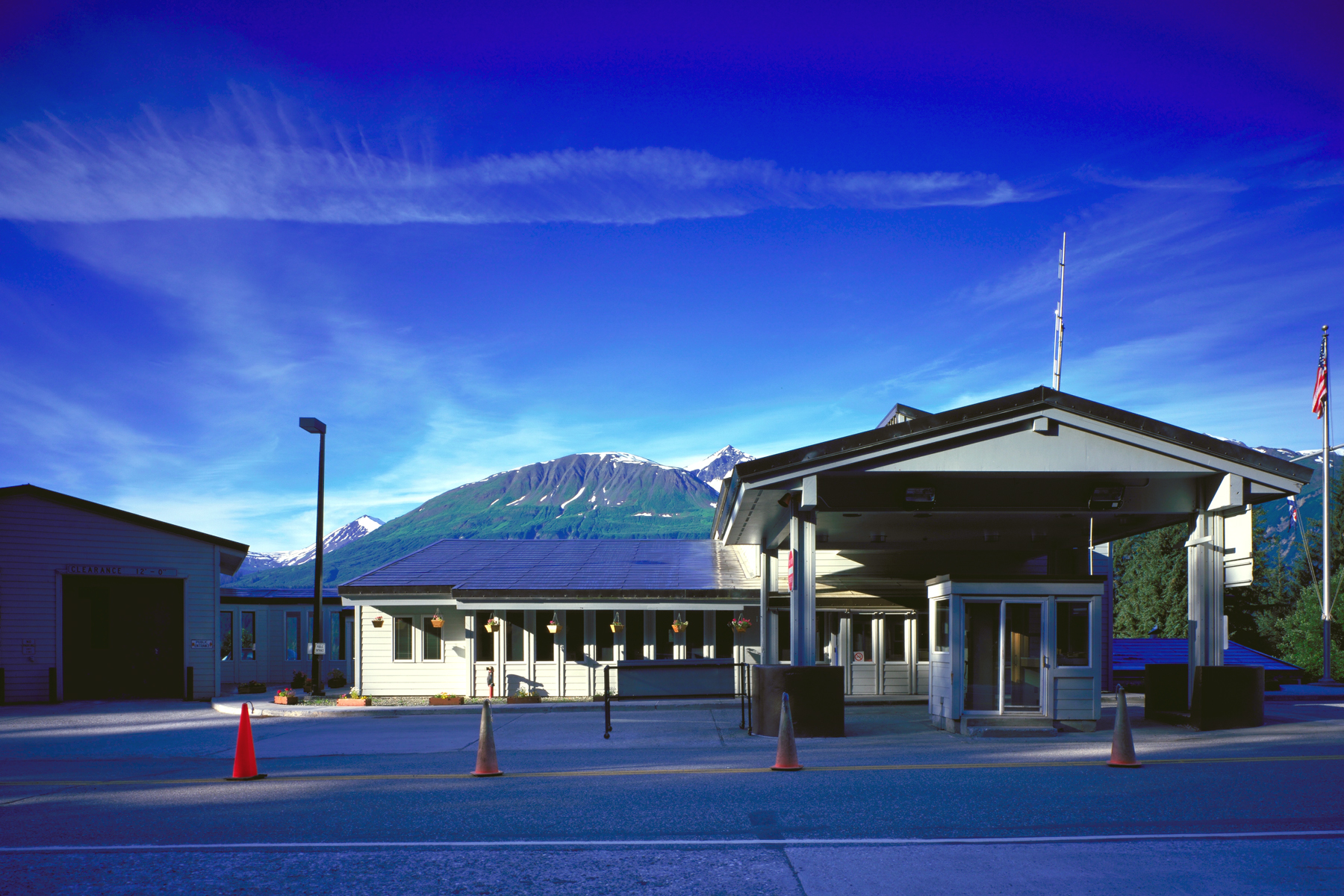
- The United States border station at Dalton Cache

Location
- Country: United States, Canada
- Location: AK-7 / Hwy 3 (Haines Highway); US Port: Mile 42, Haines Highway, Dalton Cache, AK 99827; Canadian Port: Pleasant Camp, British Columbia
- Coordinates: 59°27′02″N 136°21′43″W

Details
- Opened: 1946

Website
- Dalton Cache Port (United States); Pleasant Camp Port (Canada)

The Dalton Cache–Pleasant Camp Border Crossing connects the towns of Haines, Alaska and Haines Junction, Yukon on the Canada–United States border. Alaska Route 7 on the American side joins Yukon Highway 3 on the Canadian side as part of the Haines Highway.

== Route ==
In 1890, Jack Dalton of Skagway improved an historic trail to the interior of Alaska and on to the contiguous United States established by the Chilikat tribe of the Indigenous peoples of the Pacific Northwest Coast. The route, formerly known as the Dalton Trail, had been used for centuries by the indigenous people of the region and was heavily used during the Klondike Gold Rush. Dalton Cache was an inn and trading post at the border. In 2009, Haines Highway was declared a National Scenic Byway.

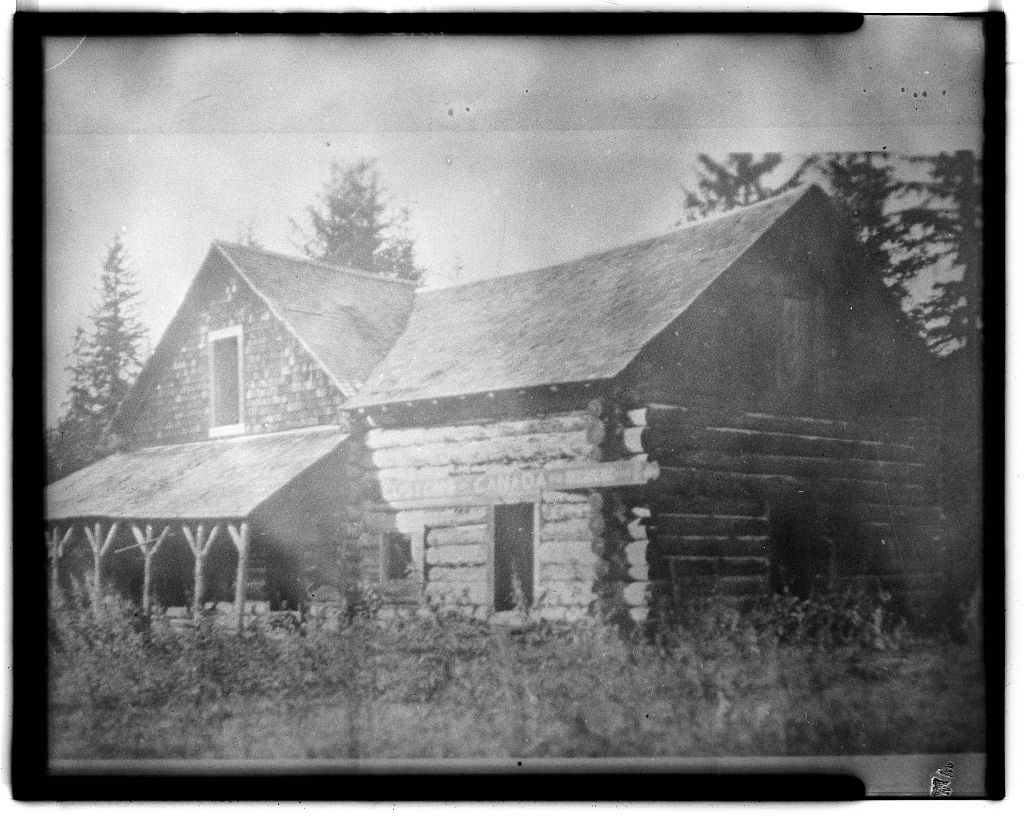
Original Dalton Cache Building

== Canadian side ==
In response to the goldrush, the North-West Mounted Police (NWMP) established an inspection station in 1898 just across the border from Dalton Cache at Pleasant Camp. The functions included collecting customs duties. It is unclear if the officers in charge were wholly NWMP members. In 1901, the office was placed under the administrative oversight of Whitehorse Customs but closed in 1906. The building remained part of the NWMP compound. Canada established a permanent border station at Pleasant Camp in 1946.

== US side ==
Prior to 1986, US Border Inspections were conducted at Haines, which was recognized as inefficient since many people lived and worked between the town and the border 42 miles (68 km) to the north. Construction of the US Border Inspection Station at Dalton Cache involved rehabilitating the historic structures at the border.

The current border station is approximately 40 miles north of Haines.

Haines is one of three communities of southeast Alaska which are only accessible to the rest of Alaska by land by crossing into British Columbia.

== See also ==
- List of Canada–United States border crossings
