= Pleasant Camp, British Columbia =

Coordinates: 59°27′14″N 136°21′52″W

Location of Pleasant Camp in British Columbia

Pleasant Camp is a government facility in the remote Atlin District of northwestern British Columbia, Canada at an elevation of 274.3 metres (900 ft). It is the western-most community in British Columbia (see Extreme communities of Canada). The sole structures are the Port of Entry, staff housing, and maintenance buildings. This location offers no public amenities or services including no public toilets.

The CBSA Port of Entry conducts Customs, Immigration, and Commercial Processing. The border is open from 8am to midnight, 7 days a week, and is open 365 days a year including on holidays.

== Travel ==
The Canada Border Services Agency port of Pleasant Camp is on the Haines Highway/Yukon #3 Highway and is a border crossing between the US and Canada. Visitors must travel 165 km (2 hours drive) along the Haines Highway through the Kluane National Park and Reserve from Haines Junction, Yukon. Pleasant camp is approximately 320 km (4 hours drive) from Whitehorse, Yukon, the nearest major airport and commercial center.

The port of entry to the U.S., about 300 yards (270 m) to the south of Pleasant Camp, is the Dalton Cache–Pleasant Camp Border Crossing.

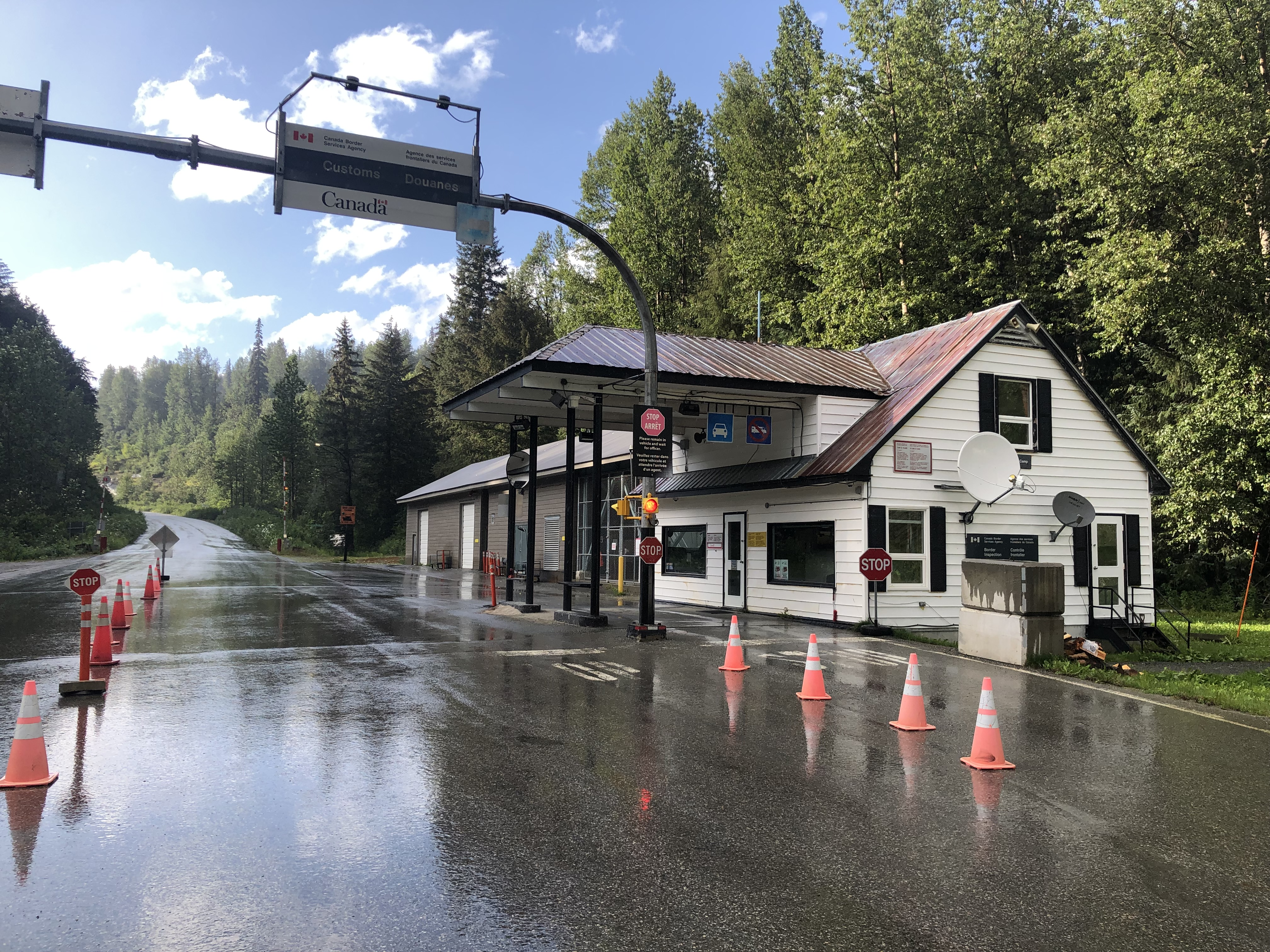

== History ==
In response to the goldrush, the North-West Mounted Police (NWMP) established an inspection station in 1898 at Pleasant Camp. The functions included collecting customs duties. In 1901, the office was placed under the administrative oversight of Whitehorse Customs but closed in 1906. Canada established a permanent border station at Pleasant Camp in 1946.

== Population ==
The population in Spring of 2026 was counted as 11 people. The population fluctuates between 7 and 16, primarily officers of the CBSA and their families, as well as seasonal maintenance staff. There are no schools, community centers, medical services, gas stations, restaurants, grocery stores, or other services in Pleasant Camp, resulting in high resident turnover.

== Flora and Fauna ==
Pleasant Camp lies in one of the most northern extensions of the Coastal Western Hemlock zone. Sitka Spruce is the site's dominant large tree; Western Hemlock and Black Cottonwood are also prominent.

Local wildlife includes grizzly bear, black bear, porcupine, fox, bald eagle, raven, ptarmigan, salmon, dall sheep, and moose.

Hunting is allowed with permit in the local area and game meat is a regular part of the diet of area residents.

It is advisable to carry bear spray when hiking in the area.

== Climate ==
Pleasant Camp has one of the highest snowfall totals in Canada.

Pleasant Camp has a dry-summer subarctic climate (Köppen climate classification: Dsc), though it is extremely atypical of the type in its pronounced summer precipitation minimum, very heavy autumn rainfall, and extreme winter snowfall. The climate is basically, in fact, a cooler and snowier version of the climate found in the mildly shielded southeast Alaskan towns of Juneau and Haines, though the colder winters mean snowfall is among the heaviest on North America at around 7.4 metres (290 in).

Extreme minima are much milder than in interior British Columbia: temperatures have never reached −35 °C (−31 °F) whereas Prince George and Fort St. John though further south have reached −50 °C (−58 °F) during extreme cold periods.

Climate data for Pleasant Camp
| Month | Jan | Feb | Mar | Apr | May | Jun | Jul | Aug | Sep | Oct | Nov | Dec | Year |
|---|---|---|---|---|---|---|---|---|---|---|---|---|---|
| Record high °C (°F) | 7.5 (45.5) | 11.5 (52.7) | 13.5 (56.3) | 20.0 (68.0) | 25.0 (77.0) | 30.5 (86.9) | 32.8 (91.0) | 34.0 (93.2) | 24.5 (76.1) | 18.0 (64.4) | 10.0 (50.0) | 6.5 (43.7) | 34.0 (93.2) |
| Mean daily maximum °C (°F) | −5.0 (23.0) | −1.9 (28.6) | 1.8 (35.2) | 7.4 (45.3) | 13.6 (56.5) | 18.3 (64.9) | 19.9 (67.8) | 18.3 (64.9) | 12.6 (54.7) | 5.6 (42.1) | −1.9 (28.6) | −3.7 (25.3) | 7.1 (44.8) |
| Daily mean °C (°F) | −7.9 (17.8) | −5.4 (22.3) | −2.3 (27.9) | 2.7 (36.9) | 7.8 (46.0) | 12.3 (54.1) | 14.5 (58.1) | 13.3 (55.9) | 8.7 (47.7) | 2.8 (37.0) | −4.6 (23.7) | −6.4 (20.5) | 3.0 (37.4) |
| Mean daily minimum °C (°F) | −10.8 (12.6) | −8.9 (16.0) | −6.3 (20.7) | −2.0 (28.4) | 2.0 (35.6) | 6.2 (43.2) | 9.1 (48.4) | 8.3 (46.9) | 4.7 (40.5) | 0.1 (32.2) | −7.3 (18.9) | −9.0 (15.8) | −1.2 (29.8) |
| Record low °C (°F) | −32.0 (−25.6) | −31.1 (−24.0) | −27.0 (−16.6) | −17.5 (0.5) | −5.0 (23.0) | −2.0 (28.4) | 0.5 (32.9) | 0.5 (32.9) | −8.5 (16.7) | −19.0 (−2.2) | −31.0 (−23.8) | −32.2 (−26.0) | −32.2 (−26.0) |
| Average precipitation mm (inches) | 200.4 (7.89) | 139.1 (5.48) | 106.2 (4.18) | 69.7 (2.74) | 51.9 (2.04) | 37.4 (1.47) | 35.8 (1.41) | 72.4 (2.85) | 148.8 (5.86) | 188.1 (7.41) | 160.0 (6.30) | 217.3 (8.56) | 1,426.9 (56.18) |
| Average rainfall mm (inches) | 35.0 (1.38) | 27.8 (1.09) | 23.6 (0.93) | 48.9 (1.93) | 49.4 (1.94) | 37.4 (1.47) | 35.8 (1.41) | 72.4 (2.85) | 148.0 (5.83) | 153.0 (6.02) | 32.0 (1.26) | 39.8 (1.57) | 703.1 (27.68) |
| Average snowfall cm (inches) | 165.4 (65.1) | 111.4 (43.9) | 82.6 (32.5) | 20.8 (8.2) | 2.6 (1.0) | 0.0 (0.0) | 0.0 (0.0) | 0.0 (0.0) | 0.8 (0.3) | 35.0 (13.8) | 128.0 (50.4) | 177.4 (69.8) | 723.8 (285.0) |
| Average precipitation days (≥ 0.2 mm) | 17.3 | 13.5 | 11.7 | 11.9 | 12.3 | 11.3 | 11.9 | 16.0 | 19.4 | 20.7 | 15.3 | 18.5 | 179.9 |
| Average rainy days (≥ 0.2 mm) | 2.7 | 2.4 | 4.0 | 9.4 | 12.1 | 11.3 | 11.9 | 16.0 | 19.4 | 17.8 | 3.0 | 3.9 | 114.0 |
| Average snowy days (≥ 0.2 cm) | 16.0 | 12.2 | 9.4 | 4.2 | 0.5 | 0.0 | 0.0 | 0.0 | 0.4 | 5.0 | 13.1 | 16.7 | 77.5 |
