= Covenant Life =

Covenant Life may refer to:

- Covenant Life, Alaska, United States
- Covenant Life Church, a 2800+ member "reformed charismatic" church in Gaithersburg, Maryland
