= Eek, Alaska =

Eek Ekvicuaq
- City
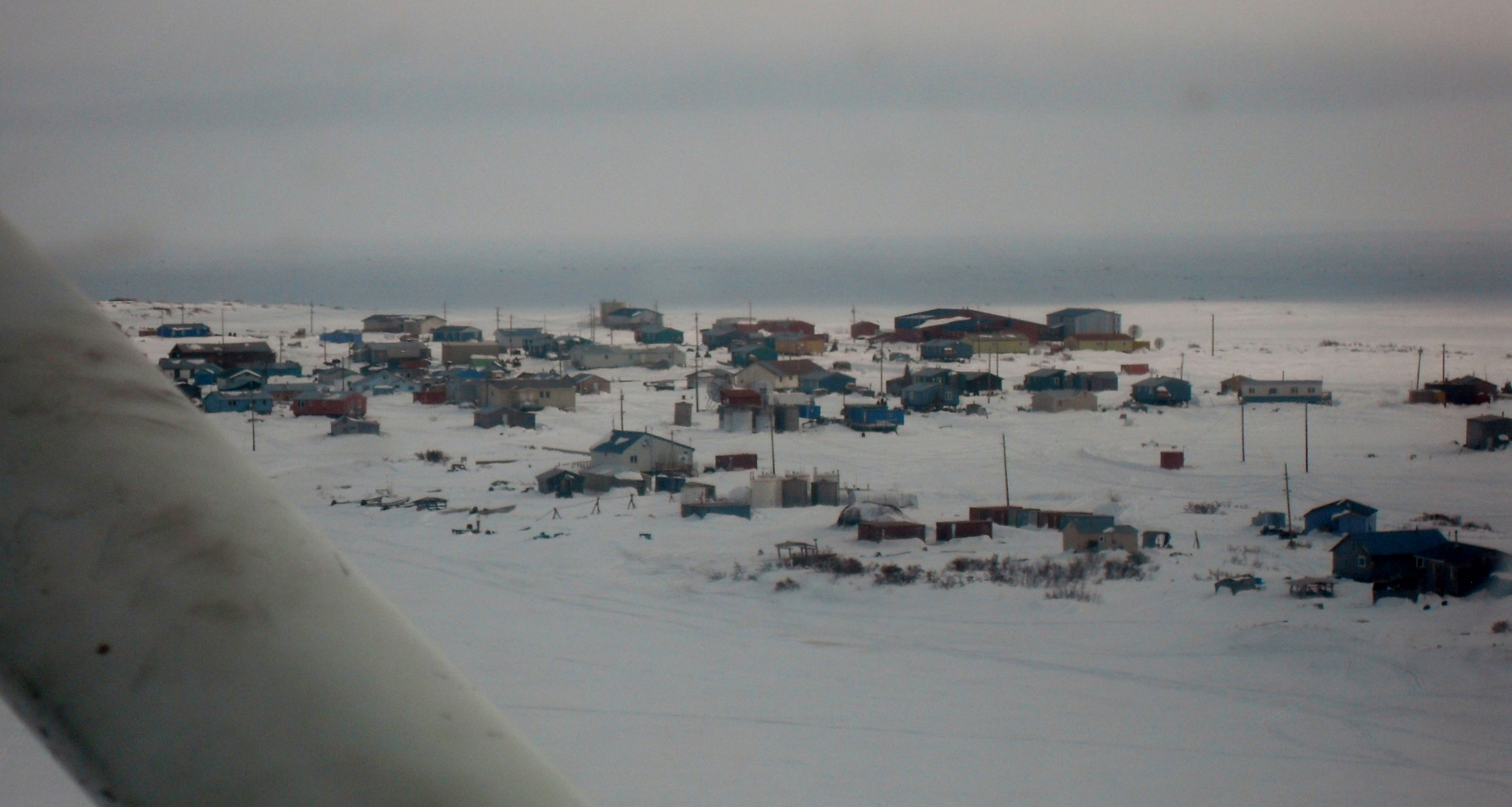
- Eek, Alaska, from a bush plane

- Location in Alaska
- Coordinates: 60°13′7″N 162°1′33″W
- Country: United States
- State: Alaska
- Census Area: Bethel
- Incorporated: July 9, 1970

Government
  - Mayor: Carlie Beebe
  - State senator: Lyman Hoffman (D)
  - State rep.: Conrad McCormick (D)

Area
  - Total: 0.74 sq mi (1.92 km^{2})
  - Land: 0.65 sq mi (1.68 km^{2})
  - Water: 0.093 sq mi (0.24 km^{2})
- Elevation: 3.3 ft (1 m)

Population (2020)
  - Total: 404
  - Density: 623.7/sq mi (240.83/km^{2})
- Time zone: UTC-9 (Alaska (AKST))
  - Summer (DST): UTC-8 (AKDT)
- ZIP codes: 99578
- Area code: 907
- FIPS code: 02-21040
- GNIS feature ID: 1401666

Eek (/iːk/; Central Yupik: Iik) is a city in Bethel Census Area, Alaska, United States. As of the 2020 census there were 404 residents, the majority being Alaska Natives.

== Toponymy ==
Eek is derived from a Yupik word meaning "two eyes". It has been noted on lists of unusual place names.

== Geography ==
Eek is located at 60°13′7″N 162°1′33″W (60.218662, -162.025928). It lies along the Eek River.

According to the United States Census Bureau, the city has a total area of 1.0-square-mile (2.6 km^{2}), of which 0.9-square-mile (2.3 km^{2}) is land and 0.1-square-mile (0.26 km^{2}) (12.38%) is water.

== Services ==
Eek is serviced primarily by the Eek Airport. A second (former) airport east of the village is the current site of a cellular transmission tower, but the runway remains in marginally usable condition and is occasionally used by private aircraft. A town dock provides access to the Eek River, which feeds into the Kuskokwim providing access to most surrounding villages by boat. During winter months many residents utilize travel by snow machine and trails are laid out between the villages in the area. Trails from Eek run to Quinhagak to the south, Tuntutuliak to the west and the Bethel area to the north.

Airfare to the nearest large town, Bethel, is expensive, running about $250 in 2020. This severely limits medical care and governmental access.

Houses in Eek are not numbered, which makes gaining identification difficult for residents.

== Education ==
Lower Kuskokwim School District operates the Eek School, a bilingual PreK-12 school. As of 2018, it has 120 students and six teachers. The Principal is Troy Poage and the school board President is Clarence Daniel. About $21,000 is spent per pupil. In 2020 the state awarded $34.4 million to create a new school in Eek to reduce severe classroom overcrowding, a result of a quickly growing population. It is expected to be finished in 2022.

Two teachers at the Eek School, Paul and Eloise Forrer, compiled a large collection of photos of Eek and surrounding villages, as well as a film entitled The Children of Eek and their art. Their work, dating mostly from the 1970s to 1990s, is held at the Anchorage Museum.

== Demographics ==
Historical population
Census	Pop.	Note	%±
1920	119		—
1930	100		−16.0%
1940	170		70.0%
1950	141		−17.1%
1960	200		41.8%
1970	186		−7.0%
1980	228		22.6%
1990	254		11.4%
2000	280		10.2%
2010	296		5.7%
2020	404		36.5%
U.S. Decennial Census

Eek Village was originally located on the Apokak River and moved to its present location in the late 1920s, after flooding and erosion caused the people to relocate. In 1900 Census, the village was known as "Apokagamiut" and had 118 residents. by 1910, the number of residents declined to 68. Eek appeared on the 1920 U.S. Census as an unincorporated village. In the 1930 Census, the village was enumerated in the Alaska Territory Fourth Judicial District, Bethel District, 0015. with 100 residents in 18 households. It received a post office in 1949. It was formally incorporated in 1970.

=== 2020 census ===
As of the 2020 census, Eek had a population of 404. The median age was 28.0 years. 34.7% of residents were under the age of 18 and 11.6% of residents were 65 years of age or older. For every 100 females there were 94.2 males, and for every 100 females age 18 and over there were 97.0 males age 18 and over.

0.0% of residents lived in urban areas, while 100.0% lived in rural areas.

There were 107 households in Eek, of which 52.3% had children under the age of 18 living in them. Of all households, 43.0% were married-couple households, 27.1% were households with a male householder and no spouse or partner present, and 21.5% were households with a female householder and no spouse or partner present. About 21.5% of all households were made up of individuals and 10.3% had someone living alone who was 65 years of age or older.

There were 120 housing units, of which 10.8% were vacant. The homeowner vacancy rate was 2.0% and the rental vacancy rate was 0.0%.

Racial composition as of the 2020 census
Race	Number	Percent
White	6	1.5%
Black or African American	0	0.0%
American Indian and Alaska Native	371	91.8%
Asian	0	0.0%
Native Hawaiian and Other Pacific Islander	0	0.0%
Some other race	0	0.0%
Two or more races	27	6.7%
Hispanic or Latino (of any race)	5	1.2%

=== 2000 census ===
As of the census of 2000, there were 280 people, 76 households, and 57 families residing in the city. The population density was 307.2 inhabitants per square mile (118.6/km^{2}). There were 83 housing units at an average density of 91.1 units per square mile (35.2 units/km^{2}). The racial makeup of the city was 3.21% White, 95.71% Alaska Native/Yupik, and 1.07% from two or more races. 0.36% of the population were Hispanic or Latino of any race.

There were 76 households, out of which 43.4% had children under the age of 18 living with them, 50.0% were married couples living together, 19.7% had a female householder with no husband present, and 25.0% were non-families. 25.0% of all households were made up of individuals, and 5.3% had someone living alone who was 65 years of age or older. The average household size was 3.68 and the average family size was 4.54.

In the city, the age distribution of the population shows 41.1% under the age of 18, 10.4% from 18 to 24, 27.9% from 25 to 44, 14.3% from 45 to 64, and 6.4% who were 65 years of age or older. The median age was 24 years. For every 100 females, there were 120.5 males. For every 100 females age 18 and over, there were 117.1 males.

The median income for a household in the city was $17,500, and the median income for a family was $27,500. The per capita income for the city was $8,957. About 32.7% of families and 28.8% of the population were below the poverty line, including 30.5% of those under the age of 18 and 10.0% of those 65 or over.

=== Other statistics ===
In 2020, more than three-quarters of the students at the Eek School were below the poverty line.

== Economy ==
Most households rely on traditional native subsistence.

== Infrastructure ==
Prior to 2019, the city did not have running water. Water was distributed by truck to households, at a cost of 25 cents per five gallons. In light of health concerns over the lack of running water, the Alaska Native Tribal Health Consortium helped the city by providing a grant for piped running water, which was completed in 2019.

The city has only one non-satellite internet provider, General Communication Inc.
