= Chilkat Pass =

Mountain pass in the United States and Canada

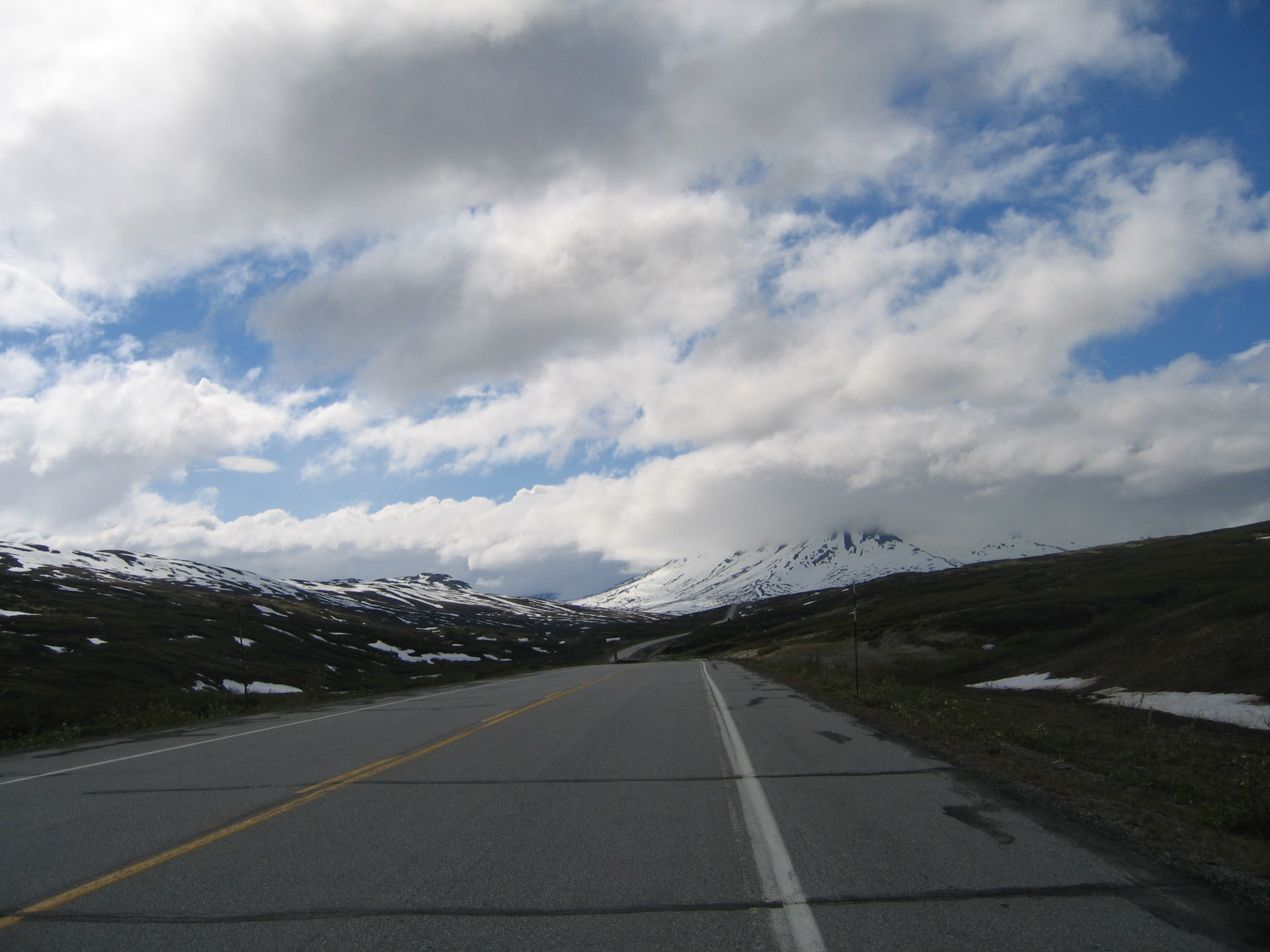
- Haines Highway at the Chilkat Pass

- Location within Alaska Location within British Columbia
- Elevation: 1,070 m (3,510 ft)
- Traversed by: Haines Highway

Location
- Coordinates: 59°40′9.5″N 136°33′26.2″W
- Topo map: NTS 114P10 Nadahini Creek

The Chilkat Pass is a mountain pass on the border of Alaska, United States, and the province of British Columbia, Canada, at the divide between the Klehini (S) and Kelsall Rivers just northwest of Haines, Alaska. At an elevation of 3510 ft (1070 m), it is used by the Haines Highway and was the route used by the Dalton Trail during the days of the Klondike Gold Rush. It also marks the boundary between the Coast Mountains and Saint Elias Mountains.

The pass is named for the Chilkat subgroup of the Tlingit people, who reside in the Haines area and until the gold rush controlled use of the route.

== See also ==
- Chilkoot Pass
- White Pass
