= Lynn Canal Highway =

Highway in Alaska, United States

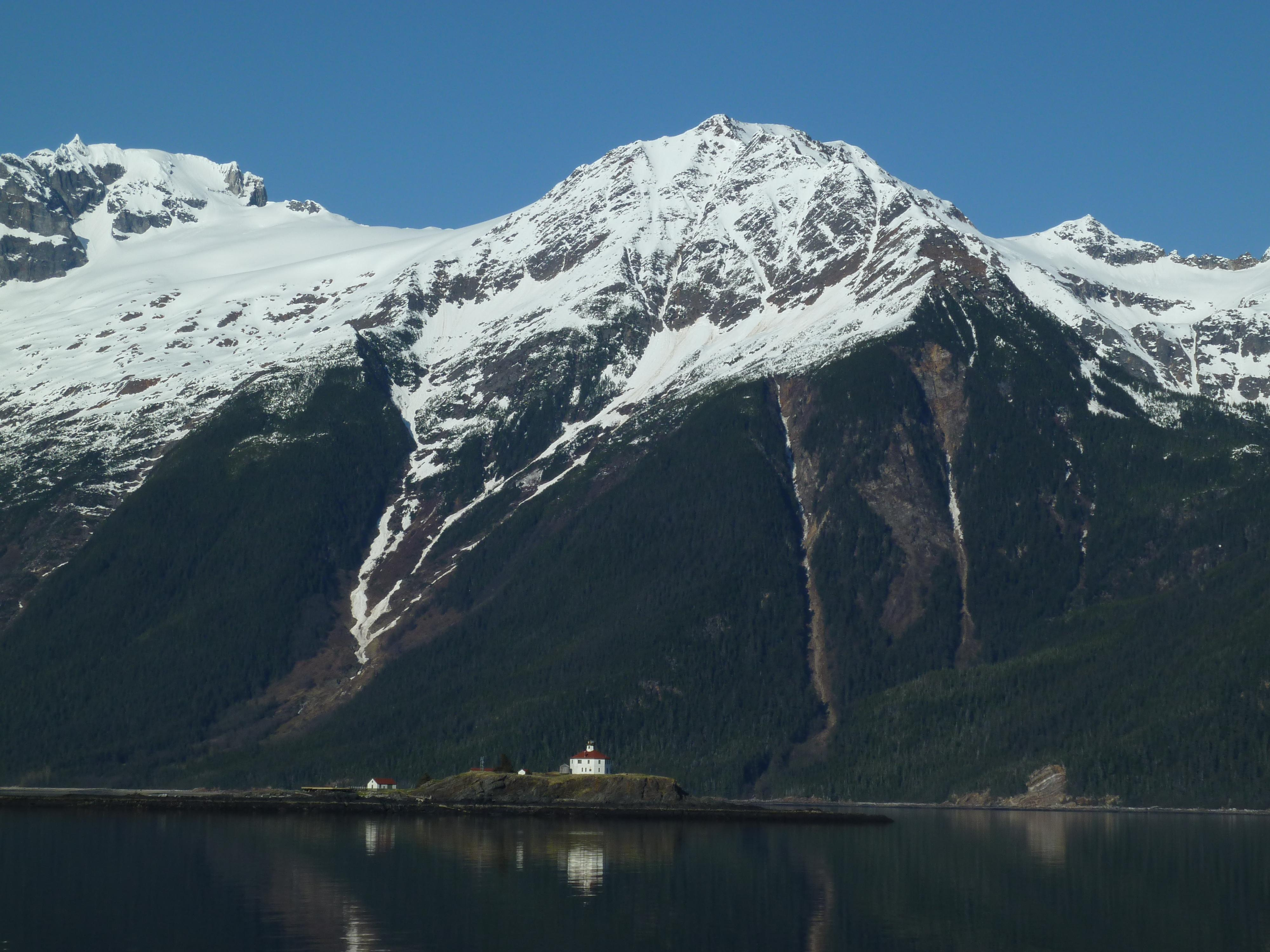
Lynn Canal, showing a few of the numerous avalanche chutes along the proposed route

The Lynn Canal Highway, or Juneau Access Road, is a proposed road between Skagway and Juneau, the capital of the U.S. state of Alaska. Such a road, if built, would still require ferry access to connect Juneau to the Alaskan highway network. The new road would be 47.9 miles long, built at an estimated cost of $574 million, and be a part of Alaska Route 7. The plan of the Alaska Department of Transportation & Public Facilities (DOT&PF) called for extending "The Road" northward from Juneau to a ferry terminal 18 miles south of Skagway. The corridor crosses Berners Bay LUD II which is a congressionally designated roadless area created by the Tongass Timber Reform Act (TTRA). The act permits crossing LUD IIs when the governor of the State of Alaska designates routes as essential transportation corridors. The proposed road skirts the shore of a northwestern section of Alaska's Inside Passage, which was recently named a National Scenic Waterway. As of 2017, the project has been indefinitely shelved due to the state's budget crisis.

== History ==
Juneau has been served by the Alaska Marine Highway ferry system since 1959. In 1987, citing "more than 15 years" of project work, Alaska senator Jim Duncan won federal funding to study nine options that would provide road or road/ferry access to Juneau. The previous year's Southeast Transportation Plan had cited prices ranging from $231.5 million to $440 million, with annual costs from $2.1 million to $12 million, depending mostly on the length of the road.

Starting in the early 1990s, the Alaska Department of Transportation & Public Facilities (DOT&PF) initiated the Juneau Access Improvements Project, intended to improve surface access between Juneau and communities further north. Because of the proposed routing, DOT&PF needed to obtain approvals and permits from several federal agencies and obtain an environmental impact statement. A draft of this report was issued in 1997 followed by a period of public comment and analysis. This process was halted in January 2000 by former governor Tony Knowles due to the high costs of the project. The next governor, Frank Murkowski, ordered the completion of the environmental impact statement in December 2002, resulting in a supplemental draft EIS in January 2005 which was finalized in January 2006.

Alignment along the preferred route incurred a loss of 70 acres of wetlands, 68 acres of old-growth forest, the possibility of up to a 26% reduction in the brown bear habitat, and disturbances to bald eagle nesting territory. The report was disputed by the Southeast Alaska Conservation Council, who claimed that the report violated several federal environmental acts by failing to propose improvements to the existing ferry system, and DOT&PF intervened as a defendant. In 2009, the court ordered the environmental impact statement to be rewritten. The state lost its options to appeal the ruling and in 2011 began work on a new draft supplemental environmental impact statement (SEIS), which was completed in September 2014. The public comment period on the SEIS, originally set to close on November 10, 2014, was extended until November 25, 2014.

Citing the state’s multi-billion dollar financial crisis, Gov. Bill Walker announced on December 15, 2016, that the state is no longer backing construction of the Juneau Access Improvements Project.

== Proposed alignment ==
The preferred route selected by the DOT&PF would be constructed according to Alternative 2B, as outlined in the environmental impact statement. This option includes 47.9 miles of new highway along the east shore of the Lynn Canal, to run from Echo Cove (at the current terminus of the Glacier Highway) to a new ferry terminal (at 59°13′N 135°19′W) at the mouth of the Katzehin River, along Chilkoot Inlet. Ferry service from the Katzehin terminal would extend to Haines, on the opposite bank of Chilkoot Inlet, as well as Skagway, approximately 18 miles to the north.

== See also ==
- Juneau, Alaska §Juneau Access Project
