= Covenant Life, Alaska =

- Census-designated place
- Location in Alaska
- Coordinates: 59°24′0″N 136°4′35″W
- Country: United States
- State: Alaska
- Borough: Haines

Government
  - Borough mayor: Janice Hill
  - State senator: Jesse Kiehl (D)
  - State rep.: Andi Story (D)

Area
  - Total: 27.25 sq mi (70.58 km^{2})
  - Land: 27.05 sq mi (70.07 km^{2})
  - Water: 0.20 sq mi (0.51 km^{2})
- Elevation: 259 ft (79 m)

Population (2020)
  - Total: 25
  - Density: 0.93/sq mi (0.36/km^{2})
- Time zone: UTC-9 (Alaska (AKST))
  - Summer (DST): UTC-8 (AKDT)
- ZIP code: 99827
- Area code: 907
- FIPS code: 02-17670
- GNIS feature ID: 1866938

Covenant Life is a census-designated place (CDP) in Haines Borough, Alaska, United States. At the 2020 census the population was 25, down from 86 at the 2010 census.

It is a community of people with common religious beliefs, with a panel of church elders who set policy for the community's common church, K-12 school, and private 4-year university, and a loose form of self- (municipal) government. An emphasis on community living is a key value in their lifestyle, such as taking most meals together in a common meeting place. The community was established during a Christian religious movement in the 1960s and 1970s, where many such communities were established in Alaska and Canada, with emphasis on self-sufficiency and at least partial agricultural independence. The latter lends to the term often used by outsiders as "The Farm", in reference to a single such community. Modern technology is not forbidden, nor discouraged, but due to remoteness and complete lack of public utilities, it is present much less so than in American and Canadian culture.

== Geography ==
Covenant Life is located in northern Haines Borough at 59°24′0″N 136°4′35″W (59.400046, -136.076433), between the Klehini River to the north and the Tsirku River to the south. The eastern end of the CDP is at the Chilkat River. Covenant Life is bordered by the Mosquito Lake CDP to the north and by the community of Klukwan to the east. The turnoff to Covenant Life from Alaska Route 7 is 25 miles (40 km) northwest of Haines.

According to the United States Census Bureau, the CDP has a total area of 27.2 square miles (70.5 km^{2}), of which 27.1 square miles (70.1 km^{2}) are land and 0.2 square miles (0.5 km^{2}), or 0.64%, are water.

== Demographics ==
Historical population
Census	Pop.	Note	%±
1990	47		—
2000	102		117.0%
2010	86		−15.7%
2020	25		−70.9%
U.S. Decennial Census

Covenant Life first appeared on the 1990 U.S. Census as a census-designated place (CDP).

As of the census of 2000, there were 102 people, 25 households, and 22 families residing in the CDP. The population density was 3.9 people per square mile (1.5 people/km^{2}). There were 38 housing units at an average density of 1.5 per square mile (0.58/km^{2}). The racial makeup of the CDP was 94.12% White, 0.98% Native American, 3.92% Asian, and 0.98% from two or more races.

There were 25 households, out of which 44.0% had children under the age of 18 living with them, 84.0% were married couples living together, 4.0% had a female householder with no husband present, and 12.0% were non-families. 4.0% of all households were made up of individuals, and none had someone living alone who was 65 years of age or older. The average household size was 4.08 and the average family size was 3.59.

In the CDP, the population was spread out, with 26.5% under the age of 18, 15.7% from 18 to 24, 18.6% from 25 to 44, 32.4% from 45 to 64, and 6.9% who were 65 years of age or older. The median age was 35 years. For every 100 females, there were 75.9 males. For every 100 females age 18 and over, there were 63.0 males.

The median income for a household in the CDP was $34,167, and the median income for a family was $41,250. Males had a median income of $36,875 versus $22,083 for females. The per capita income for the CDP was $14,326. There were 4.5% of families and 15.2% of the population living below the poverty line, including no under eighteens and 12.5% of those over 64.

== See also ==
- The Move (Sam Fife)
