= The Move (Sam Fife) =

Christian denomination in the United States

The Move (also known as The Move of the Spirit or Move of God) is the unofficial name of a non-denominational charismatic Christian church group that was started in the 1960s in Florida by Sam Fife, a former Baptist preacher.

In his ministry in the early 1960s, Sam Fife used elements of charismatic ministry, first at his church in New Orleans, then in his prayer group in Miami, Florida. He was a former Baptist preacher and his theology has been compared to that of the Body of Christ movement. At a time of searching by young people and social disruption, Fife's teachings inspired groups throughout the United States, Canada and, later, other countries. Considered by some to be an apostle, under the concept of the Fivefold Ministry, Fife attracted a group of ministers who believed his vision of the role of the church in the "end times".

In the fall 1971, Fife began to preach what was referred to as the "Wilderness Message." Within a few years, thousands of his followers had moved to a number of communal farms, mostly in Alaska, Canada, and Colombia. They followed various practices in combining their resources in common. Sam Fife wrote numerous booklets about his beliefs, which were distributed among members of The Move. At the age of 54, he died with three of his followers in the "Body of Christ" in a plane crash in Guatemala on April 26, 1979.

Following Fife's death, his teachings were carried on by other ministers in The Move, notably C. E. "Buddy" Cobb. In 1982, Cobb and others founded Covenant Life College, with sites in Georgia, Alaska and Canada. In the first decades of the 21st century, The Move's traveling ministers operate under the name International Ministerial Association (IMA). Small groups of The Move continue to operate in rural areas as well as in many cities throughout the US and other countries, but their numbers have declined since the late 1990s.

== History ==
In 1963 in Miami, FL, Sam Fife received what he considered a true, divine relegation after which he began preaching and started groups around the country. The non-denominational groups became known as "The Move of God" or simply "The Move." This soon spread to Canada and then other international locations.

The groups began to move to wilderness locations for the coming of the end of the world including Alaska, Canada and South America. By 1974, there were approximately 40,000 members.

Sam Fife died in a plane crash in 1979, but the movement carried on without him with the help of "Move Elders" who continued the teachings of Fife.

The number of people involved in The Move has been in a long, slow decline, which began in the early 1980s with the closing of some Move farms in British Columbia (BC), Canada. In the early 1990s, by contrast, farms in northern BC attracted new members, or groups set up new sites, with some of the communes numbering over 100 people, many of them youth.

Don Murphy, a Hutterite, reported on visiting Blueberry Farm in January 1994, where 140 adherents of the late Sam Fife's teachings ran a community. He noted that the community's members gave half of their income to it and generally dressed conservatively. Members needed the leaders' permission to go into town, even if they were using their own cars.

He was favorably impressed by the outlook and spiritual vitality of the communities in British Columbia, writing, "It seems to me that these people probably are like the Hutterites were at the time of Jacob Hutter and Peter Reidemann - very strong in faith and close to God." He faulted them for not adhering more strictly to New Testament rules about divorce and women's roles.

The apparent revival lasted about ten years, before people began to leave again in the late 1990s. Since then, some of the farms have closed, some are reduced in population, and some thrive.

Some ex-members have criticized The Move, and reported suffering physical, sexual and psychological abuse at the hands of its leaders and elders while they were still involved with this group. More than 300 people formerly associated with The Move and a similar group, I'SOT, have traded stories in the Sam Fife/Move Yahoo! Group started in 2005.

The forum has provided a venue for considerable discussion of widely varied views and experiences within The Move. Four members wrote an open letter to the ministry of The Move, which they published on the internet in order to publicize the abuses that allegedly had occurred there.

Many other members claim to have endured long-term social, psychological, and spiritual damage, usually stemming from the Move's teachings of complete submission to leadership, whose members have sometimes created an impure and corrupt system.

Reports have been made of financial exploitation in the form of work without pay and encouragement for members to turn over life savings to The Move.

Some critics and former members have characterized The Move as a cult.

== Teachings ==
The Move's teachings gradually changed. As one observer said, "Alongside that word was a revelation of 'Christ in you,' with a vision of overcoming all things, but through the last several years before I left that fellowship, 'doing what He says' had triumphed over 'Christ revealed in us.'"

=== 'Divine Order' teaching ===
Sam Fife's vision and teaching on what he called Divine Order became the guiding principle that characterized the Move's authority structure. He wrote the following in explication:

"This is ... the move of God in which God is bringing forth a many-membered manchild to govern the world, through whom Christ will govern the world during the millennium that is to come. Therefore, we are in God's school of Divine Government, and God is training us as one many-membered man, teaching us, training us, preparing us to be the government through whom the Spirit of Christ will govern the world. The way that he is teaching us and training us is by letting us practice on one another, by teaching us to govern one another and to be governed by one another after the order of Melchisedec, which is a theocratic spirit government order."

"Now that governmental order, at this point, is a five fold spirit ministry governmental order consisting of apostles, prophets, evangelists, elders or pastors (those two terms are synonymous) and teachers."

"What God wants...is a group of elders to be His government that can disagree with one another, but in the right spirit, the humble sweet gracious Spirit of Christ and in the divine order that God has established for disagreeing with one another and thereby be one another's perfect check and balance."

=== Doctrine of Sinless Perfection ===
After Fife's death in a plane crash 1979, Buddy Cobb (1925 – 2017) led the group. He developed the concept that the goal of the Christian is a life of "sinless perfection." According to Cobb, this place of Christian maturity is attainable only through a growing personal relationship with God the Father. When one begins hearing God's voice, and following his counsel, sanctification and holiness grow in the believer's life. Cobb stressed that believers will be saved by his (Christ's) life, as expounded in the teaching "Dead to Sin":

"Therefore, what are you saved by? His life! What are you saved from by His life? Saved from living your own life and when you live your own life you are always living in sin. There is only one way to get out of sin, that is to get into His life. The life in which there is no sin...

If you are not saved from your sins yet, you’re not yet saved...

Now if you were living unto God, you would no longer be living unto sin?... Because sin is our work, righteousness is His work. You can see how theologians got confused with the scriptures and tried to cut works out of salvation all together. Since it is on the basis of grace, it is not on the basis of works. That is a bunch of baloney. The truth is, that you will never be saved but by total obedience to God."

== Culture ==
Following a doctrine of separation from the world, women in The Move traditionally have worn dresses or skirts. Most men kept their hair short and shaved off facial hair. This was a common practice among most Move communes until after the year 2000.

Another practice now discarded is "walking out a year," a concept that is similar to that of courtship. The couple is not allowed to be physically affectionate or hold hands, or spend time alone together. At the end of a year, if the couple wants to marry and the elders approve and confirm the match with visions from the prophetic ministry, the couple may proceed to marry. The details of the rules vary from farm to farm.

Members who do not live on the communal farms often congregate in groups, numbering from a half dozen to several dozen people, and they sometimes hold meetings in people's houses. Such regular small meetings are punctuated by large gatherings which are called Conventions, which are held several times a year. At these conventions, several hundred people meet for several days in order to praise and worship God, and listen to the preaching of the elders in the traveling ministry. The traveling ministry consists of elders who travel from group to group and from convention to convention, with special messages. They are often highly respected by the rest of the community's members, while community elders are the day-to-day leaders of the groups.

Conventions have been held in Bowens Mill, Georgia; Lubbock, Texas; Shepherd's Inn, British Columbia; Upsala, Ontario, and various other locations throughout the world.

== Criticism ==
Critics say that although The Move teaches that everyone is free to hear from and be led by God, in practice the actions of its members must be approved by the local ministry. They believe that, in practice, members must submit to the rules of the local ministry or be labelled divisive and rebellious.

On a radio interview that aired in 2019, former group member Vennie Kocsis related her experiences growing up on two separate compounds after her mother was lured into the group in 1973. Kocsis stated that leaders and members subjected her and other children to child labor, neglect, beatings, and for some children, even sexual molestation. Vennie's mother was sent along with the children to one of the group's demon deliverance compounds in Massachusetts where she lived for four years. They were then moved up to the interior of Alaska. Vennie Kocsis wrote a memoir entitled, "Cult Child," in which she details her experiences growing up in The Move.

An episode of People Magazine Investigates: Cults features ex-member Cara Cobb and Move child abuse survivors Priscilla Roberts and Richard Kiers.

== See also ==
- Covenant Life, Alaska
- Latter Rain (post–World War II movement)
- Sam Fife
