= Sam Fife =

American minister

Samuel Drew Fife Jr. (September 1, 1925 – April 26, 1979) was an ex-Baptist preacher who founded and became the principal leader of an international non-denominational Charismatic Christian group known as "The Move" and the "Body of Christ". Fife's followers regard him as a modern-day apostle and prophet.

== Early life and ministry ==
Sam Fife was born in 1925 in Miami, Florida, the son of Samuel Drew Fife, Sr., and Maude Iva Cox. He served in the U.S. Navy in World War II.

He graduated from New Orleans Baptist Theological Seminary in March 1957 and received the Baptism in the Holy Spirit experience while pastoring Bible Baptist Church in the city.

He was called to Miami, where his first church called "The Miami Revival Center" was located in an old frame building on 22nd Street. Following a period of self-admitted deception, in 1963 while attending prayer meetings, Fife felt he had received the true divine revelation. He began preaching and starting up new groups throughout the United States. The network of assemblies came to refer to themselves loosely as "the move of God" or more frequently, "the move" to avoid denominational connotations.

In fall 1971, believing the Tribulation and Second Coming of Christ were near, Fife began to preach a message that the end-time saints must go to "the wilderness" "to the place God had prepared for the woman." Soon after, thousands of his followers left their homes, jobs, and security and moved to locations in Canada, Colombia, and Alaska to establish communal farms in isolated areas. These "end time farms" were the beginning of a new direction of Fife's ministry.

Fife and three of his American followers died on April 26, 1979 when the private airplane he was piloting through heavy fog crashed into a mountainside in Guatemala. He is buried in the Guatemalan city of Quetzaltenango. He had preached a doctrine of immortality, and taught that the aging process had stopped for him. When asked his age he would simply answer "I AM." He assured people that he would never die but was in the process of being changed into an incorruptible life.

== Teachings ==
Espousing a similar hermeneutic to those of Latter Rain Movement proponents George Warnock and Bill Britton, much of Sam Fife's teachings were based upon metaphorical meanings of passages in the Old Testament, such as the Tabernacle of Moses, the Feast of Tabernacles, Gideon's 300, as well as various verses in the New Testament such as the Manifestation of the sons of God.

Fife believed that the time was drawing close for a group of believers to reach a state of sinless perfection, through a process of God's dealings with them, and manifest who God is to the world. That process, he believed, was through the work of the Fivefold ministry. In his booklet The Manifestation of the Sons of God, Fife interprets Ephesians 4:11–13 in the following way:

"The fact that these ministries were given for the perfecting of the saints makes it clear that these ministries will not pass away until the saints have been perfected ... It is also clear that God purposes for the last day saints to come to perfection here and become the manifested sons of God of Romans 8 who shall deliver the earth from 'the bondage of corruption'."

In his book One Corporate Man, Sam Fife states:

"Therefore let all men know, that in this dispensation of the fullness of times, God is going to fulfill His purpose to bring together into one, all things that are in Christ, both in the earth and in heaven, and make of all the twos, one new many-membered man, who lives after the order of Melchisedec. When He has finished preparing this many-membered man, He is going to purge the earth of every other man by His Judgment Day, and there will come in a new age, and a new earth, with a new man living in a new order, where every member is so dead to self that he lives unto the rest of the Body, and that order shall perpetuate eternal life."

== See also ==
- The Move
- Latter Rain (post-World War II movement)
