= Endicott River Wilderness =

Protected area in Alaska, United States

- IUCN category Ib (wilderness area)
- Location within Alaska
- Location: Haines Borough, Alaska, USA
- Nearest city: Gustavus, Alaska
- Coordinates: 58°46′28″N 135°31′26″W
- Area: 98,729 acres (39,954 ha)
- Established: 1980
- Governing body: United States Forest Service

Endicott River Wilderness is a 98,729-acre (39,954 ha) wilderness area in the U.S. state of Alaska. Designated by the United States Congress in 1980 in a provision of the Alaska National Interest Lands Conservation Act, it is located within the Tongass National Forest and is bordered by Glacier Bay Wilderness within Glacier Bay National Park on the west.

== See also ==
- List of U.S. Wilderness Areas
- Wilderness Act
