= Out the road =

Region of Juneau, Alaska, United States

Coordinates: 58.6001°N 134.8757°W

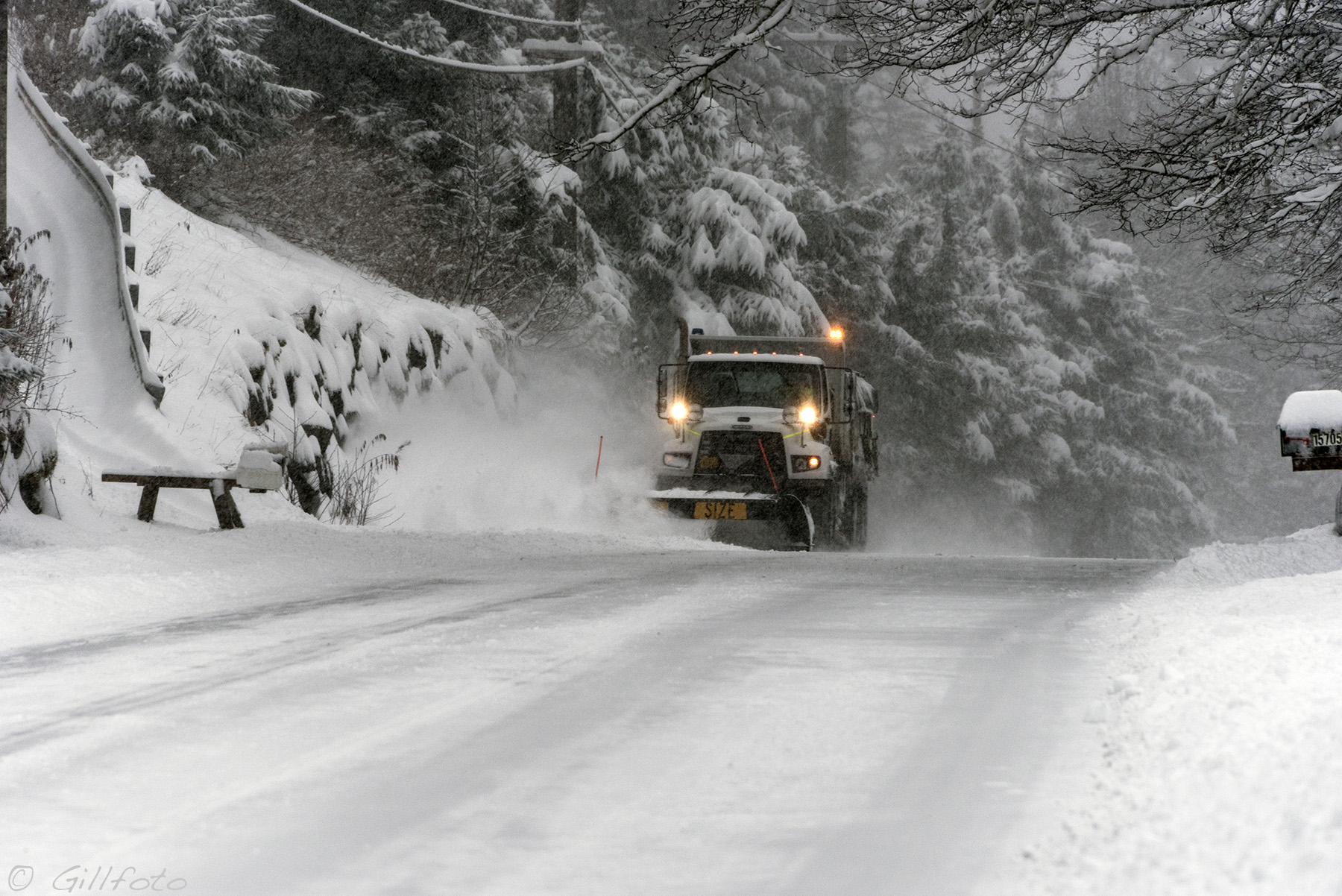
Wintertime view of the Glacier/ Veterans Memorial Highway (the road in "out the road") near Lena Point.

Out the road is a colloquial term for a region of the City and Borough of Juneau, capital of the U.S. state of Alaska, extending from Auke Bay north to a point roughly 45 miles (72 km) from downtown Juneau to where "The Road" dead ends at Echo Cove, a natural harbor with a boat ramp, parking lot, and several camping areas. Juneau is accessible only by boat or plane. Out the road is by far the largest percentage of land area of Juneau, but very sparsely populated; in spring 1998, the Juneau Economic Development Council put its population at 1,348.

Residents of this region get much less rain than the rest of Juneau, with more sunny days. However, it still rains more than half the year. Houses in the area are usually expensive, many selling in the $500,000 to $1,000,000 range. For most of its length, there are no city utility services such as water and sewer lines or connections to the Alaska Electric Light & Power grid, requiring generators, septic tanks, and alternative water sources.

"The Road" is referred to as such simply because it is the only road extending north of Auke Bay. There are two official names recorded: Old Glacier Highway is the name of the root road, and at one point was the name for the entire length. The state government then dubbed the section from Auke Bay to Echo Cove the Veterans Memorial Highway. This name is used by the State, while the City and Borough has retained the name Old Glacier Highway, and continues to publish materials using that name.

In 2005, construction started on a seven-mile extension to the road, the first phase of a proposal to increase access to Kensington mine, which lies approximately 13 miles north of the 'End of the Road'. It was slated to become operational in late 2007. The extension opened in 2013.

Plans in the past have called for the Lynn Canal Highway to continue north from the end of the road to Cascade Point.
