= Medfra, Alaska =

Unincorporated community in the state of Alaska, United States

Medfra
- Unincorporated community village
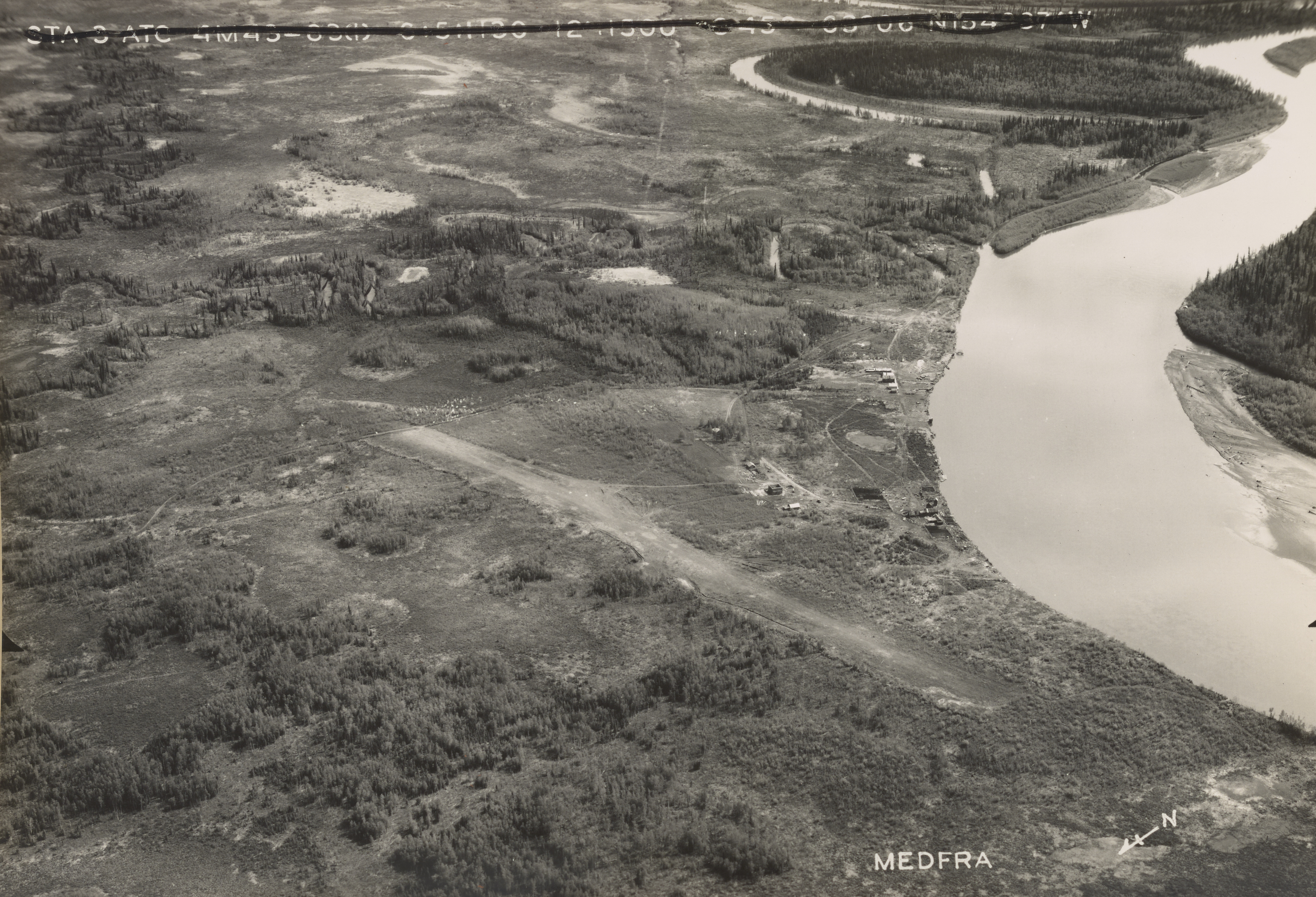
- Medfra, 1944

- Location within the state of Alaska
- Coordinates: 63°06′24″N 154°42′51″W
- Country: United States
- State: Alaska
- Census area: Yukon-Koyukuk

Government
  - State senator: Lyman Hoffman (D)
  - State rep.: Bryce Edgmon (D)

Population (2000)
  - Total: 0
- Time zone: UTC-9 (Alaska (AKST))
  - Summer (DST): UTC-8 (AKDT)

Medfra is an unincorporated community located in the Yukon-Koyukuk Census Area in the U.S. state of Alaska. It has no permanent residential population at present.

== Geography ==
Medfra is located on the north bank of the Kuskokwim River, about 50 km (31 mi) by air northwest of Nikolai.

== History ==
Medfra may have been a small seasonal camp for Alaska Natives before the arrival of Europeans in Alaska. Early in the 20th century, a trading post and boat landing called "Berrys Landing" were established at Medfra. A post office was open from 1922 to 1955.

== Demographics ==
Historical population
Census	Pop.	Note	%±
1930	24		—
1950	25		—
1990	0		—
U.S. Decennial Census

Medfra first reported on the 1930 U.S. Census as an unincorporated village. It did not appear again until 1950. It last appeared on the 1990 census, when it was designated an Alaskan Native Village Statistical Area (ANVSA), but it was uninhabited. It has not appeared on the census since.
