= Dalton Trail =

Coordinates: 59.364167°N 135.87°W

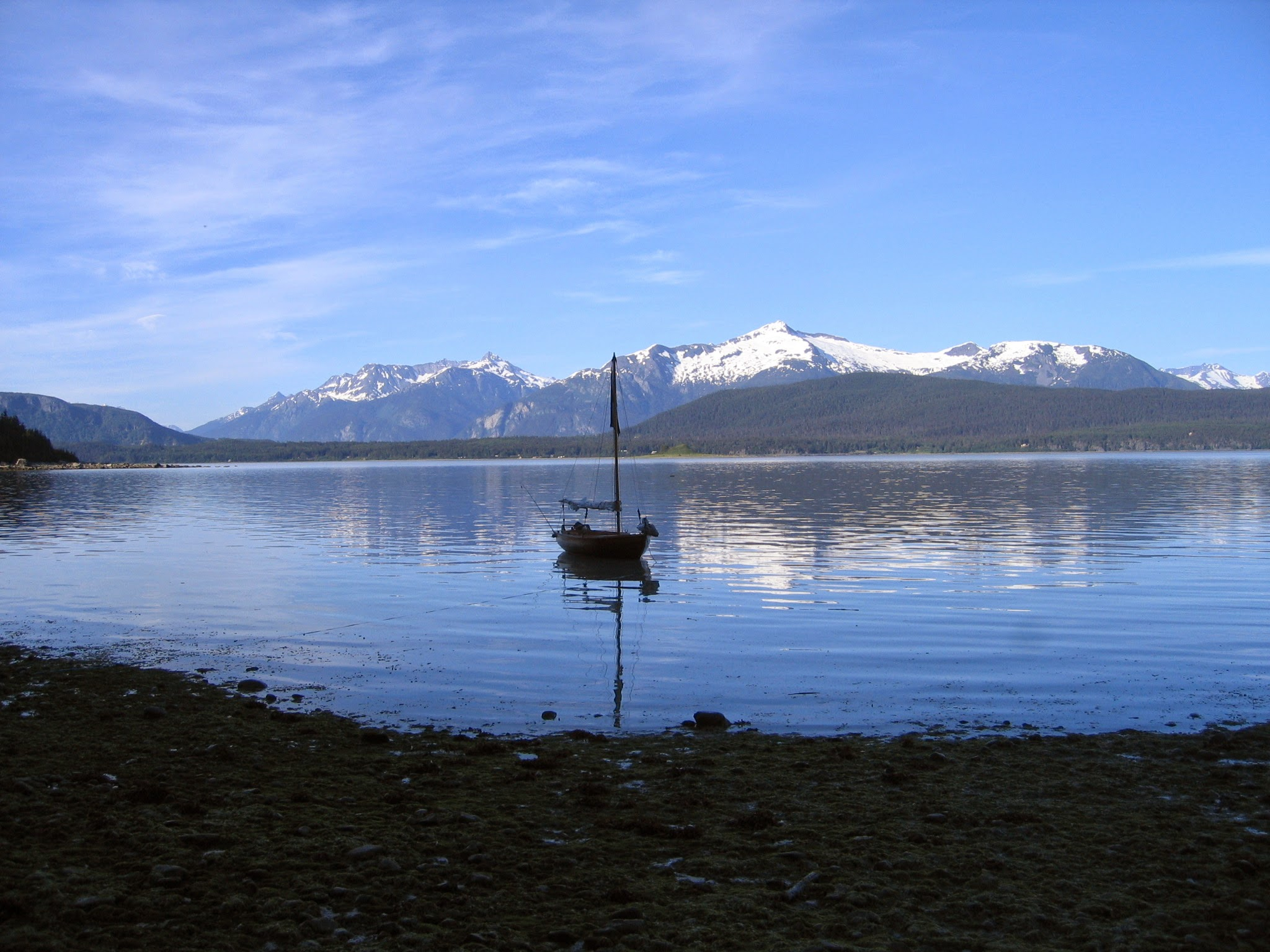
Pyramid Harbor, at the head of the Dalton Trail

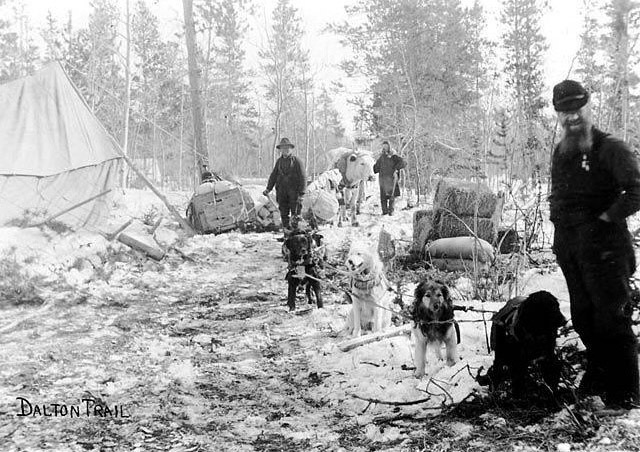
Dogsled team and cow hauling supplies near tent encampment on the Dalton Trail, ca. 1900

The Dalton Trail is a trail that runs between Pyramid Harbor, west of Haines, Alaska in the United States, and Fort Selkirk, in the Yukon Territory of Canada, using the Chilkat Pass. It is 396 km (246 mi) long.

Originally, the Chilkat group of Tlingit controlled the trail, which they used for trade with the Athabascan people of the interior. They called the trail "grease trail" after the eulachon oil (extracted from the tiny candlefish) that was the most important item of trade on the Chilkoot side. Each Tlingit chief had an exclusive Athabascan trading partner. Tlingits took eulachon oil and returned with furs, hides and copper nuggets gathered by the Athabascans. Trading parties often lasted a month or more and often consisted of as many as 100 men, each of whom would carry a 45 kg (100 pound) load.

Upon the arrival of Europeans, the Chilkat acted as middlemen between the traders and Athabascans and became quite wealthy.

The Chilkat trade monopoly was broken in 1890 when E. J. Glave, John (Jack) Dalton and several others were hired by Leslie's Illustrated Magazine of New York to explore the interior of Alaska. While exploring the Grease Trail, they saw the possibility of a trade route there. Dalton and Glave returned in the spring of 1891 to try taking pack horses on the trail. Glave died a few years later, but Dalton remained in the area. He developed a series of trading posts and, in 1899, began charging a toll to use the Grease Trail, which prospectors called Dalton's Trail and later the Dalton Trail. During the Klondike Gold Rush many prospectors walked the trail to Fort Selkirk, where log rafts would float men, horses and cattle to Dawson City.

In 1900, the White Pass and Yukon Route Railway was completed to neighboring Skagway. This ended much of the traffic on the Dalton Trail. The west portion of the present-day Haines Highway follows much the same route as the Dalton Trail.

The Dalton Trail was named after John "Jack" Dalton (June 25, 1856 in Bruce County/Ontario – December 16, 1944 in San Francisco), the father of James W. Dalton, the famous prospector of Alaska's North Slope.
