= Haines Highway =

Highway in Alaska and Yukon Territory

Haines Highway
- Alaska Route 7 Yukon Highway 3
- Haines Highway highlighted in red

Route information
- Maintained by Alaska DOT&PF, Yukon DOH&PW
- Length: 147.9 mi (238.0 km) AK-7: 39.7 mi (63.9 km); YT-3: 174.1 km (108.2 mi)

Major junctions
- South end: Alaska Marine Highway in Haines
- North end: Hwy 1 in Haines Junction, YT

Location
- Countries: Canada, United States
- Provinces: British Columbia
- States: Alaska
- Territories: Yukon

Highway system
- Alaska Routes; Interstate; Scenic Byways
- Territorial highways in Yukon; Miscellaneous
- British Columbia provincial highways
← AK-6	AK	→ AK-8
← Hwy 2	YT	→ Hwy 4

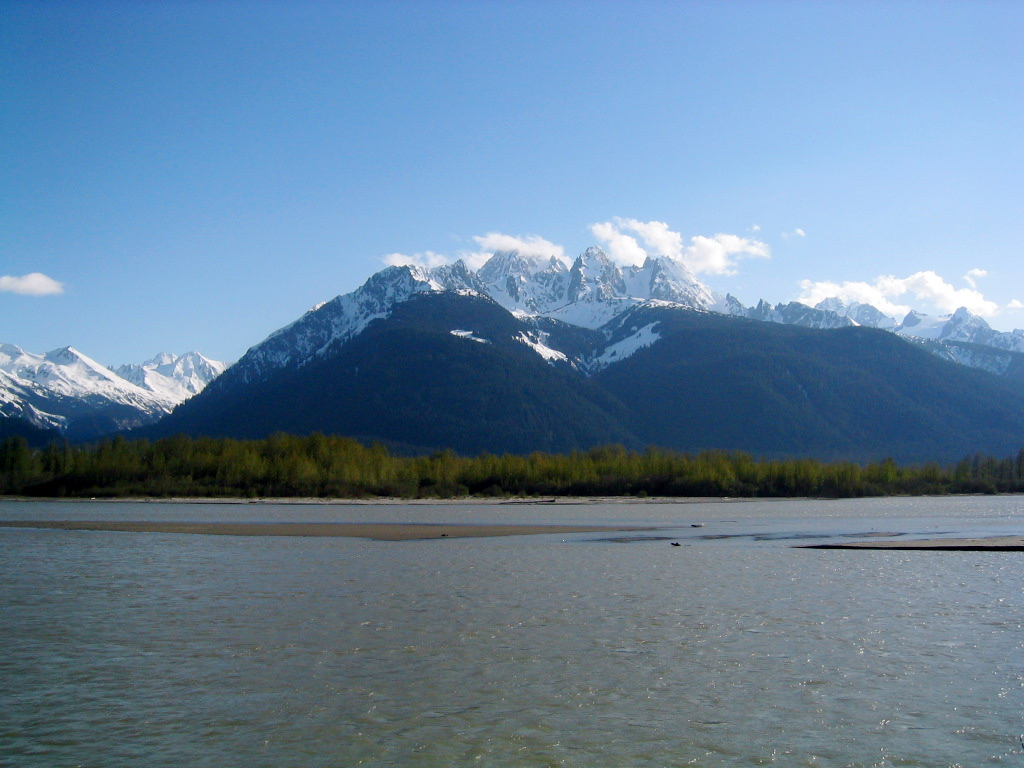
Mile 8 - Mt. Emmerich and the Chilkat River

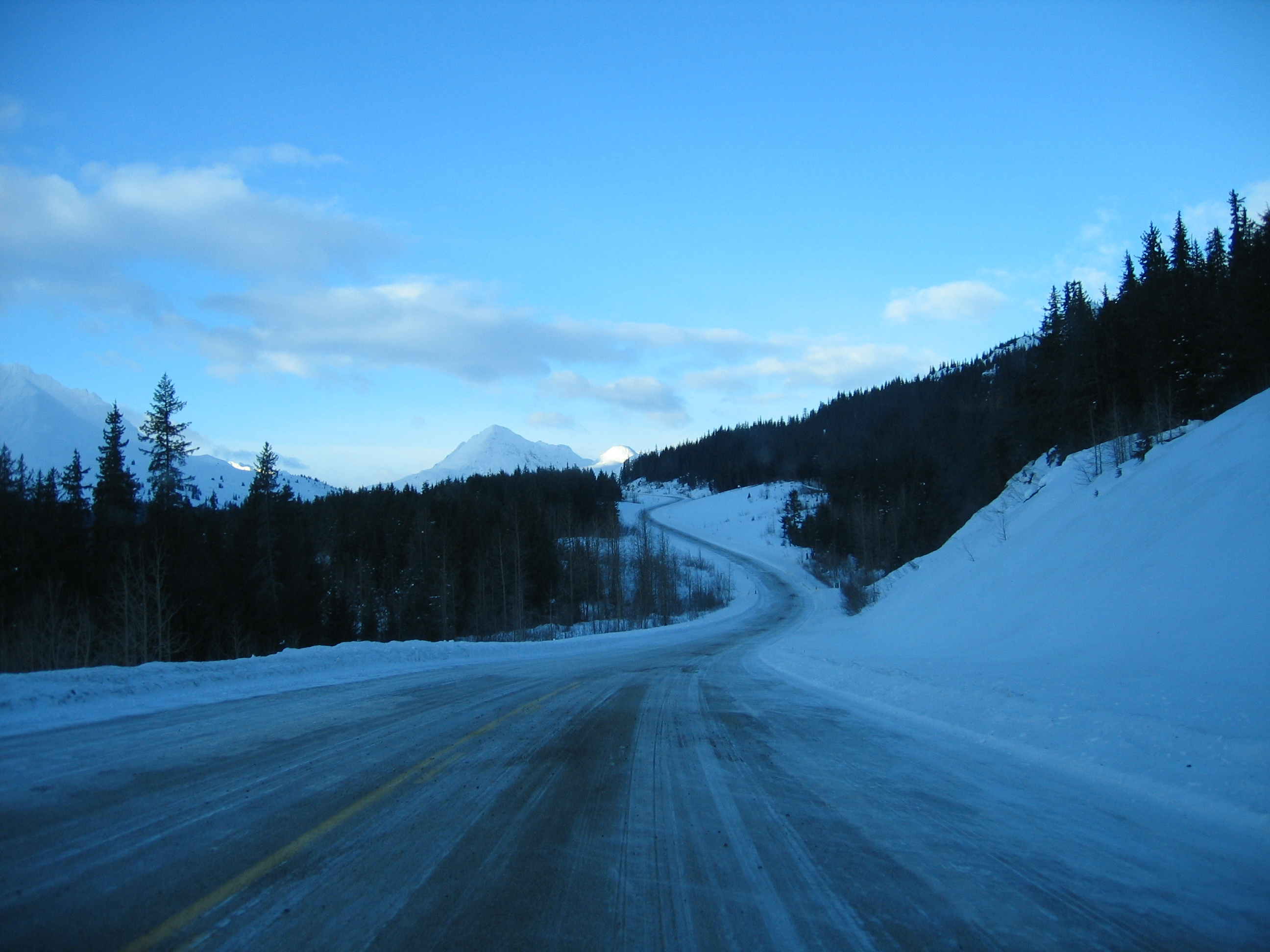
Mile 46 in British Columbia

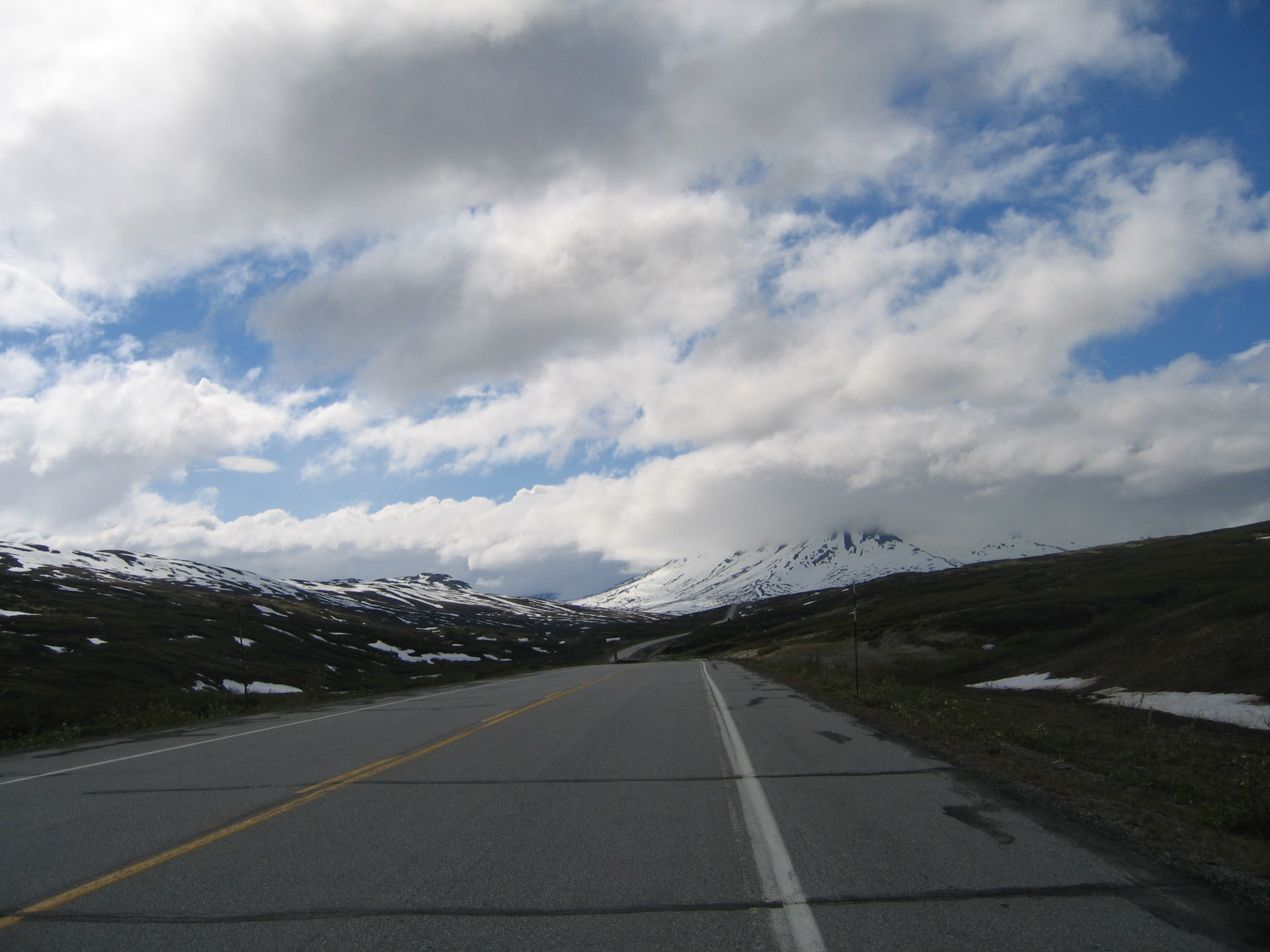
The Chilkat Pass

The Haines Highway or Haines Cut-Off (and still often called Haines Road) is a highway that connects Haines, Alaska, in the United States, with Haines Junction, Yukon, Canada, passing through the province of British Columbia. It follows the route of the old Dalton Trail from the port of Haines inland for about 180 kilometres (110 miles) to Klukshu, Yukon, and then continues to Haines Junction. The highway is about 244 km (152 mi) long, of which 45 miles (72 km) is in Alaska.

The highway was known as "Yukon Highway 4" until 1978, when it was renumbered "Highway 3". It has no number in British Columbia, but editions of The Milepost up to at least 2004 list it as Highway 4, a number actually in use on Vancouver Island. The Alaska section is part of Alaska Route 7.

== History ==
The route was originally a trail used by Chilkat Tlingit traders, which eventually became the Dalton Trail. It was used by some prospectors during the Klondike Gold Rush of 1898-1899; other mining kept the lower Dalton Trail active through the years following its establishment. The British Columbia provincial government converted its portion of the trail to a wagon road in 1909 when copper mining began at Copper Butte and Mt. Glave. In 1911, 30 tons of ore were shipped from the mines.

The highway was built by the U.S. Army in 1943 as an alternate route from the Pacific Ocean to the Alaska Highway, in case the White Pass and Yukon Route railway from Skagway should be blocked. The total cost of the construction was US$13 million.

In the first decades after the war, maintenance was spotty at best; the road was plagued with blizzards in winter and mudslides in summer, and for a time in the 1960s and 1970s, all vehicles traveling the highway were monitored on radio. Year-round access was not achieved until 1963.

Complaints over the condition of the road, primarily in Alaska, led to the U.S. Congress-funded Shakwak reconstruction project. This project, covering the Haines Highway and the portion of the Alaska Highway from Haines Junction to the U.S. border, began in 1976 and was mostly complete by the 1980s, but is still continuing, providing grade improvements, rerouting of dangerous sections, and paving. Responsibility for maintenance is currently shared between the Alaska and Yukon governments.

== Major intersections ==
State / Province / Territory	Region / Municipality	Location	km	mi	Destinations	Notes
Alaska	Haines	Haines	0.0	0.0	Front Street – Haines Ferry Terminal	Alaska Marine Highway
Dalton Cache–Pleasant Camp Border Crossing			63.9	39.7	Canada–United States border Northern terminus of AK-7; southern terminus of Hwy 3	
British Columbia	Stikine Region		94.2	58.5		
			137.9	85.7	British Columbia–Yukon border	
Yukon	Unorganized	Haines Junction	238.0	147.9	Hwy 1 (Alaska Highway) / – Anchorage, Fairbanks, Whitehorse	Hwy 3 northern terminus
1.000 mi = 1.609 km; 1.000 km = 0.621 mi: Route transition

== See also ==
- Dalton Trail
- Glacier Camp
- List of Alaska Routes
- List of Yukon territorial highways
