= Kelsall River =

Coordinates: 59°31′53″N 136°02′00″W

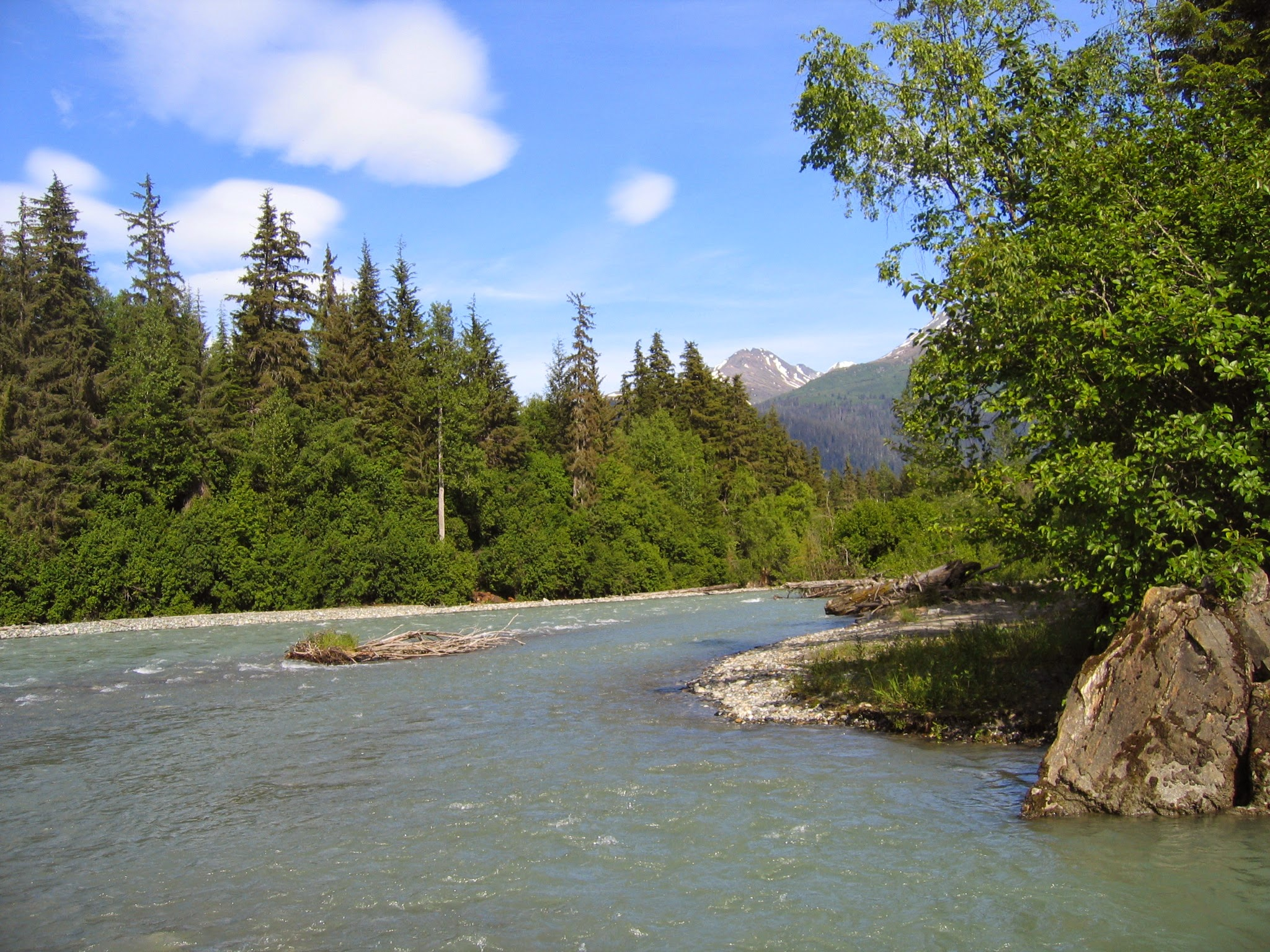
The Kelsall River near its confluence with the Chilkat in Southeast Alaska

The Kelsall River is a river in the U.S. State of Alaska and the Canadian province of British Columbia. It is a tributary of the Chilkat River, flowing into it in the Haines Borough of Alaska.

== See also ==
- List of rivers of Alaska
- List of rivers of British Columbia
- List of rivers of Yukon
