= Haines Junction =

- Village
- Village of Haines Junction
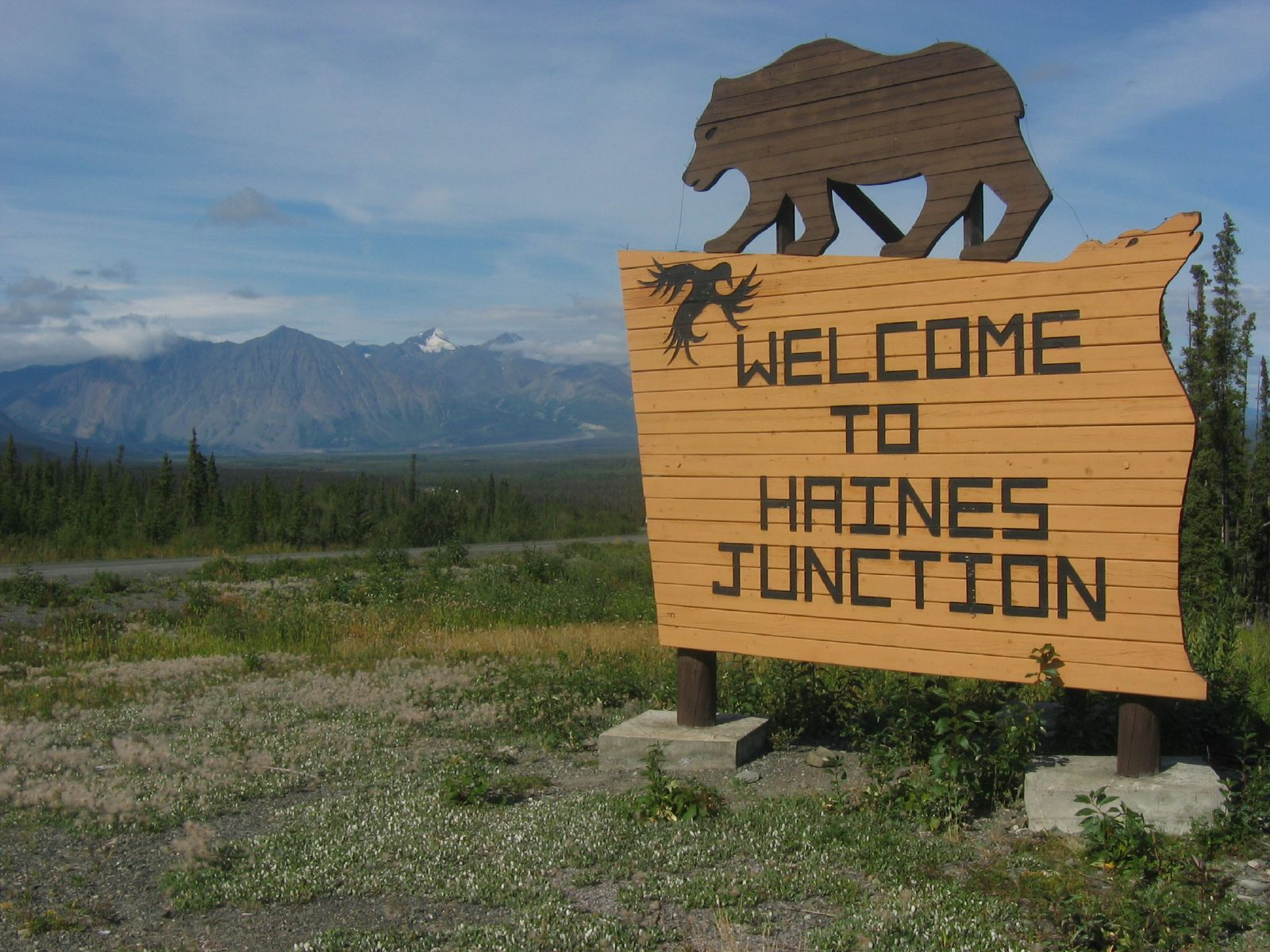

- Location within Yukon Location within Canada
- Coordinates: 60°45′13″N 137°30′39″W
- Country: Canada
- Territory: Yukon
- Founded: 1942
- Incorporated: 1984

Government
  - Village Mayor: Michael Riseborough
  - Governing body: Village of Haines Junction Council

Area (2021)
  - Land: 34.3 km^{2} (13.2 sq mi)

Population (2021)
  - Total: 688
  - Density: 20.1/km^{2} (52/sq mi)
  - Change 2016-2021: ▲11.2%
- Time zone: UTC−07:00 (MST)
- Postal code: Y0B 1L0
- Area code: +1-867
- Climate: Dfc / Dsc
- Website: Official website

Haines Junction is a village in Yukon, Canada. It is at Kilometre 1,632 (historical mile 1016) of the Alaska Highway at its junction with the Haines Highway, hence the name of the community. According to the 2021 census, the population was 688. However, the Yukon Bureau of Statistics lists the population count for 2022 as 1,018.

Haines Junction lies east of Kluane National Park and Reserve. It is a major administrative centre for the Champagne and Aishihik First Nations.

== History ==
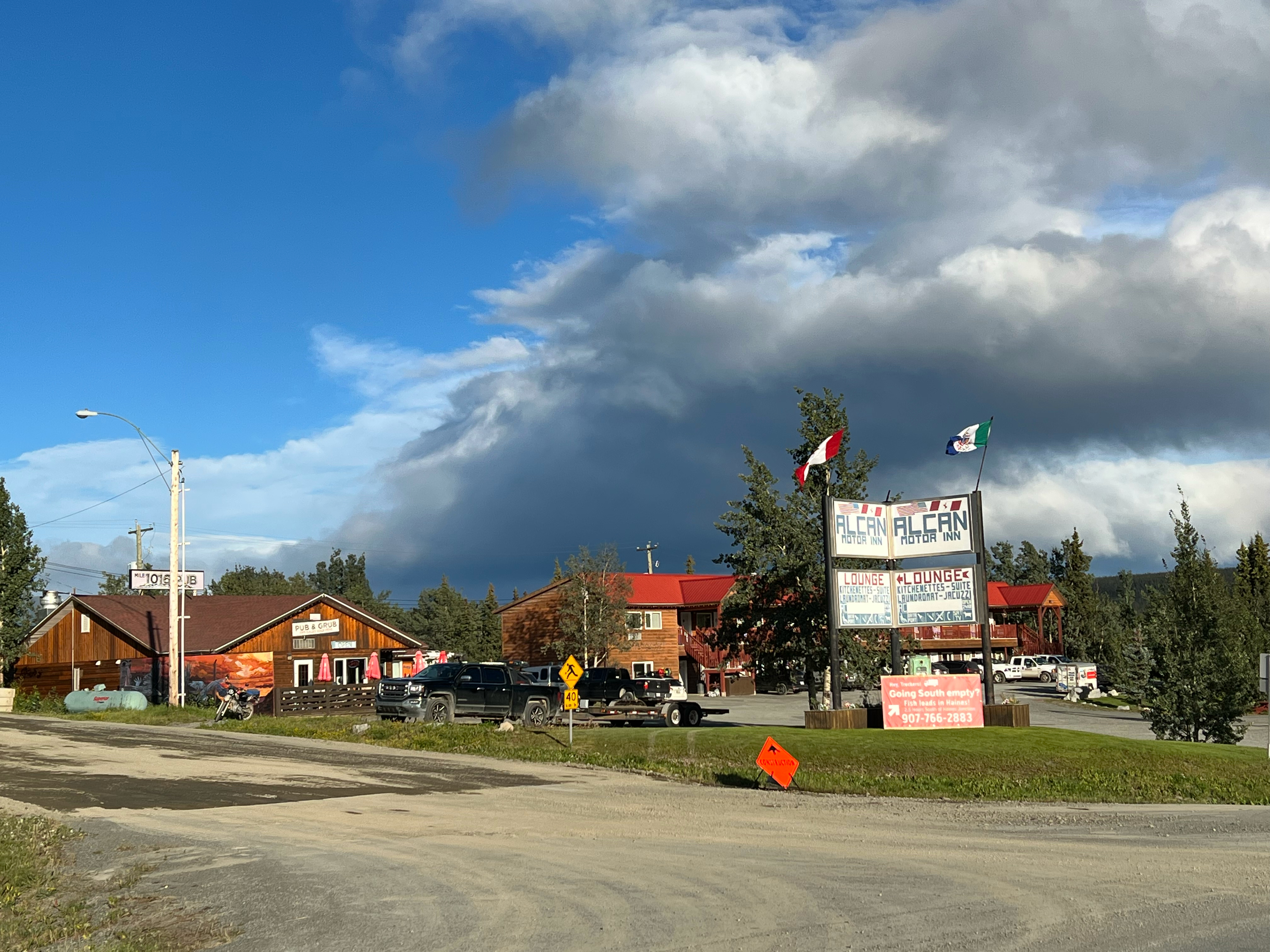
Haines Junction in summer, 2022

For around two thousand years, the Southern Tutchone people had seasonal hunting and fishing camps in the area of present-day Haines Junction. The original name of the area was "Dakwakada", a Southern Tutchone word meaning "high cache". It was common for Tutchone people to use raised log caches to store food year-round or temporarily while they hunted and fished in an area.

The Haines Junction area was also important for trade between the coastal and interior peoples. It lies at the interior end of the Chilkat Pass, one of only three passes that allowed travel between the coast and the interior, which was used extensively for trade between the coastal Tlingit and Southern Tutchone people.

The current town of Haines Junction was established in 1942 and 1943 during the construction of the Alaska Highway (ALCAN). In 1943, a second highway, the Haines Highway, was built to connect the Alaska Highway with the coastal town of Haines, Alaska, over the Chilkat Pass. Situated at the junction of these two highways, Haines Junction was a construction camp and a supply and service centre for the United States Army Corps of Engineers building the highway. The 1,007 km (626 mi) Haines-Fairbanks Pipeline, a petroleum pipeline from Haines, Alaska to Fairbanks, Alaska that was constructed in 1953–55, with a pumping station was built just north of Haines Junction.

== Geography ==
=== Climate ===
Haines Junction has a subarctic climate (Dfc / Dsc) with mild summers and long, cold and snowy winters, with annual snowfall averaging 159.8 cm (62.9 in).

Climate data for Haines Junction WMO ID: 71505; coordinates 60°46′21″N 137°34′49″W; elevation: 595.3 m (1,953 ft); 1991–2020 normals
Month	Jan	Feb	Mar	Apr	May	Jun	Jul	Aug	Sep	Oct	Nov	Dec	Year
Record high humidex	12.5	13.4	16.4	20.4	28.2	31.8	30.9	32.2	24.2	23.0	13.1	16.3	32.2
Record high °C (°F)	13.6 (56.5)	13.6 (56.5)	16.9 (62.4)	20.7 (69.3)	28.6 (83.5)	32.1 (89.8)	30.5 (86.9)	31.0 (87.8)	24.2 (75.6)	23.8 (74.8)	14.5 (58.1)	16.9 (62.4)	32.1 (89.8)
Mean daily maximum °C (°F)	−12.5 (9.5)	−5.5 (22.1)	0.0 (32.0)	7.8 (46.0)	14.3 (57.7)	18.8 (65.8)	20.3 (68.5)	18.6 (65.5)	13.5 (56.3)	5.2 (41.4)	−6.8 (19.8)	−10.8 (12.6)	5.2 (41.4)
Daily mean °C (°F)	−17.3 (0.9)	−12.8 (9.0)	−7.8 (18.0)	0.9 (33.6)	7.1 (44.8)	11.5 (52.7)	13.3 (55.9)	11.5 (52.7)	6.8 (44.2)	−0.4 (31.3)	−12.0 (10.4)	−16.1 (3.0)	−1.3 (29.7)
Mean daily minimum °C (°F)	−22.6 (−8.7)	−20.0 (−4.0)	−15.6 (3.9)	−5.9 (21.4)	−0.2 (31.6)	4.1 (39.4)	6.3 (43.3)	4.4 (39.9)	0.0 (32.0)	−6.0 (21.2)	−17.2 (1.0)	−21.3 (−6.3)	−7.8 (18.0)
Record low °C (°F)	−48.5 (−55.3)	−45.6 (−50.1)	−41.8 (−43.2)	−31.3 (−24.3)	−8.1 (17.4)	−3.7 (25.3)	−1.7 (28.9)	−4.0 (24.8)	−13.0 (8.6)	−29.1 (−20.4)	−44.1 (−47.4)	−47.3 (−53.1)	−48.5 (−55.3)
Record low wind chill	−57.0	−50.1	−46.5	−34.4	−10.1	−5.1	−3.5	−5.0	−13.1	−28.3	−50.1	−50.3	−57.0
Average precipitation mm (inches)	32.3 (1.27)	18.6 (0.73)	9.2 (0.36)	9.0 (0.35)	15.7 (0.62)	28.3 (1.11)	35.2 (1.39)	28.5 (1.12)	34.1 (1.34)	35.4 (1.39)	30.5 (1.20)	29.0 (1.14)	305.7 (12.04)
Average rainfall mm (inches)	1.1 (0.04)	0.6 (0.02)	0.3 (0.01)	0.8 (0.03)	11.8 (0.46)	28.3 (1.11)	35.2 (1.39)	28.3 (1.11)	33.7 (1.33)	13.3 (0.52)	0.8 (0.03)	0.1 (0.00)	154.3 (6.07)
Average snowfall cm (inches)	32.7 (12.9)	19.4 (7.6)	9.9 (3.9)	8.8 (3.5)	4.0 (1.6)	0.0 (0.0)	0.0 (0.0)	0.1 (0.0)	0.4 (0.2)	23.2 (9.1)	31.3 (12.3)	29.8 (11.7)	159.8 (62.9)
Average precipitation days (≥ 0.2 mm)	10.0	8.0	5.0	4.0	5.0	8.0	9.0	9.0	9.0	10.0	9.0	11.0	96.0
Average rainy days (≥ 0.2 mm)	—	—	—	—	4.0	8.0	9.0	9.0	9.0	4.0	—	—	43.0
Average snowy days (≥ 0.2 cm)	10.0	8.0	5.0	4.0	2.0	0.0	0.0	—	—	7.0	9.0	11.0	54.0
Average relative humidity (%) (at 1500 LST)	71.0	57.6	42.9	38.0	34.6	39.2	44.2	46.6	49.6	60.9	75.6	77.2	53.1
Source: Environment and Climate Change Canada; Precipitation, rain, snow, precipitation days, rain days, and snow days from 1961-1990 station data

== Demographics ==
Federal census population history of Haines Junction
Year	Pop.	±%
1971	183	—
1976	268	+46.4%
1981	366	+36.6%
1986	340	−7.1%
1991	477	+40.3%
1996	574	+20.3%
2001	531	−7.5%
2006	589	+10.9%
2011	593	+0.7%
2016	613	+3.4%
2021	688	+12.2%
Source: Statistics Canada

In the 2021 Canadian census conducted by Statistics Canada, Haines Junction had a population of 688 living in 311 of its 380 total private dwellings, a change of 12.2% from its 2016 population of 613. With a land area of 34.3 km^{2} (13.2 sq mi), it had a population density of 20.1/km^{2} (52.0/sq mi) in 2021.

Panethnic groups in the Village of Haines Junction (2001−2021)
Panethnic group	2021		2016		2011		2006		2001	
Panethnic group	Pop.	%	Pop.	%	Pop.	%	Pop.	%	Pop.	%
European (Note: Statistic includes all persons that did not make up part of a visible minority or an indigenous identity.)	370	54.01%	335	55.37%	330	53.23%	320	54.7%	305	57.55%
Indigenous	290	42.34%	255	42.15%	270	43.55%	245	41.88%	215	40.57%
Southeast Asian (Note: Statistic includes total responses of "Filipino" and "Southeast Asian" under visible minority section on census.)	15	2.19%	0	0%	0	0%	10	1.71%	0	0%
East Asian (Note: Statistic includes total responses of "Chinese", "Korean", and "Japanese" under visible minority section on census.)	0	0%	10	1.65%	10	1.61%	20	3.42%	10	1.89%
South Asian	0	0%	10	1.65%	0	0%	0	0%	0	0%
Latin American	0	0%	0	0%	0	0%	0	0%	10	1.89%
Middle Eastern (Note: Statistic includes total responses of "West Asian" and "Arab" under visible minority section on census.)	0	0%	0	0%	0	0%	0	0%	0	0%
African	0	0%	0	0%	0	0%	0	0%	0	0%
Other/multiracial (Note: Statistic includes total responses of "Visible minority, n.i.e." and "Multiple visible minorities" under visible minority section on census.)	0	0%	0	0%	0	0%	0	0%	0	0%
Total responses	685	99.56%	605	98.69%	620	104.55%	585	99.32%	530	99.81%
Total population	688	100%	613	100%	593	100%	589	100%	531	100%
Note: Totals greater than 100% due to multiple origin responses

== Infrastructure ==
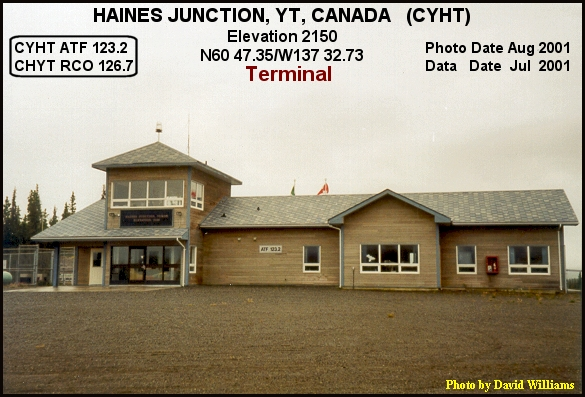
Haines Junction Airport

By road, Haines Junction is served by the Alaska Highway and the Haines Highway (Yukon Highway 3). By air, it is served by the Haines Junction Airport.

Fibre connections to most homes and businesses are becoming available in late 2022 / early 2023. Bell Mobility operates a cellular network tower in the area.

== See also ==
- List of municipalities in Yukon
