= Haines Borough, Alaska =

Borough in Alaska, United States

- Borough
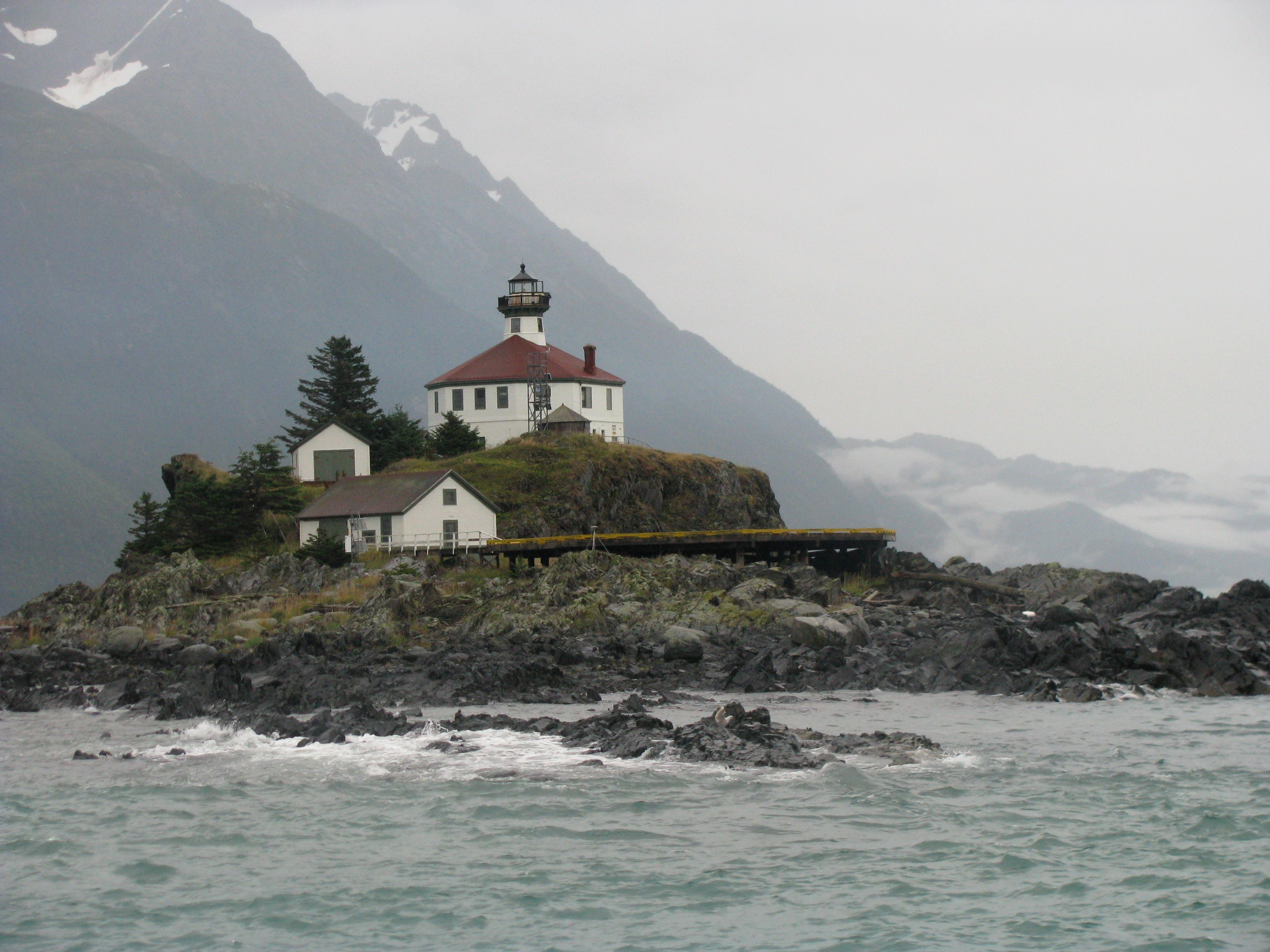
- Lighthouse on Eldred Rock island.

- Location within the U.S. state of Alaska
- Coordinates: 59°10′N 135°26′W
- Country: United States
- State: Alaska
- Founded: August 29, 1968
- Named for: Haines

Area
  - Total: 2,726 sq mi (7,060 km^{2})
  - Land: 2,319 sq mi (6,010 km^{2})
  - Water: 407 sq mi (1,050 km^{2}) 14.9%

Population (2020)
  - Total: 2,080
  - Estimate (2025): 2,068 ▼
  - Density: 0.897/sq mi (0.346/km^{2})
- Time zone: UTC−9 (Alaska)
  - Summer (DST): UTC−8 (ADT)
- Congressional district: At-large
- Website: www.hainesborough.us

Haines Borough is a home-rule borough located in the state of Alaska. As of the 2020 census, the population was 2,080, down from 2,508 in 2010.

== Geography ==
The borough has a total area of 2,726 square miles (7,060 km^{2}), of which 2,319 square miles (6,010 km^{2}) is land and 407 square miles (1,050 km^{2}) (14.9%) is water.

=== Adjacent boroughs and census areas ===
- Municipality of Skagway Borough, Alaska – northeast
- Juneau City and Borough, Alaska – southeast
- Hoonah-Angoon Census Area, Alaska – south, west
- Stikine Region, British Columbia – northwest, east

=== National protected area ===
- Tongass National Forest (part)
  - Endicott River Wilderness

== Demographics ==
Historical population
Census	Pop.	Note	%±
1970	1,504		—
1980	1,680		11.7%
1990	2,117		26.0%
2000	2,392		13.0%
2010	2,508		4.8%
2020	2,080		−17.1%
2025 (est.)	2,068	▼	−0.6%
U.S. Decennial Census; 1900-1990 1990-2000; 2010-2020

=== 2020 census ===
Haines Borough, Alaska – Racial and ethnic composition Note: the US Census treats Hispanic/Latino as an ethnic category. This table excludes Latinos from the racial categories and assigns them to a separate category. Hispanics/Latinos may be of any race.
Race / Ethnicity (NH = Non-Hispanic)	Pop 1980	Pop 1990	Pop 2000	Pop 2010	Pop 2020	% 1980	% 1990	% 2000	% 2010	% 2020
White alone (NH)	1,417	1,793	1,960	2,062	1,577	84.35%	84.70%	81.94%	82.22%	75.82%
Black or African American alone (NH)	3	1	3	9	2	0.18%	0.05%	0.13%	0.36%	0.10%
Native American or Alaska Native alone (NH)	214	279	271	227	205	12.74%	13.18%	11.33%	9.05%	9.86%
Asian alone (NH)	5	17	17	13	14	0.30%	0.80%	0.71%	0.52%	0.67%
Native Hawaiian or Pacific Islander alone (NH)	x	x	2	0	2	x	x	0.08%	0.00%	0.10%
Other race alone (NH)	28	0	6	13	9	1.67%	0.00%	0.25%	0.52%	0.43%
Mixed race or Multiracial (NH)	x	x	100	137	204	x	x	4.18%	5.46%	9.81%
Hispanic or Latino (any race)	13	27	33	47	67	0.77%	1.28%	1.38%	1.87%	3.22%
Total	1,680	2,117	2,392	2,508	2,080	100.00%	100.00%	100.00%	100.00%	100.00%

As of the 2020 census, the county had a population of 2,080. The median age was 48.6 years. 18.2% of residents were under the age of 18 and 23.7% of residents were 65 years of age or older. For every 100 females there were 102.3 males, and for every 100 females age 18 and over there were 102.4 males age 18 and over.

The racial makeup of the county was 76.4% White, 0.1% Black or African American, 10.3% American Indian and Alaska Native, 0.7% Asian, 0.1% Native Hawaiian and Pacific Islander, 0.8% from some other race, and 11.6% from two or more races. Hispanic or Latino residents of any race comprised 3.2% of the population.

0.0% of residents lived in urban areas, while 100.0% lived in rural areas.

There were 966 households in the county, of which 25.7% had children under the age of 18 living with them and 22.5% had a female householder with no spouse or partner present. About 33.4% of all households were made up of individuals and 14.8% had someone living alone who was 65 years of age or older.

There were 1,370 housing units, of which 29.5% were vacant. Among occupied housing units, 72.3% were owner-occupied and 27.7% were renter-occupied. The homeowner vacancy rate was 1.8% and the rental vacancy rate was 12.3%.

=== 2000 census ===
At the 2000 census there were 2,392 people, 991 households, and 654 families living in the borough. The population density was 0.88 people per square mile (0.34 people/km^{2}). There were 1,419 housing units at an average density of 0.52 per square mile (0.20/km^{2}). The racial makeup of the borough was 82.53% White, 0.13% Black or African American, 11.50% Native American, 0.71% Asian, 0.08% Pacific Islander, 0.42% from other races, and 4.64% from two or more races. 1.38% of the population were Hispanic or Latino of any race. Of the 991 households 31.60% had children under the age of 18 living with them, 54.00% were married couples living together, 7.30% had a female householder with no husband present, and 34.00% were non-families. 27.10% of households were one person and 7.20% were one person aged 65 or older. The average household size was 2.41 and the average family size was 2.94.

The age distribution was 25.60% under the age of 18, 5.30% from 18 to 24, 28.20% from 25 to 44, 30.40% from 45 to 64, and 10.50% 65 or older. The median age was 41 years. For every 100 females, there were 102.50 males. For every 100 females age 18 and over, there were 103.10 males.

== Transportation ==
Haines is one of the northern stops on the Alaska Marine Highway. Many people who travel in winter travel to Haines by ferry to avoid travelling the "Alcan", or Alaska Highway. Haines is also accessible by air service from neighboring Juneau, Alaska.

== Items of interest ==
Around November of each year, thousands of eagles descend en masse to feast on one of the salmon runs. Many photographers come to attain easily accessible photos of eagles.

== Communities ==
=== Census-designated places ===
- Covenant Life
- Excursion Inlet
- Haines (Borough seat)
- Lutak
- Mosquito Lake
- Mud Bay

== Politics ==
In five presidential elections since 1960 has the Democratic candidate carried Haines Borough: 1964, 1992, 2016, 2020, and 2024. Joe Biden in 2020 carried the borough by the largest margin since 1964.

United States presidential election results for Haines Borough, Alaska
Year	Republican		Democratic		Third party(ies)	
Year	No.	%	No.	%	No.	%
1960	152	55.27%	123	44.73%	0	0.00%
1964	74	23.20%	245	76.80%	0	0.00%
1968	231	50.00%	155	33.55%	76	16.45%
1972	335	69.79%	122	25.42%	23	4.79%
1976	337	61.16%	182	33.03%	32	5.81%
1980	475	66.43%	142	19.86%	98	13.71%
1984	672	63.58%	302	28.57%	83	7.85%
1988	512	56.26%	359	39.45%	39	4.29%
1992	463	33.38%	522	37.64%	402	28.98%
1996	684	45.57%	507	33.78%	310	20.65%
2000	741	55.26%	339	25.28%	261	19.46%
2004	561	54.68%	420	40.94%	45	4.39%
2008	785	51.24%	696	45.43%	51	3.33%
2012	625	47.71%	595	45.42%	90	6.87%
2016	611	41.76%	634	43.34%	218	14.90%
2020	700	40.82%	968	56.44%	47	2.74%
2024	791	44.09%	908	50.61%	95	5.30%

== See also ==
- List of airports in the Haines Borough
- National Register of Historic Places listings in Haines Borough, Alaska
- Gold Rush: White Water
