= Ferry =

Ship to carry people and goods on water

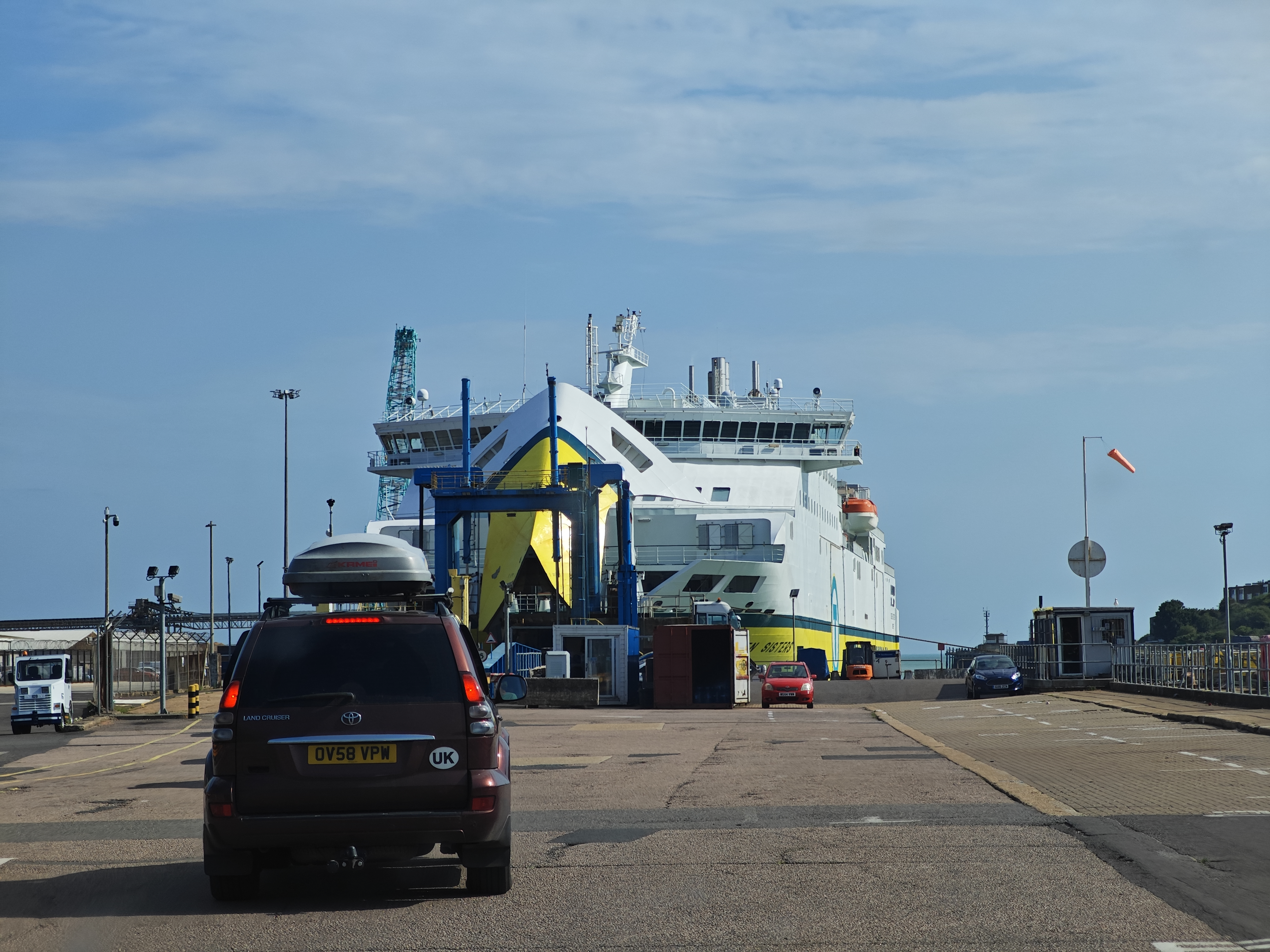
Passenger and vehicle ferry in coastal waters

A ferry is a boat or ship that transports passengers, and occasionally vehicles and cargo, across a body of water. A small passenger ferry with multiple stops, like those in Venice, Italy, is sometimes referred to as a water taxi or water bus.

Ferries form a part of the public transport systems of many waterside cities and islands, allowing direct transit between points at a capital cost much lower than bridges or tunnels. Ship connections of much larger distances (such as over long distances in water bodies like the Baltic Sea) may also be called ferry services, and many carry vehicles.

== History ==
The profession of the ferryman is embodied in Greek mythology in Charon, the boatman who transported souls across the River Styx to the Underworld.

Speculation that a pair of oxen propelled a ship having a water wheel can be found in 4th century Roman literature "Anonymus De Rebus Bellicis". The concept was refined to use horses turning a capstan or a treadmill; this was a precursor to steam to drive paddlewheel boats. These were known as team boats. An example was the Experiment, which was used on Lake Champlain in 19th-century America.

In 1850 the roll-on roll-off (ro-ro) ferry, Leviathan designed to carry freight wagons efficiently across the Firth of Forth in Scotland started to operate between Granton, near Edinburgh, and Burntisland in Fife. The vessel design was highly innovative and the ability to move freight in great quantities and with minimal labour signalled the way ahead for sea-borne transport, converting the ro-ro ferry from an experimental and marginal ship type into one of central importance in the transport of goods and passengers.

In 1871, the world's first car ferry crossed the Bosphorus in Istanbul. The iron steamship, named Suhulet (meaning 'ease' or 'convenience') was designed by the general manager of Şirket-i Hayriye (Bosporus Steam Navigation Company), Giritli Hüseyin Haki Bey and built by the Greenwich shipyard of Maudslay, Sons and Field. It weighed 157 tons, was 155 feet (47 meters) long, 27 feet (8.2 meters) wide and had a draft of 9 feet (2.7 meters). It was capable of travelling up to 6 knots with the side wheel turned by its 450-horsepower, single-cylinder, two-cycle steam engine. Launched in 1872, Suhulet's unique features consisted of a symmetrical entry and exit for horse carriages, along with a dual system of hatchways. The ferry operated on the Üsküdar-Kabataş route, which is still serviced by modern ferries today.

== Notable services ==
=== Asia ===
In Hong Kong, Star Ferry carries passengers across Victoria Harbour. Other carriers ferry travelers between Hong Kong Island and outlying islands like Cheung Chau, Lantau Island and Lamma Island.

In the Philippines, the Philippine Nautical Highway System forms the backbone of the nationwide transport system by integrating ports with highway systems; the system has three main routes. Another known ferry service is the Pasig River Ferry Service, which is the only water-based transportation in Metro Manila. This system cruises the Pasig River.

==== Bangladesh ====
The country's extensive river network makes ferries a practical and affordable mode of transport. Passenger ferries, locally referred to as "launches," are widely used to travel to the southern and south-western regions of Bangladesh from the capital. The most popular destinations include Barisal, Bhola, Patuakhali, and Khulna. Additionally, there are water-transport routes connecting Dhaka with Kolkata in India.

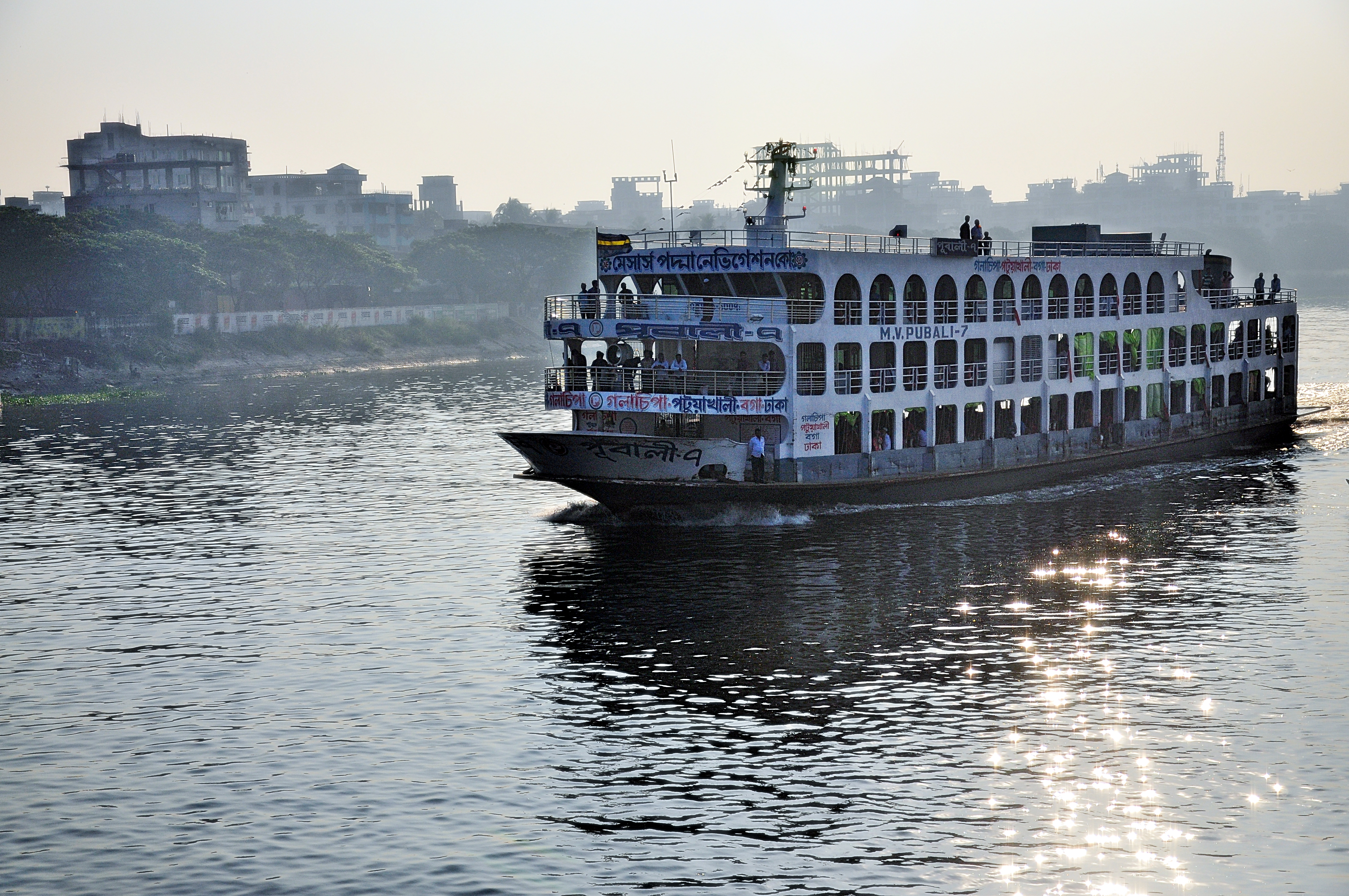
A triple-decker launch (passenger ferry) on a river in Bangladesh

Approximately 200 launches operate across 107 water routes throughout the country as of 2022. To support the launch services, the BIWTA has developed 292 wharfs (ghats) for the docking of these vessels, and oversees 380 launch terminals.

There are 53 roll-on/roll-off ferries running on seven routes across the country: Paturia–Daulatdia, Aricha–Kazirhat, Shimulia–Banglabazar, Bhola–Lakshmipur, Lajarhat–Veduria, Char Kalipur–Kalipur Bazar and Harinaghat Chandpur–Shariatpur.

More than 800,000 small and medium wooden sailboats and rowboats, often retrofitted to be motorised, are an important means of transportation for people and goods across the country, especially during the rainy season. These boats transport over 1.2 million tonnes of freight annually. Among these are the dingi, which is the oldest form of Bengal boat. Larger cargo boats includes vessels such as the balam, bajra and sampan. Under the category of bainkata (flat-bottomed) boats are the ghasi, gachari, dorakha, kathami, mallar, patam and panshi, among others. Ubiquitous throughout Bangladesh, especially in monsoon flood-prone regions, is the kosha, a small, highly manoeuvrable boat that is easy to operate. These various traditional wooden boats play a vital role in providing transportation during the rainy season when other modes become impractical due to flooding.

The ferries are often overloaded and continue to operate in poor weather; many people die each year in ferry and launch accidents. From 2005 to 2015, nearly 1,800 casualties have been reported due to river transport incidents, a number which may be higher due to the prevalence of unregistered vessels. In 2014, the launch Pinak 6 sank in the Padma River with more than 200 passengers aboard near Munshiganj's Louhajang Upazila.

==== India ====
India's ro-ro ferry service between Ghogha and Dahej was inaugurated on 22 October 2017. It connects South Gujarat and Saurashtra, separated by 360 kilometres (220 mi) of roadway, with a 31-kilometre (19 mi) ferry service. It is a part of the larger Sagar Mala project.

Water transport in Mumbai consists of ferries, hovercraft, and catamarans, operated by various government agencies as well as private entities. The Kerala State Water Transport Department (SWTD), operating under the Ministry of Transport, Government of Kerala, India regulates the inland navigation systems in the Indian state of Kerala. It stands for catering to the passenger and cargo traffic needs of the inhabitants of the waterlogged areas of the Districts of Alappuzha, Kottayam, Kollam, Ernakulam, Kannur and Kasargode. SWTD ferry service is also one of the most affordable modes to enjoy the Kerala backwaters.

In the Andaman Islands, ferries operates between Port Blair, Havelock and Neil Islands.

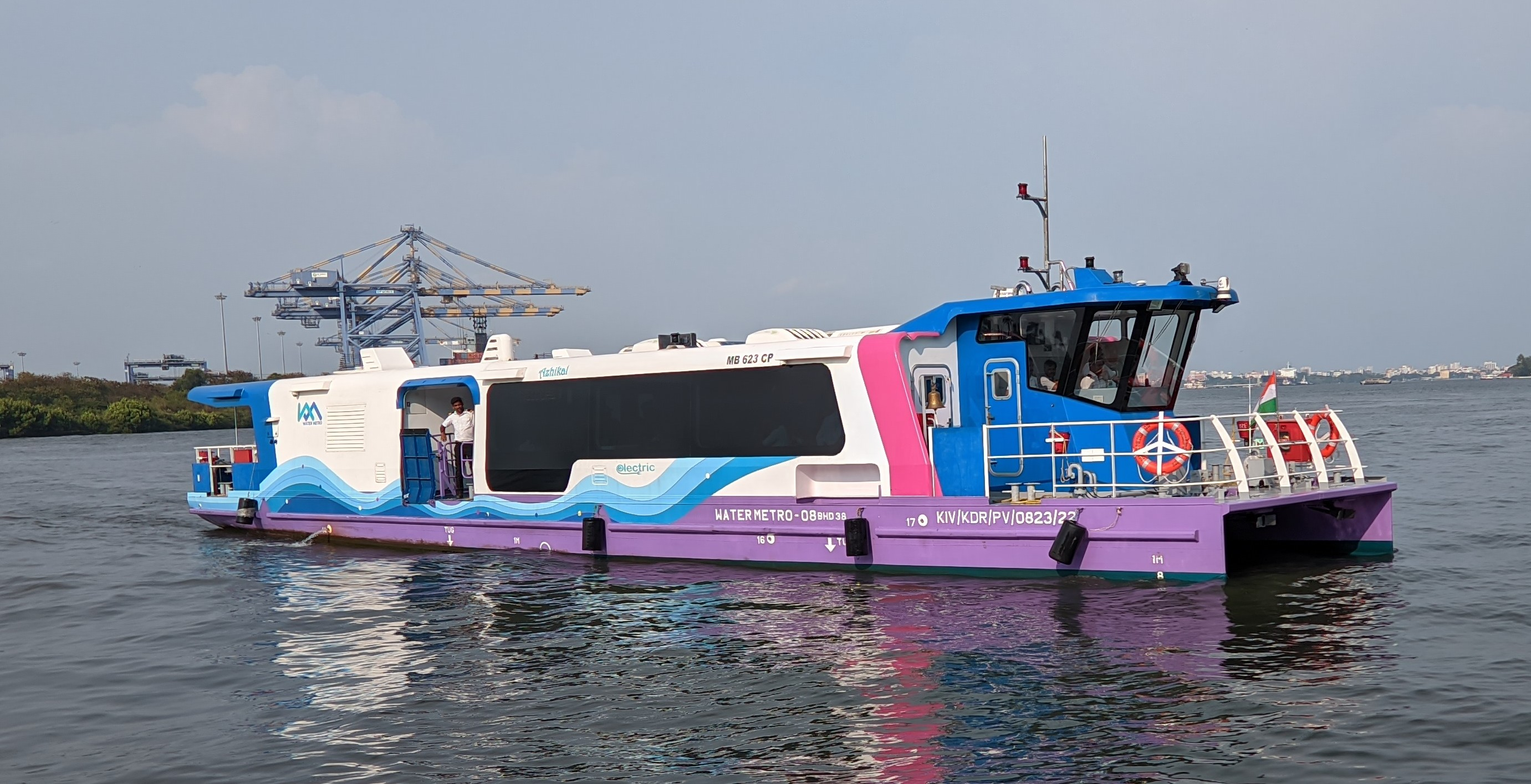
Kochi Water Metro

The Kochi Water Metro is a public water transport system serving the Kochi metropolitan area in the Indian state of Kerala. It operates as an extension of the city's urban transit network and the Kochi Metro, linking the mainland with surrounding islands through a series of scheduled ferry routes. Managed by Kochi Metro Rail Limited, the system employs battery-powered electric boats and includes multiple terminals across the Kochi backwaters. The service was inaugurated in April 2023 and represents one of the first organized water metro projects in India designed for regular commuter use.

==== Indonesia ====
As the largest archipelagic country, Indonesia has several ferry routes which is managed mostly by PT. ASDP Indonesia Ferry (Persero) and several private companies. ASDP Indonesia Ferry or ASDP is a state-owned company engaged in the business of integrated ferry and port services and waterfront tourist destinations. ASDP operates a ferry fleet of more than 160 units handling more than 300 routes in 36 ports throughout Indonesia.

==== Japan ====
Japan used to rely heavily on ferries for passenger and goods transportation among the four main islands of Hokkaido, Honshu, Shikoku and Kyushu. However, as highway and railway bridges and undersea tunnels (such as the Seikan Tunnel and Honshū–Shikoku Bridge Project) have been constructed, the ferry transportation has recently become for short-distance sightseeing passengers with or without car, and for long-distance truck drivers hauling goods.

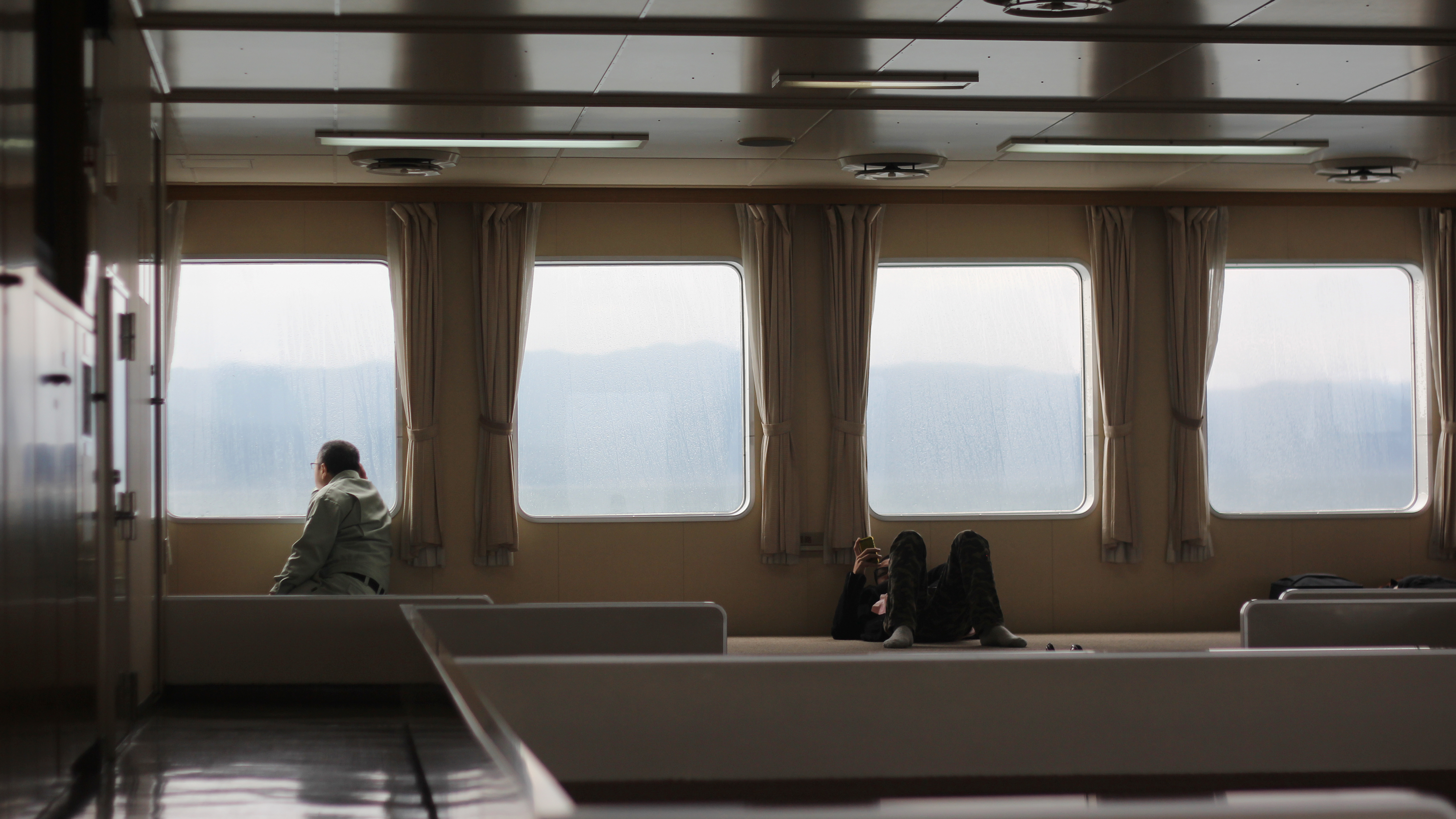
The number of actual seats has traditionally been very limited like on this Japanese passenger ferry, with larger spaces dedicated to tatami or broadloom areas where passengers can sit or lie down (on Shikoku and Kyushu ferry, 2014).

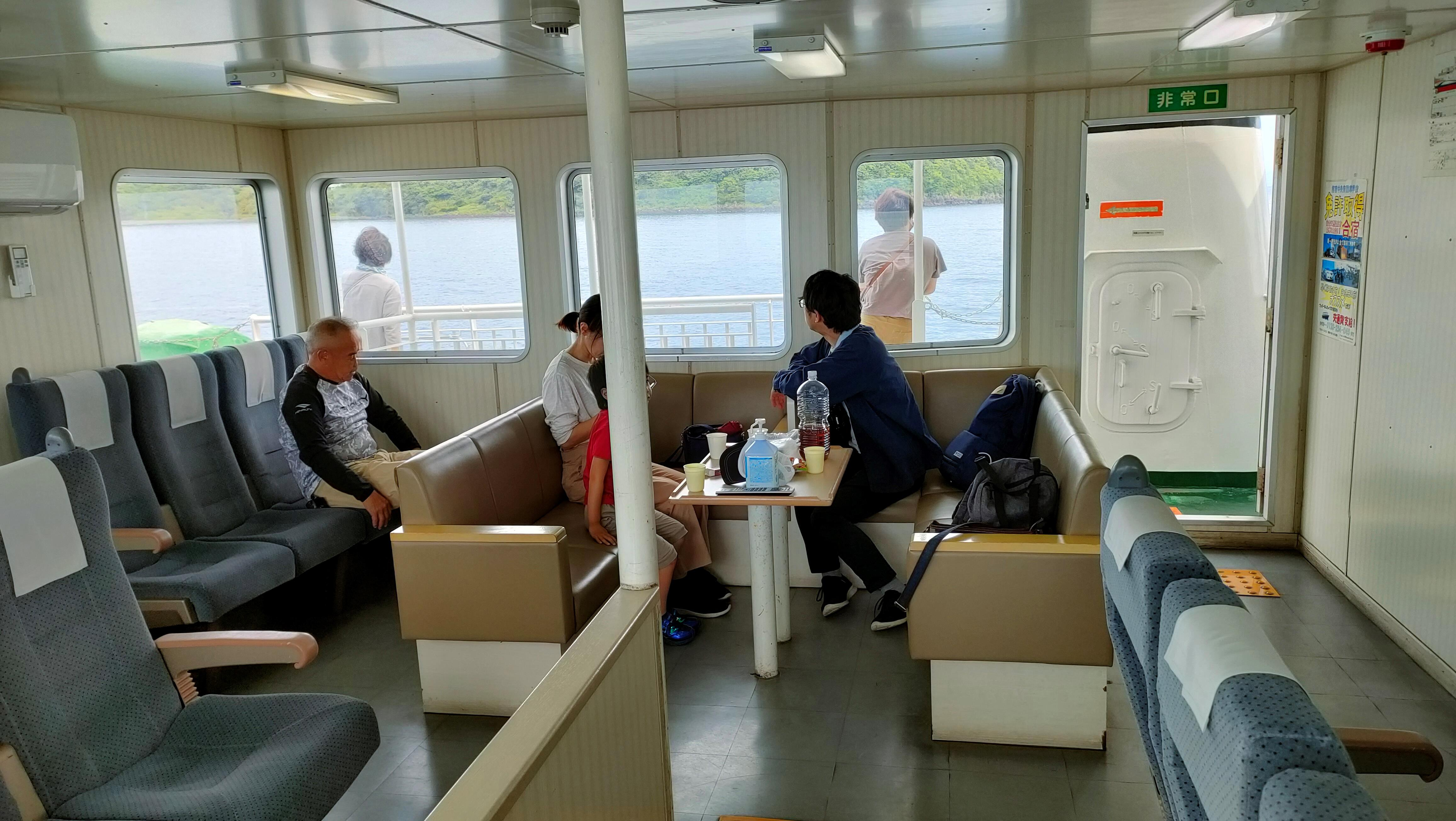
Inside a short distance ferry, the Yamagawa-Nejime Ferry, Kagoshima, Japan (2023)

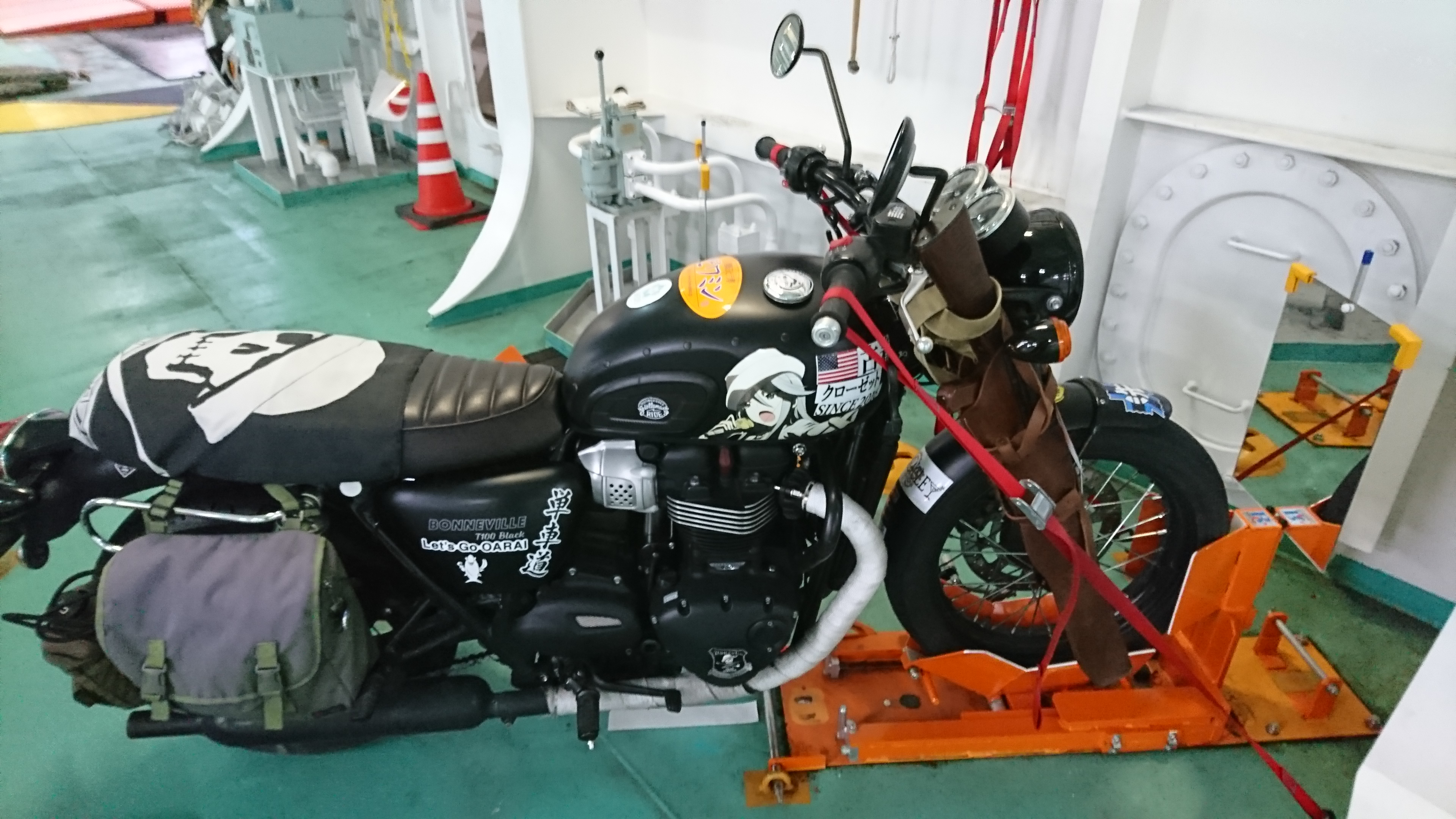
Long-distance ferries are also used by motorcyclists.(Ocean Tokyu Ferry, 2019)

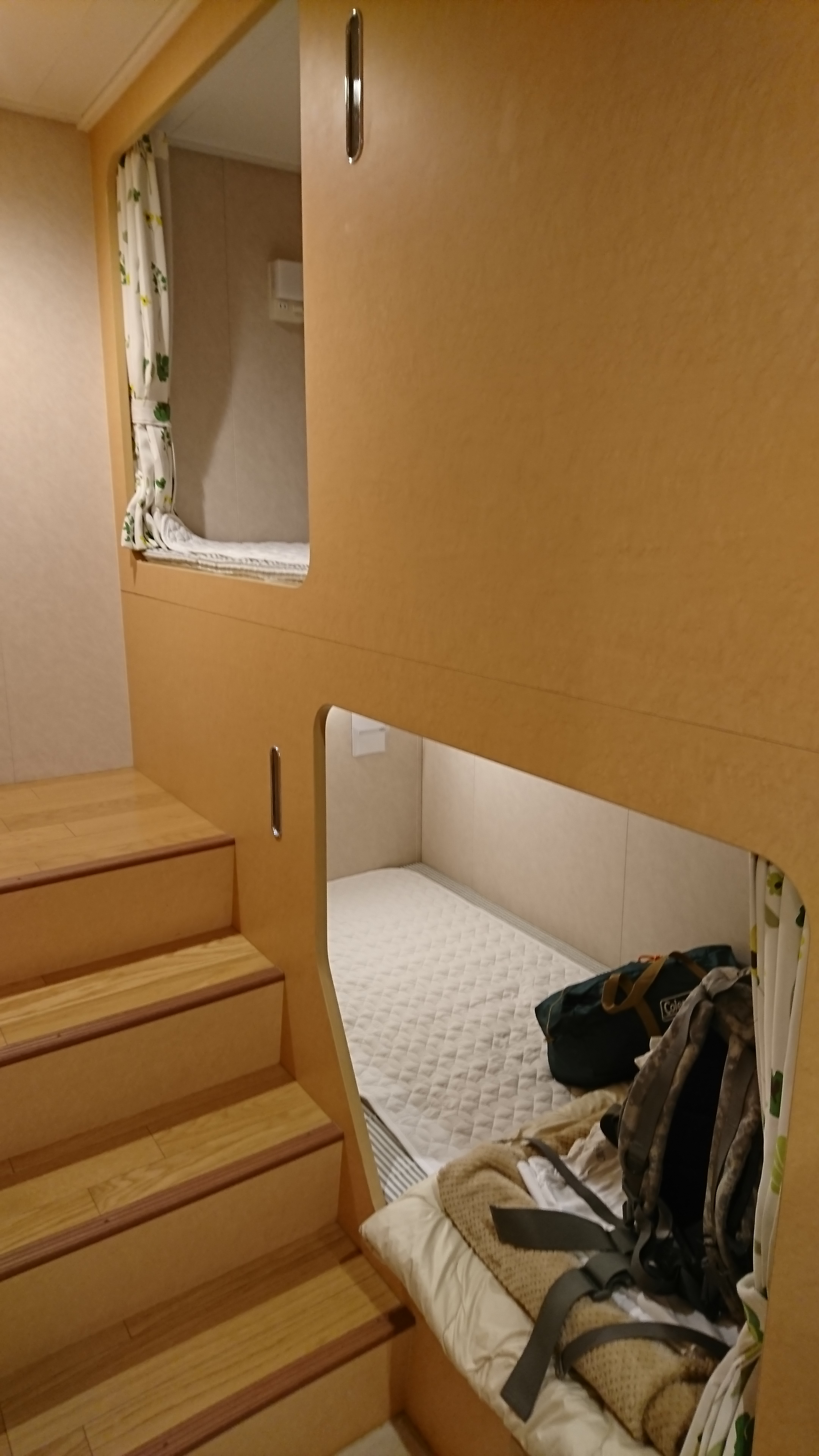
A second-class cabin on the ferry connecting Tokyo and Kitakyushu. A simple bed with curtains.(Ocean Tokyu Ferry, 2019)

==== Malaysia ====
A catamaran off the Raja Tun Uda Ferry Terminal in George Town, Penang c. 2025

The Malaysian state of Penang is home to the oldest ferry service in the country. The first regular ferry service operating across the Penang Strait between George Town and Province Wellesley (now Seberang Perai) was launched in 1894 by Quah Beng Kee and his brothers. The iconic yellow double-deck roll-on/roll-off (RORO) ferries were introduced in 1957. Between 1959 and 2002, a total of 15 vessels were commissioned for the service.

Currently operated by Penang Port Sdn Bhd, the ferry service has evolved over the decades. The RORO ferries were retired in 2021, with speedboats temporarily replacing them. In 2023, these speedboats were succeeded by four newly-built catamarans, which now serve only passengers and motorcyclists. These catamarans operate between the Raja Tun Uda Ferry Terminal in George Town and the Sultan Abdul Halim Ferry Terminal in Seberang Perai.

=== Russian Federation ===
Due to the geographical features of Russia, it has a large number of both sea and river ferry crossings. Car ferries operate from the continental part of Russia to Sakhalin, Kamchatka and Japan. The Ust-Luga – Kaliningrad ferry also runs, until February 2022 ferries also ran from St. Petersburg to different cities of the Baltic Sea. Before the construction of the Kerch Bridge, there was a ferry across the Kerch Strait, whose service was resumed after the Kerch bridge explosion. There are also more than 100 ferry crossings on different rivers in Russia. These are usually symmetrical through ferries with two ramps for quick entry and exit of cars. For some categories of car owners, these ferries may be free if there is no alternative crossing of the river.

=== Europe ===
==== Scotland ====
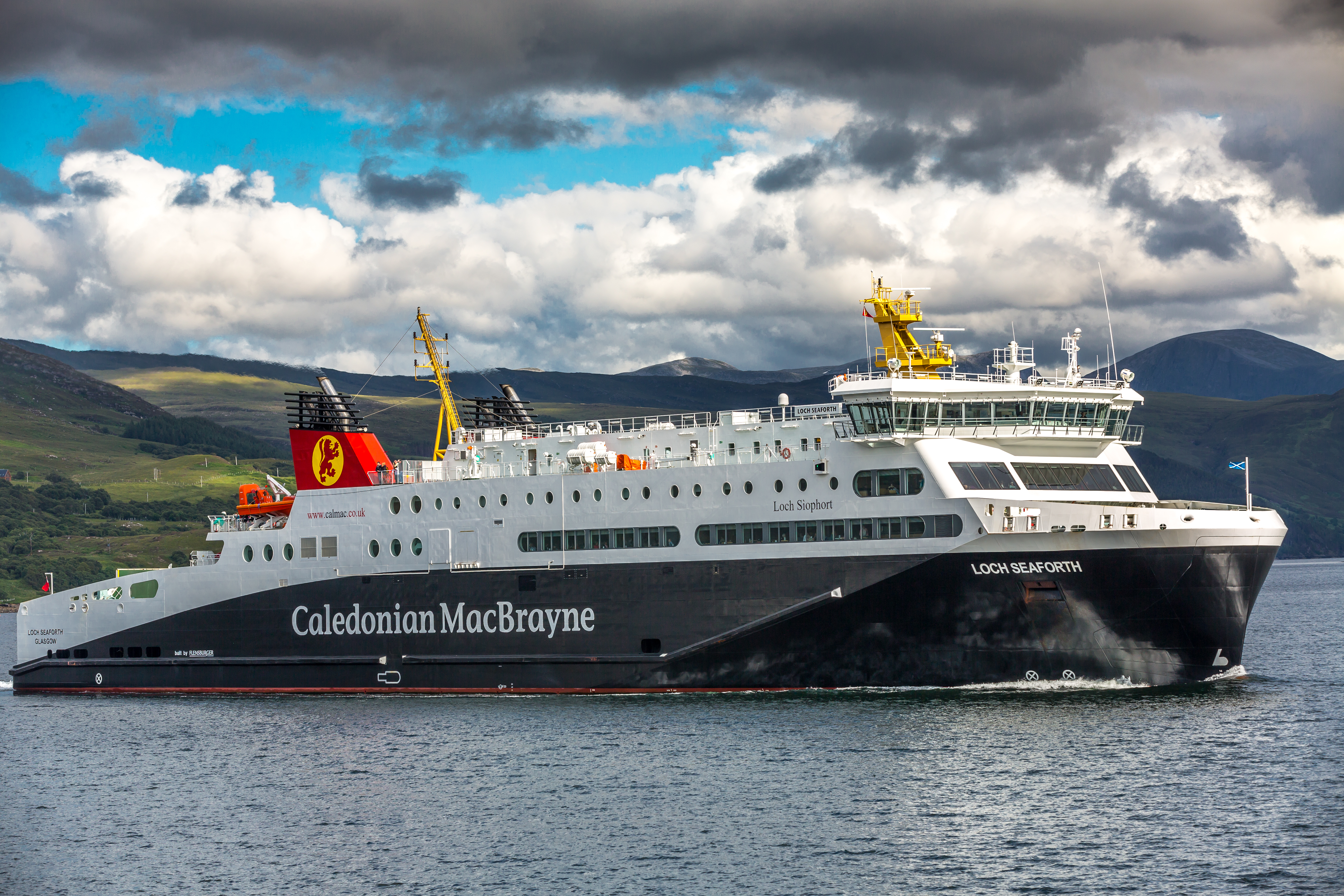
Loch Seaforth in Ullapool

In Scotland, ferry services form a vital part of the national transport network, connecting the mainland with more than sixty inhabited islands and linking remote peninsulas to the rest of the country. Caledonian MacBrayne (CalMac), operating under contract with Transport Scotland, runs the largest network, serving communities across the west coast and the Hebrides. A range of smaller operators, including local authorities and private companies, provide additional river, coastal, and inter-island services. Scotland also has ferry services operating across the Irish sea operated by P&O Ferries and Stena Line connecting to destinations in Northern Ireland including Belfast and Larne.

Ferries have long played an important role in Scotland's transport history, and they remain essential today for residents, freight, and tourism owing to the country's rugged coastline and widely dispersed island communities.

==== England ====
The busiest seaway in the world, the English Channel, connects England and mainland Europe, with ships sailing from the English ports of Dover, Newhaven, Poole, Portsmouth and Plymouth to French ports, such as Calais, Dunkirk, Dieppe, Roscoff, Cherbourg-Octeville, Caen, St Malo and Le Havre. The busiest ferry route to France is the Dover to Calais crossing with approximately 9,168,000 passengers using the service in 2018. Ferries from England also sail to Belgium, the Netherlands, Norway, Spain and Ireland. Some ferries carry mainly tourist traffic, but most also carry freight, and some are exclusively for the use of freight lorries. In England, car-carrying ferries are sometimes referred to as RORO (roll-on, roll-off) for the ease by which vehicles can board and leave.

==== Denmark ====
The busiest single ferry route in terms of the number of departures is across the northern part of Øresund, between Helsingborg, Scania, Sweden and Elsinore, Denmark. Before the Øresund bridge was opened in July 2000, car and "car and train" ferries departed up to seven times every hour (every 8.5 minutes). This has since been reduced, but a car ferry still departs from each harbor every 15 minutes during daytime. The route is around 2.2 nautical miles (4.1 km; 2.5 mi) and the crossing takes 22 minutes. Today, all ferries on this route are constructed so that they do not need to turn around in the harbors. This also means that the ferries lack stems and sterns, since the vessels sail in both directions. Starboard and port-side are dynamic, depending on the direction the ferry sails. Despite the short crossing, the ferries are equipped with restaurants (on three out of four ferries), cafeterias, and kiosks. Passengers without cars often make a double or triple return journey in the restaurants; for this, a single journey ticket is sufficient. Passenger and bicycle passenger tickets are inexpensive compared with longer routes.

==== Baltic Sea ====
Large cruiseferries sail in the Baltic Sea between Finland, Åland, Sweden, Estonia, Latvia and Saint Petersburg, Russia. In many ways, these ferries are like cruise ships, but they can also carry hundreds of cars on car decks. Besides providing passenger and car transport across the sea, Baltic Sea cruiseferries are a popular tourist destination unto themselves, with multiple restaurants, nightclubs, bars, shops and entertainment on board. Helsinki was the busiest international passenger ferry port in the world in 2017 with over 11.8 million passengers whilst the second business international ferry port, Dover, had 11.7 million passengers. The Helsinki-Tallinn route alone accounted for nine million passengers. In 2022 the port of Helsinki had almost 8 million passengers, of which 6.3 million travelled between Helsinki and Tallinn. Additionally many smaller ferries operate on domestic routes in Finland, Sweden and Estonia.

The south-west and southern parts of the Baltic Sea has several routes mainly for heavy traffic and cars. The ferry routes of Rødby-Puttgarden, Trelleborg-Rostock, Trelleborg-Travemünde, Trelleborg-Świnoujście, Gedser-Rostock, Gdynia-Karlskrona, and Ystad-Świnoujście are all typical transports ferries. On the longer of these routes, simple cabins are available. Some of these routes previously also carried trains, but since 2020 these trains are instead routed around the Baltic via the Great Belt fixed link and Jutland.

==== Turkey ====
In Istanbul, ferries connect the European and Asian shores of Bosphorus, as well as Princes' Islands and nearby coastal towns. In 2014, İDO transported 47 million passengers, the largest ferry system in the world.

==== Italy ====
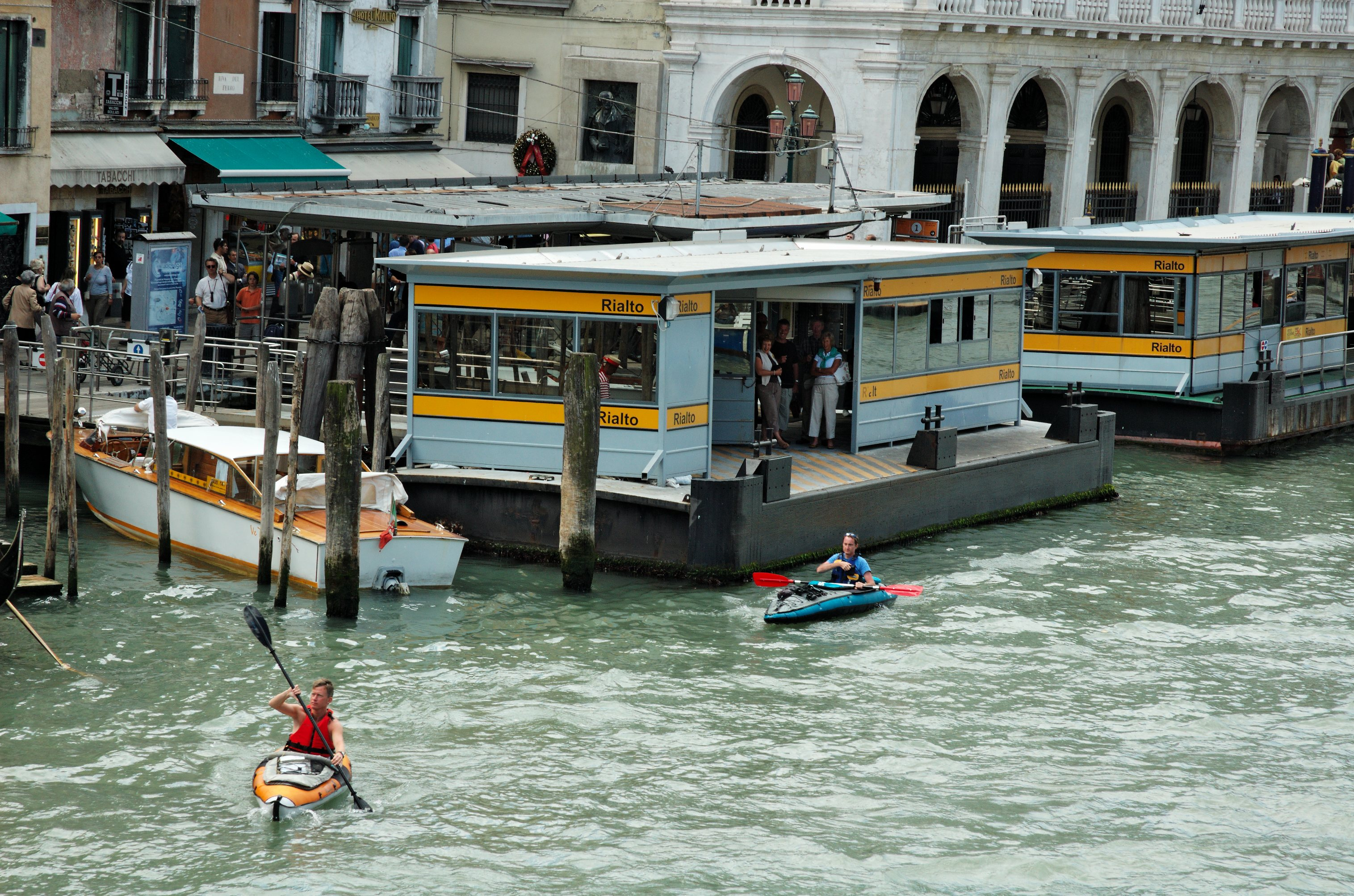
The Rialto water bus station in Venice, Italy

The largest ferry system in Italy is in Venice. The city's water buses (Italian: vaporetti) provide service all around the city. They can carry hundreds of people. They operate on a series of lines that stop at different locations around Venice.

==== Sweden ====
The world's shortest ferry line is the Ferry Lina in Töreboda, Sweden. It takes around 20–25 seconds and is hand powered.

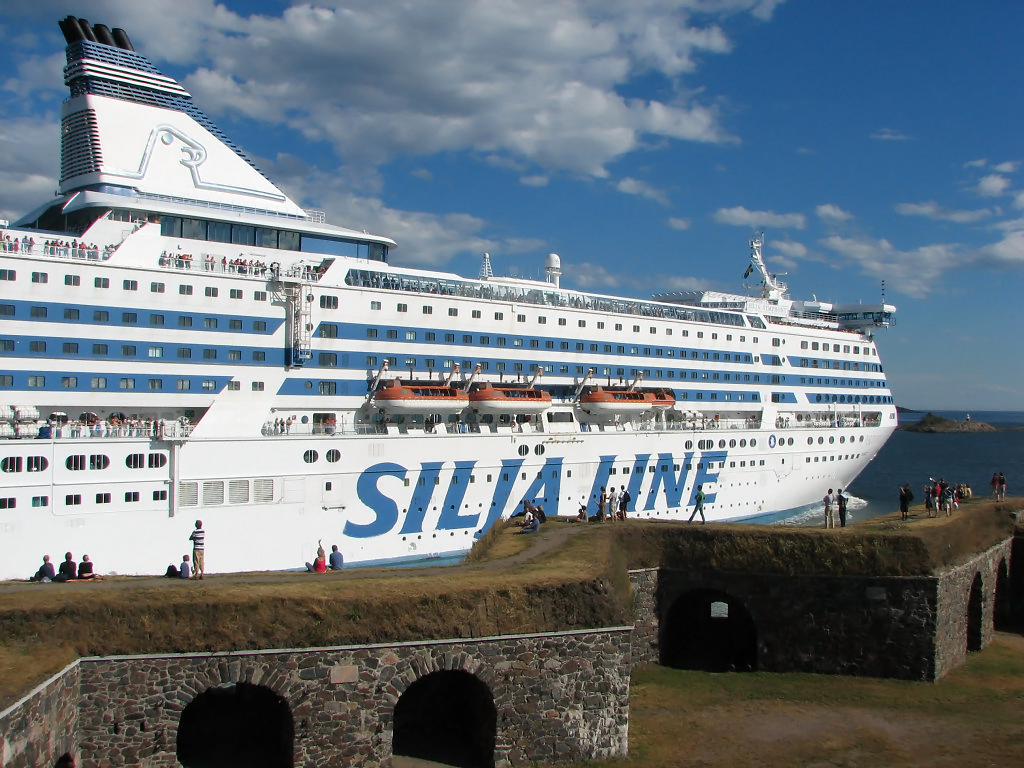
MS Silja Symphony leaving Helsinki via the Kustaanmiekka strait to the Baltic Sea.

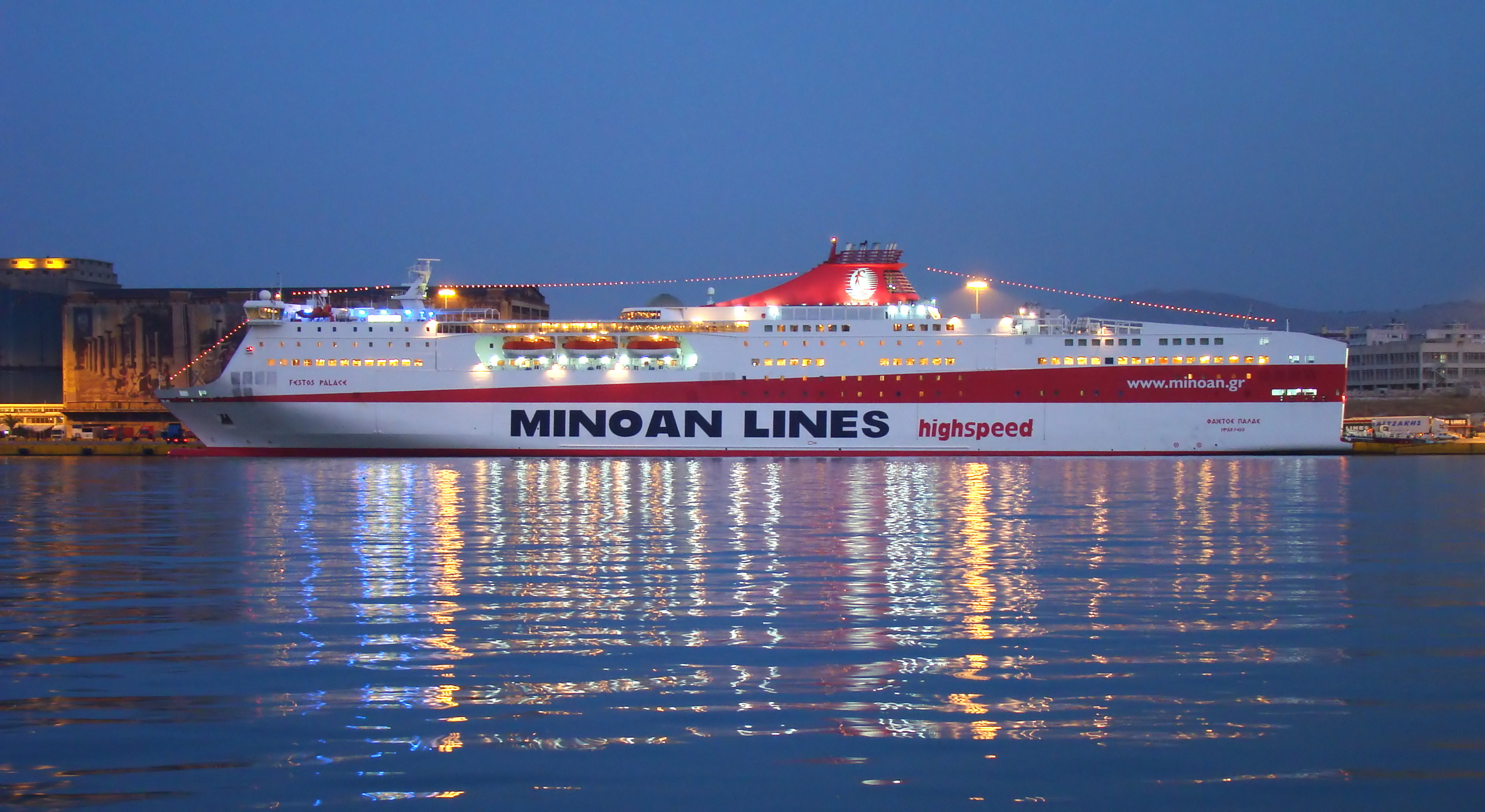
Ro-Pax Festos Palace in Piraeus, Greece

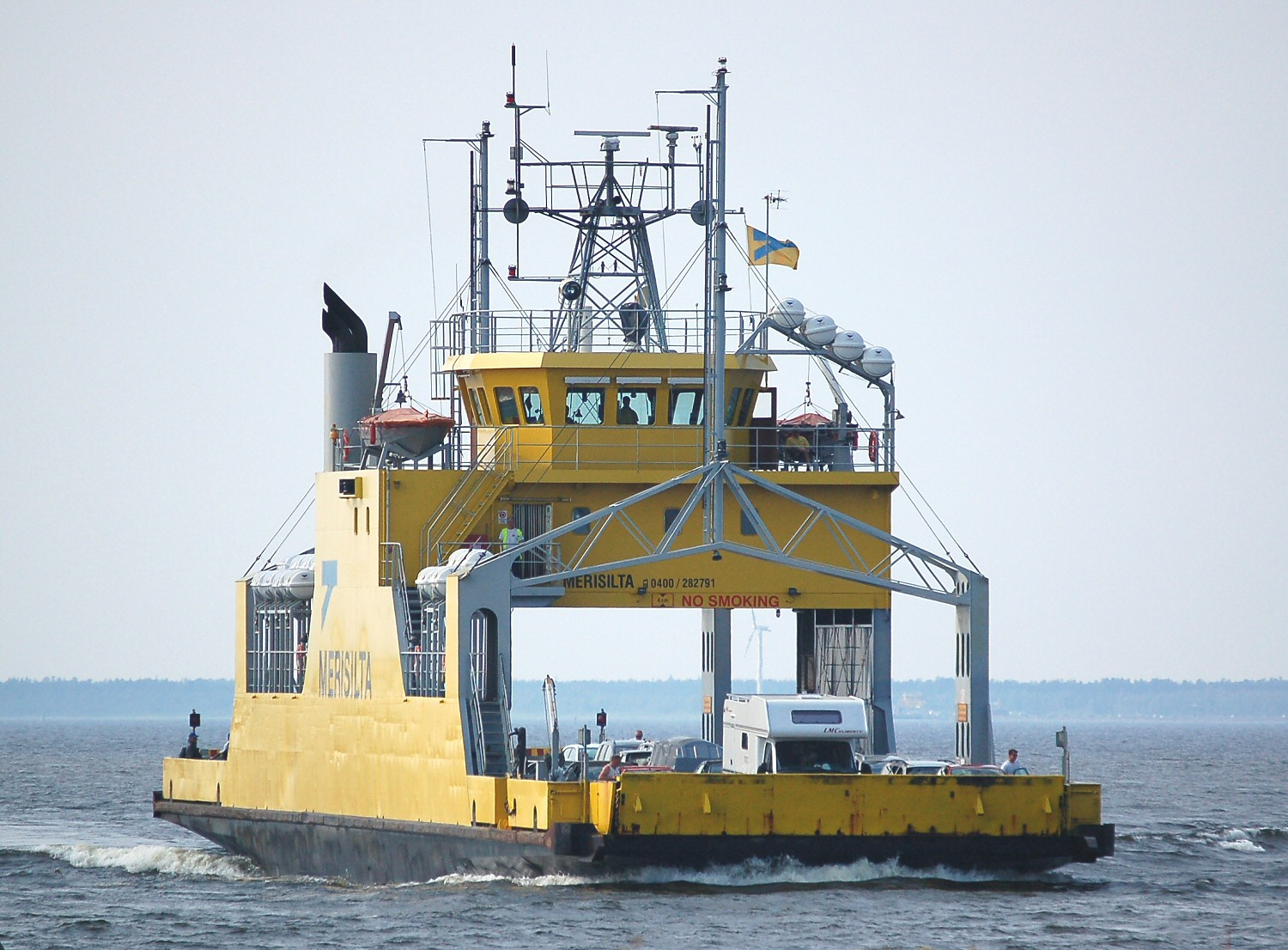
A road ferry between Oulu and the Hailuoto Island on the Bothnian Bay
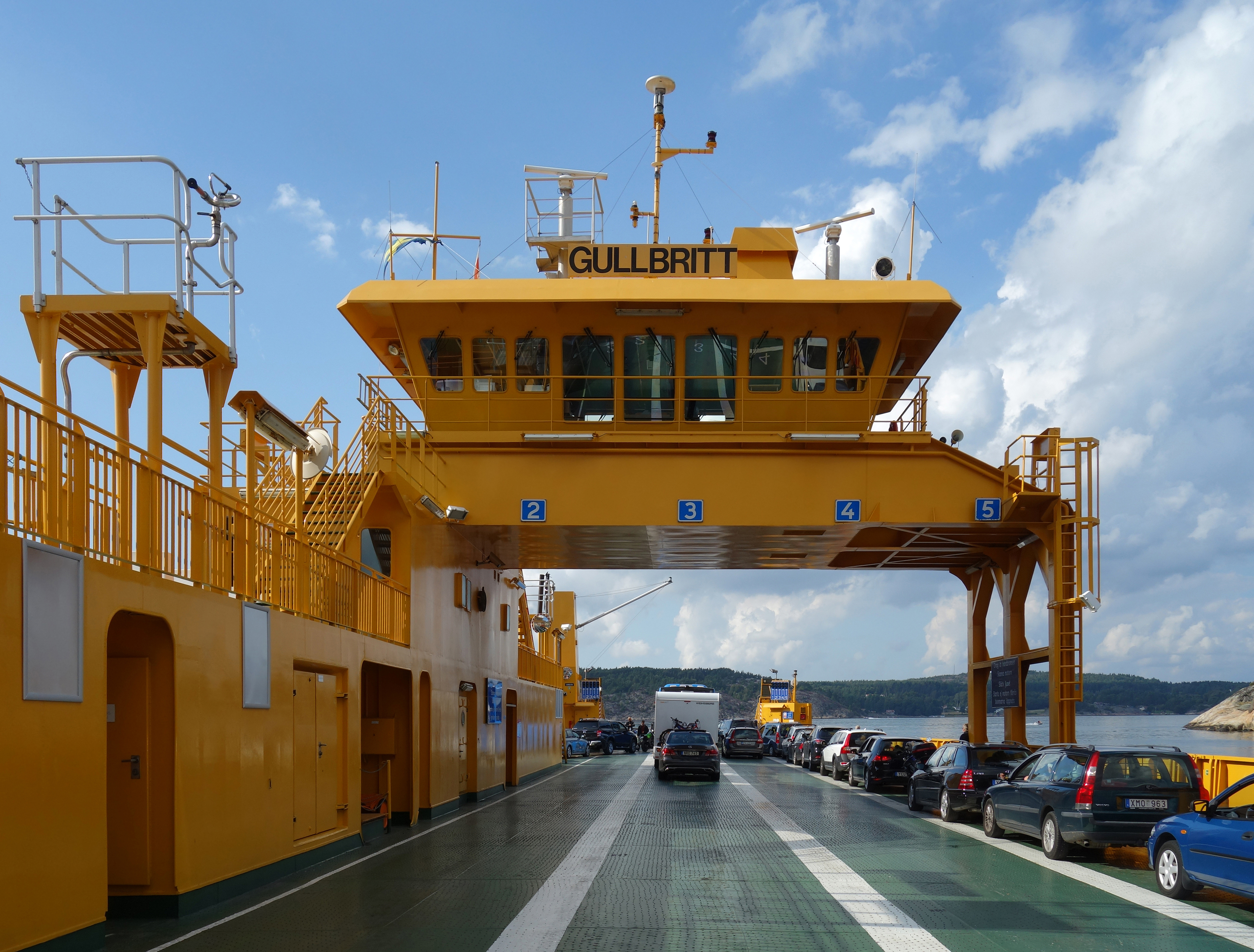
M/S Gullbritt in the Gullmar Fjord close to Lysekil, Sweden. Sweden has many of these yellow ferries that are run by the Swedish Transport Administration. Almost all of them are free of charge.

=== North America ===
==== Canada ====
Due to the numbers of large freshwater lakes and length of shoreline in Canada, various provinces and territories have ferry services.

On Canada's west coast, BC Ferries operates the third largest ferry service in the world. Travellers are carried from various points on the British Columbia mainland to destinations such as Vancouver Island, the Gulf Islands and Haida Gwaii. In 2015, BC Ferries carried more than 8 million vehicles and 20 million passengers.

Other operations include the Seabus, a part of Vancouver's public transit system which crosses Burrard Inlet, and False Creek Ferries, a privately operated service that operates in and around False Creek. Multiple inland ferries also operate across various lakes and rivers throughout the province.

The east coast has been home to numerous inter- and intra-provincial ferry and coastal services, including a large network operated by the federal government under CN Marine and later Marine Atlantic. Private and publicly owned ferry operations in eastern Canada include Marine Atlantic, serving the island of Newfoundland, as well as Bay Ferries, Northumberland Ferries, CTMA, Coastal Transport, and STQ. Canadian waters in the Great Lakes once hosted numerous ferry services, but these have been reduced to those offered by Owen Sound Transportation Company and several smaller operations. There are also several commuter passenger ferry services operated in major cities, such as Metro Transit in Halifax, and Toronto Island ferries in Toronto. There is also the Société des traversiers du Québec.

==== United States ====
The largest ferry system in the United States is the public Washington State Ferries system in the Pacific Northwest, which has ten routes on Puget Sound and around the San Juan Islands. In 2025, the system carried 20.1 million total passengers and 9.4 million vehicles aboard its 21 vessels, which are able to carry up to 1,793 passengers and 202 vehicles on a single trip. The ferries serve commuters in the Seattle metropolitan area as well as tourist and recreational traffic. They are integrated into the state highway system and operated by the Washington State Department of Transportation. The region also has a number of passenger-only services that are operated by other public agencies as well as private companies. Kitsap Transit operates local foot ferries within its local area and "fast ferries" to Seattle that carried 1.2 million passengers in 2024.

Due to the North Carolina coast's geography, consisting of numerous sounds, inlets, tidal arms, and islands, ferry transportation is essential in the region. The state operates twelve routes, eight of which are under the oversight of the North Carolina Department of Transportation Ferry Division, three of which are under the direct oversight of the North Carolina Department of Transportation, and one of which is under the oversight of the North Carolina Division of Parks and Recreation. Three of the Ferry Division routes are tolled, and all ferry routes operated by the North Carolina Department of Transportation carry both vehicles and pedestrians, although certain vessels only carry pedestrians and cyclists. The National Park Service additionally works with private companies to offer ferry service to locations such as Cape Lookout and Portsmouth.

The Alaska Marine Highway System provides service between Bellingham, Washington, and various towns and villages throughout Southeast and Southwest Alaska, including crossings of the Gulf of Alaska. AMHS provides access to many small communities with no road connection or airport.

The Staten Island Ferry in New York City, sailing between the boroughs of Manhattan and Staten Island, is the nation's single busiest ferry route by passenger volume. Unlike riders on many other ferry services, Staten Island Ferry passengers do not pay any fare to ride it. New York City also has a network of smaller ferries, or water taxis, that shuttle commuters along the Hudson River from locations in New Jersey and Northern Manhattan down to the midtown, downtown and Wall Street business centers. Several ferry companies also offer service linking midtown and lower Manhattan with locations in the boroughs of Queens and Brooklyn, crossing the city's East River. New York City Mayor Bill de Blasio announced in February 2015 that city would begin an expanded Citywide Ferry Service, and launched as NYC Ferry in 2017, linking heretofore relatively isolated communities such as Manhattan's Lower East Side, Soundview in The Bronx, Astoria and the Rockaways in Queens and such Brooklyn neighborhoods as Bay Ridge, Sunset Park, and Red Hook with existing ferry landings in Lower Manhattan and Midtown Manhattan. A second expansion phase connected Staten Island to the West Side of Manhattan, and added a stop in Throgs Neck, in the Bronx. NYC Ferry is now the largest passenger fleet in the United States.

The New Orleans area also has many ferries that carry both vehicles and pedestrians. Most notable is the Algiers Ferry, which has been in continuous operation since 1827 and is one of the oldest operating ferries in North America. In New England, vehicle-carrying ferry services between mainland Cape Cod and the islands of Martha's Vineyard and Nantucket are operated by The Woods Hole, Martha's Vineyard and Nantucket Steamship Authority, which sails year-round between Woods Hole and Vineyard Haven as well as Hyannis and Nantucket. Seasonal service is also operated from Woods Hole to Oak Bluffs during the summer and fall. As there are no bridges or tunnels connecting the islands to the mainland, The Steamship Authority ferries in addition to being the only method for transporting private cars to or from the islands, also ferry heavy freight and supplies, such as construction materials and fuel, competing with tug and barge companies. Additionally, Hy-Line Cruises operates high-speed catamaran service from Hyannis to both islands, and several smaller operations run seasonal passenger-only service primarily geared towards tourist day-trippers from other mainland ports, including New Bedford, (New Bedford Fast Ferry) Falmouth, (Island Queen ferry and Falmouth Ferry) and Harwich (Freedom Cruise Line). Ferries also bring riders and vehicles across Long Island Sound to such Connecticut cities as Bridgeport and New London, and to Block Island in Rhode Island from points on Long Island.

Transbay commuting in the San Francisco Bay Area was primarily ferry-based until bridges were built from the 1920s to the 1960s. Prior to the bridges, car ferries were popular. Large trains were also moved across the water on ferries, reducing the time to go around the rivers and bay. By the 1970s, ferries were primarily used by tourists with Golden Gate Ferry, an organization under the ownership of the same governing body as the Golden Gate Bridge, left as the sole commute operator. The 1989 Loma Prieta earthquake prompted the restoration of service to the East Bay. The modern ferry network is primarily under the authority of San Francisco Bay Ferry, connecting with cities as far as Vallejo. Tourist excursions are also offered by Blue & Gold Fleet and Red & White Fleet. A ferry serves Angel Island (which also accepts private craft). Alcatraz is served exclusively by ferry service administered by the National Park Service.

Until the completion of the Mackinac Bridge in the 1950s, ferries were used for vehicle transportation between the Lower and the Upper Peninsulas of Michigan, across the Straits of Mackinac in the United States. Ferry service for bicycles and passengers continues across the straits for transport to Mackinac Island, where motorized vehicles are almost completely prohibited. This crossing is made possible by two ferry lines Shepler's Ferry and Mackinac Island Ferry Company (formerly Star Line).

A ferry service runs between Milwaukee, Wisconsin and Muskegon, Michigan operated by Lake Express. Another ferry SS Badger operates between Manitowoc, Wisconsin and Ludington, Michigan. Both cross Lake Michigan.

Numerous additional inland ferry routes exist in the United States, such as the Cave-In-Rock Ferry across the Ohio River, and the Benton-Houston Ferry across the Tennessee River.

==== Mexico ====
Mexico has ferry services run by Baja Ferries that connect La Paz located on the Baja California Peninsula with Mazatlán and Topolobampo. Passenger ferries also run from Playa del Carmen to the island of Cozumel.

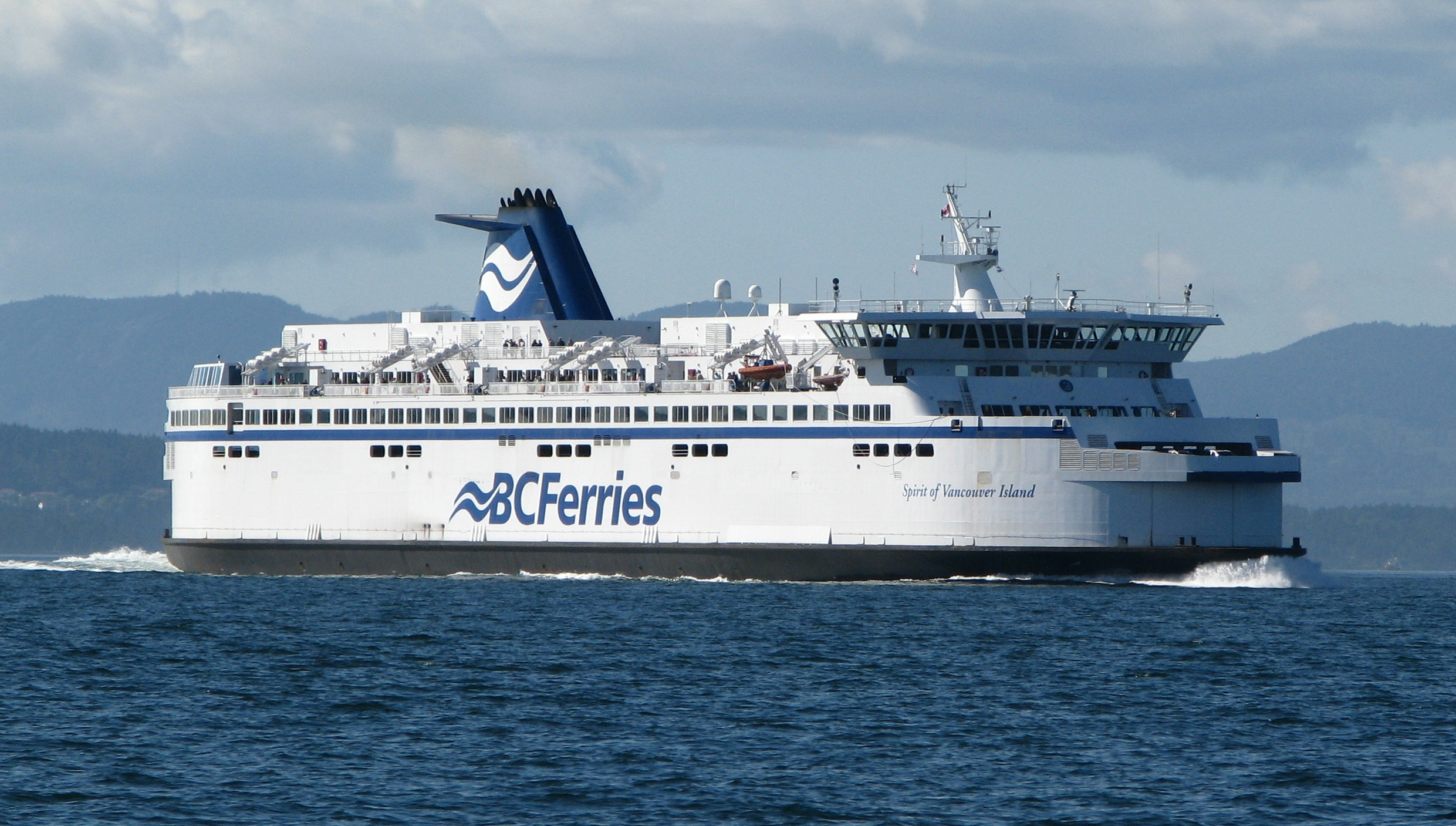
Spirit of Vancouver Island en route to Tsawwassen from Swartz Bay. Route 1 is BC Ferries busiest route.

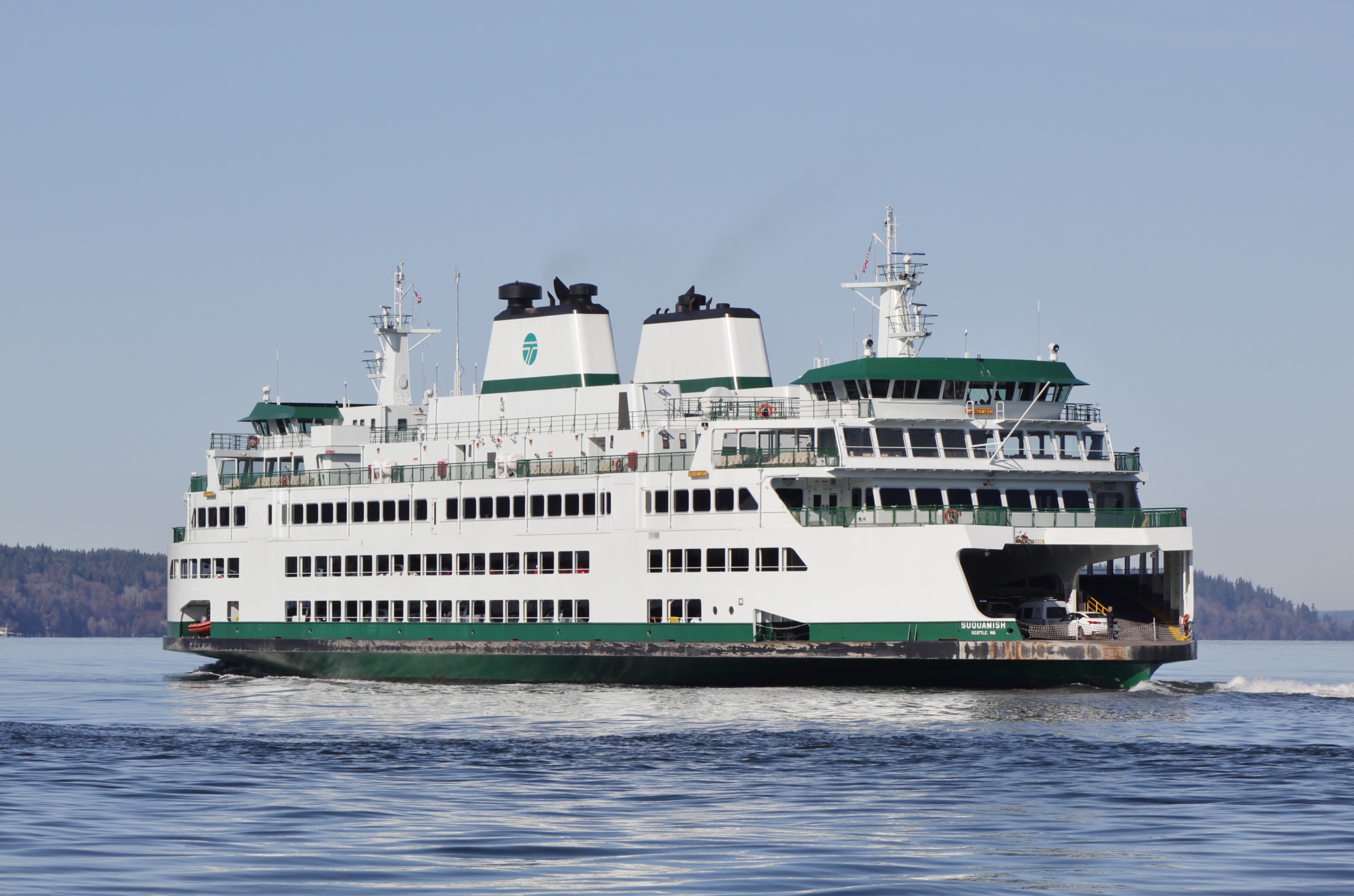
MV Suquamish sailing from Mukilteo to Clinton, one of ten routes served by Washington State Ferries.

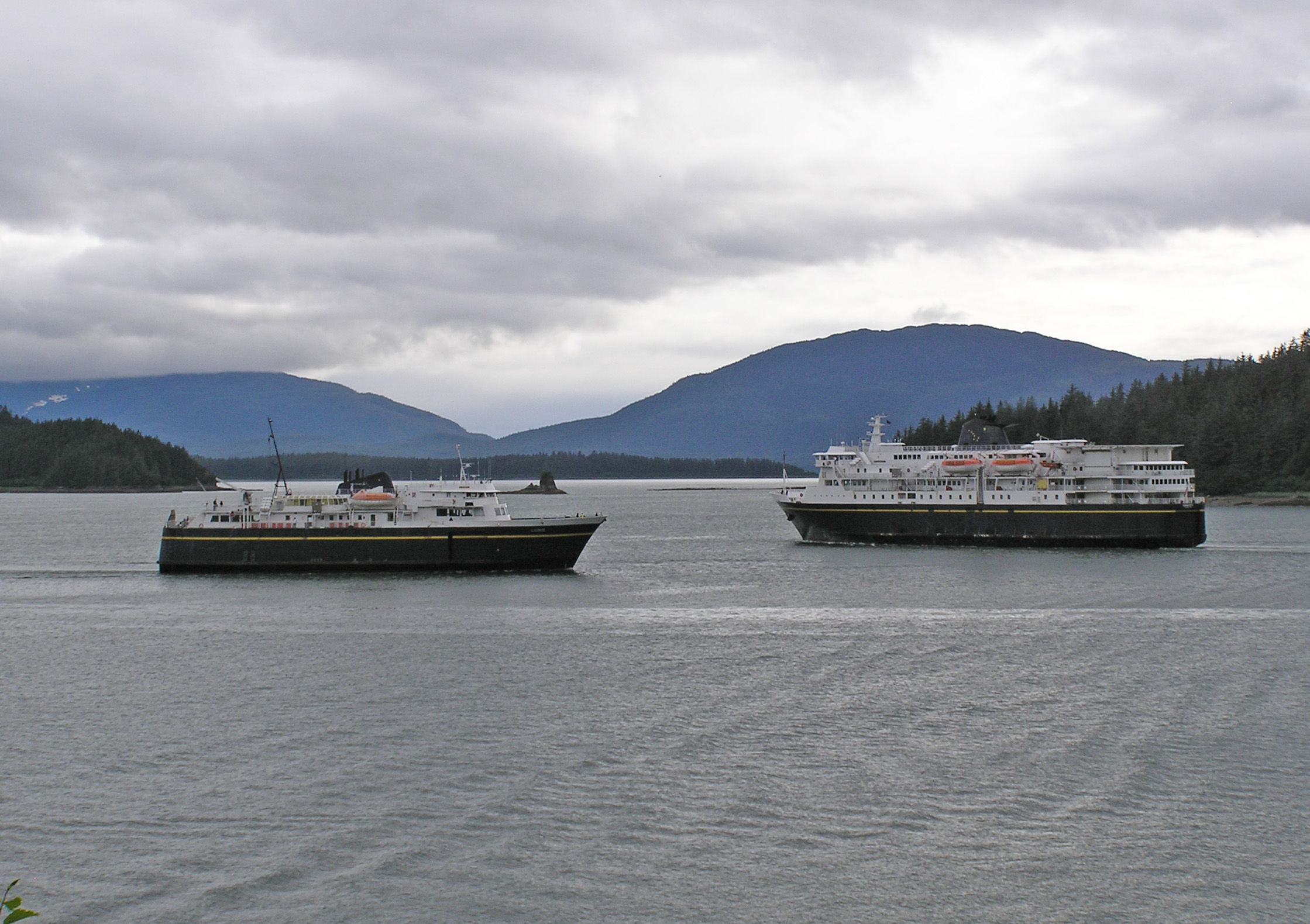
Alaska Marine Highway System ferries MV LeConte and MV Kennicott near Juneau, Alaska

=== South America ===
There are several ferries in South America.

Chacao Channel has ferry lines.

=== Oceania ===
==== Australia ====
In Australia, two Spirit of Tasmania ferries carry passengers and vehicles 450 kilometres (280 mi) across Bass Strait, the body of water that separates Tasmania from the Australian mainland, often under turbulent sea conditions. These run overnight but also include day crossings in peak time. Both ferries are based in the northern Tasmanian port city of Devonport and sail to Geelong. Before Geelong this ferry used to sail to Melbourne.

The double-ended Freshwater-class ferry cuts an iconic shape as it makes its way up and down Sydney Harbour New South Wales, Australia between Manly and Circular Quay.

==== New Zealand ====
In New Zealand, ferries connect Wellington in the North Island with Picton in the South Island, linking New Zealand's two main islands. The route is 92 kilometres (57 mi), and is run by two companies – government-owned Interislander, and independent Bluebridge, who say the trip takes three and half hours.

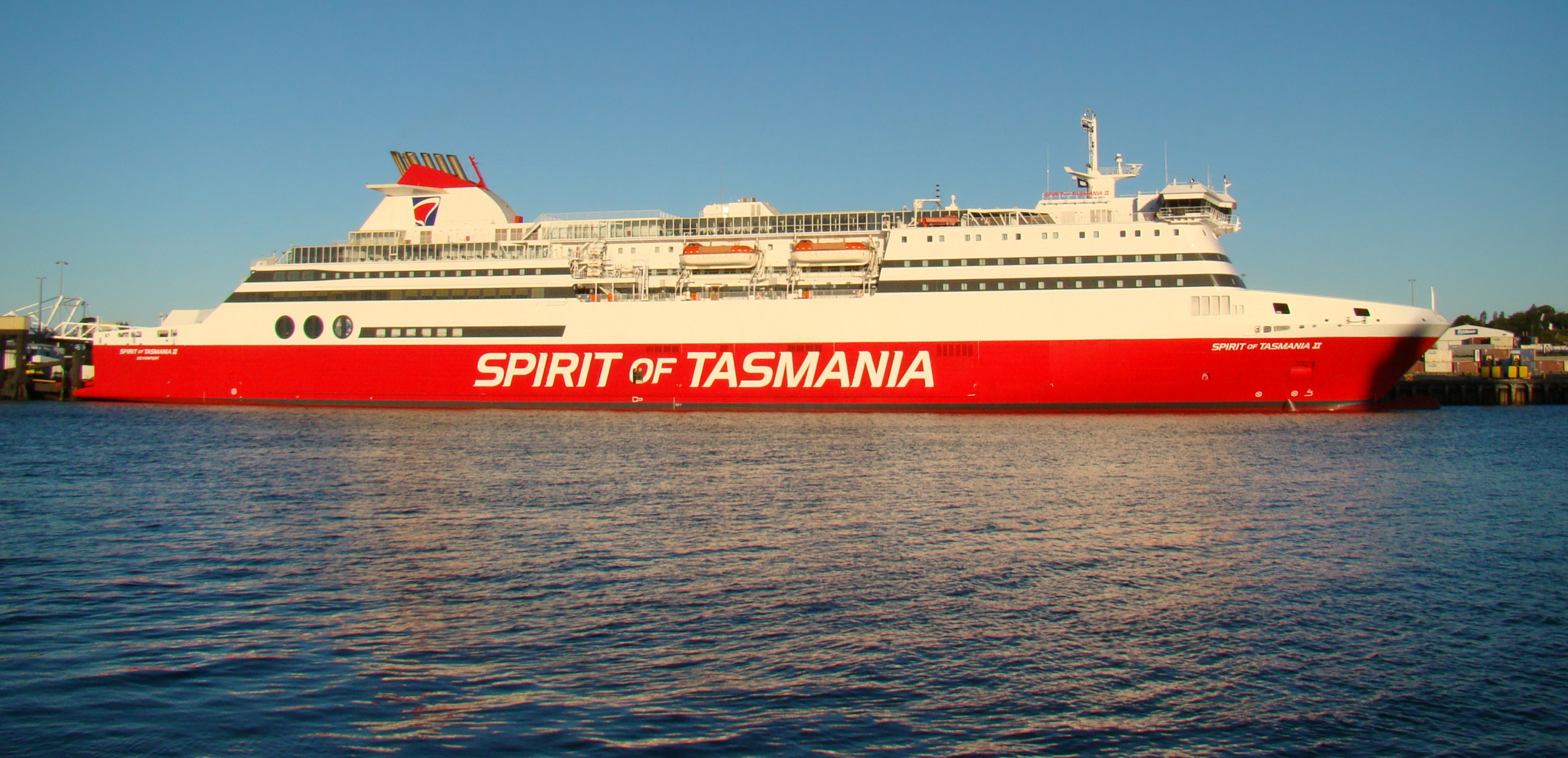
MS Spirit of Tasmania II at port in Devonport, Australia.

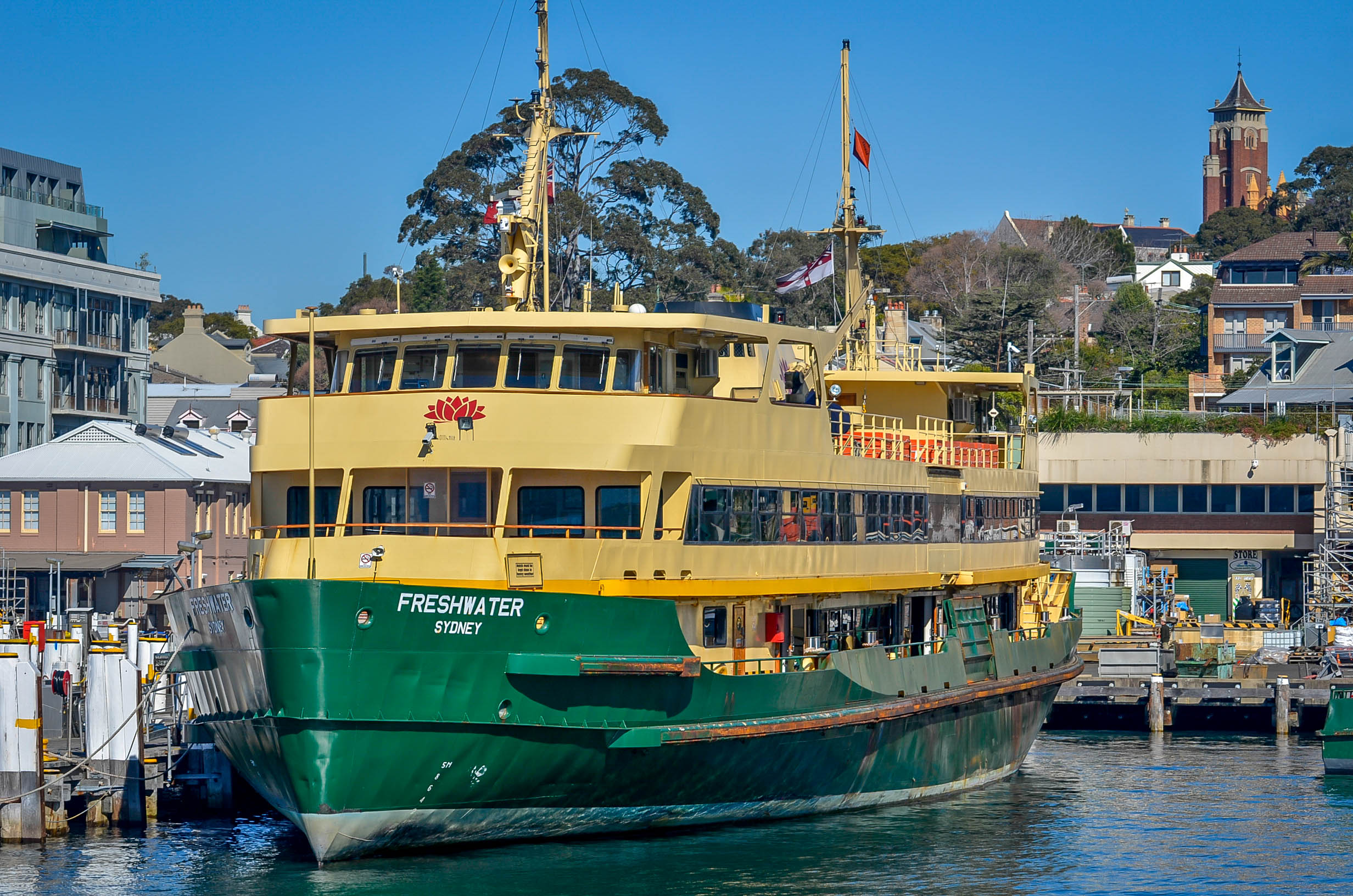
The Manly Ferry 'MV Freshwater'

== Types ==
Ferry designs depend on the length of the route, the passenger or vehicle capacity required, speed requirements and the water conditions the craft must deal with.

=== Double-ended ===
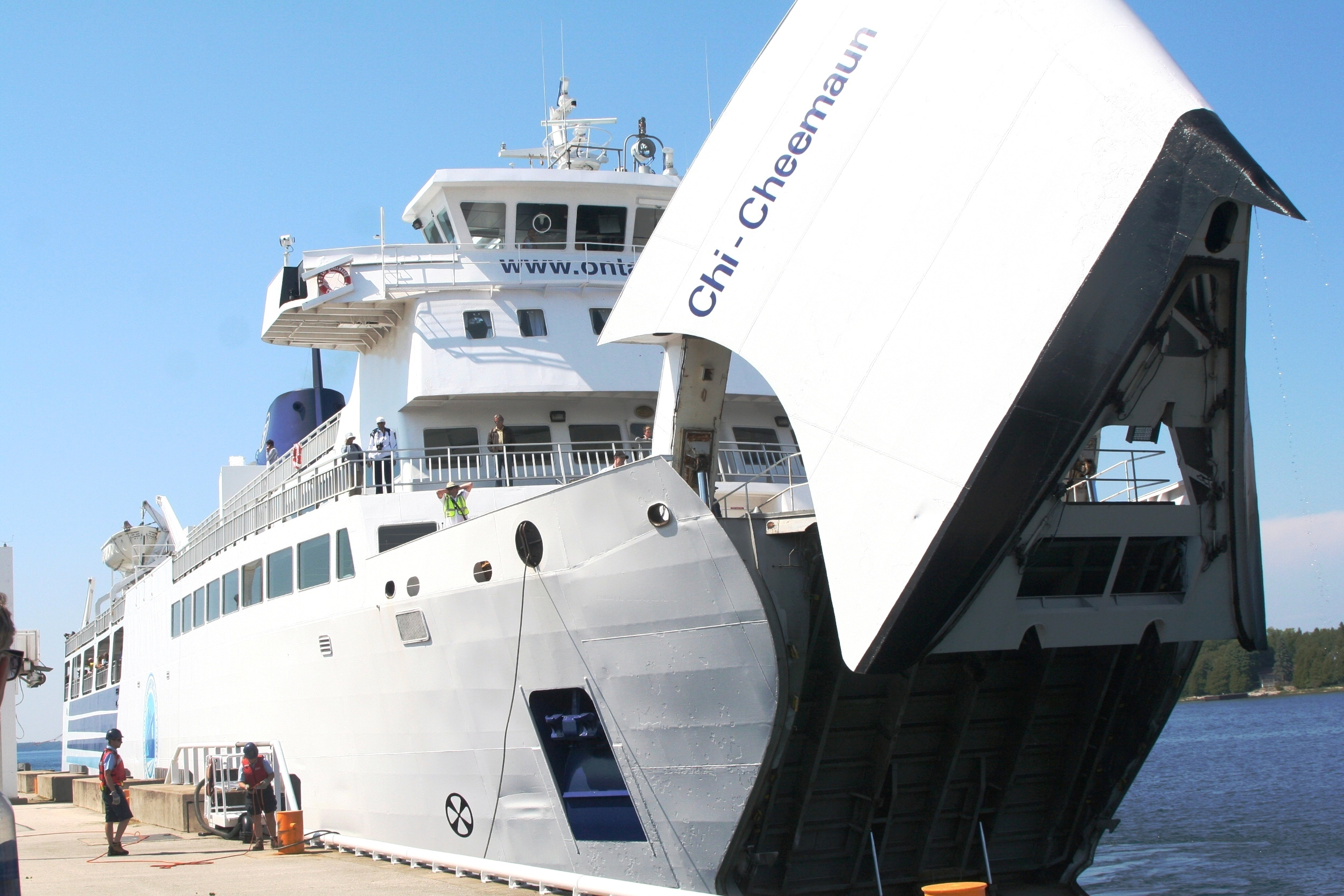
Ferry in Ontario (Manitoulin Island) vehicles load via the front and back of the ferry opening hull

Double-ended ferries have interchangeable bows and sterns, allowing them to shuttle back and forth between two terminals without having to turn around. Well-known double-ended ferry systems include the BC Ferries, the Staten Island Ferry, Washington State Ferries, Star Ferry, several ferries on the North Carolina Ferry System, and the Lake Champlain Transportation Company. Most Norwegian fjord and coastal ferries are double-ended vessels. All ferries from southern Prince Edward Island to the mainland of Canada were double-ended. This service was discontinued upon completion of the Confederation Bridge. Some ferries in Sydney, Australia and British Columbia are also double-ended. Many double-ended ferries are also constructed in Greece, in the shipyards of Perama and Salamis. Greek double-ended ferries are exported to other countries, such as Russia, where they are popular for short distance routes.

In 2008, BC Ferries launched the first of the Coastal-class ferries, which at the time were the world's largest double enders. These were surpassed as the world's largest double-enders when P&O Ferries launched their first double-ender, called the P&O Pioneer, which entered service in June 2023 replacing Pride of Kent.

=== Hydrofoil ===
Hydrofoils have the advantage of higher cruising speeds, succeeding hovercraft on some English Channel routes where the ferries now compete against the Eurotunnel and Eurostar trains that use the Channel Tunnel. Passenger-only hydrofoils also proved a practical, fast and relatively economical solution in the Canary Islands, but were recently replaced by faster catamaran "high speed" ferries that can carry cars. Their replacement by the larger craft is seen by critics as a retrograde step given that the new vessels use much more fuel and foster the inappropriate use of cars in islands already suffering from the impact of mass tourism.

=== Hovercraft ===
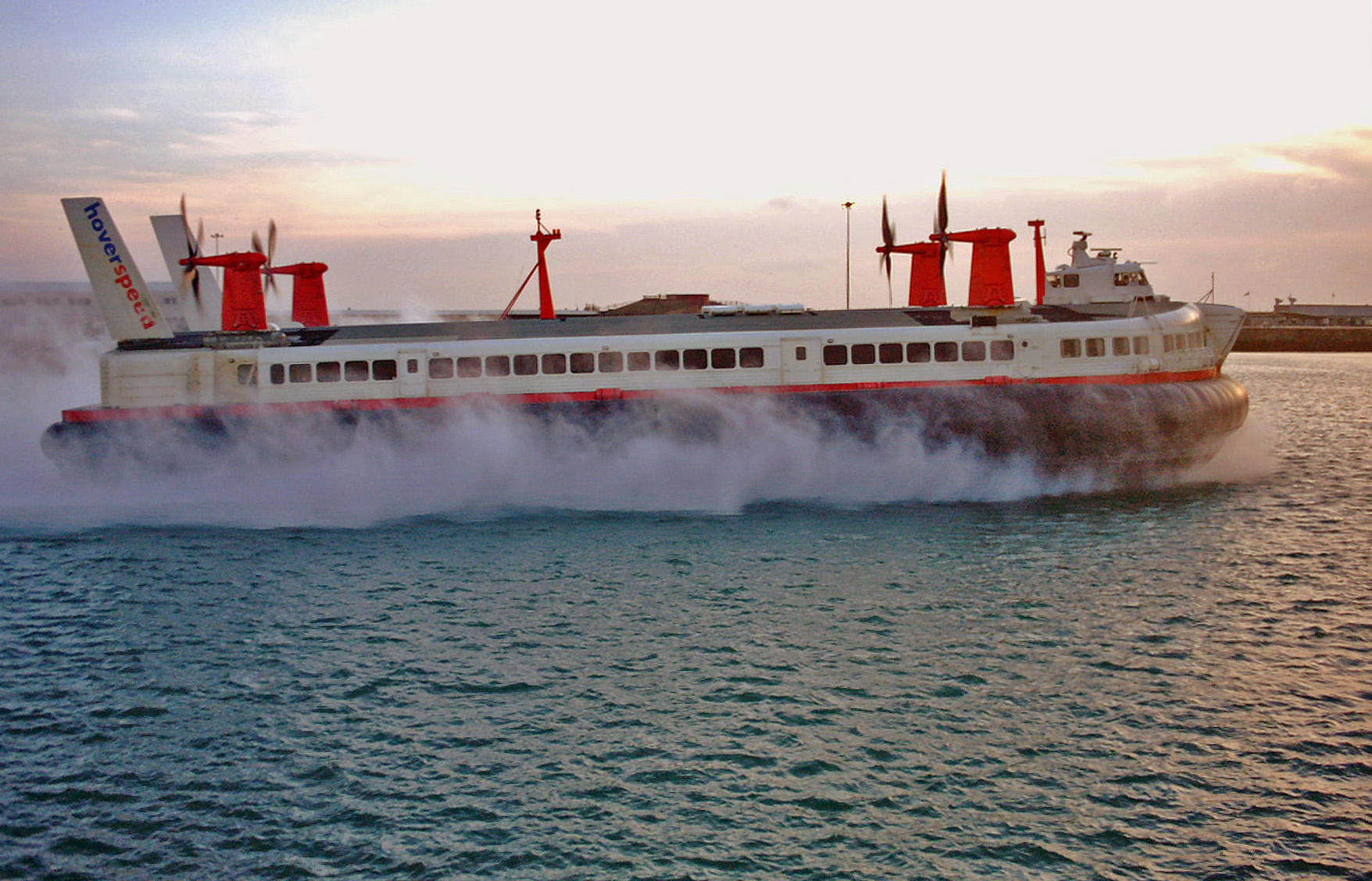
Mark 3 SR.N4 hovercraft, Dover

Hovercraft were developed in the 1960s and 1970s to carry cars. The largest was the massive SR.N4 which carried cars in its centre section with ramps at the bow and stern between England and France. The hovercraft was superseded by catamarans which are nearly as fast and are less affected by sea and weather conditions. Only one service now remains, a foot passenger service between Portsmouth and the Isle of Wight run by Hovertravel. From 1984 to 1994 Scandinavian Airlines to operated a hovercraft service between Malmö and Copenhagen Airport as a connecting "flight" for passengers from southern Sweden. The service was replaced by a regular boat in 1994 and by the Öresund bridge in 2000.

=== Catamaran ===
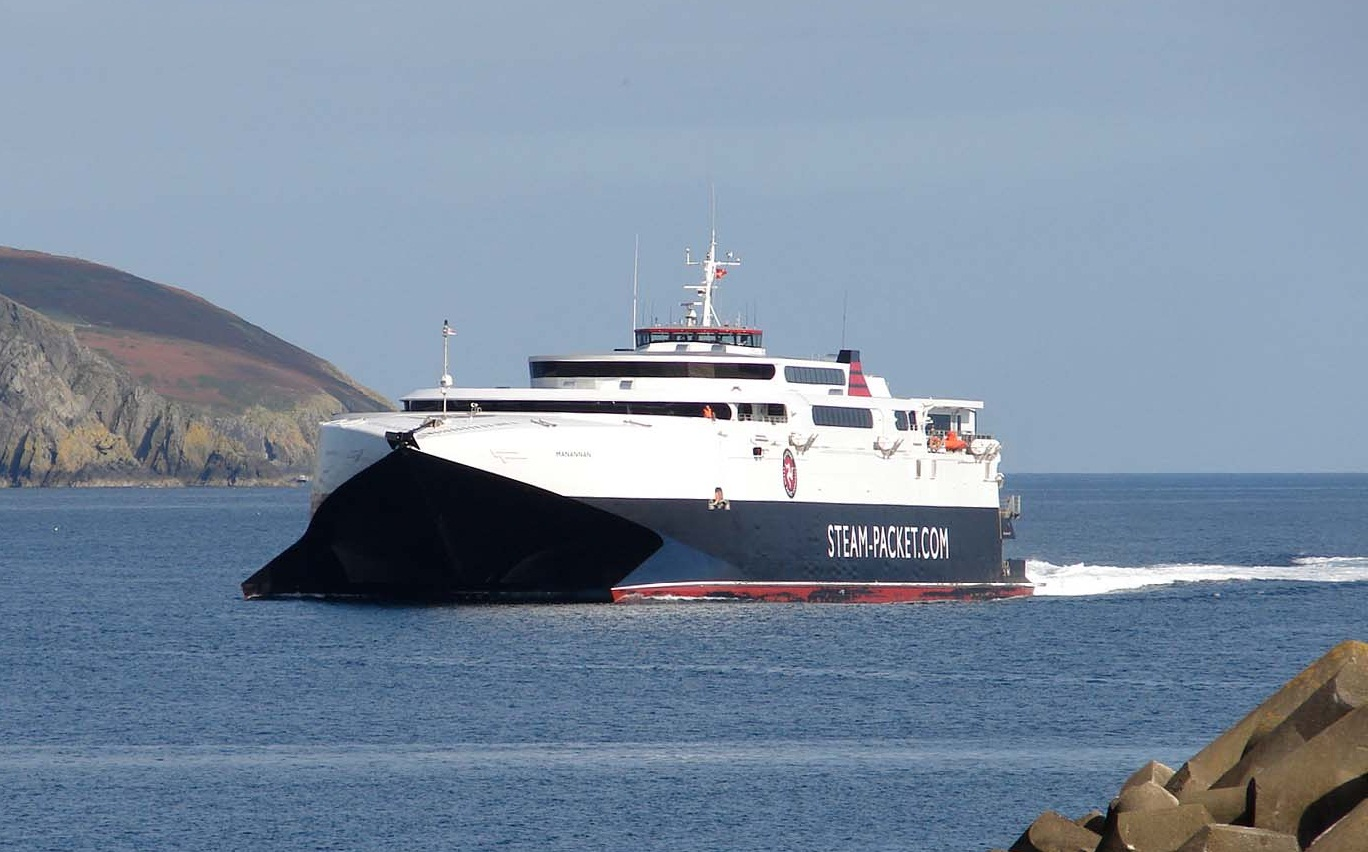
Incat built Catamaran HSC Manannan entering Douglas, Isle of Man

Since 1990 high speed catamarans have revolutionised ferry services, replacing hovercraft, hydrofoils and conventional monohull ferries. In the 1990s there were a variety of builders, but the industry has consolidated to two builders of large vehicular ferries between 60 and 120 metres. Incat of Hobart, Tasmania favours a Wave-piercing hull to deliver a smooth ride, while Austal of Perth, Western Australia builds ships based on SWATH designs. Both these companies also compete in the smaller river ferry industry with a number of other ship builders.

Stena Line once operated the largest catamarans in the world, the Stena HSS class, between the United Kingdom and Ireland. These waterjet-powered vessels, displaced 19,638 tonnes, accommodating 375 passenger cars and 1,500 passengers. Other examples of these super-size catamarans are found in the Condor Ferries fleet with the Condor Voyager and Rapide.

=== Roll-on/roll-off ===
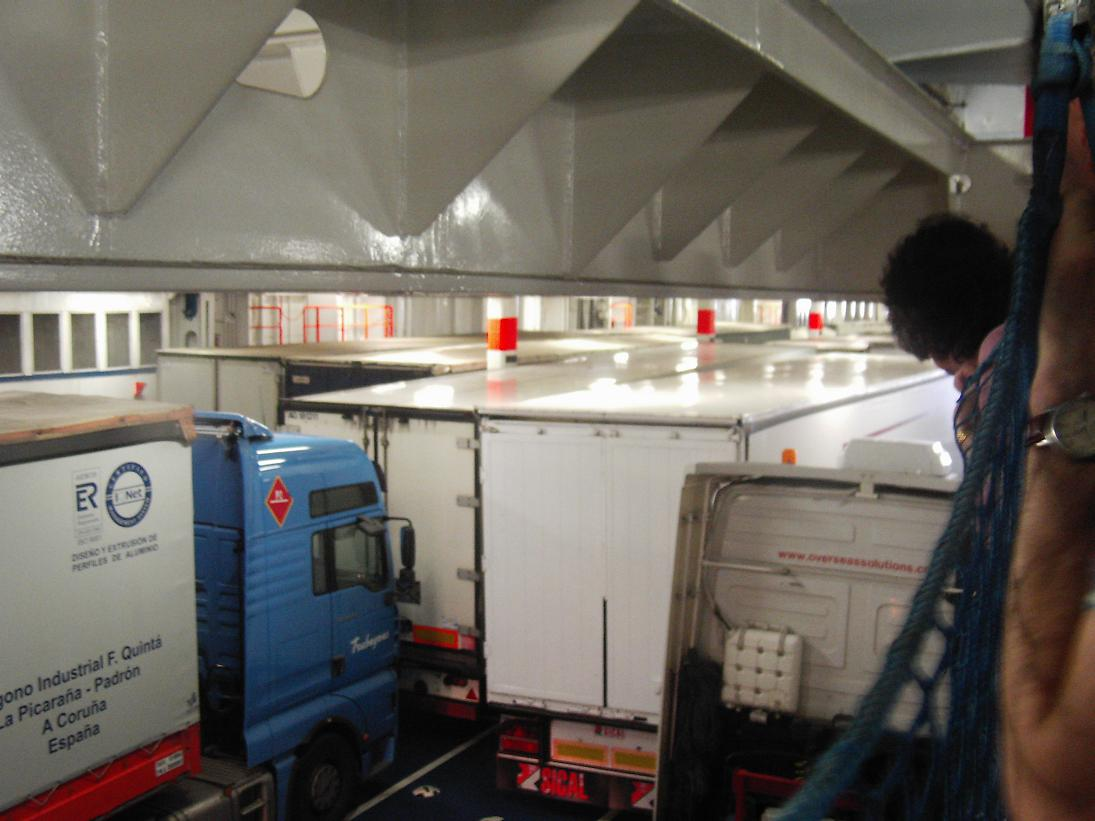
Lorries preparing to unload from the Pont-Aven, the Brittany Ferries flagship

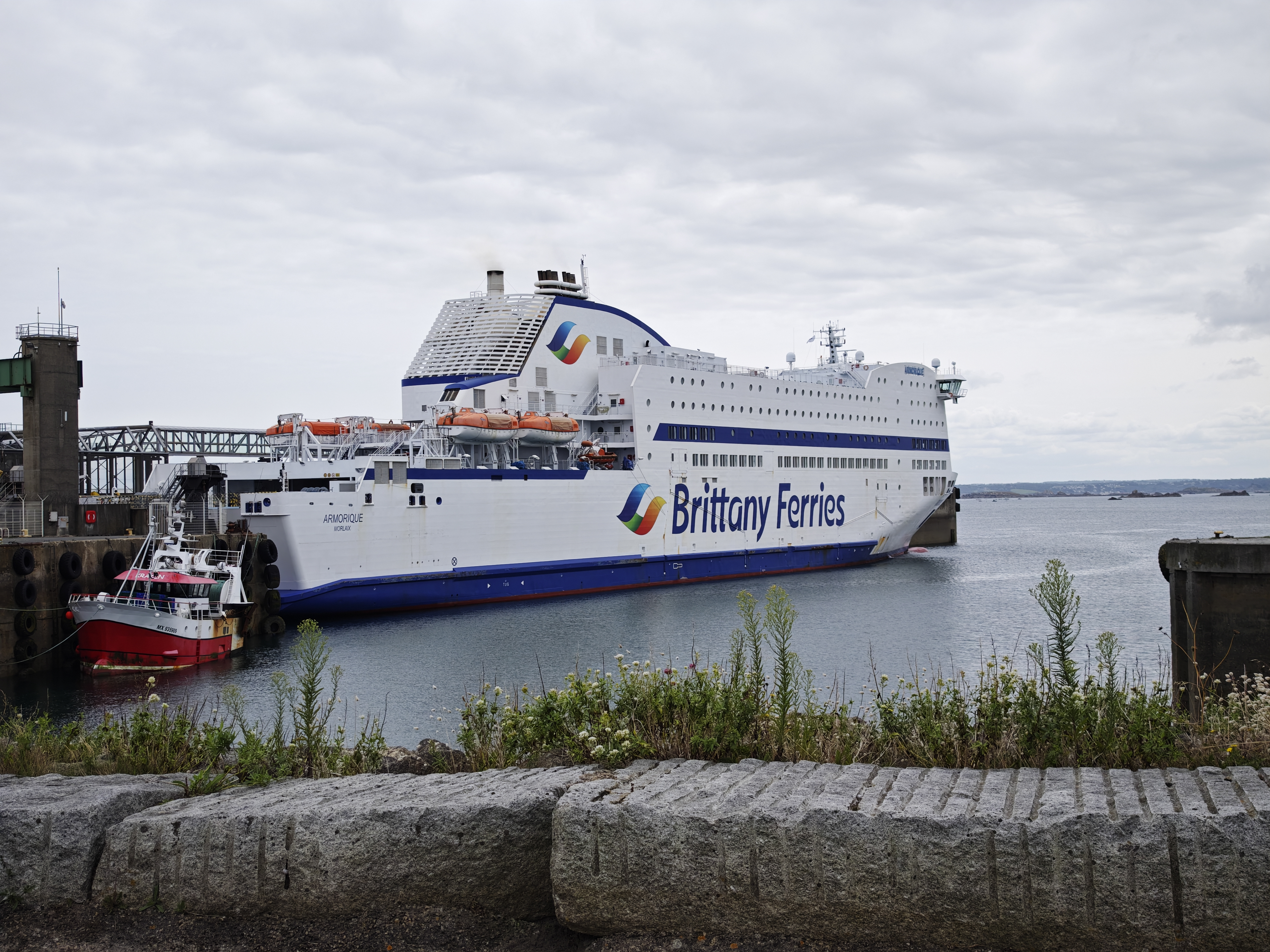
Brittany Ferries Armorique ferry

Roll-on/roll-off ferries (RORO) are large conventional ferries named for the ease by which vehicles can board and leave.

=== Cruiseferry / RoPax ===
A cruiseferry is a ship that combines the features of a cruise ship with a roll-on/roll-off ferry. They are also known as RoPax for their combined Roll on/Roll Off and passenger design.

=== Fast RoPax ferry ===
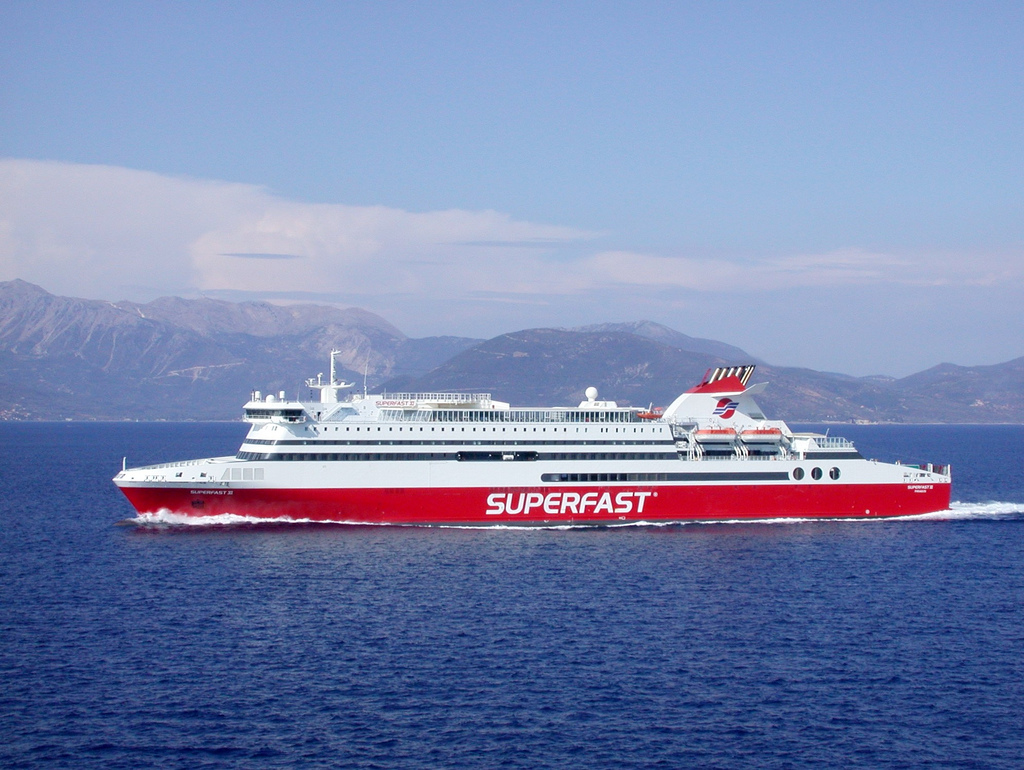
MS Superfast XI

Fast RoPax ferries are conventional ferries with a large garage intake and a relatively large passenger capacity, with conventional diesel propulsion and propellers that sail over 25 knots (46 km/h; 29 mph). Pioneering this class of ferries was Attica Group, when it introduced Superfast I between Greece and Italy in 1995 through its subsidiary company Superfast Ferries.

=== Turntable ferry ===
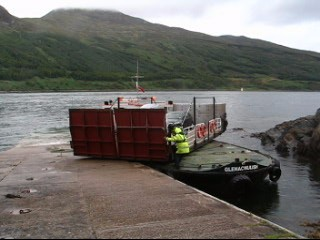
Turntable ferry MV Glenachulish operating between Glenelg on the Scottish mainland, and Kylerhea on the Isle of Skye. Built in 1969, she is the last manually operated turntable ferry in the world.

This type of ferry allows vehicles to load from the "side". The vehicle platform can be turned. When loading, the platform is turned sideways to allow sideways loading of vehicles. Then the platform is turned back, in line with the vessel, and the journey across water is made.

=== Pontoon ferry ===
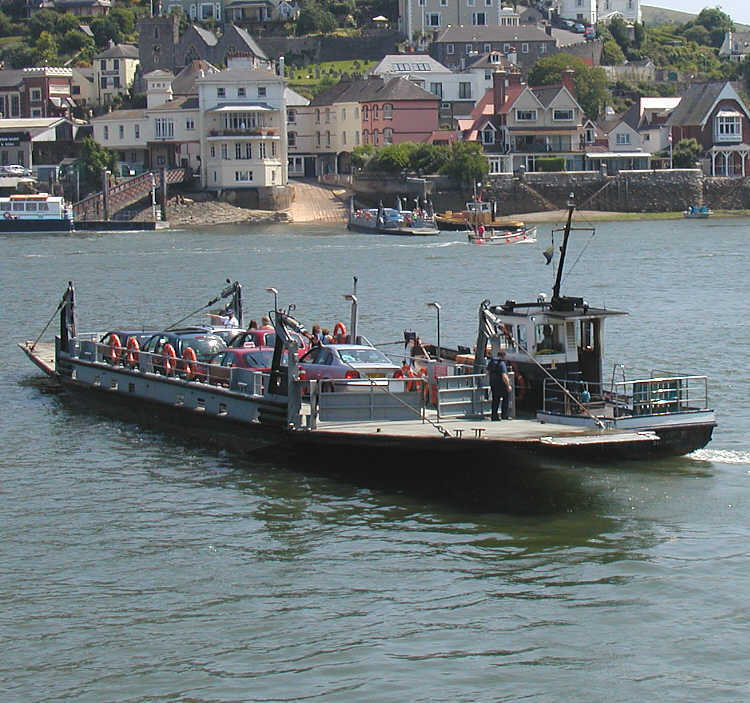
The Lower Kingswear to Dartmouth ferry, Devon, England. The pontoon carries eight cars and is towed across the River Dart by a small tug. Two ropes connect the tug to the pontoon.

Pontoon ferries and flat-bottomed boats such as punts carry passengers and vehicles across rivers and lakes and are widely used in less-developed countries with large rivers where the cost of bridge construction is prohibitive. One or more vehicles are carried on such ferries with ramps at either end for vehicles or animals to board. Cable ferries are usually pontoon ferries. In the Netherlands, Belgium and Germany many such small cable ferries exist and are called püntes.

=== Train ferry ===
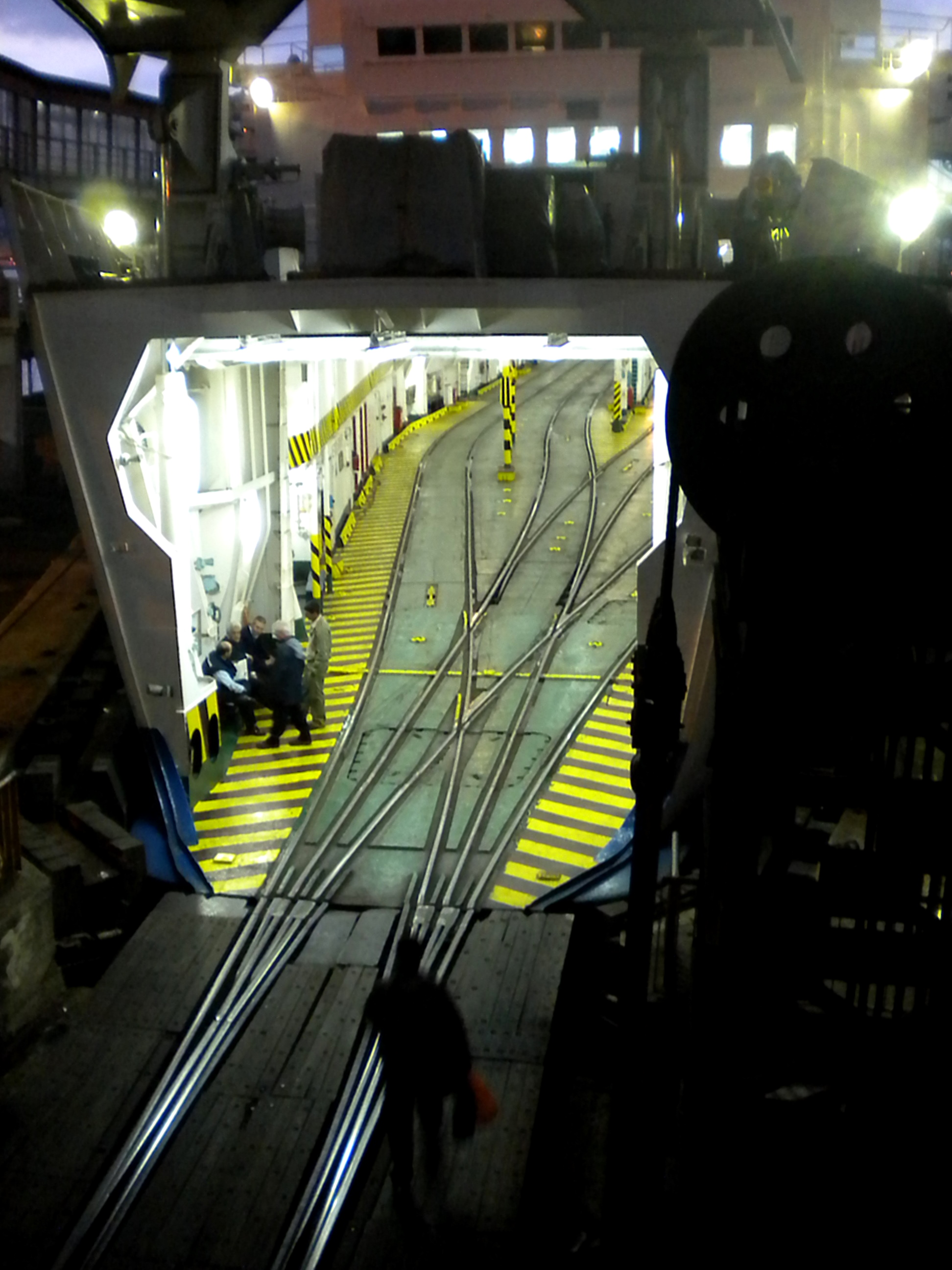
Train and car ferry between Calabria and Sicily, Italy

A train ferry is a ship designed to carry railway vehicles. Typically, one level of the ship is fitted with railway tracks, and the vessel has a door at either or both of the front and rear to give access to the wharves.

=== Foot ferry ===
Foot ferries are small craft used to ferry foot passengers, and often also cyclists, over rivers. These are either self-propelled craft or cable ferries. Such ferries are for example to be found on the lower River Scheldt in Belgium and in particular the Netherlands. Regular foot ferry service also exists in the capital of the Czech Republic, Prague, and across the Yarra River in Melbourne, Australia at Newport. Restored, expanded ferry service in the Port of New York and New Jersey uses boats for pedestrians only.

The UK has a variety of historic foot ferries such as the Butley Foot Ferry across Butley Creek which dates back to 1383.

=== Cable ferry ===
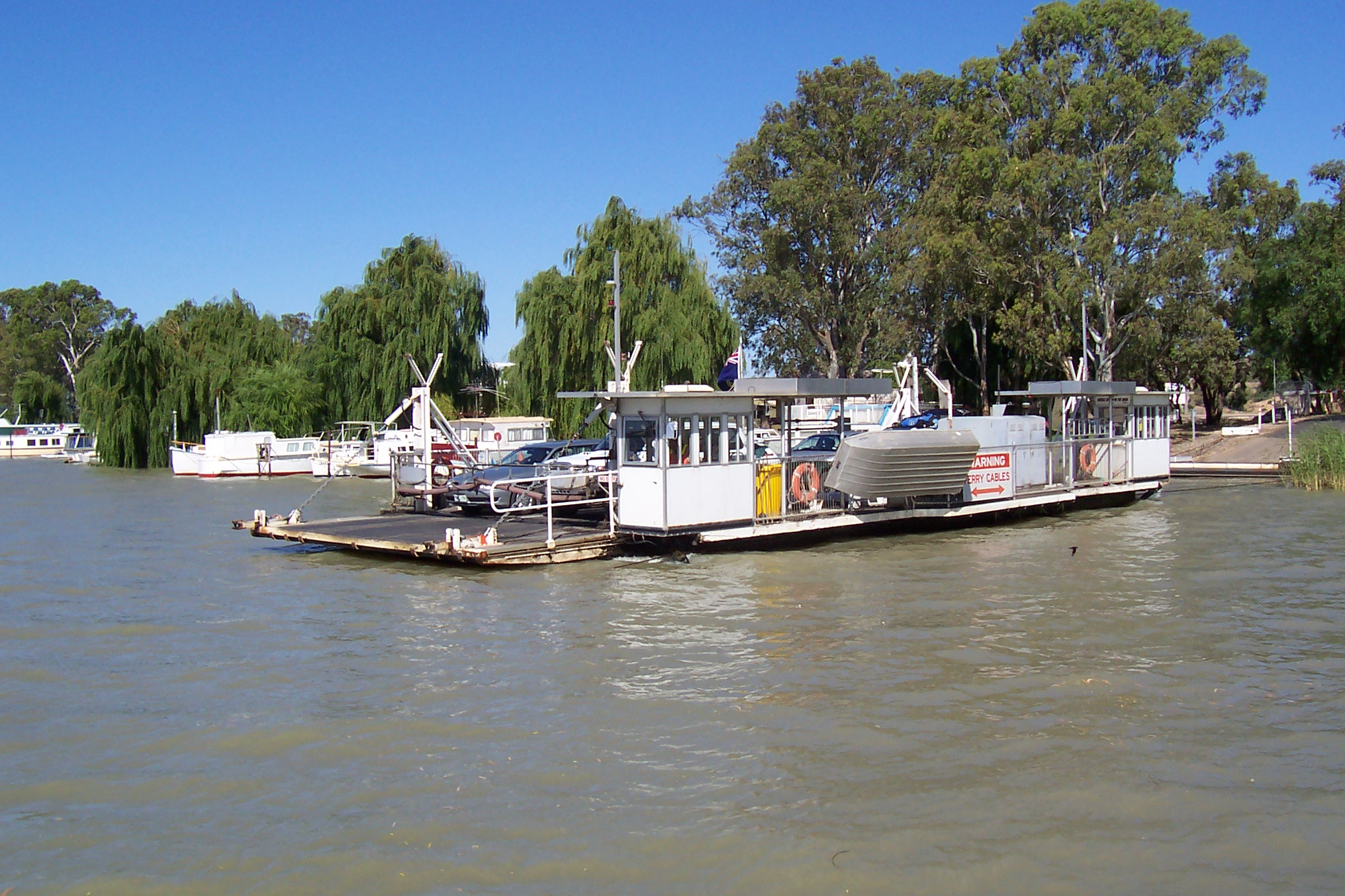
One of several self-propelled cable ferries that cross the lower reaches of the Murray River in South Australia

Very short distances may be crossed by a cable or chain ferry, which is usually a pontoon ferry (see above), where the ferry is propelled along and steered by cables connected to each shore. Sometimes the cable ferry is human powered by someone on the boat. Reaction ferries are cable ferries that use the perpendicular force of the current as a source of power. Examples of a current propelled ferry are the four Rhine ferries in Basel, Switzerland. Cable ferries may be used in fast-flowing rivers across short distances. With an ocean crossing of approximately 1900 metres, the cable ferry between Vancouver Island and Denman Island in British Columbia; is the longest one in the world.

Free ferries operate in some parts of the world, such as in Amsterdam, Netherlands (across the IJ waterway); along the Murray River in South Australia, and across many lakes in British Columbia. Many cable ferries operate on lakes and rivers in Canada, among them a cable ferry that charges a toll operates on the Rivière des Prairies between Laval-sur-le-Lac and Île Bizard in Quebec, Canada. In Finland there were 40 road ferries (cable ferries) in 2009, on lakes, rivers and on sea between islands.

== Air ferries ==
In the 1950s and 1960s, travel on an "air ferry" was possible—airplanes, often ex-military, specially equipped to take a small number of cars in addition to foot passengers. These operated various routes including between the United Kingdom and Continental Europe. Companies operating such services included Channel Air Bridge, Silver City Airways, and Corsair.

The term is also applied to any "ferrying" by air, and is commonly used when referring to airborne military operations.

== Docking ==
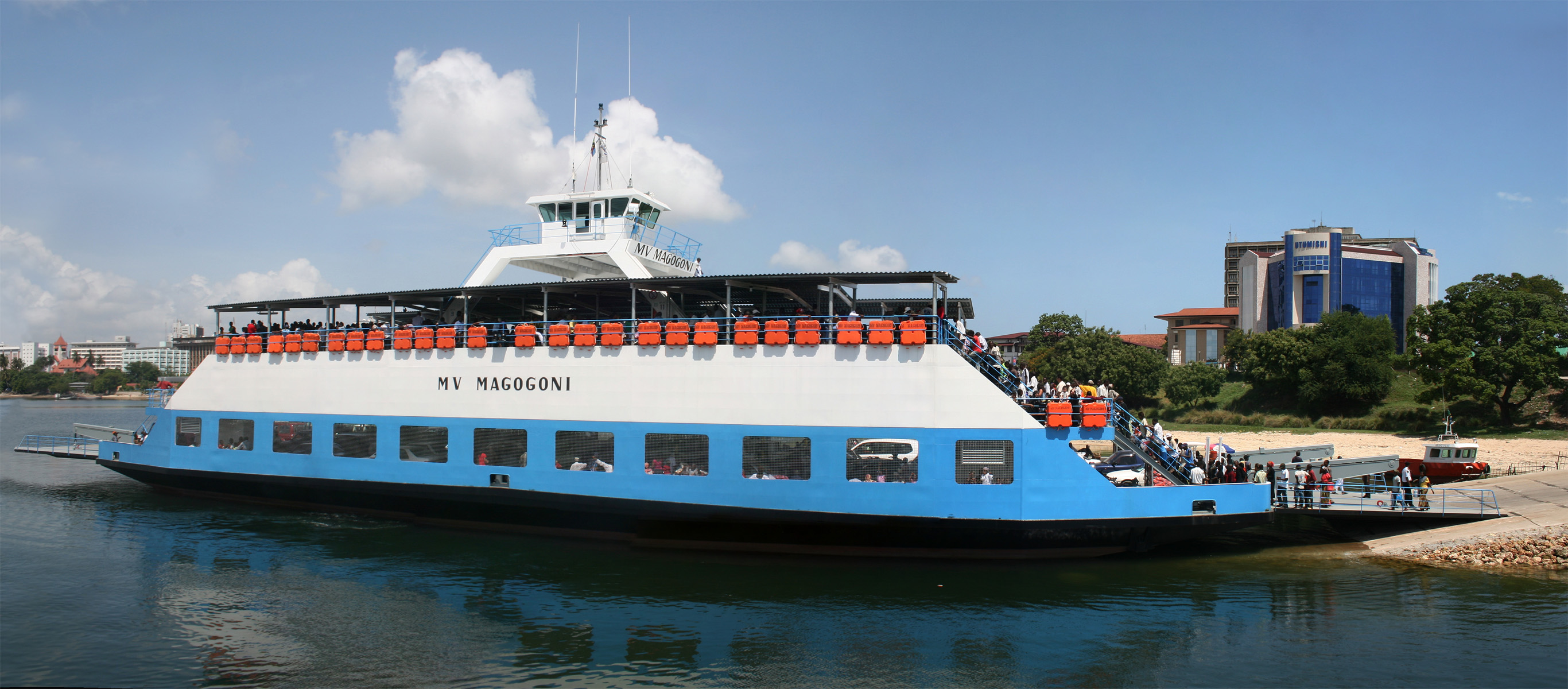
Drawbridge of the ferry lies on the ferry slip. This double sided ferry measures 74 m × 17.5 m (243 ft × 57 ft), and carries 2000 passengers with 60 cars

Ferries often dock at specialized facilities designed to position the boat for loading and unloading, called a ferry slip. If the ferry transports road vehicles or railway carriages there will usually be an adjustable ramp called an apron that is part of the slip. In other cases, the apron ramp will be a part of the ferry itself, acting as a wave guard when elevated and lowered to meet a fixed ramp at the terminus – a road segment that extends partially underwater or meet the ferry slip.

== Records ==
=== Gross tonnage ===
The world's largest ferries are typically those operated in Europe, with different vessels holding the record depending on whether length, gross tonnage or car vehicle capacity is the metric.

=== Oldest ===
The oldest ferry in continuous operation is the Mersey Ferry from Liverpool to Birkenhead, England. In 1150, the Benedictine Priory at Birkenhead was established. The monks used to charge a small fare to row passengers across the estuary. In 1330, Edward III granted a charter to the Priory and its successors for ever: "the right of ferry there... for men, horses and goods, with leave to charge reasonable tolls". However, there may have been a short break following the Dissolution of the monasteries after 1536.

On 11 October 1811, inventor John Stevens' ship the Juliana, began operation as the first steam-powered ferry (service was between New York City, and Hoboken, New Jersey).

The Elwell Ferry, a cable ferry in North Carolina, travels a distance of 110 yards (100 m), shore to shore, with a travel time of five minutes.

=== Largest networks ===
- Waxholmsbolaget – 21 vessels serving around 300 ports of call in the Stockholm archipelago.
- Istanbul Ferry Network – 87 vessels serving 86 ports of call in and around the Bosporus of Istanbul, Turkey.
- BC Ferries – 36 vessels serving 47 ports of call along the west coast of British Columbia, Canada, carrying 22.3 million passengers annually.
- Caledonian MacBrayne – 31 vessels serving 50 ports of call along the west coast of Scotland, carrying 1.43 million passengers annually.
- Sydney Ferries – 31 vessels serving 36 ports of call in Port Jackson (Sydney Harbour), carrying 15.3 million passengers annually.
- Washington State Ferries – 21 vessels serving 20 ports of call around Puget Sound of Washington, United States, carrying 20.1 million passengers annually.
- Metrolink Queensland – 21 vessels serving 26 ports of call along the Brisbane River in Brisbane, Australia, carrying 2.7 million passengers annually.
- Société des traversiers du Québec

=== Busiest networks ===
- Istanbul Ferry Network – 40 million passengers annually.
- Washington State Ferries – 20.1 million passengers and 9.4 million vehicles annually.
- Staten Island Ferry in New York City – 23.9 million passengers annually; busiest single-line ferry in the world.
- Amsterdam GVB Ferries – 22.4 million passengers annually.
- BC Ferries – 22.3 million passengers annually.
- Star Ferry in Hong Kong – 19.7 million passengers annually.

=== Fastest ===
The gas turbine powered Luciano Federico L operated by Montevideo-based Buquebus, holds the Guinness World Record for the fastest car ferry in the world, in service between Montevideo, Uruguay and Buenos Aires, Argentina: its maximum speed, achieved in sea trials, was 60.2 knots (111.5 km/h; 69.3 mph). It can carry 450 passengers and 52 cars along the 110-nautical-mile (200 km; 130 mi) route.

== Sustainability ==
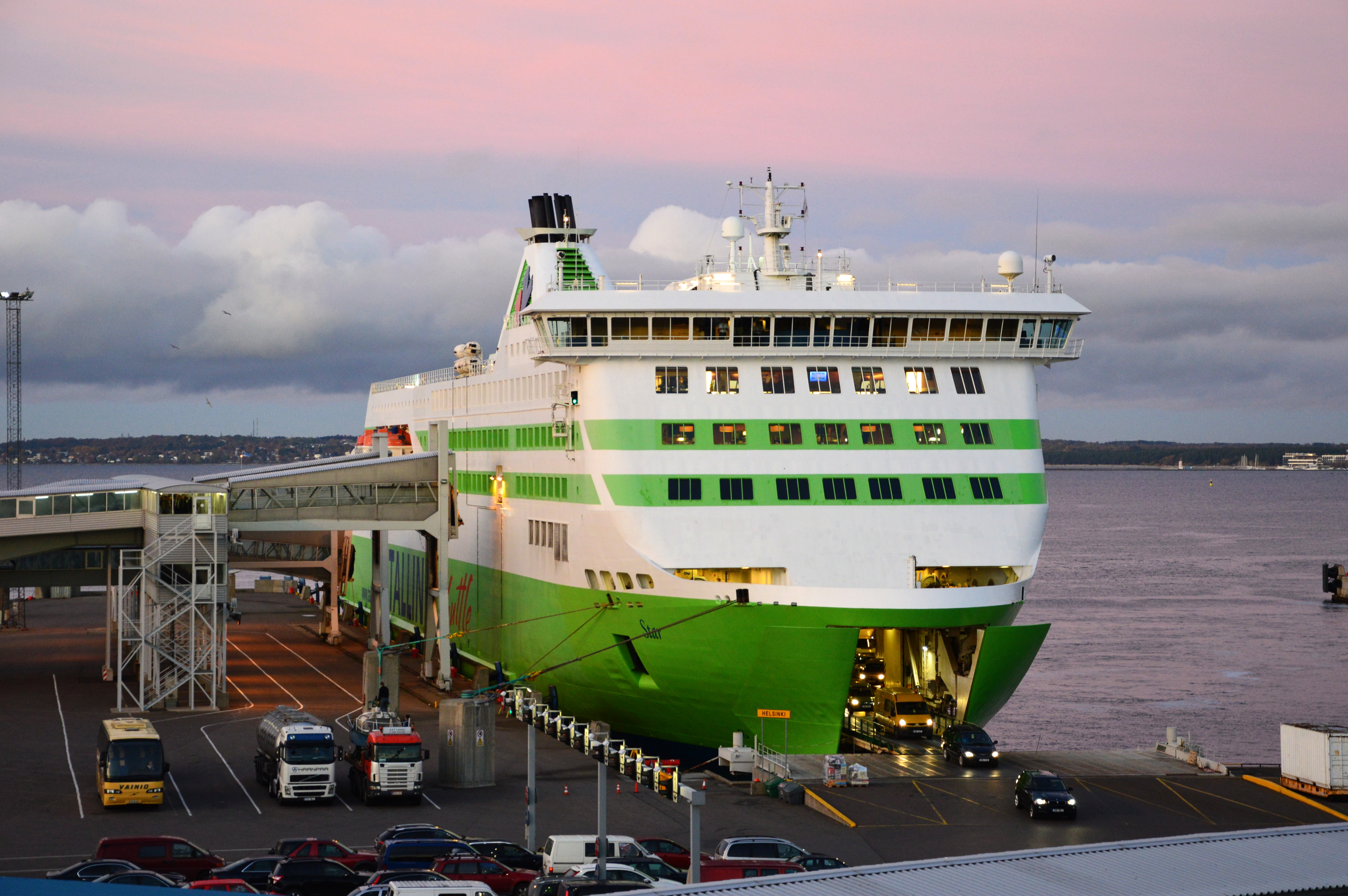
Fast Ro-Pax ferries, like MS Star, have notable CO_{2} emissions.

The contributions of ferry travel to climate change have received less scrutiny than land and air transport, and vary considerably according to factors like speed and the number of passengers carried. Average carbon dioxide emissions by ferries per passenger-kilometre seem to be 0.12 kg (4.2 oz). However, 18-knot (21 mph; 33 km/h) ferries between Finland and Sweden produce 0.221 kg (7.8 oz) of CO_{2}, with total emissions equalling a CO_{2} equivalent of 0.223 kg (7.9 oz), while 24–27-knot (28–31 mph; 44–50 km/h) ferries between Finland and Estonia produce 0.396 kg (14.0 oz) of CO_{2} with total emissions equalling a CO_{2} equivalent of 0.4 kg (14 oz).

=== Alternative fuels ===
With the price of oil at high levels, and with increasing pressure from consumers for measures to tackle global warming, a number of innovations for energy and the environment were put forward at the Interferry conference in Stockholm. According to the company Solar Sailor, hybrid marine power and solar wing technology are suitable for use with ferries, private yachts and even tankers.

Alternative fuels are becoming more widespread on ferries. The fastest passenger ferry in the world Buquebus, runs on LNG, while Sweden's Stena converted one of its ferries to run on both diesel and methanol in 2015. Both LNG and methanol reduce CO_{2} emissions considerably and replace costly diesel fuel.

Megawatt-class battery electric ferries operate in Scandinavia, with several more scheduled for operation. As of 2017, the world's biggest purely electric ferry was the MF Tycho Brahe, which operates on the Helsingør–Helsingborg ferry route across the Øresund between Denmark and Sweden. The ferry weights 8414 tonnes, and has an electric storage capacity of more than 4 MWh.

Since 2015, Norwegian ferry company Norled has operated e-ferry Ampere on the Lavik-Opedal connection on the E39 north of Bergen. Further north on the Norwegian west coast, the connection between Anda and Lote will be the world's first route served only by e-ferries. The first of two ships, MF Gloppefjord, was put into service in January 2018, followed by MF Eidsfjord. The owner, Fjord1, has commissioned a further seven battery-powered ferries to be in operation from 2020. A total of 60 battery powered car ferries are expected to be operational in Norway by 2021.

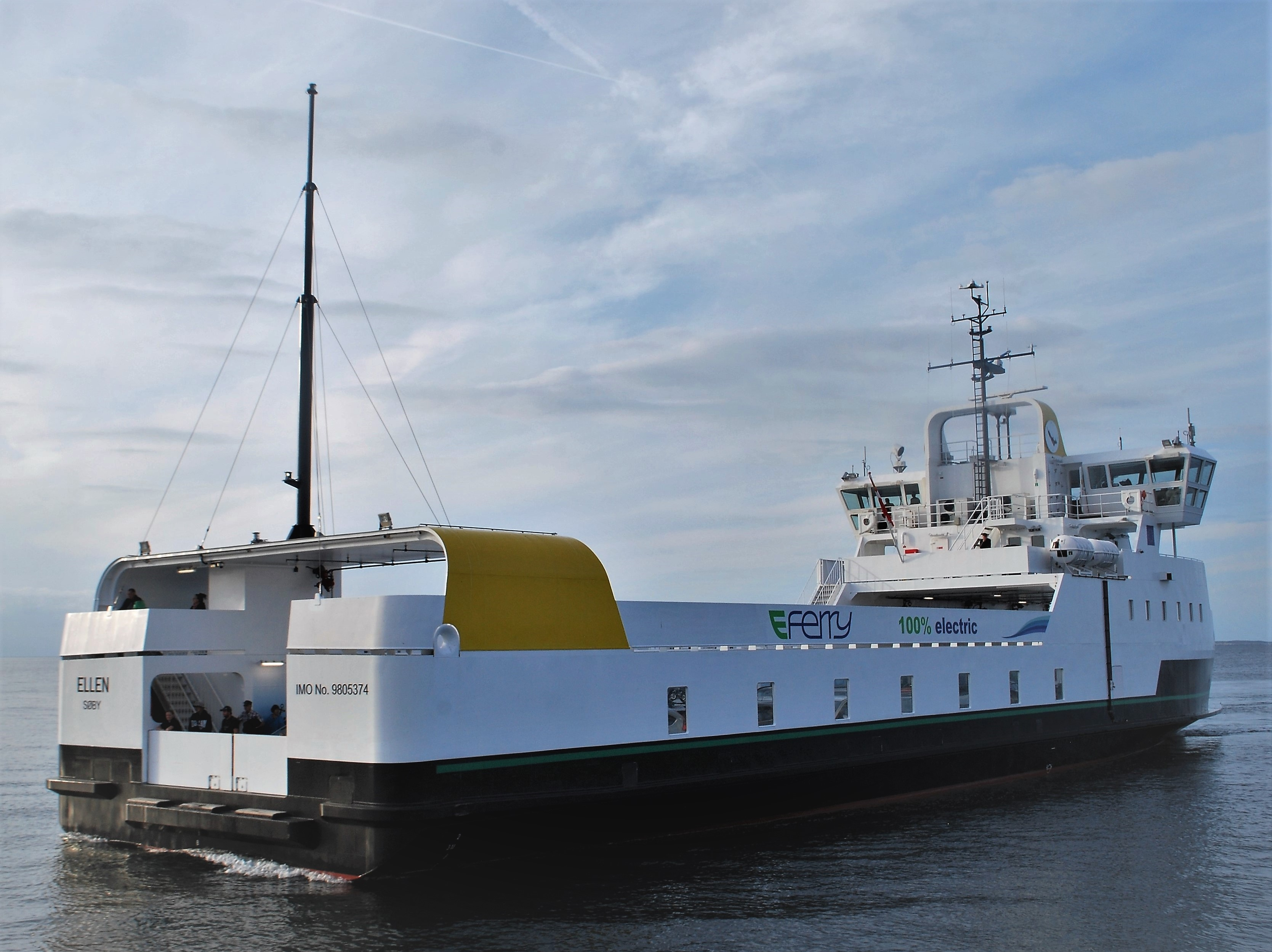
E-ferry Ellen

Since 15 August 2019, Ærø Municipality have operated E-ferry Ellen between the southern Danish ports of Fynshav and Søby, on the island of Ærø. The e-ferry is capable of carrying 30 vehicles and 200 passengers and is powered by a battery "with an unprecedented capacity" of 4.3 MWh (5,800 hp⋅h). The vessel can sail up to 22 nautical miles (25 mi; 41 km) between charges – seven times further than previously possible for an e-ferry. It will now need to prove it can provide up to seven return trips per day. The European Union, which supported the project, aims to roll out 100 or more of these ferries by 2030.

A special feature is the Danish Udbyhøj cable ferry in Randers Fjord which has a land-based power supply by means of a retractable submarine cable.

== Accidents ==
Examples of sunken ferries
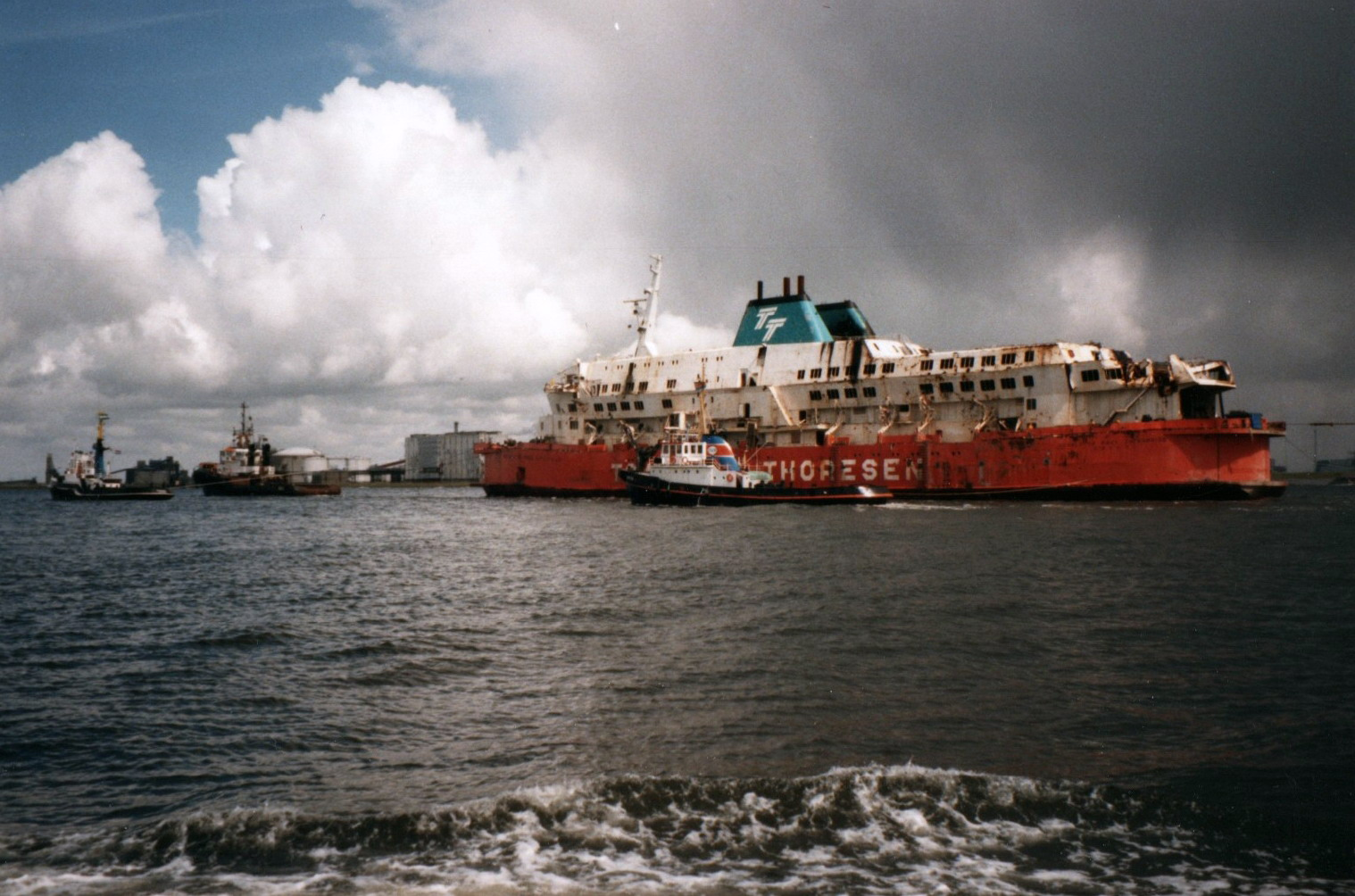
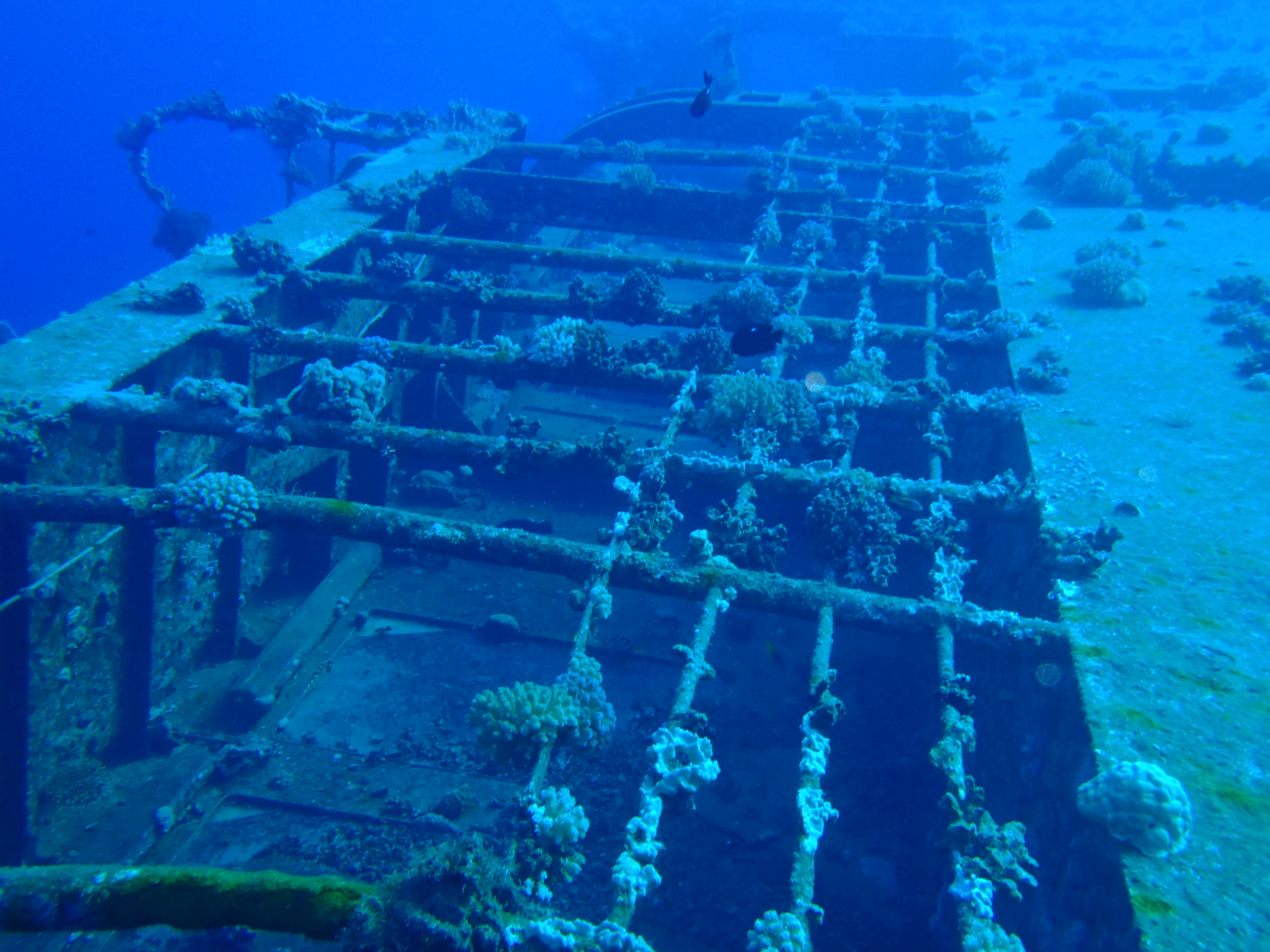
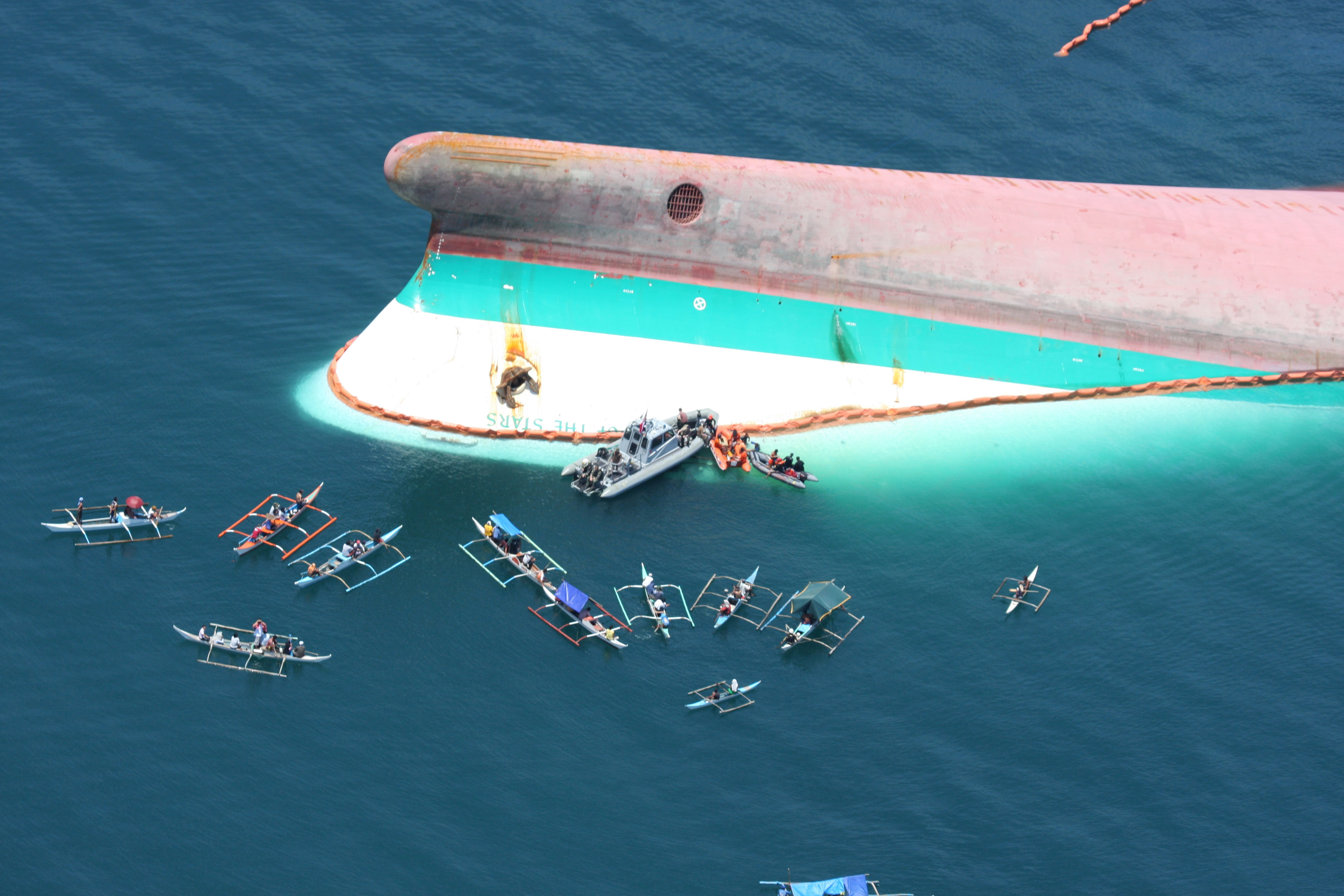
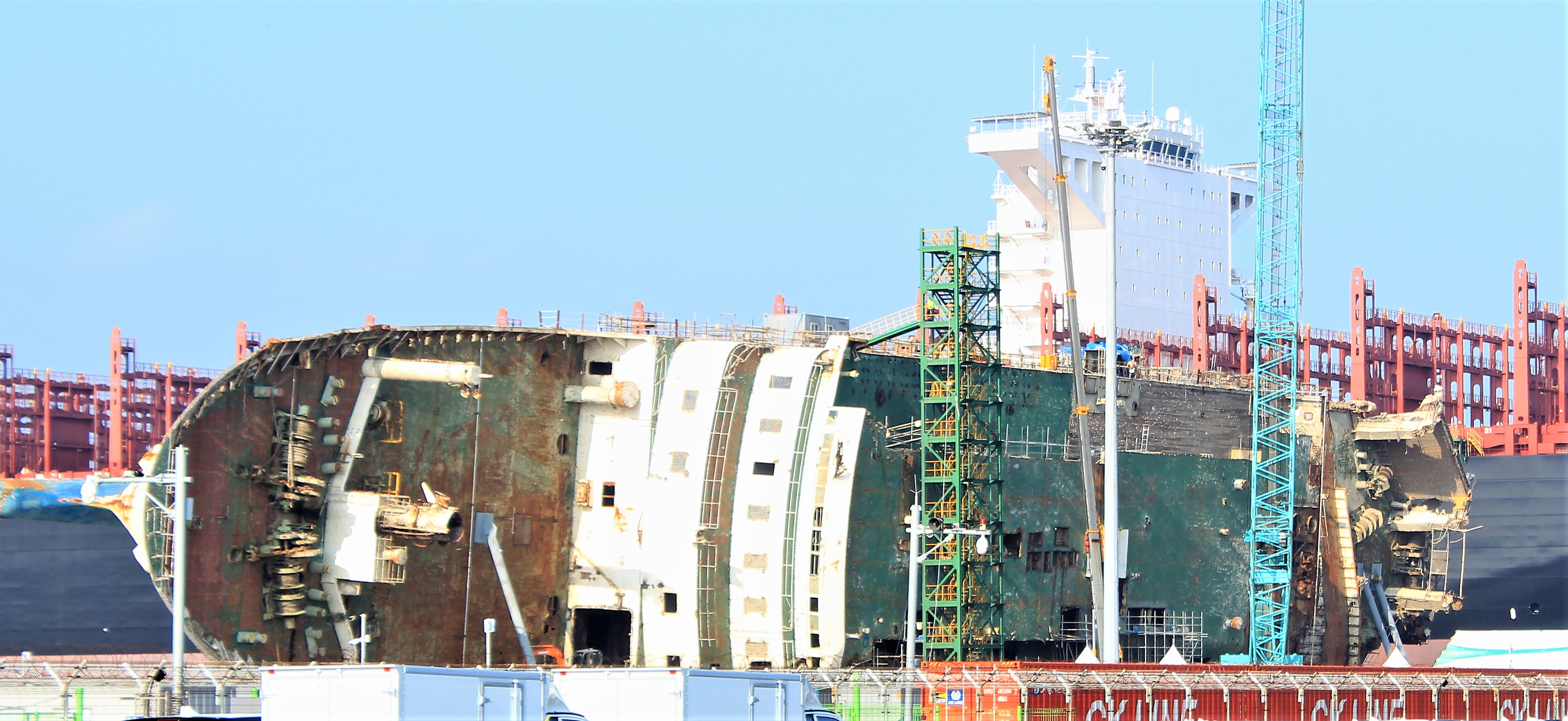
Images in order of appearance: Herald of Free Enterprise, Salem Express, MV Princess of the Stars and MV Sewol

The following notable maritime disasters involved ferries:

- TEV Wahine – (10 April 1968) 53 deaths
- MV Namyoug-Ho (15 December 1970) 323–326 deaths
- MV George Prince (20 October 1976) 78 deaths
- Herald of Free Enterprise – (6 March 1987) 193 deaths
- Doña Paz – (20 December 1987) 4,386 deaths
- Doña Marilyn – (24 October 1988) ≈400 deaths
- Scandinavian Star – (7 April 1990) 159 deaths
- Salem Express – (15 December 1991) 470–850 deaths
- MS Empress of Australia – (23 August 1992) 30 deaths
- MS Jan Heweliusz – (14 January 1993) 55 deaths
- MV Seohae – (10 October 1993) 292 deaths
- MS Estonia – (28 September 1994) 852 deaths
- MV Cebu City – (2 December 1994) 140 deaths
- MV Bukoba – (21 May 1996) 894 deaths
- Princess of the Orient – (18 September 1998) 150 deaths
- Express Samina – (26 September 2000) 81 deaths
- Le Joola – (26 September 2002) 1,863 deaths
- MV Princess of the Stars – (21 June 2008) 814 deaths
- Spice Islander I – (10 September 2011) 1,573 deaths
- Rabaul Queen – (2 February 2012) 88–223 deaths
- MV Skagit – (18 July 2012) 150 deaths
- MV St. Thomas Aquinas – (16 August 2013) 137 deaths
- MV Sewol – (16 April 2014) 304 deaths
- MV Nyerere – (20 September 2018) 228 deaths

== See also ==
- Chain boat
- Ferry slip
- Linkspan
- List of ferry operators
- Punt (boat)
- Pünte
- Sea tractor
- Team boat
- Transporter bridge
- Merchant Vessel
