= MV Wickersham =

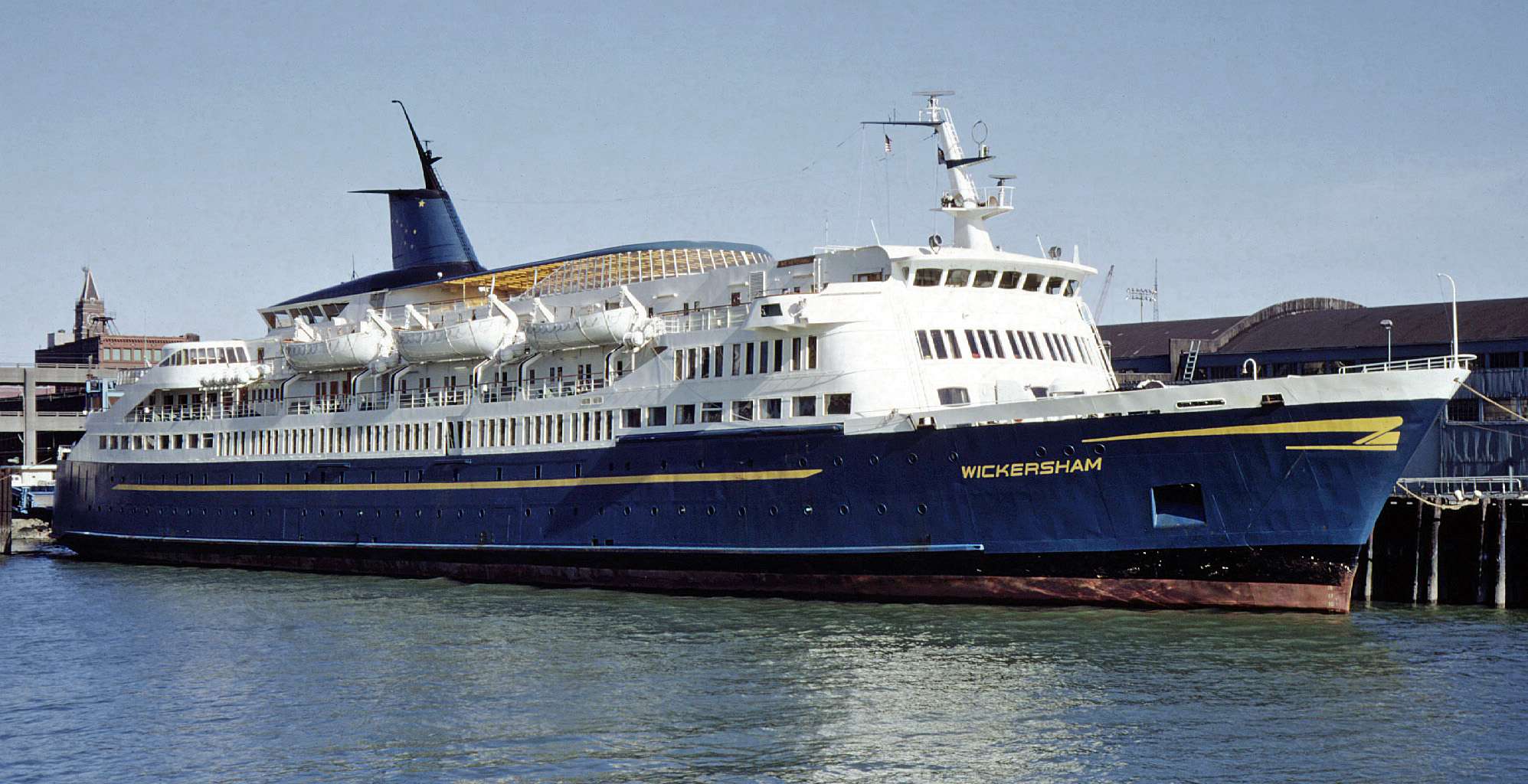
- Wickersham at the Seattle in 1974

History

Sweden
- Name: Stena Britannica
- Owner: Stena Line
- Route: Kiel-Gothenburg
- Builder: A/S Langesunds Mek
- Launched: 1967
- Fate: Sold to Alaska Marine Highway

United States
- Name: Wickersham
- Namesake: James Wickersham
- Owner: Alaska Marine Highway System
- Port of registry: United States
- Route: Seattle (WA), Prince Rupert (BC), Haines, Juneau, Ketchikan, Sitka
- Acquired: by purchase, April 1968
- Commissioned: 1968
- Decommissioned: 1974
- Identification: IMO number: 6717148
- Fate: Sold to Sally Line

Finland
- Name: Viking 6
- Owner: Sally Line
- Operator: Viking Line
- Route: Stockholm-Helsinki
- In service: 1974
- Out of service: 1980

France
- Name: Goelo
- Owner: Sally Line
- Operator: Brittany Ferries
- Route: Portsmouth-St Malo
- Commissioned: 1980
- Decommissioned: 1982
- Fate: Sold to Sol Lines

Cyprus
- Name: Sol Olympia
- Owner: Sol Lines
- Operator: Sol Lines
- Route: Venice-Haifa
- Commissioned: 1982
- Decommissioned: 1985
- Fate: Reverted to AB Sally after Sol Lines bankruptcy

Finland
- Name: Sun Express
- Owner: Sally Line
- Operator: Viking Line
- In service: 1985
- Out of service: 1986
- Renamed: Viking 6

Italy
- Name: Moby Dream
- Owner: Moby Lines
- In service: 1986
- Out of service: 1994

Italy
- Name: Sardegna Bella
- Owner: Moby Lines
- Operator: Sardegna Lines
- In service: 1994
- Fate: Scrapped in 2001

General characteristics
- Length: 363 ft (111 m)
- Decks: One vehicle deck
- Ramps: Bow
- Ice class: 1B
- Capacity: 1,300 passengers

MV Wickersham was a mainline ferry vessel for the Alaska Marine Highway. Wickersham was the second vessel, after the MV Chilkat, in the Alaska Marine Highway fleet to not have been constructed specifically for AMHS, but was rather acquired for from the Stena Line, where it was known as the Stena Britannica and served the Kiel, Germany–Gothenburg, Sweden route. Constructed just one year prior to its purchase by AMHS in April 1968, her arrival and status as an "oceangoing" vessel allowed AMHS to expand the southern terminus of its route system south to Washington and the Port of Seattle.

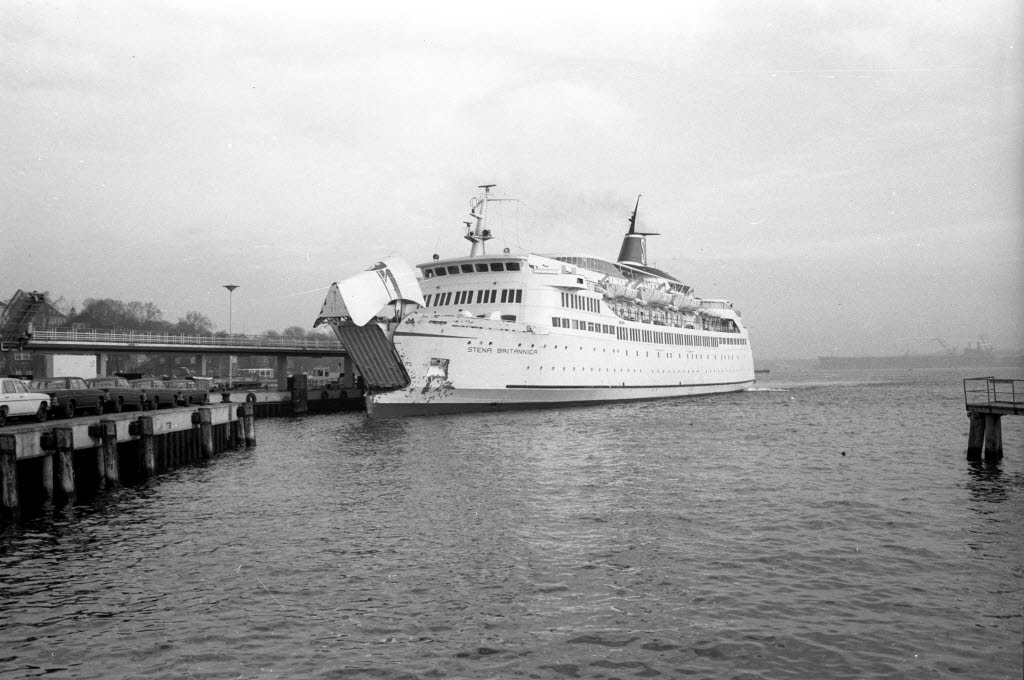
Stenna Britannica

Due to the Passenger Services Act and laws of cabotage, however, the Wickersham could only undergo its Washington-Alaska voyages with an intermediate stop in Prince Rupert, British Columbia. Further complicating her service was her complicated bow unloading system which was only compatible with AMHS ports in Haines, Juneau, Ketchikan, and Sitka, in addition to the ports of Seattle and Prince Rupert. Her large size and draft which served her well in the turbulent waters of Dixon Entrance and other exposed portions of the Alaska-Washington voyage, were too great to slip through passages of water such as Peril Strait en route to Sitka, which forced her to approach Sitka from the outer coast of Baranof Island and through the Pacific Ocean.

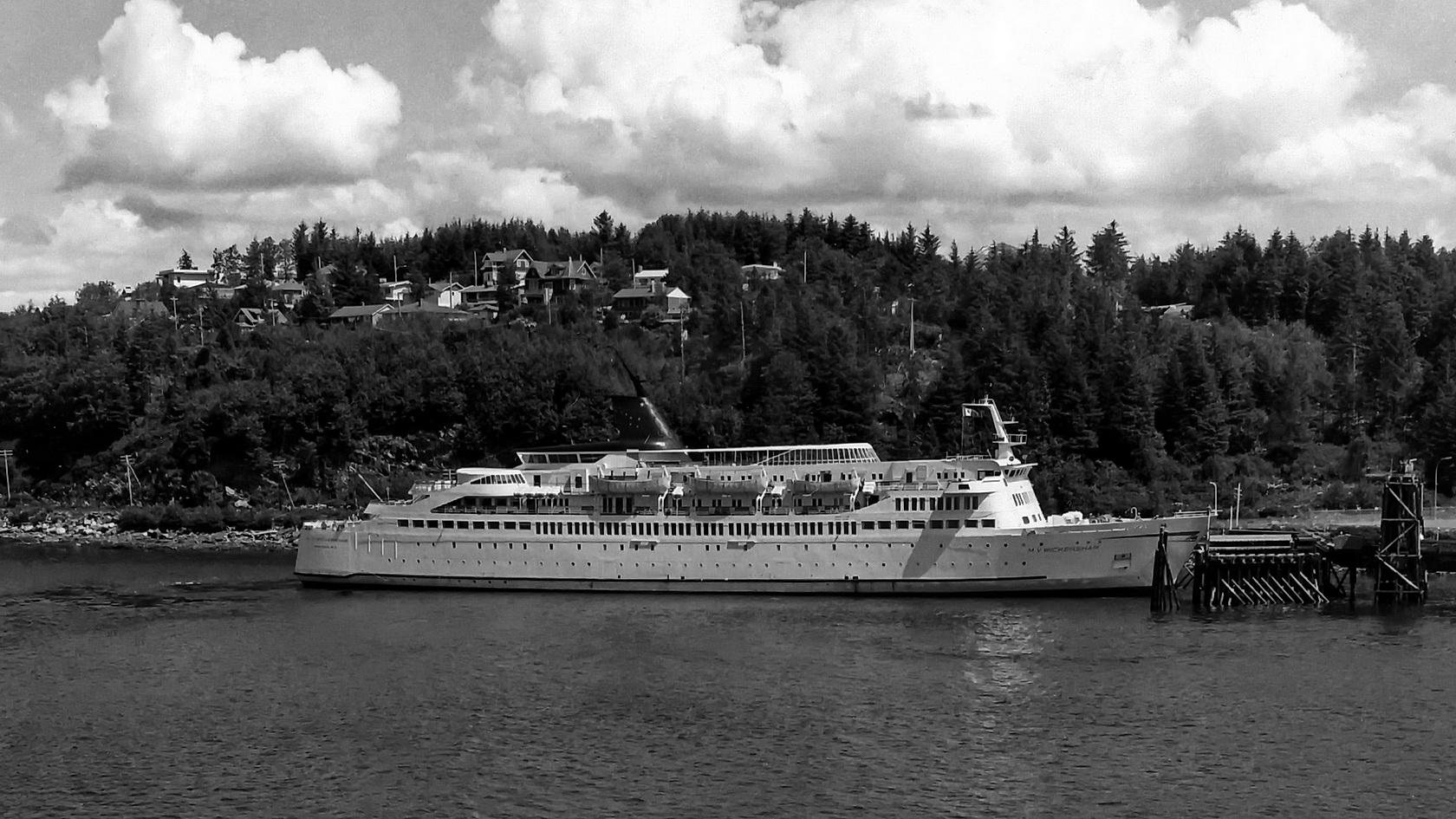
Wickersham at the Prince Rupert terminal in 1970

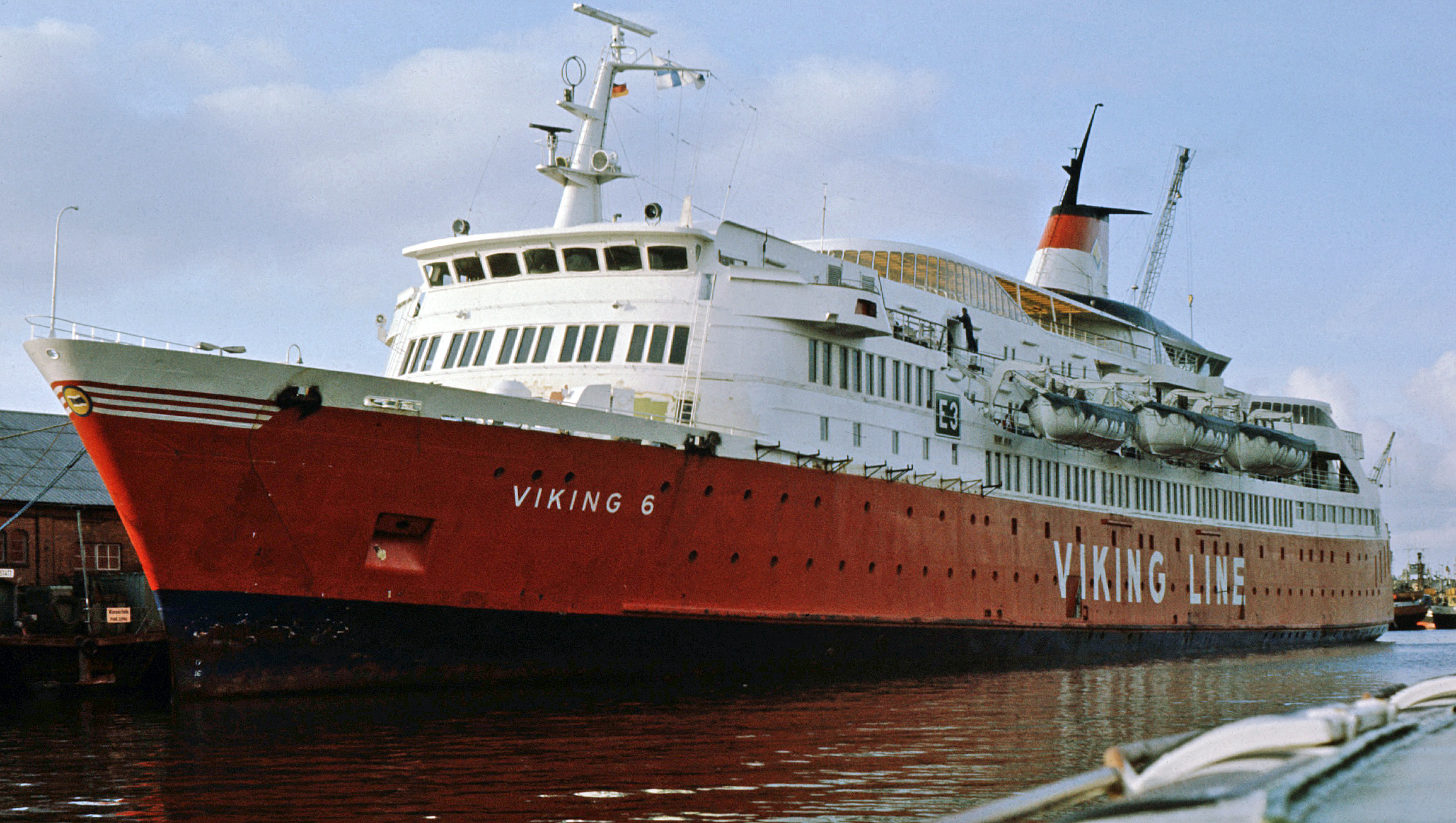
Viking 6 at Emden in April 1975

With the debut of the Columbia, the marine highway's new flagship vessel, in 1974, the Wickersham was sold to the Finland-based Rederi Ab Sally as the Viking 6, where she sailed from Stockholm to Helsinki under the Viking Line brand.
