= Cozian Reef =

Coordinates: 57°33′59″N 135°26′02″W

Cozian Reef or Nikolas Rock is located just above the northern tip of Baranof Island in Peril Strait which is in the Panhandle of the U.S. state of Alaska.

Cozian Reef is a prime maritime navigational hazard demonstrated by its alternative name, Nikolas Rock, which it received from sinking the Russian steamer Nikolas in 1854. More recently, Cozian Reef grounded the Alaska Marine Highway vessel M/V LeConte on May 10, 2004, which was only saved after an extensive salvage operation.

Cozian Reef was named by the U.S. Navy after Anton George Cozian, a navigator with the Russian American Company.
