= Aurora Glacier =

Aurora Glacier may refer to:

- Aurora Glacier (Alaska)
- Aurora Glacier (Antarctica)
