= MV Hubbard =

Alaska Marine Highway ferry

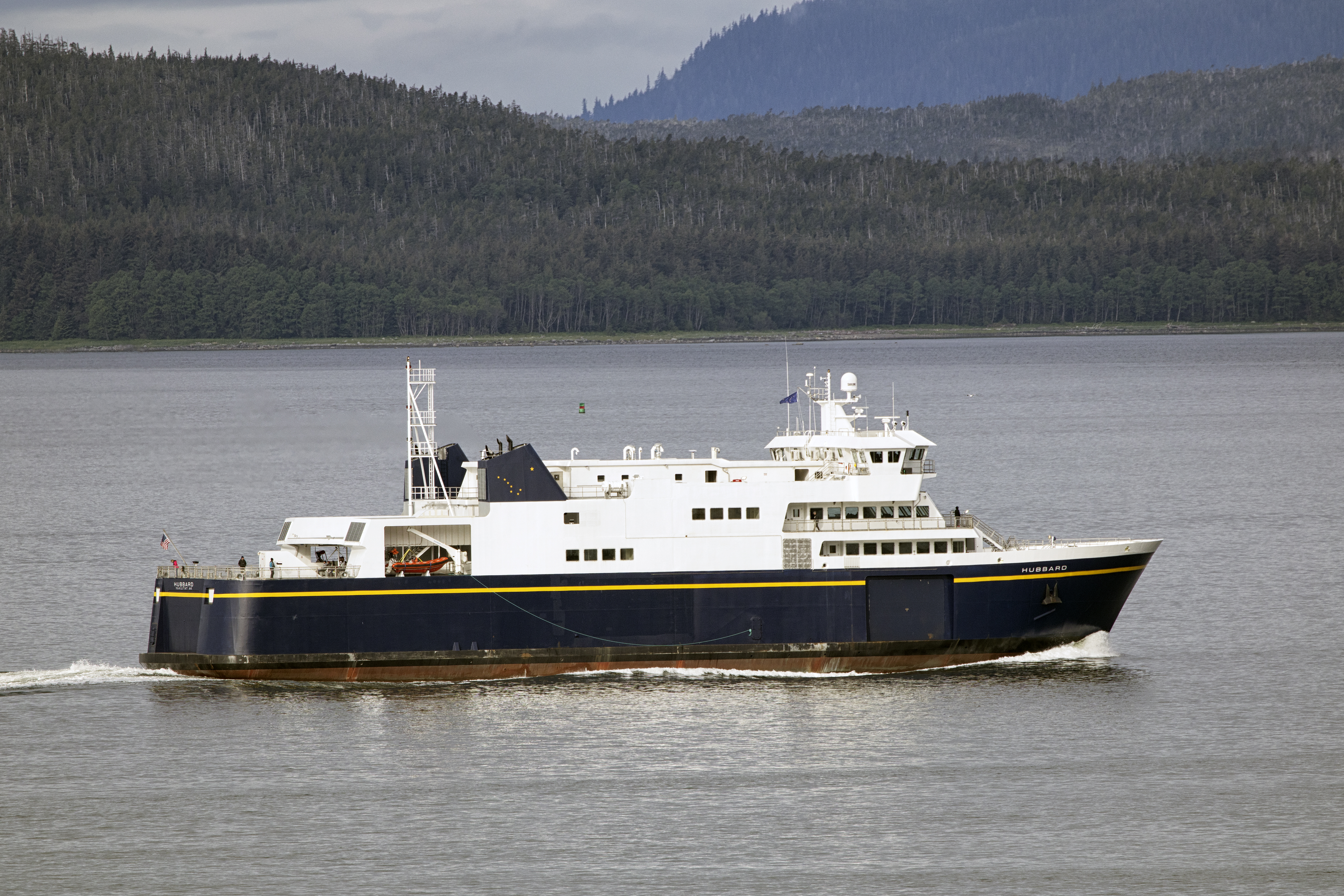
- MV Hubbard in 2023

History

United States
- Name: Hubbard
- Namesake: Hubbard Glacier
- Operator: Alaska Marine Highway System
- Port of registry: Valdez, Alaska
- Builder: Vigor Alaska
- Laid down: December 13, 2014
- Christened: June 26, 2023
- Maiden voyage: May 23, 2023
- Identification: IMO number: 9812808; MMSI number: 368067220; Callsign: WDK5676

General characteristics
- Tonnage: 5,304 GT
- Displacement: 3,016 long tons (3,064 t)
- Length: 280 ft (85 m)
- Beam: 67 ft (20 m)
- Draft: 13 ft 6 in (4.11 m)
- Decks: One vehicle deck; Two passenger decks
- Ramps: Bow, port, and aft ro-ro loading
- Installed power: 2 diesel engines
- Propulsion: 2 propellers
- Speed: 16.5 knots (30.6 km/h; 19.0 mph)
- Capacity: 280 passengers; 53 vehicles

MV Hubbard is an Alaska-class passenger and vehicle ferry operated by the Alaska Marine Highway System. She entered service in 2023 to operate on daytime routes in Southeast Alaska and is assigned to the Juneau–Haines–Skagway route.

Hubbard was part of a 2006 order to create vessels specifically for routes that operate on shorter routes without the need for staterooms. Her sister ship is MV Tazlina, which launched in 2019; each was originally budgeted to cost $60 million. She was named for Hubbard Glacier and was initially completed at Vigor Industrial's Ketchikan facility in 2018. The vessel's commissioning was delayed to add crew quarters as part of updated requirements for longer trips.

The ferry has a capacity of 280 passengers and 53 vehicles. She has a 14-member crew for most trips. Hubbard has a vehicle deck and two passenger decks with a cafeteria, solarium, observation lounge, and other spaces.
