= Kennicott =

Kennicott or Kennecott may refer to:

- Kennecott, Alaska, an abandoned mining camp, United States
- Benjamin Kennicott (1718-1783), English churchman and Hebrew scholar
  - Kennicott Bible, an illuminated Hebrew Bible manuscript named after Benjamin Kennicott
- Robert Kennicott (1835-1866), American naturalist and pioneer Alaska explorer
- Kennecott Utah Copper, operators of a large open pit copper mine, United States
  - Kennecott Utah Copper rail line
- Kennecott Land, a land development company based in Murray, Utah, United States
- MV Kennicott, an Alaska state ferry, United States
- Philip Kennicott, art and architecture critic for The Washington Post

== See also ==
- Robert Kennicutt (born 1951), American astronomer
