= MV Aurora (1977) =

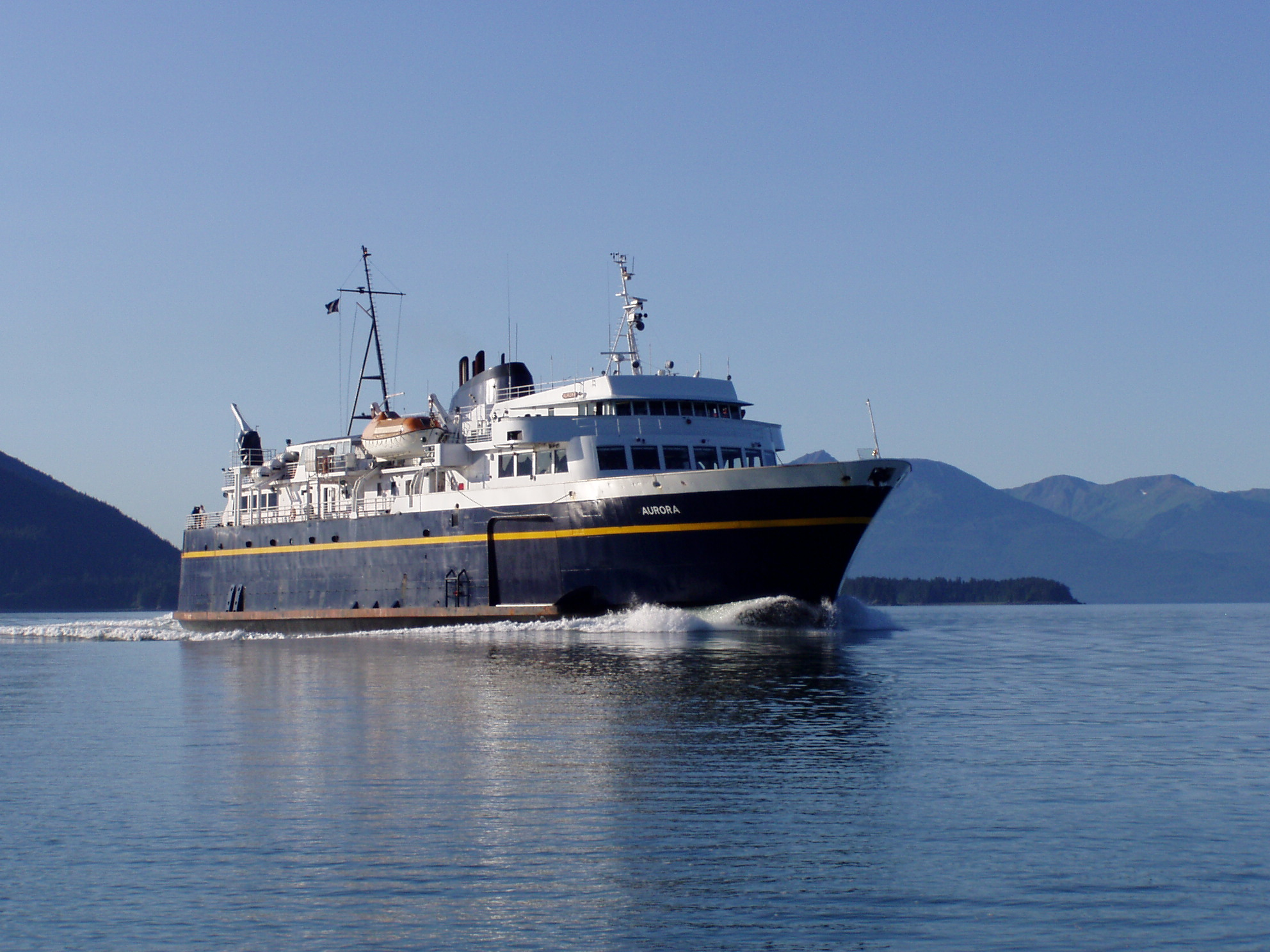

History
- Name: MV Aurora
- Namesake: Aurora Glacier
- Owner: Alaska Marine Highway System
- Port of registry: United States
- Builder: Peterson Shipbuilders, Sturgeon Bay, Wisconsin
- Launched: 1977
- Commissioned: 1977
- Homeport: Hoonah, Alaska
- Identification: IMO number: 7502332; MMSI number: 338205000; Callsign: WYM9567
- Status: in active service

General characteristics
- Displacement: 2,132 long tons (2,166 t)
- Length: 235 ft (72 m)
- Beam: 57 ft (17 m)
- Draft: 13 ft 11 in (4.24 m)
- Ramps: Aft, port, and starboard ro-ro loading
- Installed power: 4,300 hp (3,207 kW)
- Speed: 14.5 knots (26.9 km/h; 16.7 mph)
- Capacity: 250 passengers; 34 automobiles

MV Aurora is a feeder vessel for the Alaska Marine Highway System, built in Sturgeon Bay, Wisconsin in 1977 by Peterson Shipbuilders and commissioned by the Alaska Marine Highway System the same year.

The Aurora is the younger sister ship to the MV LeConte and both serve or have served as feeder vessels that pick up passengers in small communities such as Pelican and Hoonah and take them to larger regional communities (this process is colloquially known as the "milk run").

However, unlike the LeConte, the Aurora was moved out of Southeast Alaska into Prince William Sound area in 2005 to take the place of the retired MV Bartlett. This move, however, was highly controversial as the MV Chenega, a fast ferry, was supposed to take this role and been promised for years in advance to the Prince William Sound area and specifically to be homeported in the city of Cordova. Instead, the ferry system reneged on this promise and moved the Chenega to a Ketchikan-Wrangell route.

Currently, the Aurora is being hubbed out of Cordova (although, unlike the fast ferry, the Aurora operates 24-hours a day so it doesn't have a crew that lives in its homeport thus denying that city the economic stimulus of additional residents/jobs. This is the primary motive for the especially rancorous uproar from Cordova regarding the Chenega's route placement) and operating principally between Cordova, Whittier, and Valdez with whistle stops (the ferry only stops if there are prior reservations) in Tatitlek and Chenega Bay.

The Aurora's amenities include a hot-food cafeteria, movie and forward observation lounges, and solarium. There are no cabins on the Aurora both because of its small size and the lack of demand due to its feeder route running times.

The Aurora and the MV LeConte are the only AMHS vessels able to serve the communities of Angoon, Kake, Pelican, Tenakee Springs and Hoonah. This quality is due because of these vessels' small sizes thus making them both vital assets for the ferry system and the residents of these rural villages although currently the Aurora is not being utilized for this unique capacity.
