= MV Matanuska =

Ferry operated by the Alaska Marine Highway

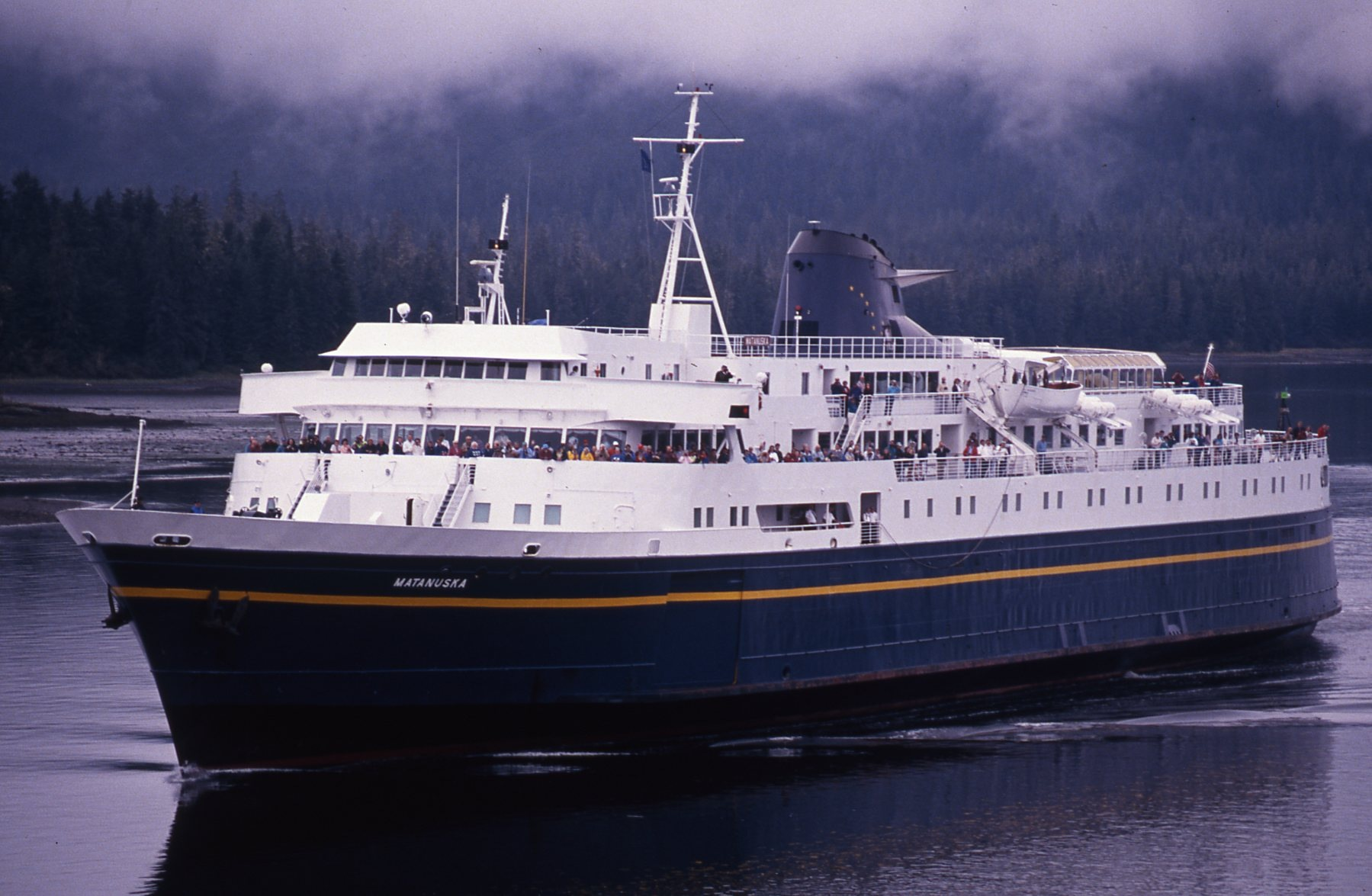
- MV Matanuska

History

United States
- Name: Matanuska
- Namesake: Matanuska Glacier, Chugach Mountains
- Operator: Alaska Marine Highway System
- Port of registry: Haines, Alaska
- Builder: Puget Sound Bridge & Dry Dock
- Laid down: July 6, 1962
- Launched: December 5, 1962
- Refit: Lengthened in 1978
- Identification: IMO number: 5228827; MMSI number: 338195000; Callsign: WN4201; Official Number: 291533
- Status: in active service

General characteristics
- Class & type: Malaspina-class mainline ferry
- Tonnage: 9,214 gross
- Displacement: 5,569 long tons (5,658 t)
- Length: 408 ft (124 m)
- Beam: 74 ft (23 m)
- Draft: 16 ft 11.63 in (5.1722 m)
- Decks: One vehicle deck; Three passenger decks
- Ramps: Aft, port, and starboard ro-ro loading
- Installed power: 2 x EMD 16-710 G7C-T3 Diesel engines
- Propulsion: 2 x 4-bladed variable-pitch propellers
- Speed: 16.5 knots (30.6 km/h; 19.0 mph)
- Capacity: 499 passengers; 88 vehicles
- Crew: 48

MV Matanuska, colloquially known as the Mat, is a mainline Malaspina-class ferry vessel operated by the Alaska Marine Highway System in Alaska, United States.

== Construction and characteristics ==
In 1959, as Alaska became a U.S. state, one of the top priorities of its coastal residents was improved ferry service. As early as February 1960, bills were introduced in the new state legislature to create a ferry authority. Alaska voters approved a $23 million bond issue in November 1960 to fund a state ferry system. Seattle naval architect Philip F. Spaulding was consulted by Governor William A. Egan as to what types of ships should be built and in May 1961, his firm was hired to design the first ships built for the new state system, Matanuska and her sister ships MV Malaspina, and MV Taku.

Puget Sound Bridge and Dry Dock Company of Seattle won the contract to build the three ships with a low bid of $10,445,000. Matanuska's keel was laid on July 6, 1962, in the same graving dock from which Taku was launched just a few days before. She was the last built of the three sister ships. The ship was launched on December 5, 1962. She was christened by Anne Lewellen, wife of Alaska Marine Transportation Division Director Bafford E. Lewellen. George N. Hayes, Alaska attorney general, was the principal speaker at the ceremony. Matanuska completed her sea trials in May 1963 and was turned over to her new owners. She left Seattle for Alaska on June 7, 1963.

The ship is 408 feet (124 m) long with a beam of 74 feet (23 m), and a fully loaded draft of 16 ft 11.625 in (5.2 m). She displaces 5,569 long tons. Her gross tonnage calculated under international rules is 9,214, while her U.S. register gross tonnage is 3,029. At the time of their launch, the three sister-ships were the largest U.S.-flagged motorized ferries.

Matanuska can carry 450 passengers. She has 106 passenger staterooms with berths for 243. These are divided into 79 two-berth, 21 three-berth, five four-berth, and one wheelchair-accessible cabins. Passengers without a stateroom may use coin-operated lockers to stow their luggage, and public showers. She has a cafeteria, solarium, children's play area, and observation lounge. Her vehicle deck has 1,675 feet (511 m) of lanes, which can accommodate 83 standard-sized vehicles.

The ship cruises at 16.5 knots, at which speed she burns 234 gallons of fuel per hour. She has two Electro-Motive Diesel 16-710 G7C-T3 engines, each rated at 3,999 hp, which she uses for propulsion. This is the third set of main engines with which Matanuska has been equipped. In 2018, two MaK 9M453B 3,620 hp engines were replaced, which were installed in 1985. Her original engines were manufactured by the Enterprise Engine and Foundry division of General Metals Corporation. She has two four-bladed, variable-pitch propellers, and a bow thruster to improve maneuverability.

Matanuska normally sails with a crew of 48. Crew quarters are aboard so the ship can embark multiple watches for longer trips.

All Alaska Marine Highway System ships are named after glaciers. Matanuska is named for the Matanuska Glacier in the Chugach Mountains. Governor Egan announced the new name on September 4, 1962.

== Operating history ==
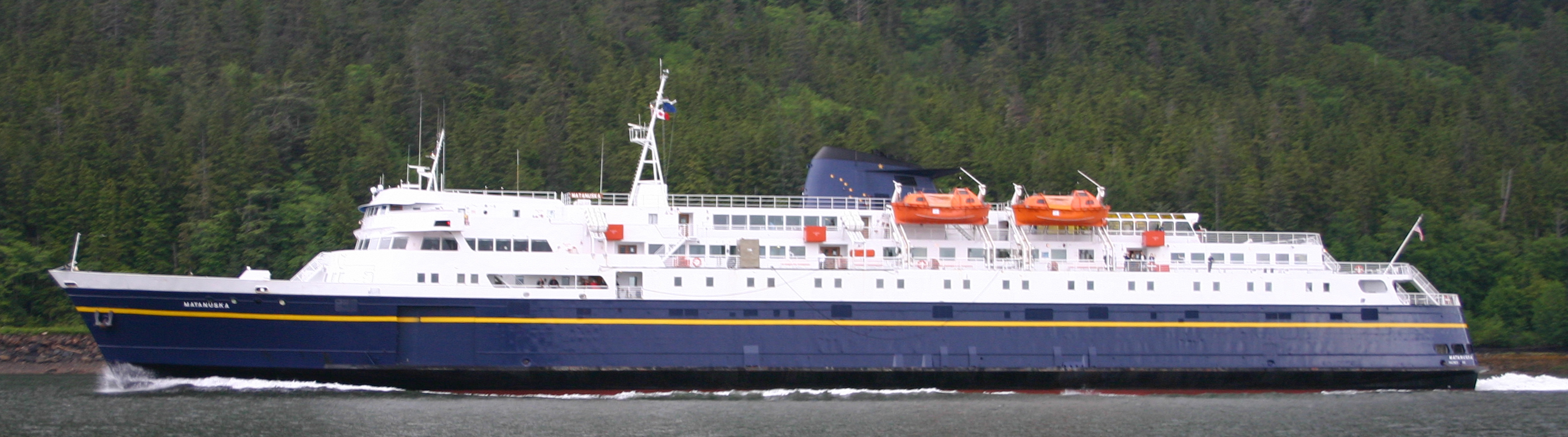
MV Matanuska underway in 2005

Matanuska's first route was from Prince Rupert, British Columbia, one end of the North American road network, to Skagway, with stops in Ketchikan, Wrangell, Petersburg, Sitka, Juneau, and Haines. Passengers who travelled the entire 30-hour trip paid $30 plus another $7.50 if they wanted a berth. Cars embarking at Prince Rupert paid $118 to reach Haines, where they could once again connect to mainland roads, or $122.50 to go through to Skagway at the end of the line.

She began her operational career on June 10, 1963, when she embarked 154 passengers and 45 cars at Prince Rupert. The initial public response to Matanuska was positive. During her first month of commercial operation, from June 15 to July 15, she carried 6,496 passengers and 1,302 vehicles. The Alaska Marine Highway System as a whole reached its four-year forecast for passenger boardings in the first six months of operation.

Ferry traffic peaked during the summers when tourists visited Alaska, so routine maintenance on Matanuska has generally been scheduled during the winters. For example, on January 6, 1964, she left Ketchikan for shipyards in Seattle. She stopped at Lake Union Drydock Company for the installation of additional staterooms, Todd Shipyards for equipment overhauls, and back to her builder, Puget Sound Bridge and Dry Dock, for warranty work. As in this 1964 maintenance interval, much of her routine maintenance during her early decades was done in Washington shipyards. As Alaska Ship and Drydock in Ketchikan became more capable, some of this work was done in-state. A $5.1 million contract for Matanuska's winter 2001 work was the largest contract ever received by the company at that time.

In December of 1967, Matanuska inaugurated direct ferry service between the Lower 48 and Alaska. She completed the route between Seattle and Ketchikan in about 43 hours. While the southern terminus of this route was moved to Bellingham in October 1989, the Inside Passage route remains part of the Alaska Marine Highway System. Matanuska has sailed it periodically over the years, including in 2020.

Alaska's ships periodically failed to meet demand for lack of sufficient capacity. This was particularly true when one of them was out of service for maintenance. Malaspina was lengthened in 1972 at the Willamette Iron and Steel Company in Portland, Oregon, to increase her capacity. In July 1977, the state of Alaska awarded a $15,228,500 contract to the same shipyard to lengthen Matanuska, as well. The ship was cut in two, and a new midsection, 56 feet (17 m) long, was welded into the hull just ahead of the funnel. New staterooms, crew quarters, dining facilities, deckhouses, elevators, and masts were added.

In May 2018, Matanuska was taken out of service and began a major refit, including the replacement of her main engines, reduction gears, propeller shafts, shaft bearings, and variable-pitch propellers, among other items. The work was done by Vigor Industrial at its Portland shipyard. The refit ultimately cost $47 million and took until November 2019 to complete. In January 2020, one of her new reduction gears failed and she was out of service again for more repairs.

Aside from her mechanical troubles, in 2020, Matanuska and the rest of the Alaska Marine Highway System were affected by COVID-19 and by budget cuts imposed by Governor Mike Dunleavy. Matanuska was scheduled to resume her mainline route from Bellingham to Skagway on July 3, 2020, but without service to the Prince Rupert terminal due to virus restrictions. Service was suspended temporarily in August for crew testing when five passengers tested positive for the virus.

In 2022, extensive steel damage was discovered along with many other serious issues. She hasn't carried passengers since, and has been tied up in Ketchikan Alaska being used as a "hotel ship" for AMHS employees. As of march 2026, in the face of over $45 million estimate to restore the vessel to service, the State of Alaska has decided to start seeking options to retire the Matanuska.

=== Accidents ===
The waters of Southeast Alaska plied by Matanuska are complex, with a number of narrow passages, and high tidal ranges and swift currents are the norm. This has led to a number of accidents over the years.

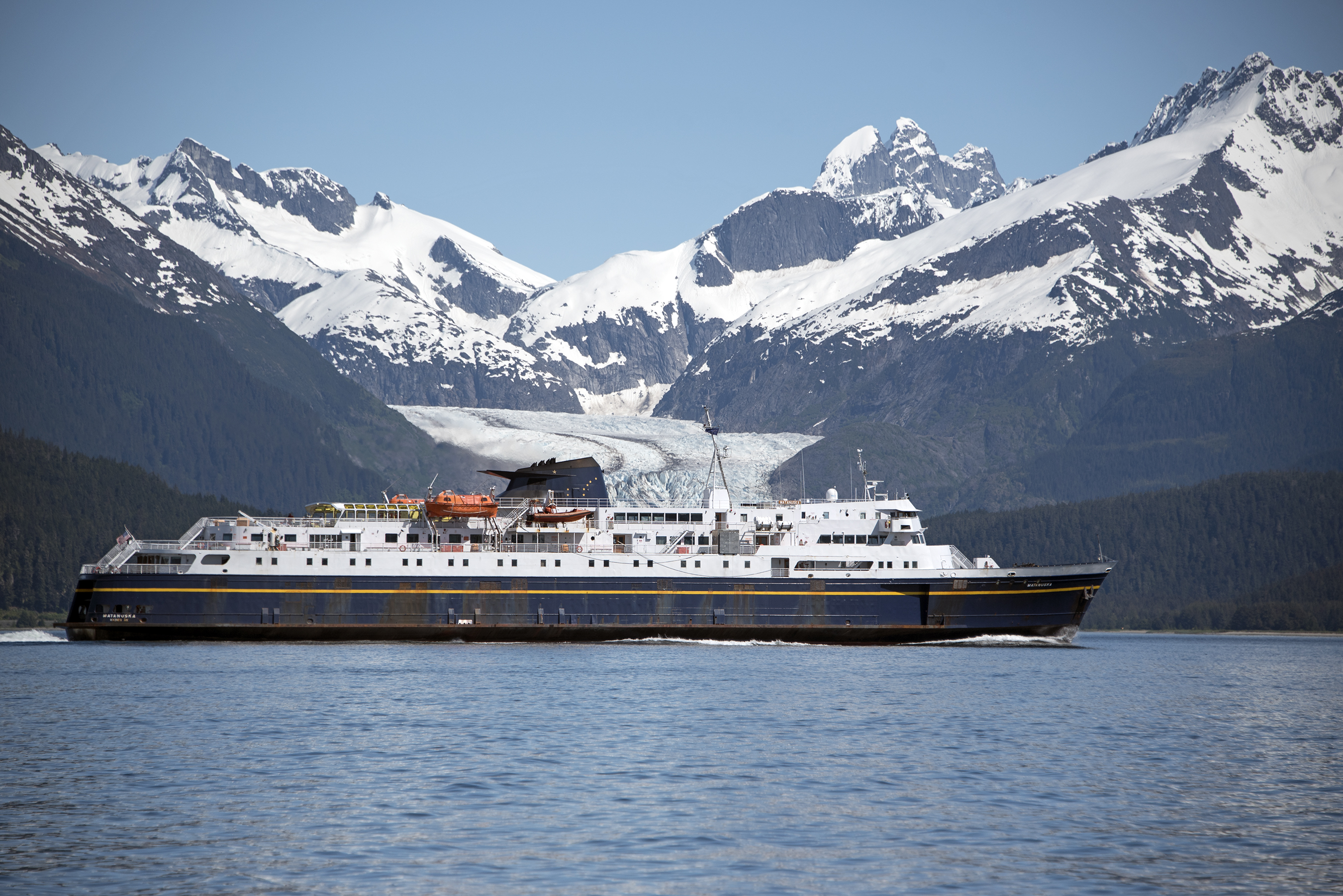
MV Matanuska passing the Herbert Glacier

Matanuska was passing through Sergius Narrows north of Sitka on August 31, 1963, when she scraped her port side on a submerged ledge. Damage was slight, but she was forced to sail to Seattle for a dry-dock inspection and repairs. It was her captain's first trip through the narrows.

On September 24, 1964, the ship hit a submerged object in Wrangell Narrows and bent three of the four blades on her starboard propeller and her starboard propeller shaft. She was forced to sail to Seattle on one engine for repairs.

The ship was backing into the ferry terminal in Bellingham on February 1, 1991, when a mechanical failure occurred. High winds complicated maneuvering at the time of the failure. Matanuska backed into a dock, crushing it, with pieces falling onto her stern. Cars on the ferry's vehicle deck were crushed and gasoline spilled. Two passengers were injured. The ship was taken out of service briefly and underwent repairs at a Bellingham shipyard.

On May 7, 2012, Matanuska collided with the dock of the Ocean Beauty Seafoods processing plant in Petersburg. Damage was extensive to the building and dock, while the ship received only "dents...above the waterline". No injuries occurred either ashore or on Matanuska. After an inspection by the U.S. Coast Guard, she was deemed seaworthy and continued onto other ports to pick up passengers, though two hours behind schedule. The cause of the crash was determined to be conning errors made by the master, who attempted to use a known countercurrent to slow the ship on the approach into port. However, the countercurrent was not present that day, resulting in a higher-than-expected approach speed. Matanuska was carrying 60 passengers at the time of the crash.
