= Tustumena =

Mainline ferry vessel

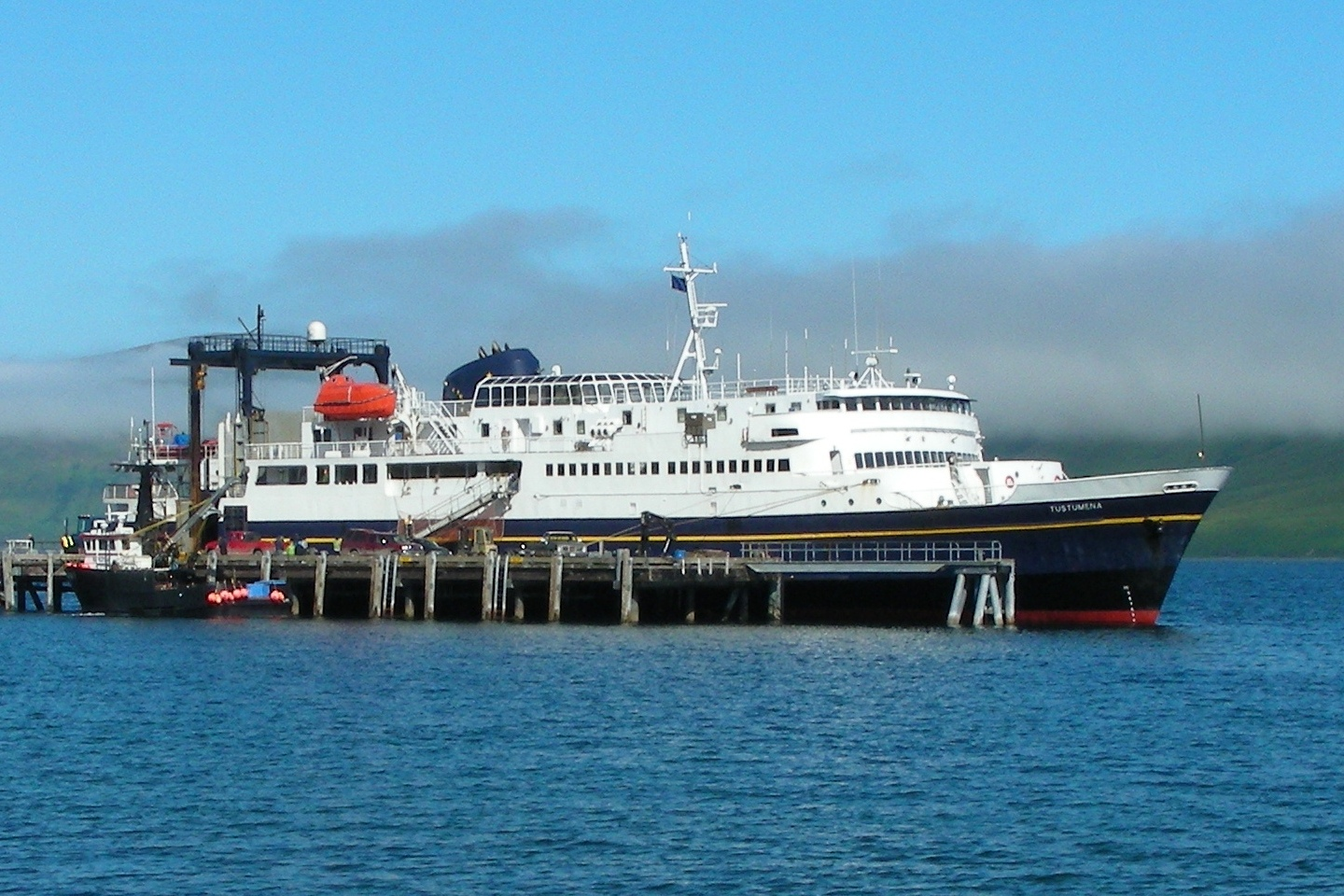
- The M/V Tustumena at the dock in False Pass, Alaska

History
- Name: Tustumena
- Namesake: Tustumena Glacier in the Kenai Peninsula
- Owner: Alaska Marine Highway System
- Port of registry: United States
- Builder: Christy Corporation, Sturgeon Bay, Wisconsin
- Launched: 1963
- Commissioned: 1964
- Home port: Kodiak, Alaska
- Identification: IMO number: 6421086; MMSI number: 303267000; Callsign: WGNW
- Status: in active service

General characteristics
- Displacement: 3,067 long tons (3,116 t)
- Length: 296 ft (90 m)
- Beam: 56 ft (17 m)
- Draft: 14 ft 4.5 in (4.382 m)
- Decks: One vehicle deck
- Ramps: Aft port and aft starboard ro-ro loading
- Installed power: 5,100 hp (3,803 kW)
- Speed: 13.85 knots (25.65 km/h; 15.94 mph)
- Capacity: 211 passengers; 36 vehicles

M/V Tustumena is a mainline ferry vessel for the Alaska Marine Highway System.

Tustumena was constructed in 1963 by Christy Corporation in Sturgeon Bay, Wisconsin and refurbished in 1969 in San Francisco. As the only mainline ferry in South-central Alaska and the Aleutian Chain, it principally runs between Kodiak, Seldovia, Port Lions, and Homer with Homer providing a road link to the other communities on the Kenai Peninsula. The only interruptions from this schedule occur when making a voyage out the Aleutian Chain (the Aleutian Chain run consists of the communities of Akutan, Chignik, Cold Bay, False Pass, King Cove, Sand Point, and Unalaska/Dutch Harbor) which the vessel undergoes eight times a year all of which occur during the summer as winter weather becomes too dangerous.

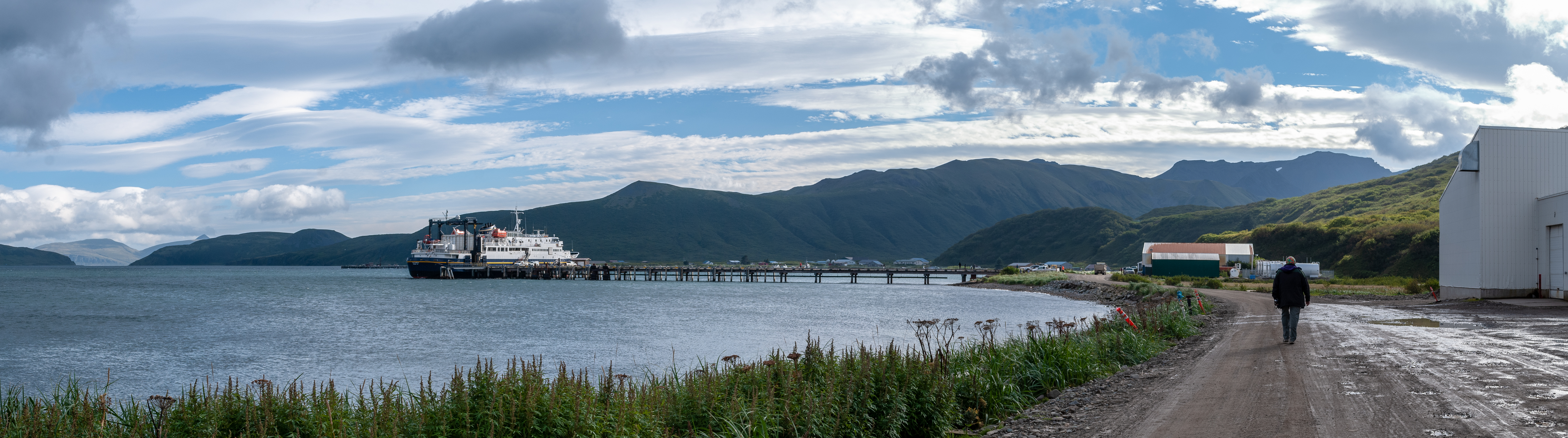
AMHS passenger and vehicle ferry, MV Tustumena, at the public dock in False Pass, Alaska

Because of the exposed and unstable parts of Alaska it plies, the Tustumena is an accredited ocean-going vessel, a quality it shares exclusively with the Kennicott. As such, the Tustumena is replaced by the M/V Kennicott when it undergoes annual maintenance.

The Tustumena is the smallest AMHS vessel to have cabins. The Tustumena's amenities include a full service dining room; cocktail lounge and bar (which is now closed; there is wine and beer service at meals); solarium; forward, aft, movie, and business lounges; eight four-berth cabins and 18 two-berth cabins. The large black structure on the aft portion of the vessel is a car elevator. It is used in all communities where there is not a dedicated ramp loading directly into the car deck. While the car elevator for the Tustumena is exposed on the exterior, the Kennicott car elevator is located inside the vessel.

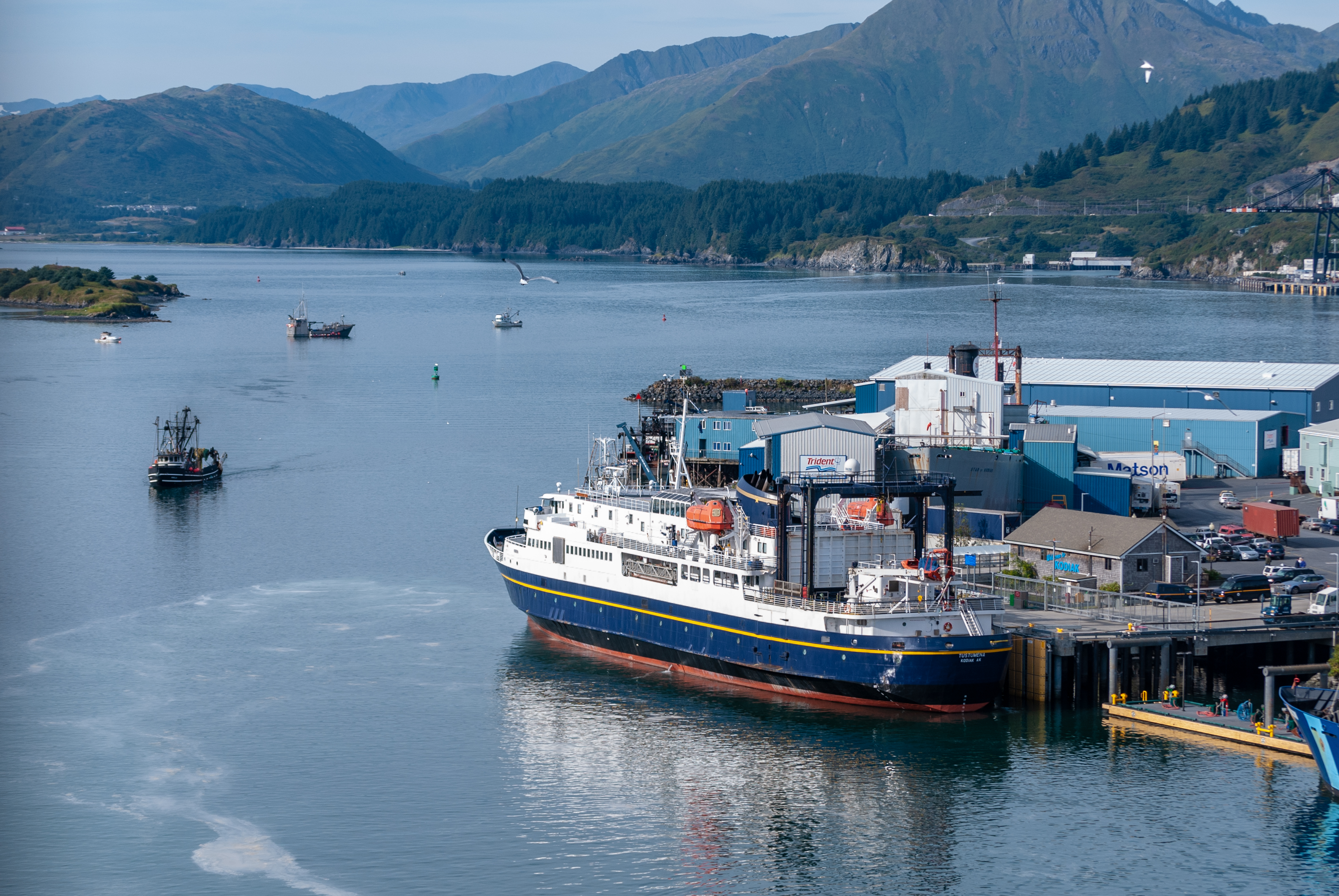
AMHS ferry, MV Tutsumena, docked in Kodiak, Alaska

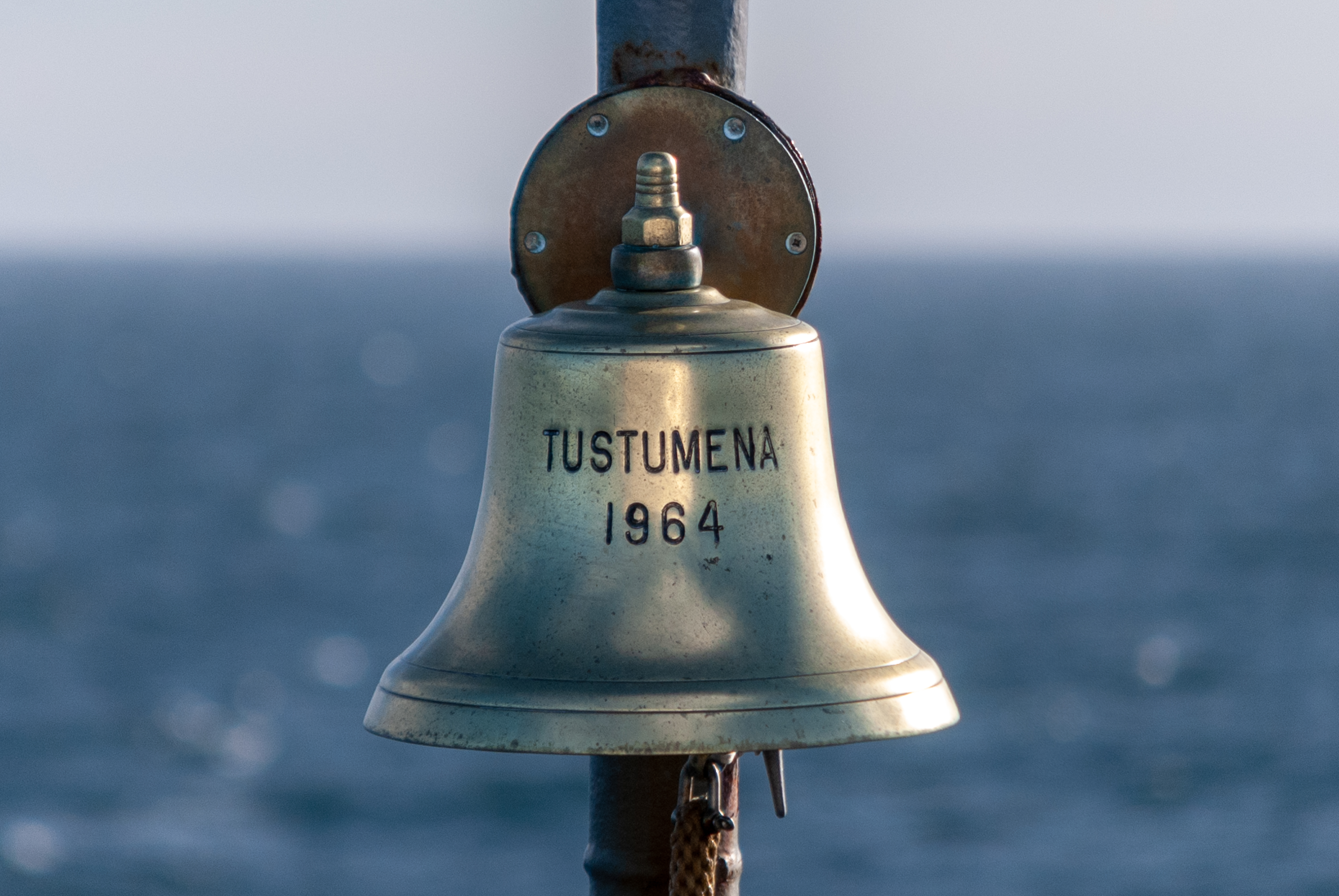
Bell on the bow with build date “1964”

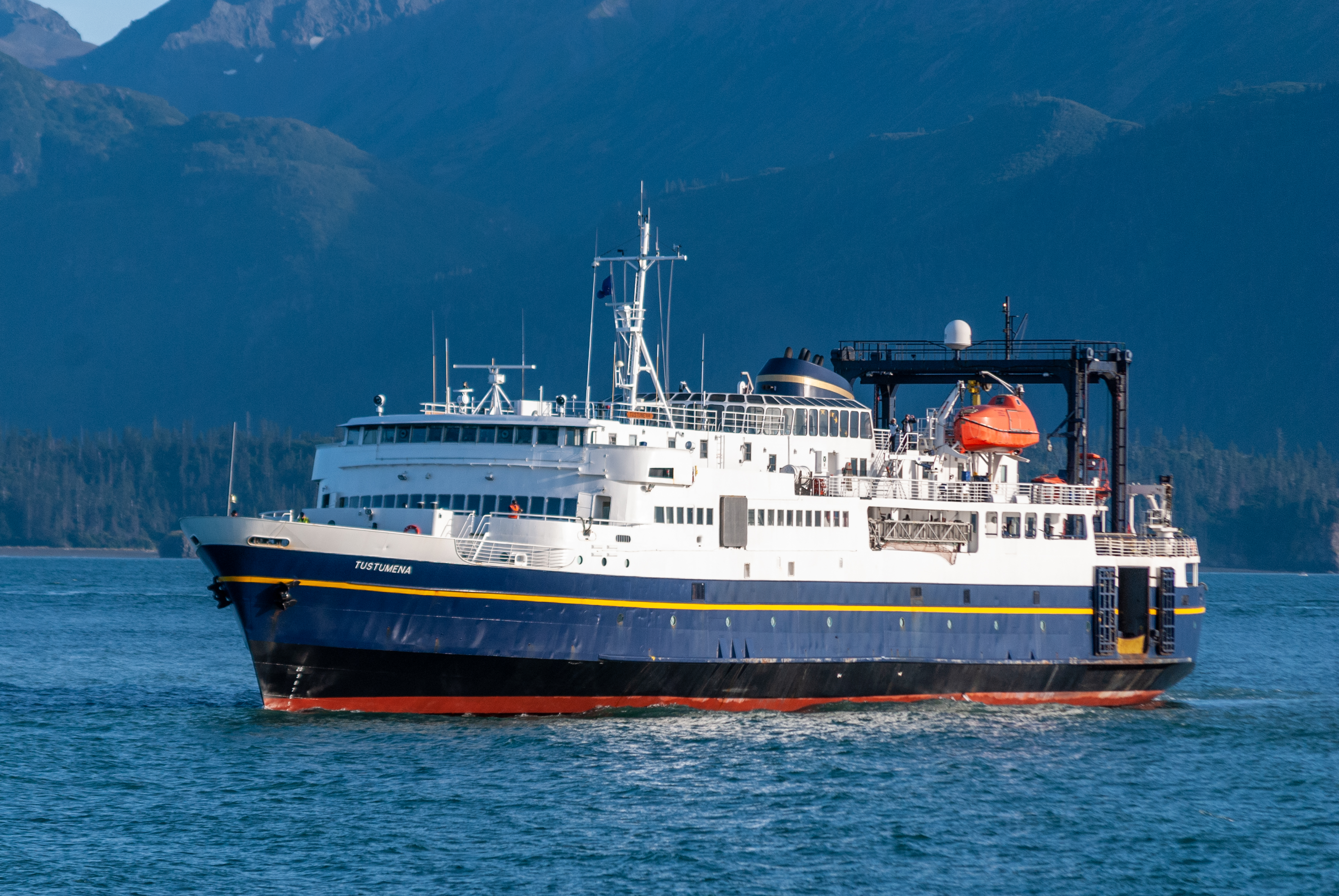
MV Tutsumena coming into Homer Spit, Alaska

== Future ==
Due to its age and frequent need for repairs, the ship is nicknamed the Rusty Tusty.

In the fall of 2012, Tustumena went into scheduled maintenance at the dry-docks of Seward Alaska. Several found issues pushed her return from service from the original May 29th to a planned July 23rd, leaving the state without a ship available to do her run. The return to service was delayed twice more, due to the discovery of serious issues with the vessel's steel and further delays at the shipyard. The ship missed the entire summer season and was not returned to service until October. Given the age of the vessel, and her extended time in dry-dock, the State is looking to find or build a replacement vessel, design work began in the fall of 2013 but was not completed until early 2016. The vessel is planned to be largely funded by the federally-funded Alaska Statewide Transportation Improvement Plan, and is not slated to begin construction before 2019.

In 2017, scheduled repairs once again revealed serious issues. It was found that the steel on the car deck needed to be replaced entirely and the vessel was delayed from returning to service. During the course of that work being done, rusted and pitted steel was also discovered in the engine room, and those repairs caused the ferry to miss the bulk of the summer season. The M/V Kennicott provided services between Homer and Seldovia and Kodiak on a limited schedule. A private carrier provided freight service to the Aleutian islands but was not permitted for passenger transport.

In 2023 the state received a grant for ferry revitalization via the Infrastructure Investment and Jobs Act, a large portion of which is marked to be used to replace Tustumena with a hybrid diesel-electric ferry, a first for Alaska.
