= MV Taku =

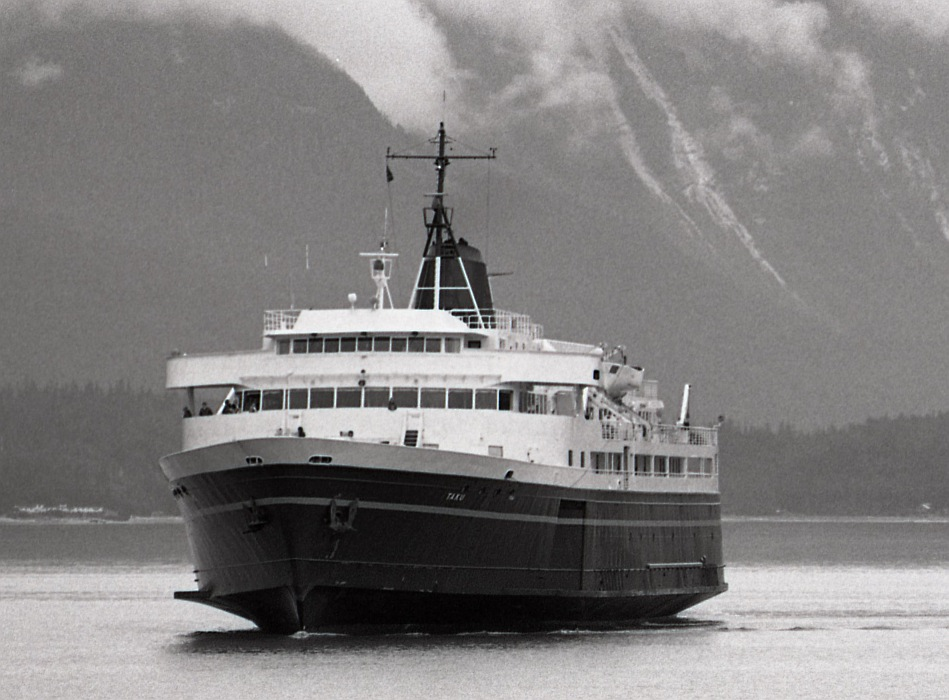
- MV Taku

History
- Name: Taku
- Namesake: Taku Glacier, Juneau, Alaska
- Owner: Alaska Marine Highway System
- Port of registry: United States
- Builder: Puget Sound Bridge & Dry Dock Company, Seattle, Washington
- Cost: US$4.5 Million
- Launched: 2 July 1962
- Commissioned: 1963
- Identification: IMO number: 5351052; MMSI number: 338697000; Callsign: WI9491
- Fate: Scrapped 21 April 2018

General characteristics
- Class & type: Malaspina-class mainline ferry
- Tonnage: 2,625 Domestic 7,302 International
- Displacement: 4,283 long tons (4,352 t)
- Length: 352 ft (107 m)
- Beam: 74 ft (23 m)
- Draft: 16 ft 11 in (5.16 m)
- Decks: One vehicle deck, three passenger decks
- Ramps: Aft, port, and starboard ro-ro loading
- Installed power: Two 4,000 hp MaK Diesel engines
- Speed: 16.5 knots (30.6 km/h; 19.0 mph)
- Capacity: 370 passengers; 69 vehicles
- Crew: 42

M/V Taku was a Malaspina-class mainline vessel built for the Alaska Marine Highway System. The ship has been retired and was sold to a Dubai-based company for $171,000. The owner sought to sell the ferry internationally, and was unsuccessful, and it was last seen beached in Alang, India, to be scrapped.

== History ==
Designed by Philip F. Spaulding & Associates, constructed in 1963 by the Puget Sound Bridge & Dry Dock Company in Seattle, Washington, the M/V Taku is named after Taku Glacier which is located just southeast of Juneau, Alaska, and has been in the ferry system for over forty years. In 1981, the Taku received a major refurbishment and was in service steadily until the summer of 2015 when she was laid up due to budget considerations. The AMHS subsequently announced that it would retire the vessel in preparation for sale or scrapping.

== Role ==
As a mainline ferry, Taku served the larger of the inside passage communities (such as Ketchikan, Petersburg, and Sitka), its route primarily stayed between Ketchikan and Skagway in Southeast Alaska.

The M/V Taku was the largest of the three AMHS vessels able to serve the communities of Hoonah and Kake and because of this served as a critical component of providing transportation out of Hoonah and Kake after the "milk run" ferry, the MV LeConte hit a rock and went into dry dock.

== Amenities ==
The Taku's amenities included a hot-food cafeteria; bar; solarium; forward, aft, recliner, movie, and business lounges; gift shop; 8 four-berth cabins; and 36 two-berth cabins.

== Accidents and Incidents ==
- On April 23, 1963 the Taku struck a rock outside Petersburg in a minus tide. She returned to service on May 3rd.
- On August 8, 1963 two boys entered the wheelhouse when the Taku was preparing to leave Petersburg, and engaged the engines. The resulting damage to the dock left the vehicle loading ramp out of commission for three months.
- On July 29, 1970, the Taku ran aground on Kinihan Island, outside of Prince Rupert, Canada. All passengers on board were evacuated safely, and the cars were transferred to the BC Ferry Queen of Prince Rupert
