= Aurora Glacier (Alaska) =

Glacier in Alaska, United States

- Location within Alaska
- Interactive map of Aurora Glacier
- Location: Alaska
- Coordinates: 58°39′58″N 136°42′12″W
- Length: 4-mile (6.4 km)

Aurora Glacier is a 4-mile (6.4 km) long glacier in the U.S. state of Alaska. It heads east of July Fourth Mountain and trends northwest to an icefield between the heads of Reid and Brady Glaciers in Glacier Bay National Park and Preserve, 61 miles (98 km) northwest of Hoonah.

The glacier is the namesake for the Alaska Marine Highway vessel M/V Aurora.

== See also ==
- List of glaciers in the United States
