= MV Tazlina =

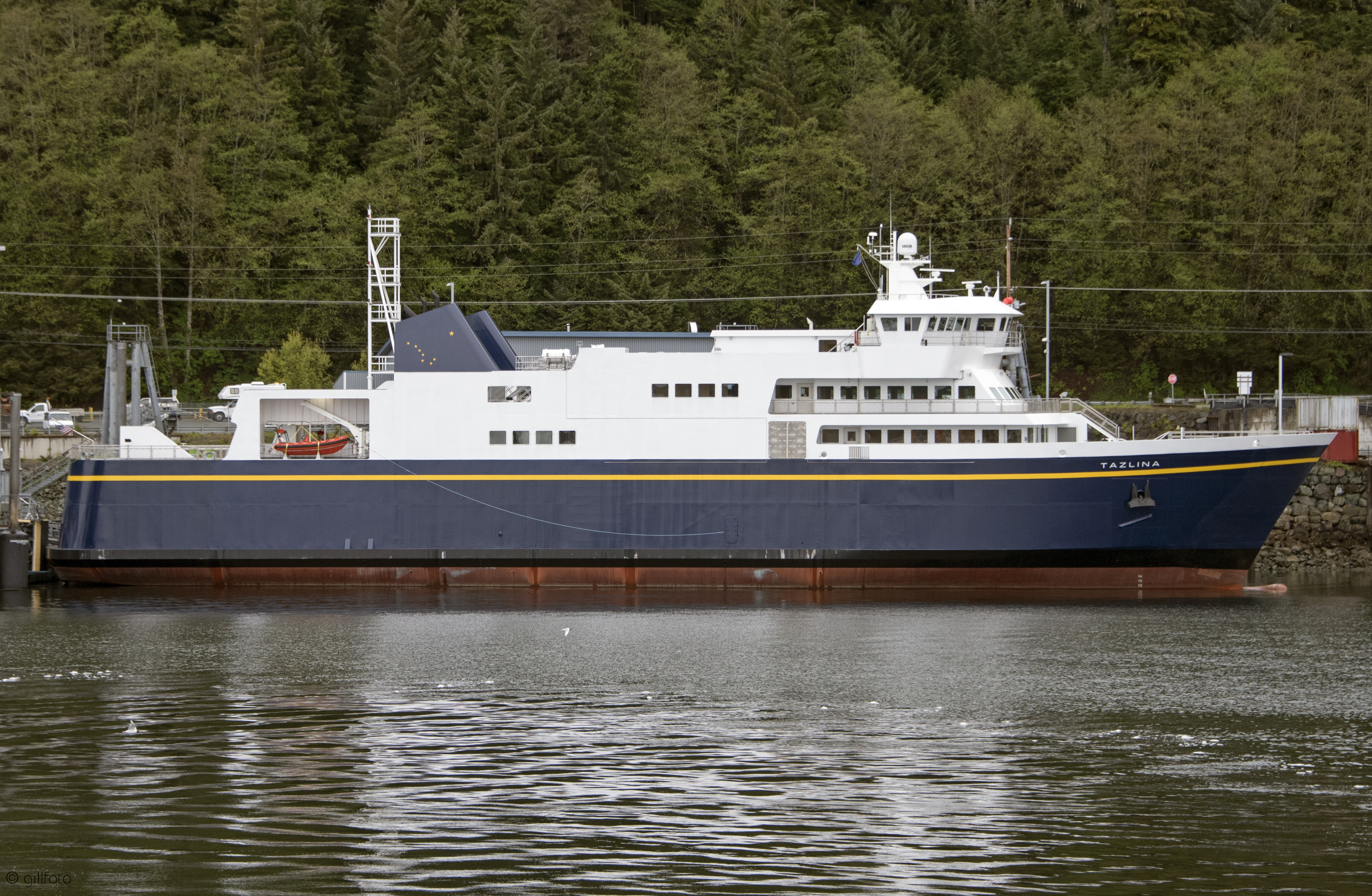
- MV Tazlina

History

United States
- Name: Tazlina
- Namesake: Tazlina Glacier
- Operator: Alaska Marine Highway System
- Port of registry: Valdez, Alaska
- Ordered: October 16, 2014
- Builder: Vigor Alaska
- Laid down: December 13, 2014
- Launched: May 16, 2018
- Christened: August 11, 2018
- Maiden voyage: May 7, 2019
- Identification: IMO number: 9812157; MMSI number: 368015640; Callsign: WDJ8361; Official Number: 1290456

General characteristics
- Tonnage: 5,304 GT
- Displacement: 3,016 long tons (3,064 t)
- Length: 280 ft (85 m)
- Beam: 67 ft (20 m)
- Draft: 13 ft 11 in (4.24 m)
- Decks: One vehicle deck; One passenger deck
- Ramps: Bow, port, and aft ro-ro loading
- Installed power: 2 x 12-710G7CT3 EMD diesel engines
- Propulsion: 2 x 4-bladed variable-pitch propellers
- Speed: 16.5 knots (30.6 km/h; 19.0 mph)
- Capacity: 300 passengers; 53 vehicles

MV Tazlina is a ferry operated by the Alaska Marine Highway System. It began serving Southeast Alaska Communities in 2019.

== Background ==
In late 2006, the Alaska Marine Highway System began a study for a new Lynn Canal ferry. A number of different concepts were explored over the years and succeeding governors had different ideas for new ferries. In 2010 the Alaska legislature appropriated $60 million for the first "Alaska"-class ferry. This was to be matched by $68 million of federal funding. Later in 2010 Governor Sean Parnell made the decision to forgo any federal funding of the ferry, opting instead to give the contract to an Alaskan firm in order to bring jobs to the state and stimulate the local shipbuilding industry. The legislature backed the governor, appropriating an additional $60 million for the ferry in 2011 to make up for lost federal funding. In April 2012 the Alaska Department of Transportation contracted with Alaska Ship and Drydock, later acquired by Vigor Industrial, to assist in the design of the ship with the expectation that it would bid on its construction at the shipyard it managed in Ketchikan.

By the end of 2012 cost estimates for the proposed 350 feet (110 m) vessel significantly exceeded the $120 million that had been appropriated. Governor Parnell ordered a halt to the project and redirected the effort towards two smaller, cheaper day-use vessels. The Elliott Bay Design Group of Seattle, Washington delivered a preliminary design study for the smaller day boat Alaska-class ferries in the summer of 2013 and a final design in 2014. Based on this design, a request for proposal was sent to Vigor Alaska on August 1, 2014. Negotiations between the state and Vigor resulted in a contract signing on October 16, 2014, for the construction of two ferries for a guaranteed maximum price of $101,513,651.

== Description ==
Tazlina is 280 feet (85 m) long, with a beam of 67 feet (20 m), and a full-load draft of 13 ft 11 in (4.24 m). The hull is constructed of welded steel plates. It displaces 3,016 long tons (3,064 t). Its gross tonnage under international rules is 5,304, while its U.S. gross register tonnage is 3,217. It has vehicle loading doors in the transom, bow, and port side to accommodate different port configurations.

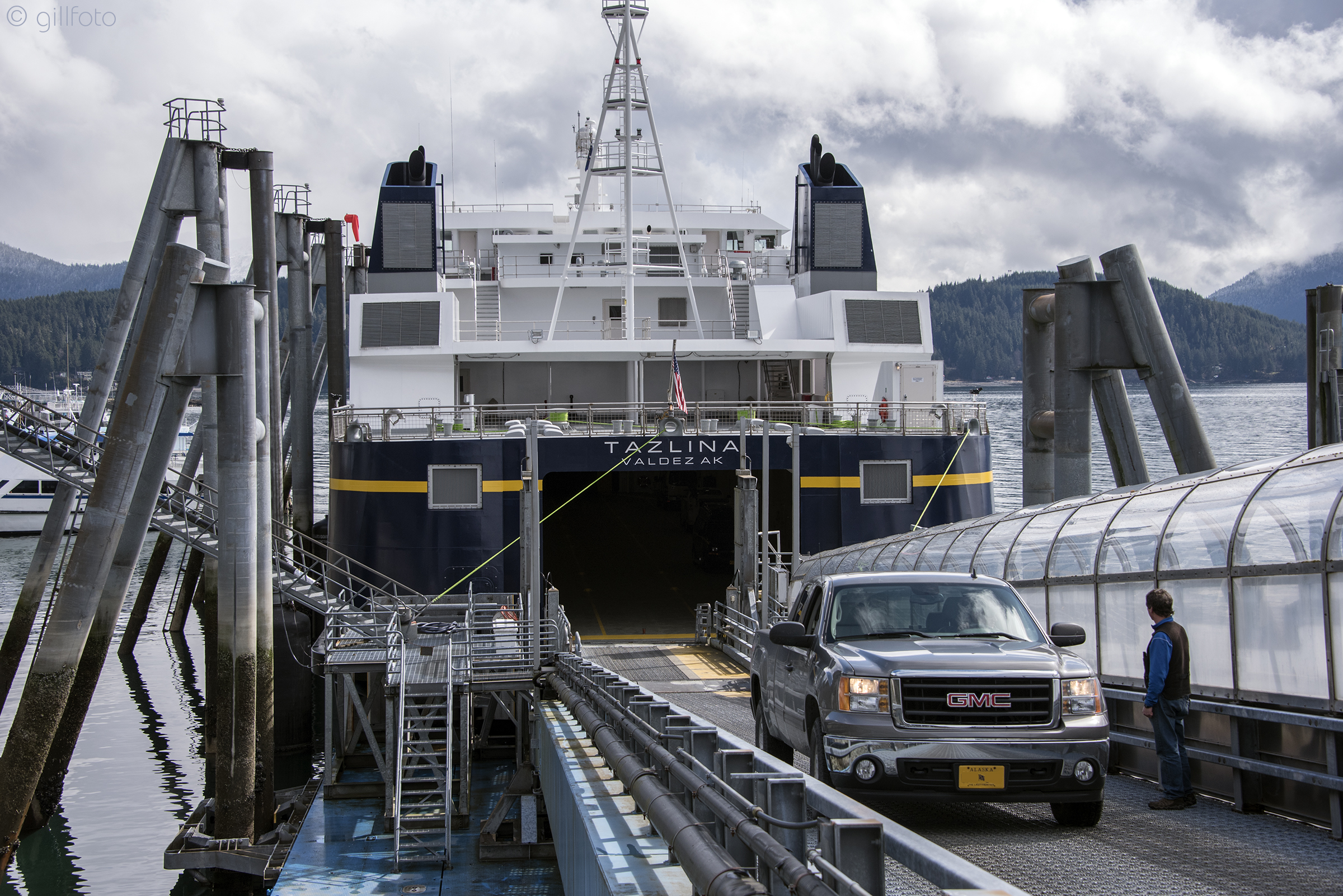
Stern loading on MV Tazlina

At a cruising speed of 16.5 knots (30.6 km/h; 19.0 mph), it burns 250 gallons of diesel fuel per hour, and its maximum speed is 17.9 knots (33.2 km/h; 20.6 mph). It has two Electro-Motive Diesel 12-710G7CT3 engines which produce 3,000 brake horsepower (2,200 kW) each. They drive two four-bladed variable-pitch propellers which are 8.5 feet (2.6 m) in diameter. The ship also has a bow thruster. Electrical power on the ship is provided by three Caterpillar C-18 generators capable for producing 500 kW (670 hp) each. The ship's tanks hold 49,900 US gallons (189,000 L) of diesel fuel and 18,000 US gallons (68,000 L) of potable water.

The ship's vehicle deck has 850 feet (260 m) of lanes, which can accommodate 53 standard-sized vehicles. Its single passenger deck has a capacity of 300 passengers, and is equipped with a cafeteria, solarium, quiet room, and children's play area. Tazlina was built as a day boat, so it has no crew quarters for overnight accommodation or passenger staterooms. It normally carries a crew of 14.

== Construction and career ==
Tazlina's keel was laid in a ceremony attended by Governor Bill Walker on December 13, 2014. The vessel was built as 23 prefabricated modules that were assembled into the ship. It was the first Alaska-class ferry and the largest vessel ever built in the state. It was launched on May 16, 2018, with little fanfare. The public ceremony came on August 11, 2018, when Tazlina was christened in Ketchikan by former Alaska First Lady Donna Walker.

All Alaska Marine Highway Ferries are named after glaciers. Tazlina's namesake is the Tazlina glacier. The name was selected in 2016 through an essay contest for Alaskan school children. Seventh-grader Malea Voran of Port Alsworth nominated Tazlina because it is an Athabaskan word for "swift river", which she thought appropriate for the ferry.

=== Operating history ===
Tazlina made its maiden voyage on May 7, 2019, from Juneau to Haines. Its regular schedule during the 2019 summer season was to sail from Juneau to Haines, then to Skagway, and then back to Haines (where it docked for the night), returning to Juneau the next day. It was scheduled to complete this round-trip three times a week, replacing the MV Fairweather on this route.

Tazlina and the rest of the Alaska Marine Highway System were idled when ferry workers struck on July 24, 2019. A settlement was reach and it returned to service on August 4, 2019. It was idled again at the end of the summer season but returned to service in Lynn Canal on November 22, 2019, as a replacement for two ferries with maintenance issues. Tazlina was idled again in mid-January for repairs and warranty work, returning to service on March 5, 2020.

The cost of Tazlina's overnight crew accommodations in Haines during the summer 2019 season exceeded budget by $400,000. This overnight stop arose from U.S. Coast Guard regulations restricting ship crews to no more than a 12-hour shift, Tazlina's service speed, and its lack of crew accommodations. The Alaska Marine Highway System proposed to retrofit crew quarters into Tazlina and Hubbard. This would allow them to complete longer routes, but at a cost of over $30 million. The legislature appropriated almost $17 million to retrofit one of the ships, but Governor Mike Dunleavy vetoed the appropriation in April 2020. Instead, the ship was scheduled for separate Juneau-Skagway and Juneau-Haines roundtrips during the summer of 2020.

In the face of state budget cuts and reduced passengers due to the COVID-19 pandemic, Tazlina did not sail during the summer 2020 season. As of August 2020, Tazlina remained idle, moored at the Auke Bay ferry terminal.
