= MV Kennicott =

Alaska state ferry

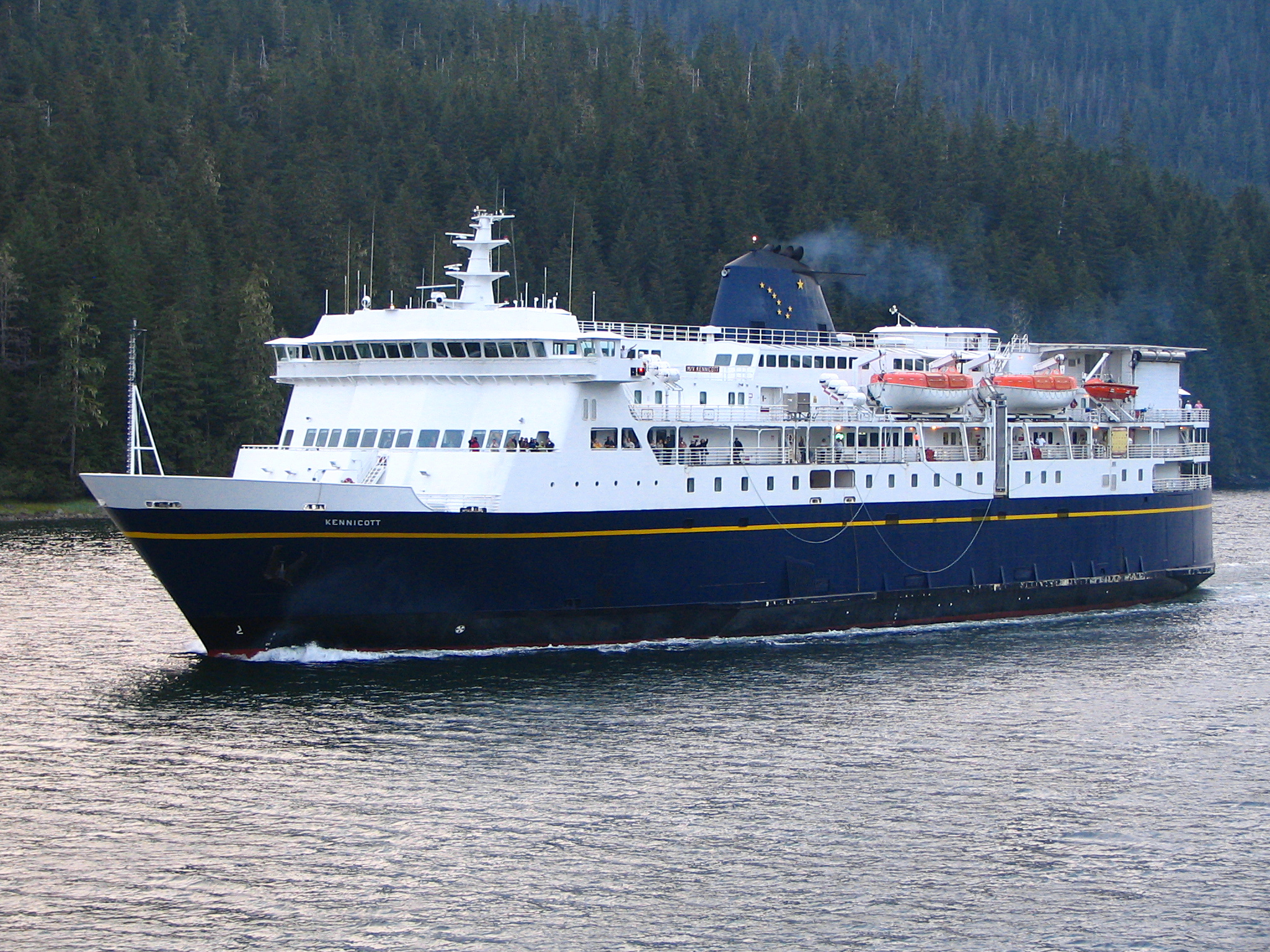
- Kennicott

History
- Name: Kennicott
- Namesake: Kennicott Glacier, Wrangell Mountains
- Owner: Alaska Marine Highway System
- Port of registry: United States
- Builder: Halter Marine Group, Moss Point, Mississippi
- Launched: 1998
- Commissioned: 1998
- Home port: Valdez, Alaska
- Identification: IMO number: 9145205; MMSI number: 368250000; Callsign: WCY2920
- Status: Active

General characteristics
- Tonnage: 12,635 GT
- Length: 382 ft (116 m)
- Beam: 85 ft (26 m)
- Draft: 17 ft 6 in (5.33 m)
- Decks: One vehicle deck
- Ramps: Aft, port, and starboard ro-ro loading
- Installed power: 12,350 hp (9,209 kW)
- Speed: 16.75 knots (31.02 km/h; 19.28 mph)
- Capacity: 748 passengers; 80 vehicles

Kennicott is a mainline ferry vessel for the Alaska Marine Highway System.

Constructed in 1998 by the Halter Marine Group in Moss Point, Mississippi, the Kennicott has been one of the most vital vessels to the Alaska ferry system since its inception. It is nine-deck, ocean certified vessel and is also able to serve as a command and logistics vessel in the event of disaster or oil spill. The ferry system, taking advantage of her ocean-going status, sends the vessel on a monthly trans-Gulf of Alaska ("cross-gulf") voyage beginning in Juneau and concluding in Kodiak. On this voyage, the Kennicott is able to provide service to the isolated Gulf of Alaska community of Yakutat and is the only vessel to do so. The cross-gulf voyages are very popular and quite often sold out. The Kennicott and the Tustumena are the Alaska Marine Highway's only accredited ocean-going vessels. The Kennicott also serves as a mainline relief ferry in the event other ferries are out of service.

The Kennicott's amenities include a hot-food cafeteria; cocktail lounge and bar; solarium; forward, aft, movie, and business lounges; gift shop; 51 four-berth cabins; and 58 two-berth cabins. The aft portion of the Kennicott appears bloated because there is an external car elevator built into the superstructure. The elevator is used in ports without roll-on ramps allowing service to ordinary docks. Tustumena is the only other ferry with this feature.

The ship struck a humpback whale in mid 2014.
