= MV Columbia =

Ferry operated by the Alaska Marine Highway

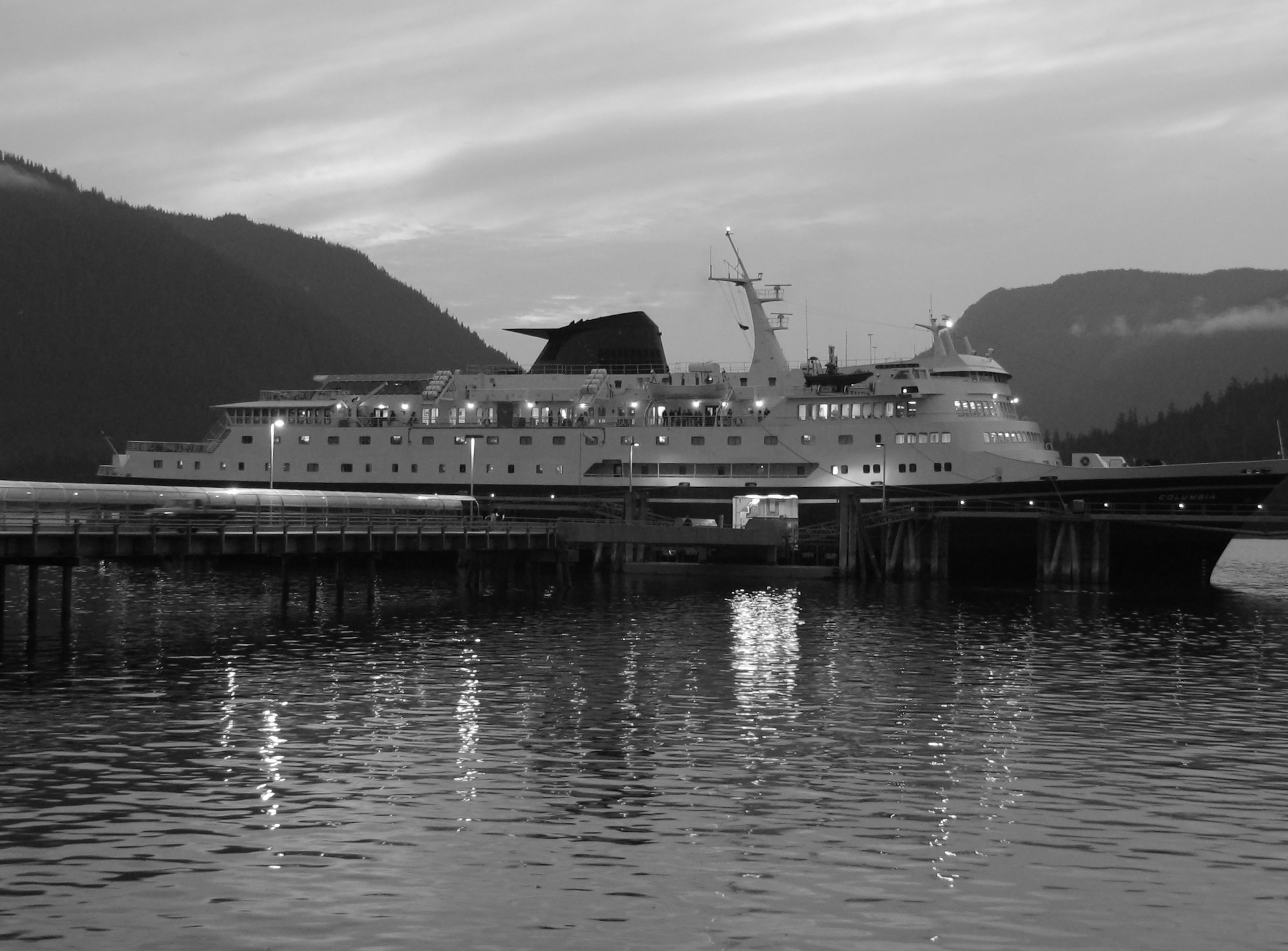

History
- Name: Columbia
- Namesake: Columbia Glacier in the Chugach Mountains, which is in turn named for Columbia University
- Owner: Alaska Marine Highway System
- Port of registry: United States
- Route: Bellingham, Washington; Ketchikan, Alaska; Wrangell, Alaska; Petersburg, Alaska; Sitka, Alaska; Haines, Alaska; Skagway, Alaska; Juneau, Alaska
- Builder: Lockheed Shipbuilding Seattle, Washington
- Acquired: 1974
- Home port: Ketchikan, Alaska
- Identification: IMO number: 7320095; MMSI number: 367144000; Callsign: WYR2092; O.N. 557340; ABS I.D. 7408017

General characteristics
- Class & type: RORO ferry
- Displacement: 7,745 long tons (7,869 t) (SW)
- Length: 418 ft (127 m)
- Beam: 85 ft 1.5 in (25.946 m)
- Draft: 24 ft (7.3 m)
- Decks: Two vehicle decks
- Installed power: 12,350 hsp
- Propulsion: 2 × V 12 Enterprises 9,000 hp (6,700 kW)+ each.
- Speed: 17.3 knots (32.0 km/h; 19.9 mph); On Bunker "C" fuel = 22.0 knots (40.7 km/h; 25.3 mph)
- Capacity: Passengers 499; Automobiles 134 (20 ft lengths)
- Notes: Aft, port, and starboard ro-ro loading

MV Columbia is a mainline ferry for the Alaska Marine Highway System.

Constructed in 1974 by Lockheed Shipbuilding in Seattle, Washington, the Columbia has been the flagship of the Alaska ferry system for over 40 years. As a mainline ferry, which means she serves the largest of the inside passage communities (such as Ketchikan, Wrangell, Petersburg, Juneau, Haines, Skagway, and Sitka), her route spans the entirety of the inside passage, often beginning runs in Bellingham, Washington and running to the northernmost Alaskan Panhandle community of Skagway stopping in communities along the way, during the summer season (winter services are sometimes operated by MV Malaspina). Columbia has an upper deck between the main vehicle deck and the cabin deck with additional vehicle stowage accessed by two vehicle elevators capable of hoisting 19 foot vehicles with their passengers, and additional passenger cabins.

On July 2, 2006, an auxiliary engine room fire broke out on the Columbia temporarily impairing steering and propulsion on her northbound voyage from Bellingham in Seymour Narrows in Canadian waters. She motored to Duncan Bay, British Columbia for damage assessment before continuing on to Ketchikan's Alaska Ship & Dry Dock for more extensive repairs.

Early on 15 August 2007, only two months before a scheduled overhaul, position number two connecting rod in the Columbia's starboard engine experienced a bearing failure. To prevent catastrophic damage to the surrounding components the engine was secured. The 268 passengers were rerouted, and she was sent to Ketchikan, where she was originally planned to be repaired within the week. Soon it became apparent that she would require further work, and in a controversial decision the Marine Highway System chose to cancel all further summer voyages on the ship pending repairs. Nearly all the other ships in the fleet were rerouted to make up for the loss of what many consider to be the flagship of the fleet, and many passengers were urged to seek alternative travel means to help ease the pressure on the system. Transferred to Cascade General shipyard at Swan Island in Portland, Oregon; both main engines were disassembled and overhauled. As of May 19, 2008 the Columbia left Cascade General and sailed to Bellingham to begin active service.

The ship was moored in Ketchikan for a winter layup period/heavy maintenance period from September 2009 to June 2010. During this period of time the propeller shafting and associated wheels were overhauled. The repair of damage sustained to the port main engine viscous damper drive coupling during the middle of the 2009 operating season was remediated as well.
