= MV Bartlett =

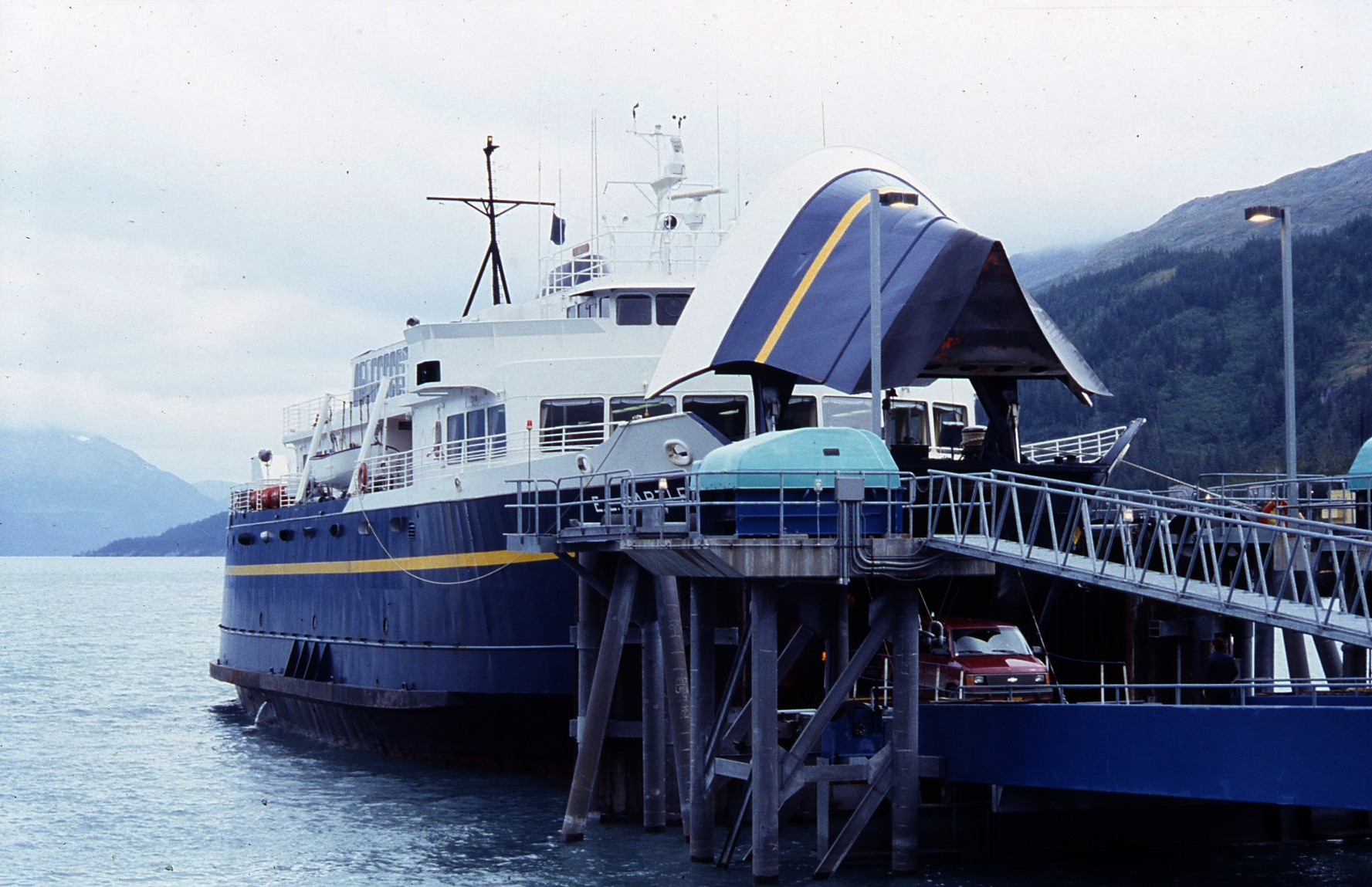
- M/V Bartlett

History
- Name: M/V Bartlett
- Namesake: E. L. Bartlett, early Alaskan Senator
- Owner: Alaska Marine Highway System
- Port of registry: United States
- Route: Cordova, Valdez, Whittier
- Launched: 1968
- Completed: 1968
- Acquired: by purchase, 1969
- Commissioned: 1968
- Decommissioned: 2003
- Identification: IMO number: 6927810; Callsign: WY6244
- Fate: Sold to All Alaskan Seafoods

General characteristics
- Displacement: 1500 ton
- Length: 193 ft (59 m)
- Beam: 53 ft (16 m)
- Decks: One vehicle deck
- Ramps: Bow
- Speed: 12
- Capacity: 236 passengers; 29 vehicles

M/V Bartlett was a ferry vessel for the Alaska Marine Highway servicing Prince William Sound. The 193-foot-long Bartlett was built for the Alaska Marine Highway System in 1968 by Jeffboat Inc. of Jeffersonville, Indiana, for $3.25 million. It was retired in 2003 due to impending regulations which would have required substantial and expensive upgrades.

It was sold on eBay in August 2003 to Lloyd Cannon, president of All Alaskan Seafoods and donated to the Seattle Maritime Academy. The closing price was $389,500.

In January 2019, the ship was towed from her berth at the Seattle Maritime Academy to Mountain Premiere Contracting and Demolition, Ltd. in British Columbia where she was scrapped.
