= MV Chilkat =

First ferry to be purpose built for the Alaska Marine Highway

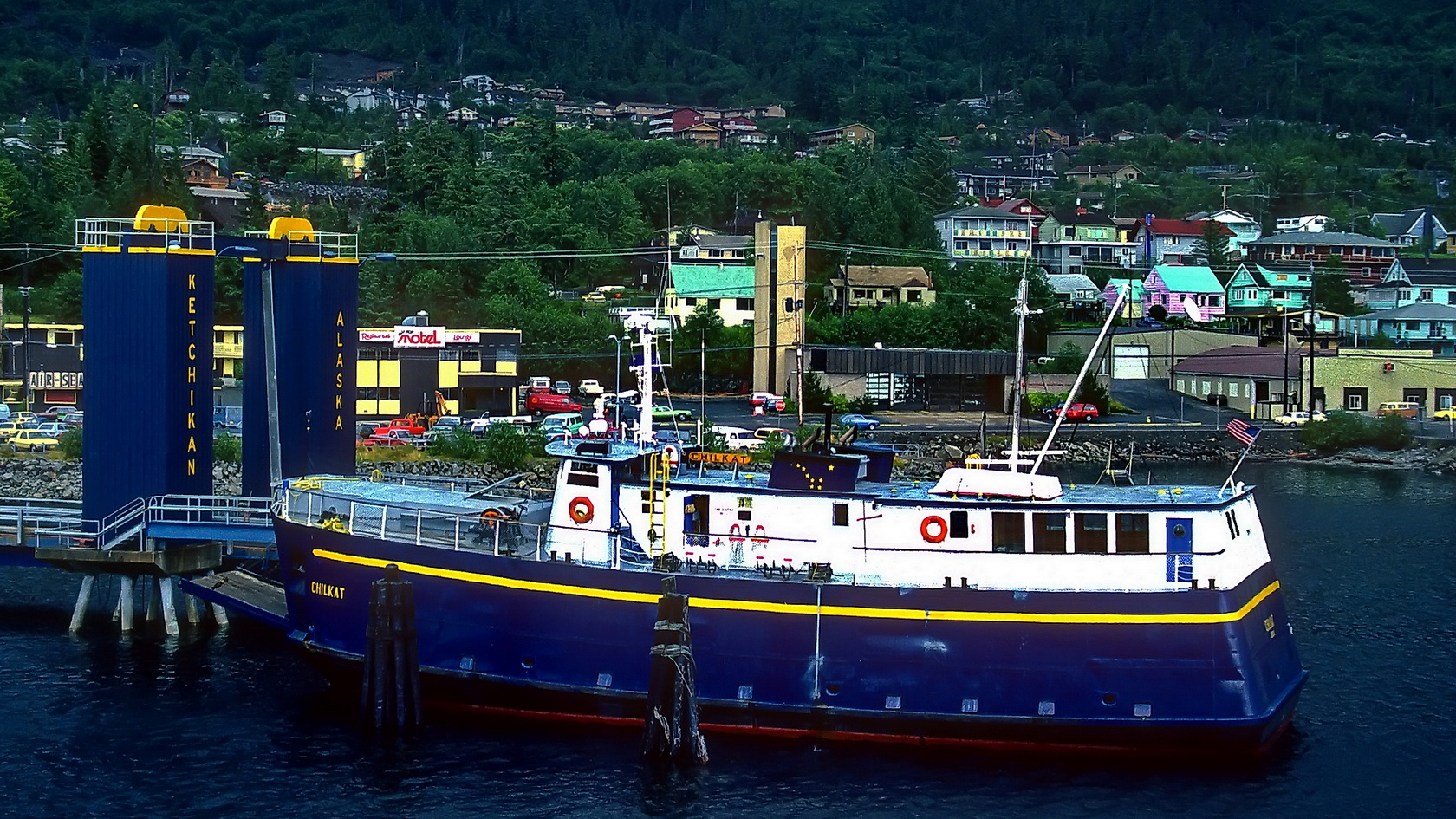
- M/V Chilkat

History
- Name: Chilkat
- Owner: Alaska Marine Highway System
- Port of registry: United States
- Builder: J.M. Martinac Shipbuilding Company
- Cost: $300,000
- Launched: 1957
- Decommissioned: 1988
- Out of service: 2021
- Fate: Sank January 13, 2021, raised January 28, 2021

General characteristics
- Length: 99 ft (30 m)
- Ramps: Bow
- Capacity: 59 passengers; 15 vehicles

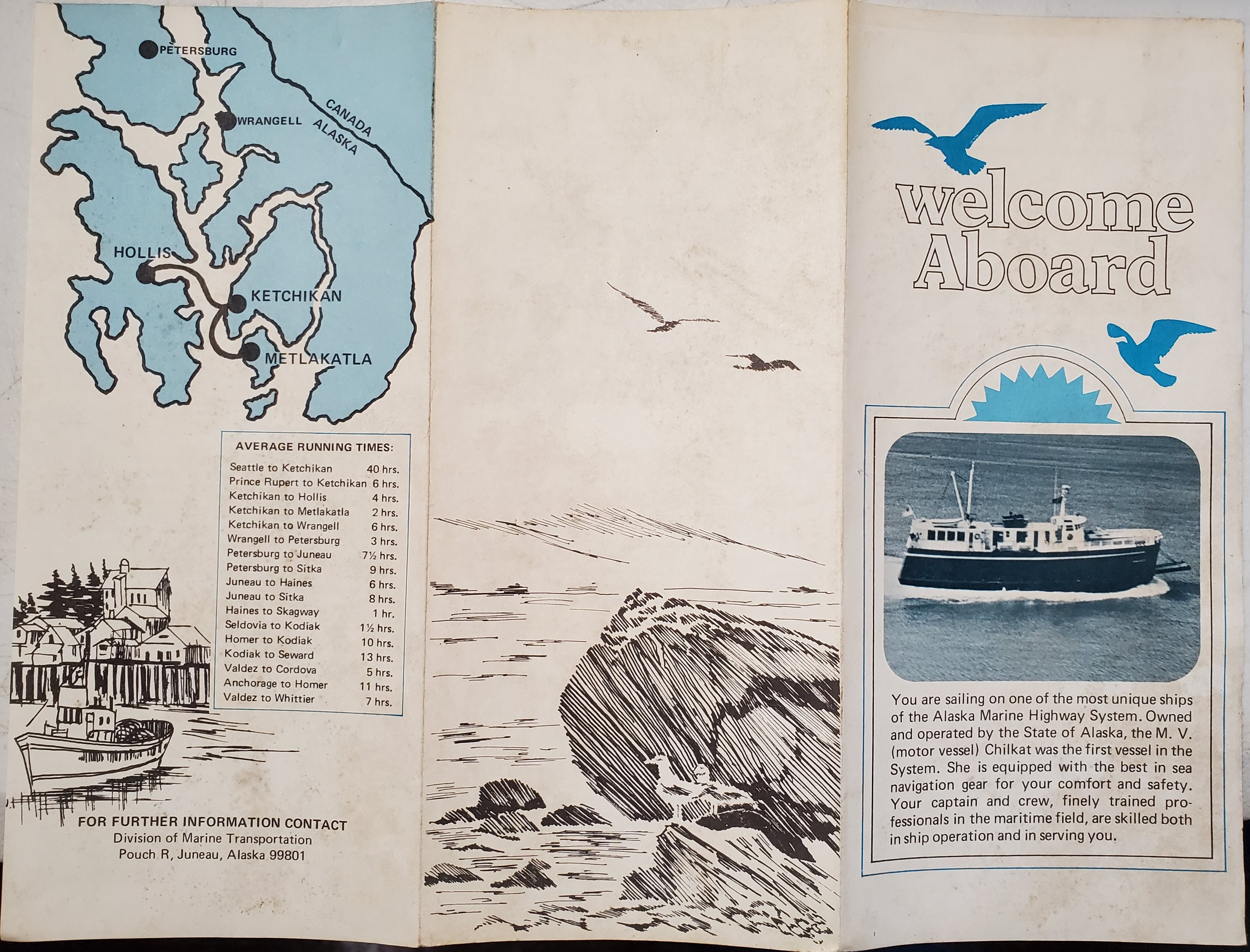
Original Welcome Aboard brochure from the Chilkat. Front.

The M/V Chilkat was the first ferry purpose built for what was to become the Alaska Marine Highway. Originally built to serve the Lynn Canal out of Juneau, she was built with a bow ramp that allowed her 59 passengers and 15 vehicles to offload on an unimproved beach as well as a dock.

== History ==
In 1948, Chilkoot Motorship Lines provided ferry service between Haines and Juneau using the M/V Chilkoot, a surplus WWII landing craft. The line provided weekly service carrying up to 14 vehicles with limited passenger accommodations. The cost of operating a single vessel proved too great for the company, and in 1951 they sold their assets to the Alaska Territorial Board of Road Commissioners, who continued to run the Chilkoot.

The needs of the ferry service outgrew the Chilkoot, and the territorial government commissioned the construction of the Chilkat to replace her in 1957. She became the first vessel of the Alaska Marine Highway when it was established in 1963. After breaking loose from her mooring during a severe windstorm on January 13, 2021, she capsized and sank west of the Guemes ferry dock in the Guemes Channel in Anacortes, WA. The vessel had most recently been used as a scallop tender.

== Sale ==
In 1988, the state of Alaska sold the Chilkat for $50,000 to a private party. After that, it served various roles in Alaska's marine industry, hauling various cargoes like fish or even Christmas trees.

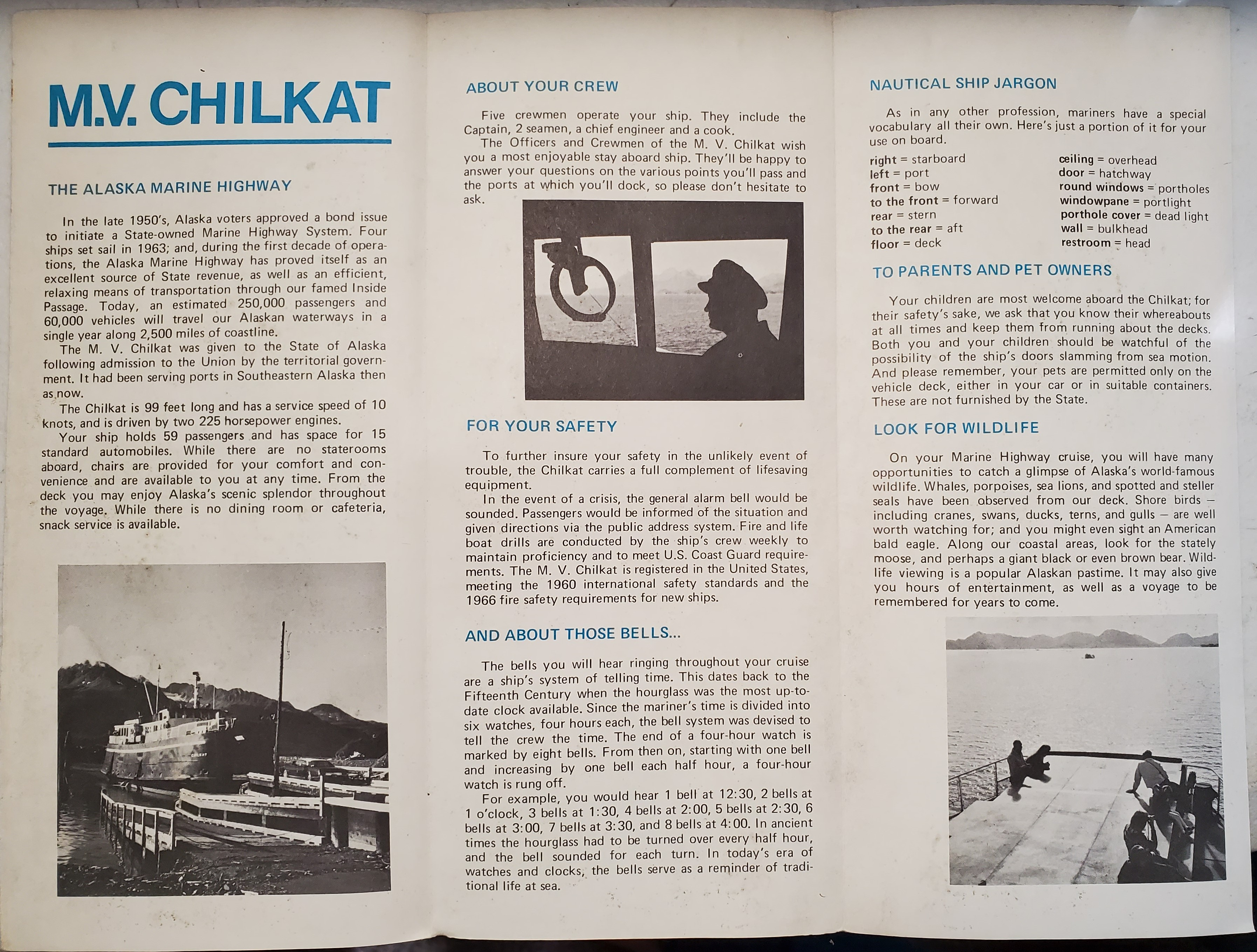
Chilkat Welcome Aboard brochure. Back.

== Island Scallops ==
In 2012, Chilkat was purchased by Island Scallops for use as a scallop tender.
