= MV LeConte =

Ship of the Alaska Marine Highway System,

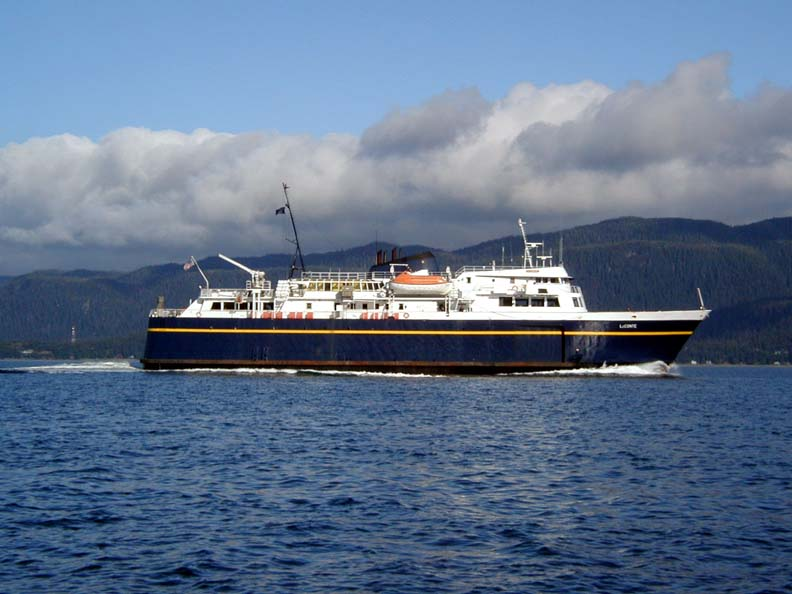
- LeConte heads into Auke Bay in Juneau, Alaska

History
- Name: LeConte
- Namesake: LeConte Glacier near Petersburg, Alaska
- Owner: Alaska Marine Highway System
- Port of registry: United States
- Builder: Peterson Shipbuilders, Sturgeon Bay, Wisconsin
- Launched: 1973
- Commissioned: 1974
- Home port: Juneau, Alaska
- Identification: IMO number: 7318925; MMSI number: 338761000; Callsign: WZE4270
- Status: in active service

General characteristics
- Displacement: 2,132 long tons (2,166 t)
- Length: 235 ft (72 m)
- Beam: 57 ft (17 m)
- Draft: 13 ft 11 in (4.24 m)
- Ramps: Aft, port, and starboard ro-ro loading
- Installed power: Two Caterpillar 3412, rated for 467kW at 1800rpm; One Seattle Boiler SDW50M, two drum, D-type, rated 150 psi (1,034 kPa)
- Propulsion: Two EMD 645F7B 2,550 hp (1,902 kW) each 4,300 hp (3,207 kW)SHP
- Speed: 14.5 knots (26.9 km/h; 16.7 mph)
- Boats & landing craft carried: Two life boats and Two Life Rafts
- Capacity: 250 passengers; 34 automobiles
- Crew: 24 Billets

MV LeConte (/ləˈkɒnteɪ/ lə-KON-tay) is a feeder vessel for the Alaska Marine Highway System, built in Sturgeon Bay, Wisconsin in 1973 and commissioned in 1974 by Alaska's ferry system. LeConte is the older sister ship to M/V Aurora, and both serve as feeder vessels that pick up passengers in small communities such as Hoonah and take them to larger regional communities (this process is colloquially known as the "milk run").

The LeConte primarily serves the northern portion of the Alaskan Panhandle in between Sitka and Juneau, but also occasionally ventures into Southeast Alaska as well. In a highly controversial and political change, however, the LeConte was turned into a day boat operated exclusively out of Juneau. This change cut service to the community of Pelican and to the hub of Sitka — home of the Southeast Alaska Regional Health Center, a hospital that solely serves the Native Alaskan community, the primary demographic of the Leconte's ports of call.

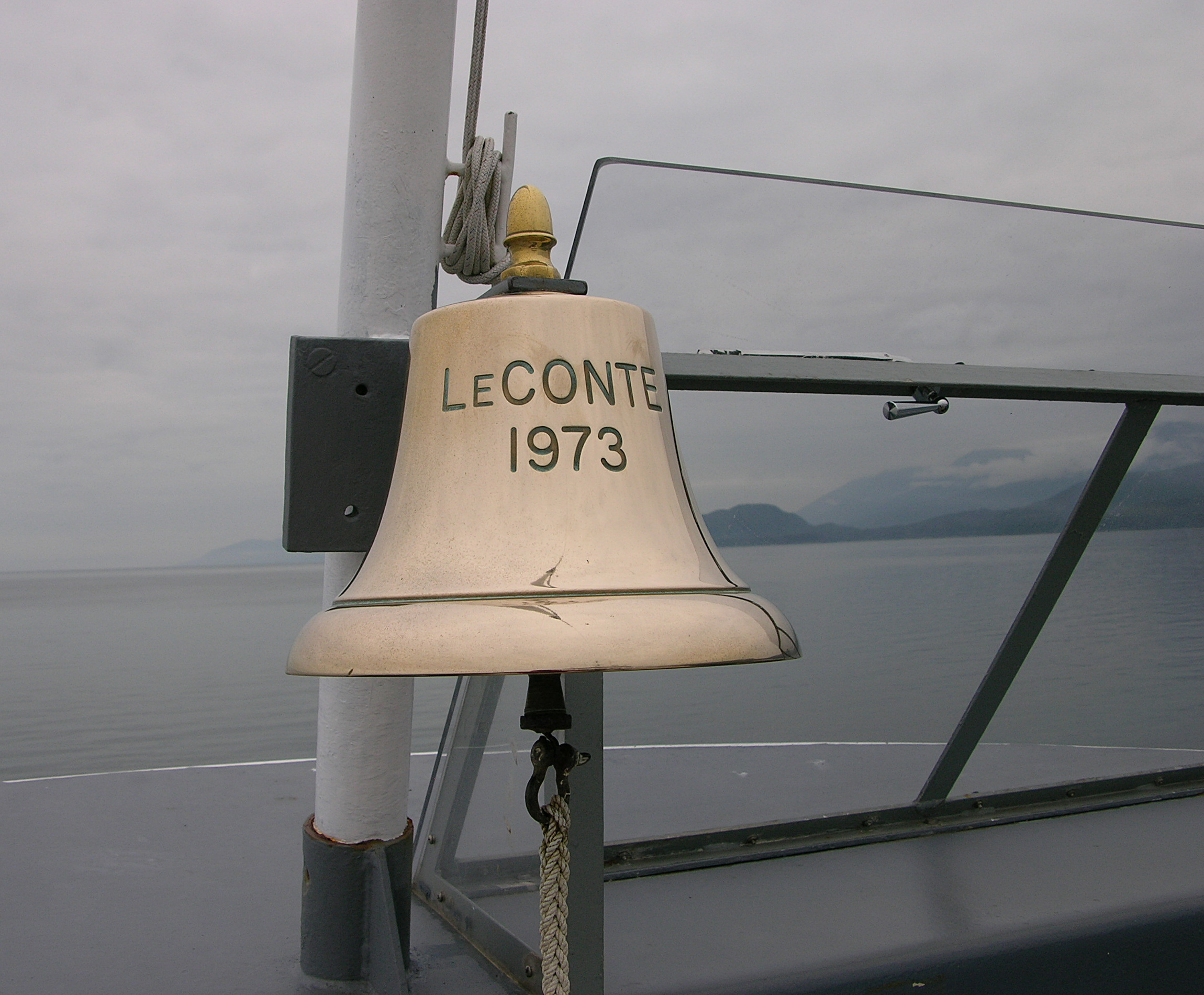
The ship's bell, located at the front of the ship.

In the summer of 2005, the LeConte made a number of stops in Bartlett Cove, which is one of the gateways of Glacier Bay National Park.

The LeConte's amenities include a hot-food cafeteria, movie and forward observation lounges, and solarium. There are no cabins on the LeConte both because of its small size and the lack of demand due to its feeder route running times.

The LeConte and the M/V Aurora are the only AMHS vessels able to serve the communities of Angoon, Pelican, Tenakee Springs, Hoonah and Kake. These vessels' small sizes make them both vital assets for the ferry system and the residents of these rural villages.

== Grounding ==
On May 10, 2004, the M/V LeConte nearly sank after running aground on Cozian Reef in Peril Strait en route to Sitka. Eighty-six passengers and 23 crew were on board at the time and all safely evacuated the ship upon grounding. After a Coast Guard response, passengers were evacuated via life rafts to nearby good samaritan vessels — most of them picked up by the National Oceanic and Atmospheric Administration fishery research vessel John N. Cobb — to be taken to Sitka and booms were laid out to encircle the stranded, empty vessel. Soon after, 23,000 gallons of fuel were pumped out of the fuel tanks and cars were transferred to a landing craft in an elaborate procedure. A salvage operation then began and the vessel was successfully escorted to Ketchikan's Alaska Ship and Dry Dock for repairs under tow after temporary patches were put onto the expansive gashes that compromised five separate compartments of the hull — enough to have sunk the ship had it been lifted off its perch on the reef. Only minor injuries were suffered and only during the evacuation of the boat. The LeConte has now been repaired and is back in service. It is widely agreed a more dire emergency could have resulted had the weather not been so accommodating during the entire salvage process, especially in light of the fact that the LeConte was already listing ten degrees and the tides in Peril Strait were already making the situation highly precarious.

After assessing the circumstances of the grounding, it was concluded operator error caused the incident (not the notorious tidal currents that Peril Strait is known for) and those in command of the vessel were fired from the ferry system.
