= Alaska Marine Highway =

Ferry system serving the U.S. state of Alaska

Alaska Marine Highway System

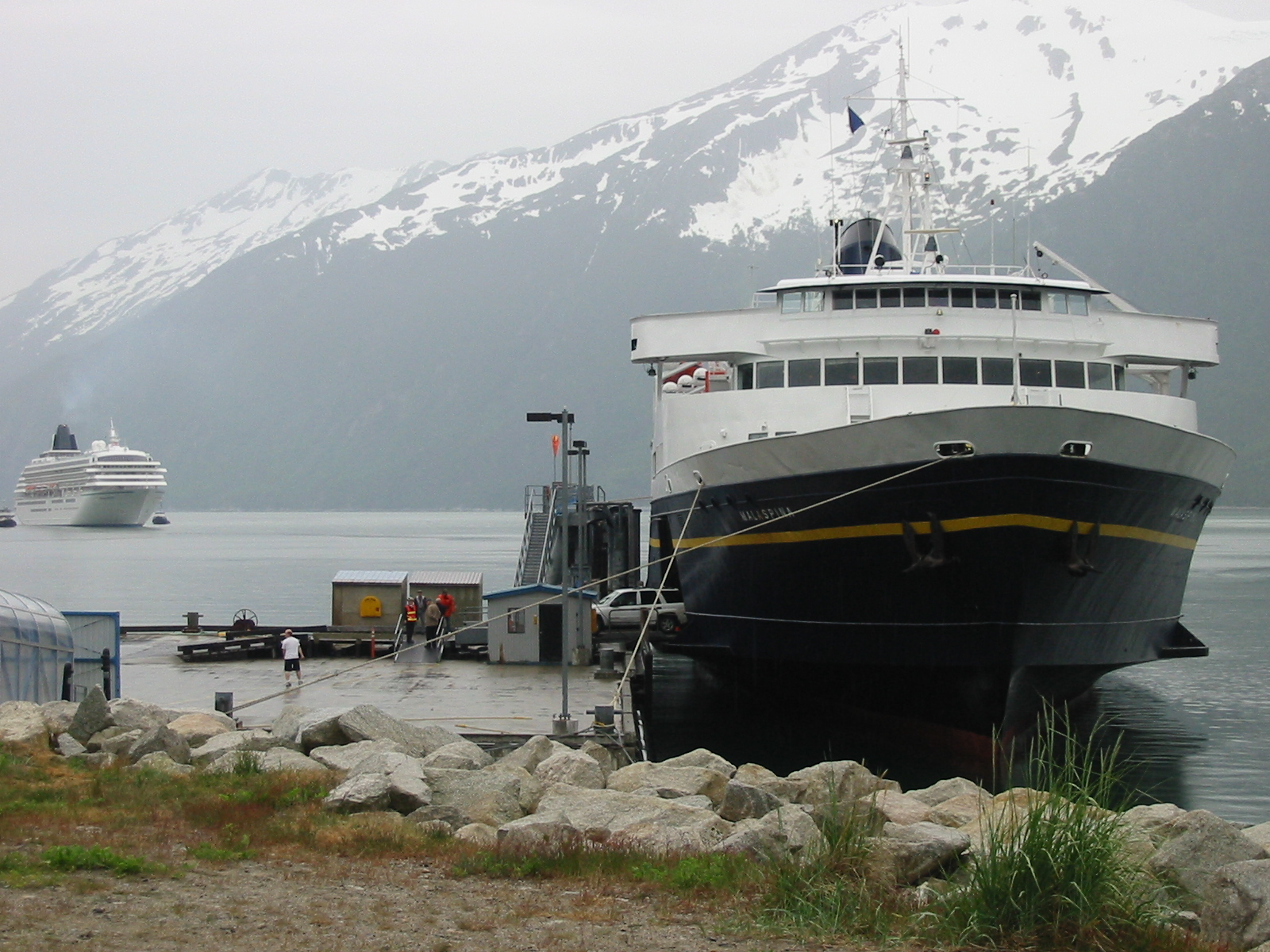
- The MV Malaspina at port in Skagway, Alaska
- Locale: Aleutian Islands to Bellingham, WA
- Began operation: First founded in 1949. Officially designated in 1963.
- Yearly ridership: 350,000
- Yearly vehicles: 100,000
- Website: dot.alaska.gov/amhs/

The Alaska Marine Highway (AMH) or the Alaska Marine Highway System (AMHS) is a ferry service operated by the U.S. state of Alaska. It has its headquarters in Ketchikan, Alaska. AMHS is part of Alaska Department of Transportation and Public Facilities.

The Alaska Marine Highway System operates along the south-central coast of the state, the eastern Aleutian Islands and the Inside Passage of Alaska and British Columbia, Canada. Ferries serve communities in Southeast Alaska that have no road access, and the vessels can transport people, freight, and vehicles. AMHS's 3,500 miles (5,600 km) of routes go as far south as Bellingham, Washington, in the contiguous United States and as far west as Unalaska/Dutch Harbor, with a total of 32 terminals throughout Alaska, British Columbia, and Washington. It is part of the National Highway System and receives federal highway funding. It is also one of the only methods of transporting vehicles between the state and the contiguous United States not requiring international customs and immigration.

The Alaska Marine Highway System is a rare example in the U.S. of a shipping line offering regularly scheduled service for the primary purpose of transportation of passengers rather than of leisure or entertainment. Voyages can last many days, but, in contrast to the luxury of a typical cruise line, cabins cost extra, and most food is served cafeteria-style.

== History ==
=== Pre-statehood ===
The forerunner to the Alaska Marine Highway was the Chilkoot Motorship Lines, founded in 1948 by Haines residents Steve Homer and Ray Gelotte. The company used a converted LCT-Mark VI landing craft, christened the MV Chilkoot. They operated a weekly service from Tee Harbor (north of Juneau) to Haines and Skagway, connecting the territorial capital to the international road system. The Chilkoot Motorship Lines was purchased by the territorial government, and moved under the Territorial Board of Road Commissioners in 1951. In 1957, the MV Chillkoot was replaced by the MV Chilkat, which remained a part of the system until being decommissioned in 1988.

=== A state ferry system ===
In 1959, the year Alaska became a state, voters approved an $18 million ($199 million today) bond package to improve the ferry system throughout the Southeast and Southcentral regions. The package included 4 new vessels and new docks throughout. The first of these new vessels built was the MV Malaspina, followed closely by the MV Matanuska and MV Taku. With 3 new ships, and a new name, the Alaska Marine Highway System (AMHS) was born.

The following year, the ocean-certified MV Tustumena was completed, the Chilkat moved to Prince William Sound, and the AMHS started service in Southcentral. In 1969, that service was expanded with the addition of the MV E.L. Bartlett, in service with the state until 2004.

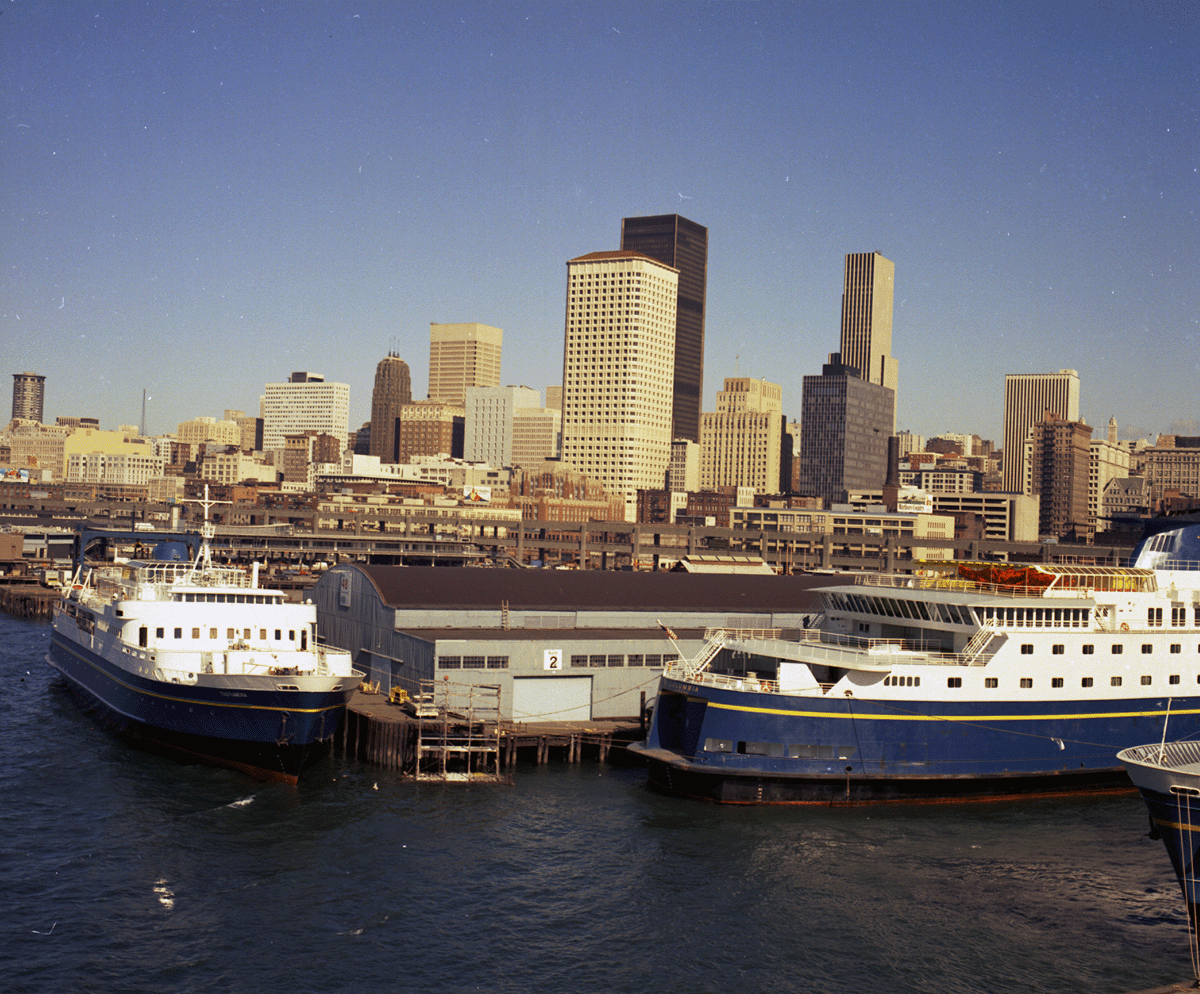
AMHS vessels docked at Pier 48 in Seattle, 1975

=== Farther south ===
In 1967, two events acted to severely restrict transportation to and from Southeast Alaska. A slide took out the Alaska Highway to the North, and BC Ferries' Queen of Prince Rupert ran aground, severely limiting transfer passengers' ability to move between the AMHS Southern terminus of Prince Rupert, British Columbia to Seattle. Until this time, portions of the passage between Southeast Alaska and Washington State were classified as outside waters, and none of the vessels the AMHS operated in Southeast Alaska had the necessary ocean-going certification required to carry passengers on outside waters. Citing the need for a transportation link between Alaska and the rest of the United States, then governor Wally Hickel ordered the AMHS to send a vessel south to Seattle while putting a request to Congress to re-classify the route as inside waters. The federal government agreed to do so, which left the AMHS with a significantly longer route system, and no new vessels to serve it.

Faced with the lengthy construction time and cost of building a new vessel, the AMHS looked abroad to find a quicker solution. The Stena Britannica, just a year old, was purchased and rechristened the MV Wickersham. While the Wickersham was relatively inexpensive to purchase, and could be added to the system quickly, she was never re-flagged as an American ship, and so commercial operation between US ports of call was a violation of the Merchant Marine Act of 1920 (commonly known as the Jones Act). Initially, the State of Alaska had felt they would be able to get a waiver of the Jones Act for the Wickersham, but that request was blocked, severely limiting the scheduling flexibility of the ship. While the Wickersham could pick up passengers in Washington State and deliver them to Alaska if there were an intermediary stop in Canada, moving passengers within Alaska was not allowed. Additionally, as the Wickersham was not specifically built for Alaskan ports, she was limited as to which ports she could dock at. The AMHS ordered the new construction of the MV Columbia, which replaced the Wickersham on the mainline Seattle route in 1974.

The southern terminus of the AMHS remained in Seattle until October 1989, when it moved to the Bellingham Cruise Terminal in Fairhaven, Washington, after signing a 20-year lease with the city of Bellingham.

=== Feeder service ===
Facing the need to increase capacity, both the Matanuska and Malaspina were stretched by 56 feet, beyond the capacity of some of the smaller harbors and leaving the Taku as the only AMHS ship in Southeast able to serve some of the smaller communities. To serve the smaller communities of Southeast, the AMHS ordered the MV LeConte in 1974 and the MV Aurora in 1978. These would be the last new ships built for the AMHS for 20 years, ending the initial construction of the AMHS.

=== Exxon Valdez oil spill ===
On March 24, 1989, the Exxon Valdez struck Bligh Reef in Prince William Sound. The State of Alaska's on scene response was managed from the E.L. Bartlett, later relieved by the Aurora. Suction trucks were placed in the car-deck, temporarily converting the ferry into a spill response vessel. The State of Alaska determined a new vessel was necessary, and the new vessel should be designed from the beginning to be able to take on a command and control role in the case of another disaster. Funded in part by settlement money from Exxon, the MV Kennicott joined the system in 1998.

=== Day boats ===
New construction since the Kennicott has focused on day boats, which can run their expected schedule and return home within a 12-hour shift.

In 2004, the MV Lituya was added to the fleet to make the 16.5-nautical-mile (30.6 km) trip between Ketchikan and Metlakatla in Southeast. With a design heavily influenced by oil rig supply vessels, she is unique among the fleet with an open car deck and limited passenger facilities. Costing only $9.5 million ($16 million today), her low fuel consumption and small crew complement make her the most economical vessel in the fleet, giving the AMHS real-world data on the effectiveness of small, short-haul ferries in Southeast waters.

=== Labor strike ===
In 2019, a labor strike involving over 400 members of the Inlandboatman's Union of the Pacific shut down the AMH for several days between July 24 and August 2. This strike, the first one the AMH had seen in 42 years, led to a $3.2 million loss in revenue and reimbursements and was resolved with federal mediation.

== Routes ==
Map showing the Alaska Marine Highway System

=== Southeast Alaska ===
The southeast AMHS route system is divided into two subsystems: the mainline routes which typically take more than one day for the ship to travel; and shorter routes where the vessels depart their home port in the morning, travel to destination ports and then return to their home port on the same day. The shorter routes are commonly referred to as "day boat" routes.

The mainline routes carry a high percentage of tourists in the summer, and provide service between Bellingham, Washington, or Prince Rupert, British Columbia, and Skagway, Alaska. Along the way, the ships stop in Ketchikan, Wrangell, Petersburg, Sitka, Juneau, and Haines. The smaller communities Kake and Hoonah are served by certain mainline sailings. During 2008, the five largest AMHS vessels were used on the Southeast mainline routes. These were the MV Columbia, MV Kennicott, MV Malaspina, MV Matanuska, and the MV Taku.

In the past, day boat service was also provided on the North Lynn Canal route during the peak summer season by MV Malaspina. This route provides round-trip service between Juneau, Haines and Skagway. The day boat routes connect the smaller communities of Southeast Alaska with each other and with the Southeast Alaska mainline communities (Ketchikan, Petersburg, Wrangell, Sitka, Juneau, Haines and Skagway) that serve as regional centers for commerce, government health services, and/or connections to other transportation systems. The day boat routes primarily serve local residents, and include Angoon, Hoonah, Kake, Metlakatla, Pelican, and Tenakee.

In 2008, three AMHS vessels provided service on the day boat routes. These were the MV LeConte, the MV Fairweather and the MV Lituya. The MV Lituya is dedicated to providing day boat service between Ketchikan and Metlakatla. The Southeast System connects with the continental road system at Bellingham, Washington, Prince Rupert, British Columbia, and in Alaska at Haines and Skagway.

=== Cross-gulf service ===
When the MV Kennicott, a vessel certified to operate in open waters, joined the fleet in the summer 1998 the ferry system expanded to include regular cross-gulf sailings. Also known as "inter-tie trips", these sailings connect Southeastern Alaska with Southcentral and Southwest regions of the state. All cross-gulf trips include a stop at the port of Yakutat, a community unique in that it is served only on a cross-gulf route. During 2008, the AMHS provided Yakutat with 10 port calls.

In recent years, the frequency of cross-gulf trips have diminished as a result of staffing and funding issues. There have been many years when no cross-gulf service was offered at all. Consequentially Yakutat has seen significantly less service.

=== Southwest Alaska ===
The Southwest system serves Prince William Sound, Kodiak Island, the Alaska Peninsula, and the Aleutian Islands. The MV Tustumena provides regular service between Kodiak, Port Lions, Seldovia and Homer. In 2008, between April and October, the MV Tustumena traveled out the Aleutian chain once a month to Unalaska/Dutch Harbor, stopping at Chignik, Sand Point, King Cove, False Pass, Akutan and Cold Bay. This trip is not made in the winter because of adverse weather conditions. In 2008 service in Prince William Sound to Valdez, Cordova and Whittier was provided by the MV Aurora. The MV Chenega provided additional service during the summer season, and the MV Kennicott provided supplemental service. AMHS also provided fifty-five stops in the village of Tatitlek and thirty-six stops in Chenega Bay. Tourist passengers add a significant percentage to the Prince William Sound traffic in the summer, especially between Valdez and Whittier. In the winter months when traffic demand was significantly reduced and weather conditions worsened, the MV Chenega was moved to North Lynn Canal to replace the Fairweather for its overhaul period. The MV Tustumena also underwent a CIP project, leaving the MV Aurora to provide service between the ports.

== Communities served ==
The Alaska Marine Highway's main hub is in Juneau, though administrative offices are in Ketchikan. Other smaller operational hubs include Cordova (Prince William Sound), Ketchikan (southern Panhandle), and Kodiak (Southcentral Alaska).

The AMHS serves the following communities year-round:

- Akutan
- Angoon
- Bellingham, Washington
- Chenega Bay
- Chignik
- Cold Bay
- Cordova
- False Pass
- Gustavus
- Haines
- Homer
- Hoonah
- Juneau
- Kake
- Ketchikan
- King Cove
- Kodiak
- Metlakatla
- Ouzinkie
- Petersburg
- Port Lions
- Prince Rupert, British Columbia
- Sand Point
- Seldovia
- Sitka
- Skagway
- Tatitlek
- Tenakee Springs
- Unalaska/Dutch Harbor
- Valdez
- Whittier
- Wrangell
- Yakutat

== Current vessels ==
The following vessels, from smallest to largest, currently serve in the Alaska Marine Highway's fleet:

- MV Lituya, solely dedicated to serving the Ketchikan-Annette Bay route, which includes the city of Metlakatla.
- MV Aurora operates in Prince William Sound.
- MV LeConte serves the feeder communities in the northern Southeast as a day boat.
- MV Tazlina, the first Alaska-Class vessel and the first AMHS ship to be built in Alaska.
- MV Hubbard, the second Alaska-Class vessel.
- MV Tustumena, serves Southcentral and Aleutian Island communities.
- MV Columbia, runs mainline throughout Southeast Alaska, usually beginning in Bellingham.
- MV Matanuska, While not retired, the MV Matanuska hasn't ferried passengers since 2023 and is currently being used as a "hotel ship" for AMHS personnel. In March of 2026, the State of Alaska announced that they are looking for options to retire the MV Matanuska.
- MV Kennicott, runs mainline throughout Southeast Alaska, usually starting in Bellingham. Occasionally, the vessel will go cross-gulf to Southcentral Alaska. However, due to personnel and funding shortages, this has become a much less frequent route.

Many Alaska Marine Highway System vessels are built for multiple-day voyages due to the large distances between ports. For example, it takes just under three days to travel from Bellingham to Skagway, and 18 hours for Sitka to Juneau. Because of this, larger vessels (MV Tustumena and larger) come with staterooms, while all mainline vessels have solariums, showers, and lounges for sleeping. Hot food services and, on the MV Columbia and MV Tustumena, sit-down service is also offered.

In July 2011 the Marine Highway began the bidding process to build the first of what they refer to as "Alaska-Class Vessels", made to travel shorter routes. They would not have staterooms available for passengers. One hundred-twenty million dollars were set aside for the project, and the future ships names were selected from a contest amongst Alaska students. The first ferry named the MV Tazlina was delivered in August 2018 by the Vigor Shipyard in Ketchikan, AK, and the MV Hubbard was launched in June 2023.

All current vessels are named after Alaskan glaciers, as per state law.

== Retired vessels ==
In addition to the current fleet, the following vessels have been retired:

- MV Bartlett
- MV Chilkat
- MV Chilkoot
- MV Taku
- MV Wickersham
- MV Chenega (fast ferry) had been laid up in Seattle, Washington, Lake Washington Ship Canal, due to service reductions. Has been sold to the Spanish company Trasmapi as of 2021.
- MV Fairweather (fast ferry) operated a variety of routes in Southeast Alaska. Has been sold to the Spanish company Trasmapi as of 2021.
- MV Malaspina

== Traffic ==
The AMHS carries around 350,000 passengers and 100,000 vehicles every year. In their 2008 Annual Traffic Volume Report, the Alaska Marine Highway reported moving 340,412 passengers and 109,839 vehicles; equating to the highest passenger ridership in eight years and the highest vehicle ridership in sixteen. The Ferry is very popular with summer tourists (one of the primary reasons Bellingham and Prince Rupert are AMHS destinations). Tent cities commonly sprout up on the aft of mainline vessels, and for budget travellers, the AMHS is one of the top modes of transportation to the "Last Frontier". Service drops off significantly in winter. Vessels usually undergo overhauls and renovations during this period due to the decline in passenger and vehicle traffic (attributed to a lack of tourists).

== See also ==
- BC Ferries, British Columbia's ferry system, similar to the Alaska Marine Highway
- Inter-Island Ferry Authority, southeast Alaskan ferry system that operates out of Prince of Wales Island
- Puget Sound Navigation Company, a private company connecting Washington and British Columbia
- Washington State Ferries, state-operated ferry system serving Puget Sound, the San Juan Islands and Sidney, British Columbia

Together, these services cover the length of the Inside Passage. They connect at a number of locations.
