= Pacific Salmon War =

1990s fishing dispute between American and Canadian fishers

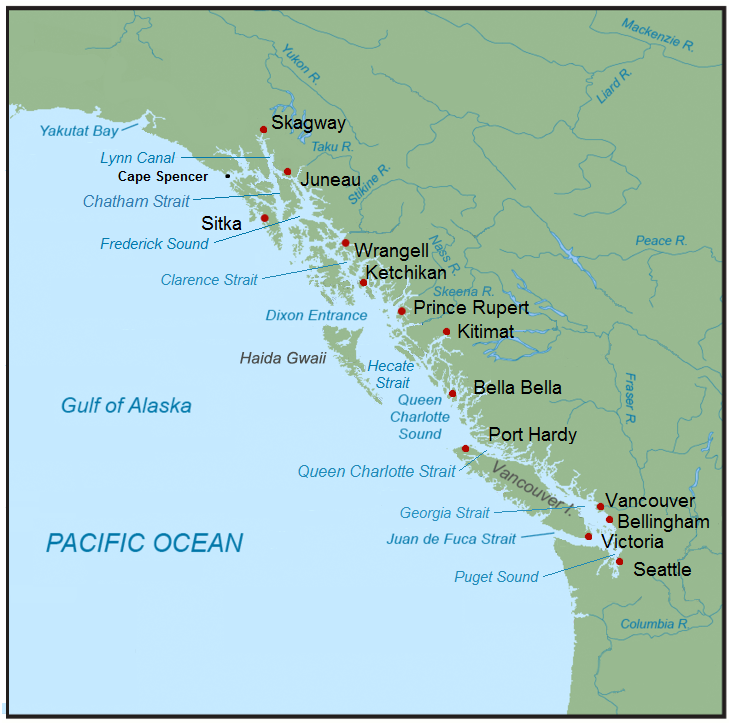
- Major waterways and cities in the region where the 'Pacific Salmon War' took place
Date	1992–1999 (formally concluded 3 June 2001)
Location	Coastal waters off British Columbia, Alaska and Washington; Prince Rupert
Result	Canadian victory: Pacific Salmon Treaty amended in 1999

Belligerents
Canada	United States

Commanders and leaders
(Canada) Jean Chrétien; (Canada) Brian Tobin; (Canada) David Anderson; (Canada) Glen Clark; (Canada) David Strangway	(United States) Bill Clinton; (United States) William Ruckelshaus; (United States) Tony Knowles; (United States) Frank Murkowski; (United States) Gary Locke

Units involved
Fisheries and Oceans Canada	

Casualties and losses
(Canada) None	(United States) 5 vessels seized

The Pacific Salmon War was a period of heightened tensions between Canada and the United States over the Pacific salmon catch. It began in 1992 after the first Pacific Salmon Treaty, which had been ratified in 1985, expired, and lasted until a new agreement was signed in 1999. Disagreements were high in 1994, when a transit fee was set on American fishing vessels using the Inside Passage and a ferry was blockaded by fishing boats in Friday Harbor, Washington.

Tensions peaked in 1997, when Canadian fishers, pursuing a "Canada First" strategy, began catching as many salmon as they could. After aggressive tacks on both sides, Alaskan fishers were granted free rein to fish for 56 hours around Noyes Island. In retaliation, a flotilla consisting of between 100 and 200 Canadian fishing boats surrounded the Alaskan ferry MV Malaspina in the port of Prince Rupert, British Columbia, for three days. Heightened tensions continued for the rest of the fishing season, with Premier Glen Clark of British Columbia threatening to close the Canadian Forces Maritime Experimental and Test Ranges (CFMETR) in Nanoose Bay. Alaskan ferry services to Prince Rupert were halted.

Disagreements were largely resolved by 1999, although court cases continued until a new agreement was signed on June 3, 2001.

== Background ==
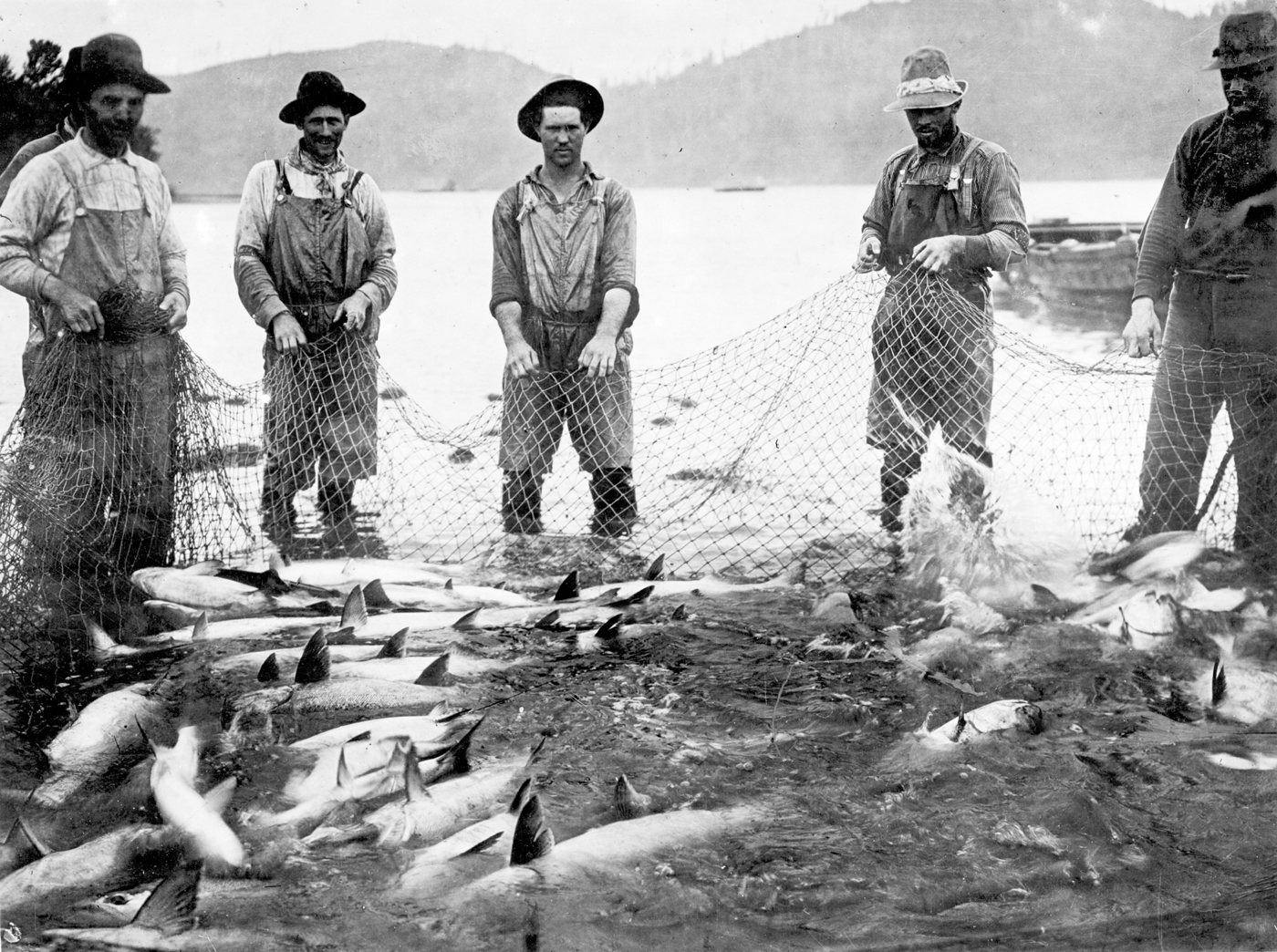
Seining salmon on the Columbia River, 1914

Pacific salmon have been an important food source and trade commodity for Northwest First Nations peoples for millennia. After European explorers arrived, the first large-scale commercial salmon fisheries were started in the early 1800s. Lucrative fisheries were established on the Columbia and Fraser rivers, including canneries geared for export. Harvests increased annually until the 1910s. The abundance of the resource had precluded any disagreements between the Canadian and American governments until this point.

However, from the 1920s, stocks began to decline, a result of over-fishing and the degradation and obstruction of migratory rivers. Competition between American and Canadian fisheries for the dwindling resource led to conflict. Disputes were complicated by the fact that the salmon crossed several international borders during their lifespan. In 1930, the governments met and proposed the Fraser River Convention to regulate fishing and mitigate environmental damage to salmon habitats. The International Pacific Salmon Fisheries Commission was formally founded in 1937.

By the 1970s, cooperation between the two governments in setting fishing quotas had faltered. In 1982, after 14 or 15 years of negotiations, a comprehensive treaty known as the Pacific Salmon Treaty was signed and was fully ratified in 1985. It limited catches of Alaska, Fraser, and Columbia salmon to pre-set quotas and committed the governments to improving the spawning capacities of the region's rivers. The treaty had two main purposes: to "prevent overfishing and provide for optimum production" of salmon and to "provide for each Party to receive benefits equivalent to the production of salmon originating in its waters." Though the treaty was generally successful at increasing fish populations, it failed to prevent large amounts of 'interceptions', or fish being caught disproportionately by one country. In 1999, Karon de Zwager Brown calculated that the US had intercepted 35 million more salmon than Canada since 1985. The disagreements were exacerbated by the fact that American salmon production was going down and Canadian stocks were increasing, resulting in a disproportionate number of American interceptions.

In 1992 the treaty expired. 1993 was the last year both countries agreed on fishing limits. Regulations regarding how many fish could be caught ended in 1994.

== Conflict ==
In May 1994, negotiations over a new treaty collapsed. The following month, the AP wrote that "The opening shots in what some people are calling an international 'fish war' could be fired by the Canadian government Thursday." The same month, the Associated Press quoted Minister of Fisheries Oceans Brian Tobin as saying, "There will be an aggressive fishing strategy, but no fish war," as Canadian fishers announced a fishing plan that would increase catches of salmon and restrict American fishing in Canadian waters. The plan was deliberately aggressive, intending to "maximize disruption" according to Tobin.

On August 15, a ferry was briefly blockaded by around 12 fishing boats in Friday Harbor, Washington. They were protesting a lack of progress in fishing negotiations. In late August, Canada seized five American ships. On June 9, 1994, Canada announced a C$1500 'transit fee' on fishing boats traveling to Alaska via the Inside Passage. The US argued that the fee was in violation of the law of the sea, which grants "innocent right of passage to vessels through a country's territorial waters." Canada contended that the passage was a waterway. Though it was supported by various Canadians, the fee was suspended after Vice President of the United States Al Gore agreed to further negotiations but not before C$325,000 had been charged to 285 fishing boats. The US reimbursed fishers for the fees.

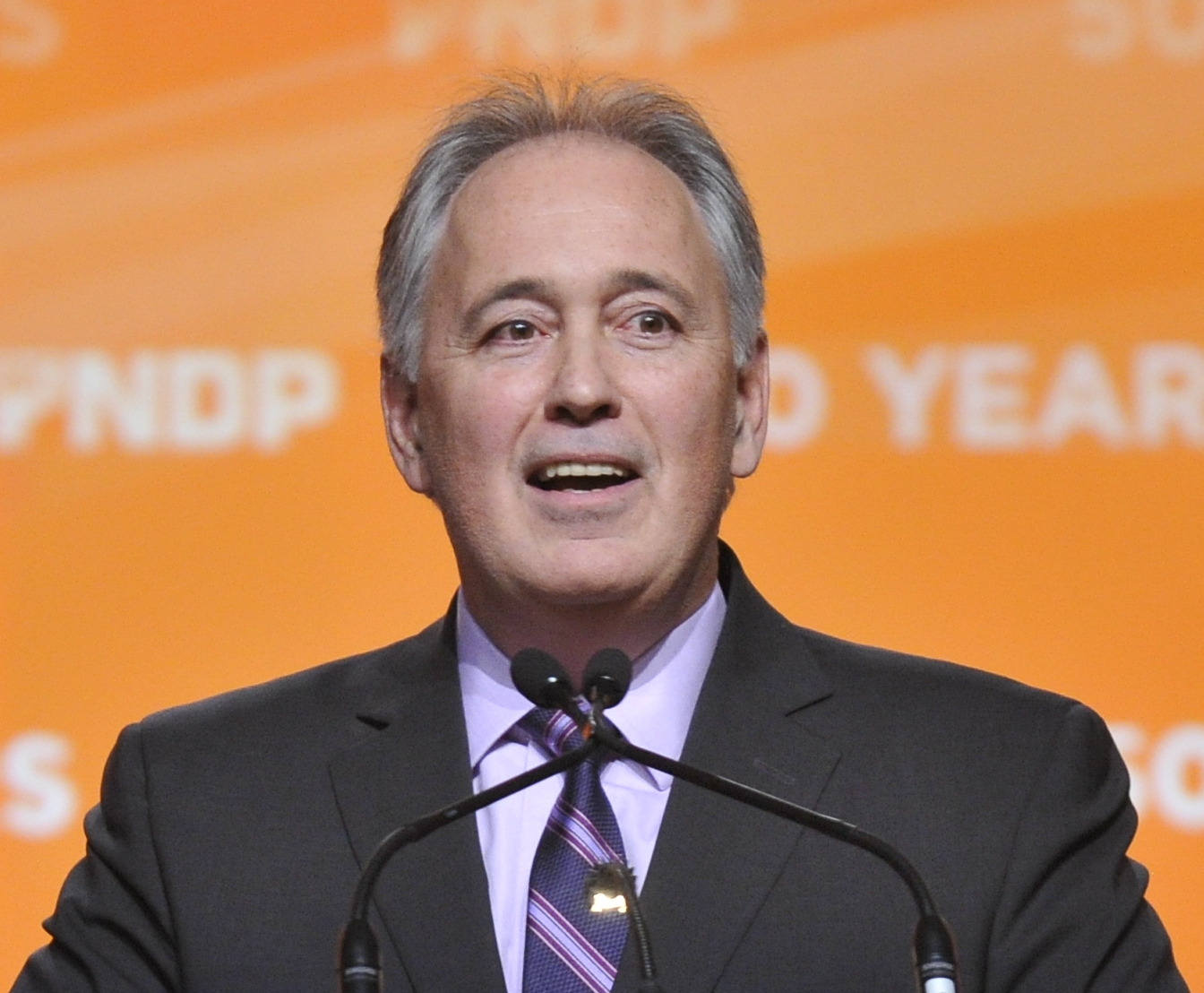
Glen Clark in 2011

Negotiations again failed in 1995 after Alaskan delegates were unwilling to restrict their catch. In June, Al Gore urged Alaskan fishers to lower their catch. On July 9 an Alaskan ferry was prevented from leaving the port of Prince Rupert by Canadian fishers. Later that year, on August 11, a temporary ban on Alaskan fishing of Chinook salmon was put in place by Barbara Rothstein, a senior United States district judge of the United States District Court for the Western District of Washington, after Native American tribes in the region filed a lawsuit. The tribes, Washington state, Oregon, and British Columbia all supported lower Alaskan limits. After the Turbot War between Canada and Spain, Tobin urged outside mediation. In October an attempt at mediation, led by New Zealand diplomat Chris Beeby, began. Beeby determined that the Americans would have to dramatically decrease their catch in order to balance interests of both nations. The United States rejected his conclusions, and 1996 Alaska was accused of placing limits on their fishers that were too high by British Columbia. In 1996, general conservation plans were agreed upon and Canada claimed that the US took 5.3 million more salmon than it was "entitled to". Later that year, Alaska's limits were again called too high. That year, American fishers 'intercepted' 5.3 million salmon.

Discussions begun in February 1997 failed to resolve the disagreement. Canadian fishers resolved to enter the fishing season by adopting a "Canada First" strategy in which they would attempt to catch large amounts of salmon before the salmon reached the Fraser River. As a result, they caught three million, almost ten times the amount caught by American fishers. In June 1997, American fishers caught an estimated 315,000 of the 2.35 million sockeye salmon caught—almost three times their 120,000 average. Canadians alleged that the Americans were targeting the valuable sockeye salmon, which the Americans denied. The "Canada First" policy was equated by the conservationist David Ellis to a "scorched earth" fishing policy, because it threatened salmon stocks.

That same month, four American fishing boats were detained in a port in British Columbia for violating a new law that required all fishing boats to check in with the Canadian Coast Guard and store fishing gear below deck. They were fined and then released. After the incident, American senator Frank H. Murkowski proposed an escort for the boats composed of US Navy or US Coast Guard ships. Two fishermen of the Makah tribe were arrested and fined $4,000 each for illegal fishing by Canadian authorities. Alaskan governor Tony Knowles equated Canadian actions to gunboat diplomacy. During a breakdown in treaty negotiations in early July, a group of around 100 American fishermen were allowed to fish as much as they wanted around Noyes Island for 56 hours. Canadian fishers argued that $50 million to $60 million of fish were taken during that time. Clark was reluctant to give the US Navy permission to operate submarines and canceled a US Canada economic conference.

The US was accused of violating the terms of the Pacific Salmon Treaty on July 18, 1997. On July 19, 1997, a flotilla consisting of between 100 and 200 Canadian fishing boats surrounded the Alaskan ferry MV Malaspina in the port of Prince Rupert, British Columbia, in retaliation for the Noyes Island incident. 328 passengers were trapped aboard the ship and the ship was not allowed to travel to Ketchikan, Alaska, its next stop. A court ordered the boats to move the following day, and they refused and requested to speak to David Anderson, the Canadian Minister of Fisheries. Another ferry boat avoided docking in Prince Rupert and instead went to its next stop, Bellingham, Washington. After three days the Malaspina was released when Anderson ordered the blockade to be lifted. The United States Department of State complained, and the United States Senate condemned Canada for not acting to end the blockade quicker. In response to the blockade, Alaskan ferry services to Prince Rupert were halted, depriving the region of many tourists—a major source of income. Alaska also sued the fishermen for C$2.8 million in lost revenue, and Canadian fishers counter-sued over revenue lost. The halt was extended through the middle of 1998 in September.

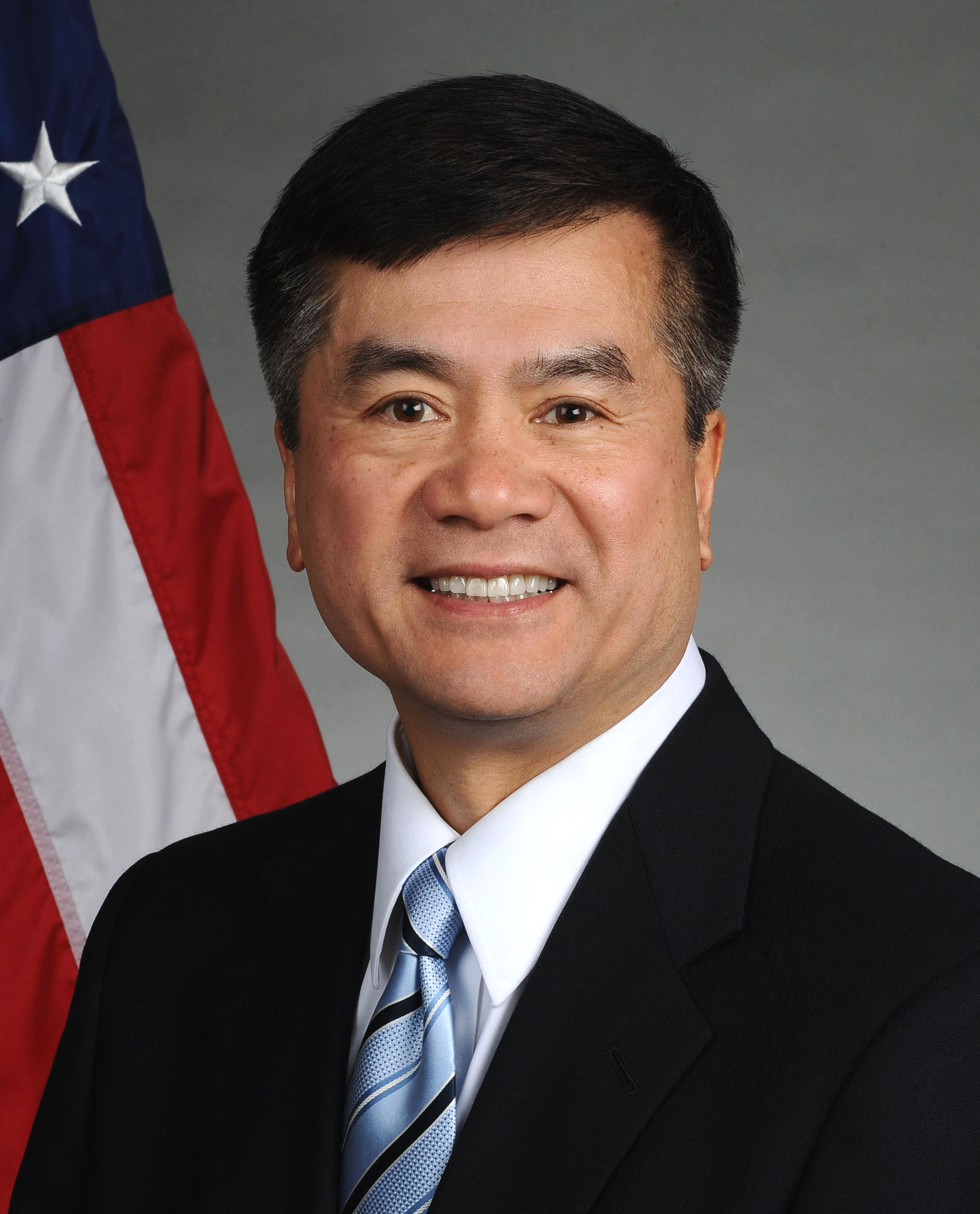
Gary Locke

An American flag was burned in Prince Rupert. Glen Clark, Premier of British Columbia, attempted to close via expropriation or to cancel the lease to CFMETR, Nanoose Bay, a Nanoose Bay torpedo testing site that was leased to the US Navy. The Canadian federal government halted Clark's efforts.

== Resolution ==
In September 1997 in Seattle, Clark filed a lawsuit against the United States, seeking C$325 million in damages and alleging American fishers broke the terms of the treaty. He claimed that Americans were taking 500,000 sockeye salmon, which was four times the Pacific Salmon Treaty's limit. Americans countered that the Canadians were overfishing coho and chinook salmon. Clark was not supported in his suit by the Canadian federal government and called it "treasonous." In October, Raymond Chrétien, the Canadian Ambassador to the United States, wrote in a letter to the US House Natural Resources Committee, "During the last three years, cooperation with the United States on the conservation of chinook salmon has been a major problem." He complained about Alaskan overfishing.

The federal governments quickly became further involved, with William Ruckelshaus appointed by US President Bill Clinton to represent the US and the geologist David Strangway by Canadian Prime Minister Jean Chrétien to represent Canada. Their first report was published on January 12, 1998. On January 22, 1998, Alaska offered to drop the lawsuit in exchange for the counter-suit being dropped and Canada spending C$2.75 million promoting tourism in Cascadia. Clark's case was dismissed on January 30, 1998, and later in 2001 by US District Judge John C. Coughenour. Before the 1999 fishing season, a deal between Alaska, Washington, Oregon, Canada, and various native tribes was signed with new restrictions, and the conflict was essentially ended.

The dispute formally ended June 3, 2001, when the 1985 agreement was revised and signed. Gary Locke, an American negotiator and Governor of Washington State, said on the day that the agreement was signed, "Today we mark an end to the last several years of stalemate... an end to the U.S.-Canada salmon war." Some in Canada felt that Anderson had not pushed enough for a better deal for Canadians.
