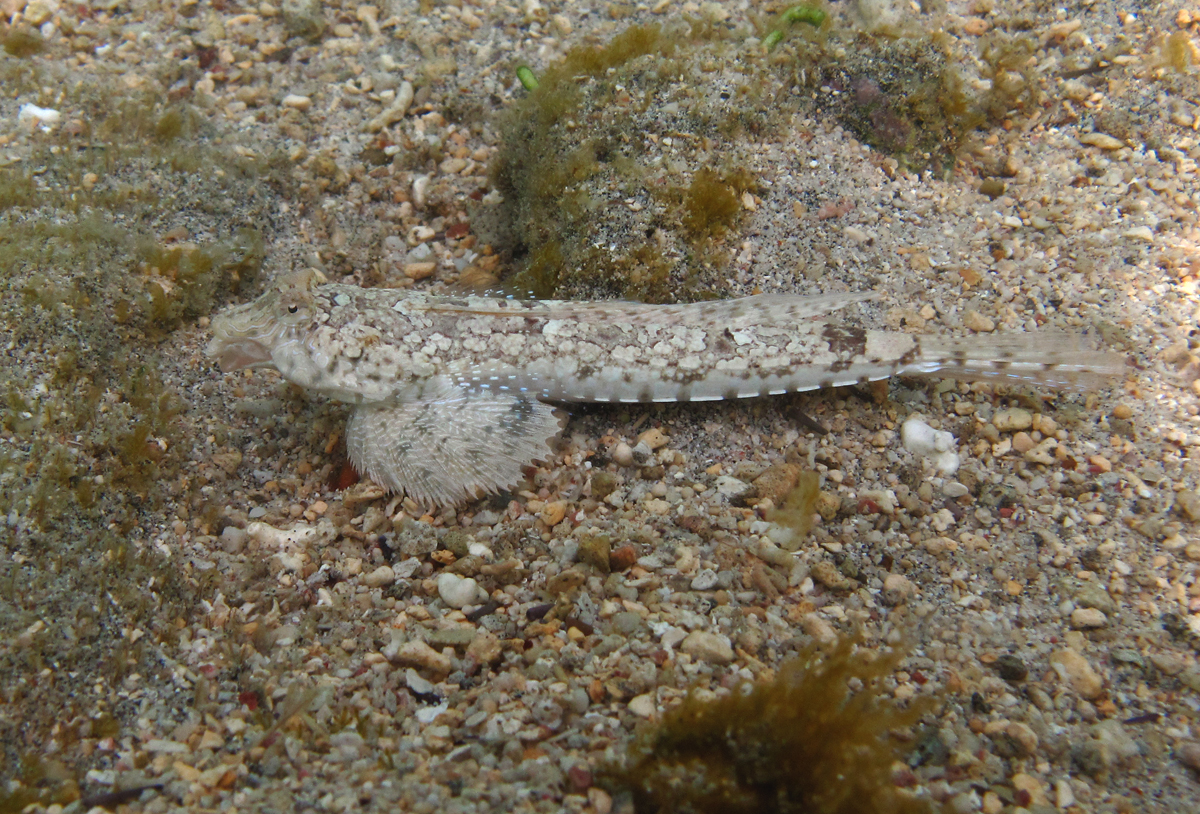
- Diplogrammus infulatus, Réunion

Scientific classification
- Kingdom: Animalia
- Phylum: Chordata
- Class: Actinopterygii
- Order: Syngnathiformes
- Family: Callionymidae
- Genus: Diplogrammus; T. N. Gill, 1865

Type species
- Callionymus goramensis Bleeker, 1858

Synonyms
- Chalinops J. L. B. Smith, 1963

= Diplogrammus =

Genus of fishes

Diplogrammus is a genus of dragonets.

== Species ==
There are currently 8 recognized species in this genus:

- Diplogrammus goramensis (Bleeker, 1858) (Goram dragonet)
- Diplogrammus gruveli J. L. B. Smith, 1963 (Gruvel's dragonet)
- Diplogrammus infulatus J. L. B. Smith, 1963 (Indian Ocean fold dragonet)
- Diplogrammus pauciradiatus (Gill, 1865) (Spotted dragonet)
- Diplogrammus paucispinis R. Fricke & Bogorodsky, 2014 (Saudi Arabian dragonet)
- Diplogrammus pygmaeus R. Fricke, 1981 (Pygmy dragonet)
- Diplogrammus randalli R. Fricke, 1983 (Randall's fold dragonet)
- Diplogrammus xenicus (D. S. Jordan & W. F. Thompson, 1914) (Japanese fold dragonet)

D. pauciradiatus is sometimes placed in its own monotypic genus Chalinops.
