= Red Gap, British Columbia =

Red Gap
- Location of Red Gap in British Columbia
- Coordinates: 49°15′11″N 124°10′16″W
- Country: Canada
- Province: British Columbia
- Region: Vancouver Island
- Regional District: Nanaimo
- Founded: 1912
- Elevation: 0 m (0 ft)
- Time zone: UTC−07:00 (PT)
- Area codes: 250, 778, 236, & 672
- Highways: Highway 19

Red Gap is southeast of Nanoose Bay on the east coast of southern Vancouver Island, British Columbia. The ghost town on BC Highway 19 is by road about 22 kilometres (14 mi) north of Nanaimo, and 16 kilometres (10 mi) south of Parksville.

== Name origin ==
Formerly, the location was known as part of "the flats" of Nanoose Bay. Logs were delivered by the adjacent E&N Railway for offloading, assembling as log rafts, and towing by tug to various sawmills. When Joe and Max McKercher established a sawmill in 1912, the mill name defined the location. When a precise name was needed for the opening of the post office in 1917, Harry Leon Wilson's 1915 novel provided the inspiration for the community name, the 1918 Ruggles of Red Gap movie, and the two remakes.

== Sawmill ==
The 1913 takeover by Newcastle Lumber Company and Merchant Trust joint venture suggests financial problems, but the employees were able to field their first mill soccer team that year. After bankruptcy, the mill was idle throughout 1916, before acquisition by Frank Pendleton's Straits Lumber Co.

Logs arrived by rail, or were towed in as rafts, and the finished product left by rail, or was barged across the bay for loading onto ships for export, Japan being the primary destination. Lumber was milled to unique Japanese dimensions. Owing to insufficient land between the railway and the shoreline, the complex rested on pilings. Japan's early recovery from the Great Depression kept the mill busy. For three years during the 1930s, at the peak of its operations, the Straits mill was the largest in the Pacific Northwest.

A 1940 fire in the green chain caused some damage. However, the Japanese attack on Pearl Harbor in 1941 put the mill out of business within months. A fire during demolition in 1942 destroyed much of the structure, then owned by H. R. MacMillan. A suspicious 1944 fire razed the remainder and two occupied buildings. The intense heat buckled E&N tracks for a few hundred yards, destroyed a boxcar, and damaged telephone wires. Months earlier, the Forestry Department had burned down shacks that posed a safety hazard. The site continued in use by smaller operations into the early 1950s.

== Community ==
Workers brought in from India, Japan and China, were housed separately in buildings (upon pilings) near the mouth of the creek. The company store, post office, and other accommodation were on the southwest side beyond the railway track and parallel highway. In the late 1910s, excessive speed by motorists was a concern. By the mid-1930s, the expanded non-European housing nestled between the road and rail arteries.

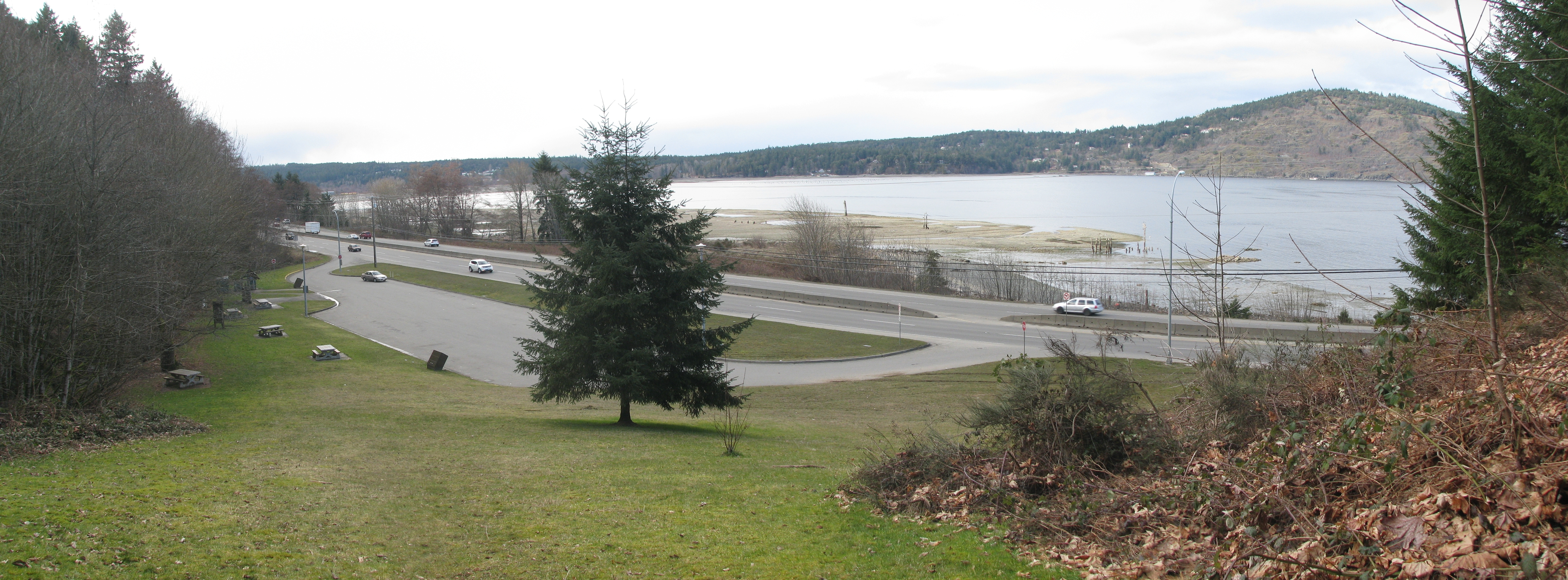
Red Gap from settlement with mill site pilings visible at Nanoose Bay shoreline

== Present status ==
Today the site is marked by a rest area on the southbound side of Highway 19. No houses or other buildings remain. The widened highway has encompassed the land once occupied by the settlement. The only visible sign that remains is the worn pilings of the sawmill complex which protrude from the mudflats of the bay. The Red Gap name only lives on in a small shopping centre at nearby Nanoose Bay.
