= Green Chain =

Green Chain may refer to:

- Green Chain (sawmill), lumber-sorting scheme
- South East London Green Chain, collection of British open spaces
- The Green Chain, a 2007 feature film by Mark Leiren-Young, explores the issues facing dying logging communities in British Columbia
