= Hells Gate Airtram =

Aerial tramway in British Columbia, Canada

Hell's Gate Airtram
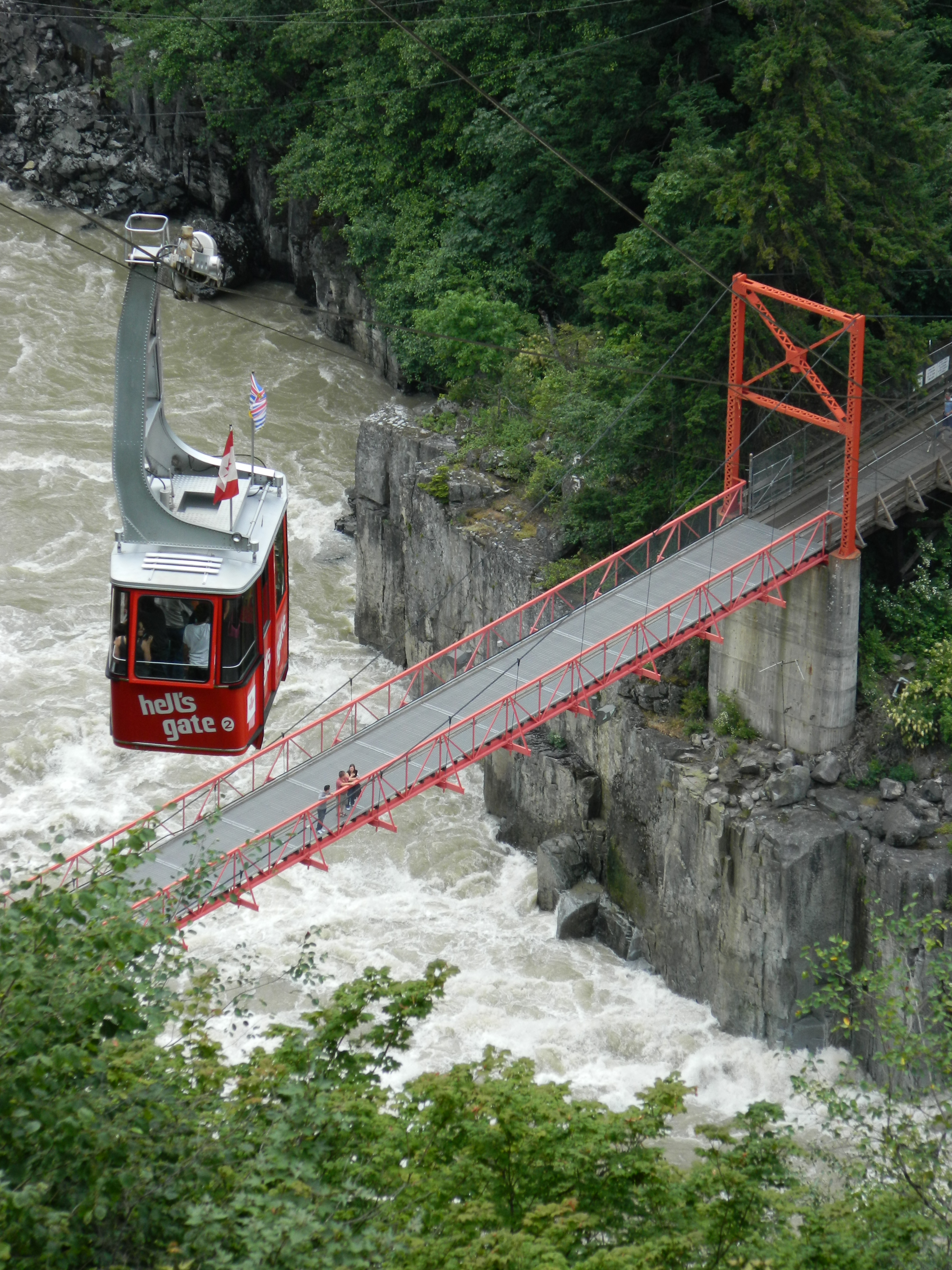
- Hell's Gate Airtram above the Hell's Gate Suspension Bridge
- Interactive map of Hell's Gate Airtram

Overview
- Status: Operational
- Character: Aerial tramway
- System: Habegger Engineering Works
- Location: Boston Bar, British Columbia, Canada
- Coordinates: 49°46′50″N 121°26′59″W
- Termini: Trans-Canada Highway (east); Hells Gate (west)
- No. of stations: 2
- Construction begin: 1970
- Open: 21 July 1971
- Website: www.hellsgateairtram.com

Operation
- Operator: Hells Gate Airtram Inc.
- Carrier capacity: 25 passengers (per car); 530 passengers (per hour, one-way)
- Operating times: April - October

Technical features
- Line length: 341 m (1,119 ft)
- Operating speed: 5 m/s (16 ft/s)
- Notes: Electric motor powering cable bullwheel
- Maximum Gradient: 51%

The Hells Gate Airtram is an aerial tramway that crosses Fraser Canyon immediately above Hells Gate in British Columbia, Canada. It starts at a parking lot off the Trans-Canada Highway and descends to its lower terminal on the opposite side of the canyon where there is an observation deck, a restaurant, a gift shop and other tourist attractions. It was built in 1970 by the Swiss manufacturer Habegger Engineering Works and opened on 21 July 1971. Before its construction, the only way to the observation deck was to hike down the canyon to the pedestrian suspension bridge that bridges the canyon.

== Overview ==
The aerial tramway contains two cabins that can carry 25 people each, plus the cabin attendant. Each cabin travels up and down along its own track rope at a maximum speed of 5 m/s (18 km/h, 984 ft/min) over an inclined length of 341 m (1118 ft). The horizontal distance between the terminals is 303 m (994 ft) and their difference in altitude is 157 m (515 ft). The mean inclination between the terminals is 51%. The track ropes have a diameter of 40mm, the haul rope connecting the two cabins via the drive bull wheel in the upper terminal has a diameter of 19mm and its counter rope 15mm. The track ropes are anchored in the upper terminal and are tensioned by two concrete blocks of 42 tons each suspended inside the lower terminal where the blocks have a leeway of 7.9m to move up and down. The haul rope and its counter rope are tensioned by a counterweight of 3.5 tons, also in the lower terminal. The max output of the motor is 140 HP (104 kW). The total carrying capacity of the aerial tramway is 530 passengers per hour (one way).

== Gallery ==
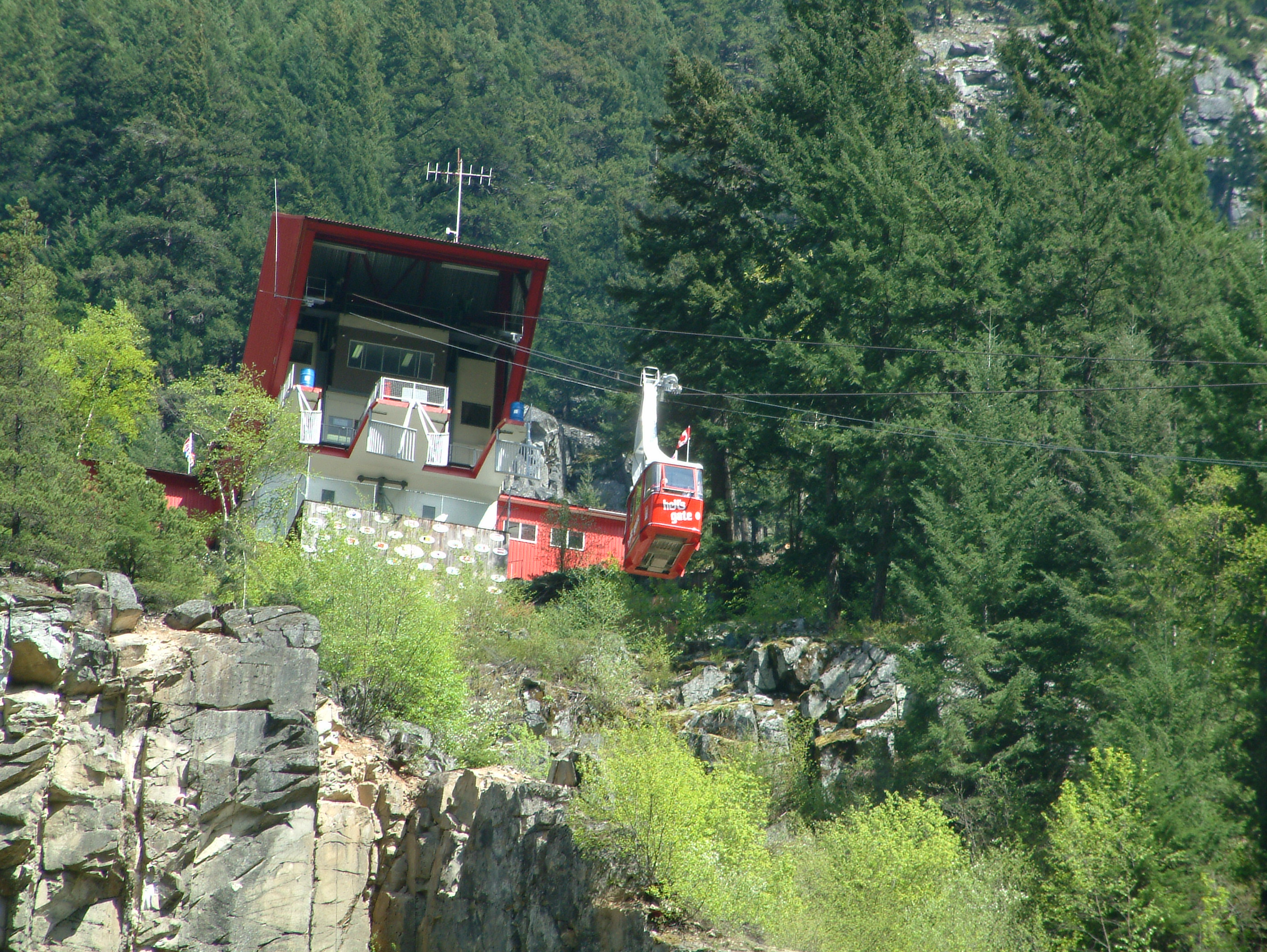
Trans-Canada Highway terminus

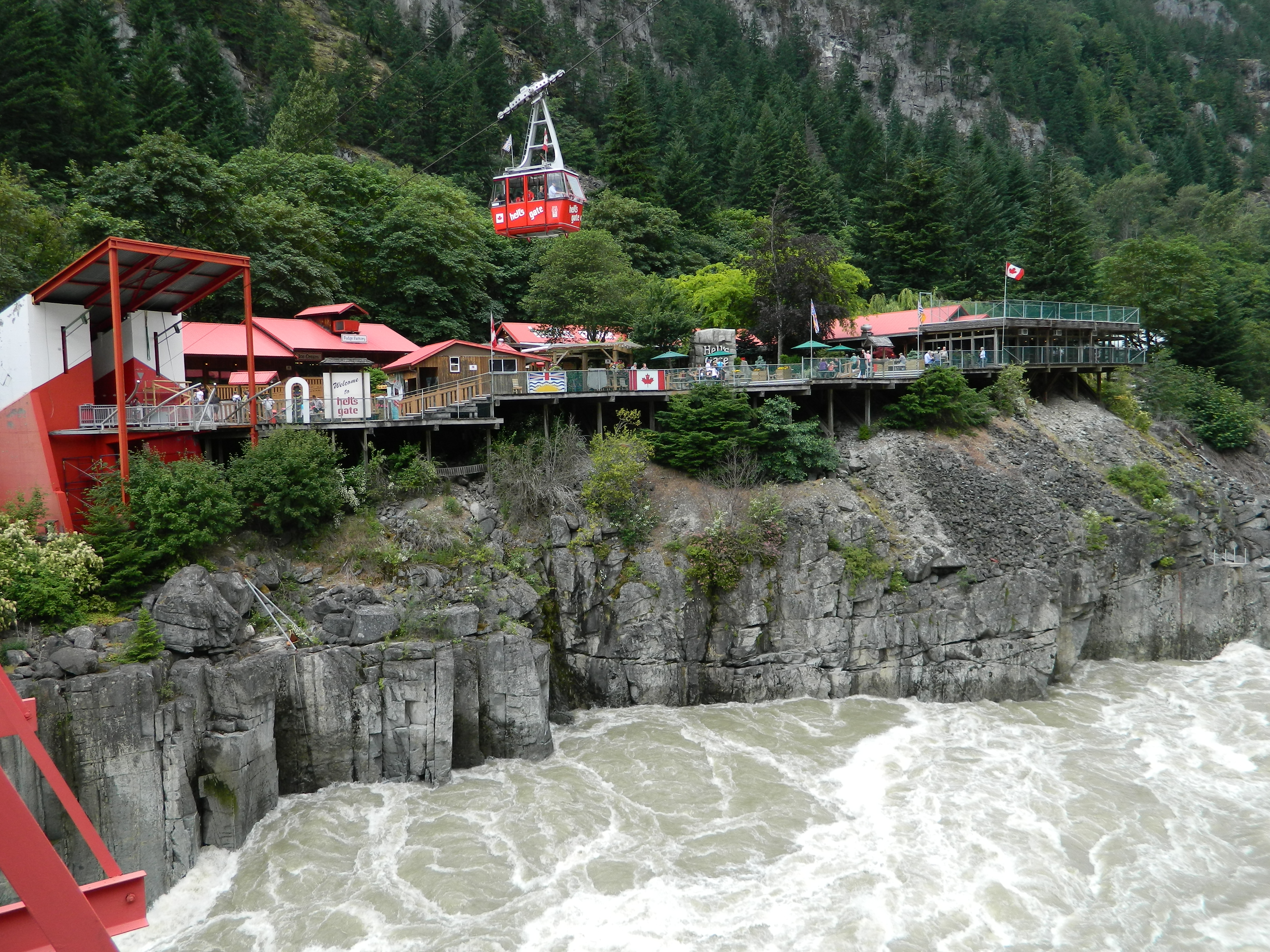
Hell's Gate Terminus

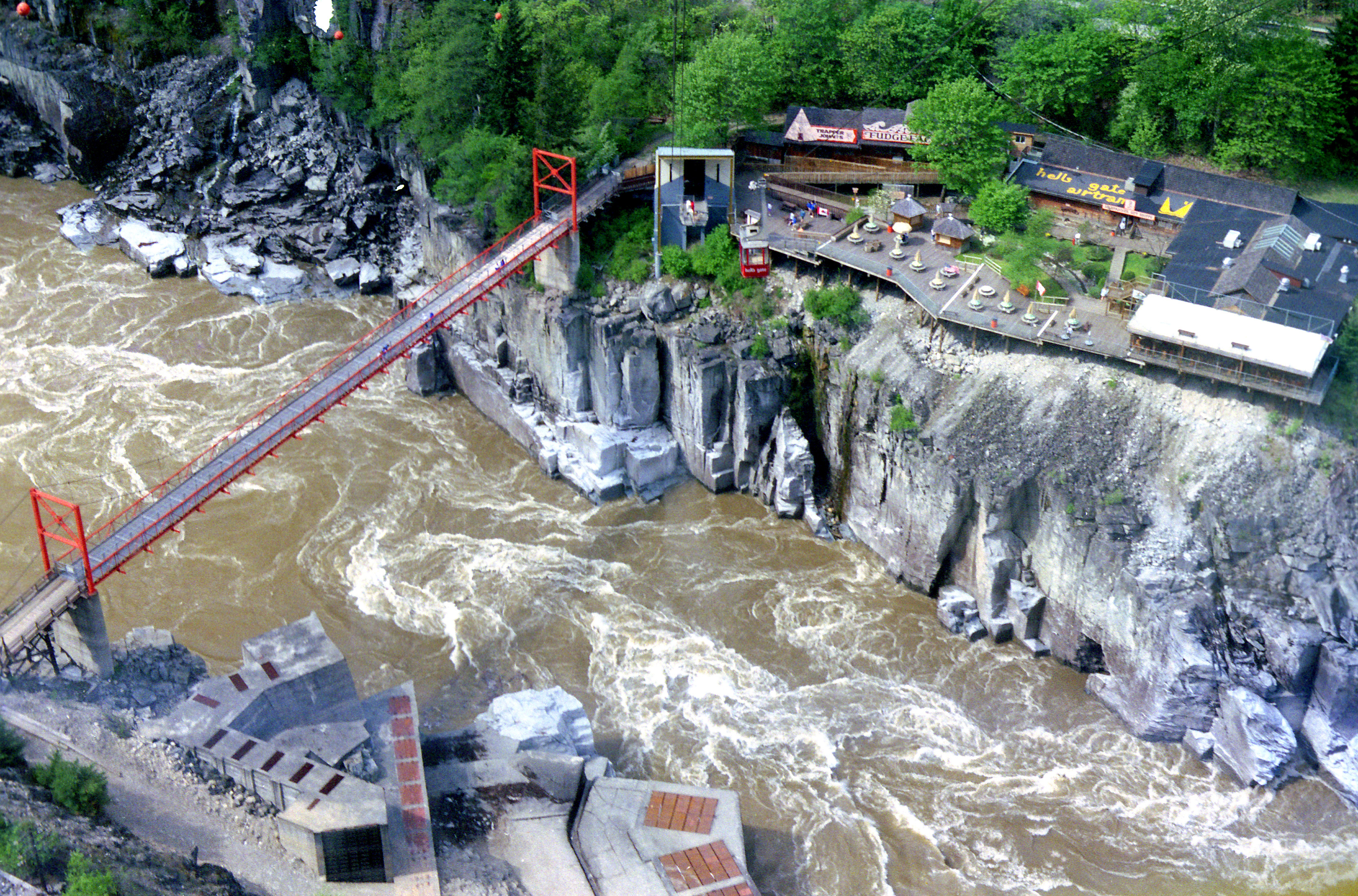
View of Hells Gate from the tram

== See also ==
- List of crossings of the Fraser River
- Grouse Mountain Skyride
