= Hells Gate (British Columbia) =

Geographic landmark in British Columbia, Canada

Coordinates: 49°47′00″N 121°27′00″W

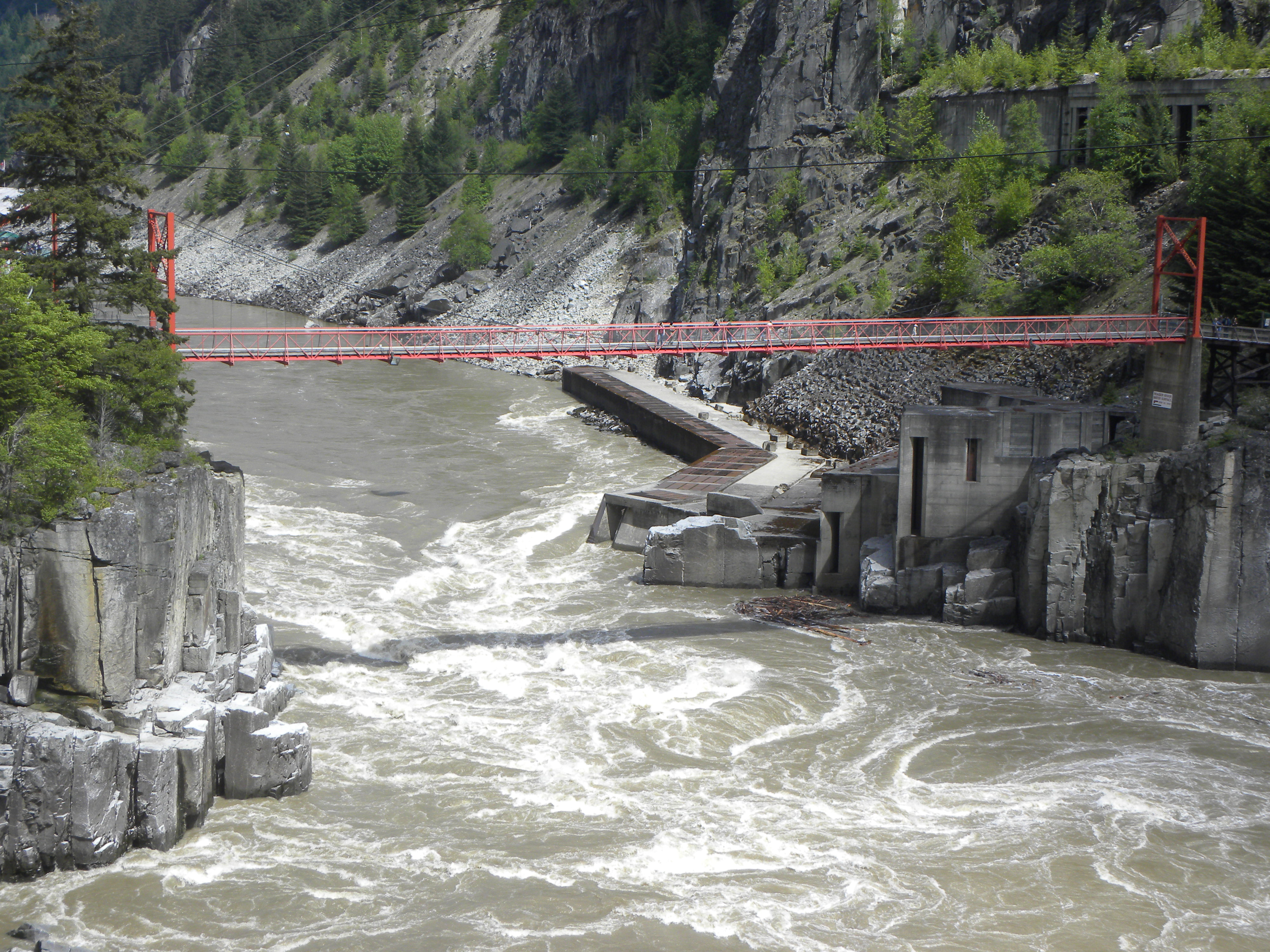
Hells Gate, British Columbia

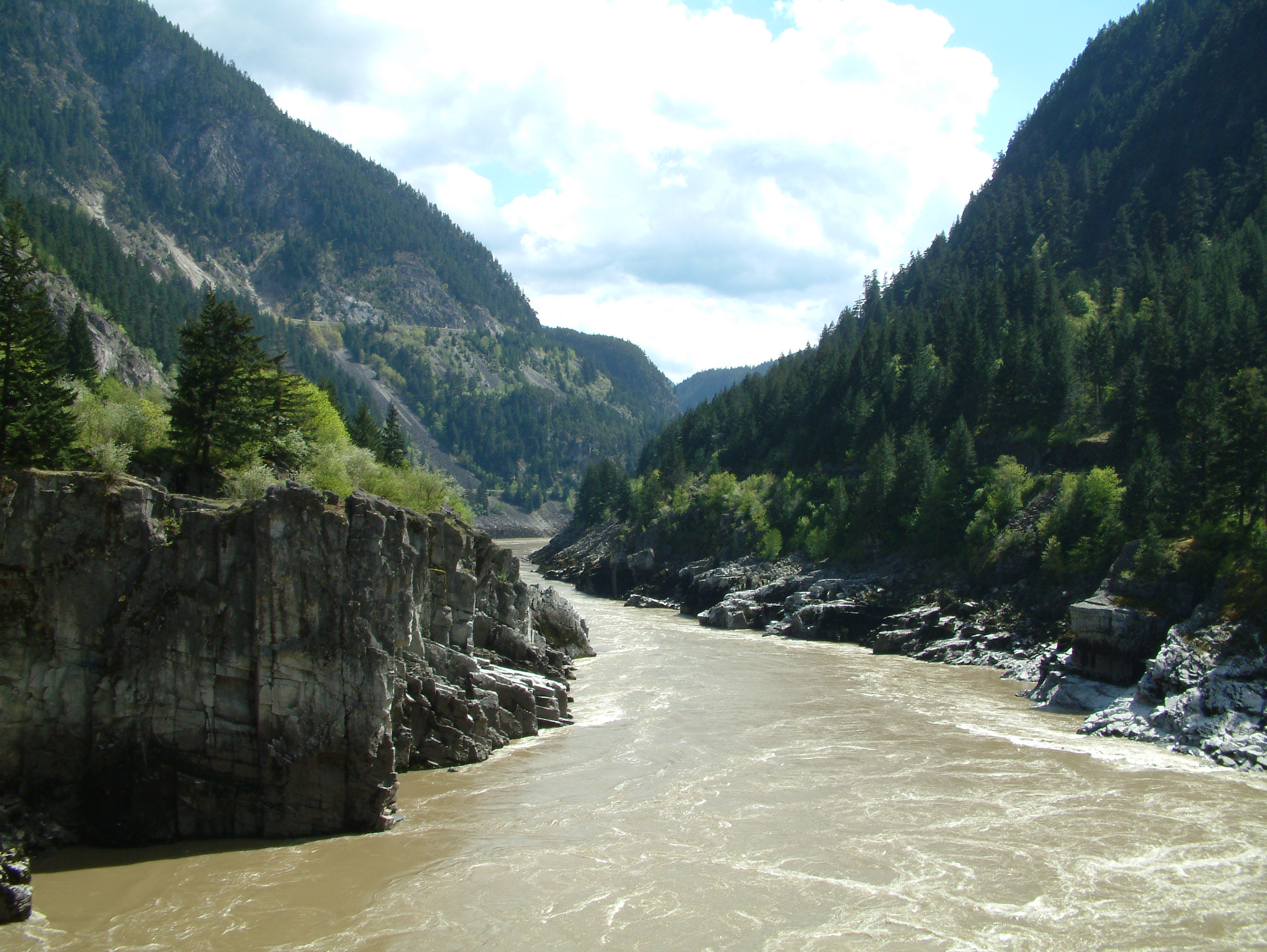
Hells Gate, British Columbia

Hells Gate is an abrupt narrowing of British Columbia's Fraser River, located immediately downstream of Boston Bar in the southern Fraser Canyon. The towering rock walls of the Fraser River plunge toward each other forcing the waters through a passage only 35 metres (115 ft) wide. It is also the name of the rural locality at the same location.

For centuries, the narrow passage has been a popular fishing ground for Aboriginal communities in the area. European settlers also began to congregate there in the summer months to fish. Eventually, the Fraser Canyon became a route used by gold rush miners wishing to access the upper Fraser gold-bearing bars and the upper country beyond up the Fraser and the Thompson. In the 1880s the Canadian Pacific Railway (CPR) built a transcontinental railway that passed along the bank at Hell's Gate, and in 1911 the Canadian Northern Railway (CNoR) began constructing a second track. In 1914 a large rockslide triggered by CNoR construction fell into the river at Hells Gate, obstructing the passage of Pacific salmon needing to swim upstream to spawn. Salmon had difficulty passing through the now swifter water, and were appearing in increased numbers downstream below the Hells Gate passage and in tributary rivers and streams that they had not inhabited before. In the winter of 1914 debris removal began, and in 1915 the river was pronounced clear. However many biologists claim that the river was permanently altered and the salmon migration would forever remain disturbed by the slide.

A decrease in Fraser salmon catalyzed tension between the Government of Canada and the Aboriginal peoples of the area. Not only did the debris clearing operation impede their access to the river, but the government imposed new fishing restrictions, such as a four-day-per-week limit, in an attempt to preserve the salmon population. Ultimately the slide and subsequent restrictions proved very damaging for the Aboriginal fishing economy.

The Canadian and United States governments formed the Pacific Salmon Convention (PSC) of 1937, which created the International Pacific Salmon Fisheries Commission (IPSFC) (now the Pacific Salmon Commission). The IPSFC carried out extensive research, and as based on their findings they recommended that fishways be constructed to help migrating salmon pass through Hells Gate. Building of the fishways began in 1944.

This decision sparked a major controversy in the Pacific fisheries and research community, which became divided along national lines. American William Thompson, head researcher for the IPSFC, was criticized by Canadian zoologist William Ricker who claimed that the IPSFC research was unreliable and that fishways were not a means to preserving Fraser salmon. Ricker believed that Hells Gate posed no threat to migrating salmon, and that commercial over-fishing did. He held that stringent regulations should be placed on fishing for Fraser salmon.

The fishways at Hells Gate became a tourist attraction in the 1970s. Among the attractions for tourists are the airtram, food outlets, observation decks and an educational fisheries exhibit.

== History ==
The name Hells Gate was derived from the journal of explorer Simon Fraser, who in 1808 described this narrow passage as "a place where no human should venture, for surely these are the gates of Hell." Long before the arrival of Simon Fraser, and as early as the end of the last ice age, Hells Gate was a First Nations congregation ground for settlement and salmon fishing. Archaeological evidence from old occupation sites and isotope analysis of human skeletal remains suggest that settlement and migration patterns for indigenous peoples in the Canyon correlated with the seasonal migration patterns of Pacific salmon. During the last deglaciation 4000–6000 years ago, long tongues of ice formed wedges and dams in the river's basin above the canyon, resulting in the formation of large reservoirs and new lakes—creating optimal spawning grounds for salmon. During this inter-glacial period, salmon began to populate the Fraser River and used Hells Gate passage as their route to upstream spawning grounds. Constricted by two steep subvertical granodiorite walls, the incredibly narrow passage and high water velocity made this part of the upstream journey extraordinarily difficult for salmon, and they would hover along the shores of the river or rest in its back-eddies. As a result, Hells Gate’s geology provided the Indigenous fishers with superb opportunities to readily catch salmon congregated at the river’s edge attempting to elude the strong currents and rough waters. Hells Gate became one of the most popular fishing stations along the Fraser River— pre- and post-colonial contact— where large numbers of aboriginal locals, and eventually European settlers, congregated during the summer months to fish for migrating salmon. Standing on adjacent rocks or on specially constructed wooden platforms extending from surrounding cliffs, fishermen would use long dip nets to snatch the salmon. Salmon fishing at Hells Gate was so prolific that, as Matthew Evenden asserts, the aboriginal culture along the Fraser River was built on a "salmon economy." After Simon Fraser charted the river in the early nineteenth century, it became (and Hells Gate with it) an established corridor between the Pacific Ocean and the interior of what was to become British Columbia. Yet, as Fraser first noted, safe water transportation through the 115 foot wide opening at Hells Gate has proven virtually impossible.

=== Hells Gate slide ===
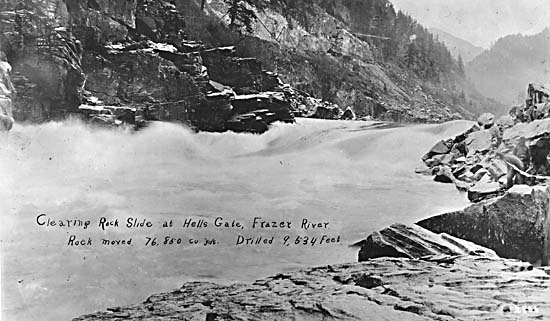
Clearing Rock Slide at Hells Gate, Fraser River

By the 1850s the Fraser Canyon was transformed from a First Nations and fur trade corridor to a busy route, called the Cariboo Road, used by gold rush miners seeking access to the upper Fraser Basin. During the 1880s, the Canadian Pacific Railway built a new transcontinental railroad to unite the far-flung provinces of the young Dominion of Canada. This nation-building project saw new railroad tracks constructed on the west riverbank at Hells Gate, connecting the British Columbia coast to the Interior (and the rest of Canada) through the Fraser Canyon. Some assert that rocks and debris dumped into the river during construction of the CPR constricted the river flow and impeded salmon passage, though there is no documented historical or physical evidence to support this claim. By early 1911 the Canadian Northern Railway began a second transcontinental railway along the south and east bank of the canyon, which was completed in a year's time. While carving into canyon walls to create new rail-bed, rock and debris were again dumped into the river in significant volumes at various locations, including Hells Gate. In early 1914, two years after the completion of the CNoR and during construction of a new tunnel, a large rockslide fell into the river just above the Hells Gate portal. Debris dispersed on the river bottom caused a 5-meter vertical drop in water depth and increased water velocity from five metres per second to 6.75 metres per second. As observed and noted by local residents and later by biologists in the aftermath of the slide, noticeably higher water velocity seemed to exceed the swimming capacity of the salmon, resulting in premature mortality and reduced populations of salmon fry in the subsequent year. In an initial attempt to redress the ecological and physical changes at Hells Gate that impeded migrating salmon, tons of rocks and debris were removed from the river during the winter of 1914-1915. By early 1915, Hells Gate was pronounced clear. While government officials declared that the river at Hells Gate was fully restored, many biologists maintain that the slide permanently altered the river's ecology.

=== Environmental impacts on salmon ===
==== Short term ====
Environmental change triggered by the slide at Hells Gate has led to habitat destruction and depletion of salmon species. The slide altered the environment of the river by increasing turbulence and density, and salmon's ability to swim upstream was seriously disrupted as many fish, exhausted by the journey through Hells Gate, were carried back downstream. Daily alterations of water levels also hindered passage of some fish species, and Evenden even goes so far as to equate the slide to "an enormous dam". The slide's impacts became visible by the decreasing amount of salmon upriver and the constant fish supply below led to alternating cycles of salmon’s expansion and decline, with runs coming at the beginning of the seasons faring better in the changed environment than the later runs, which experienced a more significant decline. Unable to swim upriver, salmon relocated into rivers and tributary streams that were not previously used by them, and increased fish concentration spanned up to several kilometers below the Hells Gate passage. Pink salmon have taken greater environmental toll than sockeye, as the pinks are of a smaller size and therefore, weaker swimmers than the sockeye. Salmon were forced to spawn in new places and many died without spawning or did not produce many offspring as the habitat was "unsuitable." Changes in "racial units" upstream, accounted for the majority of salmon population, were traced back to Hells Gate obstruction. As well, the majority of the salmon that did not get through the passage were females (in Spuzzum Creek the male to female ratio was 1:20). Ultimately, in the short term, salmon population declined.

==== Long term ====
Slide-triggered environmental changes that threaten salmon in the short term can be disastrous in the long run, as a "year's run once eliminated does not return." Decline in salmon was noticeable for about 14 years after the slide occurred. Pacific salmon have a unique four-year cycle, with some years being "big" and some "small"; 1913 was a "big" year, and 1917 should have been as well. However the salmon numbers were especially low in 1917, which signalled changes in the "original cycle." 1913 was estimated to produce 2,401,488 salmon, while 1917 estimates were substantially lower, at 559,702 salmon. By the mid-20th century the slide had destroyed a significant amount of salmon from the Upper Adams River, where restoration efforts had limited success. Salmon depletion was perceived by Babcock as possibly leading to "extermination" of the salmon in the region. Studies done in 1941 mentioned that Hells Gate inhibited salmon passage, where salmon clustering below the passage matured into spawning sockeye. After the fishways were installed the sockeye numbers increased, and pink salmon numbers upriver rebounded. Ultimately salmon "homing tendency is remarkably strong," therefore many sockeye easily fall victim to human triggered changes of the environment.

=== Social and political impacts ===
The altered river environment threatened the salmon population, which in turn created tension between the Canadian government and the aboriginal peoples of the region. The crisis at Hells Gate triggered changes in aboriginal fishing rights in the canyon. In July, 1914, the aboriginal fishery of the Nlaka'pamux arrived to commence their traditional fishing season. Upon arriving at a traditional fishing spot that they considered to be on their land, they were prevented from fishing by the Provincial Public Works board, who were clearing the post-slide debris from the river. They wrote to the Department of Indian Affairs about the unfair treatment they had received in not being able to exercise their rights to fish. A commissioner monitoring the clearing of the dam told the aboriginal fishermen that the slide had many causes, but that the main concern was to protect the fish. The Nlaka'pamux people blamed the Canadian Pacific Railway for the scarcity of fish, and argued that "all the fish [they] would catch in the year would not equal the number caught in one day by the white men at the mouth of the river." They had lost six days of valuable fishing and wanted the Department to reimburse them for the loss. But the Department of Indian Affairs informed the Nlaka'pamux that no action would be taken until an official report had been written by the Department of Marine and Fisheries. This inaction angered the Nlaka'pamux further, who leaked the story to the press with the hope of helping their cause. However, this did not save them from a four-day-per-week fishing restriction imposed by federal Fisheries Officer F.H Cunningham.

The post-slide restorations to Hells Gate carried out by the Department of Fisheries were viewed by the aboriginal peoples as unsatisfactory. In 1916, a group of aboriginal people offered suggestions and improvements to the Gate's restoration, however Fisheries officials dismissed them and their ideas were not taken into account. Through regulation and decreased runs, the aboriginal population experienced local famines whilst the commercial fisheries continued to operate downstream. Fishing became less of a contributor to the aboriginal economy and aboriginal communities were forced to turn to the Skeena River system and intensify their moose hunting in order to adapt to the restrictions on fishing.

The commercial fishery had a more detached relationship with the issues surrounding the slide. They supported the action taken by the government to remove the physical obstructions, and also their decision to prevent aboriginal people from fishing. The commercial fishery experienced a four-year delay and did not feel the effects of the slide until 1917 when the total catch was 6,883,401 compared to the 31,343,039 Sockeye caught in 1913. The commercial fishery diversified their product lines due to the slide's impacts, at the same time intensifying fishing efforts. At the time, Henry Bell-Irving went so far as to contended that the Fraser fishery was "'practically a thing of the past.'"

=== The International Pacific Salmon Fisheries Commission (IPSFC) ===
After decades of dispute over who should get what quantity of the Pacific Salmon catch, in 1937 Canada and the United States successfully negotiated a joint management and catch agreement, called the Pacific Salmon Convention (PSC). This convention created the International Pacific Salmon Fisheries Commission (IPSFC), which was to carry out the convention's mandate and conduct an eight-year study of pacific salmon. The Commission would shape their mandate based on findings from this research.

American researcher William Thompson headed the research team for the IPSFC, which tagged fish at various upstream locations, from which data could be collected for analysis. One of these sites was at Hells Gate, where scientists captured salmon along the banks with fill nets, tagged them, removed some of their scales for racial analysis, and then released them back into the river. In 1938, the IPSFC discovered what appeared to be a blockage of Fraser sockeye salmon at Hells Gate. Fish were turning up in tagging nets more than once, being held up behind the narrow passage of river, and re-appearing far downstream after being tagged. Based on these findings, Thompson decided to place increased emphasis on Hells Gate beginning in 1939.

In 1941 something exceptional happened with the Fraser salmon migration. Whereas in previous years it appeared that the fish were blocked for up to a week each spawning season, this year the blockage lasted for months, spanning from July through October. Thompson took this opportunity to significantly increase tagging operations, exclaiming with pride that his was "'one of the most extensive tagging programs of its kind ever undertaken.'" By reviewing historical research data Thompson set his analysis of Hells Gate in a wide historical context, and using his own studies he concluded that the rock obstruction at Hells Gate was the primary cause of the decades long decline in salmon in the Fraser River. As a solution to this problem, the construction of several fishways began in 1944.

=== International dispute ===
Canadian zoologist William Ricker, who was one of the scientists originally employed by the IPFSC, became an outspoken critic of the decision to build fishways and of Thompson’s research. Ricker challenged the foundational finding of Thompson’s research: that only 20% of fish could pass through Hells Gate. He claimed that these data were so selective that they were unreliable and misleading. Two reasons for this, which Ricker believed could have been easily overcome with adjustments to research methods, were that the fish tagged would have been from a highly selective sample of weaker fish than average, and that tagging itself may impede a fish’s ability to subsequently swim through the rapid water at Hells Gate. Ricker stated that Thompson did not properly address these issues, and that therefore "they may be sufficient to completely invalidate the conclusion that" Hells Gate is a serious obstacle for salmon migration. Ricker also challenged other aspects of Thompson’s research, including his assumptions about the causal relationship between water levels and successful passage through Hells Gate. He further argued that there appears to be evidence (based on sex ratios above and below Hells Gate) to suggest that no significant obstruction existed after the initial clean up.

Ricker’s criticisms and Thompson’s subsequent response sparked a major controversy in the fisheries research community. This was seen by both those involved and those in the wider community as a battle waged along national lines. Some believed that because of their success in discovering the Hells Gate blockage, Ricker held a grudge against Thompson and the IPSFA. They alleged that this discovery shamed Ricker and the Biological Board of Canada, of which he was formerly a part, who should have discovered the blockage. They saw Ricker's criticism as an expression of this grudge, and "an attack on all biological fisheries work on the Pacific coast." Thompson, too, believed that Ricker’s motivations were not based on scientific grounds. He believed he therefore had a duty to expose these intentions for what they were, so his response shifted the debate away from Hells Gate to the merits of Ricker and his fellow Canadian fisheries researchers. Thompson argued that the Fisheries Research Board of Canada had intentionally or unintentionally overlooked the fact that something was amiss at Hells Gate after the initial cleanup. Either possibility was an insult to Canadian scientists.

Beyond these criticisms of Ricker and Canadian fisheries science, Thompson maintained that as fish numbers were improving, the fishways were a success and clearly necessary.

The two sides to this dispute each advocated for different remedial action. Thompson argued that environmental factors were to blame for the decline of Pacific salmon, and that the best remedy was to repair the damage to the migration pathway. Ricker believed that over-fishing was the primary threat to the Fraser salmon run, and that it would be a "gamble" to rely solely on the fishways as a means of conservation. Instead stringent regulations should be placed on salmon fishing, lest they be threatened by over fishing. Further, he feared that conservationists and fishers alike may take the construction of the fishways as an excuse to relax their vigilance, which would consequently threaten the survival of the Fraser salmon.

=== Restoration efforts ===
By 1943, the IPSFC had found 37 obstructions that were impeding the salmon run along Hells Gate. After receiving an official proposal from the IPSFC that included both biological and engineering data, both the Canadian and US governments approved a plan to construct a set of fishways at Hells Gate in 1944. In 1946, construction of the fishways on both banks was completed, offering easy passage for salmon at gauge levels between 23 and 54 feet. However, problems still remained at certain water levels. At high levels of 50–65 feet, and low levels of 11–17 feet, salmon encountered difficulty migrating upstream. In response, two high-level fishways were built beginning with one on the right bank in 1947 that operated between 54 and 70 feet as well as a fishway on the left bank that operated at the same levels and was completed in 1951. Yet some issues remained, and the fishway on the left bank was extended to operate at levels up to 92 gauge in 1965. The last addition was the construction of sloping baffles on the left bank in 1966 that aided salmon passage below gauge 24.

The total cost of the entire fishways project was $1,470,333 in 1966 which was shared by the US and Canadian governments equally. Adjusted for inflation, this is roughly $9,800,000 in 2010. Ultimately, the fishways were a successful endeavor as the upriver runs past Hells Gate had already increased fivefold in the short period between 1941 and 1945.

From 1946-1949 the IPSFC put several severe restrictions on the Fraser River fishing industries, including delayed starts to the fishing season as well as ending the season early. The severe strategies that preferred maximum protection were a success as the salmon population continued to increase into the early 1950s. Some argued that these restrictions on the salmon harvest were more beneficial to salmon re-population than the construction of the costly fishways, criticizing the decision to build them.

After the general success of the IPSFC’s restoration efforts, the Canadian government began pushing for a pink salmon treaty. Eventually signed in 1957, the Pink Salmon Protocol sought to assure that the pink salmon runs remained sustainable while also stipulating that the Canada and the US had to share equal portions of the salmon run.

=== Outcomes ===
Some argue that installation of fishways at Hells Gate caused more than just an increase in Fraser salmon, claiming that it was also a tactic to reduce the likelihood that the construction of future hydroelectric dams in the Fraser canyon would ever gain popular support.

In 1971, Hells Gate and its fishways became a tourist attraction with the completion of the Hells Gate Airtram. The tourist site now boasts food outlets, observation decks and an educational fisheries exhibit that displays different short films regarding the area’s history as well an ecological documentary on the salmon run.

== Climate ==
Hells Gate has a Warm-summer Mediterranean climate (Köppen climate type Csb). It is located in a transitional climate zone, separating the coastal oceanic climate with the inland semi-arid climate.

Climate data for Hells Gate (Elevation: 122m)
Month	Jan	Feb	Mar	Apr	May	Jun	Jul	Aug	Sep	Oct	Nov	Dec	Year
Record high °C (°F)	12.5 (54.5)	13.9 (57.0)	21.5 (70.7)	28.9 (84.0)	36.1 (97.0)	38.3 (100.9)	40.0 (104.0)	40.6 (105.1)	33.9 (93.0)	25.6 (78.1)	17.8 (64.0)	17.2 (63.0)	40.6 (105.1)
Mean daily maximum °C (°F)	0.5 (32.9)	4.8 (40.6)	9.2 (48.6)	13.8 (56.8)	19.0 (66.2)	22.8 (73.0)	26.4 (79.5)	26.3 (79.3)	20.1 (68.2)	12.8 (55.0)	5.2 (41.4)	1.3 (34.3)	13.5 (56.3)
Daily mean °C (°F)	−1.7 (28.9)	2.0 (35.6)	5.2 (41.4)	9.0 (48.2)	13.4 (56.1)	17.1 (62.8)	20.2 (68.4)	20.3 (68.5)	15.3 (59.5)	9.4 (48.9)	3.0 (37.4)	−0.7 (30.7)	9.4 (48.9)
Mean daily minimum °C (°F)	−3.9 (25.0)	−0.9 (30.4)	1.1 (34.0)	4.2 (39.6)	7.8 (46.0)	11.4 (52.5)	14.0 (57.2)	14.3 (57.7)	10.4 (50.7)	6.1 (43.0)	0.7 (33.3)	−2.8 (27.0)	5.2 (41.4)
Record low °C (°F)	−24.4 (−11.9)	−21.7 (−7.1)	−20.6 (−5.1)	−3.3 (26.1)	−2.2 (28.0)	3.9 (39.0)	5.5 (41.9)	6.1 (43.0)	−1.1 (30.0)	−13.5 (7.7)	−24.0 (−11.2)	−27.8 (−18.0)	−27.8 (−18.0)
Average precipitation mm (inches)	186.4 (7.34)	144.1 (5.67)	117.4 (4.62)	69.1 (2.72)	44.4 (1.75)	32.9 (1.30)	24.9 (0.98)	30.6 (1.20)	62.6 (2.46)	132.7 (5.22)	182.8 (7.20)	201.2 (7.92)	1,229.1 (48.39)
Average rainfall mm (inches)	113.3 (4.46)	116.8 (4.60)	111.3 (4.38)	68.9 (2.71)	44.4 (1.75)	32.9 (1.30)	24.9 (0.98)	30.6 (1.20)	62.6 (2.46)	132.5 (5.22)	162.7 (6.41)	153.6 (6.05)	1,054.4 (41.51)
Average snowfall cm (inches)	73.1 (28.8)	28.3 (11.1)	6.1 (2.4)	0.2 (0.1)	0.0 (0.0)	0.0 (0.0)	0.0 (0.0)	0.0 (0.0)	0.0 (0.0)	1.2 (0.5)	16.2 (6.4)	46.4 (18.3)	171.5 (67.5)
Source: Environment Canada (normals, 1961-1990)

== Hells Gate Airtram ==
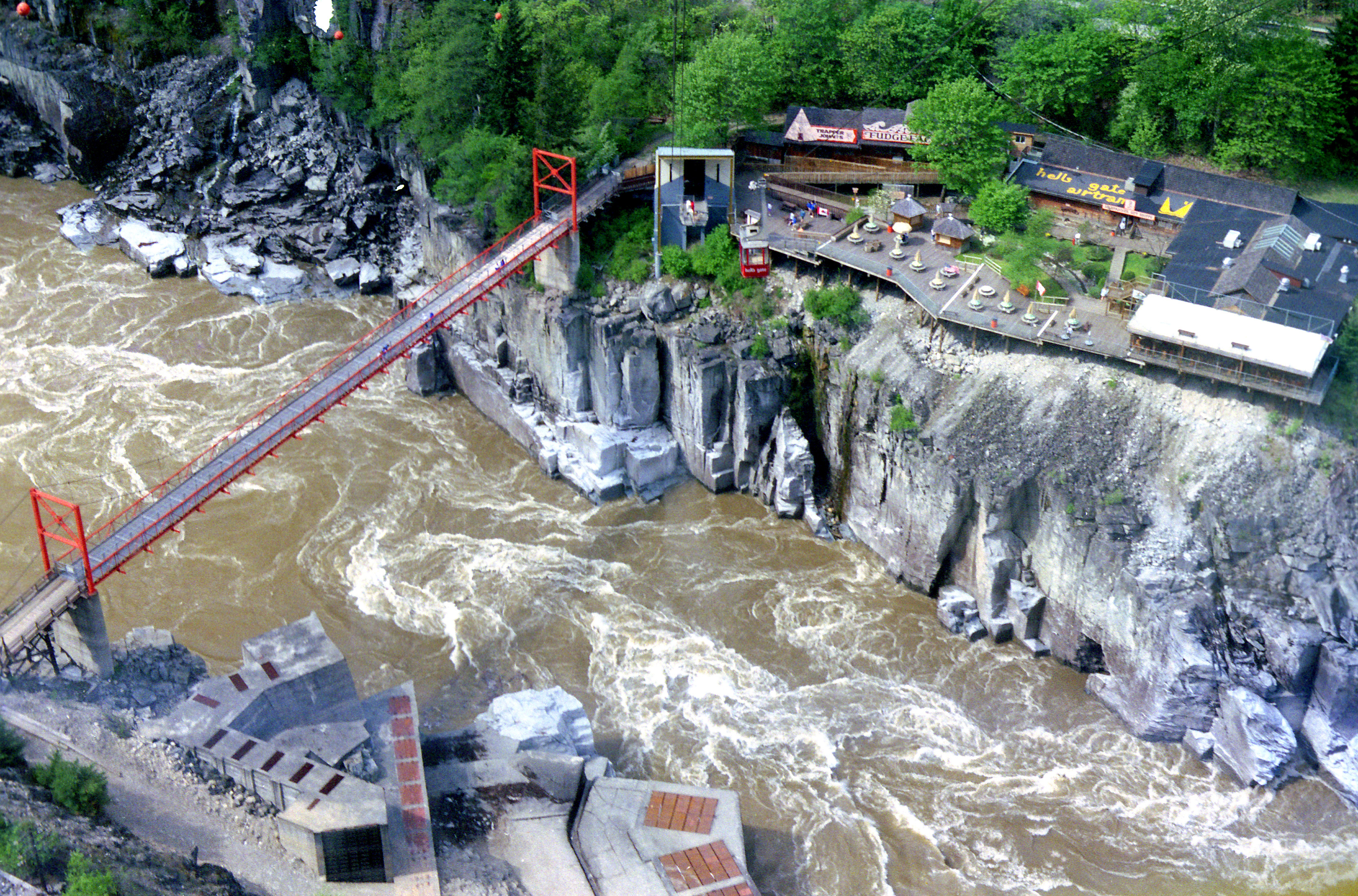
Tram view on Hell's Gate

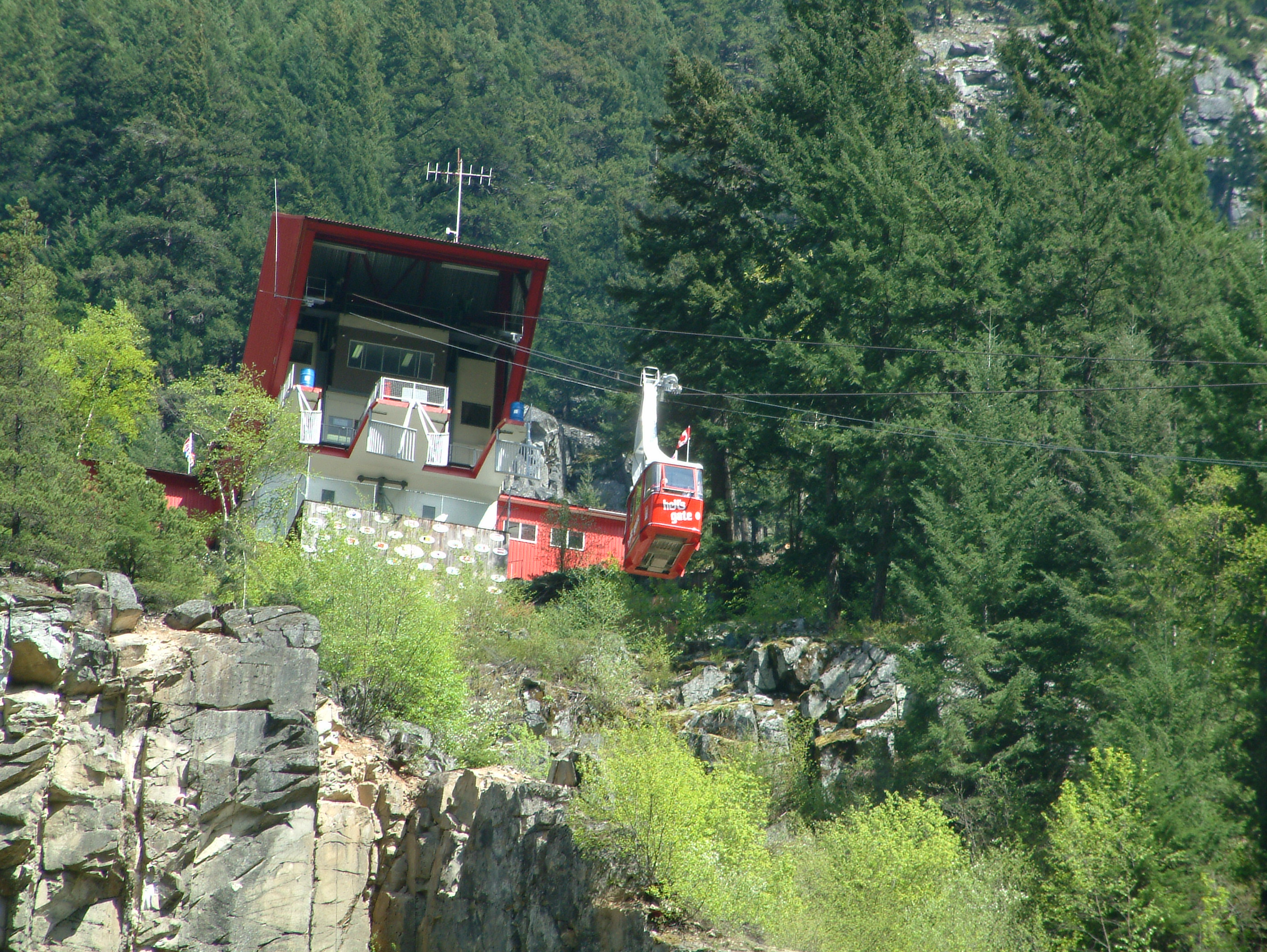
The airtram

Hells Gate Airtram starts at the parking lot of the Trans-Canada Highway and descends to its lower terminal on the opposite side of Fraser River next to the pedestrian suspension bridge, where there is an observation deck, a restaurant, a gift shop and other tourist attractions. It was built in 1970 by the Swiss manufacturer Habegger Engineering Works and opened on 21 July 1971. Its two cabins can carry 25 people each, plus the cabin attendant. Each cabin travels up and down along its own track rope at a maximum speed of 5 m/s (18 km/h, 984 ft/min) over an inclined length of 341 m (1118 ft). The horizontal distance between the terminals is 303 m (994 ft) and their difference in altitude is 157 m (515 ft). The mean inclination between the terminals is 51%. The track ropes have a diameter of 40mm, the haul rope connecting the two cabins via the drive bull wheel in the upper terminal has a diameter of 19mm and its counter rope 15mm. The track ropes are anchored in the upper terminal and are tensioned by two concrete blocks of 42 tons each suspended inside the lower terminal where the blocks have a leeway of 7.9m to move up and down. The haul rope and its counter rope are tensioned by a counterweight of 3.5 tons, also in the lower terminal. The max output of the motor is 140 HP (104 kW). The total carrying capacity of the aerial tramway is 530 passengers per hour (one way).

== Cultural references ==
"Hell's Gate" is a type of beer brewed in British Columbia and is named after the area.

== See also ==
- List of crossings of the Fraser River
- List of bridges in Canada
- Hells Gate (disambiguation)

== Works cited ==
- Babcock, John P. (1920). Fraser River Salmon Situation a Reclamation Project. Victoria, B.C.: W. H. Cullin.
- Ellis, Derek V. (1989). "Construction - Hell's Gate (Canada)". Environments at Risk: Case Histories of Impact Assessment. Berlin: Springer-Verlag.
- Evenden, Matthew D. (2004). Fish Versus Power: An Environmental History of the Fraser River.
- Evenden, Matthew D. (2000). "Remaking Hells Gate: Salmon, Science, and the Fraser River, 1938-1948". BC Studies (127). UBC Press: 47–117.
- Gardner, Matthew (2008). Western Canada Handbook. Footprint Handbooks.
- Harris, Cole (1997). The Resettlement of British Columbia: Essays on Colonialism and Geographical Change. Vancouver, B.C.: UBC Press.
- Kelm, Mary-Ellen (1998). Colonizing Bodies:Aboriginal Health and Healing in British Columbia, 1900-50. UBC Press.
- Quinn, Thomas P. (2004). The Behavior and Ecology of Pacific Salmon and Trout. Vancouver: UBC Press.
- Ricker, William E. (January 1947). "Hell's Gate and the Sockeye". Journal of Wildlife Management. 11 (1): 10–20. doi:10.2307/3796036. JSTOR 3796036.
- Roos, John F. (1991). Restoring Fraser River Salmon: A History of the International Pacific Salmon Fisheries Commission. Pacific Salmon Commission.
