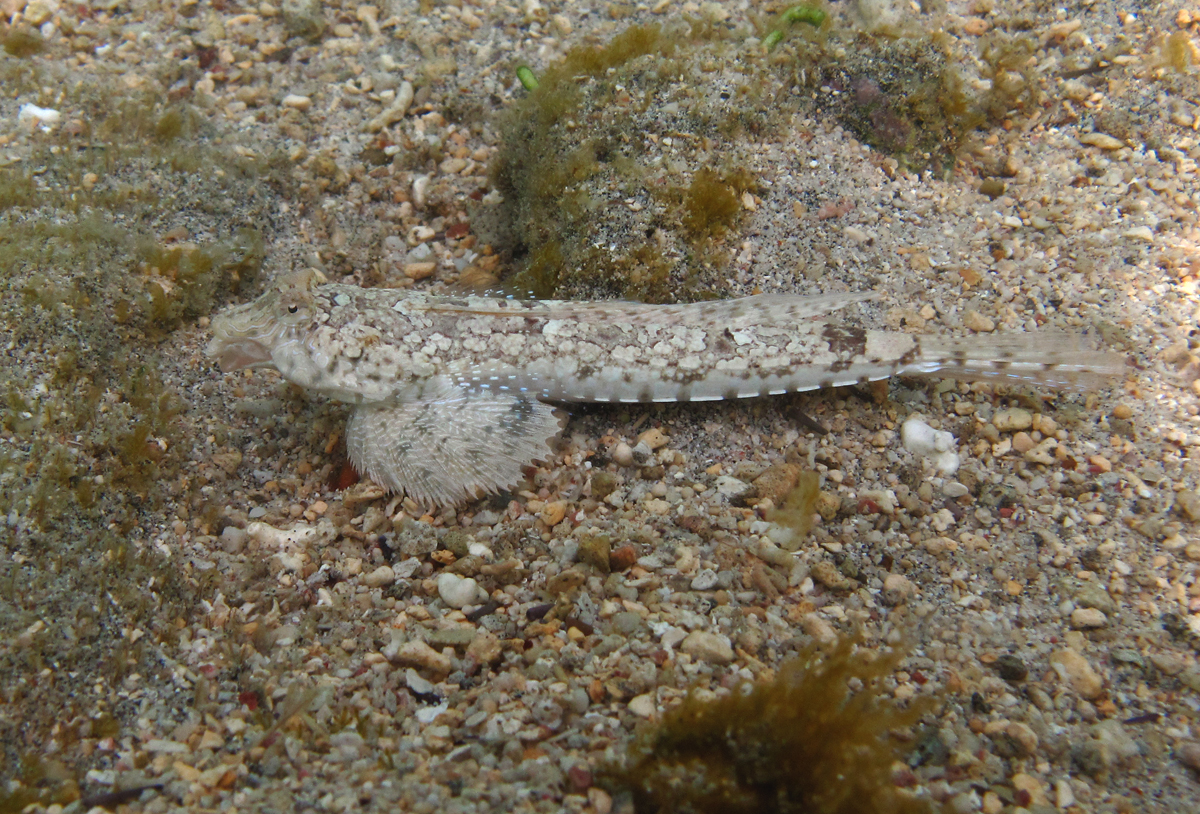
- Diplogrammus infulatus, Réunion Island

Scientific classification
- Domain: Eukaryota
- Kingdom: Animalia
- Phylum: Chordata
- Class: Actinopterygii
- Order: Callionymiformes
- Family: Callionymidae
- Genus: Diplogrammus
- Species: D. infulatus

Binomial name
- Diplogrammus infulatus J. L. B. Smith, 1963

= Diplogrammus infulatus =

Species of tropical marine fish in the dragonet family

Diplogrammus infulatus, or Indian Ocean fold dragonet or Sawspine dragonet is a species of tropical marine fish in the dragonet family, Callionymidae. It is found in the Western Indian Ocean, from the Red Sea to Delagoa Bay, Mozambique.

== Description ==
A small fish, with maximum recorded size of about 12 cm.
