= Canadian Forces Maritime Experimental and Test Ranges =

Maritime test facility in British Columbia, Canada

Coordinates: 49.30235°N 123.98423°W

The Canadian Forces Maritime Experimental and Test Ranges (CFMETR) is a maritime test facility on the east side of Vancouver Island, at Nanoose Bay.

The main gate of CFMETR Nanoose Bay

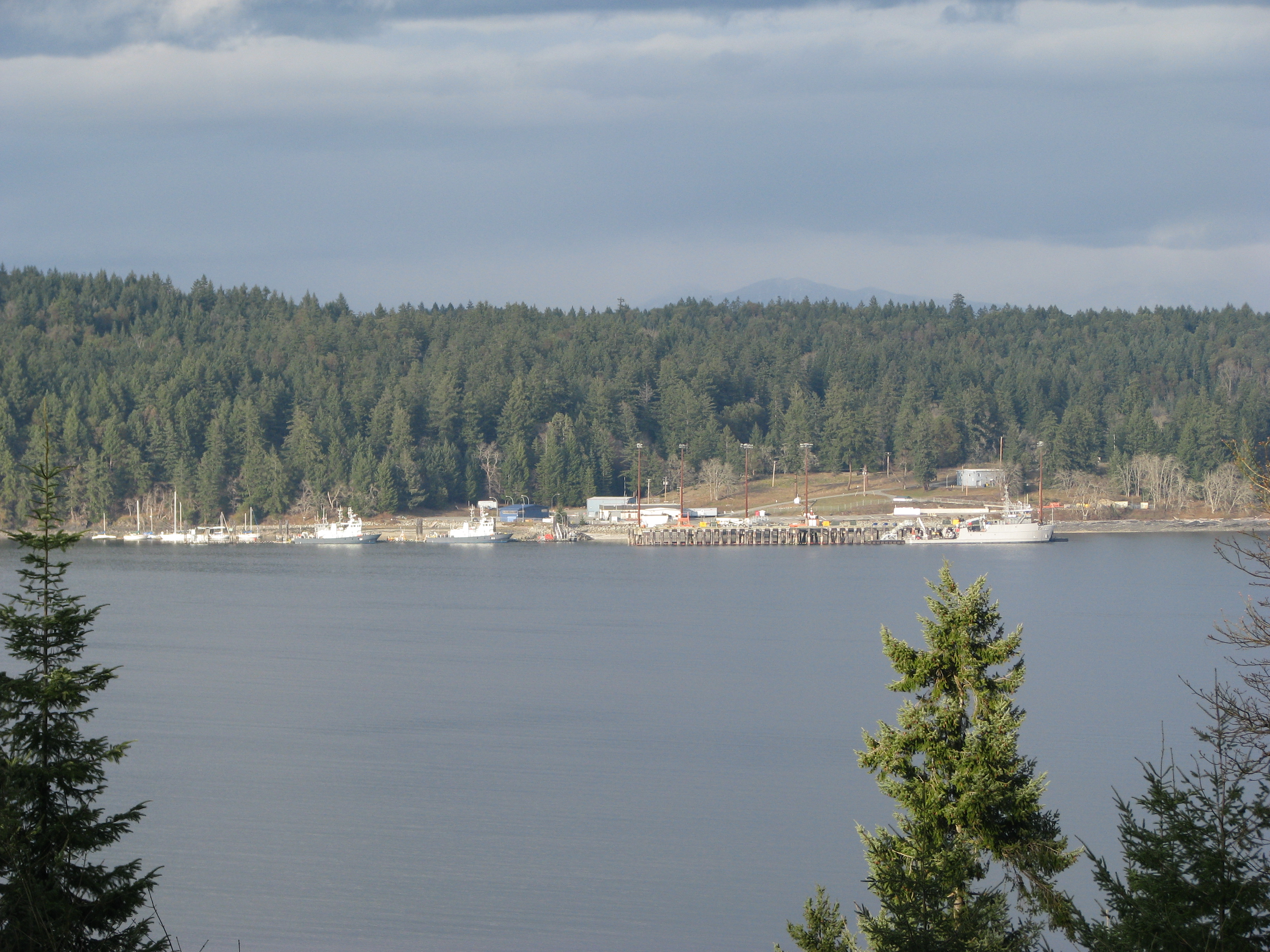
CFMETR docks from across Nanoose Bay. The craft shown, from left to right, are two Canadian Maritime Command TSRVs and one U.S. Navy YTT.

The ranges operated by CFMETR are located over an area of the Strait of Georgia—known as Area WG—that is several hundred metres deep, several dozen kilometres long and several kilometres wide over a seabed composed of soft mud and free of underwater obstacles. The facility employs a three-dimensional sonar tracking system for monitoring the performance and position of objects in these waters for real-time tracking. During periods of activity, the range area is closed off from all civilian maritime traffic as a safety measure.

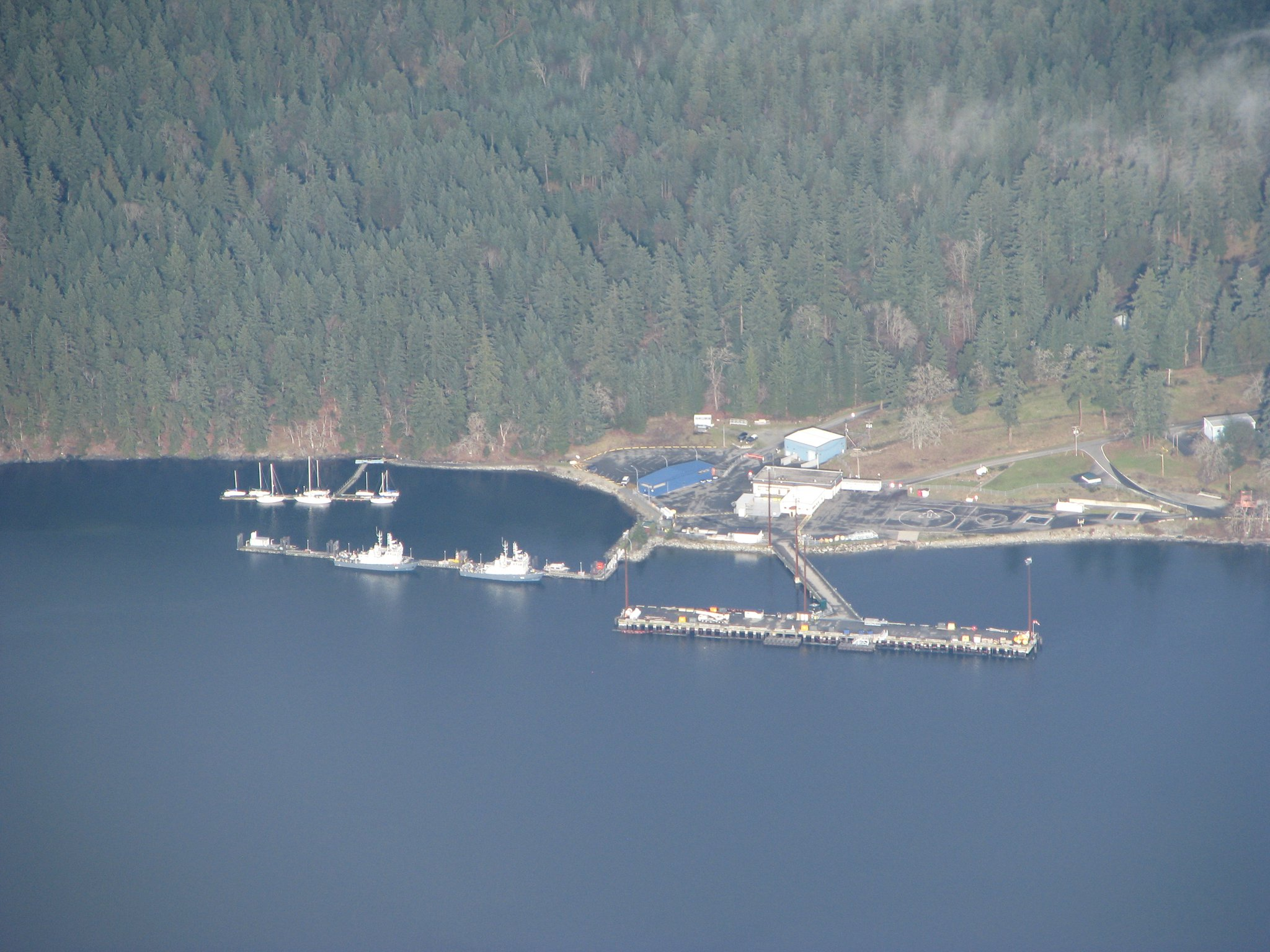

Equipment tested at the facility consists of a variety of devices, including sonobuoys, sonar systems (ship and aircraft), torpedoes and the repair and overhaul of the dipping sonar used on Canada's Sikorsky CH-148 Cyclone helicopter fleet. No explosives are used.

This facility is unique in the Canadian Forces as it staffed by active military personnel from the Royal Canadian Navy and Department of National Defence civilian employees, as well as a small number of U.S. Navy civilian employees from Naval Base Kitsap. The facility is operationally controlled as a field unit of Department of National Defence Headquarters. There is a joint funding agreement between the Canadian and United States governments.

During the Salmon War of 1997, in an attempt to leverage the US into quitting the fishing of salmon runs in Canadian waters, Premier Glen Clark of British Columbia threatened to close the base by terminating the lease for use of the seabed, which is owned by the province and leased to the Canadian military. This brought quick rebuttal from the federal government, saying that it would expropriate the area if needed.
