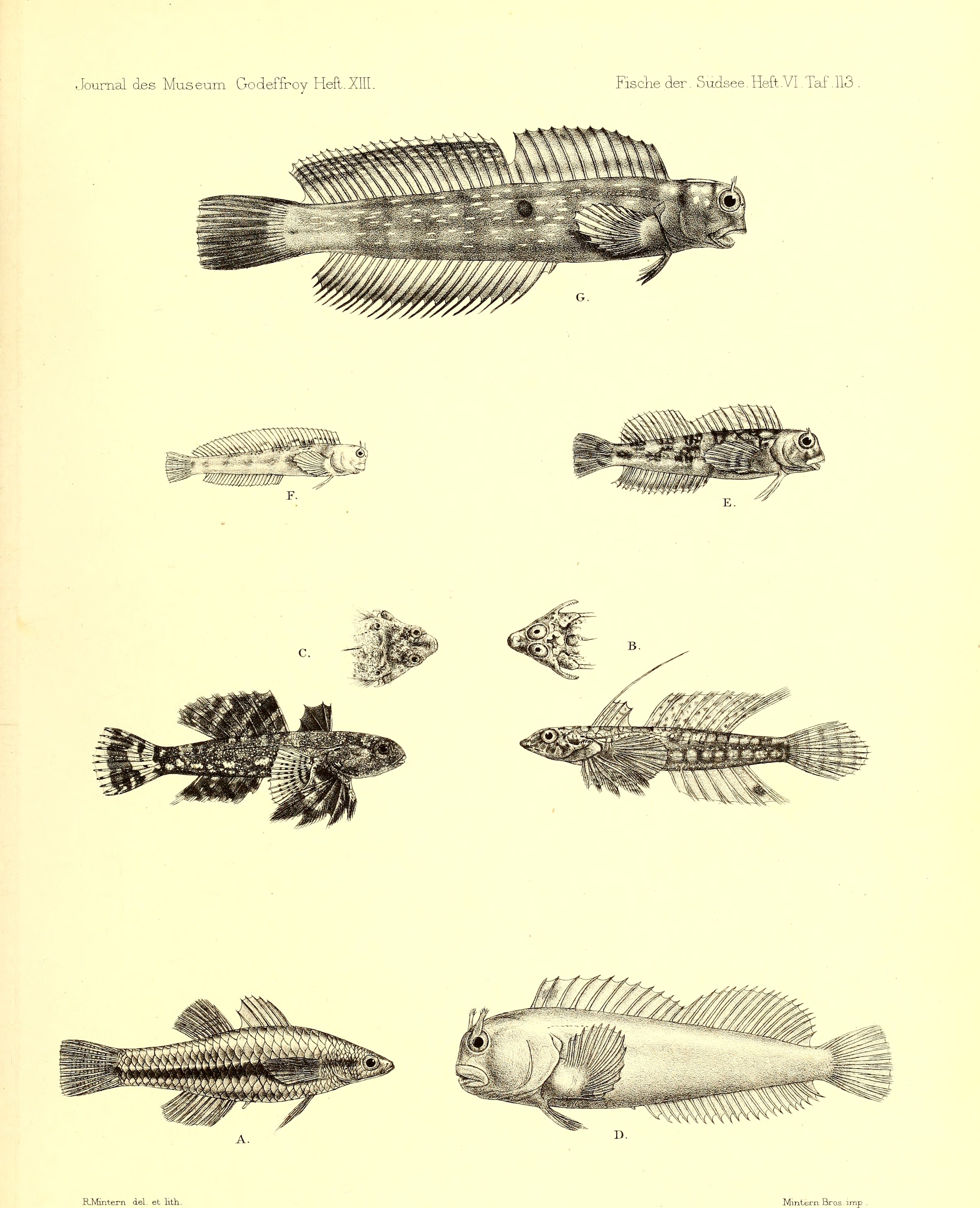
- A. Eleotris güenthen. B. Callionymus cookii. D. Blenmus sordidus. E.Blenrmis cnstatus. C. Gallionymus microps. F &. G. Salarias nitidus.

Scientific classification
- Kingdom: Animalia
- Phylum: Chordata
- Class: Actinopterygii
- Order: Syngnathiformes
- Family: Callionymidae
- Genus: Diplogrammus
- Species: D. goramensis

Binomial name
- Diplogrammus goramensis (Bleeker, 1858)

Synonyms
- Callionymus goramensis Bleeker, 1858; Callionymus cookii Günther, 1872; Dermosteira dorotheae Schulz, 1943

= Diplogrammus goramensis =

Goram dragonet

Species of tropical marine fish in the dragonet family

Diplogrammus goramensis, or Goram dragonet is a species of tropical marine fish in the dragonet family, Callionymidae. It is native to the western Pacific Ocean from China to Fiji.

== Description ==
A small fish, with maximum recorded size of about 6 cm. There is a longitudinal fold of skin along the side below the lateral line, and the operculum has a free flap of skin. In males the first dorsal spine is an elongated filament. The head has brown bars and blue vertical lines. The sides are brown mottled irregularly with white and have brown bars that extend to the belly. The first dorsal fin has oblique bands and the other fins are mottled with brown and white spots.

== Distribution ==
China to Fiji.

== Habitat ==
This is a species which is associated with reefs and occurs in a depth range of 5–40 metres (16–131 ft).
