= William Francis Thompson (biologist) =

American ichthyologist and fisheries scientist

- Born: 1888; St. Cloud, Minnesota, U.S.
- Died: November 7, 1965 (aged 76–77)
- Education: Stanford University
- Known for: Research on Pacific halibut and Fraser River sockeye salmon
- Scientific career
- Fields: Ichthyology, fisheries science
- Workplaces: University of Washington, Pacific Salmon Commission
- Thesis: The biology of the halibut, with particular reference to marking experiments (1930)

William Francis Thompson (1888 – 7 November 1965) was an American ichthyologist and fisheries scientist.

He researched the exploitation and management of the stocks of Pacific halibut for the fisheries department in British Columbia in the early 20th century, as well as the restoration Fraser River sockeye salmon run in the mid twentieth century.

Thompson attended Stanford University for his doctoral research. His dissertation was titled, The biology of the halibut, with particular reference to marking experiments. He completed the research for his dissertation in 1930 at the Hopkins Marine Station in Pacific Grove, California. Thompson was the director of the School of Fisheries at the University of Washington from 1934, and between 1937 and 1943 he was the director of the international Pacific Salmon Commission working in Canada and Alaska. He founded the Fisheries Research Institute of the University of Washington in 1947. Thompson retired in 1958 at the age of 70.

Taxa described by him

- See Category:Taxa named by William Francis Thompson
