= MV Malaspina =

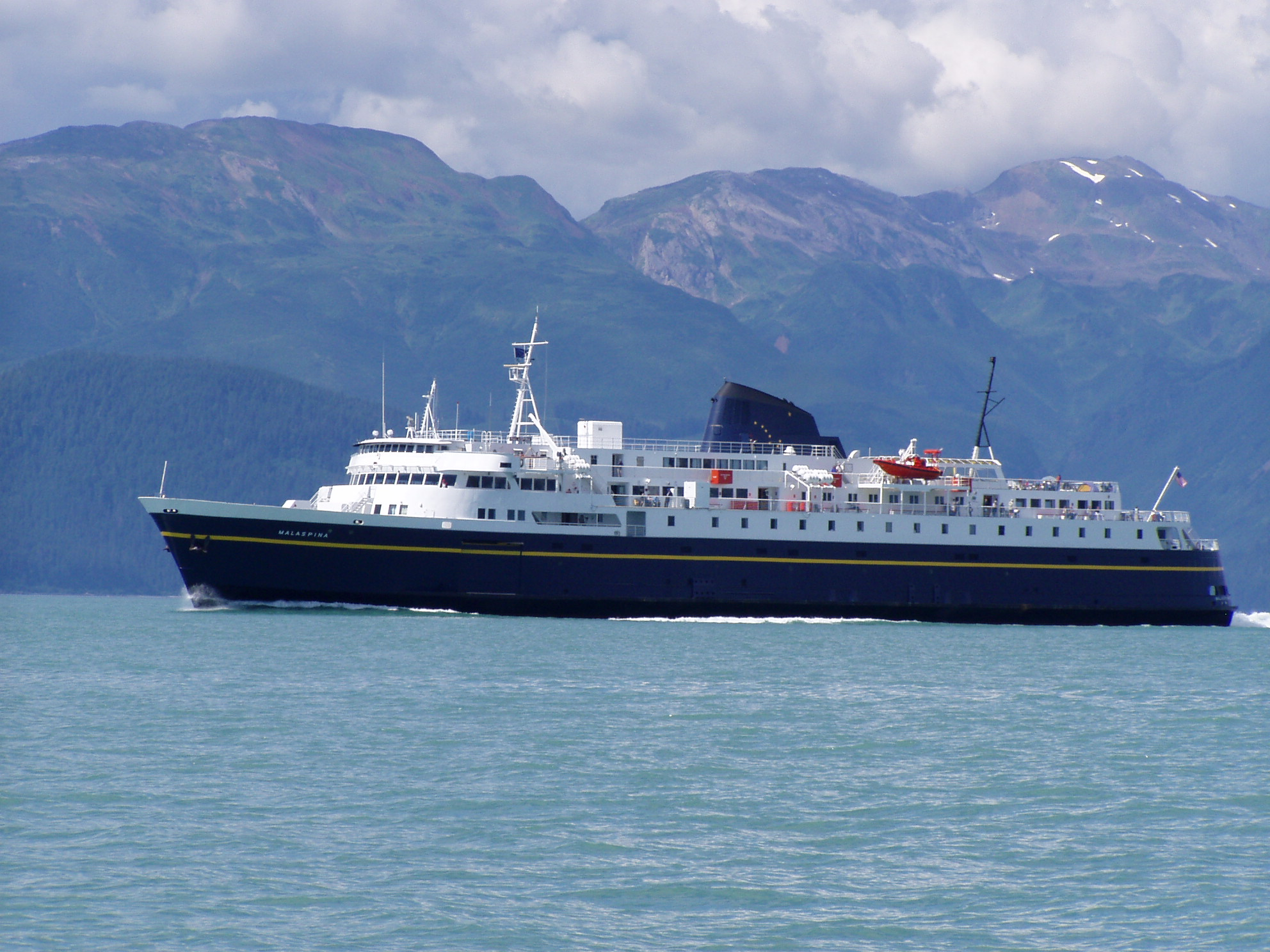
- M/V Malaspina

History
- Name: Malaspina
- Namesake: Malaspina Glacier, Yakutat, Alaska
- Owner: Alaska Marine Highway System
- Port of registry: United States
- Builder: Lockheed Shipbuilding, Seattle, Washington
- Launched: 1963
- Decommissioned: December 2019
- Out of service: June 1, 2022
- Refit: 1972
- Home port: Juneau, Alaska
- Identification: IMO number: 5218183; MMSI number: 367143000; Callsign: WI6803

General characteristics
- Class & type: Malaspina-class mainline ferry
- Displacement: 5,552 long tons (5,641 t)
- Length: 408 ft (124 m)
- Beam: 74 ft (23 m)
- Draft: 16 ft 9.96 in (5.1298 m)
- Decks: One vehicle deck
- Ramps: Aft, port, and starboard ro-ro loading
- Installed power: 8,000 hp (5,966 kW)
- Speed: 16.5 knots (30.6 km/h; 19.0 mph)
- Capacity: 500 passengers; 88 vehicles

MV Malaspina, colloquially known as the Mal, is a mainline ROPAX ferry and the original Malaspina-class vessel for the Alaska Marine Highway System. Malaspina is named after the Malaspina Glacier, which, in turn, is named after Captain Don Alessandro Malaspina, an Italian navigator and explorer who explored the northwest coast of North America in 1791. Malaspina is nearly identical to her sister ship, MV Matanuska.

Malaspina was designed by Philip F. Spaulding and Associates, constructed in 1963 at the Lockheed Shipbuilding yards in Seattle, Washington, and elongated in 1972 at the Willamette Iron and Steel Company in Portland, Oregon. As a mainline ferry, she served the larger of the Inside Passage communities, such as Ketchikan, Petersburg, and Sitka, but her route spanned the entirety of the Inside Passage, beginning runs in either Bellingham, Washington, or Prince Rupert, British Columbia, Canada, and running to the northernmost Alaskan Panhandle community of Skagway. From the late 1990s until being laid up in 2019, Malaspina operated mostly during the summers as a "dayboat" in the upper Lynn Canal, making daily round trips between Juneau and Skagway with stops in Haines.

Malaspina's amenities included a hot-food cafeteria, a solarium, forward, aft, movie, and business lounges, 54 four-berth cabins, and 29 two-berth cabins. She formerly had a gift shop, but it was closed in 2014 as a cost-saving measure.

On June 1, 2022, the Alaska Department of Transportation & Public Facilities announced that the Malaspina would be retired to Ketchikan, having been sold to M/V Malaspina, LLC for $128,250. The ship will be permanently moored in Ward Cove, to be used as "worker housing and a potential maritime museum, and hopefully a training platform for students working towards a career in the maritime industry."

== See also ==
- Malaspina Expedition
