= Nanoose Bay =

- Location of Nanoose Bay' in British Columbia Nanoose Bay (British Columbia)
- Coordinates: 49°15′N 124°11′W
- Country: Canada
- Province: British Columbia
- Regional district: Nanaimo

Population (2016)
  - Total: 5,919
- Time zone: UTC−07:00 (PT)
- Area codes: 250, 778, 236, & 672

Nanoose Bay is a community on the east coast of southern Vancouver Island, British Columbia, Canada. The location off BC Highway 19 is by road about 26 kilometres (16 mi) north of Nanaimo, and 16 kilometres (10 mi) south of Parksville.

== Name origin ==
In 1862, John Enos (Joao Ignacio) became the first European settler on the Nanoose Bay Peninsula. The bay was spelled Noonooa on an 1864 map. The current anglicized spelling was adopted by the early 1870s.

The Nanoose First Nation called the peninsula Berry Point. In the early 1800s, a rival tribe massacred many members, who were berry picking. A child survivor was later known as "Nanoose Bob".

== Nanoose Bay settlement ==
The Nanoose Bay community was formerly called Arlington after the Arlington Hotel, the post office name from 1906, until adopting Nanoose Bay in 1916.

In 1957, Yvonne and John Ruggles opened a store on the hill in the Qualicum National Wildlife Area. The modern retail and commercial centre on Collins Cres is called the Red Gap Centre. A firehall, library, and elementary school are located nearby on Northwest Bay Road.

== Railway ==
Around 1910, the Nanoose Bay train station opened, and was a flag stop when Via Rail on Vancouver Island ceased in 2011. Adjacent stops were about 18 kilometres (11 mi) south to Wellington, and 11 kilometres (7 mi) north to Parksville. At the railway crossing on Nanoose Beach Rd, not even a signpost marked the flag stop location in its final years.

== Neighbouring settlements ==
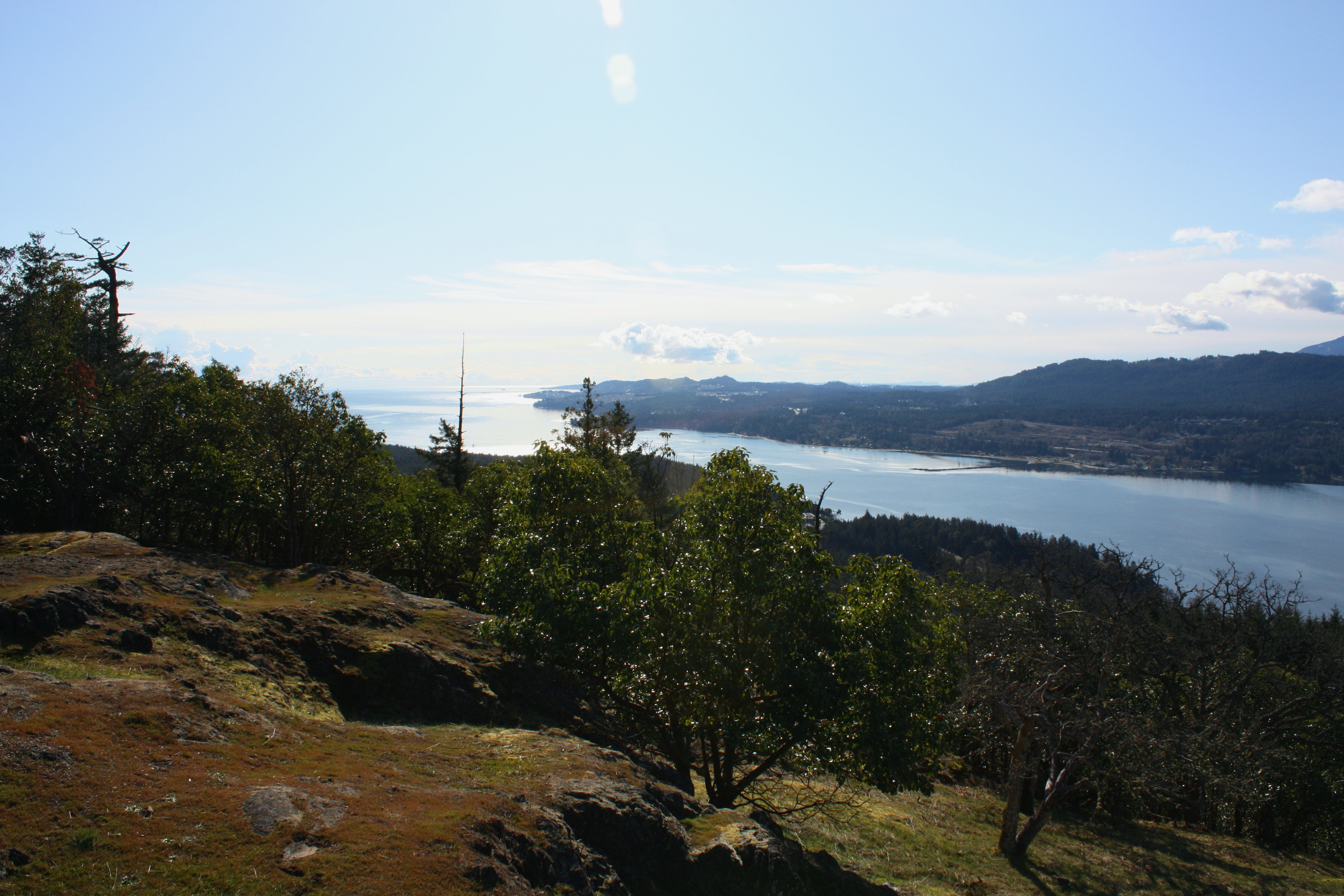
View of Nanoose Bay from Notch Hill

Along NW Bay Rd, was the community of Brynmarl (south of Sanders Rd intersection), which had a post office (1886–1935), stage stop, and train station. The Rocking Horse Pub lies among rural holdings.

In 1911, along today's Powder Point Rd, the peninsula was called "Powder Point" when the Giant Powder Company established a plant, community, and a 4.8-kilometre (3 mi) narrow gauge railway that connected the complex. In 1918, an explosion caused extensive damage, and the plant relocated in 1925.

Near the point, at Brickyard Cove, a brick plant existed in 1911. Clay came from the grounds of the present golf course. Bricks intertwine the roots of giant trees in Brickyard Park. At Dolphin Beach, the Fairwinds Schooner Cove Marina has 360 berths.

The ghost town of Red Gap, which was the site of the Straits Lumber Mill 1912–1942, is southeast along the highway.

== Military test range ==
The Canadian Forces Maritime Experimental Test Range (CFMETR) is in a restricted area at the wharf terminus of Powder Point Rd. The joint Canadian-American testing facility for torpedoes and other naval warfare and listening equipment has operated since 1965. During the 1970s and 1980s, a protest camp along the highway targeted the facility.
