= Habegger Maschinenfabrik AG =

Swiss engineering company

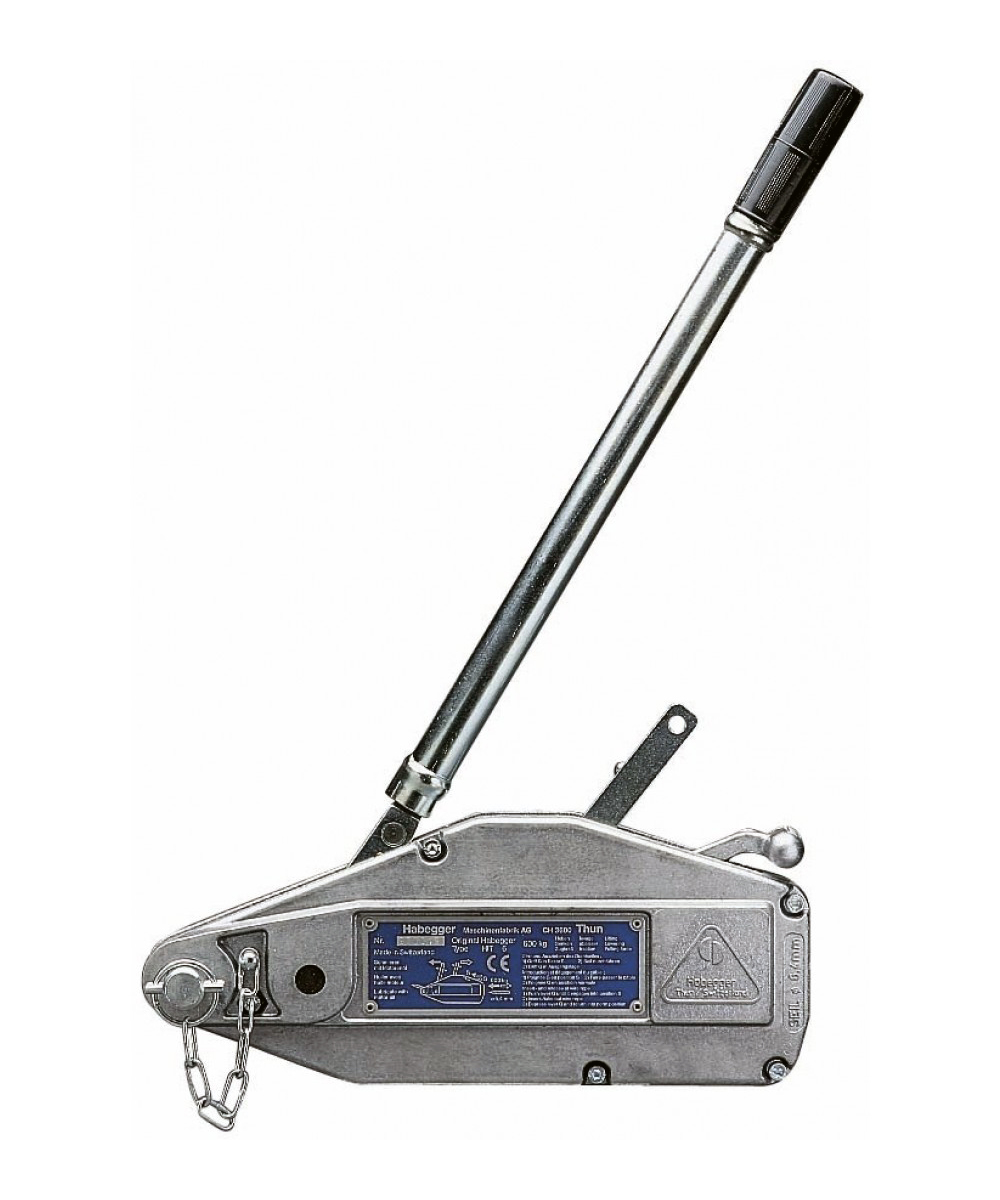
The Habegger hand winch

Habegger Maschinenfabrik AG was an engineering company based in the Swiss city of Thun. It was founded by Willy Habegger in 1943. In 1951, the Habegger company introduced a hand-operated cable winch, for which the name Habegger has become synonymous.

For the 1964 Swiss National Exhibition, held in Lausanne, Habegger built the Télécanapé and the Minirail. The Minirail was further developed for use at the 1967 World's Fair, held in the Canadian city of Montreal. The system was subsequently installed at several other locations, with the system at the California State Fair, in the US city of Sacramento, still in use.

In the years up to 1980, the company built over 500 aerial tramways, gondola lifts, chair lifts, and ski lifts. In that year, a liqidity crisis resulted in the company being taken over by the Bern Cantonal Bank, who sold the cable car business to Von Roll, which was later acquired by the Doppelmayr/Garaventa Group. Willy Habegger bought back the original cable winch business, which continued to operate as Habegger Maschinenfabrik AG.

In 1993, Willy's son Peter Habegger took over the business. In 2016, Jakob AG acquired the company, and now manufacture and sell the cable winches, albeit still branded as Habegger. The factory was relocated from Thun to Jakob's site in the Swiss town of Trubschachen.
