= Pacific Salmon Commission =

- Abbreviation: PSC
- Formation: 1937
- Headquarters: Vancouver, British Columbia
- Location: 600 - 1155 Robson Street
- Region served: Canada and the United States
- Chair: Phil Anderson
- Website: https://www.psc.org

The Pacific Salmon Commission is a regulatory body run jointly by the Canadian and United States governments. Its mandate is to protect stocks of the five species of Pacific salmon. Its precursor was the International Pacific Salmon Fisheries Commission, which operated from 1937 to 1985. The Commission enforces the Pacific Salmon Treaty, which was ratified by Canada and the United States in 1985.

== Origins ==
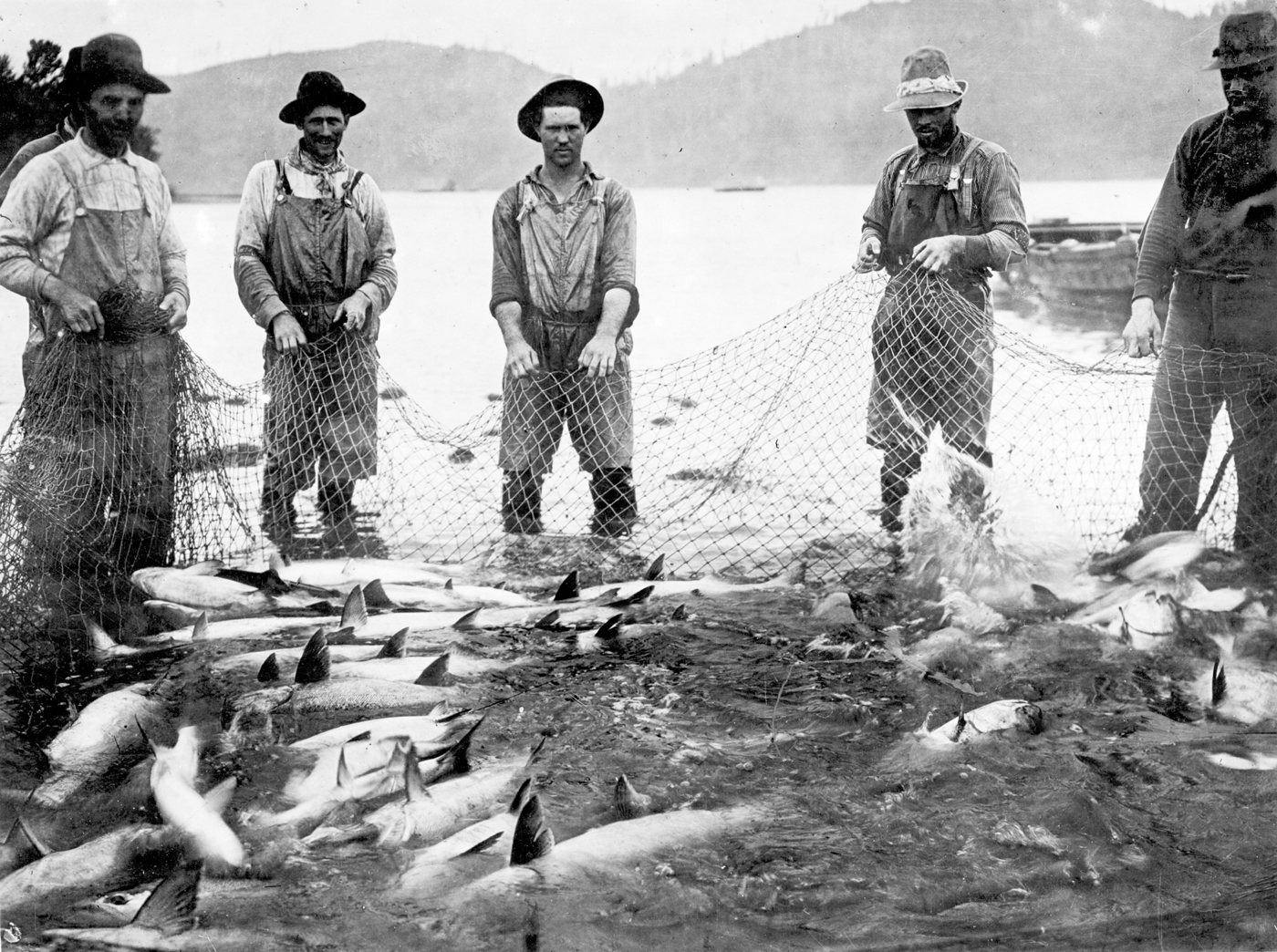
Seining salmon on the Columbia River, 1914

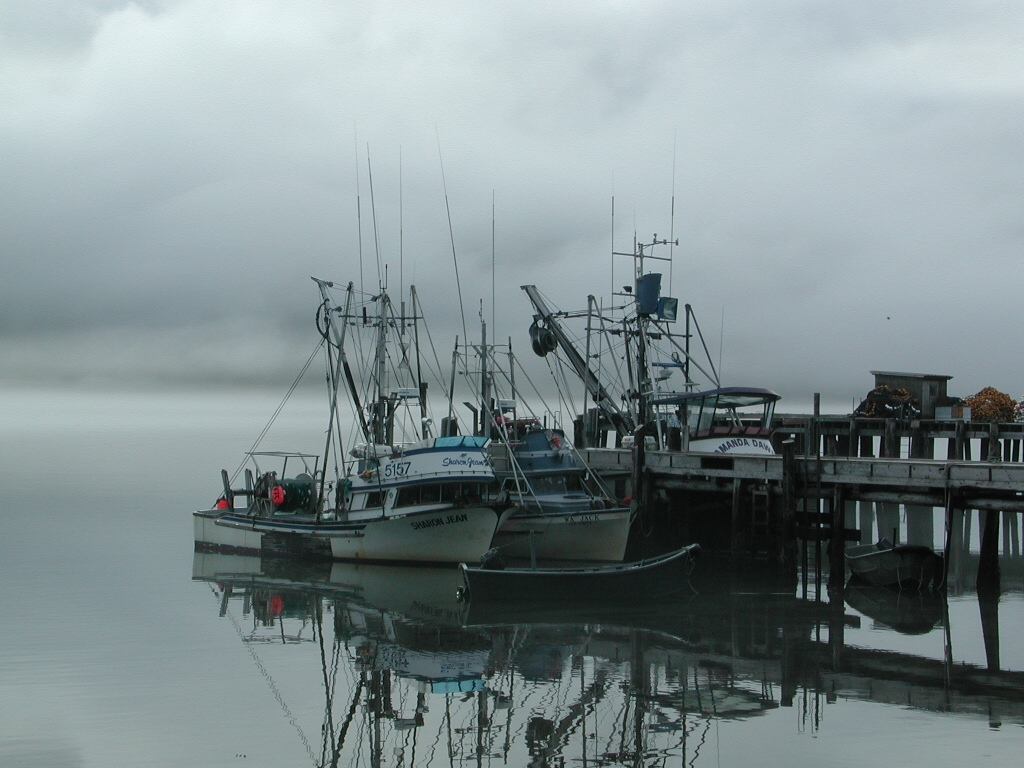
Salmon seiners docked at False Pass, Alaska

Pacific salmon have been an important food source and trade commodity for Northwest First Nations peoples for millennia. After European explorers arrived, the first large-scale commercial salmon fisheries were started in the early 1800s. Lucrative fisheries were established on the Columbia and Fraser Rivers, including canneries geared for export. Harvests increased year-to-year until the 1910s. The abundance of the resource had precluded any disagreements between the Canadian and American governments until this point.

However, from the 1920s onward, stocks began to decline, a result of overfishing and the degradation and the obstruction of migratory rivers. Competition between American and Canadian fisheries for the dwindling resource led to conflict. Disputes were complicated by the fact that the salmon crossed several international borders during their lifespan. In 1930, the governments met and proposed the Fraser River Convention to regulate fishing and mitigate environmental damage to salmon habitats. The International Pacific Salmon Fisheries Commission was formally founded in 1937.

== International Pacific Salmon Fisheries Commission ==
The early focus of the International Pacific Salmon Fisheries Commission was to restore the Fraser runs of sockeye salmon. Three obstacles were identified: the Hells Gate portion of the Fraser Canyon (where a landslide in 1913 caused by railway engineers had partially blocked the river), the Quesnel River splash dam, and the Adams River splash dam. During the 1940s, fish ladders and spillways were constructed by the Commission at Hell's Gate. The splash dams on the Quesnel and Adams were dynamited and removed.

== Pacific Salmon Treaty ==
By the 1970s, cooperation between the two governments in setting fishing quotas had faltered. In 1982, a comprehensive treaty was signed and was fully ratified in 1985. It limited catches of Alaska, Fraser, and Columbia salmon to pre-set quotas and committed the governments to improving the spawning capacities of the region's rivers. The treaty was amended in 1999.

== Structure ==
The PSC is divided into five panels. The Northern Panel covers Alaska and northern British Columbia stocks. The Fraser River Panel covers the Fraser, and the Southern Panel is responsible for the Columbia and other U.S. stocks. The Yukon and Transboundary Panels monitor stock in the Yukon River, and stock in rivers crossing through British Columbia and the Alaska panhandle respectively. Each panel monitors harvesting, spawning, and habitat quality in its respective region and then makes recommendations to the Commission. These recommendations determine seasonal fishing quotas and openings.
