= Green Chain (sawmill) =

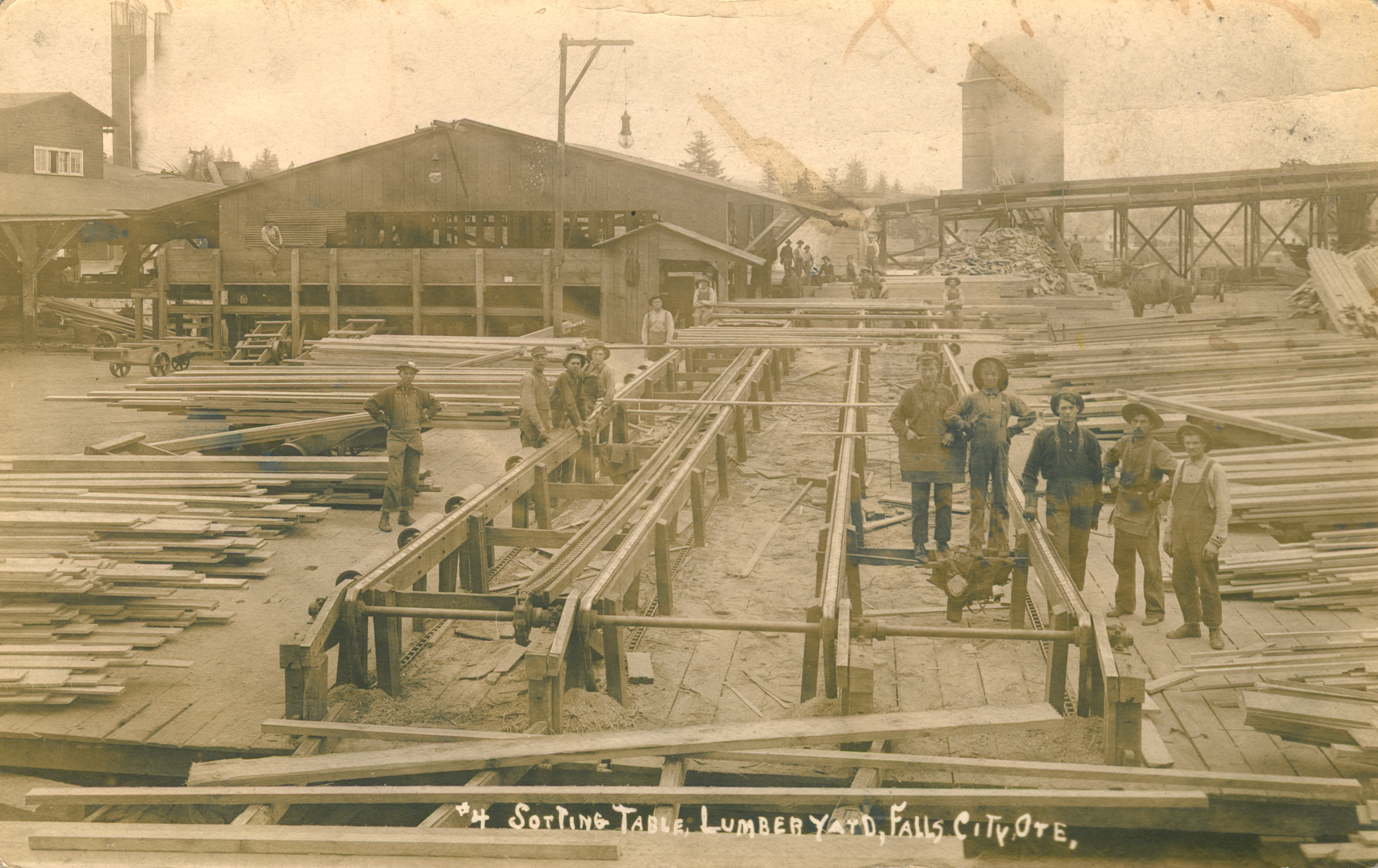
Lumber yard green chain or sorting table, Falls City, Oregon

A green chain is a type of lumber delivery system that can be used in a sawmill. The green chain's purpose is to collect the final product of the mill and move it at a controlled rate to be graded and sorted. In the 19th and early to late 20th century, the green chain was used by people. Men would stand alongside and pull lumber that matches the required dimensions and place it in piles. In short, the workers sorted the lumber. Modern sawmills use automatic systems, such as the lumber dropping through the chain into large slings, where it can be picked up and moved to a staging area to dry. Most likely called the green chain because the lumber is green and has not been seasoned.
