= Chenega =

Chenega may refer to:

== Places in the United States ==
- Chenega, Alaska, a community
- Chenega Bay, Alaska, a community
- Chenega Glacier, a glacier on Prince William Sound
- Chenega Island, an island in Prince William Sound

== Vessels ==
- MV Chenega, an Alaska Marine Highway System vessel

== See also ==
- Chengara, Kerala, India
