= Fairweather =

Fairweather or Fair Weather may refer to:.

== People ==
- Fairweather (surname)

== Music ==
- Fairweather (band), an American indie rock band
- Fair Weather (band), a British pop group from 1970 to 1971
- Fair Weather (album), 2000, by Alison Brown
- "Fair Weather", a track on the 2018 album The Light Is Leaving Us All by Current 93

== Places ==
- Fairweather Glacier, Glacier Bay National Park, Alaska, US
- Fairweather Range, unofficial name of a mountain range in Alaska and British Columbia, Canada
- Mount Fairweather, on the border between Alaska and British Columbia
- Mount Fairweather (Antarctica)
- Cape Fairweather, on the coast of Graham Land, British Antarctic Territory

== Ships ==
- MV Fairweather, a fast ferry for the Alaska Marine Highway System
- NOAAS Fairweather (S 220), formerly USC&GS Fairweather, a research ship in service in the US Coast and Geodetic Survey from 1968 to 1970 and in the US National Oceanic and Atmospheric Administration from 1970 to 1989 and since 2004

== Other uses ==
- Fairweather (store), a Canadian women's fashion chain formerly owned by Dylex
- Fair Weather, a 2002 compilation of comics by Joe Matt
