= Chenega Glacier =

Glacier in Alaska, United States

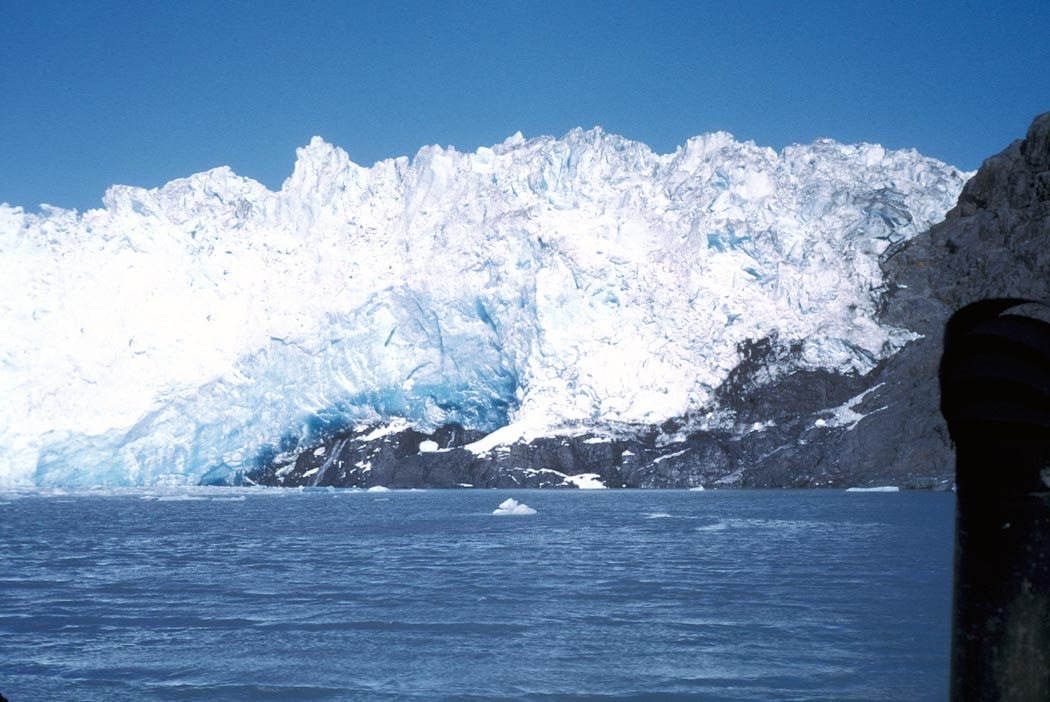

- Location within Alaska
- Interactive map of Chenega Glacier
- Type: Tidewater glacier
- Location: Chugach Census Area, Alaska, U.S.
- Coordinates: 60°14′40″N 148°28′24″W
- Length: 12 m (39 ft)
- Terminus: Ocean (Nassau Fjord)
- Status: Retreating

Chenega Glacier is a tidewater glacier located in Prince William Sound and on the Kenai Peninsula in the U.S. state of Alaska.

Chenega Glacier was named in 1905 for Chenega Island and the nearby community of Chenega Bay. The glacier is a tourist attraction, drawing many kayakers and small cruise lines to Nassau Fjord where the glacier meets the ocean. Most individual expeditions to the glacier originate in the Prince William Sound community of Whittier. The Chenega Glacier finds its source in the Sargent Icefield.

The glacier is the namesake of the Alaska Marine Highway fast ferry MV Chenega.

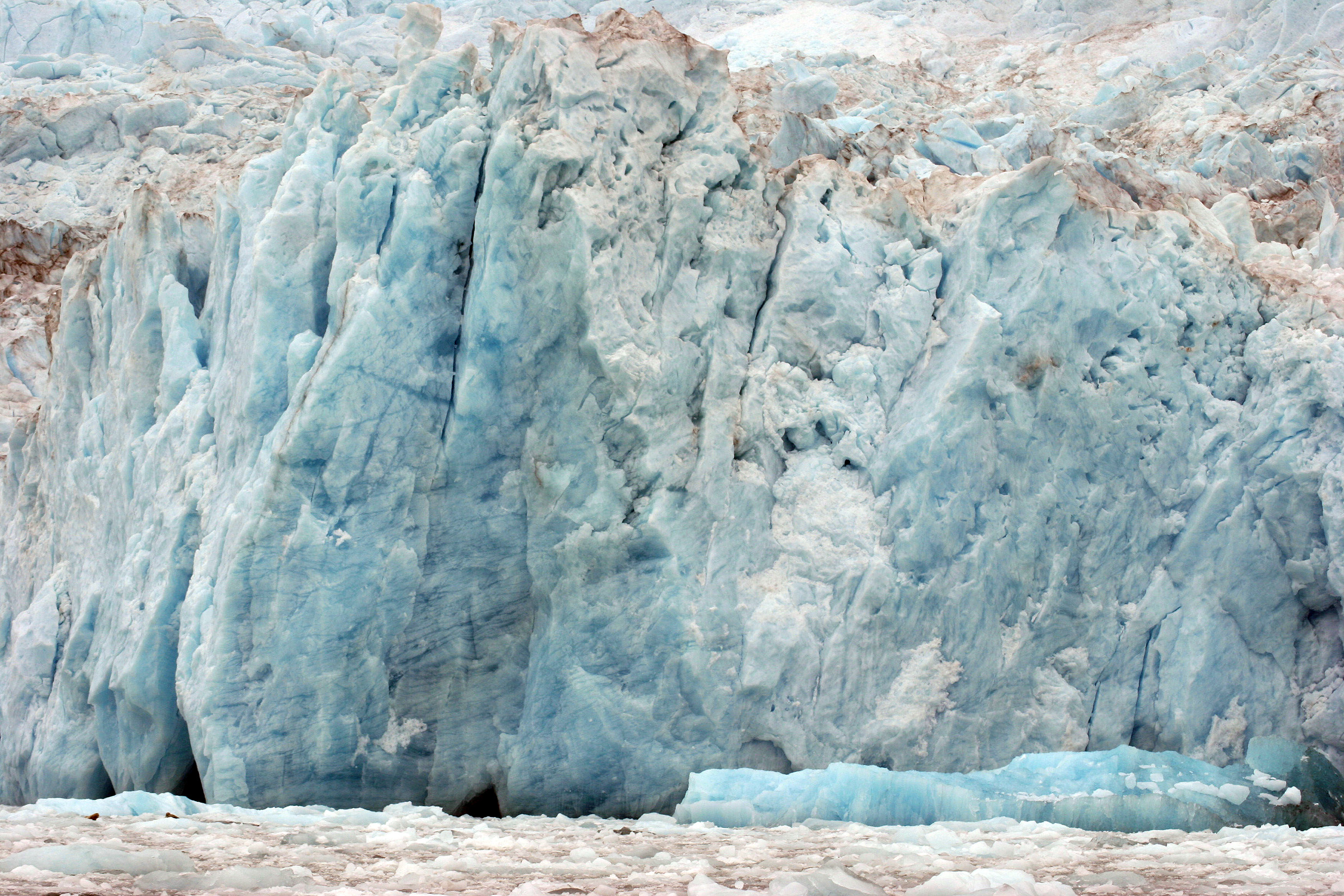
Closeup of the glacier

== See also ==
- List of glaciers
