= Mount Cameron (Alaska) =

Mountain in Alaska, United States

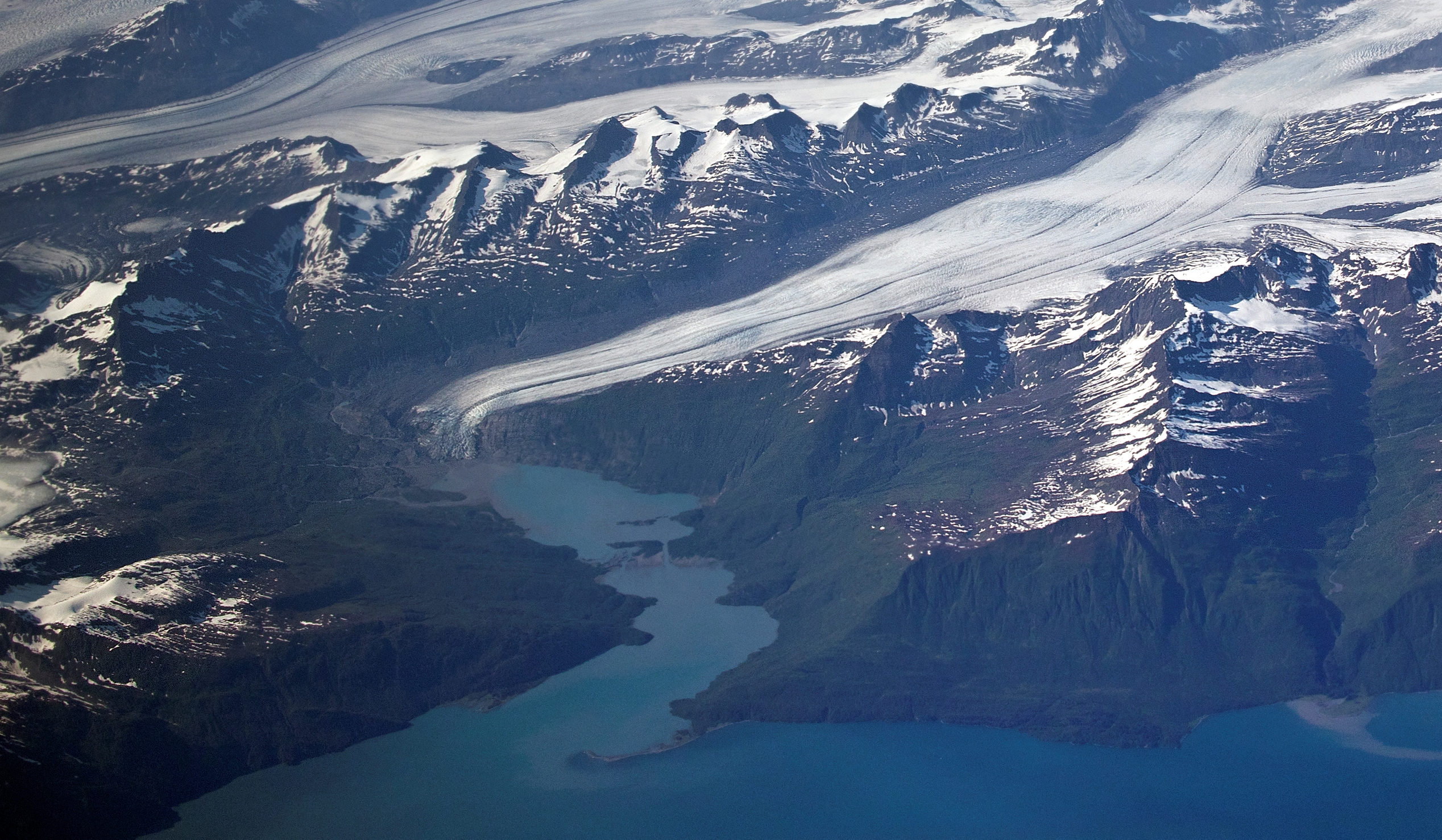
- Mt. Cameron centered near top of frame (Mount Hogan to right of Shoup Glacier)

Highest point
- Elevation: 5,360 ft (1,630 m)
- Prominence: 1,210 ft (370 m)
- Isolation: 4.5 mi (7.2 km)
- Coordinates: 61°12′39″N 146°39′45″W

Geography
- Location within Alaska
- Location: Chugach Census Area; Alaska, United States
- Parent range: Chugach Mountains
- Topo map: USGS Valdez A-8

Mount Cameron is a 5,360-foot (1,634 m) mountain summit located in the Chugach Mountains, in the U.S. state of Alaska. The peak is situated 15 mi (24 km) west-northwest of Valdez, Alaska, on the boundary of Chugach National Forest. Although modest in elevation, relief is significant since the southern aspect of the mountain rises up from the tidewater of Prince William Sound's Shoup Bay in approximately 4.4 miles. The mountain takes its name from local prospectors as reported in 1912 by the U.S. Geological Survey.

== Climate ==
Based on the Köppen climate classification, Mount Cameron is located in a subarctic climate zone with long, cold, snowy winters, and mild summers. Weather systems coming off the Gulf of Alaska are forced upwards by the Chugach Mountains (orographic lift), causing heavy precipitation in the form of rainfall and snowfall. Temperatures can drop below −20 °C with wind chill factors below −30 °C. This climate supports the Shoup Glacier on the east aspect, and immense Columbia Glacier to the west.

== See also ==
- List of mountain peaks of Alaska
- Geography of Alaska
