= Nassau Fjord =

Fjord in Prince William Sound, Alaska

Coordinates: 60°15′46″N 148°21′25″W

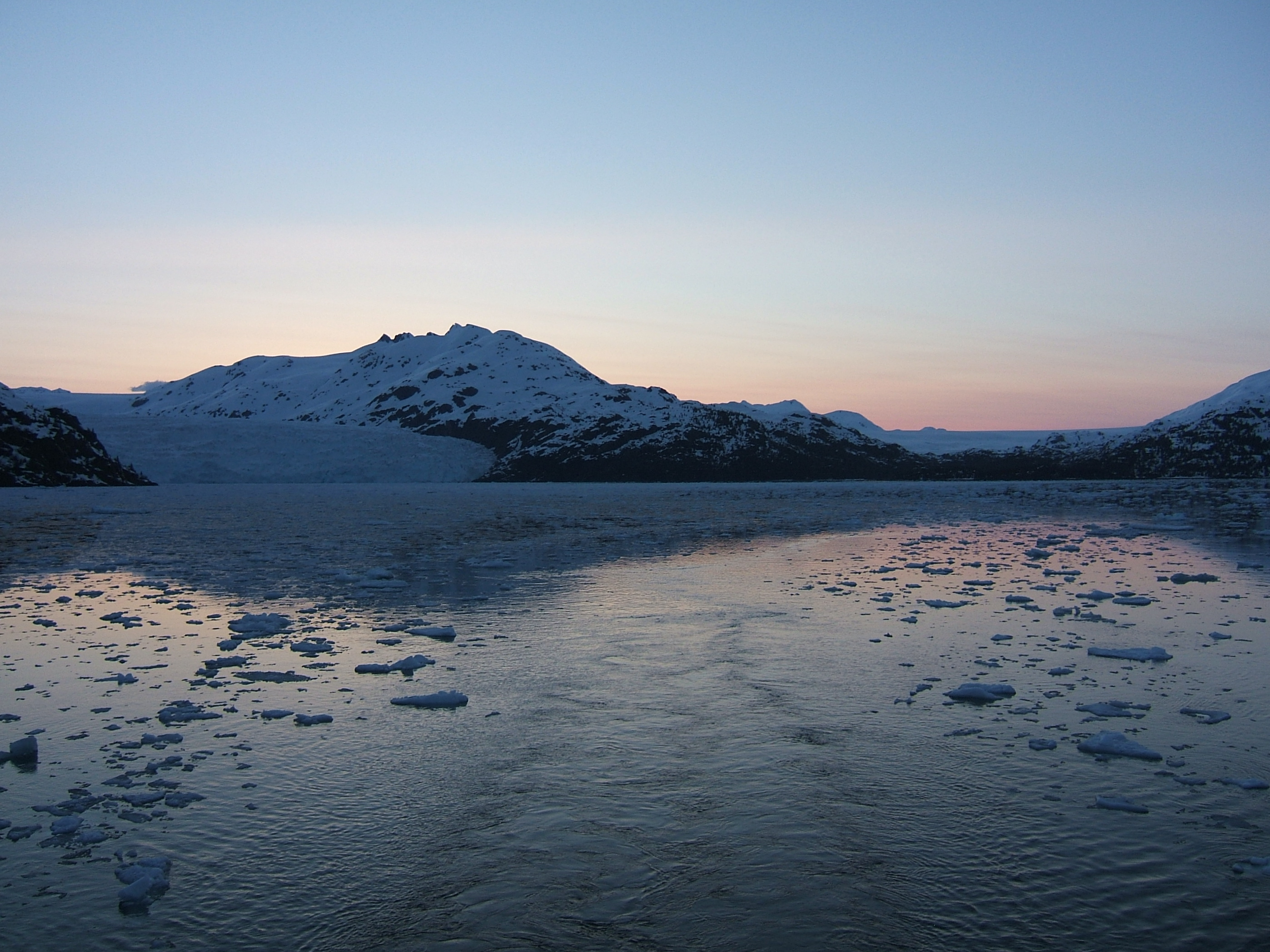
Nassau Fjord at sunset

Nassau Fjord or Nassau Fiord is a four mile long inlet in Alaska branching off from Prince William Sound. Nassau Fjord is glacially carved and also home to the famous tidewater Chenega Glacier which shares a two mile long calving face with the Fjord. The Princeton and Tigertail Glaciers both come terminate within one mile of the fjord's waters as well.

Due to the large amount of glacial activity in the fjord, it is a popular destination for many kayakers and boaters and features many icebergs. Most trips to the fjord leave from nearby Chenega or Whittier.
