= Mount Hogan =

Mountain in Alaska, United States

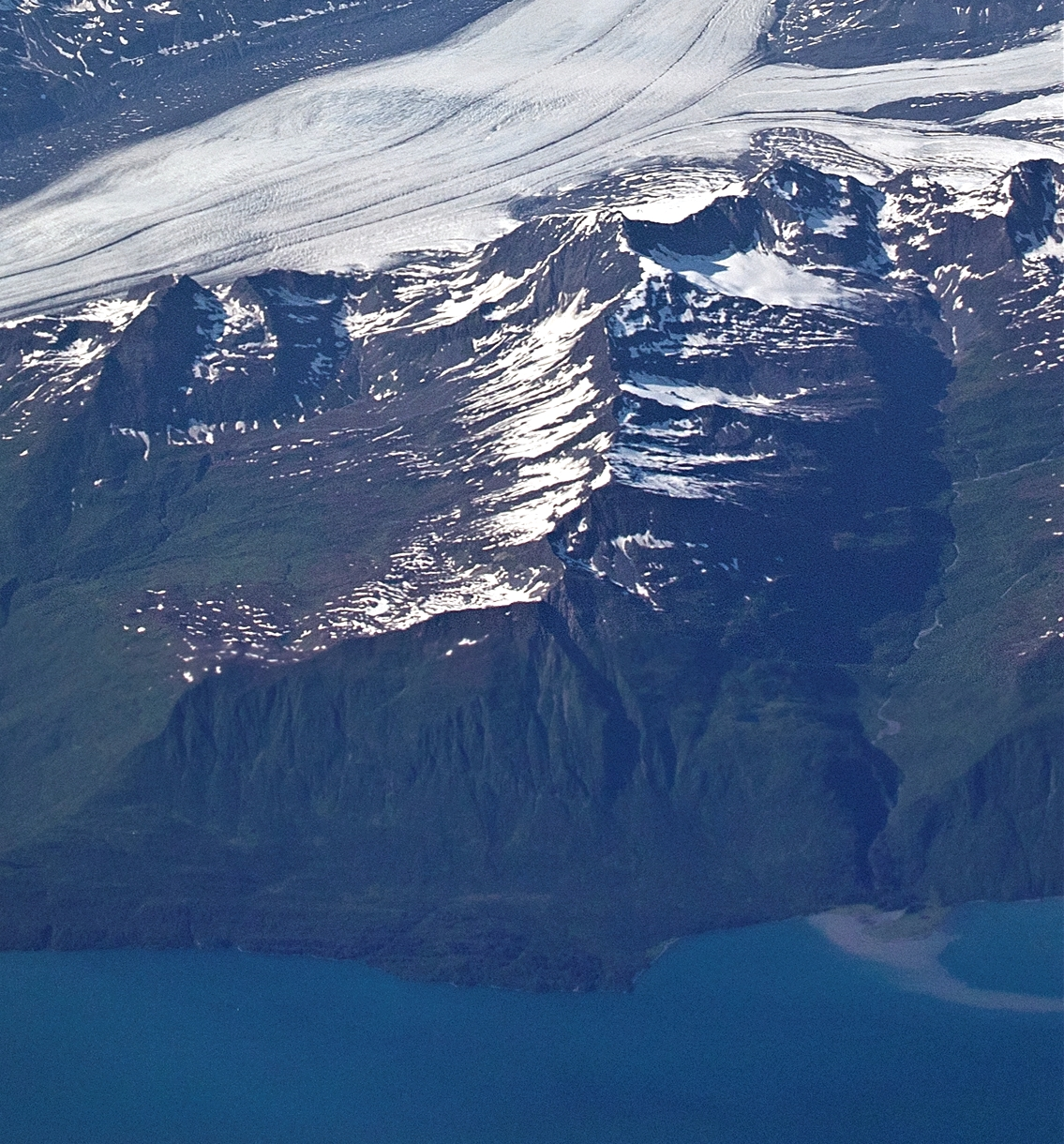
- Mt. Hogan aerial from south

Highest point
- Elevation: 5,453 ft (1,662 m)
- Prominence: 1,203 ft (367 m)
- Isolation: 3.24 mi (5.21 km)
- Coordinates: 61°10′32″N 146°30′41″W

Geography
- Location within Alaska
- Location: Chugach Census Area; Alaska, United States
- Parent range: Chugach Mountains
- Topo map: USGS Valdez A-7

Mount Hogan is a 5,453-foot (1,662 m) mountain summit located in the Chugach Mountains, in the U.S. state of Alaska. The peak is situated 10.5 mi (17 km) northwest of Valdez, Alaska, and 6 mi (10 km) southeast of Mount Cameron. Although modest in elevation, relief is significant since the southern aspect of the mountain rises up from the tidewater of Prince William Sound's Port Valdez in approximately 3.4 miles. The mountain takes its name from local prospectors as reported in 1911 by the U.S. Geological Survey.

== Climate ==
Based on the Köppen climate classification, Mount Hogan is located in a subarctic climate zone with long, cold, snowy winters, and mild summers. Weather systems coming off the Gulf of Alaska are forced upwards by the Chugach Mountains (orographic lift), causing heavy precipitation in the form of rainfall and snowfall. Temperatures can drop below −20 °C with wind chill factors below −30 °C. This climate supports an unnamed glacier in the east cirque, as well as the immense Shoup Glacier on the north aspect.

== See also ==
- List of mountain peaks of Alaska
- Geography of Alaska
