= Ellamar Mountain =

Mountain in Alaska, United States

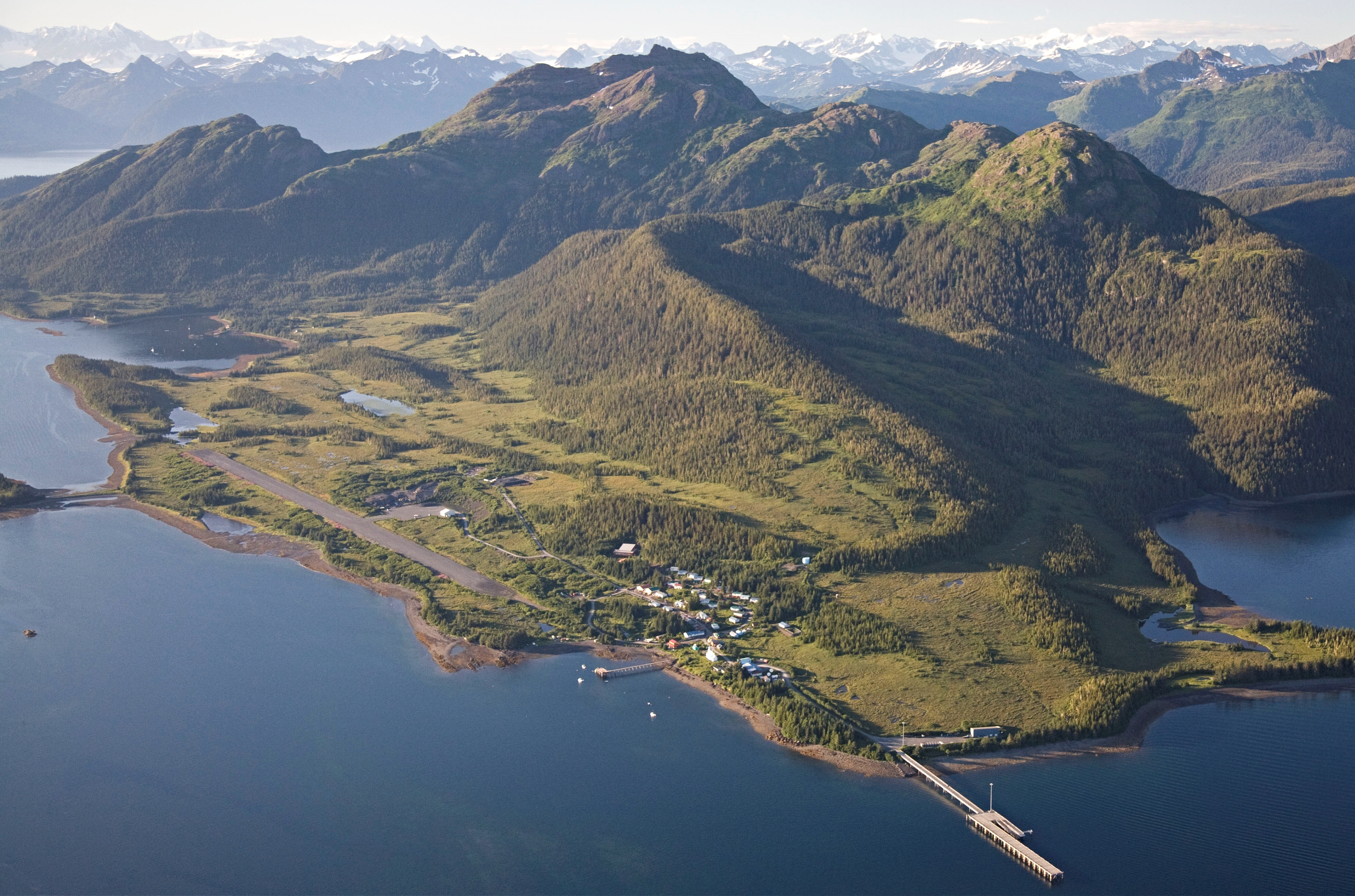
- Ellamar Mountain, south aspect (Tatitlek down in front)

Highest point
- Elevation: 3,051 ft (930 m)
- Prominence: 2,851 ft (869 m)
- Parent peak: Copper Mountain
- Isolation: 4.36 mi (7.02 km)
- Coordinates: 60°54′55″N 146°40′17″W

Geography
- Location within Alaska
- Interactive map of Ellamar Mountain
- Location: Chugach Census Area; Alaska, United States
- Parent range: Chugach Mountains
- Topo map: USGS Cordova D-8

Ellamar Mountain is a prominent 3,051-foot (930 m) mountain summit located in the Chugach Mountains, in the U.S. state of Alaska. It is situated 42 mi (68 km) northwest of Cordova, 18 mi (29 km) southwest of Valdez, and 3 mi (5 km) north of Tatitlek, on land managed by Chugach National Forest. It is approximately 9 mi (14 km) northeast of Bligh Reef, the location of the 1989 Exxon Valdez oil spill. The mountain's local name was taken from the copper mining camp of "Ellamar" at the southwest base of the mountain. In turn, Ellamar is a portmanteau of Ella and Margaret. When a post office was established for this new mining camp, C. L. Wayland, the first Postal Inspector for the Territory of Alaska and parts of the Pacific Northwest, coined Ellamar from the names of his wife, Ella, and daughter, Margaret. Precipitation runoff from the mountain drains into Prince William Sound.

== Climate ==
Based on the Köppen climate classification, Ellamar Mountain is located in a subarctic climate zone with long, cold, snowy winters, and cool summers. Weather systems coming off the Gulf of Alaska are forced upwards by the Chugach Mountains (orographic lift), causing heavy precipitation in the form of rainfall and snowfall. Temperatures can drop below −20 °C with wind chill factors below −30 °C. The months May through June offer the most favorable weather for viewing and climbing.

== See also ==
- List of mountain peaks of Alaska
- Geography of Alaska
