= Evans Island =

Island in southern Alaska, U.S.

Coordinates: 60°03′19″N 148°05′19″W

Evans Island is an island in the Prince William Sound of southern Alaska. It lies just east of Bainbridge Island across the Prince of Wales Passage. Elrington Island lies to its south, Latouche Island to its southeast, and Knight Island to its northeast. Although Evans Island had been inhabited up to the time of the Russian exploration of Alaska, the island had no modern-day inhabitants until 1984, when a group of residents and former residents of the original Alutiq village of Chenega, on Chenega Island, decided to build the village of Chenega Bay on Crab Bay on Evans Island. Old Chenega had been destroyed and one-third of its residents had been killed by the tsunami from the 1964 Alaska earthquake. The new community of Chenega is coextensive with Evans Island, which has a land area of 74.605 km^{2} (28.805 sq mi) and a population of 86 persons as of the 2000 census.

Evans Island and the ocean around it was polluted by the 1989 Exxon Valdez oil spill.

Evans Island was called Hoodoo Island before 1912. The name frightened some sailors. The United States Coast and Geodetic Survey renamed the island in honor of United States Navy Admiral Robley Evans (1846–1912), who had been a maritime policeman in the area early in his career.

Climate data for Port San Juan, Alaska (1980–2005 normals)
Month	Jan	Feb	Mar	Apr	May	Jun	Jul	Aug	Sep	Oct	Nov	Dec	Year
Mean daily maximum °F (°C)	34.9 (1.6)	35.1 (1.7)	38.1 (3.4)	43.3 (6.3)	51.8 (11.0)	59.2 (15.1)	61.9 (16.6)	62.0 (16.7)	54.6 (12.6)	45.6 (7.6)	38.5 (3.6)	36.4 (2.4)	46.8 (8.2)
Mean daily minimum °F (°C)	26.2 (−3.2)	25.9 (−3.4)	27.9 (−2.3)	31.4 (−0.3)	37.1 (2.8)	44.0 (6.7)	49.5 (9.7)	49.2 (9.6)	42.7 (5.9)	34.8 (1.6)	28.8 (−1.8)	27.4 (−2.6)	35.4 (1.9)
Average precipitation inches (mm)	13.72 (348)	11.08 (281)	8.73 (222)	9.42 (239)	6.59 (167)	4.74 (120)	4.79 (122)	9.01 (229)	15.01 (381)	17.23 (438)	13.39 (340)	17.23 (438)	130.94 (3,325)
Average snowfall inches (cm)	21.2 (54)	22.5 (57)	16.0 (41)	6.1 (15)	0.5 (1.3)	0.0 (0.0)	0.0 (0.0)	0.0 (0.0)	0.0 (0.0)	1.7 (4.3)	12.5 (32)	22.3 (57)	102.8 (261.6)
Source: WRCC "PORT SAN JUAN, ALASKA, Period of Record General Climate Summary". Western Regional Climate Center. Retrieved 2019-06-04.
