= Chugach School District =

School district in Anchorage, Alaska

Address
- 9312 Vanguard Drive Ste 100 Anchorage, Alaska, 99507; United States

District information
- Grades: Pre-kindergarten – 12
- Superintendent: Ty Mase
- NCES District ID: 0200800

Students and staff
- Enrollment: 617 (2024–25)
- Teachers: 17.85 (on an FTE basis)
- Staff: 18.35 (on an FTE basis)
- Student–teacher ratio: 34.57

Other information
- Website: www.chugachschooldistrict.com

The Chugach School District is a school district headquartered in Anchorage, Alaska. The district's territory is in the Chugach Census Area, where it covers all areas except for Cordova and Valdez. It operates three brick-and-mortar schools in Prince William Sound; a homeschool program that serves students across the state; and a short-term residential school out of Anchorage.

The three brick-and-mortar schools of Chenega Bay, Tatitlek, and Whittier encompass an area 22,000 square miles (57,000 km^{2}) across South Central Alaska.

== Schools ==
- Chenega Bay

Chenega Bay Community School is located in the Southwest region of Prince William Sound, on Evan's Island. It is part of the Alaska Native Village of Chenega Bay. This school is the smallest in the Chugach School District, with 15 students enrolled for the 2020–2021 school year.

- Tatitlek

Tatitlek Community School is located in the Northeast region of Prince William Sound, in the 90-person community of the Alaska Native Village of Tatitlek. This school has about 19 students enrolled for the 2020–2021 school year.

- Whittier

Whittier Community School is located in Northwestern Prince William Sound, in the 280-person community of Whittier. This is the largest of Chugach's brick-and-mortar schools, with about 55 students enrolled for the 2020–2021 school year.

- FOCUS Homeschool

Chugach's homeschool program, FOCUS Homeschool, has main offices in Anchorage, Fairbanks, and Valdez that serve families across the state. The majority of Chugach's students are part of the homeschool program. There were approximately 608 students enrolled in FOCUS Homeschool for the 2020–2021 school year.

- Voyage to Excellence

The Voyage to Excellence (VTE) Program is a residential school that provides students with opportunities to apply what they have learned in school to real life situations. There are phases of varying lengths, from 6 days to a month, that have specific focuses. During these phases, students gain skills and training in various life skills, personal development, social development, service training, urban/city life familiarization, leadership, and career development. The mission of VTE is to provide youth with the skills and knowledge necessary to make a successful transition from school to life, which they accomplish through over 70 partnerships with schools and businesses.

== History ==
The Chugach School District underwent major changes starting in 1994. The district went from the bottom quartile in Alaska to, just five years after rebuilding their education system, the top quartile. This began with two years of input-gathering from communities and businesses.

== Performance-based education ==
Chugach is recognized as being one of the longest-running, public performance-based school districts. This model is described as a "reversal" of the traditional education equation. Instead of time being the constant and learning being the variable, as in the traditional system, learning is the constant and time is the variable.

== Awards ==
In 2001, the Chugach School District became the first educational institution to earn the prestigious Malcolm Baldrige National Quality Award offered by the National Institute of Standards and Technology (NIST).

In 2008, Chugach School District won the Alaska Performance Excellence (APEX) award of quality.

In 2021, Chugach School District's Fairbanks based agricultural education program, Silent Springs FFA, was recognized as 3-Star premier chapter as well as a top 10 National finalist by the National FFA Organization.
