= Bainbridge Island (Alaska) =

Island in Alaska, USA

Coordinates: 60.107774°N 148.150652°W

Bainbridge Island is an island in Prince William Sound, Alaska, United States. It is located between the Kenai Peninsula to the west and Evans Island to the east.

Bainbridge Island and nearby Bainbridge Passage, Bainbridge Point, and Bainbridge Glacier, were named by George Vancouver in 1794 in honor of the British astronomer John Bainbridge.
