= USCGC Mohawk (WMEC-913) =

US ship

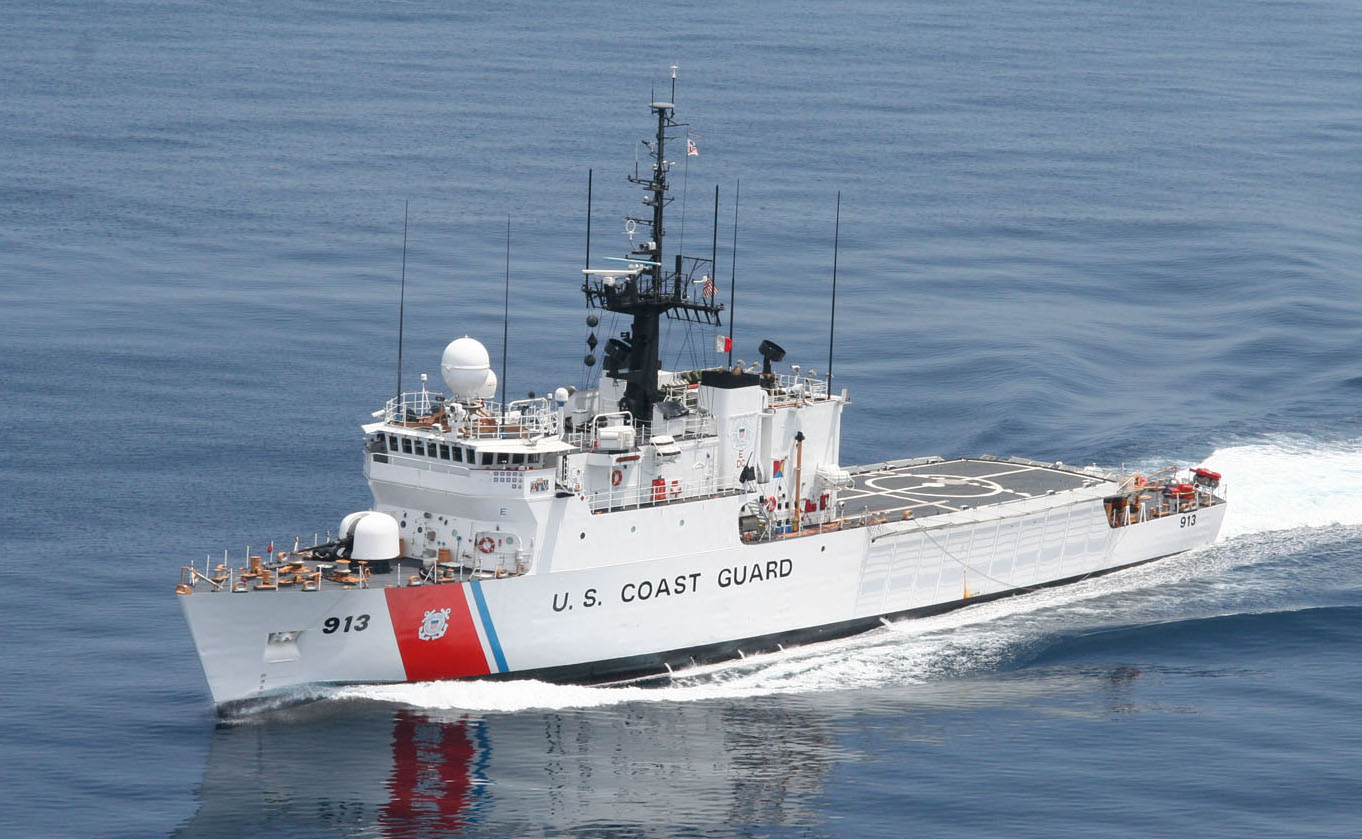
- USCGC Mohawk (WMEC-913)

History

United States
- Name: USCGC Mohawk
- Namesake: Mohawk nation
- Builder: Derecktor Shipyards, Middletown, Rhode Island
- Launched: September 9, 1989
- Commissioned: March 1991
- Home port: Key West, Florida
- Identification: MMSI number: 367260000; Callsign: NRUF
- Motto: Lifesaver – Enforcer – Defender
- Nickname(s): "Mighty Mo"
- Status: Active

General characteristics
- Class & type: Famous-class cutter
- Displacement: 1,800 long tons (1,829 t)
- Length: 270 ft (82 m)
- Beam: 38 ft (12 m)
- Draft: 14.5 ft (4.4 m)
- Propulsion: Twin turbo-charged ALCO V-18 diesel engines
- Range: 9,900 nautical miles (18,300 km; 11,400 mi)
- Endurance: 14-21 days
- Boats & landing craft carried: 1 × Over-the-Horizon (OTH) Interceptor; 1 × Cutter Boat Large (CB-L)
- Armament: 1 × OTO Melara Mark 75 76 mm/62 caliber naval gun; 2 × .50 caliber (12.7 mm) machine guns
- Aircraft carried: HH-65 Dolphin; HH-60 Jayhawk; MH-68 Stingray

USCGC Mohawk (WMEC-913) is a 270' United States Coast Guard Famous-class medium endurance cutter. She was launched on September 9, 1989 at Derecktor Shipyards of Middletown, Rhode Island and commissioned in March 1991. She is the third cutter named for the Mohawk nation, a tribe of Iroquoian Indians from the Mohawk Valley of New York.

== Service history ==
Mohawk is the thirteenth and last of the 270 foot Famous class cutters. Built by the former Robert E. Derecktor Shipyards of Rhode Island, Mohawk was christened on September 9, 1989. Since the time of her commissioning in March 1991, she served the Coast Guard in a wide variety of missions including Search and Rescue, Maritime Law Enforcement, and Alien Migrant Interdiction Operations.

Mohawk has been responsible for the rescue of more than 5,000 Haitian, Cuban, and Dominican Republic migrants and has supported as many as 756 migrants on deck at one time. Mohawk has also seized more than 20,700 pounds of illegal drugs. This, as well as Mohawk's role in several search and rescue cases and numerous boardings to enforce the United States national laws, has earned Mohawk two Unit Commendations, the Joint Meritorious Service Award and two Humanitarian Service Awards. Mohawk is homeported in Key West, Florida. On 13 January 2010, the Mohawk was ordered to assist in the humanitarian relief efforts following the 2010 Haiti earthquake.

In 2016, Mohawk completed a major MEP overhaul that was supposed to take three months but took almost two years in Baltimore, MD.

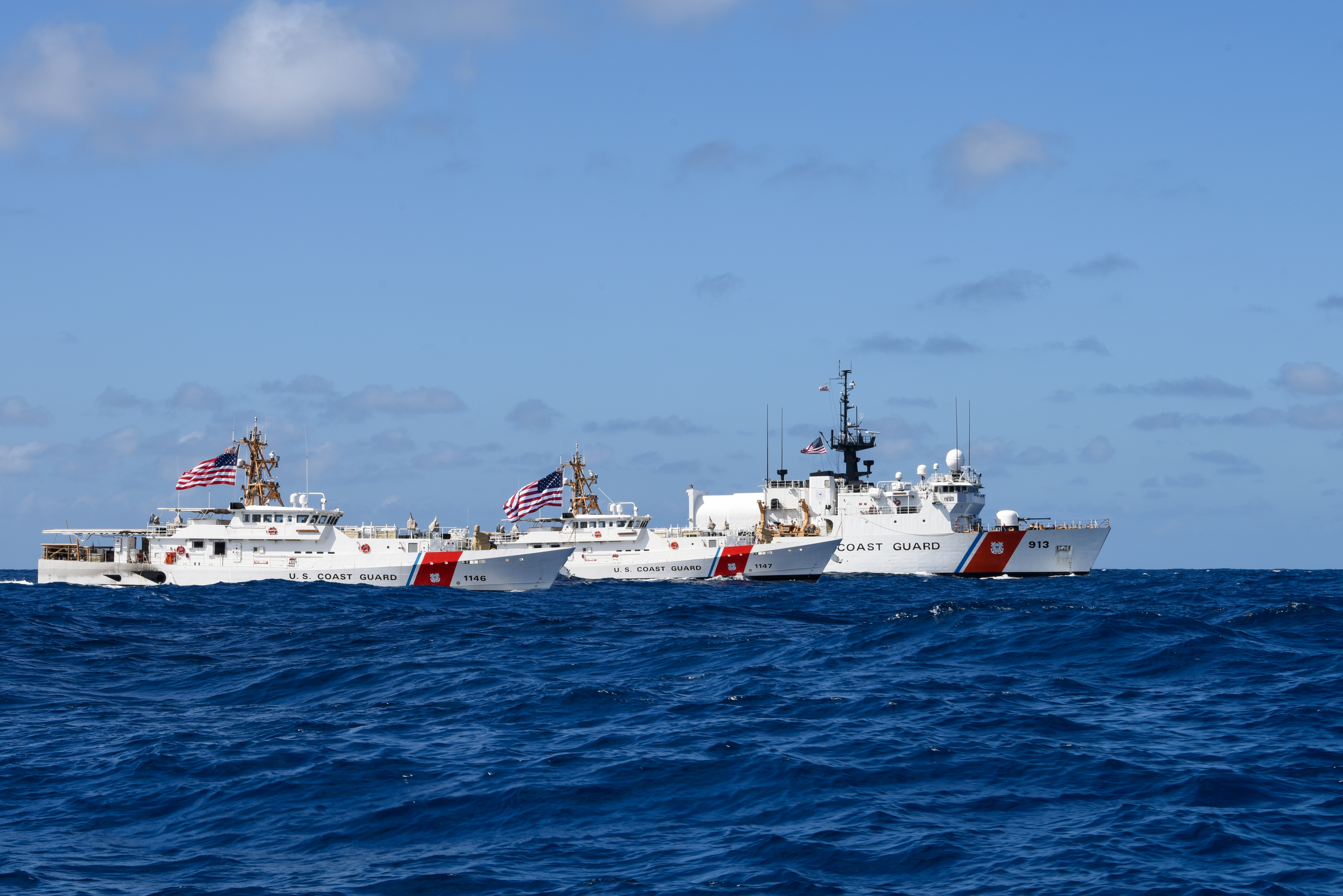
John Scheuerman, Clarence Sutphin Jr. and Mohawk during their Atlantic crossing

In June 2022, Mohawk escorted the fast response cutters USCGC John Scheuerman (WPC-1146) and USCGC Clarence Sutphin Jr. (WPC-1147) across the Atlantic Ocean on the way to their home port of Manama, Bahrain. She provided at-sea refueling services for the smaller, shorter-range vessels.

In April 2025, the wife of a Coast Guardsman of the Mohawk was arrested at the U.S. Naval Air Station at Key West, Florida, after she was flagged for having an expired work visa as part of a security check for access to base housing.

== Resources ==
- An HDTV documentary called A Day in the Life of the Mohawk- shows the Famous-class cutter patrolling the United States south coastal region in February and March 1999.
