= Latouche Island =

Island in Chugach Census Area, Alaska, United States

Coordinates: 60°00′13″N 147°56′15″W

Latouche Island is an island in the southern part of Alaska, United States. It lies in the Gulf of Alaska between Montague Island to the east and Evans Island to the northwest. Latouche Island has a land area of 60.627 km^{2} (23.408 sq mi) and had no resident population at the 2000 census.
