= Derecktor Shipyards =

American shipbuilding company

- Type: Private
- Industry: Transportation
- Founded: 1947
- Founder: Robert E. Derecktor
- Headquarters: Mamaroneck, New York, United States
- Number of locations: 3
- Area served: Worldwide
- Key people: Paul Derecktor
- Products: Yachts; Commercial vessels
- Services: Vessel repair Upgrades; Yacht and small boat repowering Full service boat marina facility
- Owner: Paul Derecktor
- Website: derecktor.com

Derecktor Shipyards is an American shipbuilding company located in Mamaroneck, New York, and founded in 1947 by Robert E. Derecktor. The company is known for building Cakewalk V, one of the largest yachts ever constructed in the United States. Derecktor operates three facilities: one in Mamaroneck, New York, focused on the construction and repair of custom yachts and small commercial vessels; another in Dania Beach, Florida, dedicated to the maintenance, repair, and refitting of mega-yachts up to 200 feet in length; and a third in Fort Pierce, Florida, equipped to maintain and refit sailing and motor yachts more than 200 feet in length.

== History ==
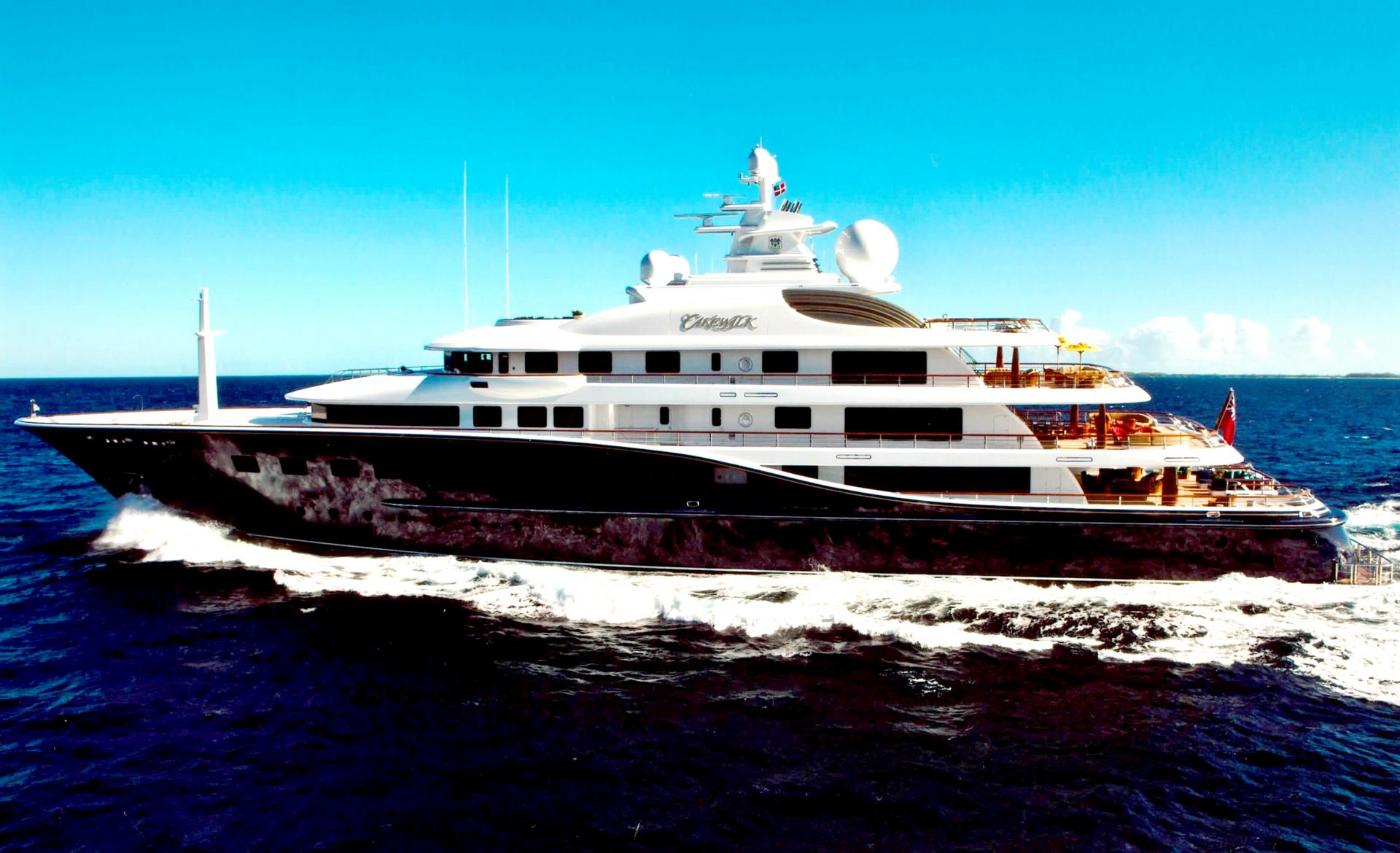
Cakewalk V in service

The company was founded in Mamaroneck, New York, in 1947 by Robert E. Derecktor. The company started as a yacht builder, although it has built many commercial vessels.

== Notable ships built ==
The following is the list of notable ships built by Derecktor Shipyards.

	Original Name	Original Owner	Type	Tons	Delivery	Description
1	USCGC Mohawk (WMEC-913)	United States Coast Guard	Medium endurance cutter	1,829 t	1989	Mohawk is the last of a series of nine 270’ Famous-class cutters built by Derecktor for the USCG
2	MV Fairweather	Alaska Marine Highway System	Det Norske Veritas catamaran ro-ro ferry	748	2004	All-aluminum aft and starboard ro-ro loading car ferry designed by Nigel Gee & Associates
3	MV Chenega	Alaska Marine Highway System	Ferry catamaran	748	2005	Aft and starboard ro-ro loading
4	Cakewalk	Charles Gallagher	Yacht	2,998	2010	Full displacement superyacht designed by Tim Heywood, naval architecture by Azure, interior design by Liz Dalton. At 281’ and 2998 GRT, it is the largest private yacht ever built in the USA when measured by volume.
5	Spirit of the Sound	Maritime Aquarium at Norwalk	Research vessel		2014	All-aluminum Incat designed catamaran classroom vessel with hybrid diesel-electric propulsion

=== Hybrid Series ===
Derecktor Shipyards has built three 65-ft aluminum catamarans powered by hybrid motors. The first was a research vessel for the Maritime Aquarium at Norwalk named Spirit of the Sound, completed in September 2014. The CUNY I, launched in May 2017, is used by Brooklyn College for research in the Jamaica Bay area. The Captain Ben Moore, launched in April 2019, transports cargo between Norwalk, Connecticut, and Huntington, New York.

== See also ==
- List of shipbuilders and shipyards in the United States
