= Princeton Glacier =

Glacier in the Kenai Peninsula, Alaska, US

Popo Glacier
- Location within Alaska
- Interactive map of Popo Glacier
- Type: Tidewater glacier
- Location: Valdez-Cordova Census Area, Alaska, United States
- Coordinates: 60°19′32″N 148°23′22″W
- Length: 10 m (33 ft)
- Terminus: Stream

The Princeton Glacier is a glacier in the Sargent Icefield, Kenai Peninsula in Alaska.

The glacier was named in 1909 for Princeton University by George Perkins of the United States Coast and Geodetic Survey.

The glacier's terminus is a little over a mile from Nassau Fjord and Prince William Sound.

== See also ==
- List of glaciers
