= Sargent Icefield =

Ice field in Alaska, United States

- Location within Alaska
- Interactive map of Sargent Icefield
- Type: Icefield
- Location: Kenai Peninsula Borough and Valdez-Cordova Census Area, Alaska, U.S.
- Coordinates: 60°17′48″N 148°35′09″W
- Terminus: outflow glaciers

The Sargent Icefield is a large icefield located on the eastern portion of the Kenai Peninsula bordering Prince William Sound in Alaska. The ice field has numerous outflow glaciers including the Chenega, Princeton, and Ellsworth Glaciers.

== See also ==
- List of glaciers and icefields
