= Fairweather Glacier =

Glacier in Alaska, United States

- Location within Alaska
- Interactive map of Fairweather Glacier
- Location: Alaska, U.S.
- Coordinates: 58°50′33″N 137°38′54″W
- Length: 19 mi (31 km)

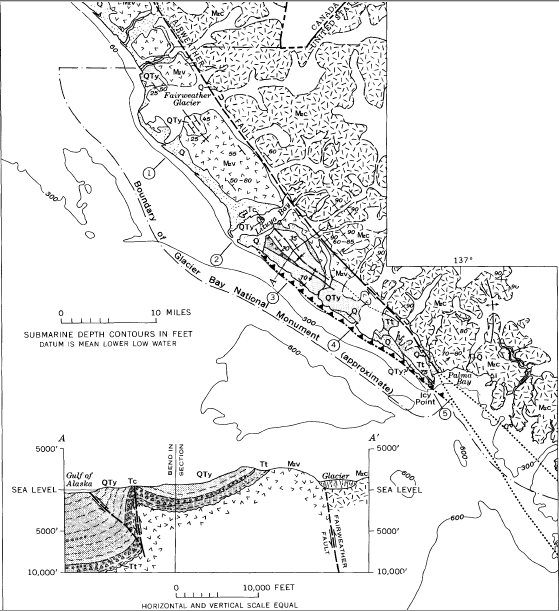
Geological map showing the Fairweather Glacier in the upper left

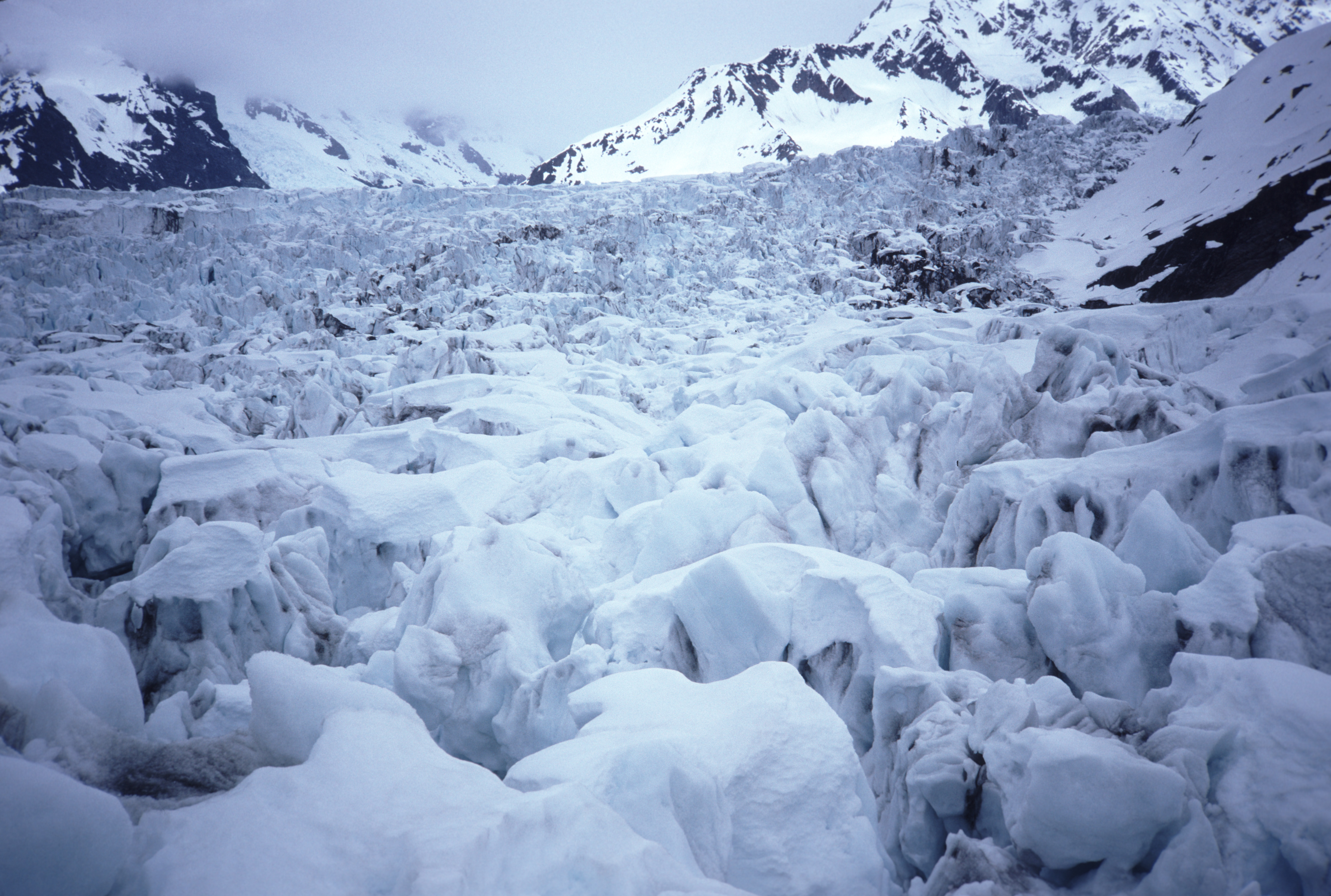
An icefall part way up the Fairweather Glacier, which must be crossed to climb the SE Ridge from the Sea.

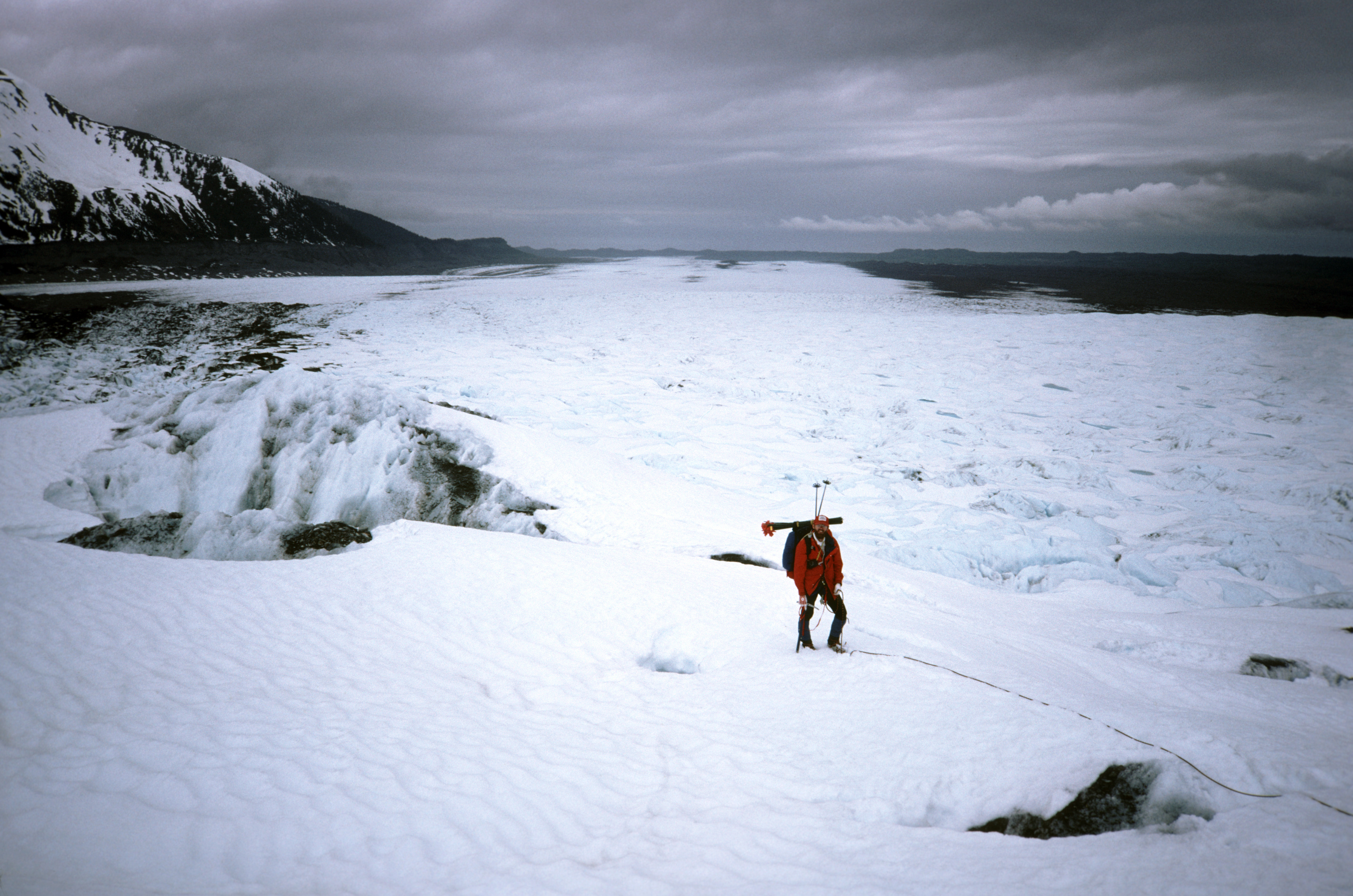
Looking down (W) the Fairweather Glacier

Fairweather Glacier is a 19 mi (31 km) long glacier in Glacier Bay National Park and Preserve in the U.S. state of Alaska. It begins on the west slope of Mount Salisbury and continues west to its 1961 terminus 0.2 miles (300 m) east of Cape Fairweather, 100 miles (161 km) northwest of Hoonah.

Fairweather Glacier is the eponym of the Alaska Marine Highway fast ferry MV Fairweather.

== See also ==
- List of glaciers
