= Som Menorca =

Former Alaska Marine Highway Ferry

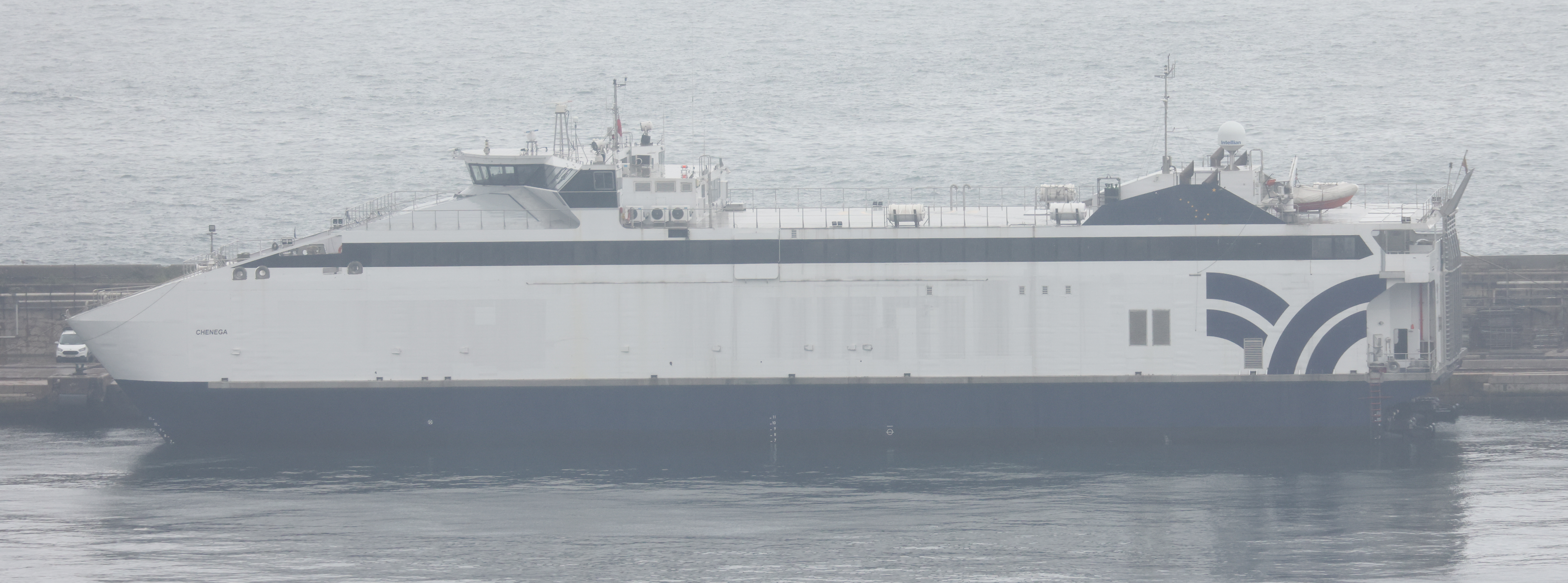
- Chenega in Gibraltar

History

United States
- Name: MV Chenega
- Namesake: Chenega Glacier
- Operator: Alaska Marine Highway System
- Route: Southeast Alaska; Prince William Sound
- Builder: Derecktor Shipyards, Bridgeport, Connecticut
- Cost: $36 million
- Launched: December 11, 2004
- Out of service: 2016
- Home port: Cordova, Alaska
- Identification: IMO number: 9265794; Callsign: WDC3997; Official Number: 1166054
- Fate: Sold March 10, 2021

Spain
- Owner: Servicios y Concesiones Maritimas Ibicencas
- Route: Spain - Ibiza
- Cost: $3,111,111
- Acquired: March 10, 2021
- Identification: IMO number: 9265794; MMSI number: 224686000; Callsign: EAIB

General characteristics
- Tonnage: 3,424 GT
- Length: 235 ft (72 m)
- Beam: 60 ft (18 m)
- Draft: 8.5 ft (2.6 m)
- Decks: One vehicle deck; One passenger deck
- Installed power: 4 x MTU 20V 4000 M73L engines
- Propulsion: Water jet
- Speed: 32 knots
- Capacity: 210 passengers; 31 vehicles

Som Menorca is a catamaran ferry built by Derecktor Shipyards in Bridgeport, Connecticut for the Alaska Marine Highway System. She was launched in 2004 and primarily served routes in Prince William Sound and Southeast Alaska. The ship proved uneconomical to operate on those routes, and she was laid up in 2016. In March 2021 she was sold to Servicios y Concesiones Maritimas Ibicencas for service between Mallorca and Menorca. In 2025 her Spanish owners reassigned her to a route crossing the Strait of Gibraltar.

== Construction and characteristics ==
Much of coastal Alaska is inaccessible by road, leaving many widely dispersed communities dependent on weather-affected flights and long ferry rides. Residents of Prince William Sound and Southeast Alaska urged political leaders to find better transportation alternatives. In January 2000 Governor Tony Knowles rejected building a road from Juneau to Skagway which would connect the state capital to the rest of the North American road network. Instead, he pushed for fast ferries between the towns of Southeast Alaska. At the same time, ferry planners considering service improvements to Seward and Prince William Sound communities began to focus on the same type of fast ferry. These plans led to the construction of Chenega and her sister ship, MV Fairweather.

Chenega was designed by BMT Nigel Gee & Associates of Southampton, England. She was built by Derecktor Shipyards in Bridgeport, Connecticut as part of a two-ship contract. The deal included an option to purchase two more sisterships. The contract was awarded in February 2002 and construction on Fairweather began in July 2002. Construction on Chenega began in January 2003. The ship was launched on December 11, 2004, and christened by Catherine Stevens, wife of Alaska Senator Ted Stevens. Shattered glass from the Champaign bottle broken across Chenega's bow cut Mrs. Stevens' finger and she left the party to get treatment for her wound. Builder's sea trials began in Long Island Sound in March 2005 and the ship left for Alaska later that month.

Chenega's original cost was $36 million, much of which was funded by the federal government. Her construction was certified by the Det Norske Vertias classification society.

Chenega is 235 feet (72 m) long, with a beam of 59 feet (18 m), and a loaded draft of 8.5 feet (2.6 m). She displaces 787 long tons. Her gross tonnage, calculated under international rules, is 3,420 tons, while her U.S. gross registered tonnage is 1,333. Her hull is constructed of an aluminum alloy. She has vehicle loading doors both on her transom and starboard side to allow for different port configurations.

She is powered by four MTU 20V 4000 M73L diesel engines which produce 4,830 bhp (3,600 kW) each. These drive four KaMeWa 90SII water jets with six-bladed impellers. This machinery is located in two separate engine rooms, half in each of the catamaran hulls. Her cruising speed is 32 knots, at which she burns 600 gallons of diesel fuel per hour. Her maximum speed is 43 knots. Chenega is equipped with an active interceptor roll control system to increase passenger comfort in rough seas and swells. She has two 100 hp bow thrusters, one in each hull, for maneuvering.

Electrical power on the ship is provided by four Northern Lights M6125T generators, each capable of producing 185 kW. As with her propulsion machinery, the generators are split between the two engine rooms.

She has two 6,900 gallon diesel fuel tanks and one 1000 gallon potable water tank.

Her normal crew complement is ten.

Chenega has a single vehicle deck with 620 feet (190 m) of lanes. She can therefore carry 31 standard vehicles or whatever combination of vehicles will fit. Above the vehicle deck she has seating for 210 passengers on a passenger deck. The passenger deck includes a snack bar, solarium, and child's play area. There are no passenger staterooms as the vessel is intended for day-use only.

All Alaska Marine Highway System ferries are named after glaciers. Chenega was named after the Chenega Glacier in Prince William Sound.

== Operating history ==
Chenega was originally slated for service in Prince William Sound, shuttling between Cordova, her homeport, Valdez, and Whittier. As the Portage Glacier Highway linked Whittier to Anchorage by road, bus, and train, the fast ferry was not only expected to reduce travel time among its three stops, but to increase tourism in the region from the larger city.

Chenega arrived at Auke Bay, Alaska on May 11, 2005. The State did not reach an agreement with its labor unions to run the vessel, however, until July. After the required training of the new crew, the ship ran its planned route for only two weeks before being reassigned, infuriating Prince William Sound residents.

During the winter of 2005-2006 Chenega ran from Ketchikan to Petersburg. During this experiment, Fairweather ran from Juneau to Petersburg. The ships met in Petersburg in order to exchange vehicles and passengers for those who wished to travel the entire length of Southeast Alaska. The purpose of this routing was to test demand and operational issues to determine if the State should exercise its option to purchase an additional two ships in order to establish this service permanently. Ridership was light and Governor Frank Murkowski called the fast ferries a "bad deal." Based on this experience, the option to buy additional fast ferries under the contract with Derecktor was not exercised.

In January 2006 Fairweather was drydocked for annual maintenance and it was found that the steel cylinder sleeves in her aluminum engine blocks had cracked, allowing coolant into the cylinders. Further, damage was detected in the reduction gears between the engines and water jets. Fairweather was under repair until early July 2006, when she returned to service with three new engines, four new reduction gears, and four new drive shafts. Chenega was assigned to replace Fairweather on her route in Southeast Alaska, but finally left for Prince William Sound in May 2006.

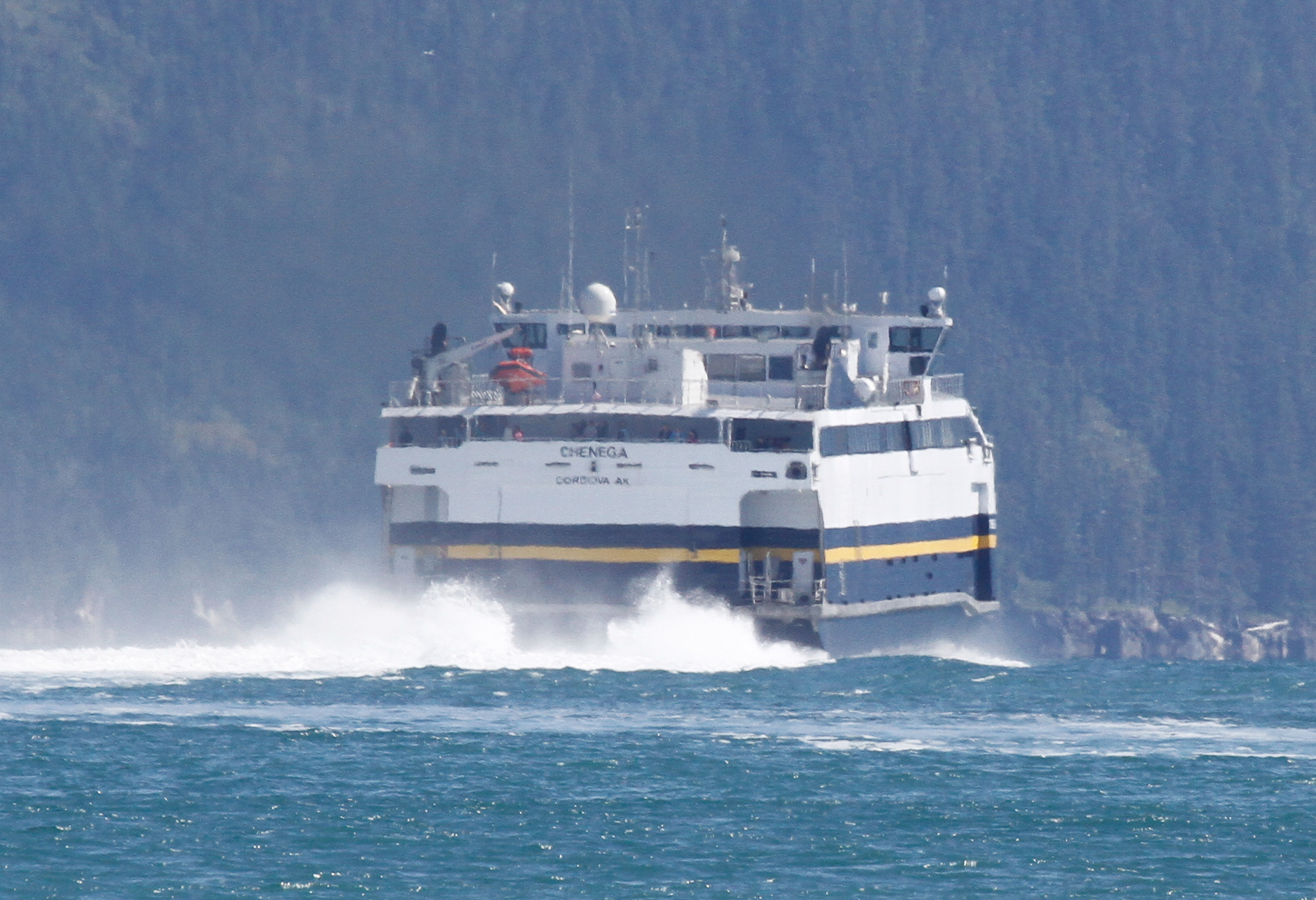
Chenega speeding across Prince William Sound in 2014

Chenega spent most of her summers sailing Prince William Sound. She was often reassigned to Southeast Alaska, particularly in the winter when tourist travel in Southcentral Alaska ebbed. As a general matter, she sailed less in the winter when early darkness made avoiding floating logs that would jam her water jets difficult, and when high winds and seas exceeded her capabilities.

The original engines installed in the fast ferries suffered a number of mechanical issues and were difficult to maintain. Only about 150 of these engines were ever manufactured and the only 8 in the state of Alaska were aboard Fairweather and Chenega. Spare parts were not available and had to be manufactured when needed. In 2010 the State sued Derecktor and MTU for unspecified damages related to the ongoing engine problems. In March 2013, a month before the suit was to go to trial, an agreement was reached between the State and MTU. The engine manufacturer agreed to replace the ship's engines and offered a number of maintenance-related options on the new engines. Pursuant to this agreement, in 2014 Chenega was repowered, replacing the four original MTU 16V595 TE70 engines with the current MTU 20V 4000 M73L engines.

== Retirement from Alaskan service ==
Chenega and the Alaska Marine Highway System in general were subsidized by the State of Alaska. State funding for the ferry system peaked in the 2012 fiscal year at $111.2 million and was gradually reduced to $56 million in 2020, in part forced by a reduction in state tax revenues from oil extraction. Passenger traffic on the ferry system fell from 350,000 in 1998 to 251,000 in 2018, as more travelers opted for air travel. Car and truck traffic on the ferries remained stable. These factors put Chenega at a disadvantage. Her high speed could not compete with airlines, but produced higher operating costs than traditional ferries. Her high speed came at the sacrifice of carrying heavy loads, leaving her with more limited capacity for cars and trucks than traditional ferries.

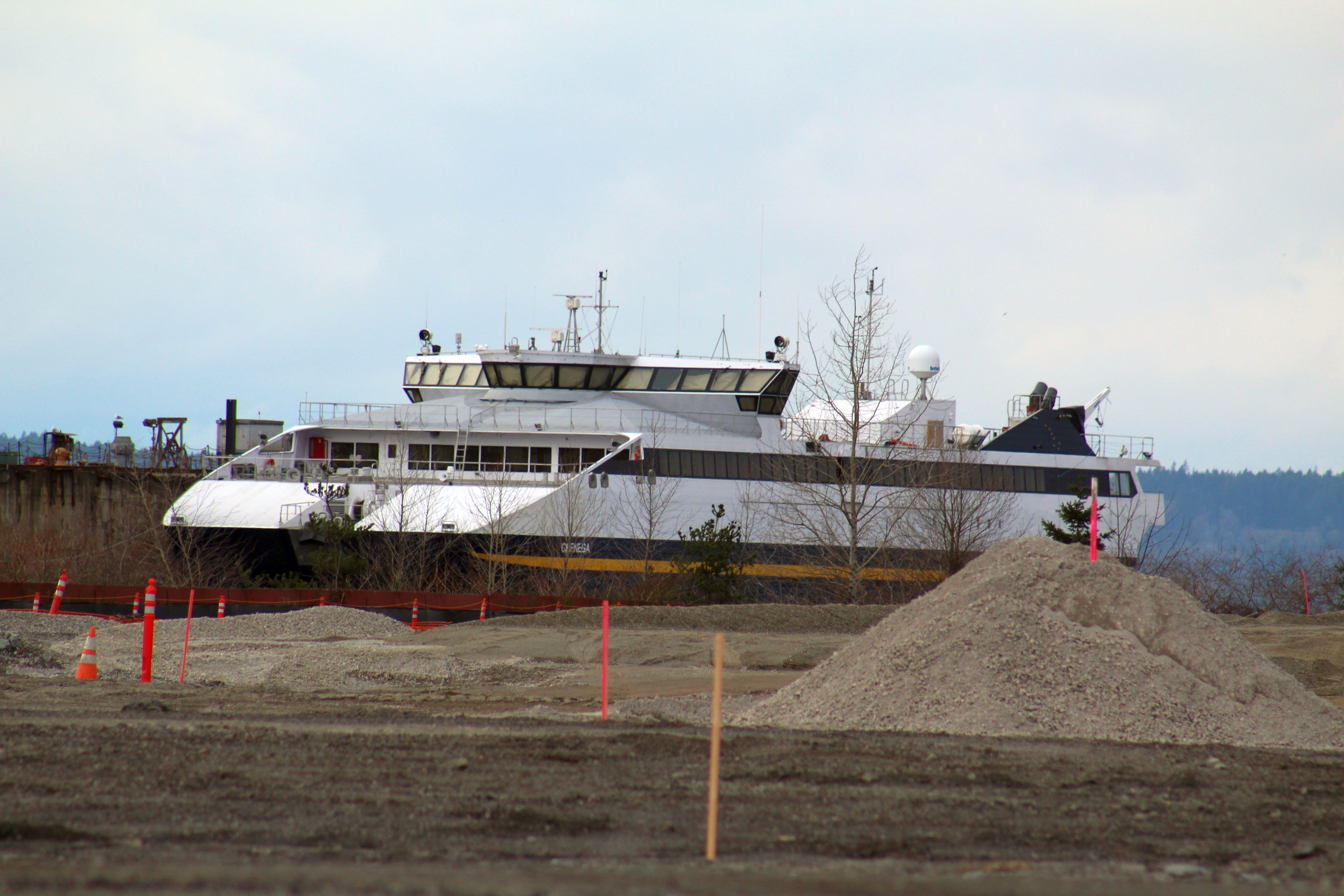
Chenega laid-up in Tacoma in 2017

While Chenega's speed was popular with travelers, her higher fuel consumption drove operating costs up significantly as fuel prices rose in the early 2000's. Budget considerations for the State of Alaska forced her retirement. The ship was laid up in the Vigor Marine shipyard in Tacoma, Washington in 2016. She returned to Alaska to be laid up in Ward Cove, north of Ketchikan. In October 2019 the State of Alaska issued a public notice seeking a broker to sell Chenega and Fairweather.

In March 2021 Chenega and Fairweather were sold by the Alaska Department of Transportation & Public Facilities to Servicios y Concesiones Maritimas Ibicencas for service in the Balearic Islands of Spain. Chenega was sold for $3,111,111. Her new owner, ferry operator Trasmapi, hired a heavy-lift ship, Red Zed 1, to carry the two ferries to Spain rather than having them sail there under their own power. The two ships were loaded aboard Red Zed 1 on June 25, 2021.

== Spanish service ==
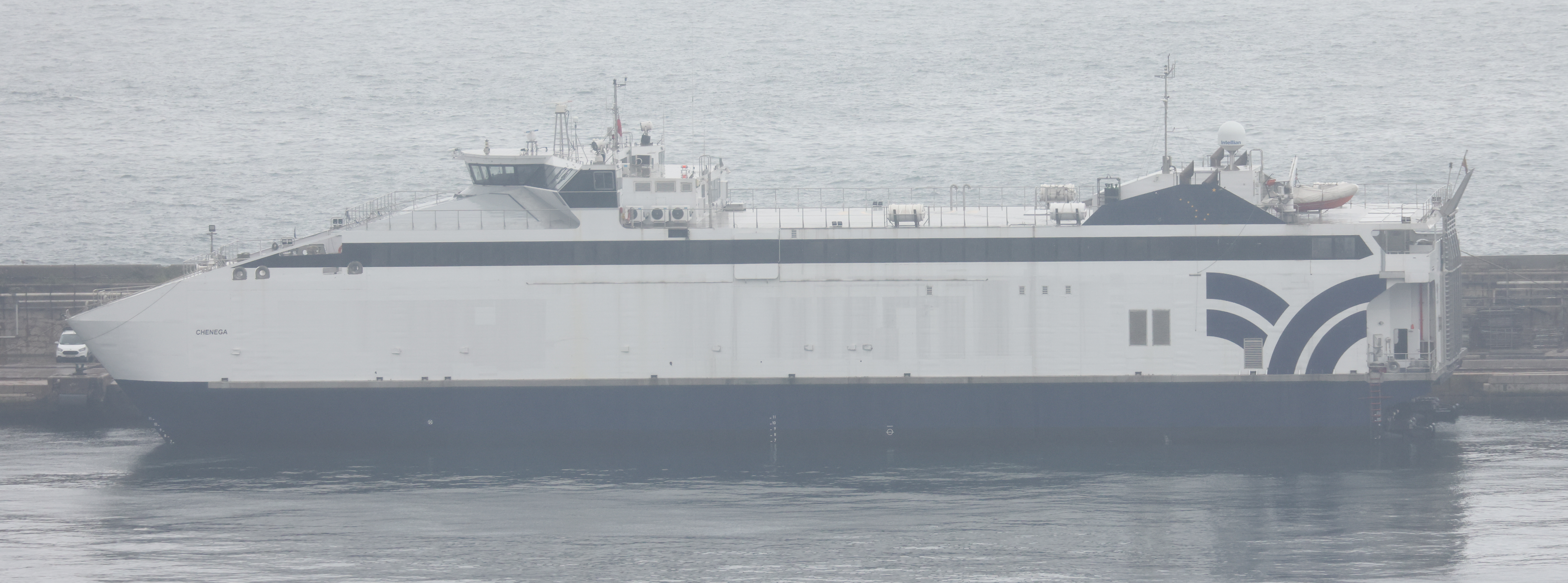
Chenega moored in Gibraltar in 2025

Chenega and Fairweather arrived at Ibiza by August 31, 2021. In the summer of 2022, Trasmapi began a new ferry service between Alcudia on Mallorca, and Ciutadella on Menorca using Chenega and Fairweather. The ship was repainted in the colors of her new owner, but retained the name Chenega and the gold-and-blue North Star symbol of Alaska on her funnel. This service was branded, "The Menorca Lines by Trasmapi". The trip took 75 minutes.

Trasmapi reassigned Chenega to a new route between Algeciras, Spain and Cueta in North Africa beginning in March 2025.

In 2026 it was renamed Som Menorca.
