= Fairweather (surname) =

Fairweather is a surname. Notable people with the surname include:

- Al Fairweather (1927–1993), British jazz musician
- Andy Fairweather Low (born 1948), Welsh guitarist, songwriter and vocalist
- Bruce Fairweather (born 1960), American guitarist and bassist
- Carlton Fairweather (1961–2025), English footballer
- Catherine Fairweather, British journalist, editor, and podcaster
- Denvor Fairweather (born 1975), Belizean television producer and executive
- Digby Fairweather (born 1946), British jazz cornettist and broadcaster
- Drew Fairweather (born 1979), American author
- Eugene Fairweather (1920–2002), Canadian theologian
- Fred Fairweather (1913–1983), Australian footballer (Australian rules football)
- G. Ernest Fairweather (1850–1920), Canadian architect
- Gaynor Fairweather, British ballroom dancer
- Gordon Fairweather (1923–2008), Canadian lawyer and politician
- Ian Fairweather (1891–1974), Australian painter
- Jack Fairweather (politician) (1878–1948), Canadian lawyer and politician
- Jack Fairweather (writer) (born 1978), British journalist and author
- Jackie Fairweather (born 1967), Australian triathlete and long-distance runner
- Kate Fairweather (born 1975), Australian archer
- Katriona Fairweather (born 1978), Scottish curler, World champion
- Ken Fairweather (1945–2022), Papua New Guinean politician
- Patrick Fairweather (born 1936), British retired diplomat
- Rivaldo Fairweather (born 2002), American football player
- Roxanne R. Fairweather, Canadian businesswoman
- Simon Fairweather (born 1969), Australia archer
- Steven Fairweather (born 1977), Canadian musician

Fictional characters:

- Angela Fairweather, character in the Power Rangers universe
- Gerry Fairweather, character in the BBC soap opera EastEnders
