= Tatitlek, Alaska =

Tatitlek, Alaska Taatiilaaq
- CDP
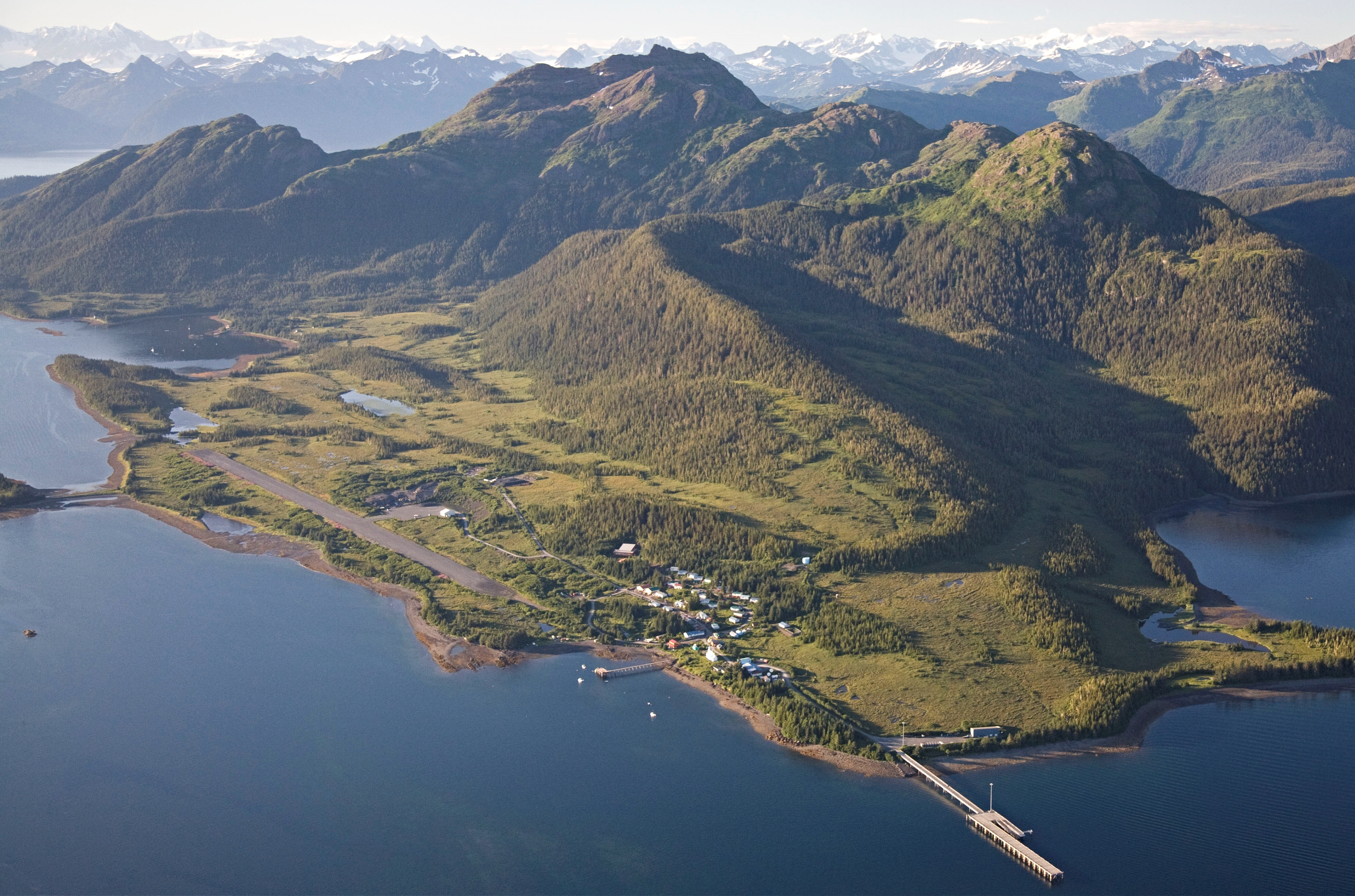
- Tatitlek at the base of Ellamar Mountain

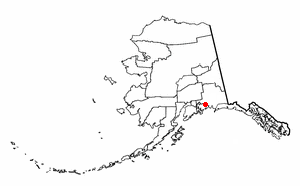
- Location of Tatitlek, Alaska
- Coordinates: 60°52′1″N 146°40′38″W
- Country: United States
- State: Alaska
- Census Area: Chugach

Government
  - State senator: Gary Stevens (R)
  - State rep.: Louise Stutes (R)

Area
  - Total: 10.06 sq mi (26.06 km^{2})
  - Land: 7.25 sq mi (18.78 km^{2})
  - Water: 2.81 sq mi (7.28 km^{2})

Population (2020)
  - Total: 90
  - Density: 12.4/sq mi (4.79/km^{2})
- Time zone: UTC-9 (Alaska (AKST))
  - Summer (DST): UTC-8 (AKDT)
- ZIP code: 99677
- Area code: 907
- FIPS code: 02-75380

Tatitlek /təˈtɪtlɪk/ (Alutiiq: Taatiilaaq; Russian: Татитлек) is a census-designated place (CDP) in Chugach Census Area, United States. As of the 2020 census, Tatitlek had a population of 90. Tatitlek is in the Chugach School District and has one school, Tatitlek Community School, serving about 15 students from preschool through high school. Tatitlek is served by the Tatitlek Airport.

== Geography ==
Tatitlek is located at 60°52′1″N 146°40′38″W (60.867083, -146.677209).

According to the United States Census Bureau, the CDP has a total area of 7.3 square miles (19 km^{2}), all of it land.

Tatitlek is located in the Prince William Sound of Alaska and is most famously known as the nearest village to the 1989 Exxon Valdez spill that decimated the area’s fishing resources.

== Demographics ==
Historical population
Census	Pop.	Note	%±
1880	73		—
1890	90		23.3%
1900	149		65.6%
1910	156		4.7%
1920	187		19.9%
1930	70		−62.6%
1940	75		7.1%
1950	89		18.7%
1960	96		7.9%
1970	111		15.6%
1980	68		−38.7%
1990	119		75.0%
2000	107		−10.1%
2010	88		−17.8%
2020	90		2.3%
U.S. Decennial Census

Tatitlek first appeared on the 1880 U.S. Census as the unincorporated village of "Tatikhlek." All 73 of its residents were listed as Inuit, despite being Chugach Alutiiq, who would have been listed as “Tinneh” in the census. In 1890, it returned as "Tatitlak." This also included an unnamed Creole (mixed Russian and Native) village on Cordova (now Orca) Bay. Of the 90 residents, 53 were Native, 36 were Creole and 1 White. In 1900, it returned as "Tatiklek." In 1910 and in every successive census, it has returned as its present spelling of Tatitlek. It was made a census-designated place (CDP) in 1980. Within its boundaries is the former mining village of Ellamar (which reported on the 1910-20 & 1940-50 censuses. 1910: 98; 1920: 106; 1940: 23; 1950: 46).

As of the census of 2000, there were 107 people, 38 households, and 28 families residing in the CDP. The population density was 14.7 inhabitants per square mile (5.7/km^{2}). There were 57 housing units at an average density of 7.8 per square mile (3.0/km^{2}). The racial makeup of the CDP was 14.02% White, 84.11% Native American, 0.93% Asian, and 0.93% from two or more races.

Of the 38 households, 44.7% had children under the age of 18 living with them, 47.4% were married couples living together, 21.1% had a female householder with no husband present, and 23.7% were non-families. 21.1% of all households were made up of individuals, and 2.6% had someone living alone who was 65 years of age or older. The average household size was 2.82 and the average family size was 3.28.

In the CDP, the age distribution of the population shows 36.4% under the age of 18, 7.5% from 18 to 24, 24.3% from 25 to 44, 24.3% from 45 to 64, and 7.5% who were 65 years of age or older. The median age was 30 years. For every 100 females, there were 94.5 males. For every 100 females age 18 and over, there were 106.1 males.

The median income for a household in the CDP was $36,875, and the median income for a family was $36,667. Males had a median income of $26,250 versus $8,750 for females. The per capita income for the CDP was $13,015. There were 17.9% of families and 24.2% of the population living below the poverty line, including 18.2% of under eighteens and none of those over 64.
