= Speedlink Jet =

Former Alaska Marine Highway Ferry

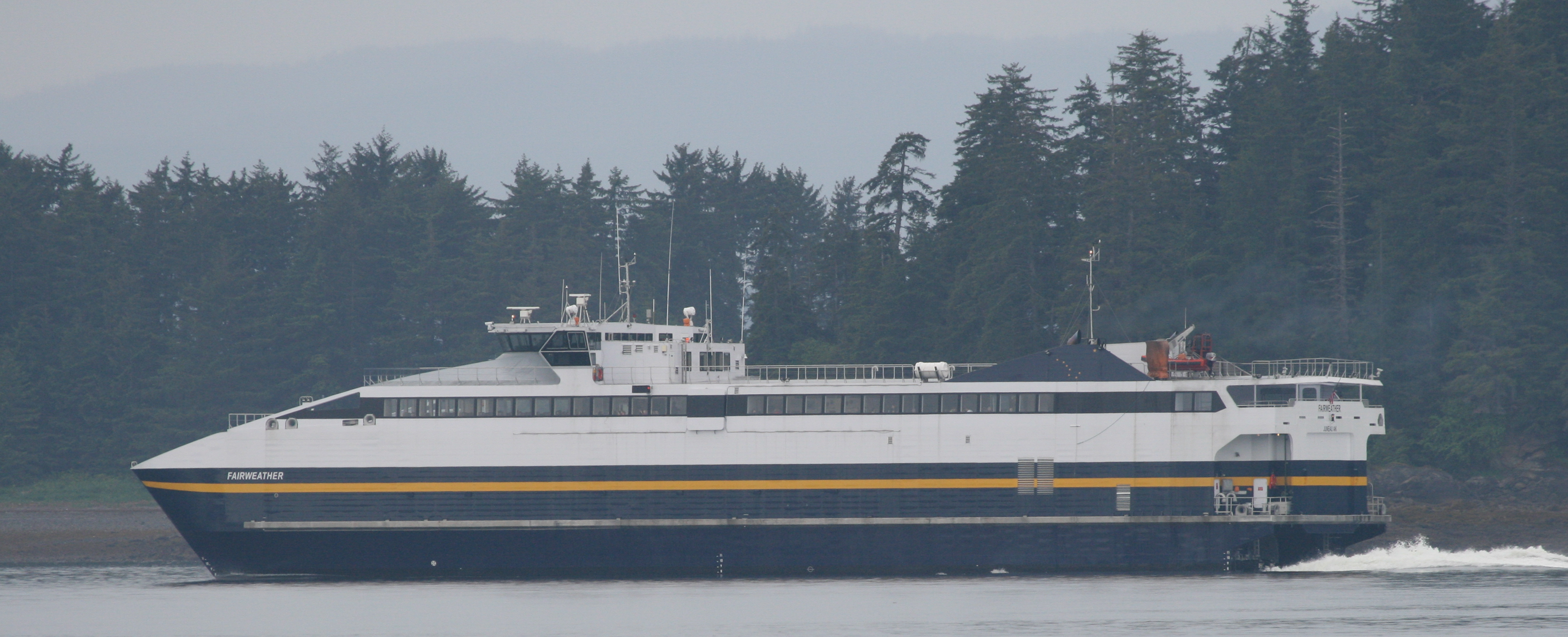
- MV Fairweather

History

United States
- Name: MV Fairweather
- Namesake: Fairweather Glacier
- Operator: Alaska Marine Highway System
- Route: Southeast Alaska; Prince William Sound
- Builder: Derecktor Shipyards, Bridgeport, Connecticut
- Cost: $36 million
- Launched: November 15, 2003
- Maiden voyage: June 7, 2004
- Out of service: 2019
- Home port: Juneau, Alaska
- Identification: IMO number: 9265809; MMSI number: 338116000; Callsign: WDB5604; Official Number: 1148175
- Fate: Sold March 10, 2021

Spain
- Owner: Servicios y Concesiones Maritimas Ibicencas
- Route: Spain - Ibiza
- Cost: $2,063,333
- Acquired: March 10, 2021

General characteristics
- Tonnage: 3,424 GT
- Length: 235 ft (72 m)
- Beam: 60 ft (18 m)
- Draft: 8.5 ft (2.6 m)
- Decks: One vehicle deck; One passenger deck
- Installed power: 4 x MTU 20V 4000 M73L engines
- Propulsion: Water jet
- Speed: 32 knots
- Capacity: 210 passengers; 31 vehicles

Speedlink Jet is a catamaran ferry built by Derecktor Shipyards in Bridgeport, Connecticut for the Alaska Marine Highway System entering service 2004. After being laid up since 2019, in March 2021 it was sold to Servicios y Concesiones Maritimas Ibicencas for service between Mallorca and Menorca.

== Construction and characteristics ==
Much of coastal Alaska is inaccessible by road, leaving many widely dispersed communities dependent on weather-affected flights and long ferry rides. Residents of Southeast Alaska urged political leaders to find better transportation alternatives. In January 2000 Governor Tony Knowles rejected building a road from Juneau to Skagway which would connect the state capital to the rest of the North American road network. Instead, he pushed for fast ferries between the towns of Southeast Alaska. Fairweather was the result of this initiative.

Fairweather was designed by BMT Nigel Gee & Associates of Southampton, England. She was built by Derecktor Shipyards in Bridgeport, Connecticut as part of a two-ship contract that included sister-ship MV Chenega. The contract was awarded in February 2002 and construction began in July 2002. The ship was launched on November 15, 2003, and christened by Nancy Murkowski, then the First Lady of Alaska. Fairweather's original cost was $36 million, much of which was funded by the federal government. Her construction was certified by the Det Norske Vertias classification society.

Fairweather is 235 feet (72 m) long, with a beam of 60 feet (18 m), and a loaded draft of 8.5 feet (2.6 m). She displaces 787 long tons. Her gross tonnage, calculated under international rules, is 3,424 tons, while her U.S. gross registered tonnage is 1,280. Her hull is constructed of an aluminum alloy. She has vehicle loading doors both on her transom and starboard sides to allow for different port configurations.

She is powered by four MTU 20V 4000 M73L diesel engines which produce 4,830 bhp (3,600 kW) each. These drive four KaMeWa 90SII water jets with six-bladed impellers. This machinery is located in two separate engine rooms, half in each of the catamaran hulls. Her cruising speed is 32 knots, at which she burns 600 gallons of diesel fuel per hour. Her maximum speed is 43 knots. Fairweather is equipped with an active interceptor roll control system to increase passenger comfort in rough seas and swells. She has two 100 hp bow thrusters, one in each hull, for maneuvering.

Electrical power on the ship is provided by four Northern Lights M6125T generators, each capable of producing 185 kW. As with her propulsion machinery, the generators are split between the two engine rooms.

She has two 6,900 gallon diesel fuel tanks and one 1000 gallon potable water tank.

Her normal crew complement is ten.

Fairweather has a single vehicle deck with 620 feet (190 m) of lanes. She can therefore carry 31 standard vehicles or whatever combination of vehicles will fit. Above the vehicle deck she has seating for 210 passengers on a passenger deck. The passenger deck includes a snack bar, solarium, and child's play area. There are no passenger staterooms as the vessel is intended for day-use only.

All Alaska Marine Highway System ferries are named after glaciers. Fairweather was named after the Fairweather Glacier in Glacier Bay National Park.

== Operating history ==
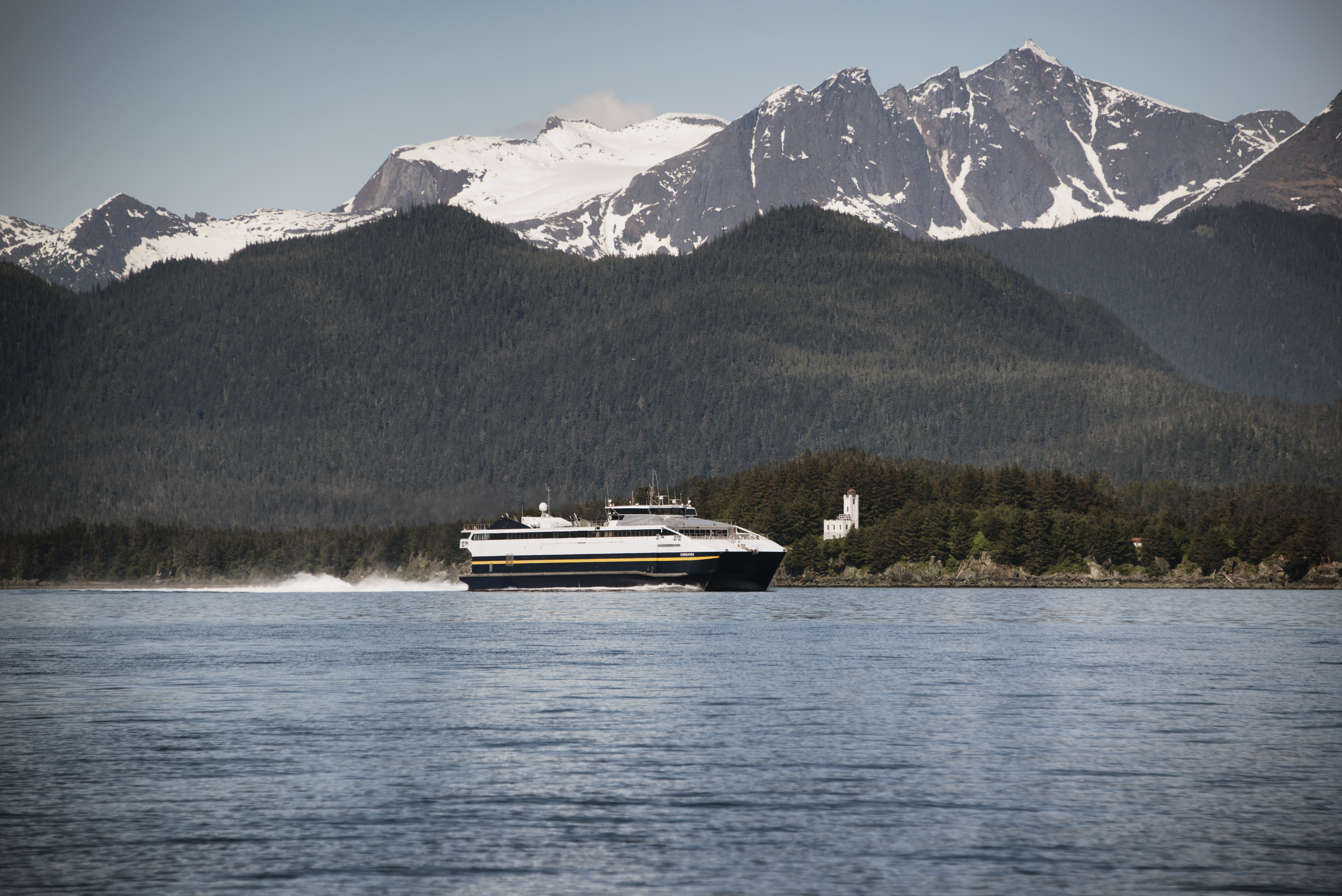
MV Fairweather passing Sentinel Island Light in Favorite Channel

Fairweather left Bridgeport on March 3, 2004. She sailed through the Panama Canal and stopped for fuel in San Diego and Seattle, among other ports. Her builder, Derecktor, delivered the vessel to Alaska where ownership was transferred to the state. She remained under warranty for 18 months.

Fairweather was originally planned for a Sitka-Juneau high speed ferry link, with the ship homeported in Sitka. However, the state changed its plans and decided to homeport the ferry in Juneau, creating an uproar in Sitka. A complement of about 24 jobs with a $1 million payroll went to whichever community was her homeport. Fairweather's route was changed to a compromise between the communities that desired the improved service. She served the Lynn Canal route (Juneau to Haines and Skagway) four days a week and Sitka-Juneau route three days a week. She began her first commercial run at 7 am on June 7, 2004. Fairweather sailed from Juneau to Haines on her maiden voyage.

The ship had a number of early technical issues. On her trip from Bridgeport to Alaska, she stopped in Acapulco for repairs to a faulty engine computer. In September 2004 one of her engines failed because improperly installed parts caused water to leak into the exhaust system. Still under warranty, the engine was replaced by November 2004. The large, open ducts that fed seawater into the jet pumps sucked in tree-sized logs which jammed their operation. In January 2006 the ship was drydocked for annual maintenance and it was found that the steel cylinder sleeves in her aluminum engine blocks had cracked, allowing coolant into the cylinders. Further, damage was detected in the reduction gears between the engines and water jets. Fairweather was under repair until early July 2006, when she returned to service with three new engines, four new reduction gears, and four new drive shafts.

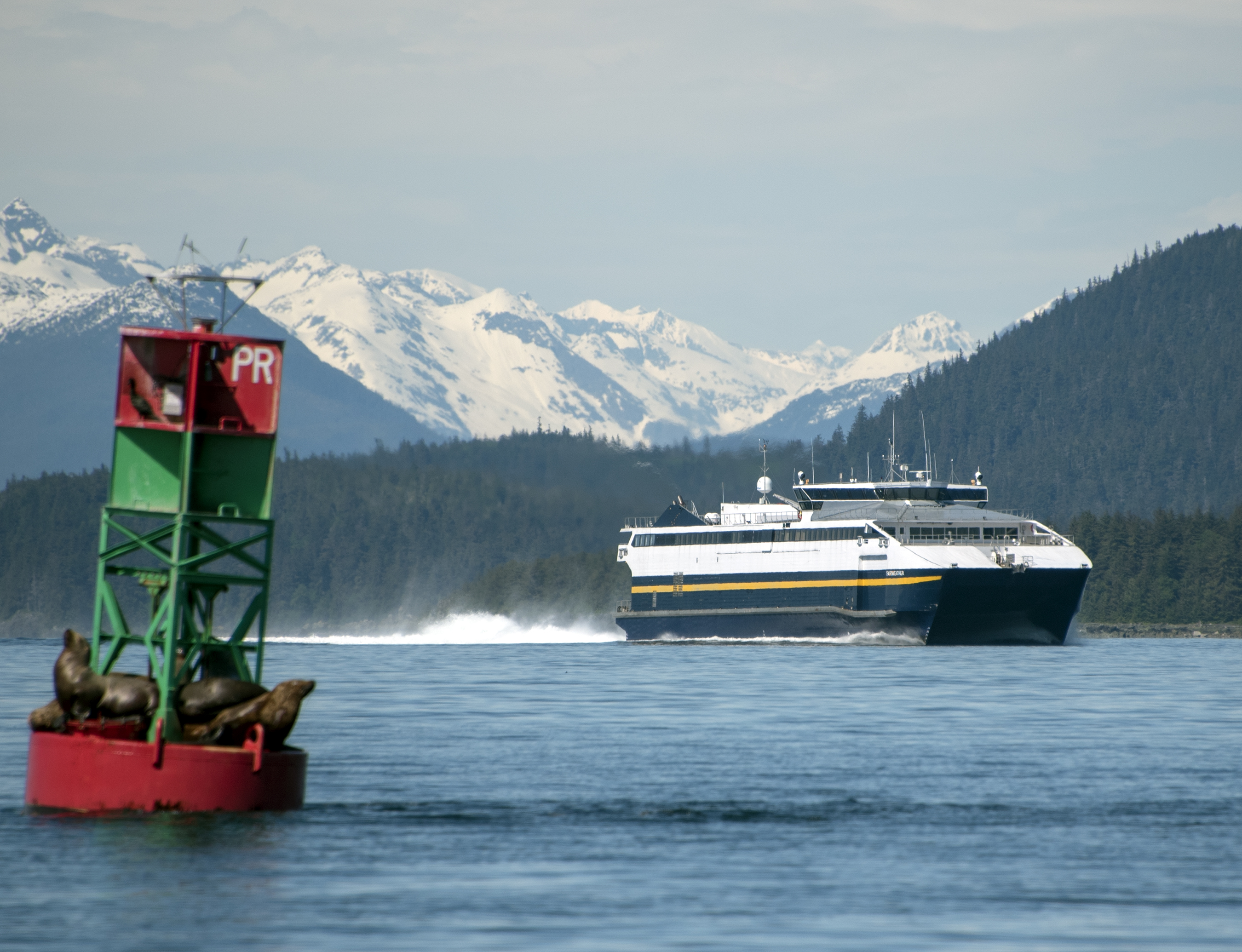
MV Fairweather near Poundstone Rock nearing Auke Bay ferry terminal

There were also significant labor difficulties early in her career. Fairweather's speed markedly changed her staffing needs from those of traditional ferries. The slower, traditional ships in the Alaska Marine Highway System had multiple crews covering multiple shifts, while Fairweather could complete her run and return home on the same day using a single shift. Bargaining with the Inlandboatman's Union, the Marine Engineers' Beneficial Association, and the International Organization of Masters, Mates & Pilots broke down and Fairweather was idled in January 2005. An agreement between the state and the unions was finally reached in March 2005 and the ferry resumed service.

Fairweather's routing changed over the years to provide more or less service to various Southeast Alaska ports. As a general matter, she sailed less in the winter when early darkness made avoiding floating logs that would jam the water jets difficult, and when travel in Southeast Alaska reached a low point. One thing that did not change was trouble with her engines. On October 1, 2008 she began an engine overhaul project that was funded with $5 million of federal capital improvement funds. The project was substantially delayed for lack of replacement parts. Only about 150 of these engines were ever manufactured and the only 8 in the state of Alaska were aboard Fairweather and Chenega. By the time the needed parts were ordered and could be delivered, Fairweather's return to service was delayed until July 2009. In 2010 the state sued Derecktor and MTU for unspecified damages related to the ongoing engine problems. In March 2013, a month before the suit was to go to trial, an agreement was reached between the state and MTU. The engine manufacturer agreed to replace the ship's engines and offered a number of maintenance-related options on the new engines. Pursuant to this agreement, in 2014 Fairweather was repowered, replacing the four original MTU 16V595 engines with the current MTU 20V 4000 M73L engines.

During the winter of 2018-2019 Fairweather operated in Prince William Sound between Cordova, Valdez, and Whittier. In April 2019, the ship sailed to Ward Cove, near Ketchikan, and was idled.

== Retirement from Alaskan service ==
Fairweather and the Alaska Marine Highway System in general have always been subsidized by the State of Alaska. In 2009, one official commented that ticket sales on Fairweather did not even cover her fuel costs. State funding for the ferry system peaked in the 2012 fiscal year at $111.2 million and was gradually reduced to $56 million in 2020, in part forced by a reduction in state tax revenues from oil extraction. Passenger traffic on the ferry system fell from 350,000 in 1998 to 251,000 in 2018, as more travelers opted for air travel. Car and truck traffic on the ferries remained stable. All of these factors put Fairweather at a disadvantage. Her high speed could not compete with airlines, and produced higher operating costs than traditional ferries. Her high speed came at the sacrifice of carrying heavy loads, leaving her with more limited capacity for cars and trucks than traditional ferries.

In late 2006, the Alaska Marine Highway System began a study for a new Lynn Canal ferry. This ultimately resulted in the construction of two Alaska-class ferries, MV Tazlina and MV Hubbard. In 2019 the Alaska Marine Highway System replaced Fairweather with MV Tazlina on the Juneau-Skagway-Haines route. While Tazlina requires twice as long to complete the round-trip as Fairweather, she can carry 53 cars instead of 31, and the state expects to save $400,000 per year in fuel costs. In October 2019 the State of Alaska issued a public notice seeking a broker to sell Fairweather.

In March 2021 she was sold by the Alaska Department of Transportation & Public Facilities to Servicios y Concesiones Maritimas Ibicencas along with sister ship MV Chenega for service in the Balearic Islands of Spain. Fairweather was sold for $2,063,333. Her new owner, ferry service Trasmapi, hired a heavy-lift ship, Red Zed 1, to carry the two ferries to Spain rather than having them sail there under their own power. The two ships were loaded aboard Red Zed 1 on June 25, 2021.

== Spanish service ==
In the summer of 2022, Trasmapi began a new ferry service between Alcudia on Mallorca, and Ciutadella on Menorca using Fairweather. The ship was repainted in the colors of her new owner, but is still named Fairweather. This service is branded, "The Menorca Lines by Trasmapi". The trip takes 75 minutes.
