= Chenega, Alaska =

Chenega, Alaska Caniqaq
- CDP
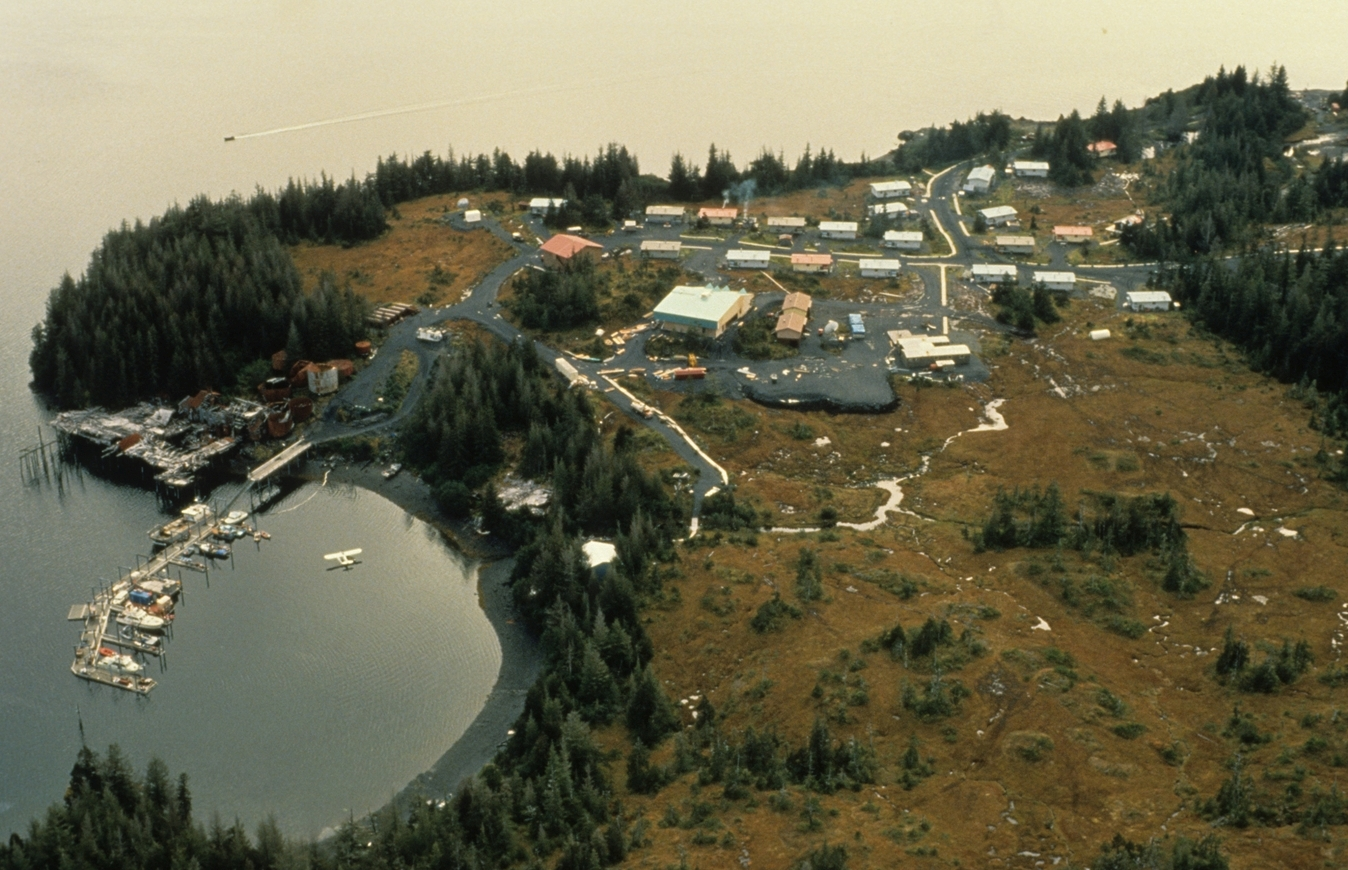
- Aerial of Chenega Bay village in 1989

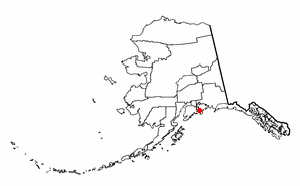
- Location of Chenega, Alaska
- Coordinates: 60°3′59″N 148°0′40″W
- Country: United States
- State: Alaska
- Census Area: Chugach

Government
  - State senator: Gary Stevens (R)
  - State rep.: Louise Stutes (R)

Area
  - Total: 29.56 sq mi (76.57 km^{2})
  - Land: 29.29 sq mi (75.85 km^{2})
  - Water: 0.28 sq mi (0.72 km^{2})

Population (2020)
  - Total: 59
  - Density: 2.0/sq mi (0.78/km^{2})
- Time zone: UTC-9 (Alaska (AKST))
  - Summer (DST): UTC-8 (AKDT)
- Area code: 907
- FIPS code: 02-12970

Chenega (/tʃɪˈniːɡə/; Alutiiq: Caniqaq) is a census-designated place (CDP) on Evans Island in the Chugach Census Area in the U.S. state of Alaska. Located in Prince William Sound, the CDP consists of the Chugach Alutiiq village of Chenega Bay, which was established only after the Good Friday earthquake destroyed the original community on Chenega Island to the north. As of the 2020 census, the population of the CDP was 59, largely Alaska Natives; as of 2021, the population of Chenega is estimated at 49. Chenega Bay is in the Chugach School District and has one school, Chenega Bay Community School, serving approximately 16 students from preschool through high school.

== History ==
=== Original Chenega ===
The original village of Chenega, located on Chenega Island, was inhabited by the Chenega tribe, a subgroup of the Chugach Alutiiq. The name Chenega derives from "Beneath the Mountain". The village was a fishing village that was settled before Russian arrival in the area. A post office operated there from 1946 until the destruction of the town in 1964.

=== Destruction of Chenega ===
The original village of Chenega was destroyed in 1964 by a tsunami from the Good Friday earthquake, which killed 26 residents, a third of the 68 people who lived there at the time, and leveled all the buildings in the town except for the school and a single house. Immediately following the tsunami, survivors were taken to Cordova, and the Bureau of Indian Affairs later permanently resettled them at Tatitlek.

=== Construction of Chenega Bay ===
After the Alaska Native Claims Settlement Act was passed, former residents of Chenega formed the Chenega Corporation, which acquired the right to select 76,093 acres of land near the site of the old Chenega Village Township. In 1977, following research into the landscape and the needs of villagers, a new town location was chosen at Crab Bay on Evans Island. Following the acquisition of funding for infrastructure, the new village, named Chenega Bay, was first occupied in 1984.

Former and current Chenega residents gathered each Good Friday to remember the dead of Chenega. On the 25th Good Friday after the earthquake, in 1989, the oil tanker Exxon Valdez ran aground in Prince William Sound, causing an oil spill that again devastated Chenega and other places around the area economically.

== Geography ==
Chenega is located at 60°3′59″N 148°0′40″W (60.066327, -148.010991). According to the United States Census Bureau, the CDP has a total area of 29.1 square miles (75 km^{2}), of which, 28.8 square miles (75 km^{2}) of it is land and 0.3 square miles (0.78 km^{2}) of it (1.17%) is water. The village location is isolated, only accessible by boat or by plane.

== Demographics ==
Historical population
Census	Pop.	Note	%±
1880	80		—
1890	73		−8.7%
1900	140		91.8%
1930	90		—
1940	95		5.6%
1950	91		−4.2%
1960	61		−33.0%
2020	59		—
U.S. Decennial Census

=== Old Chenega (1880–1964) ===
The original Chenega, then located on the south end of Chenega Island at 60°16′47″N 148°04′36″W, first appeared on the 1880 U.S. Census as an unincorporated Sugpiaq village (all 80 residents were Sugpiaq/Alutiiq). It reported on the 1890 census as "Ingamatsha." 71 of the residents were Native Alaskans and 2 were "Creole" (mixed Russian/Caucasian and Native Alaskan).

It returned in 1900 as Chenega. It did not appear on the 1910 & 1920 censuses. It appeared as "Chanega" in 1930 & 1940 and lastly as Chenega in 1950 and 1960. It was largely destroyed in the Good Friday Earthquake of 1964 and its residents relocated. The old village has not been reported on the census since. Some buildings remain as of 2019.

=== New Chenega (Chenega Bay) (1990–) ===
Historical population
Census	Pop.	Note	%±
1990	94		—
2000	86		−8.5%
2010	76		−11.6%
2020	59		−22.4%
U.S. Decennial Census

The new Chenega (or Chenega Bay) first appeared on the 1990 U.S. Census as a census-designated place (CDP). It was founded in 1982 by former residents from the Old Chenega and is located on the east side of Evans Island, named for the old village and island.

As of the census of 2000, there were 86 people, 22 households, and 17 families residing in the CDP. The population density was 3.0 inhabitants per square mile (1.2/km^{2}). There were 27 housing units at an average density of 0.9 per square mile (0.35/km^{2}). The racial makeup of the CDP was 22.09% White, 73.26% Native American, and 4.65% from two or more races.

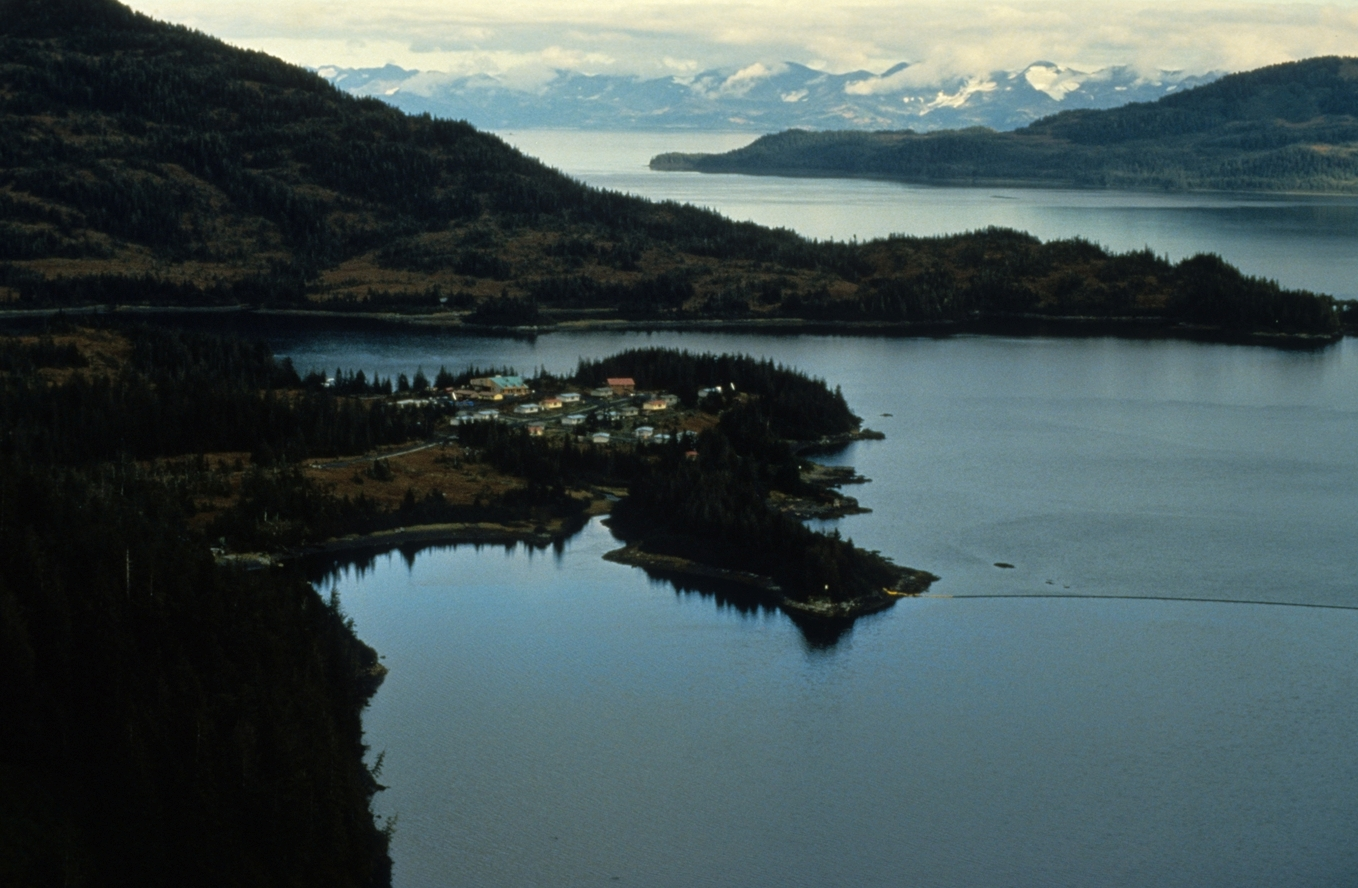
Distant aerial view of Chenega, Alaska, 1989

Of the 22 households, 40.9% had children under the age of 18 living with them, 63.6% were married couples living together, 9.1% had a female householder with no husband present, and 18.2% were non-families. 13.6% of all households were made up of individuals, and none had someone living alone who was 65 years of age or older. The average household size was 3.55 and the average family size was 3.83.

In the CDP, the population was spread out, with 33.7% under the age of 18, 7.0% from 18 to 24, 32.6% from 25 to 44, 20.9% from 45 to 64, and 5.8% who were 65 years of age or older. The median age was 30 years. For every 100 females, there were 132.4 males. For every 100 females age 18 and over, there were 119.2 males.

The median income for a household in the CDP was $53,750, and the median income for a family was $58,750. Males had a median income of $75,938 versus $32,500 for females. The per capita income for the CDP was $13,382. There were 16.7% of families and 15.6% of the population living below the poverty line, including no under eighteens and none of those over 64.
