= Chenega Island =

Island in Chugach Census Area, Alaska, United States

Coordinates: 60°18′53″N 148°04′18″W

Chenega Island is an island in Prince William Sound in the U.S. state of Alaska. It is the traditional home to the community of Chenega, though much of its population eventually migrated to Chenega Bay on nearby Evans Island after the 1964 Good Friday earthquake and accompanying tsunami. Chenega Island and its surrounding habitat were also heavily impacted by the 1989 Exxon Valdez oil spill. The island has a land area of 57.084 km^{2} (22.04 sq mi) and, after the mass emigration, was unpopulated as of the 2000 census.

== Demographics ==
Historical population
| Census | Pop. | Note | %± |
|---|---|---|---|
| 1880 | 80 | | — |
| 1900 | 140 | | — |
| 1930 | 90 | | — |
| 1940 | 95 | | 5.6% |
| 1950 | 91 | | −4.2% |
| 1960 | 61 | | −33.0% |
U.S. Decennial Census

The original settlement of Chenega on Chenega Island first appeared on the 1880 U.S. Census as an unincorporated village. It did not appear on the 1890 census, but was separately returned in 1900. It did not appear again until 1930 and 1940 when it was erroneously called "Chanega." It was returned again in 1950 and 1960 as Chenega. With the destruction of the village in 1964 and departure of most of its remaining residents, it ceased to appear on the census as a separate village. The present (new) Chenega, a census-designated place (CDP), is located on Evans Island.
