= Chugach Census Area, Alaska =

Census area in Alaska, United States

- Borough
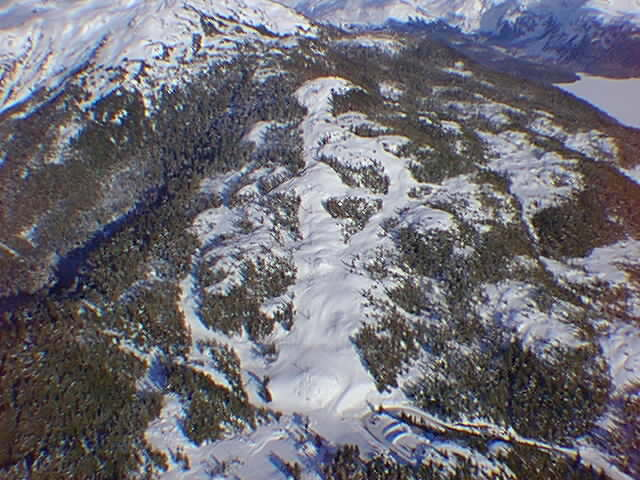
- Aerial view of Mount Eyak ski area, located in the Chugach Census Area, and location of the oldest working chairlift in North America

- Location within the U.S. state of Alaska
- Coordinates: 60°29′N 146°12′W
- Country: United States
- State: Alaska
- Founded: January 2, 2019
- Named for: Chugach Mountains
- Largest city: Valdez

Area
  - Total: 9,530 sq mi (24,700 km^{2})

Population (2020)
  - Total: 7,102
  - Estimate (2025): 6,553 ▼
  - Density: 0.7/sq mi (0.27/km^{2})
- Time zone: UTC−9 (Alaska)
  - Summer (DST): UTC−8 (ADT)
- Congressional district: At-large

Chugach Census Area is a census area located in the state of Alaska, United States. It is part of the Unorganized Borough and therefore has no seat of government. On January 2, 2019, it was split from the Valdez–Cordova Census Area (of which it claims to be the successor), along with neighboring Copper River Census Area.

As of the 2020 census, the census area had a population of 7,102; its largest communities are the cities of Valdez and Cordova.

== Demographics ==
Chugach Census Area, Alaska – Racial and ethnic composition Note: the US Census treats Hispanic/Latino as an ethnic category. This table excludes Latinos from the racial categories and assigns them to a separate category. Hispanics/Latinos may be of any race.
| Race / Ethnicity (NH = Non-Hispanic) | Pop 2020 | 2020 |
|---|---|---|
| White alone (NH) | 4,768 | 67.14% |
| Black or African American alone (NH) | 46 | 0.65% |
| Native American or Alaska Native alone (NH) | 657 | 9.25% |
| Asian alone (NH) | 527 | 7.42% |
| Native Hawaiian or Pacific Islander alone (NH) | 61 | 0.86% |
| Other race alone (NH) | 26 | 0.37% |
| Mixed race or Multiracial (NH) | 620 | 8.73% |
| Hispanic or Latino (any race) | 397 | 5.59% |
| Total | 7,102 | 100.00% |

As of the 2020 census, the census area had a population of 7,102. The median age was 37.7 years, with 23.2% of residents under the age of 18 and 12.7% aged 65 or older. For every 100 females there were 112.4 males, and for every 100 females age 18 and over there were 113.8 males age 18 and over.

The racial makeup of the census area was 69.1% White, 0.7% Black or African American, 9.4% American Indian and Alaska Native, 7.4% Asian, 0.9% Native Hawaiian and Pacific Islander, 1.8% from some other race, and 10.7% from two or more races. Hispanic or Latino residents of any race comprised 5.6% of the population.

0.0% of residents lived in urban areas, while 100.0% lived in rural areas.

There were 2,788 households in the census area, of which 30.9% had children under the age of 18 living with them and 19.8% had a female householder with no spouse or partner present. About 29.8% of all households were made up of individuals and 8.5% had someone living alone who was 65 years of age or older.

There were 3,565 housing units, of which 21.8% were vacant. Among occupied housing units, 64.0% were owner-occupied and 36.0% were renter-occupied. The homeowner vacancy rate was 0.9% and the rental vacancy rate was 9.4%.

=== 2010 census ===
According to the 2010 United States census (in which it was reported as the "Chugach Census Subarea"), the census area had a population of 6,684; 5,059 (75.7%) of whom were over the age of 18, and 798 (11.9%) of whom were over the age of 65. 5,095 residents (76.2%) were reported as White alone (4,929/73.7% non-Hispanic white), 35 (0.5%) as Black, 637 (9.5%) as American Indian or Alaska Native, 343 (5.1%) as Asian, 41 (0.6%) as Native Hawaiian or other Pacific Islander, 41 (0.6%) as some other race, and 492 (7.4%) as two or more races. 296 people (4.4%) were Hispanic or Latino (they may be of any of the above racial categories).

== Communities ==
=== Cities ===
- Cordova
- Valdez
- Whittier

=== Census-designated places ===
- Chenega
- Tatitlek

=== Unincorporated community ===
- Eyak (Within Cordova)

== Politics ==
Chugach Census Area is Republican leaning, having backed Donald Trump in both 2020 and 2024, the only two elections it has voted in since its creation. Thus, this is one of six counties or county equivalents that have voted Republican for president in every election since they came into existence. (Note: Along with Leslie County, Kentucky (since 1880); Doniphan County, Kansas (since 1864); Poquoson, Virginia (since 1976); Colonial Heights, Virginia (since 1952); and Copper River Census Area, Alaska (since 2020).) However, unlike the Copper River Census Area, it has voted for Democrats in other federal elections, backing Mary Peltola in the 2022 special and regular U.S. House of Representatives election.

United States presidential election results for Chugach Census Area, Alaska
| Year | Republican | | Democratic | | Third party(ies) | |
| Year | No. | % | No. | % | No. | % |
|---|---|---|---|---|---|---|
| 2020 | 1,938 | 54.99% | 1,395 | 39.59% | 191 | 5.42% |
| 2024 | 1,807 | 56.70% | 1,246 | 39.10% | 134 | 4.20% |

== Education ==
School districts with territory in the census area include:

- Chugach School District
- Cordova City School District
- Valdez City School District

== See also ==
- Chugach School District
