= Mount Abbe =

Mountain in Alaska, United States

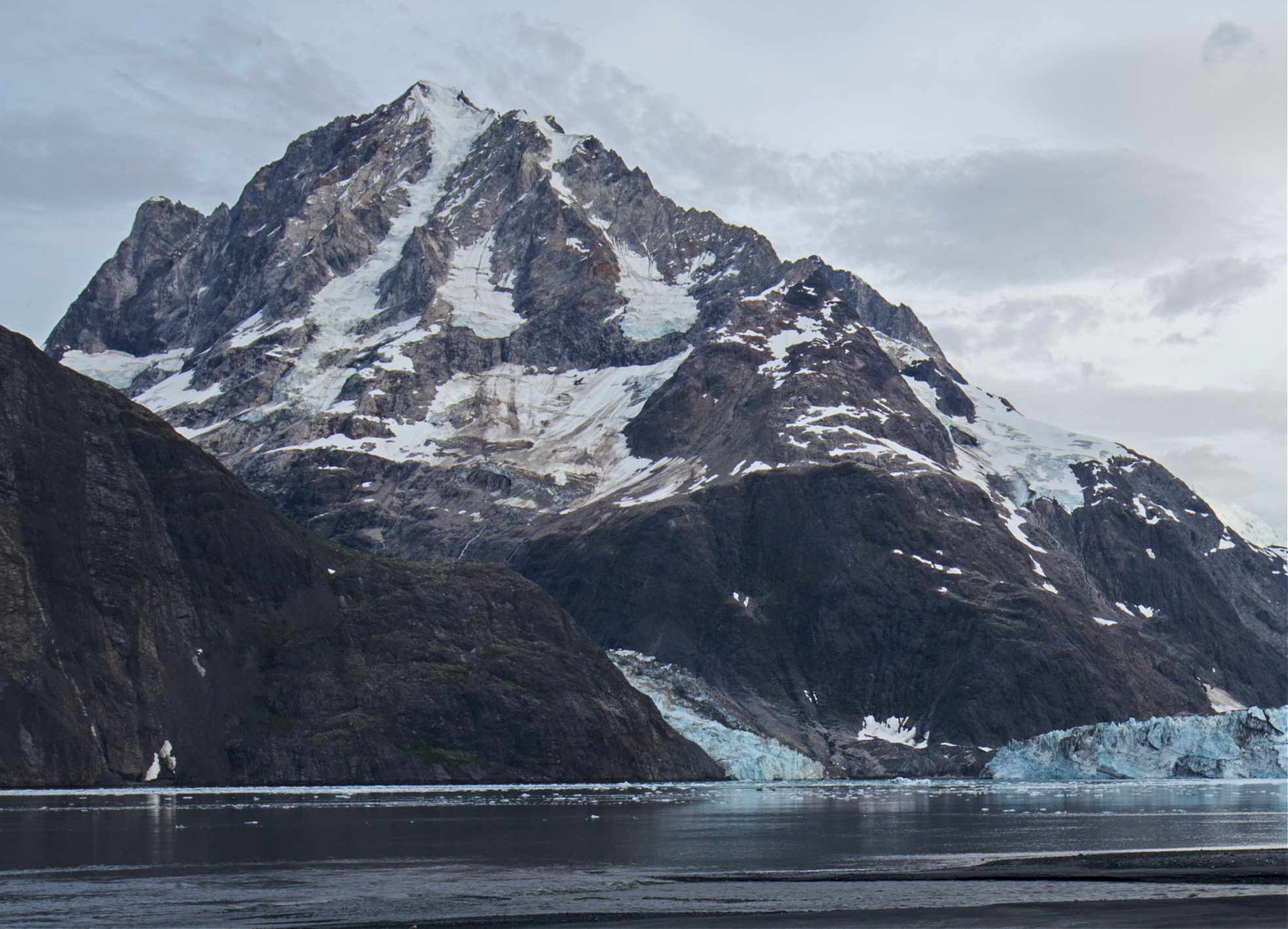
- Mount Abbe, north aspect

Highest point
- Elevation: 8,200 ft (2,500 m)
- Prominence: 938 ft (286 m)
- Coordinates: 58°47′52″N 137°04′41″W

Geography
- Location within Alaska
- Interactive map of Mount Abbe
- Location: Glacier Bay National Park and Preserve; Hoonah-Angoon; Alaska, United States
- Parent range: Fairweather Range; Saint Elias Mountains
- Topo map: USGS Mount Fairweather D-4

Geology
- Rock type: Granite

Climbing
- First ascent: June 11, 1977
- Easiest route: Mountaineering

Mount Abbe is an 8200+ feet (2499+ meter) double summit mountain located in the Fairweather Range of the Saint Elias Mountains, in southeast Alaska. The peak is situated near the terminus of the Johns Hopkins Glacier, within Glacier Bay National Park and Preserve, 100 mi (161 km) northwest of Juneau, and 8.2 mi (13 km) northeast of Mount Orville. Although modest in elevation, relief is significant since the mountain rises up from tidewater in less than two miles. Mount Abbe is often seen and photographed with the Johns Hopkins Glacier, which is a popular destination for cruise ships. The mountain was named in 1936 by William Osgood Field and William Skinner Cooper, of the American Geographical Society, for Cleveland Abbe Jr., (1872-1934), an American geographer. Abbe received a Ph.D. in 1898 from Johns Hopkins University. The Gilman Glacier and Clark Glacier on the mountain's slopes were named for Daniel Coit Gilman, the institution's first president, and William Bullock Clark who was a professor of geology at the university. The mountain's name was officially adopted in 1937 by the United States Geological Survey.

The first ascent of the south summit was made June 11, 1977, by Jim Wickwire and Dusan Jagersky via the Southeast Face. Three days later, Dusan Jagersky was killed while descending an unnamed peak. The first ascent of the north summit was made July 14, 1991, by Walter Gove and William Pilling. The months May through June offer the most favorable weather for climbing Mount Abbe, but it is a challenging climb in any conditions, with few attempts.

== Climate ==
Based on the Köppen climate classification, Mount Abbe has a subarctic climate with cold, snowy winters, and mild summers. Temperatures can drop below −20 °C with wind chill factors below −30 °C. This climate supports the Clark, Johns Hopkins, and Gilman Glaciers on its slopes. Precipitation runoff and meltwater from its hanging glaciers drains into Johns Hopkins Inlet.

== Gallery ==
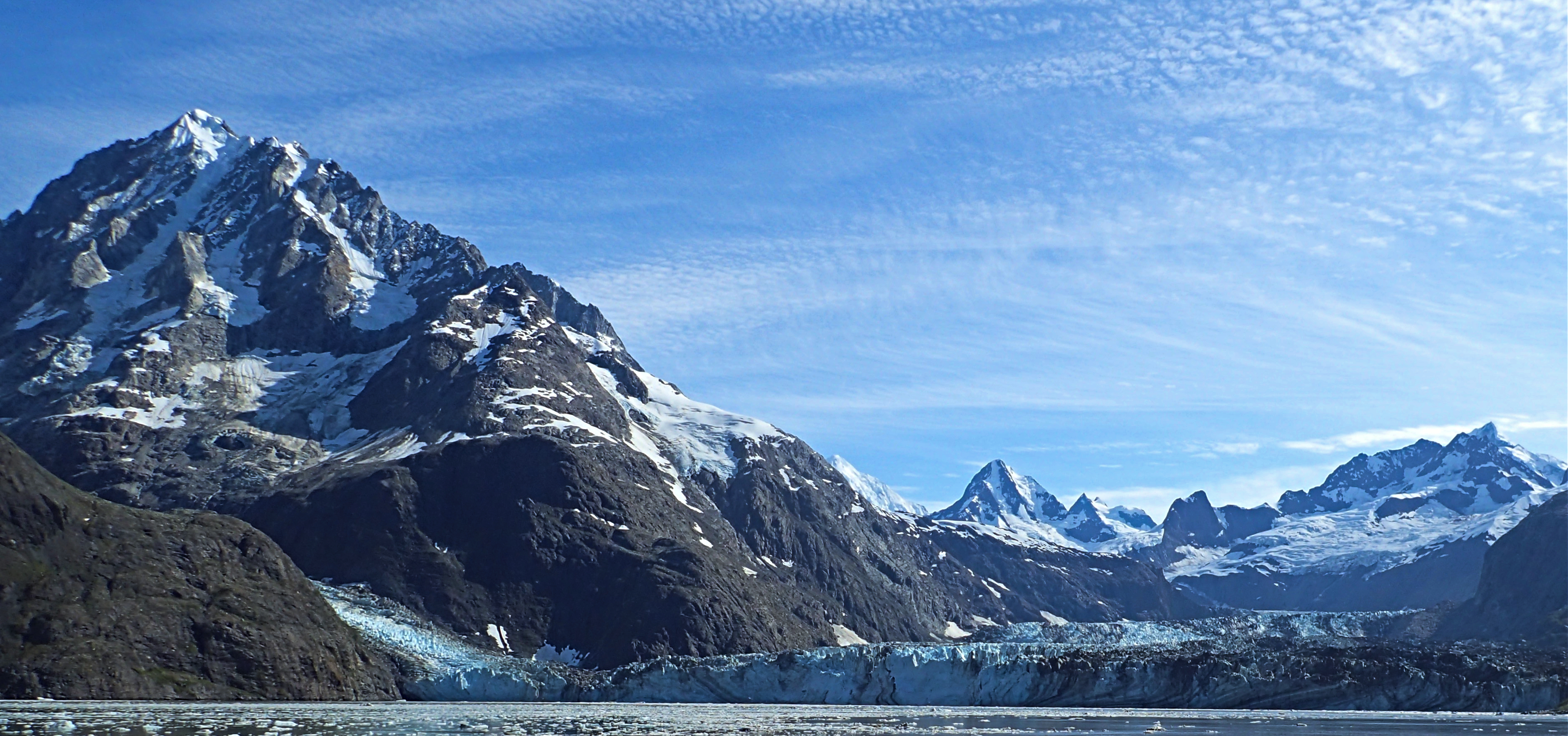
Mount Abbe with Johns Hopkins Glacier
(Fifty Years of Alaskan Statehood centered in back)

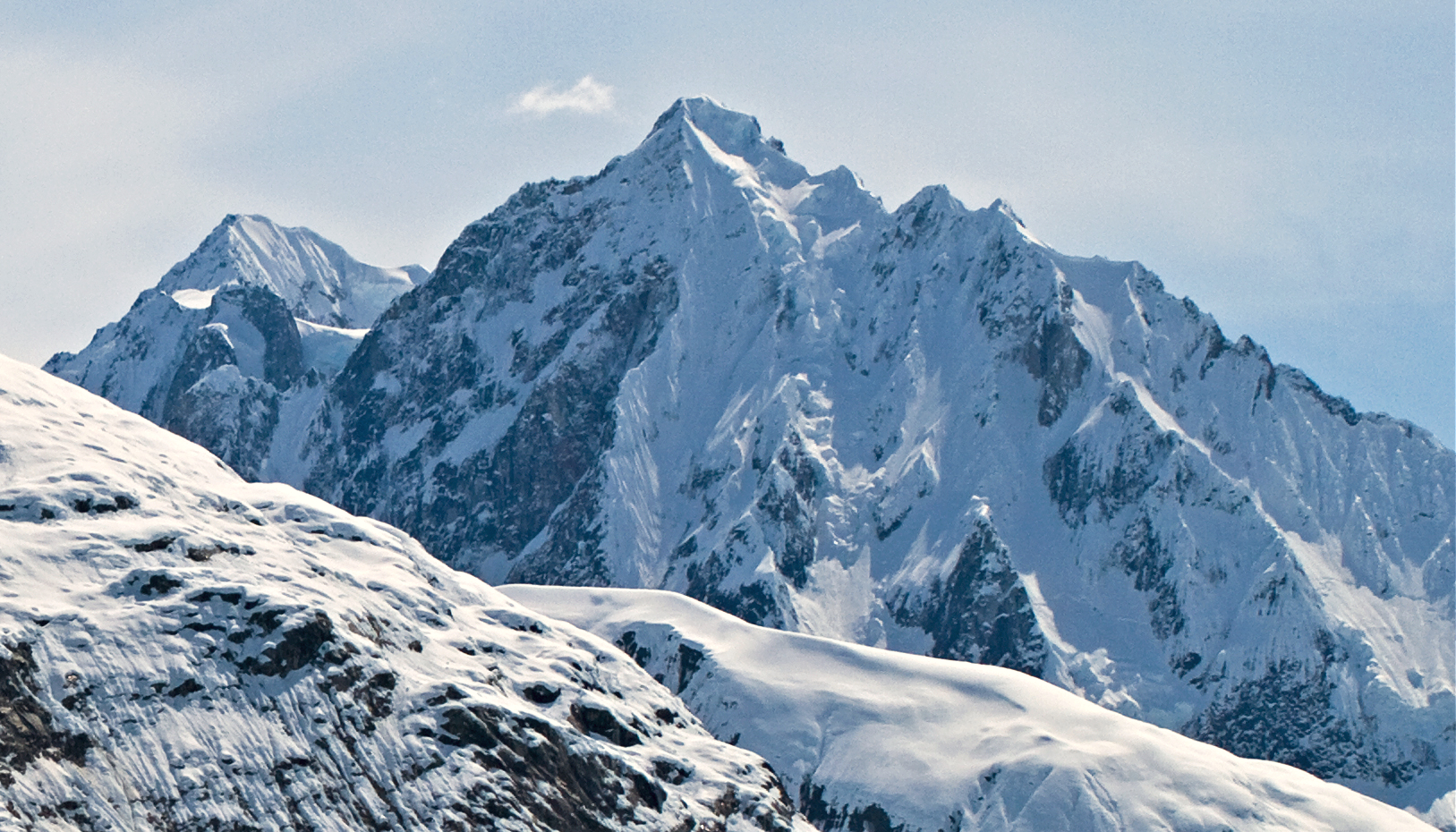
A glimpse of its two summits

== See also ==
- List of mountain peaks of Alaska
- Geography of Alaska
