= Glacier Bay =

Glacier Bay may refer to:

- Glacier Bay Basin, in south-eastern Alaska, United States, encompasses the eponymous Glacier Bay
- Glacier Bay National Park and Preserve, a national park of the United States located in Southeast Alaska west of Juneau surrounding Glacier Bay
- Glacier Bay Kitchen and Bath Fixtures, a house brand of Home Depot
