= Glacier Bay Basin =

Bay in southeastern Alaska

Coordinates: 58°42′N 136°09′W

Glacier Bay, Alaska
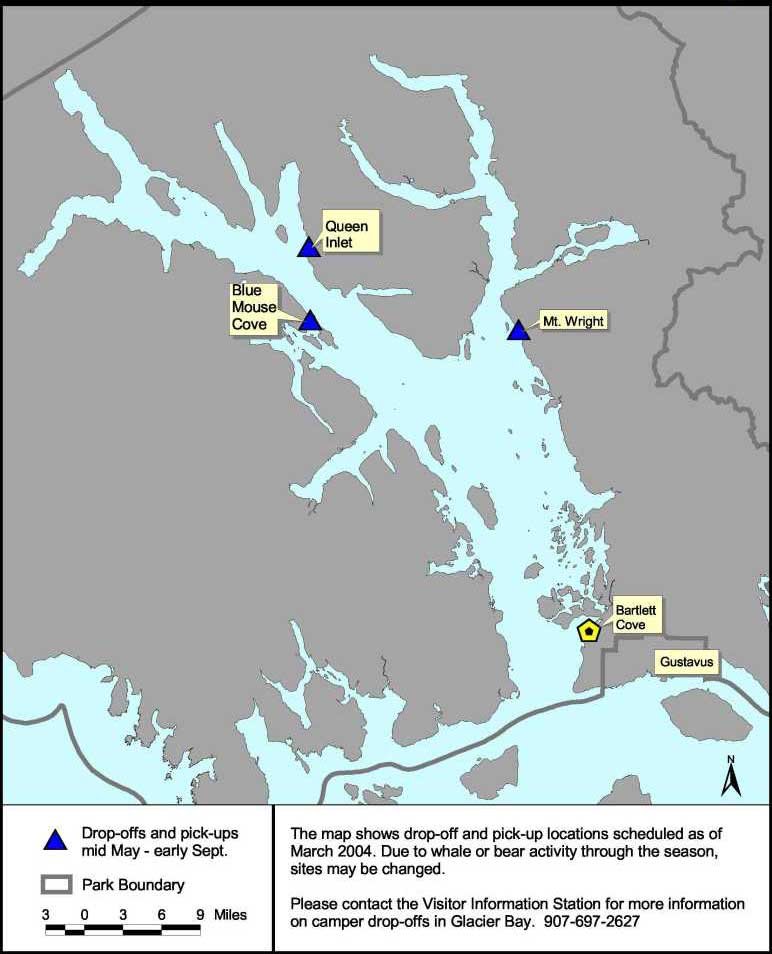
- Landsat map of Glacier Bay

- Location within Alaska

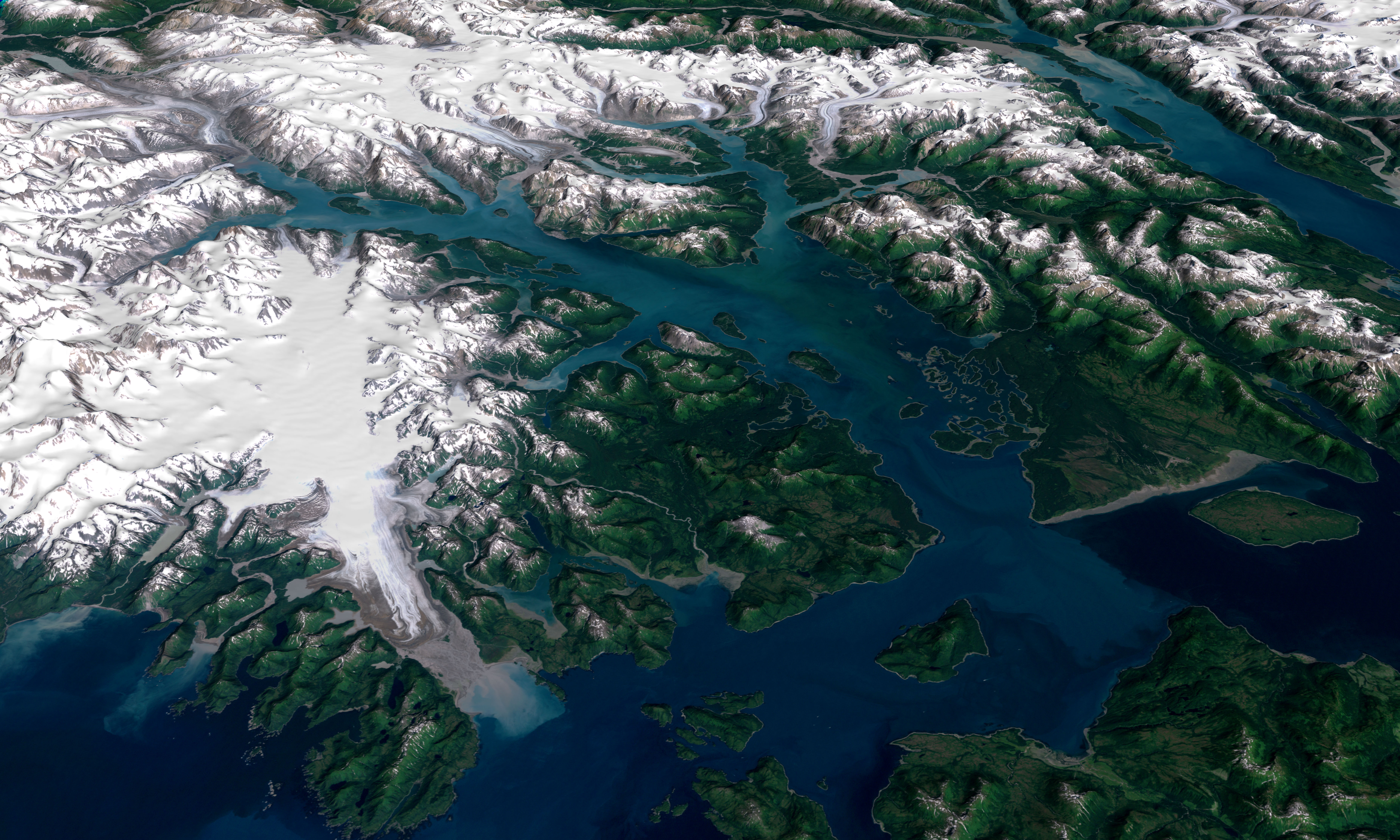
- Landsat image of Glacier Bay
- Location: Alaska, United States
- Type: Bay
- Primary inflows: Pacific Ocean
- Basin countries: United States and Canada
- Max. length: 65 miles (105 km)
- Max. width: 15 miles (24 km)
- Surface area: 3,283,000 acres (1,329,000 ha)
- Average depth: 800 feet (240 m)
- Max. depth: 1,410 feet (430 m)

Glacier Bay Basin, in southeastern Alaska, United States, encompasses the eponymous Glacier Bay and the surrounding mountains and glaciers. It was first proclaimed a U.S. National Monument on February 25, 1925, and later enlarged and re-designated as Glacier Bay National Park and Preserve on December 2, 1980, under the Alaska National Interest Lands Conservation Act, covering an area of 3,283,000 acres (1,329,000 hectares). In 1986, UNESCO declared an area of 57,000 acres (23,000 hectares) within the park a World Biosphere Reserve, making it the largest UNESCO-protected biosphere in the world. In 1992, UNESCO included the area as part of a much larger World Heritage Site, extending over an area of 24,300,000 acre (9,800,000 ha) which also includes Wrangell–St. Elias National Park and Preserve, as well as Kluane National Park and Reserve and Tatshenshini-Alsek Provincial Park, both in Canada. Part of Glacier Bay National Park is also designated a wilderness area covering 2,658,000 acres (1,076,000 hectares).

Current glaciers cover a combined area of 1,375 square miles (3,560 km^{2}), accounting for 27 percent of the park area. Until the early 1700s, the area was a single large glacier of solid ice. It has since retreated and evolved into the largest protected water area park in the world. Glacier Bay, on the Gulf of Alaska, was once part of the Grand Pacific Glacier, about 4,000 feet (1,200 m) thick and around 20 miles (32 km) in width. Over the last 200 years the glaciers have retreated, exposing 65 miles (105 km) of ocean, and in this process have divided into 20 other separate glaciers. In 1890, the name "Glacier Bay" was given to the bay by Captain Lester A. Beardslee of the U.S. Navy.

Glacier Bay has many scenic branches, inlets, lagoons, islands, and channels that hold prospects for scientific exploration and tourism. The area is popular as a cruise ship destination during the summer. However, there are restrictions imposed by the National Park Service on the number of vessels that can operate in a day: two cruise ships, three tour boats, six charter vessels, and 25 private vessels. The bay received an average of 443,975 recreational visitors annually from 2012 to 2021, with 89,768 visitors in 2021.

== History ==
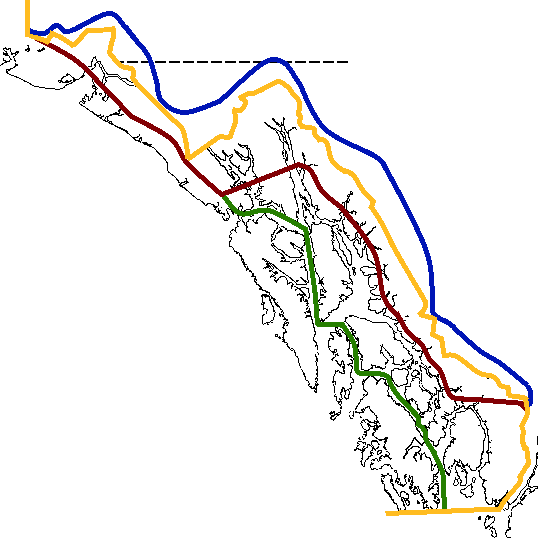
Varying claims in the Alaska panhandle before arbitration in 1903. In blue is the border claimed by the United States, in red is the border claimed by Canada and the United Kingdom. Green is the boundary asserted by British Columbia. Yellow indicates the modern border.

Geologists believe that Glacier Bay existed during a minimum of four glacial periods ending with the Little Ice Age, which has a 4,000-year-old record, as the latest period. All glaciers in the park today are said to be remnants from this glacial period.

The earliest recorded history of the Glacier Bay area starts with the 1741 Russian expedition led by Vitus Bering and Aleksei Chirikov. La Pérouse (after whom one of the glaciers in the bay was named subsequently) established contact with the local inhabitants, the Tlingit at Lutya Bay, in 1786, though traditionally the Tlingit lived in the area before the last glacial advance forced them out. This was followed by the Russians staking their claim to the region.

In 1794, Joseph Whidbey, master of the Discovery during George Vancouver's 1791–1795 expedition, reported that his exploration of this part of the coast was blocked by a wall of 2 miles (3.2 km) width and 1,200 metres (3,900 feet) thick. Vancouver claimed the land for Britain in conflict with an earlier Russian claim, which was resolved by the Anglo-Russian Convention of 1825. The United States purchased Alaska from the Russians in 1867 with a claim under that treaty of owning all lands up to "the summit of the mountains situated parallel to the coast". The United States and Canada agreed that an arbitration board would draw the exact boundary. The arbitration award given in 1903 resolved the Alaska boundary dispute by drawing a line that linked the mountain peaks in this area. Because the agreement froze the exact boundary in 1903, further retreat of the glacier does not alter the boundary as the coast extends northward. As a result, the northern edge of Tarr Inlet is approaching the boundary.

With the discovery of gold in the area, the resulting gold rush brought miners to the area. In 1890, Willoughby Island in Glacier Bay was the scene of a meeting between the miners, which was followed by the establishment of the Berry mining district. In the 1890s, a salt mine was established at Bartlett Cove. Fox farms and a cannery were also established; the cannery was abandoned in 1935.

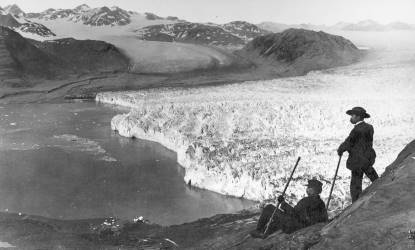
A Frank Roche photo of LaRoche (standing) and T. J. Richardson (seated) on the shoulder of Mount Wright overlooking John Muir.

John Muir, the naturalist, conservationist and scientist, pioneered the focus of the world on the Glacier Bay phenomenon. During his research Muir witnessed the glaciers in action. He had noted that the ice had retreated almost all the way up. In his 1915 memoir Travels in Alaska, Muir reported that when he first visited the Bay in 1879, this wall was 48 miles (77 km) wide and retreated from the sea by 44 miles (71 km). Today it has retreated to 65 miles (105 km), as a remnant of the old wall of the glacier system, and has 16 major tidewater glaciers (10, 12 and 15 are also mentioned in some references).

In 1899, wealthy railroad magnate Edward Harriman arranged for a maritime expedition called the Harriman Alaska Expedition comprising an elite community of scientists, artists, photographers, and naturalists to explore and document the Alaskan coast. The expedition spent two months traveling from Seattle, along the coast of Alaska, to Siberia, and back again. In many ways, the expedition was an intersection of 19th-century and 20th-century science. The expedition claimed to have discovered some 600 species that were new to science, including 38 new fossil species. They charted the geographic distribution of many species. They discovered an unmapped fiord and named several glaciers. John Muir and his friend Harriman, both of whom were members of the expedition, were instrumental in governmental lobbying on National Park legislation. The Harriman expedition was instrumental in documenting the extent of the glacier's retreat in 1899.

Muir was seeking corroboration of the continental glaciation theories of Louis Agassiz, whose controversial Etudes sur les Glaciers was published in 1840. The year 1893 recorded the arrival of the first tourist ship at the entrance to the Bay, at Bartlett Cove, which over the years has become central to the tourist trade in the Glacier Bay. By 1916, the Grand Pacific Glacier was at the head of Tarr Inlet, about 65 miles (105 km) from Glacier Bay's mouth. This is the fastest documented glacial retreat ever. In 1925, Glacier Bay was declared a national monument.

For centuries, Glacier Bay has been the homeland of the Huna Tlingit native tribes of Alaska. Their oral traditions indicate being displaced by the last advance of the glacier. They continue to be part of the Bay residents and it is woven into the "tapestry of their lives".

== Geography ==
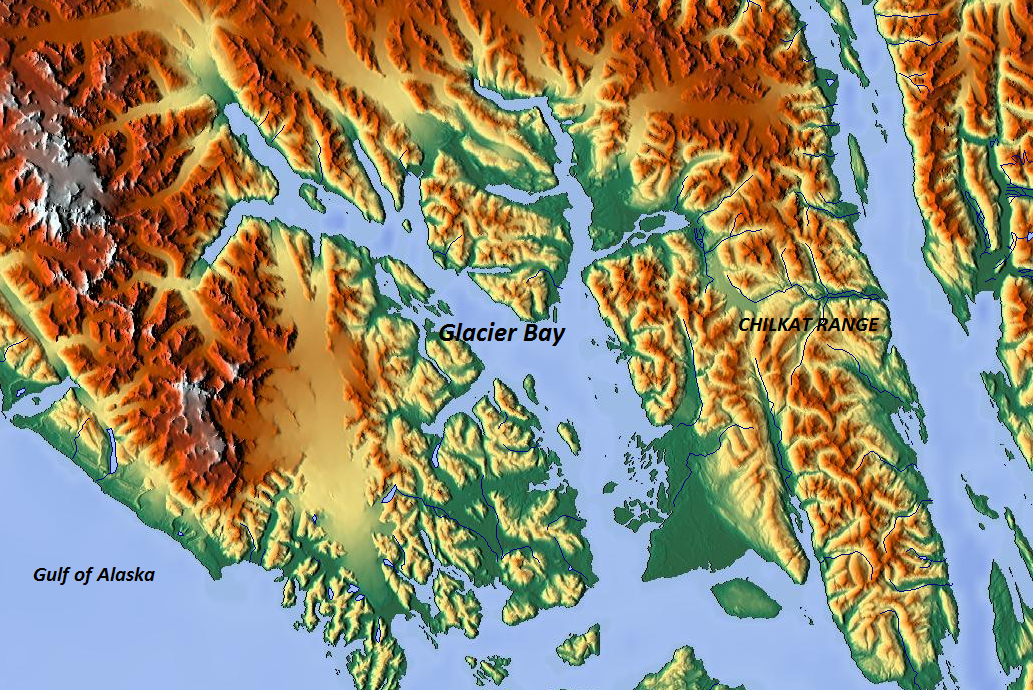
Relief map of Glacier Bay

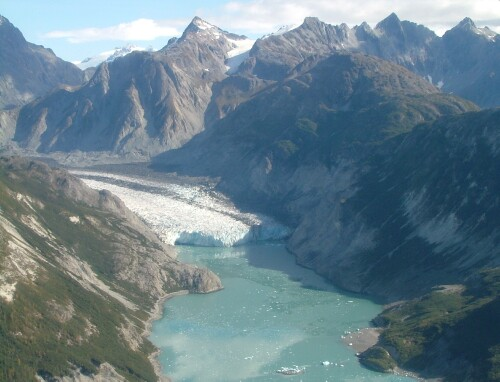
McBride Glacier, Glacier Bay, in 2004

Glacier Bay is subsumed within the larger about 3.3-million-acre (13,000 km^{2}) National Park and Preserve. The preserve, which is a spectacular ensemble of marine and terrestrial life, is delimited by: The Tongass National Forest borders on the east and north east; by the international boundary with Tatshenshini-Alsek Wilderness Provincial Park in British Columbia, Canada on the north; by the waters of Cross Sound and Icy Strait border on the south; and by the Pacific Ocean on the west. When President Calvin Coolidge declared the Glacial Bay to be a national monument, in 1925, the objective clearly stated was:

a number of tidewater glaciers ... in a magnificent setting of lofty peaks ... ; a great variety of forest covering consisting of mature areas, bodies of youthful trees which have become established since the retreat of the ice which should be preserved in absolutely natural condition, and great stretches now bare that will become forested in the course of the next century; a unique opportunity for the scientific study of glacial behavior and of resulting movements and developments of flora and fauna and of certain valuable relics of interglacial forests; historic interest, having been visited by explorers and scientists since the early voyages of Vancouver in 1794 who left valuable records of such visits and explorations.

The Alaska National Interest Lands Conservation Act of 1980 changed its status to a National Park and Reserve covering an area of 3,283,000 acres (1,329,000 ha) including 57,000 acres (23,000 ha) as a preserve: However,2,670,000 acres (1,080,000 ha) have been declared as Wilderness. The Glacier Bay also encompasses about 400 acres (160 ha) of two mining claim groups, and about 3,000 acres (1,200 ha) allotted to Alaska Natives; some small private tracts are also reported within the limits of the Glacier Bay.

The Glacier Bay Basin is now a myriad combination of tidewater glaciers, snow-capped mountain ranges, ocean coastlines, deep fjords, and freshwater rivers and lakes that provide widely varying land and seascape and "hosts a mosaic of plant communities and a variety of marine and terrestrial wildlife."

Glacier Bay is covered with 1,375 square miles (3,560 km^{2}) of glaciers which accounts for 27% of the Park area with most glaciers originating in mountains with elevation range of 8,000–15,000 feet (2,400–4,600 m). There are over 50 named glaciers (both tidewater and terrestrial glaciers); 10 tide water glaciers – one on the east arm of the bay and all others on the west arm reach shorelines and calved) (literal meaning: "breaking off") to produce icebergs. Seven of these glaciers are reported to be active tidewater glaciers, which depict the calving phenomenon, which means that they break into icebergs and fall into the sea with thundering noise raising large waves. The McBride Glacier is the only tidewater glacier in the eastern arm at a distance of 40 nautical miles (74 km) from Bartlett Cove. Of the other glaciers on the western arm, Johns Hopkins Glacier is at the farthest end – 63 nautical miles (117 km) from the entrance to the bay while the Margerie Glacier is about 55 nautical miles (102 km) away.

The National Park Service manages a total of 607,099 acres (245,684 ha) of marine waters of the Glacier Bay. It covers a coastline of 1,180 square miles (3,100 km^{2}) including some reach of the coast outside the Bay. Glacier Bay Basin as such has a coast line of 760 square miles (2,000 km^{2}) including all islands; the coast line without counting islands accounts for statute 563 miles (906 km). The deepest point in the bay is 1,410 feet (430 m) below sea level with the diurnal tides occurring every 6 hours, with a tide range of −5 to 18 feet (−1.5 to 5.5 m) (upper limit of the range is reported to be 23 feet (7.0 m).

According to the recorded findings, most glaciers are retreating except the Johns Hopkins Glacier, which is advancing and the Margerie Glacier which is stable. The glacier thinning or retreating process is attributed to lesser incidence of snowfall on the hills, raising temperatures in the winter season followed by decrease in cloud cover and precipitation during the summer season.

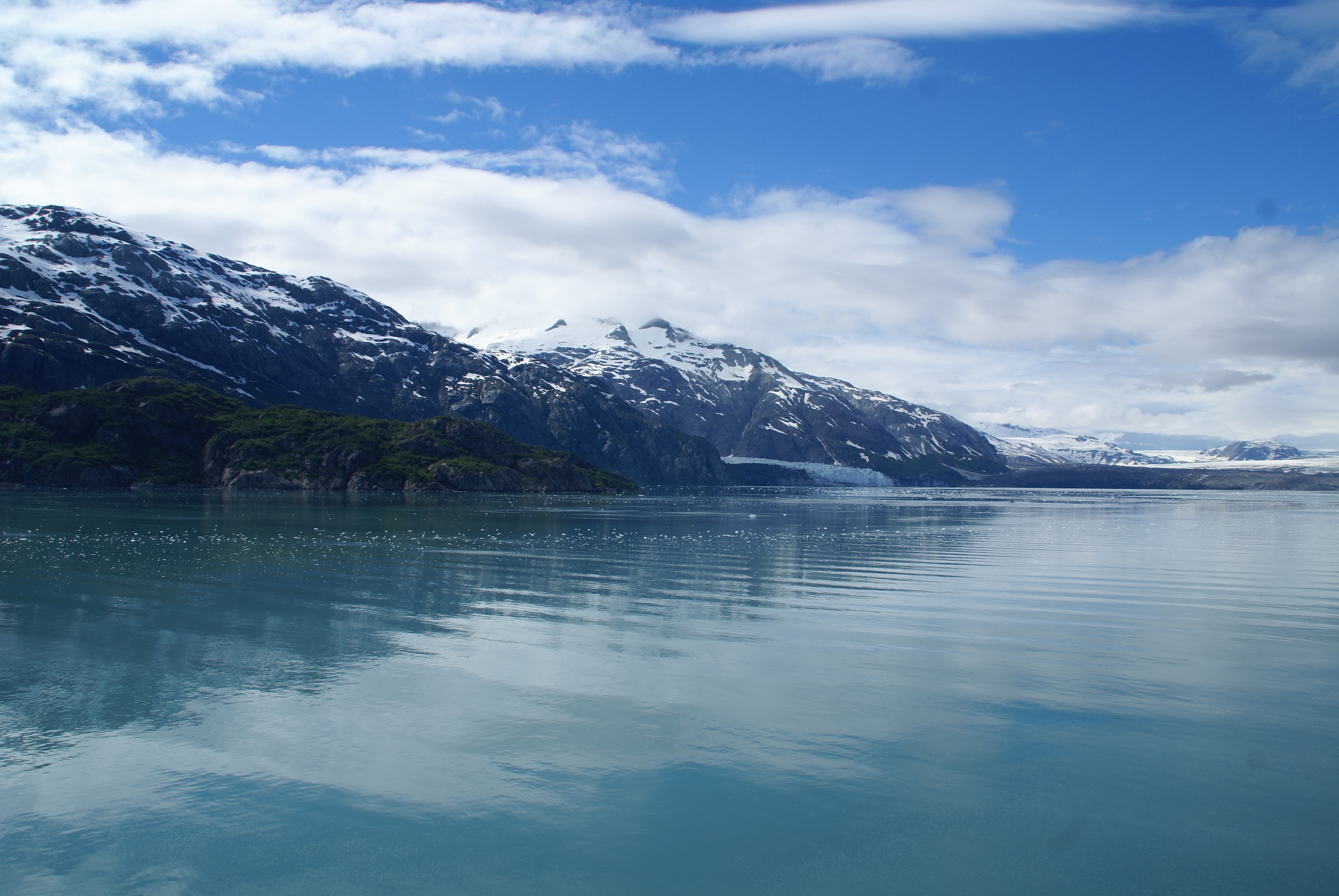
Tarr Inlet near Margerie and Grand Pacific Glaciers

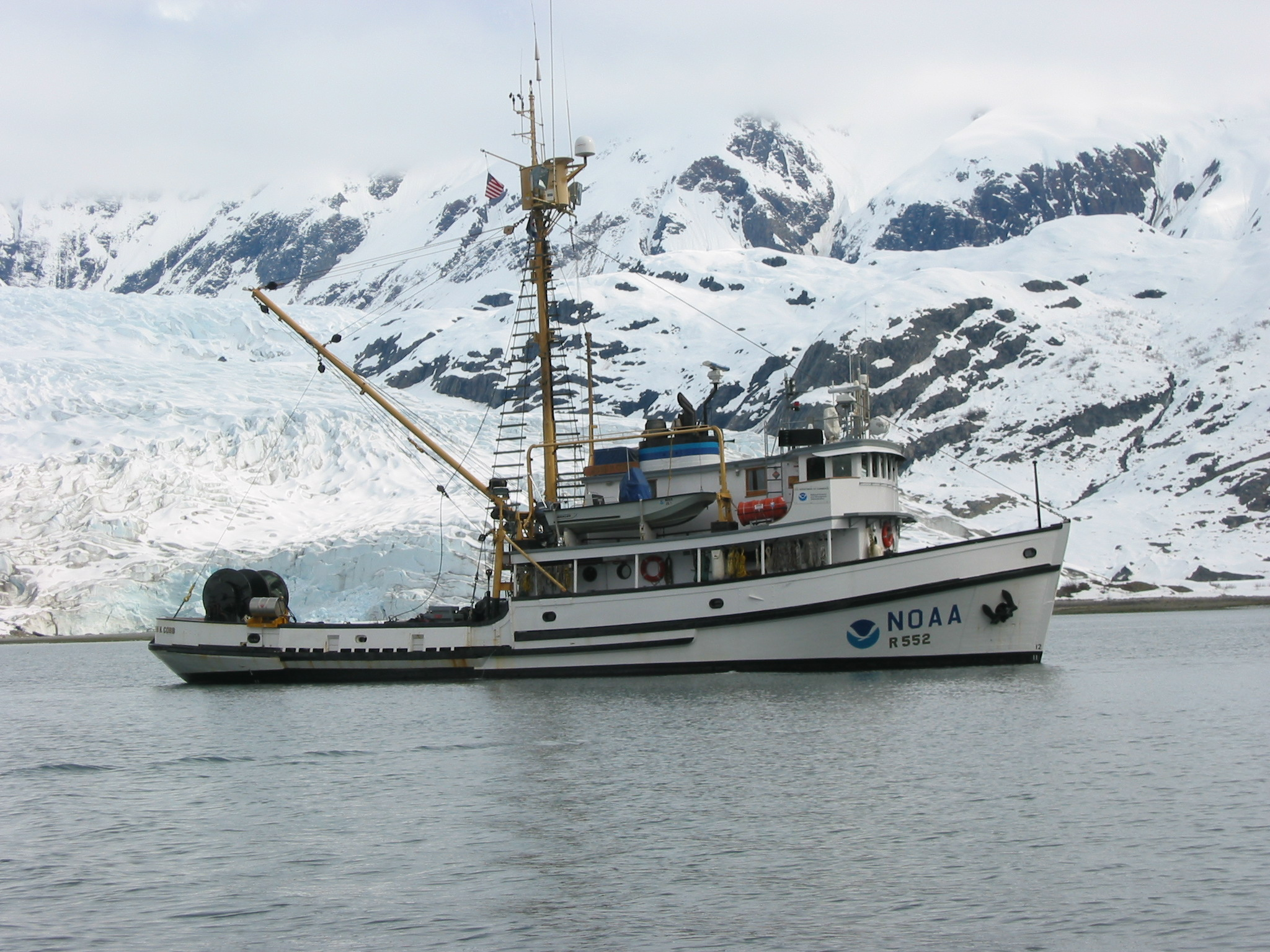
A Research ship of NOAA in the Glacier Bay

Post Little Ice Age Rebound in the Glacier Bay Basin has been studied by researchers of the Geophysical Institute, University of Alaska Fairbanks, Alaska in association with National Park and Preserve Service, under a National Science Foundation grant using GPS geodesy combined with studies of raised shorelines and tide gauges. The studies have established that the fastest rates of glacier rebound in the world are now taking place in the Glacier Bay region. The studies have also reported that "these adjustments to LIA loading and unloading are producing significant stresses on the earth's crust which can affect seismicity and regional tectonics. The rising land also is continually changing the geomorphic texture of shoreline throughout the Park and causing changes in hydrologic patterns, erosion, and sedimentation. All these changes have a direct impact on the ecosystems of the Park."

Glacier Bay can be approached only by boats or ships and partly by hiking along three trails (10 miles (16 km)) and by kayaking along 700 miles (1,100 km)) of shore line. The nearest road head and airport are in the small town of Gustavus, which is known as the southern gateway to the Glacier Bay. However, Gustavus as such is approachable only by air and sea. Juneau, the capital of Alaska, is about 60 miles (97 km)). The approximate distance between Anchorage and Juneau is 567 miles (912 km).

The advancing and retreating characteristics of the glaciers in the Glacier Bay are explained in simple terms as a steady state of snow getting converted into ice on the hills. Ice, as a lens of water on the base of bedrock, slides by gravity downwards. The good moraine of rock and rubble insulates it from water erosion. As a result, during freezing temperatures that exists all the year, the glacier advances. When the insulation and erosion effect of the hills gets reduced erosion sets in and along with rising temperatures the glaciers start retreating. Another unpredictable phenomenon that is observed in many glaciers in the Glacier Bay is that of calving. Calving is a process in which blocks of ice get detached or break off from the glacier, irrespective of weather conditions, all the year round, and crash into the sea with thundering noise creating a boiling like turbulence.

The Glacier Bay was closed for ships almost a decade after the 1899 earthquake (magnitude 8.4 on the Richter Scale). This was on account of the shattered ice blocks which filled the Bay consequent to the earthquake. Even though the Bay is in volcanic activity region of the Pacific "Rim of Fire", active volcanoes have not been recorded within the Glacier Bay Basin. However, these two factors have been inferred to have effects on the environmental changes occurring in the Glacier Bay.

=== Archeological findings ===
Archaeological findings have been unearthed at two sites in the Glacier Bay, which links the region to Holocene period. On the Baranoff Island, a prehistoric finding dates occupation of the region between 3200 and 4600 BP. Another finding in the form of a house, microlithic tools and heavy wood working tools at Ground Hog Bay has been dated to about 2000 BP. This is stated to be "towards the end of the Hypsithermal (thermal maximum climatic fluctuation) and the beginning of the Little Ice Age". Thus, it has been interpreted by comparison with similarly placed locations in the region, such as the southern coast of British Columbia, that the type of culture seen here is comparable to the culture that existed during historic times on the Northwest Coast. The potential for finding more such sites are stated to be high.

=== Ethnographic aspects ===
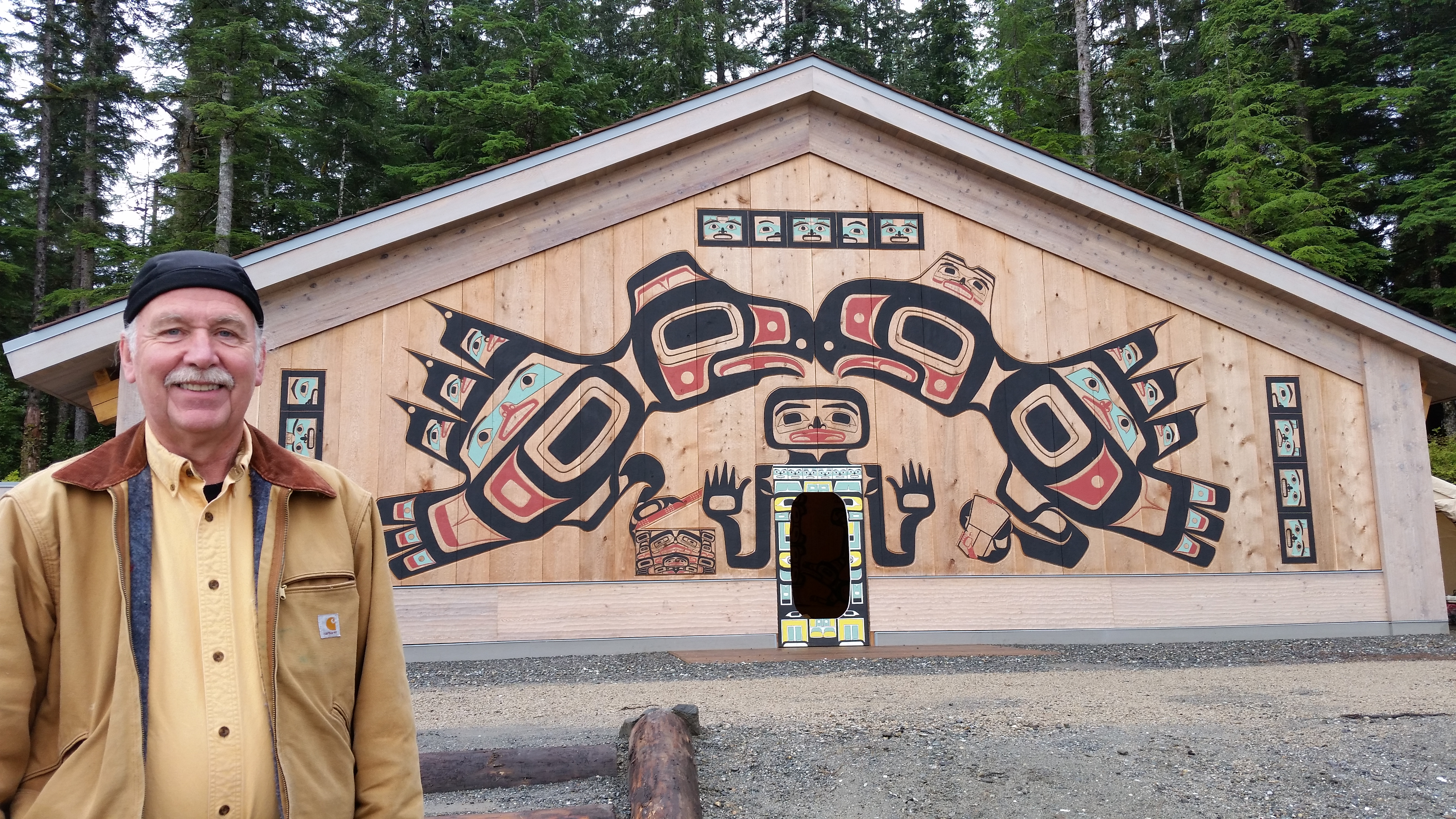
Hoonah Tlingit Tribal House artist Kaachyaas, "Tears of the Glacier"

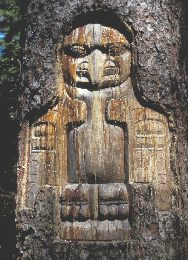
A Tlingit trail marker in the Glacier Bay Park and Preserve

The Tlingits regard Glacier Bay as their sacred homeland. The National Park Service takes the view that "Glacier Bay National Park is the spiritual homeland of the Huna Tlingit, and Glacier Bay National Preserve is the homeland of the Ghunaaxhoo Kwaan unit of the Yakutat Tlingit Tribe". The tribes' oral history supports that they were pushed out and migrated south when the glacier advanced. They moved back to the area when the Glacier retreated in the 1880s. There are 60 odd proto-historic or historic sites in the Glacier Bay, which are identified with Tlingit Indians or European Americans. They are an integral part of Northwest Coast people inferred to be belonging to Haida, Tlingit or Eyak clans. Their settlements existed even in the 1880s in Dry Bay, Excursion Inlet, Point Couverden and the Port Frederick area (now known as Hoonah) and Dundas Bay. A Tlingit cemetery of the period has also been located in the park area. Seasonal hunting, gathering and fishing was their way of life, woven around a central village, with shifting fishing and hunting camps. The food source of the natives was the rich Salmon fish resources of the area. A complex society evolved with rich artistic traditions. Tlingits claimed their fishing-dependent lifestyle was helped during the National Monument years, which kept out commercial fishing. After the area became a National Park, their fishing and hunting activities were curtailed except for certain religious exemptions. However, the National Park administration is closely interacting with the Tlingits to foster their cultural heritage. They are allowed access to the park to "harvest berries, a variety of seafoods, and traditional use items such as spruce roots and mountain goat hair (for weaving traditional blankets)". In addition the park is planning to establish a Tlingit longhouse near its main office, where Tlingit culture would be fully highlighted and also facilitate holding of cultural events.

=== Climate ===
The bay has a cool wet, coastal temperate rainforest climate. Three climatic zones have been discerned in the Glacier Bay; the outer coast along the Gulf of Alaska, which records mild temperatures and higher precipitation. However, it experiences less snowfall, the upper Glacier Bay where it is much colder and heavy snowfall occurs, and the lower Glacier Bay, which experiences heavy rainfall throughout the year.

In the Bay as a whole, the summer temperatures vary between 50 °F (10 °C)) and 60 °F (16 °C), while the winter temperatures lie in the range of 20 to 30 °F (−7 to −1 °C), with minimum going up to −10 °F (−23 °C).

Annual precipitation is in the form of rainfall and snowfall. On an average, 228 days are recorded as precipitation days per year, and precipitation is in the range of 70–80 inches (180–200 cm) including 14 feet (4.3 m) of annual snowfall; the highest recorded snowfall is of the order of 100 feet (30 m) in the Fairweather Mountains.

== Flora and fauna ==
The environment of Glacier Bay has been categorized under four main land ecosystems namely, the wet tundra, the coastal western hemlock/Sitka spruce forest, the alpine tundra, and the glaciers and ice fields; within the Bay proper, further break up into three major marine ecosystems are marked namely, "within in and around continental shelf, wave-beaten coasts, and fjord estuaries."

Plants progressively moved in as the glacier retreated, so a 200-year-old spruce and hemlock forest presently exists at the entrance, grading up to more primitive plants such as mosses and lichens at the head of the bay. Because of current local climate change some glaciers are now retreating at a rate of up to a quarter of a mile per year.

The retreat of the glaciers exposed land areas and as a result "Plant communities and animal populations ranging from "pioneer species" in areas recently exposed by receding glaciers to climax communities in older coastal and alpine ecosystems" have emerged.

Wild life

In general, wild life in Glacier Bay, has been identified under aqua fauna, avifauna and fauna; 160 marine and estuarine fish species, 242 bird species and 41 species of mammals have been recorded.

Bears

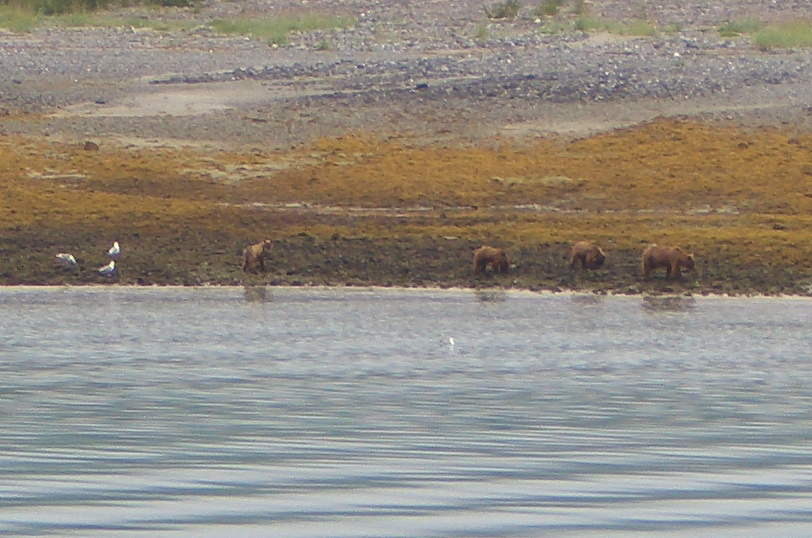
Brown bear near Russul Island

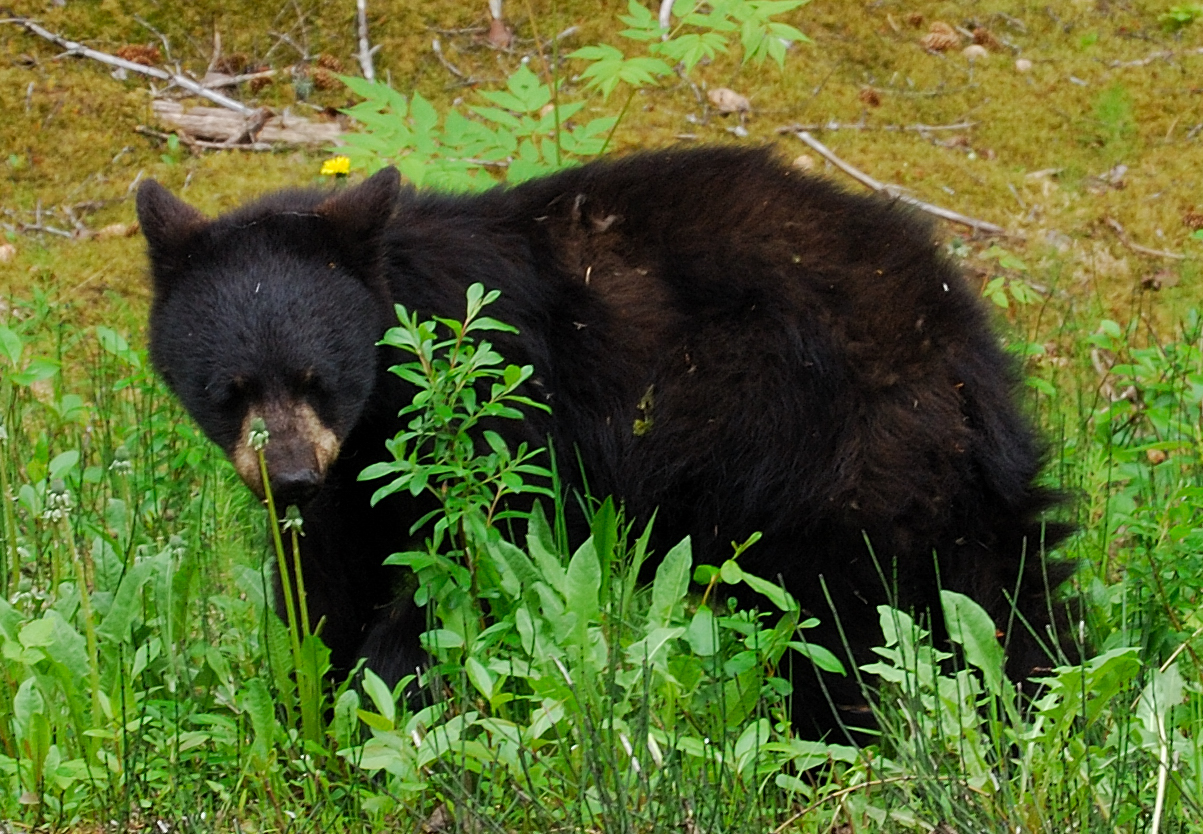
A black bear yearling

Bears, both black and brown, are seen in Glacier Bay in the intertidal zone which they frequent for foraging. They are also seen "scraping barnacles off of rocks and munching mussels." Invariably they are spotted wandering alone along the beaches of the Glacier Bay in search of salmon. The habitats of the black bears are generally the southern forested areas of the bay. However, the brown bears are mostly found in the northern, more recently glaciated zones of the Glacier Bay. Occasionally, black bears are sighted near the glaciers or near Gustavus town. Black bears with black dots and brown bears with brown dots have been seen over the last 10 years. Their travel routes have been identified as along the easy tracks such as along beaches, stream beds and river valleys. The most commonly identified locations for sighting bears in the Glacier Bay are: The Bartlett Cove, the Bartlett River, the Beardslee Islands and North and South Sandy Cove locations for black bears, while brown bears are seen to the north of Tidal Inlet in the west arm of glacier and north of Adams Inlet in the east arm. They are also seen swimming in the Bay, crossing from one bank to the other. Salmon are their favorite food, apart from bumblebees, sand fleas, bird eggs, birds, voles and marine mammal carcasses.

Whale

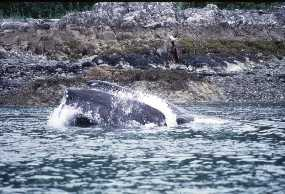
A humpback whale in Glacier Bay

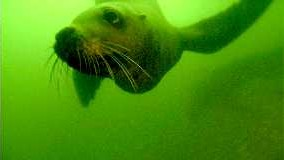
A sea lion underwater in the Glacier Bay

Humpback whales have been sighted in the lower region of Glacier Bay; also in Sitakaday Narrows, Whidbey Passage and the waters around South Marble Island. For kayakers, Hugh Miller Inlet and the Beardslee Islands are good locations to see humpback whales from a safe distance of about a quarter mile. Other marine whales sighted are grey, minke, fin, and killer whales (orcas).

Seals and porpoise

Harbor seals, northern fur seals, sea otters, harbor porpoises, Dall's porpoises and Steller sea lions are also seen in Glacier Bay.

Other fauna

Land mammals sighted in Glacier Bay are: blue bears (glacier), western moose, Sitka deer, mountain goat, Alexander Archipelago wolf, coyote, Canada lynx, wolverine, marmots, land and river otters, weasels, ermine, American mink, squirrels, North American beaver and red fox. Porcupines, voles, shrews, hares, and bats are also found.

Avifauna

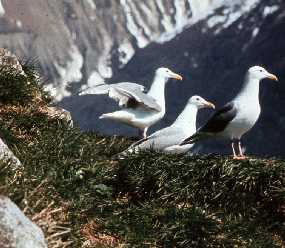
A colony of glaucous-winged gulls in Glacier Bay

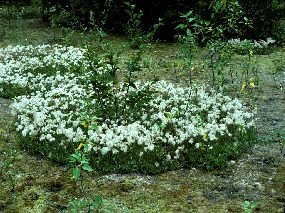
Young cotton wood trees growing out of round mats of nitrogen-fixing Dryas

200 species of birds have been recorded in the Bay. These include: the bald eagle, golden eagle, raven, northern hawk owl, sandhill crane, loon, Steller's jay, murre, cormorant, puffin, murrelet, oystercatchers, herons, geese, ducks, ptarmigan, crow, osprey, blue grouse, woodpecker, pigeon guillemot, sparrow, sandpiper, plover, Arctic tern, kittiwake and gulls.

Fish

Fish species found in the bay are: Chinook, chum, sockeye, pink and coho salmon, halibut, trout, steelhead, Dolly Varden, lingcod, whitefish, blackfish, char and herring. As for shellfish, there are Dungeness crabs, scallops, shrimp and clams. Salmon are very important food of bears, particularly in the late summer and fall. In the southern part of the bay, there are streams which abound in salmon. They are also seen colonizing in the northern bay, consequent to the retreat of many glaciers and the streams emerging. These salmon food sources are expected to support more bear populations in the years ahead.

Vegetation

Plant recolonization and succession has occurred in Glacier Bay as a result of the retreat of the glacier bay in the last about 300 years. The succession, which occurred in the new wilderness of Glacier Bay, started on the raw landscape. The Park is now home to the longest running successional study in the world, started in 1916 by William S. Cooper. A simile given is that "It was like seeing an owl with no feathers". A vegetative wilderness has been created, which has resulted in the coastal forest. 333 Vascular plant species of individual taxa have been recorded in the Glacier Bay. Dense thickets of Sitka alder and devil's club abound along the shoreline.

== Landmarks ==
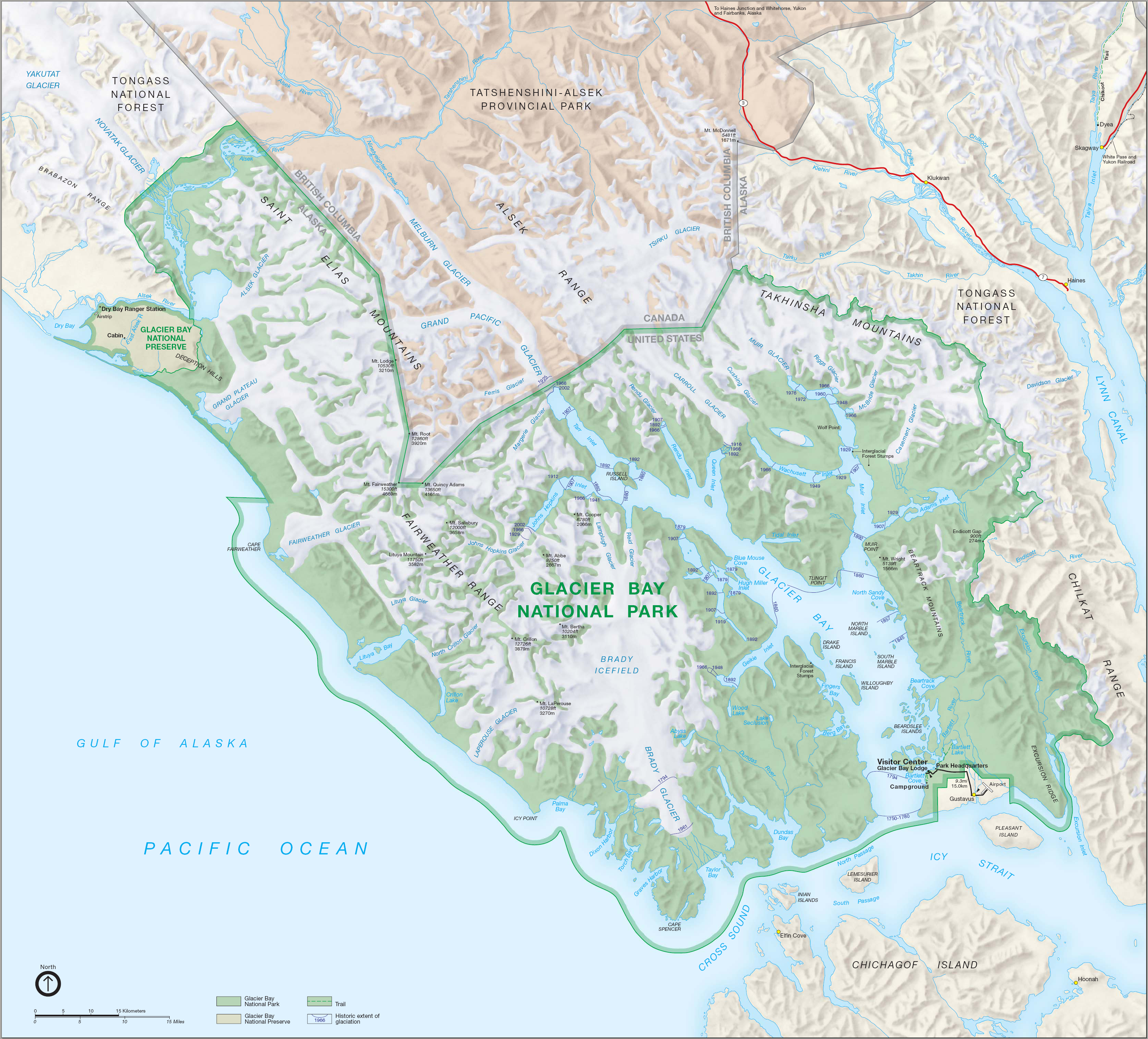
A layout map of the Glacier Bay

There are 50 odd glaciers identified in the Glacier Bay, which are both terrestrial and tidewater type. Some of the major inlets, glaciers and the mountains in the order of their location from the entry have been identified from the National Park Service Map. At the entry to the Bay there are (as read from the map): The small Gustavus town and then the Visitor Center of the National Park Service and the Glacier Bay Lodge followed by several islands within the main channel. On the western side of the channel, the first inlet is the Muir Inlet which has several inlets and glaciers such as Adam's Inlet, Casement Glacier, McBride Glacier, Riggs Glacier, Muir Glacier followed by the Wachusett Inlet. Coming out of the Muir inlet and entering and cruising toward the north along the main Bay, on the west shore are the Gelkie Inlet, Reid Glacier and Lamplugh Glacier fed by Brady Ice field and Brady Glacier, followed by Johns Hopkins Glacier, Margerie Glacier and the Great Pacific Glacier at the head of the Bay. The east shore line has the Queen Inlet with its Carroll Glacier, and the Rendu Inlet with its Rendu Glacier. The Fairweather Range of hills which feeds the Johns Hopkins and Margerie Glaciers form the western boundary of the Glacier Bay and the highest mountains seen here are the Mt. Fairweather (15,300 feet (4,700 m)), Mt. Quincy Adams (13,650 feet (4,160 m)), Mt. Salisbury (12,000 feet (3,700 m)), Mt. Crillon (12,276 feet (3,742 m)), Mt. Bertha (10,204 feet (3,110 m)), Mt. Abbe (8,750 feet (2,670 m)) and Mt. Cooper (6,780 feet (2,070 m)). The major island, opposite to the Johns Hopkins Inlet, is the Russel Island in the midst of the main channel.

=== Muir Glacier ===
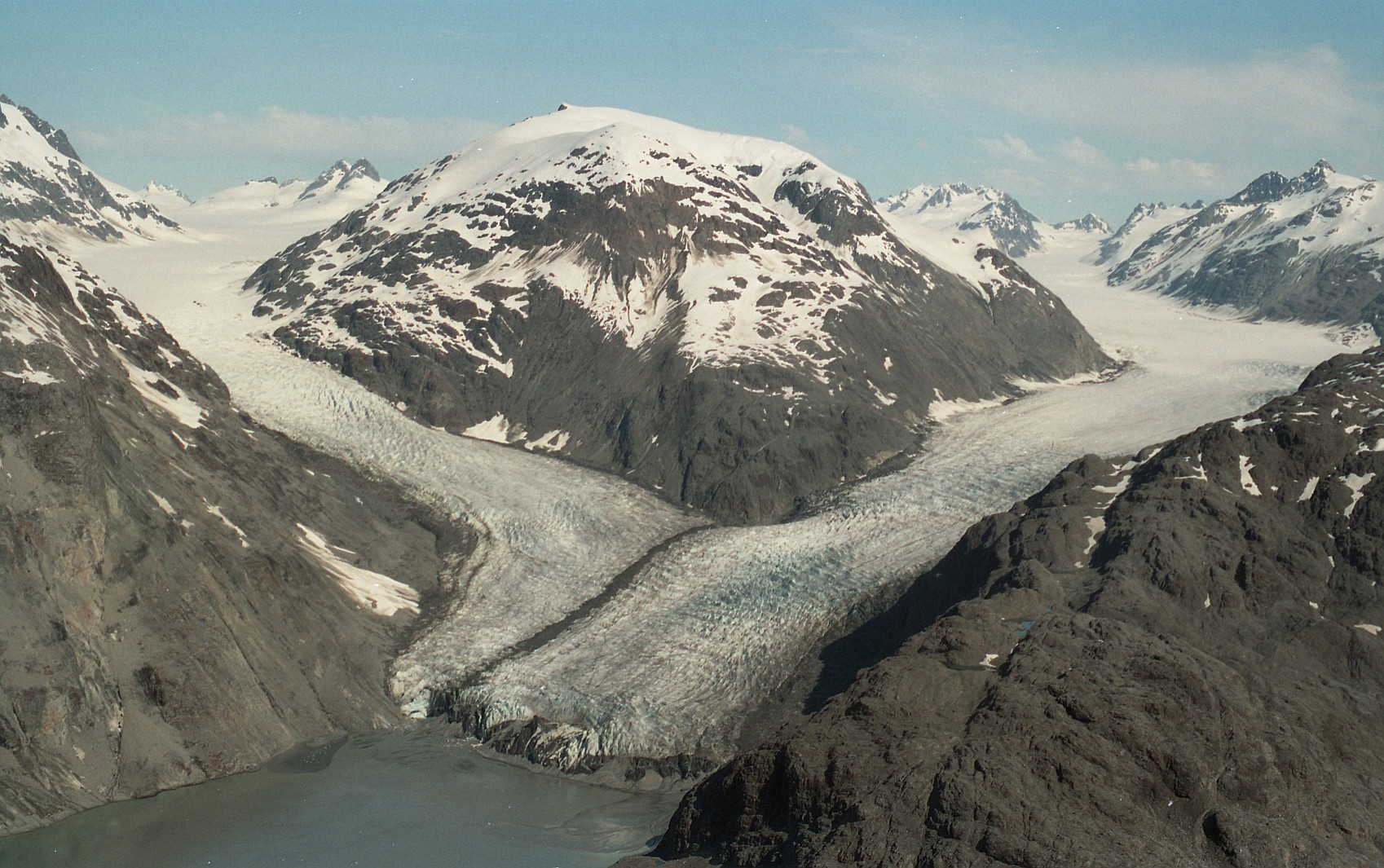
The Muir Glacier in 1994

The Muir Glacier was named after John Muir, the naturalist, who identified it in 1889. The Muir Glacier was once a tide water glacier with a width of 1.5 miles (2.4 km), a length of 2 miles (3.2 km), and a height of 265 feet (80.8 m). It has now turned into terrestrial glacier; it has receded and does not flow into the sea. Its retreat has been very rapid and well-documented since its Little Ice Age maximum position at the mouth of Glacier Bay around 1780. During its retreating stage which began in 1889, calving was intense. The flow was at the rate of about 6,000 feet (1,800 m) per year or about 16 feet (4.9 m) per day until 1979 and as a result the glacier became terrestrial by 1993. The flow was reported to be 0.5 feet (0.15 m) per day between 1999 and 2001. The glacier is now only 0.5 miles (0.80 km) in width, 150 feet (46 m) in height, and extends for 13 miles (21 km). Morse Glacier is its tributary and is also retreating faster than the Muir. Further, during this process of retreat, glacial till left behind two large deltas extending to a width of about 1,400 feet (430 m) at the water edge during low tide.

=== Reid Glacier ===
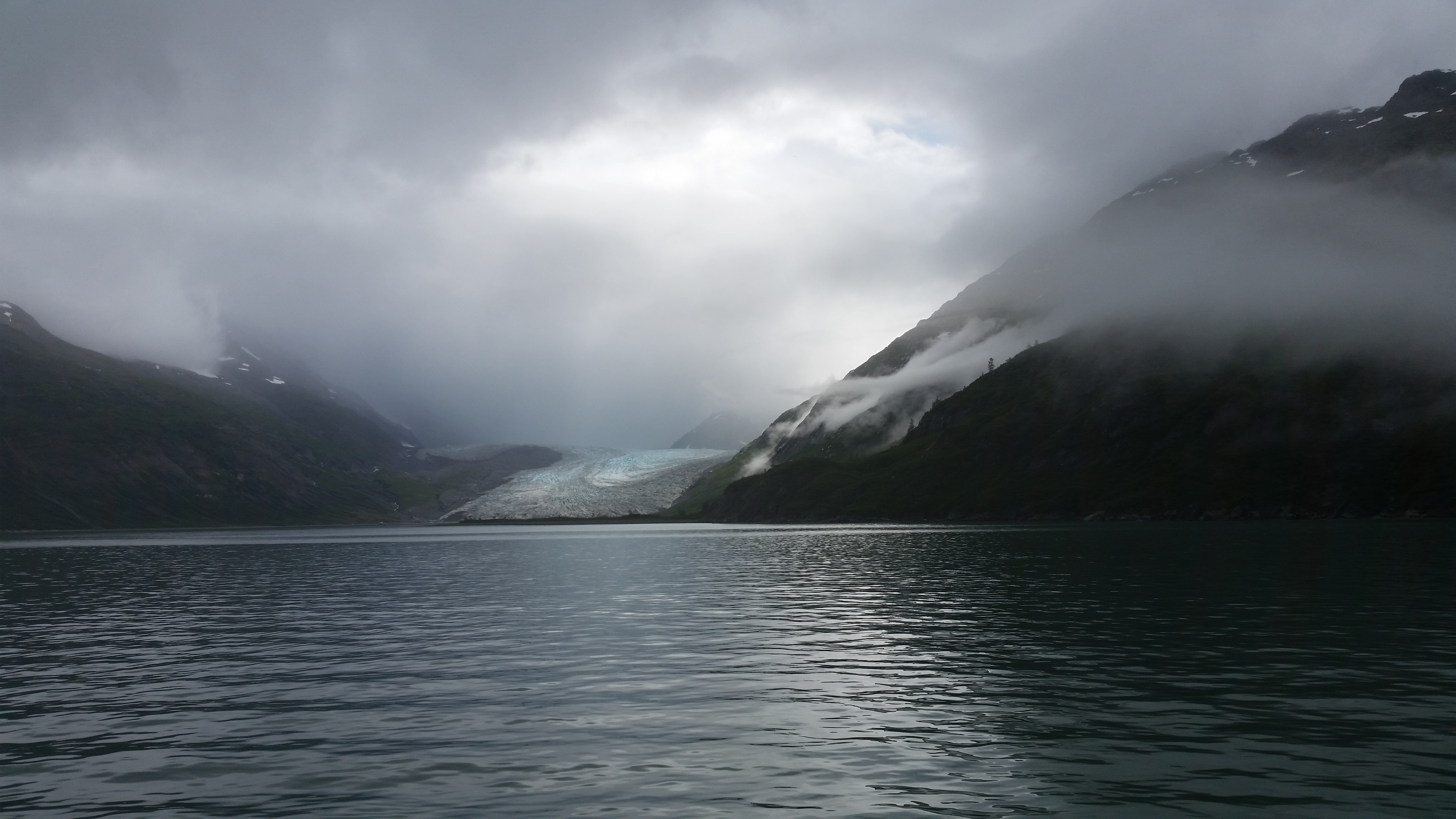
Reid Glacier in August 2016

The Reid Glacier was named by the members of the Harriman Alaska Expedition for Harry Fielding Reid (1859–1944), professor of geology at Johns Hopkins University, who was well known for his studies of glacier flow and stratification in Alaska and the Alps. The glacier has its origin in Brady Icefield and has a flow rate of 15 feet (4.6 m) per day. At the water edge, its width is 0.75 miles (1.21 km), rises to a height of 150 feet (46 m) and stretches to a length of 10 miles (16 km) and flows into Bigourdan Fjord. In view of fast rate of retreat, this glacier has turned from tide water to terrestrial glacier, particularly on its eastern and western one third widths. Sediment deposits from the glacier have gradually filled the eastern and western margins at its inlet, as seen during low tides. The central one third of the glacier, however, touches water edge with a recorded depth of 30 feet (9.1 m) of water, during high tide. The walls of the fjord of the glacier, however, also show marks of lateral deposits of the glaciers right up to rock faces.

=== Lamplugh Glacier ===
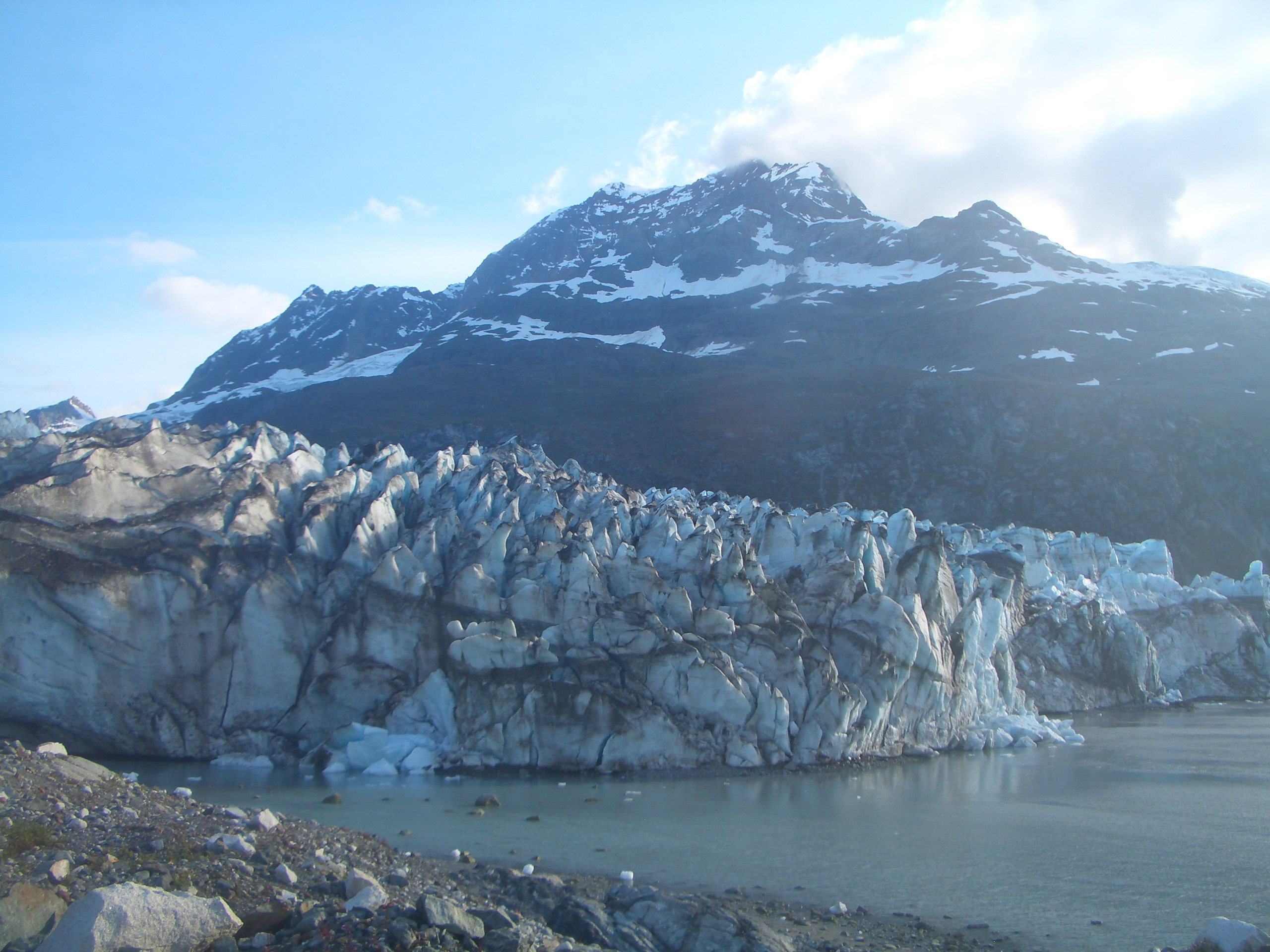
Close view of Lamplugh Glacier.

The Lamplugh Glacier was named by Lawrence Martin of the U.S. Geological Survey (USGS) around 1912 for the English geologist George William Lamplugh (1859–1926), who visited the Glacier Bay in 1884. The Glacier originates in the Brady Icefield to the east of Fairweather Range. The glacier has a width of about 0.75 miles (1.21 km) at the water face. Its rises to height of 150–160 feet (46–49 m) with depth of 10–40 feet (3.0–12.2 m) at the waterline. It stretches to over 16 miles (26 km). The ice flow rate from the glacier is estimated at 900–1,000 feet (270–300 m) per year and is noted to be receding in the central and eastern part of the ice face due to calving; the western part is, however, seen mostly grounded except during the high tide range. In the central part, a subglacial stream has developed which is seen to shift its position laterally. This phenomenon is attributed to the deposition of fluvial sediment in the embayment. It forms a delta, as observed during low tide. It also results in water turning from brown to tan milky.

=== Johns Hopkins Inlet ===
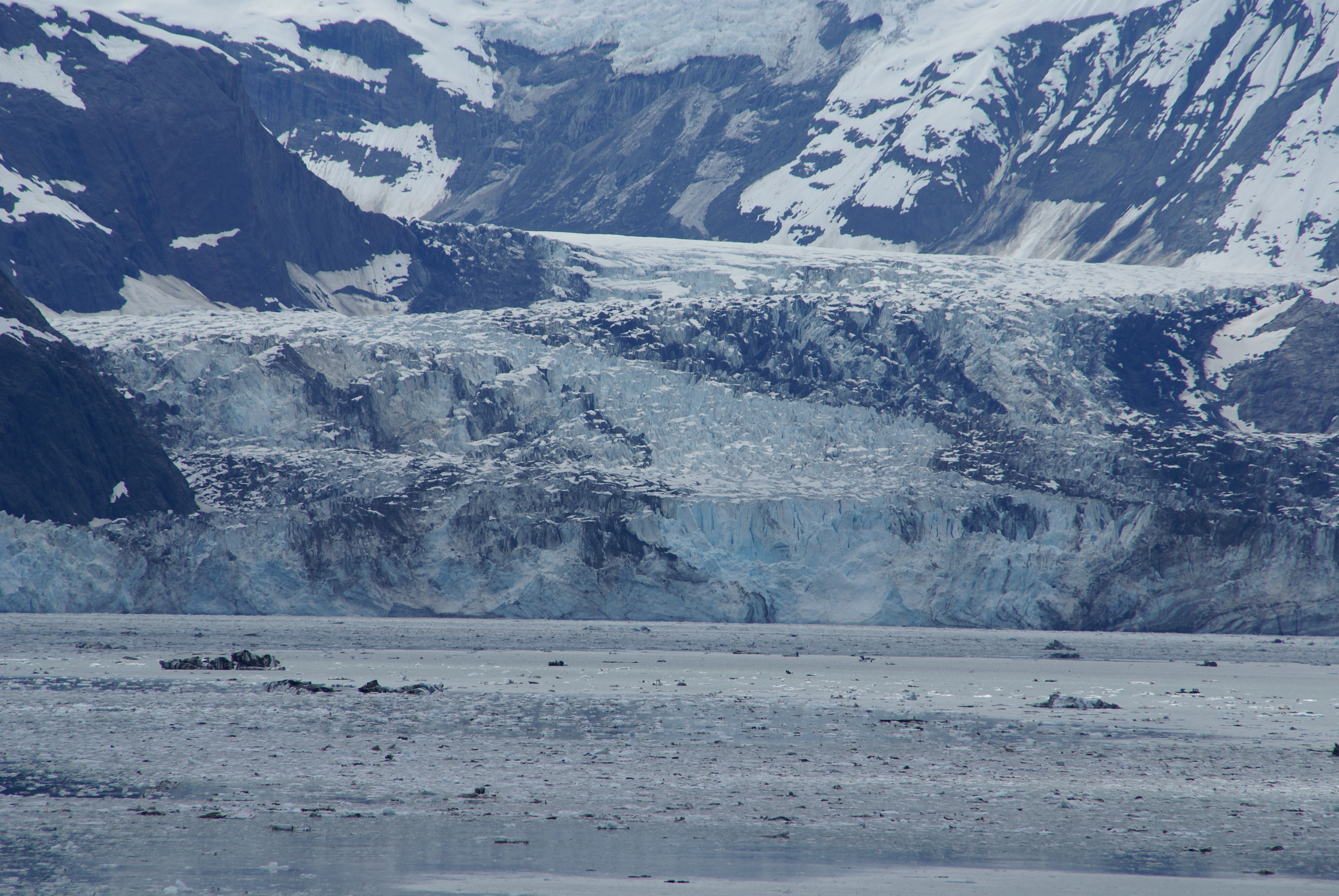
Johns Hopkins Glacier

The Johns Hopkins Inlet is a stunning 9-mile (14 km) long fjord, which has several tide water glaciers. The Lamplugh Glacier is about 1.5 miles (2.4 km) away from the inlet and further inside is the Johns Hopkins Glacier, which is now the largest tidewater glacier in Glacier Bay and adjacent to it is the Gilman Glacier followed by the Hoonah Glacier further up. All these glaciers are tidewater glaciers. Ice blocks float in the inlet and it is quite hazardous for boating or kayaking; both activities have to be done with great caution. Johns Hopkins Inlet is closed to boats in May and June in order to protect unweaned harbor seal pups.

=== Johns Hopkins Glacier ===
The Johns Hopkins Glacier rises from the Fairweather Range on the east slopes of Lituya Mountain and Mount Salisbury and has an easterly flow towards the head of Johns Hopkins Inlet, 1 mile (1.6 km) southwest of the terminus of Clark Glacier and 79 miles (127 km) northwest of Hoonah. Its rock, ice and snow depict a variety of impressive colors such as grey, blue and white. It was named in 1893 by H.F. Reid after the Johns Hopkins University in Baltimore, Maryland, which sponsored an expedition to this glacier. It is the only advancing tidewater glacier now (its advance started in 1924 when Grand Pacific Glacier started receding towards Tarr Inlet) and is combined with Gilman Glacier (first got attached to Hopkins in the 1990s, broke off and rejoined several times and once again it appears joined since 2000); both are advancing as one single ice block, and at the waterfront, has a width of 1 mile (1.6 km) with a depth of 250 feet (76 m), rises to a height of 250 feet (76 m) and stretches to about 12 miles (19 km) upstream. Submarine calving has also been recorded.

The Johns Hopkins Glacier, for example, cannot be approached any nearer than about 2 miles (3.2 km) by sea because of the volume of the ice blocks that break loose from its cliffs. Most visitors to the park come by cruise ship and thus view the glaciers from the water.

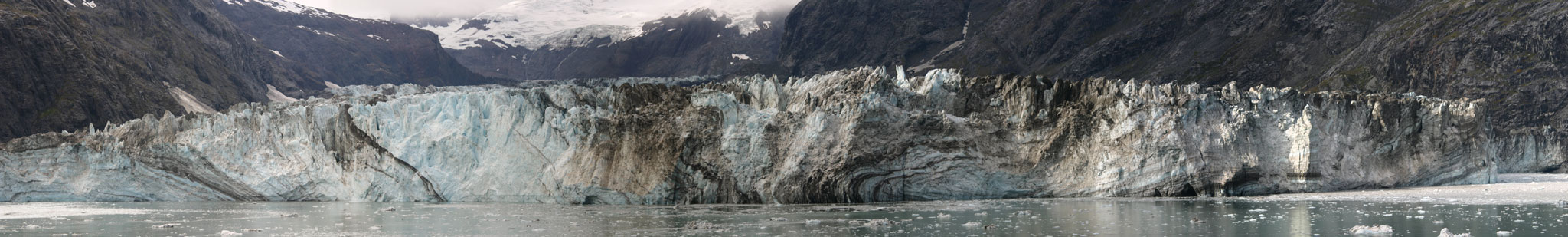
Snout of Johns Hopkins Glacier.

=== Gilman Glacier ===
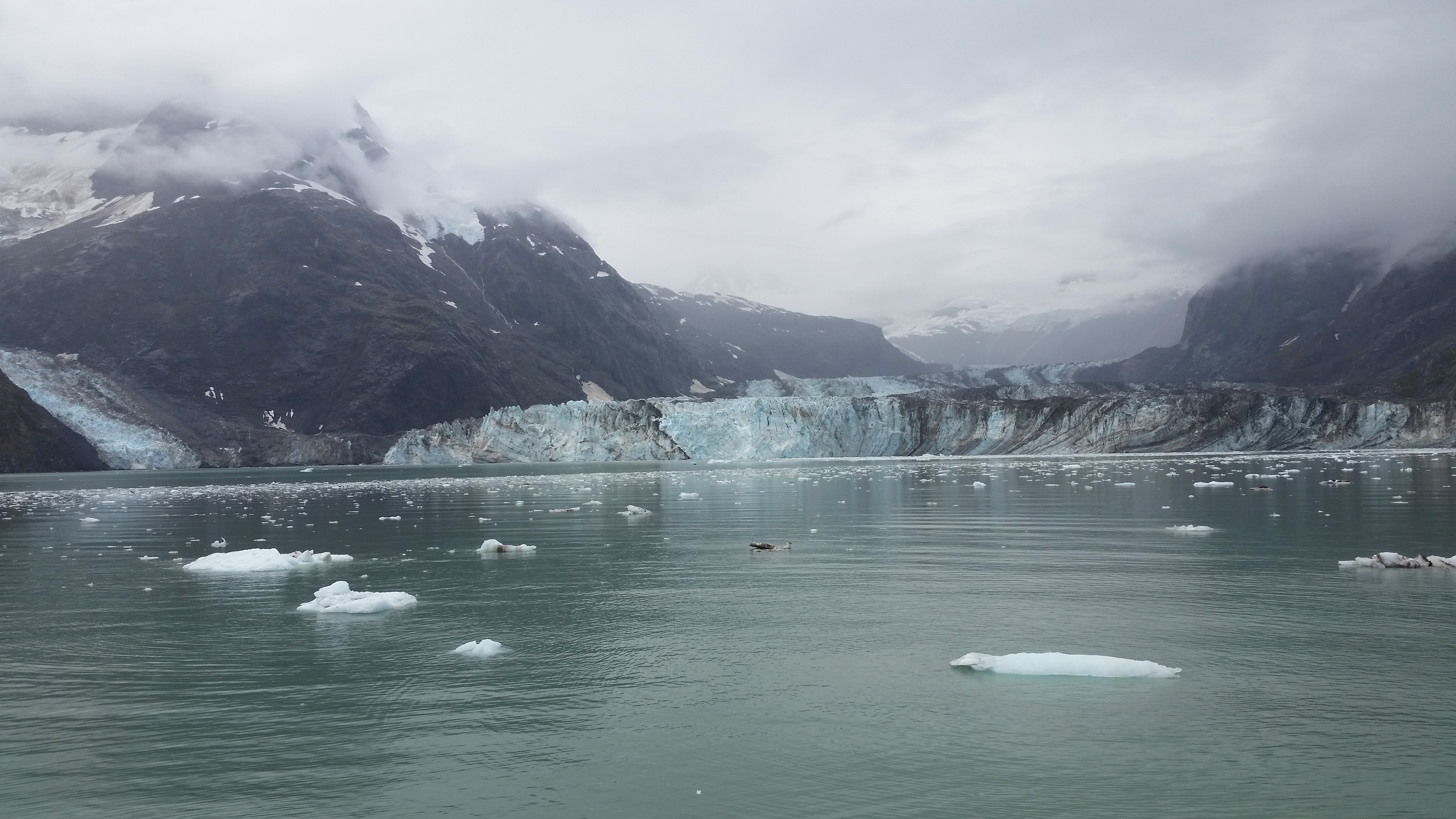
Gilman and Johns Hopkins Glaciers in August 2016

Gilman Glacier got attached to Johns Hopkins Glacier sometime in 1990. In the following decade, the two glaciers merged and de-merged several times. However, in 2000 it was again attached to Johns Hopkins glacier and the two together are stated to be advancing along the 150-to-200-foot (46 to 61 m) steep ice face.

=== Tarr Inlet ===
The Tarr Inlet at the head of the Glacier Bay is a scene of ice and snow, and "sits cater-corner to Johns Hopkins Inlet". This inlet provides excellent views of the Grand Pacific Glacier to its north and the Margerie Glacier to its west. The west shore line of this inlet is steep and rocky, extends to 4 miles (6.4 km) up to a small stream where a beach has been formed. A further 3 miles (4.8 km) along the channel, a glacier knob is seen in the center of the west shore of the inlet. A cove formation here provides for good camping grounds, where strong winds and ice flows are experienced. This location also provides a panoramic view of the Tarr Inlet. Two miles north of this location is the Margerie Glacier. Grand Pacific Glacier is located to the east side of the Margerie Glacier at the head of the Tarr Inlet where extensive gravel outwash is seen. From Grand Pacific, the Tarr Inlet continues for 5 miles (8.0 km) with steep gravel shore line interspersed with minor streams separated by gravel outwash.

=== Margerie Glacier ===
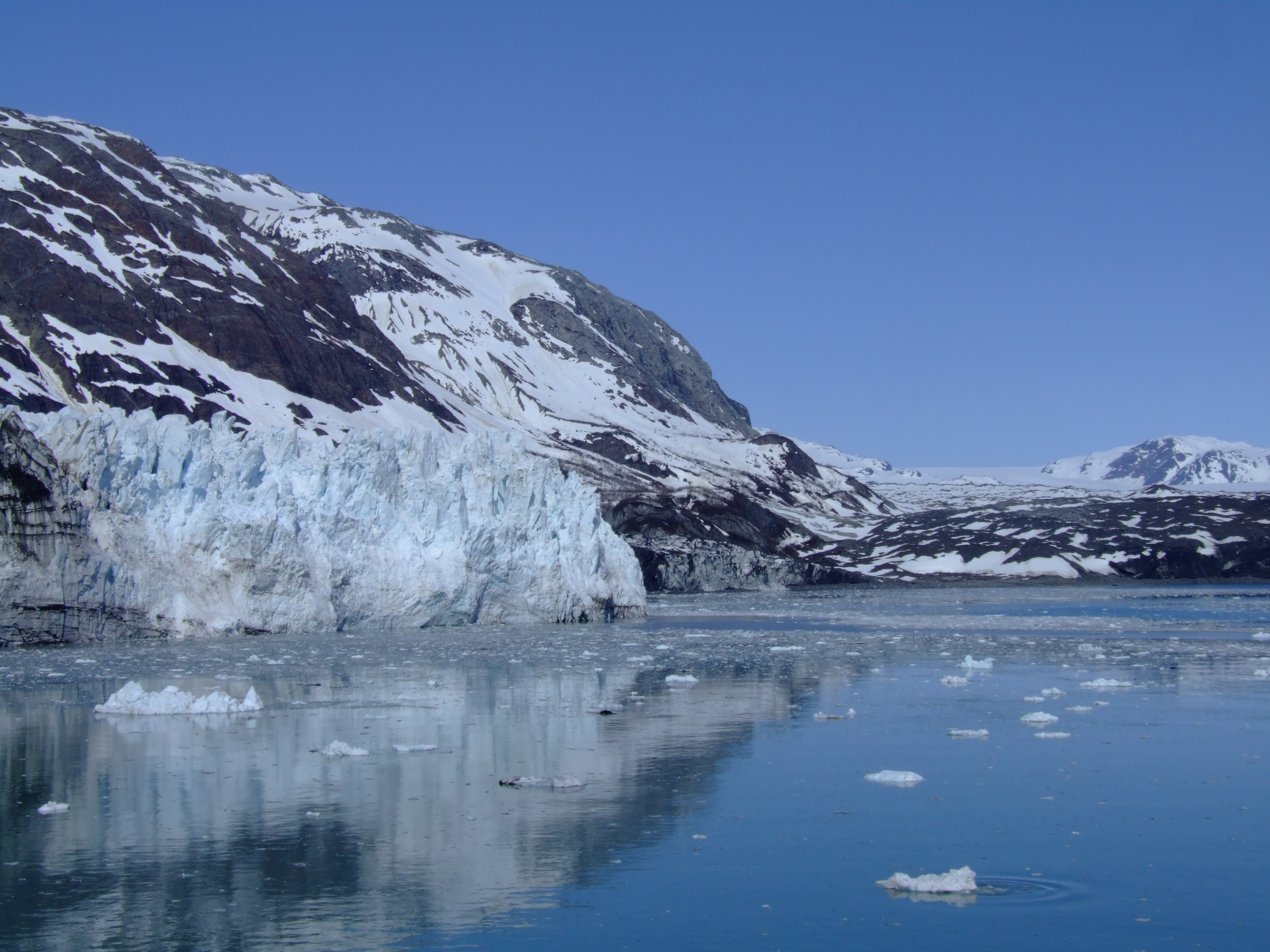
Upper end of Tarr Inlet, with Margerie Glacier on left foreground and Grand Pacific Glacier on right background

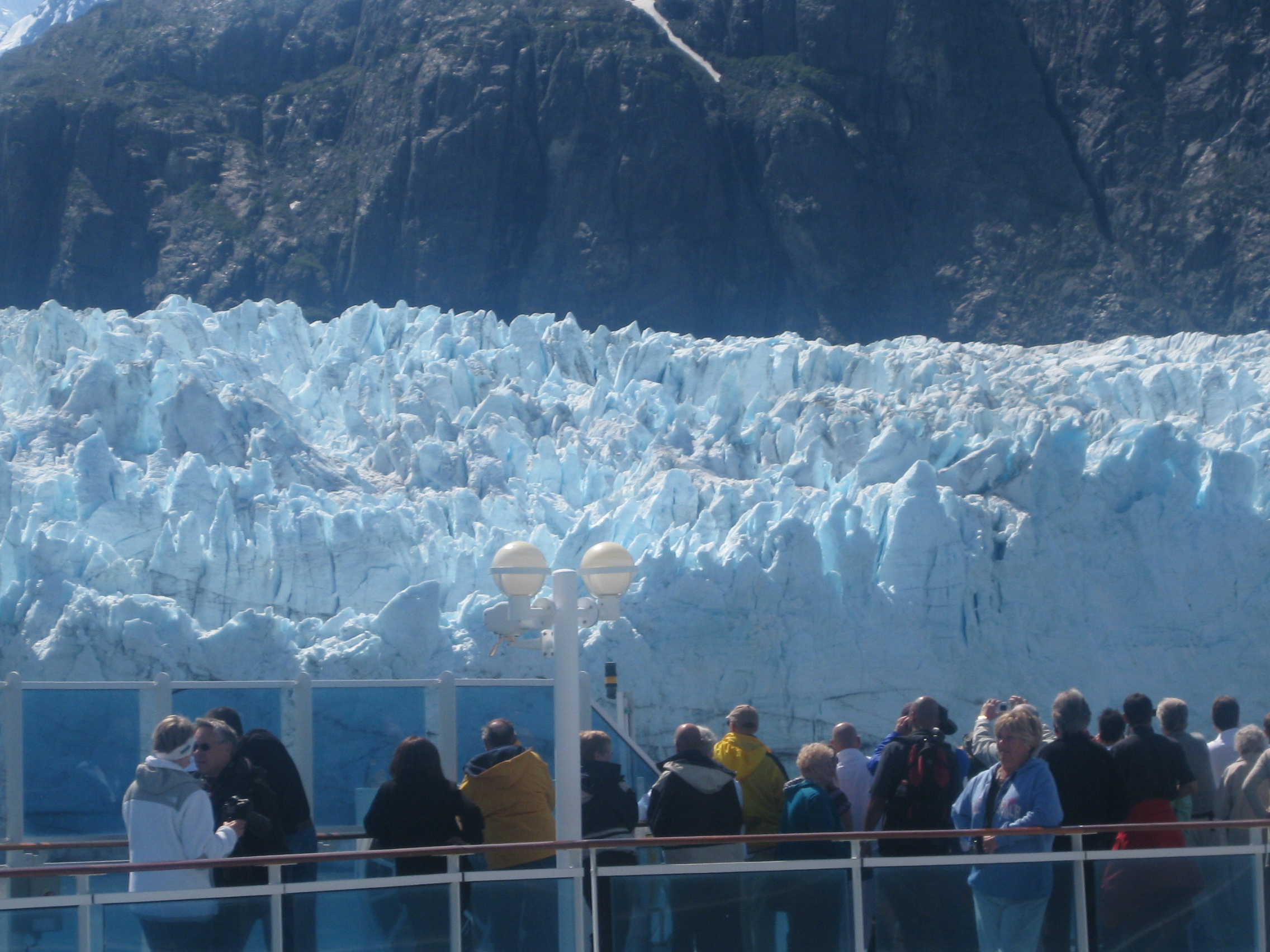
Close view of Margerie Glacier

The Margerie Glacier is a 21 miles (34 km) long tide water glacier that begins on the south slope of Mount Root, at the Alaska-Canada border in the Fairweather Range (elevation above 9,000 feet (2,700 m)), and flows southeast and northeast to Tarr Inlet, one mile (1.6 km) north of the terminus of Grand Pacific Glacier and 87 miles (140 km) northwest of Hoonah. It was named for famed French geographer and geologist Emmanuel de Margerie (1862–1953), who visited Glacier Bay in 1913. Located at the deep end of the Glacier Bay, Margerie Glacier extends over a width of about 1 mile (1.6 km) and extends upstream for a length of 21 miles (34 km) till its source on the southern slopes of the hill of Mount Root, at the Alaska-Canada border. Mount Root (elevation 12,860 feet (3,920 m)), named Boundary Peak 165, is a mountain in Alaska and British Columbia, is part of the Fairweather Range of the Saint Elias Mountains.

=== Grand Pacific Glacier ===
The Grand Pacific Glacier, at the head of the Tarr Inlet on the north, has a streaked face covered with gravel and stones (more than 3 feet (0.91 m)) thick in many areas). Landslides and medial moraines cover much of eastern side of the glacier extending to about two-thirds width of the ice face. It is not an active glacier. In the earlier 18th century, it was a one single block of ice at the Gulf of Alaska, when Captain Vancouver first saw it, which has receded to the present location that is 65 miles (105 km)) from the Glacier Bay inlet. At the present site, Grand Pacific Glacier has a width of 2 miles (3.2 km)) with a water depth of 30 feet (9.1 m)) and with an average height of 150 feet (46 m)) and stretches to 35 miles (56 km)). It calves into the Tarr Inlet and its western two thirds part is formed by the tributary Ferris Glacier. Its flow rate is reported to be about 1,500 feet (460 m)) per year or about 4 feet (1.2 m)) per day. However, the eastern part of the Glacier is reportedly moving at the rate of about 15–180 feet (4.6–54.9 m)) per year. Margerie Glacier had merged with this glacier in 1992. As the glacier started receding it got demerged from Margerie and only a small stream separates the two glaciers now.

=== Fairweather Range ===
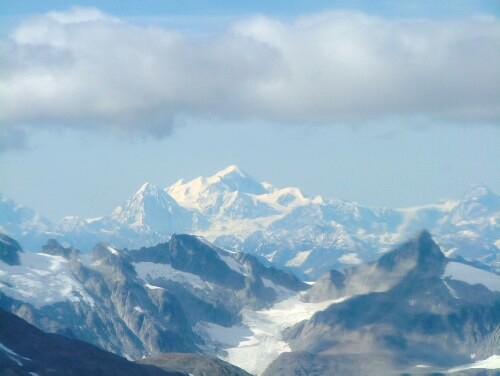
The Fairweather Range

The Fairweather Range is the unofficial name for a mountain range located in the U.S. state of Alaska and the Canadian province of British Columbia. It is the southernmost range of the Saint Elias Mountains. The northernmost section of the range is situated in Tatshenshini-Alsek Provincial Park while the southernmost section resides in Glacier Bay National Park in the Hoonah-Angoon Census Area. In between, it goes through the southeastern corner of Yakutat Borough. Peaks of this range include Mount Fairweather, the highest point in British Columbia and Mount Quincy Adams 4,150 meters (13,620 ft).

Between the bay and the coast, snow-clad peaks of the Fairweather Range capture the moisture coming in off the Gulf of Alaska and, in turn, spawn the park's largest glaciers. Mt. Fairweather is the tallest peak in the Fairweather Range and is very much unlike its name as it has a very harsh terrain.

Mt. Fairweather

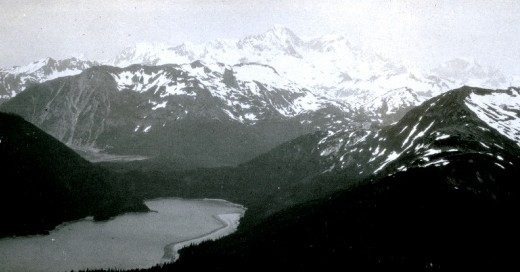
Mt. Fairweather at the center

The Mt. Fairweather (officially gazetted as Fairweather Mountain in Canada but referred to as Mount Fairweather), is located 20 kilometers (12 mi) east of the Pacific Ocean in the Glacier Bay region. While most of the mountain lies within the City and Borough of Yakutat, the summit is also in Tatshenshini-Alsek Provincial Park, British Columbia (Canada), making it the highest point in that province. It is also designated as Boundary Peak 164 or as US/Canada Boundary Point #164. The mountain was named on May 3, 1778, by Captain James Cook, apparently for the unusually good weather encountered at the time. The name has been variously translated. It was called "Mt. Beautemps" by La Perouse (1786, atlas), "Mte. Buen-tiempo" by Galiano (1802, map 3), "Gor[a]-Khoroshy-pogody" on Russian Hydrographic Service Chart 1378 in 1847, and "G[ora] Fayerveder" by Captain Tebenkov (1852, map 7), Imperial Russian Navy. It was called "Schonwetterberg" by Constantin Grewink in 1850 and "Schonwetter Berg" by Justus Perthes in 1882. Mt. Fairweather was first climbed in 1931 by Allen Carpé and Terris Moore.
