= Fifty Years of Alaskan Statehood =

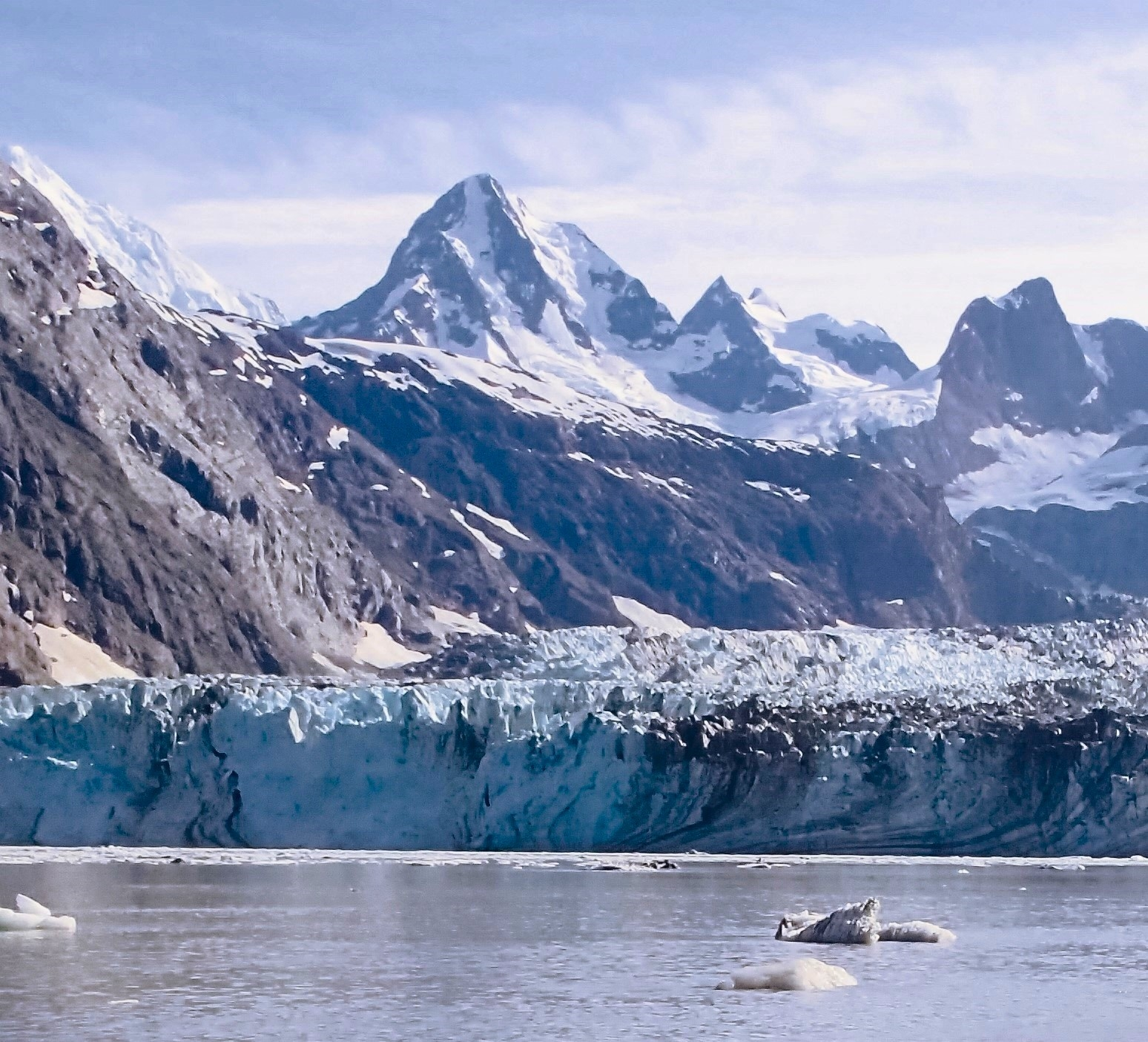
- North-northeast aspect

Highest point
- Elevation: 8,599 ft (2,621 m)
- Prominence: 1,399 ft (426 m)
- Isolation: 1.84 mi (2.96 km)
- Coordinates: 58°43′41″N 137°10′48″W

Geography
- Location within Alaska
- Interactive map of Fifty Years of Alaskan Statehood
- Country: United States
- State: Alaska
- Census Area: Hoonah–Angoon
- Protected area: Glacier Bay National Park
- Parent range: Saint Elias Mountains; Fairweather Range
- Topo map: USGS Mount Fairweather C-4

Climbing
- First ascent: 2009

Fifty Years of Alaskan Statehood is an 8,599-foot (2,621 m) mountain summit in the US state of Alaska.

== Description ==
Fifty Years of Alaskan Statehood is located in the Fairweather Range of the Saint Elias Mountains. It is set within Glacier Bay National Park and Preserve and is situated six miles (9.7 km) northwest of Mount Bertha. Precipitation runoff from the mountain drains to Johns Hopkins Inlet where cruise ships allow views of the peak and the Johns Hopkins Glacier. Although modest in elevation, topographic relief is significant as the summit rises up from tidewater in seven miles (11 km) and the north face rises 6,100 feet (1,860 m) in 1.5 mi (2.4 km). The first ascent of the summit was made on May 2, 2009, by Paul Knott and Guy McKinnon, who also named this peak. The mountain's toponym has not been officially adopted by the U.S. Board on Geographic Names, and it will remain unofficial as long as the USGS policy of not adopting new toponyms in designated wilderness areas remains in effect.

== Climate ==
Based on the Köppen climate classification, Fifty Years of Alaskan Statehood is located in a tundra climate zone, with long, cold, snowy winters, and cool summers. Weather systems coming off the Gulf of Alaska are forced upwards by the Saint Elias Mountains (orographic lift), causing heavy precipitation in the form of rainfall and snowfall. Winter temperatures can drop below 0 °F with wind chill factors below −10 °F. The months May through June offer the most favorable weather for viewing or climbing the peak.

== Gallery ==
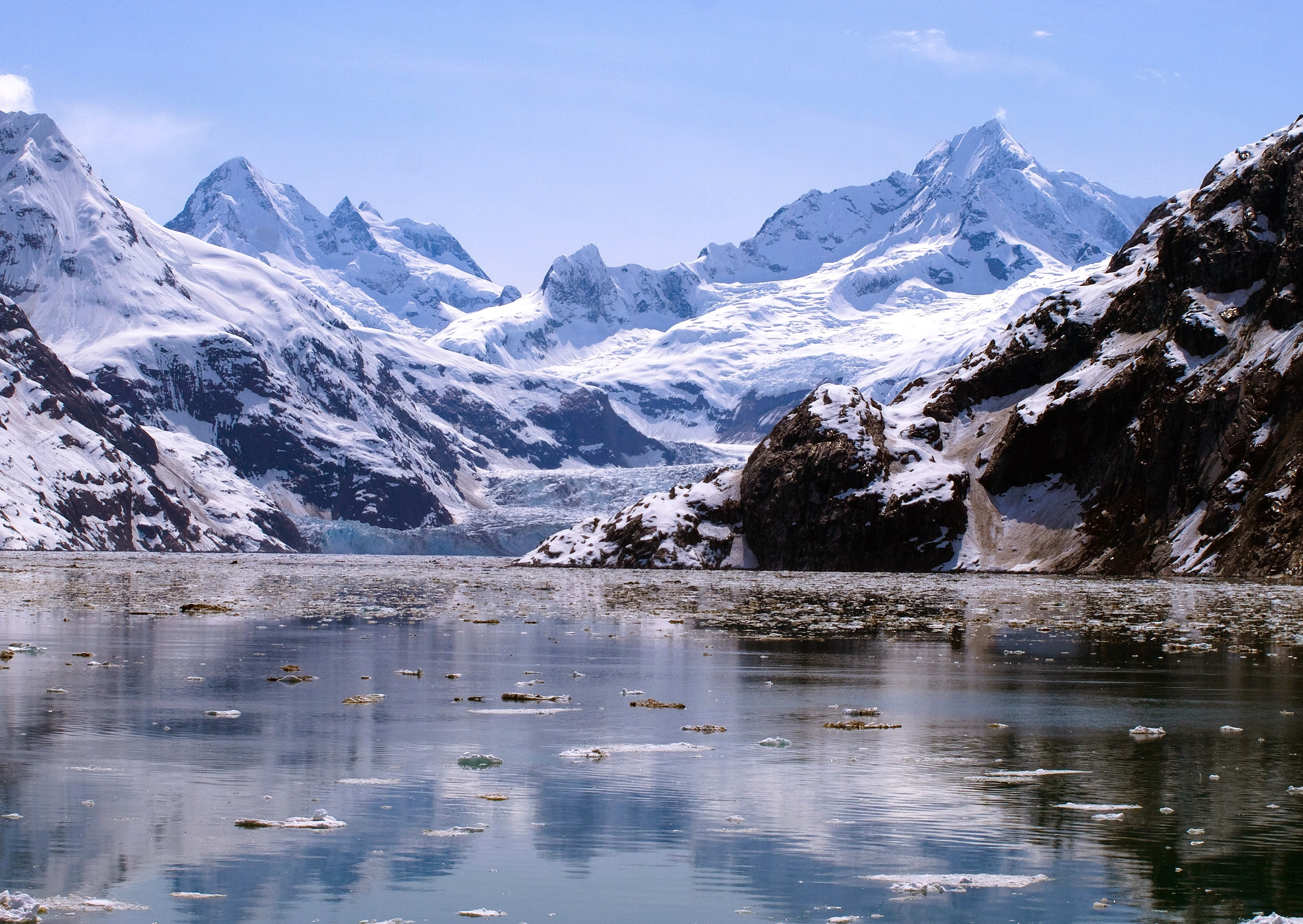
Fifty Years of Alaskan Statehood (left) and Mount Orville (right) viewed from Johns Hopkins Inlet

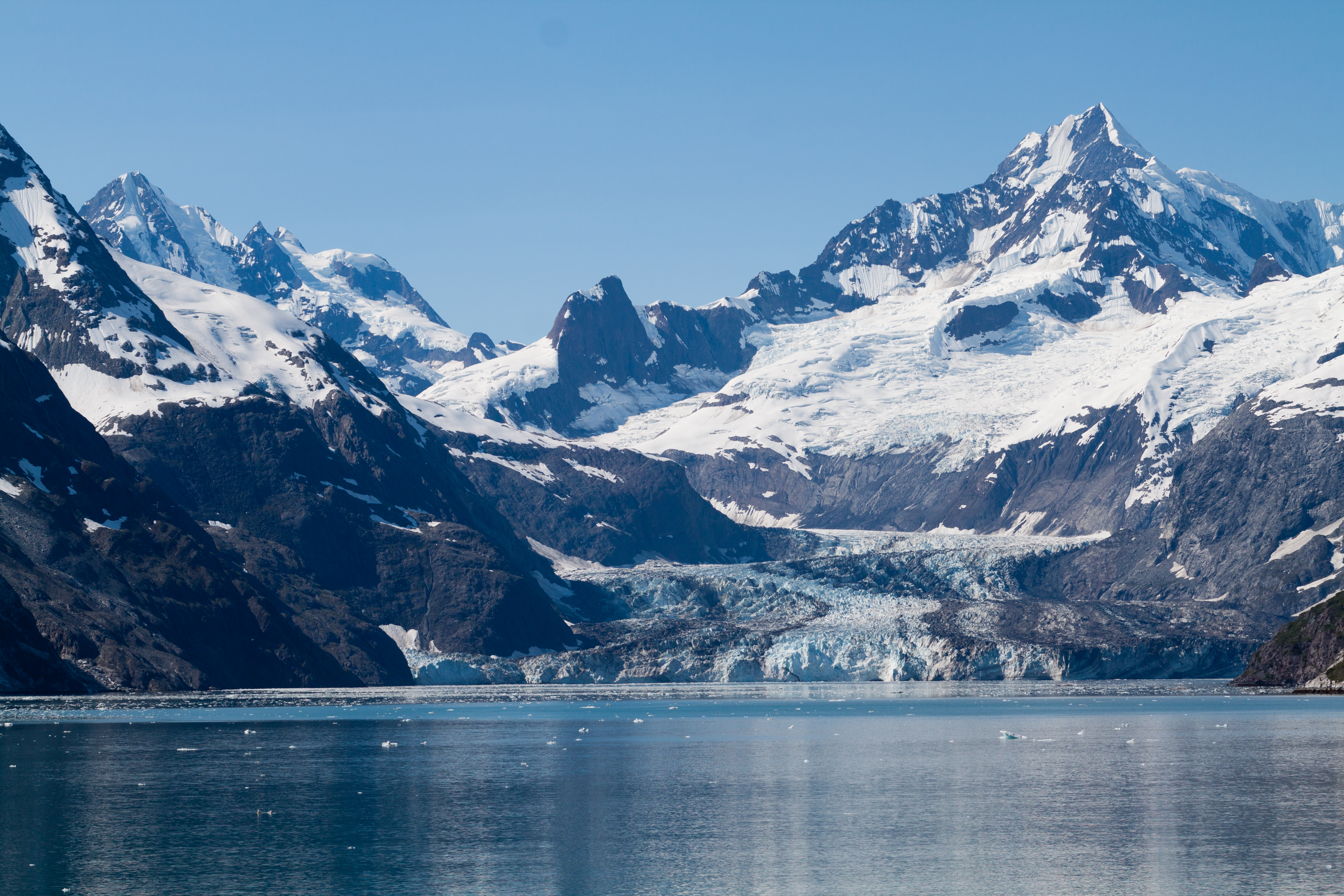
Fifty Years of Alaskan Statehood (left) and Mount Orville (right) from Johns Hopkins Inlet

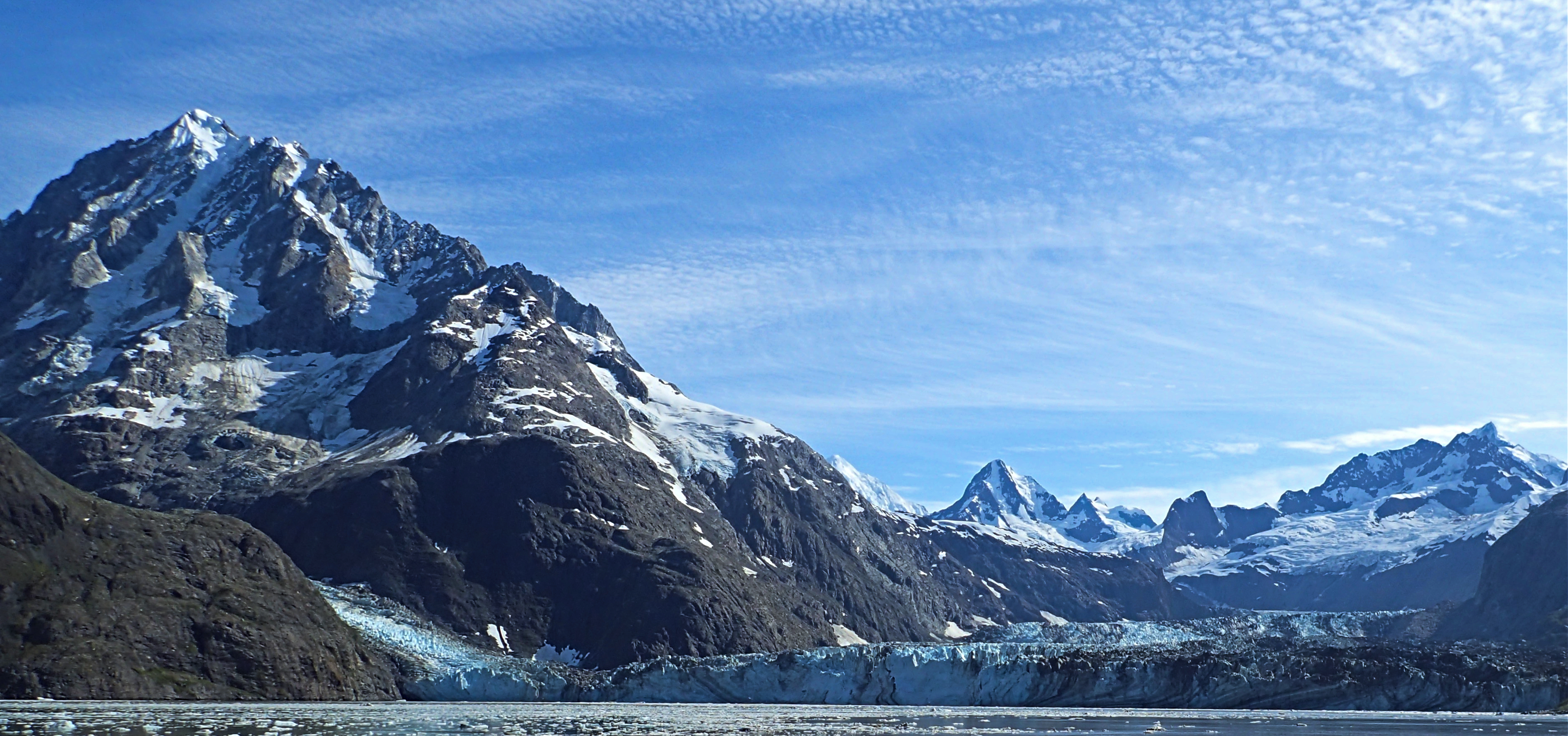
Mt. Abbe (left), Fifty Years of Alaskan Statehood (center), and Mt. Orville (right)

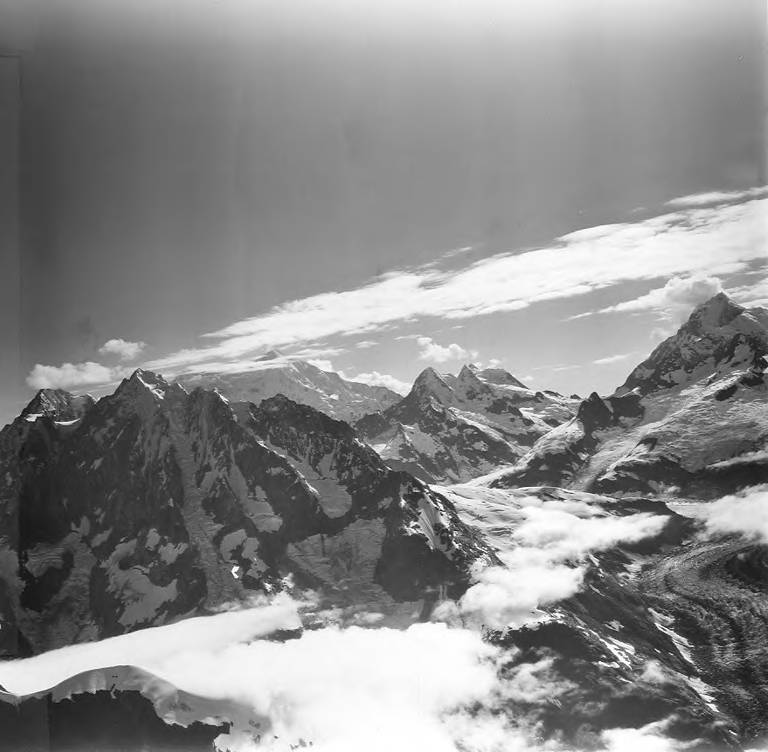
Mt. Abbe (left), Fifty Years of Alaskan Statehood (center), and Mt. Orville (right)

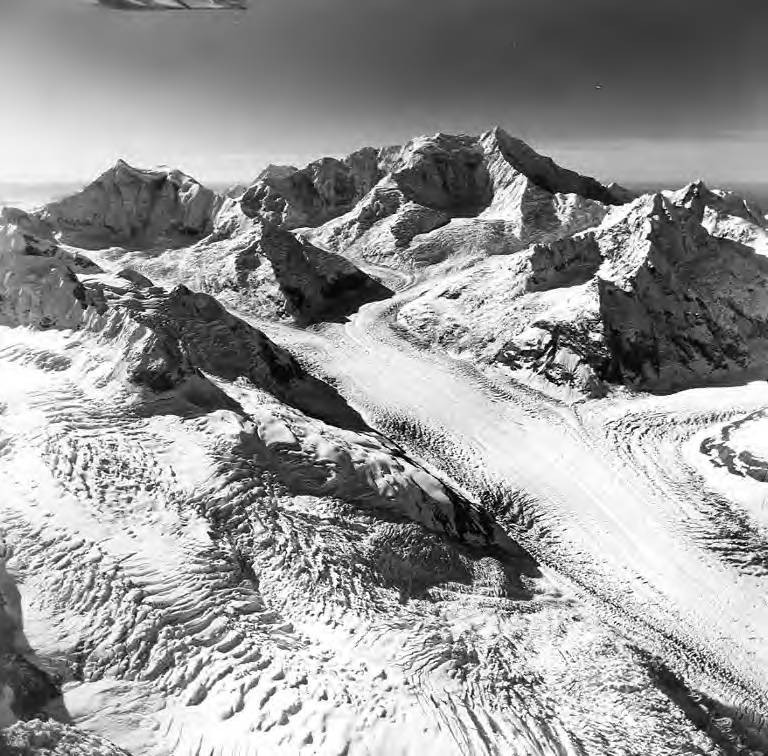
Mt. Bertha (upper left), Mt. Crillon (top), Fifty Years of Alaskan Statehood (right)

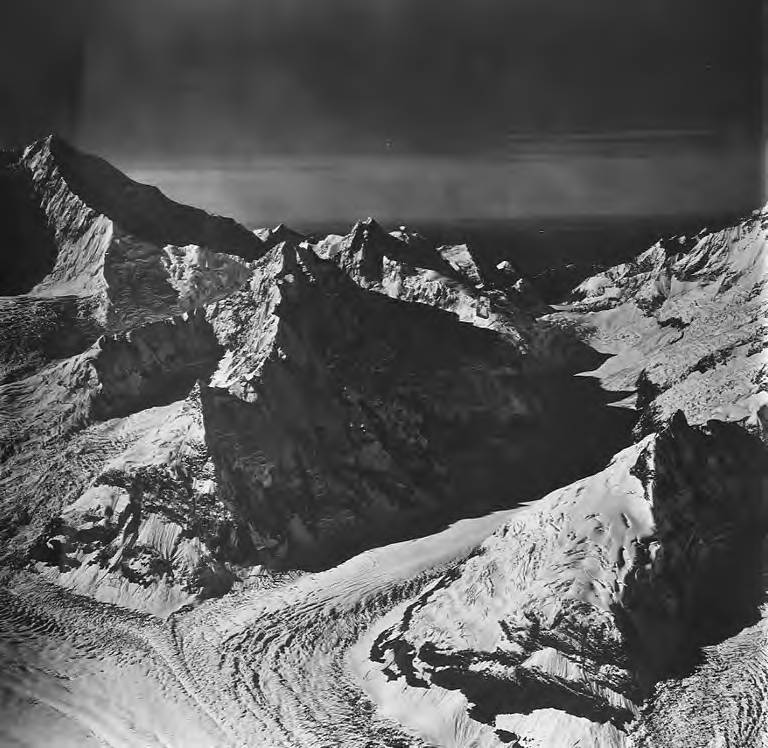
Fifty Years of Alaskan Statehood (left of center) and Mt. Crillon (upper left)

== See also ==
- Geography of Alaska
