= Lester A. Beardslee =

US Navy rear admiral (1836–1901)

Lester Anthony Beardslee
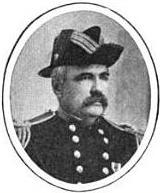
- Born: February 1, 1836; Little Falls, New York, U.S.
- Died: November 10, 1903 (aged 67)
- Education: U.S. Naval Academy
- Military career
- Allegiance: United States
- Branch: United States Navy
- Service years: 1850 - 1898
- Rank: Rear admiral
- Commands: Pacific Squadron

Lester Anthony Beardslee (February 1, 1836 – November 10, 1903) was an officer in the United States Navy who served as the commander of the Department of Alaska and of USS Jamestown from June 14, 1879, to September 12, 1880.

== Life ==
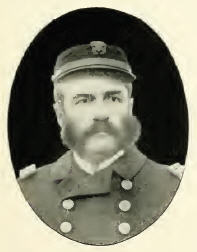
Lester Beardslee in Civil War

Beardslee was born in Little Falls, New York.

He was appointed acting midshipman in March 1850. While serving aboard USS Plymouth, he participated in the Perry Expedition, joining Commodore Matthew C. Perry during his landing at Kurihama, Japan in July 1853. He graduated from the United States Naval Academy in 1856.

After promotion to lieutenant commander in July 1862, Beardslee served as executive officer of USS Nantucket. In October 1863, he was transferred to USS Wachusett, later participating in the capture of CSS Florida.

From 1870 to 1871, he commanded USS Palos, his ship becoming the first US Navy ship to sail through the recently completed Suez Canal. While serving as the commander of the Department of Alaska, he explored Alaska's waters. He gave Glacier Bay, which is the focus of Glacier Bay National Park and Preserve today, its distinctive name in 1880. He also named Spuhn island in Gastineau Channel.

After relinquishing his command in Alaska, he was promoted to captain in November 1880 and to commodore in January 1894. His final post was as Commander of the Pacific Squadron from 1894 to 1897. He kept his flag on USS Philadelphia and was instrumental in choosing Port Angeles Harbor as a location for naval practice.

Beardslee was promoted to rear admiral in May 1895. He retired in February 1898. He died on November 10, 1903.
