= Reid Glacier =

Glacier in Alaska, United States

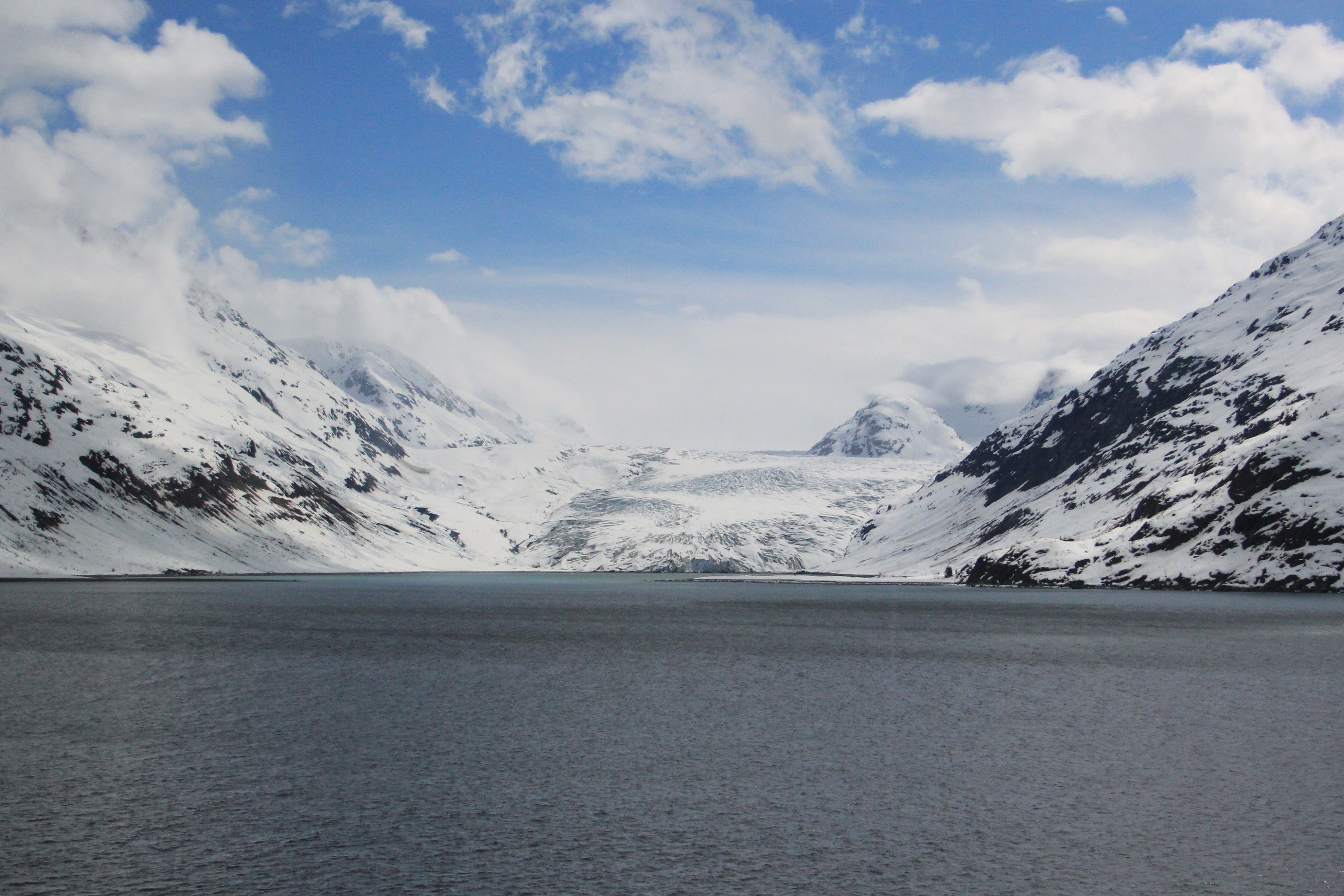
- Reid Glacier

- Location within Alaska
- Interactive map of Reid Glacier
- Type: Mountain glacier
- Location: Hoonah-Angoon Census Area, Alaska, U.S.
- Coordinates: 58°46′27″N 136°48′23″W
- Length: 11-mile (18 km)
- Terminus: sea level
- Status: retreating

Reid Glacier is an 11-mile-long (18-kilometer) glacier in the U.S. state of Alaska. It trends north to Reid Inlet in Glacier Bay National Park and Preserve, two miles (3.2 km) south of Glacier Bay and 72 miles (116 km) northwest of Hoonah. It was named by members of the Harriman Alaska Expedition for Harry Fielding Reid.

== See also ==
- List of glaciers
