= Johns Hopkins Glacier =

Glacier in Alaska, United States

Johns Hopkins
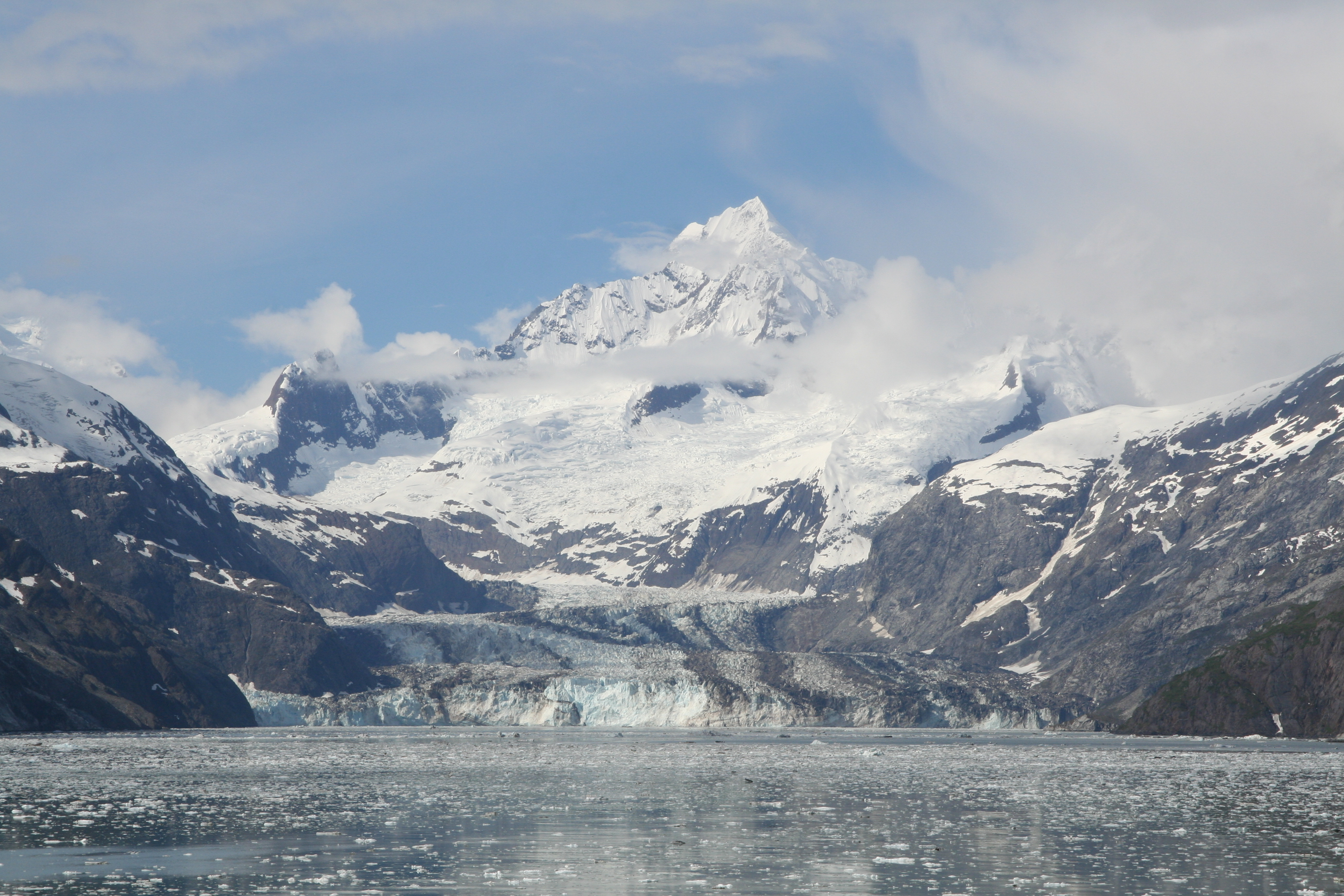
- Johns Hopkins Glacier with Mount Orville and Mount Wilbur in the background

- Location within Alaska
- Interactive map of Johns Hopkins
- Type: Tidewater
- Location: Glacier Bay National Park and Preserve, Alaska, United States
- Coordinates: 58°48′24″N 137°15′01″W
- Length: 12-mile (19 km)
- Terminus: Johns Hopkins Inlet

Johns Hopkins Glacier (Lingít: Tsalxaan Niyaadé Sít’) is a 12-mile (19 km) long glacier located in Glacier Bay National Park and Preserve in the U.S. state of Alaska. It was named after Johns Hopkins University in Baltimore, Maryland in 1893 by Harry Fielding Reid. It is one of the few advancing tidewater glaciers of the Fairweather Range.

== Geography ==
The glacier begins on the east slopes of Lituya Mountain and Mount Salisbury, and trends east to the head of Johns Hopkins Inlet, 1 mile (1.6 km) southwest of the terminus of Clark Glacier on Mount Abbe, and 79 miles (127 km) northwest of Hoonah. It is located 56 mi (90 km) northwest of Gustavus, and 66 mi (106 km) southwest of Haines. Access to the face of the glacier is limited to the Johns Hopkins Inlet.

The peak elevation of the glacier is 1811 ft (552 m). The terminus has a height of 225–330 ft (68–100 m) and a width of 1 mile (1.6 km). Many tributary glaciers from the nearby mountains combine to form the Johns Hopkins glacier, creating around 50 medial moraines at the points of contact.

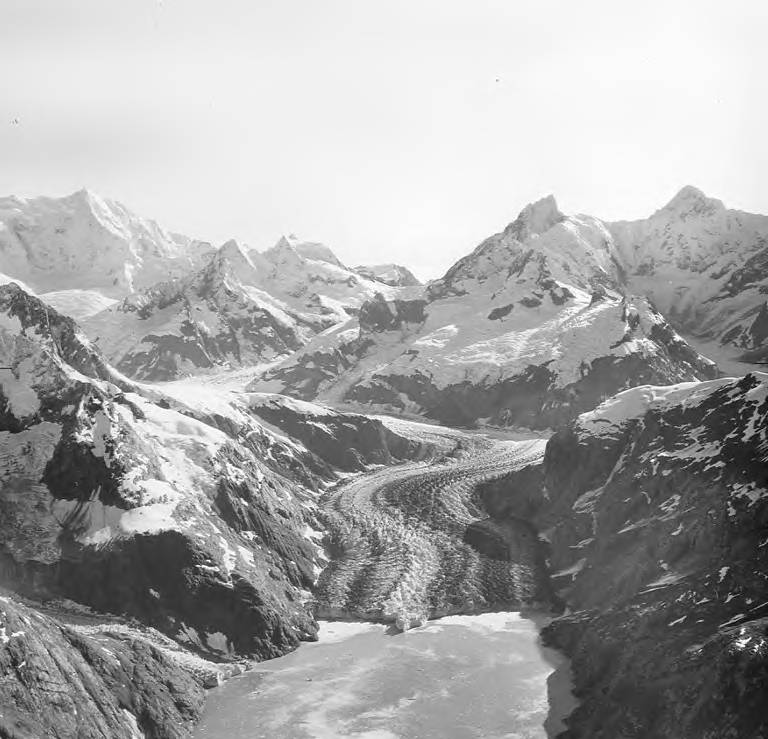
A closer look at the terminus of Johns Hopkins Glacier

== Advancement ==
Most glaciers around the world are retreating, meaning they are losing size, volume, or length due to climate change. Tidewater glaciers in Alaska, those that flow from mountains and terminate in water, are especially prone to retreat as most of the ice that feeds them is thinning. Advancing glaciers that are gaining volume or length are rare and usually require special circumstances to occur. This makes the Johns Hopkins Glacier, which has been advancing since the 1920s, an unusual exception.

The reason for the Johns Hopkins Glacier's advancement is the presence of a submarine end moraine that inhibits calving and melting. This leads to less overall mass lost and an increase in thickness of the glacier. Additionally, the Fairweather Range supplies the glacier with large amounts of snowfall. In the last 80 years, the velocity of the terminus has steadily decreased, it has advanced 1 mile (1.6 km), and has become 328 ft (100 m) thicker.

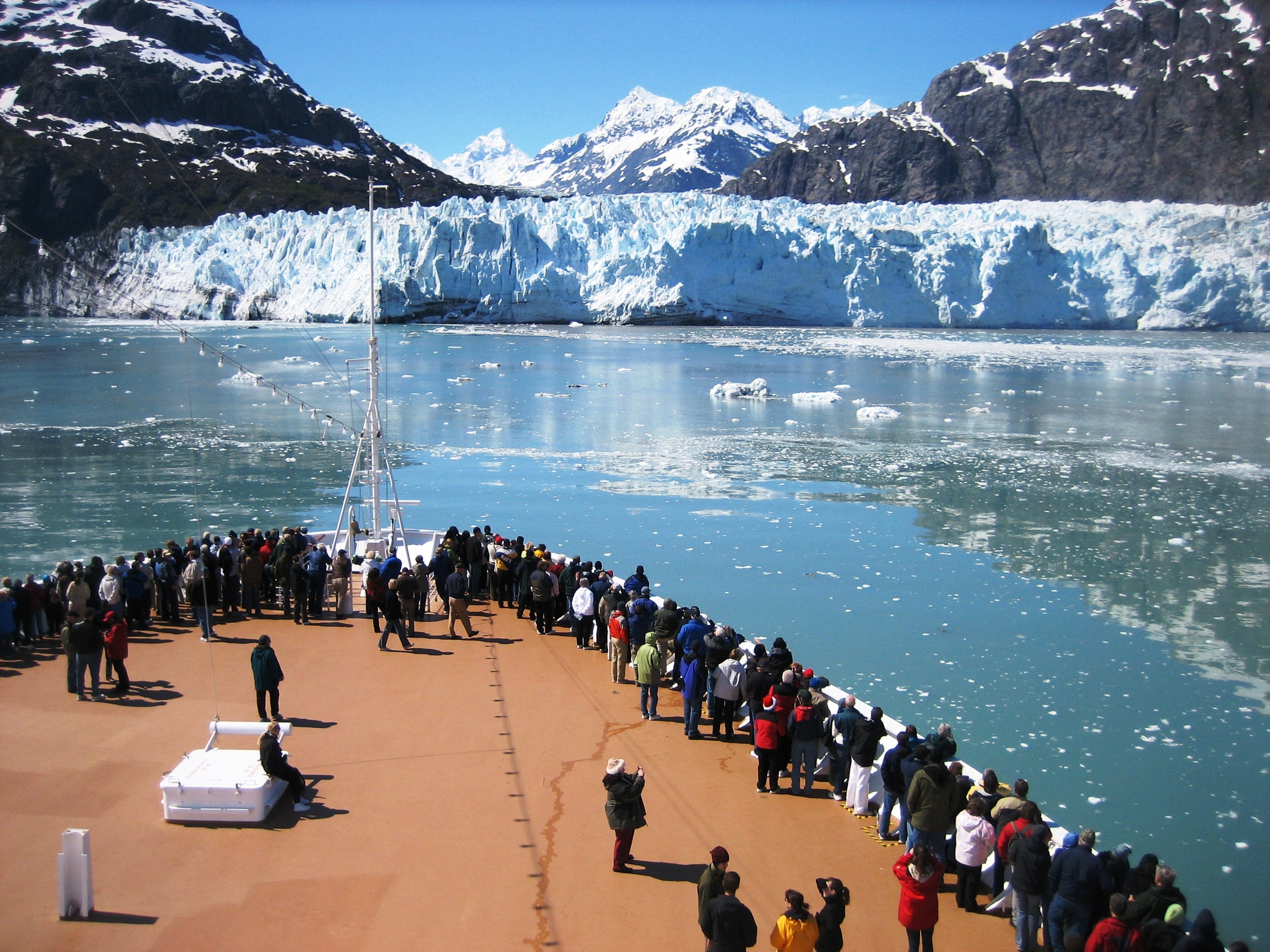
A cruise ship full of tourists viewing Glacier Bay

== Accessibility ==
Glacier Bay National Park and Preserve, which has been protected since 1925, has long been a scene of scientific study as well as a tourist attraction for cruise ships. Of the 7 tidewater glaciers in Glacier Bay that were all once easily accessible by cruise ships, only two remain approachable: Margerie and Johns Hopkins. This means that the Johns Hopkins Glacier may soon be the last accessible tidewater glacier in Glacier Bay.

One disadvantage of the Johns Hopkins Glacier's advancing movement is the loss of habitat for harbor seals. Over 2,000 seals aggregate in Johns Hopkins Inlet every summer, making it the largest accumulation of such seals anywhere in Glacier Bay. These seals rely on icebergs, which form from calving glaciers, for molting and pupping, as well as predator avoidance. Therefore, the lack of icebergs formed from the Johns Hopkins glacier's advancing nature poses a threat to the lifestyle of these harbor seals. Because of this, cruise ships in the area are prohibited from drawing near to the Johns Hopkins Glacier in the summer months to avoid disturbances to these seals.

== See also ==
- List of glaciers
