= Clark Glacier (Alaska) =

Glacier in Alaska, United States

- Location within Alaska
- Interactive map of Clark Glacier
- Type: Mountain glacier
- Location: Hoonah–Angoon Census Area, Alaska, US
- Coordinates: 58°48′41″N 137°06′28″W
- Length: 8-mile (13 km)

Clark Glacier is an 8-mile (13 km) long glacier located on Mount Abbe in Glacier Bay National Park and Preserve in the U.S. state of Alaska. It leads northwest to its 1961 terminus at the head of Johns Hopkins Inlet, 78 mi (126 km) northwest of Hoonah, Alaska. It was named by W. O. Field and W. S. Cooper in 1936 for Johns Hopkins University professor of geology William Bullock Clark (1860–1917).

== See also ==
- List of glaciers in the United States
