= Marble (disambiguation) =

Marble is a type of rock resulting from the metamorphism of limestone.

Marble or Marbles may also refer to:

== Other common meanings ==
- Marble (toy), a small spherical toy usually made from glass, clay, steel, or agate
- Marbles, a game using the toy; often Ring Taw
- Marble sculpture

== People ==
- Marble (surname)

== Places ==
=== Canada ===
- Marble Range, British Columbia, a mountain range
- Marble Peak (British Columbia)
- Marble Island, Nunavut

=== United States ===
- Marble, Arkansas, an unincorporated community
- Marble, Colorado, a town
- Marble, Minnesota, a city
- Marble, North Carolina, an unincorporated community and census-designated place
- Marble City, Oklahoma, often shortened to Marble, a town
- Marble, Pennsylvania, an unincorporated community
- Marble, Washington, an unincorporated community
- Marble, Wisconsin, a ghost town
- Marble Mountains (Siskiyou County), California
- Marble Mountains (San Bernardino County), California
- Marble Creek (Mississippi River tributary), Missouri
- Marble Creek (St. Francis River tributary), Missouri
- Marble Spring, a stream in Georgia
- Marble Township (disambiguation)

=== Multiple countries ===
- Marble Canyon (disambiguation)
- Marble Mountain (disambiguation)

=== Elsewhere ===
- Marble Peak (Antarctica)
- Marble Point, Victoria Land, Antarctica
- Marble Mountains (Vietnam)

== Music ==
- Marble (band), a Japanese musical duo
- Marbles (band), the solo music project of Robert Schneider of The Apples in Stereo
- The Marbles (duo), a 1960s English rock duo
- Marble, a 2004 album by Casiopea
- Marble (album), a 1996 album by Fanatic Crisis
- Marbles a 1994 single by Plastikman
- Marbles (album), a 2004 album by Marillion
- Marble (EP), a 2023 EP by Ai Otsuka

== Other ==
- Marble Arms
- Marble Brewery (Manchester, England), a microbrewery
- Marble butterflies, American butterfly in the tribe Anthocharini
- Marble cheese of the cheddar family
- Marble fish or marbled flathead, the Pseudaphritis urvillii
- Marble (software), a free and open-source virtual globe, atlas, and map program
- Marbles Kids Museum, Raleigh, North Carolina
- Marbles, a play by Nigel Williams (author)
- Marbles, a fictional character, one of Snoopy's siblings from the comic strip Peanuts

== See also ==
- Marble Church (disambiguation)
- Marbling (disambiguation)
- Marbell, a Japanese rock band
- Marbel, another name for Koronadal, a city and capital of the province of South Cotabato, Philippines
