= Marble Mountains =

Marble Mountains may refer to:

- Marble Mountains (Vietnam)
- Marble Mountains (Siskiyou County), California, USA
- Marble Mountains (San Bernardino County), California, USA

== See also ==
- Marble Mountain (disambiguation)
