= Mount Salisbury =

Mountain in Alaska, United States

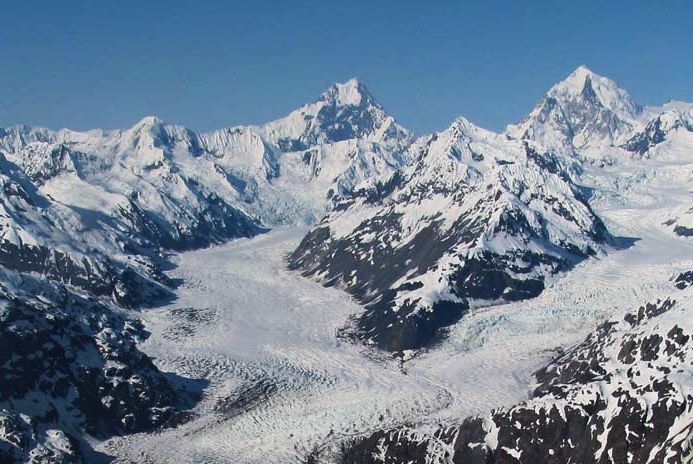
- Mount Salisbury centered in the distance beyond Margerie Glacier, with Mount Tlingit to right.

Highest point
- Elevation: 12,170 ft (3,709 m)
- Prominence: 3,970 ft (1,210 m)
- Parent peak: Mount Tlingit
- Isolation: 3.04 mi (4.89 km)
- Listing: Highest US summits (#176)
- Coordinates: 58.850818°N 137.372745°W

Naming
- Etymology: Rollin D. Salisbury

Geography
- Location within Alaska
- Country: United States
- State: Alaska
- Census Area: Hoonah–Angoon
- Protected area: Glacier Bay National Park and Preserve
- Parent range: Fairweather Range
- Topo map: USGS Mount Fairweather D-5

Climbing
- First ascent: 1977 by J Nelson, S Swenson, J Eberharter, G Thompson
- Easiest route: glacier/snow/ice climb

Mount Salisbury is a 12,170-foot (3,709 m) peak in the Fairweather Range of Alaska, six miles (10 km) southeast of Mount Fairweather. Its east slopes feed one of the northern branches of the Johns Hopkins Glacier, which flows into Glacier Bay. On its western side is a large cirque, shared with Mount Fairweather, Mount Quincy Adams, and Lituya Mountain, which heads the Fairweather Glacier; this flows almost to the Pacific coast at Cape Fairweather.

Though not exceptional in terms of absolute elevation, Mount Salisbury does possess great vertical relief over local terrain: for example, the southwest side of the mountain drops over 10,000 feet (3,048 m) to the Johns Hopkins Glacier in only five miles.

Mount Salisbury is not often climbed, partly due to its proximity to the higher and better-known Mount Fairweather, and partly due to difficult access and the typically bad weather that this range possesses.

== Etymology ==
The mountain was named by W. O. Field, Jr. and William Skinner Cooper in 1936 to honor Rollin D. Salisbury (1858–1922), American geologist and professor of geology at the University of Chicago from 1892 until his death. The mountain's toponym was officially adopted in 1937 by the United States Board on Geographic Names.

== Gallery ==
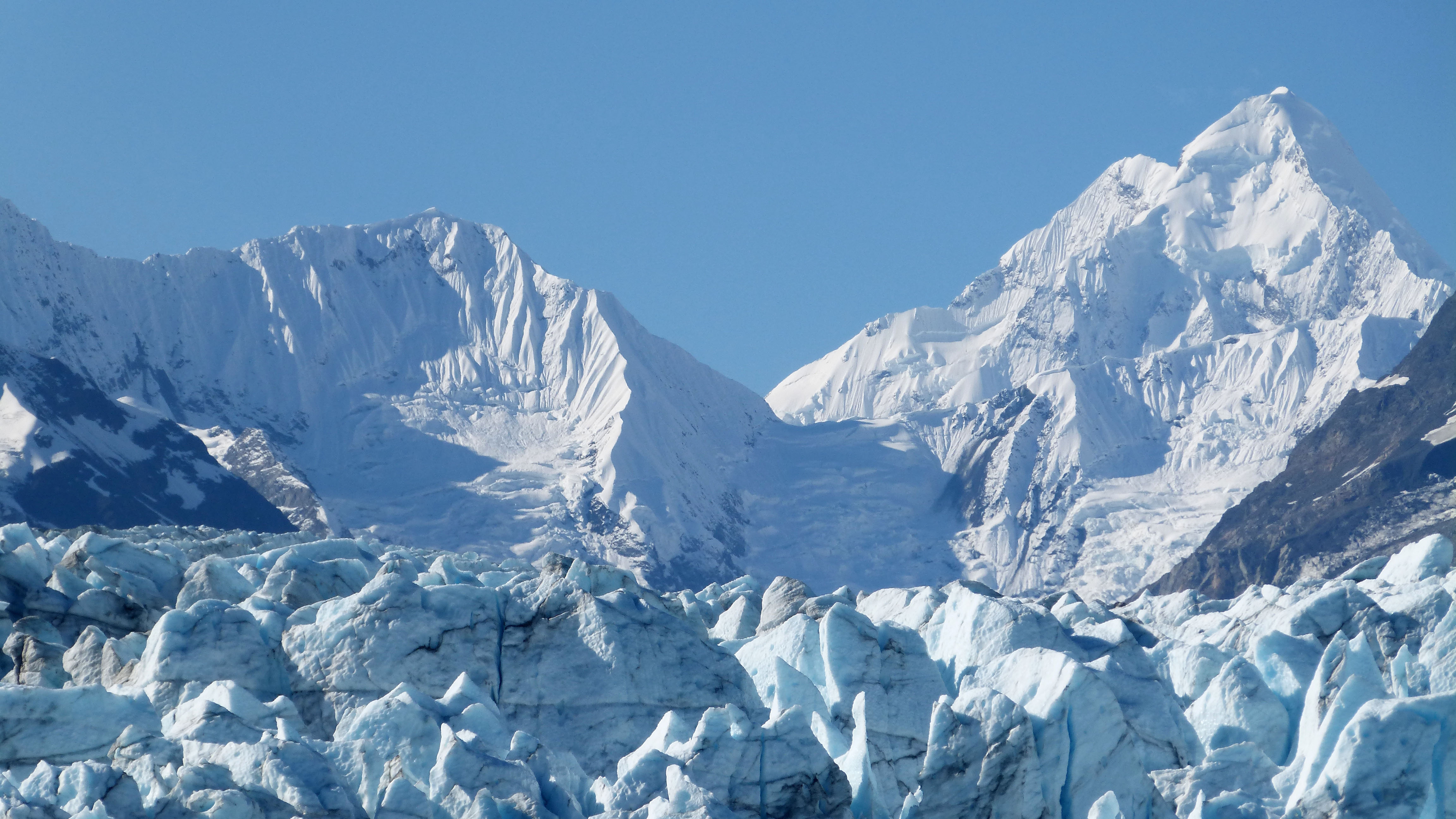
Mount Salisbury to right

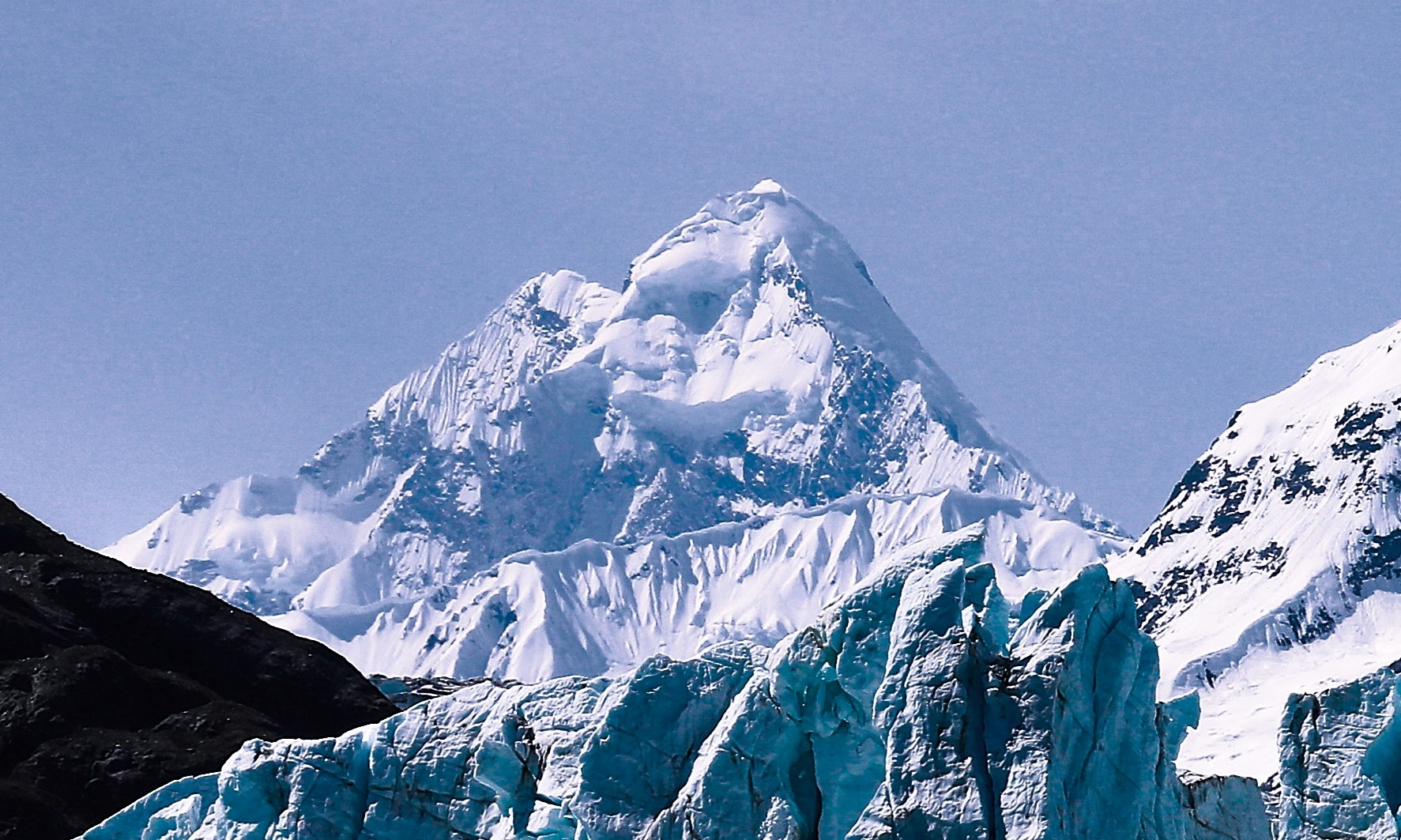
Northeast aspect

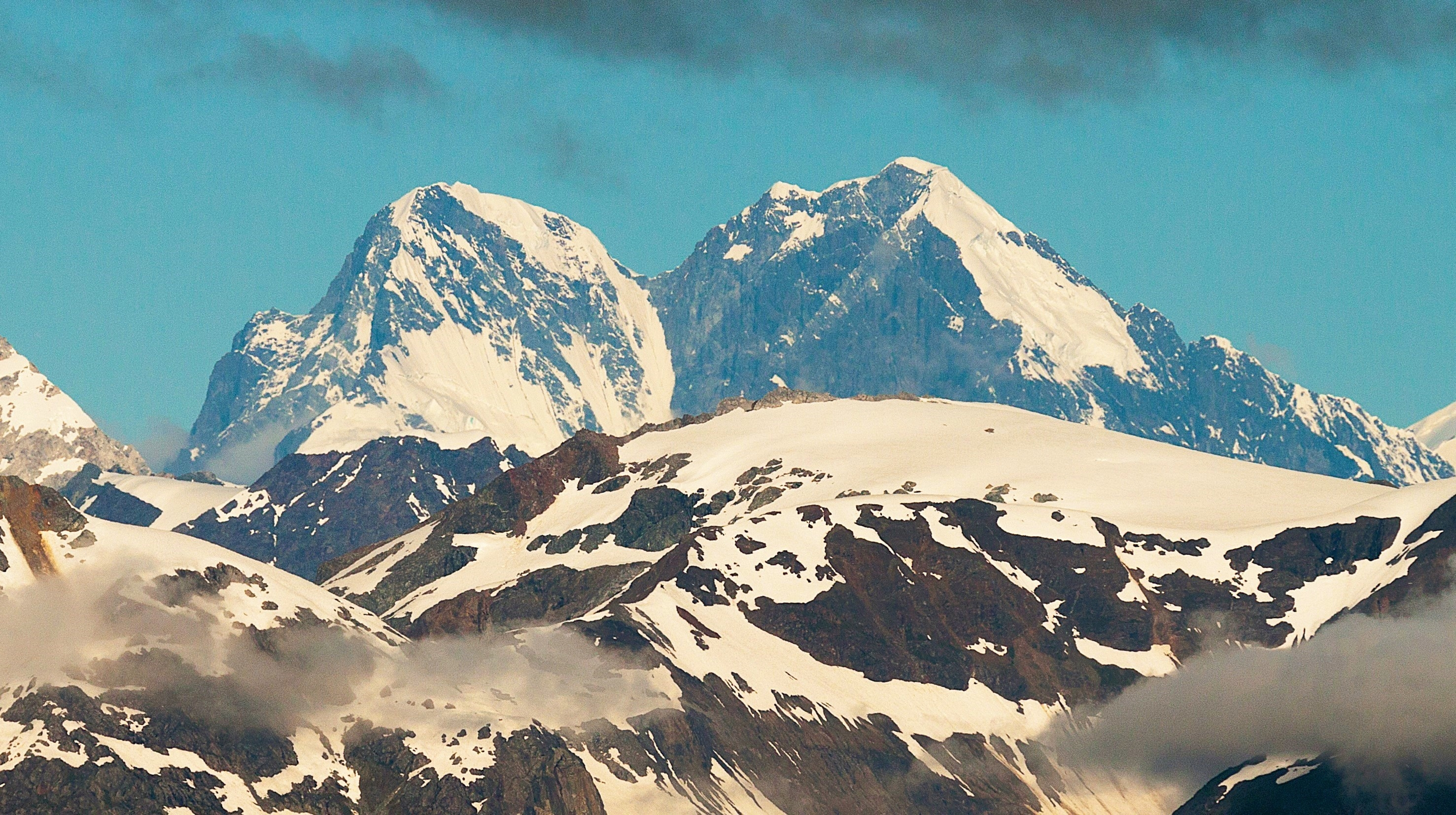
East aspect
