= Marble Creek =

Marble Creek may refer to:

- Marble Creek (Mississippi River tributary), a stream in Missouri
- Marble Creek (St. Francis River tributary), a stream in Missouri
