= Blue Marble (disambiguation) =

The Blue Marble is an image of Earth taken by the crew of Apollo 17 on December 7, 1972, from a distance of about 29,000 kilometers (18,000 miles) from the planet's surface.

Blue Marble may also refer to:

- Big Blue Marble, a half-hour children's television series that ran from 1974 to 1983
- The Blue Marble, an album by the American sunshine pop band Sagittarius
- Blue Marble Energy, a US-based company which utilizes hybridized bacteria to produce specialty biochemicals and renewable biogas
- Blue Marble Game, a Korean board game similar to Monopoly
- Blue Marble Geographics, a developer and provider of geographic information system software products
- Elaeocarpus angustifolius (also Blue Marble Tree), a large and fast growing rainforest tree
- Blue Marble, satellite imagery used as background in NASA WorldWind and NASA's FIRMS

== See also ==
- Marble (disambiguation)
