= Tlingit Peak =

Mountain in Alaska, United States

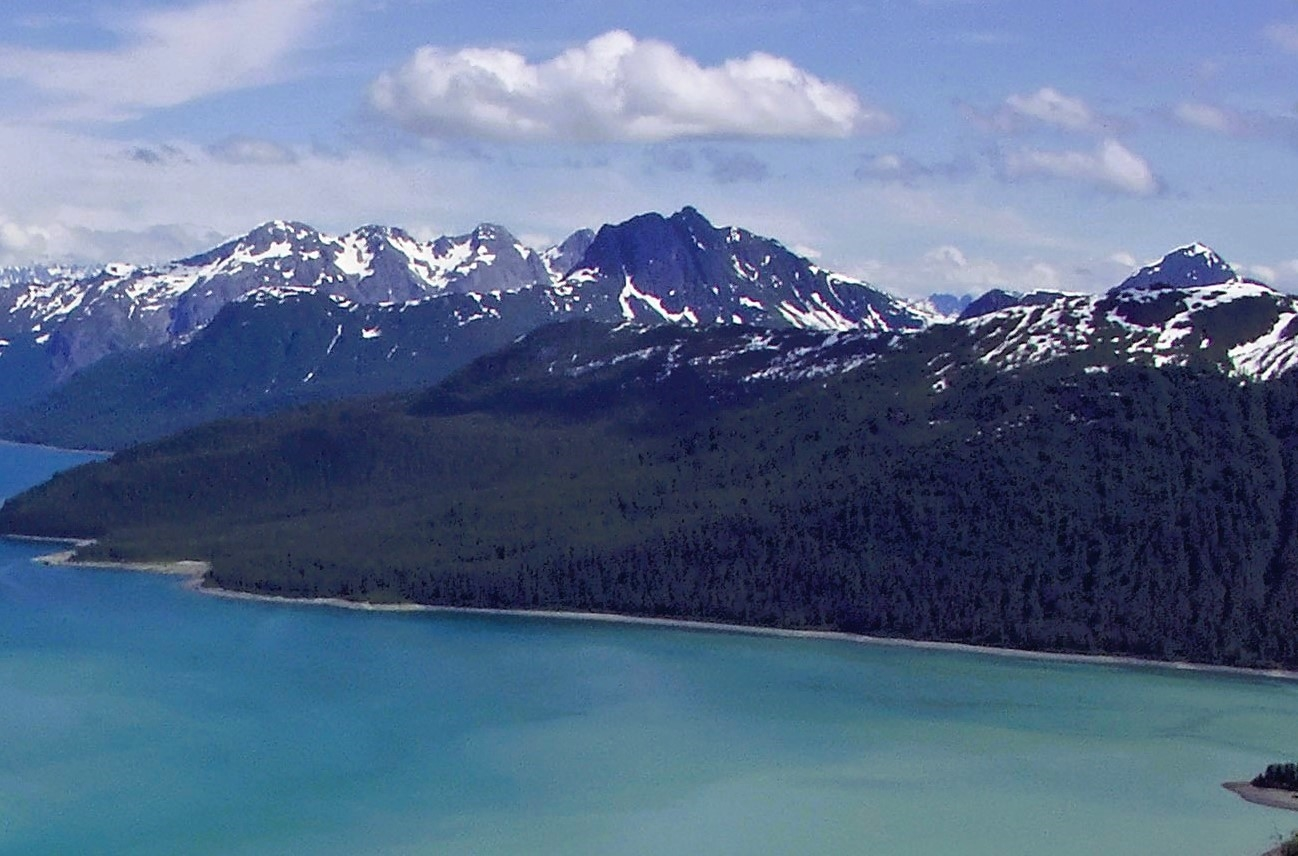
- West aspect, centered at top

Highest point
- Elevation: 3,274 ft (998 m)
- Prominence: 2,924 ft (891 m)
- Parent peak: Serrated Peak
- Isolation: 2.05 mi (3.30 km)
- Coordinates: 58°37′00″N 136°20′27″W

Naming
- Etymology: Tlingit

Geography
- Location within Alaska
- Country: United States
- State: Alaska
- Census Area: Hoonah–Angoon
- Protected area: Glacier Bay National Park
- Parent range: Saint Elias Mountains; Fairweather Range
- Topo map: USGS Mount Fairweather C-2

Tlingit Peak is a 3,274-foot (998 m) mountain summit in the US state of Alaska.

== Description ==
Tlingit Peak is located in the Fairweather Range of the Saint Elias Mountains. It is set within Glacier Bay National Park and Preserve and is situated 2.14 miles (3.44 km) southwest of Marble Mountain. Precipitation runoff from the mountain drains into Geikie Inlet. Although modest in elevation, topographic relief is significant as the summit rises above tidewater of Tyndall Cove in one mile (1.6 km). The mountain's name was reported in 1951 by U.S. Geological Survey and the toponym has been officially adopted by the U.S. Board on Geographic Names. The peak is named after the Tlingit people. Other peaks within the park with the "Tlingit" name include Mount Tlingit and Mount Tlingit Ankawoo.

== Climate ==
Based on the Köppen climate classification, Tlingit Peak is located in a marine subpolar climate zone, with long, cold, snowy winters, and cool summers. Weather systems coming off the Gulf of Alaska are forced upwards by the Saint Elias Mountains (orographic lift), causing heavy precipitation in the form of rainfall and snowfall. Winter temperatures can drop below 0 °F with wind chill factors below −10 °F.

== See also ==
- Geography of Alaska
- Mountains of Glacier Bay National Park and Preserve
