= Serrated Peak =

Mountain in Alaska, United States

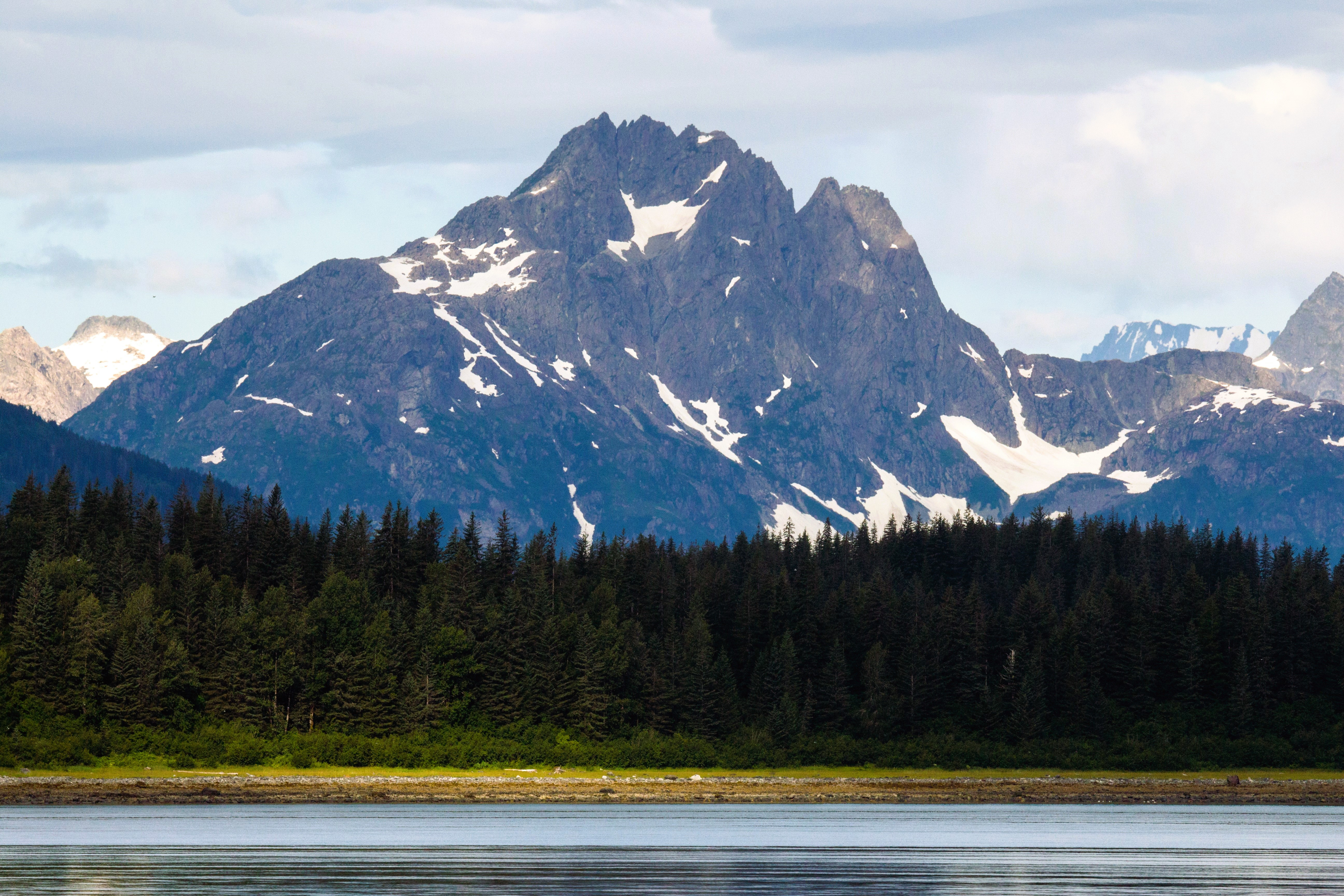
- East aspect

Highest point
- Elevation: 3,757 ft (1,145 m)
- Prominence: 1,807 ft (551 m)
- Parent peak: Blackthorn Peak
- Isolation: 4.79 mi (7.71 km)
- Coordinates: 58°30′19″N 136°28′41″W

Naming
- Etymology: Serration

Geography
- Location within Alaska
- Interactive map of Serrated Peak
- Country: United States
- State: Alaska
- Census Area: Hoonah–Angoon
- Protected area: Glacier Bay National Park
- Parent range: Saint Elias Mountains; Fairweather Range
- Topo map: USGS Mount Fairweather C-2

Geology
- Rock type: Diorite

Serrated Peak is a 3,757-foot (1,145 m) mountain summit in the US state of Alaska.

== Description ==
Serrated Peak is located in the Fairweather Range of the Saint Elias Mountains. It is set within Glacier Bay National Park and Preserve and is situated 5.8 miles (9.3 km) southeast of Blackthorn Peak. Precipitation runoff from the mountain drains into Dundas River, thence Icy Strait. Although modest in elevation, topographic relief is significant as the summit rises over 3,500 feet (1,067 m) above the Dundas River in 1.5 miles (2.4 km). The mountain's descriptive name was published in 1929 by the U.S. Forest Service and the toponym has been officially adopted by the U.S. Board on Geographic Names.

== Climate ==
Based on the Köppen climate classification, Serrated Peak is located in a marine subpolar climate zone, with long, cold, snowy winters, and cool summers. Weather systems coming off the Gulf of Alaska are forced upwards by the Saint Elias Mountains (orographic lift), causing heavy precipitation in the form of rainfall and snowfall. Winter temperatures can drop below 0 °F with wind chill factors below −10 °F.

== Gallery ==
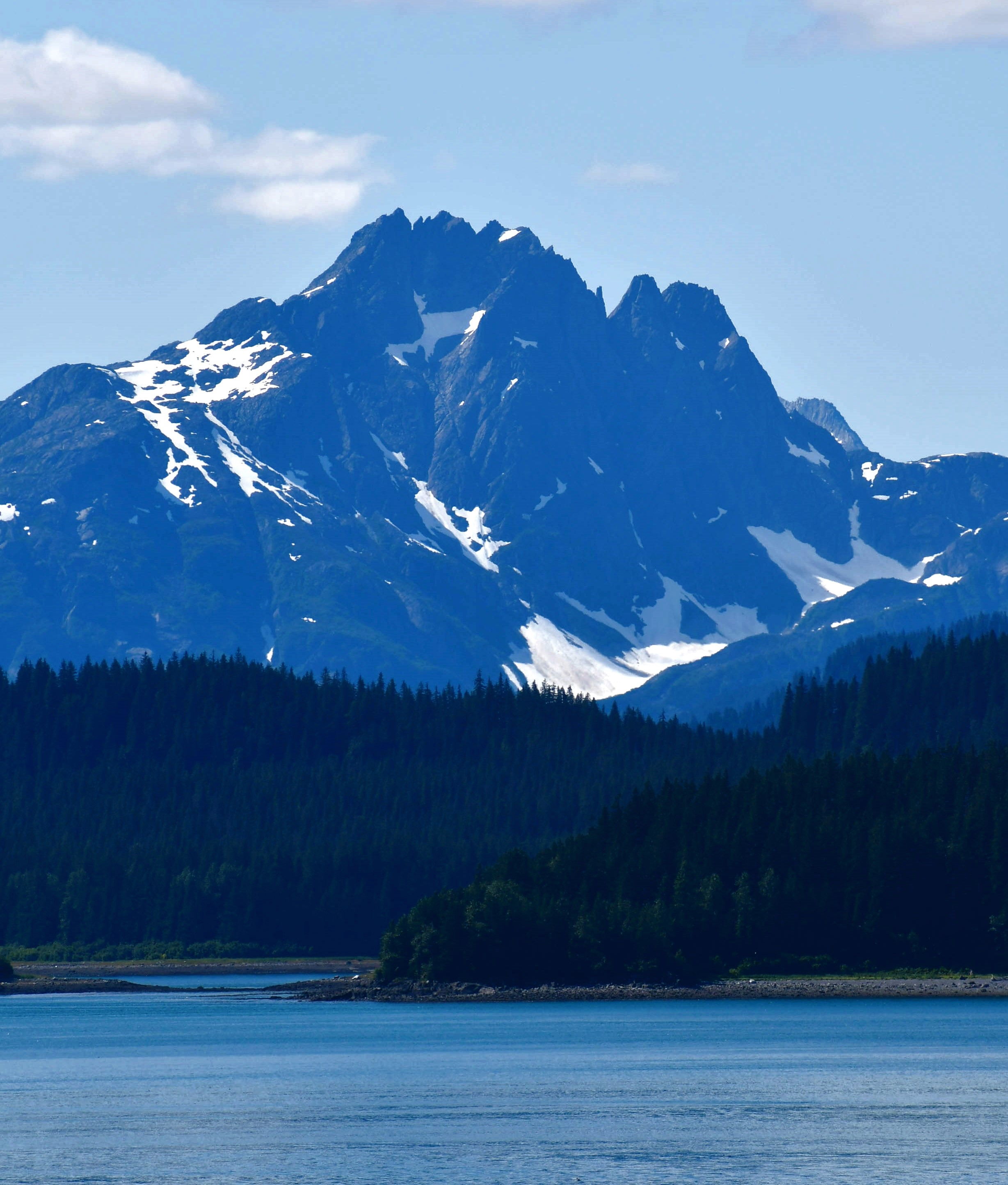
East aspect

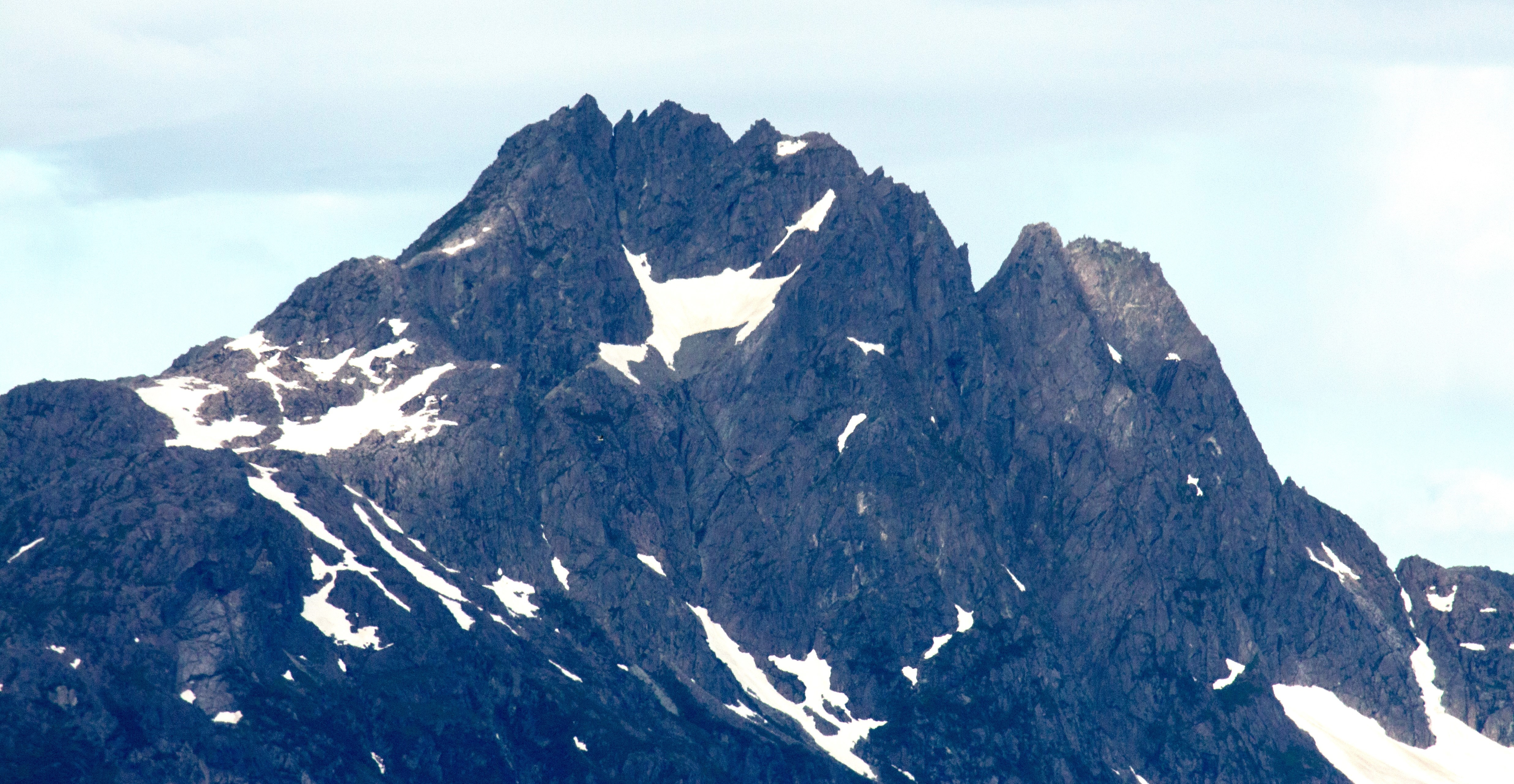
Summit detail

== See also ==
- Geography of Alaska
- Mountains of Glacier Bay National Park and Preserve
