= Marble (surname) =

Marble is a surname. Notable people with the surname include:

- Alexander Marble (1902–1992), American medical doctor and diabetologist
- Alice Marble (1913–1990), American tennis player
- Allan Marble (born 1939), Canadian biomedical engineer, genealogist, and medical historian
- Dan Marble (1810–1849), American comedic actor
- Devyn Marble (born 1992), American basketball player
- Edward Marble (1846–1900), American actor and songwriter, son of Dan Marble
- Ella M. S. Marble (1850-1929), American physician
- Frank E. Marble (1918–2014), American engineer and scientist in the field of aerodynamics and combustion
- Harmon Percy Marble (1870–1945), American journalist and politician, mayor of Las Vegas
- Harriet Marble (1885–1966), African-American woman pharmacist, the first in Kentucky
- John Hobart Marble (1869–1913), American attorney and government official
- Manton Marble (1835–1917), American journalist, proprietor and editor of the New York World newspaper from 1860 to 1876
- Roy Marble (1966–2015), American basketball player
- Scott Marble (1847–1919), American playwright
- Sebastian Streeter Marble (1817–1902), American politician, governor and state senator of Maine
- Thomas L. Marble (1876–1952), justice of the New Hampshire Supreme Court
- Vicki Marble (fl. 2010s), American politician and Colorado state senator
- Webster Marble (1854–1930), American inventor and entrepreneur
