= Marble Mountain =

Marble Mountain may refer to:

== Mountains ==
- Marble Mountain (Alaska) in Glacier Bay National Park, USA
- Marble Mountain (Colorado) in Colorado, USA
- Marble Mountain (Newfoundland) in Newfoundland, Canada
- Marble Mountain (New Jersey) in New Jersey, USA
- Marble Mountains (Siskiyou County) in California, USA
- Marble Mountains (San Bernardino County) in California, USA
- Marble Mountains (Vietnam), Vietnam

== Communities ==
- Marble Mountain, Nova Scotia, Canada
- Marble Mountain, California, United States

== Other uses ==
- Marble Mountain Ski Resort
- Marble Mountain Wilderness
- Marble Mountain-Trout Creek Hill
- Marble Mountain Air Facility, abandoned helicopter facility used during the Vietnam War
