= Marbling =

Marbling may refer to:

- The quality of a surface that has streaks of color, like marble. For example:
  - Marbleizing, also called faux marbling, the art of painting walls or furniture to look like real marble
  - Paper marbling, a method of aqueous surface design in which paper or fabric is decorated with a spotted pattern similar to stone, as well as other swirled and combed patterns
  - Marbled meat, the pattern of fat in beef steaks
- Marbling, a form of birth control in horse breeding, involving a marble used as an intrauterine device
