= Marble Mountain (Alaska) =

Mountain in Alaska, United States

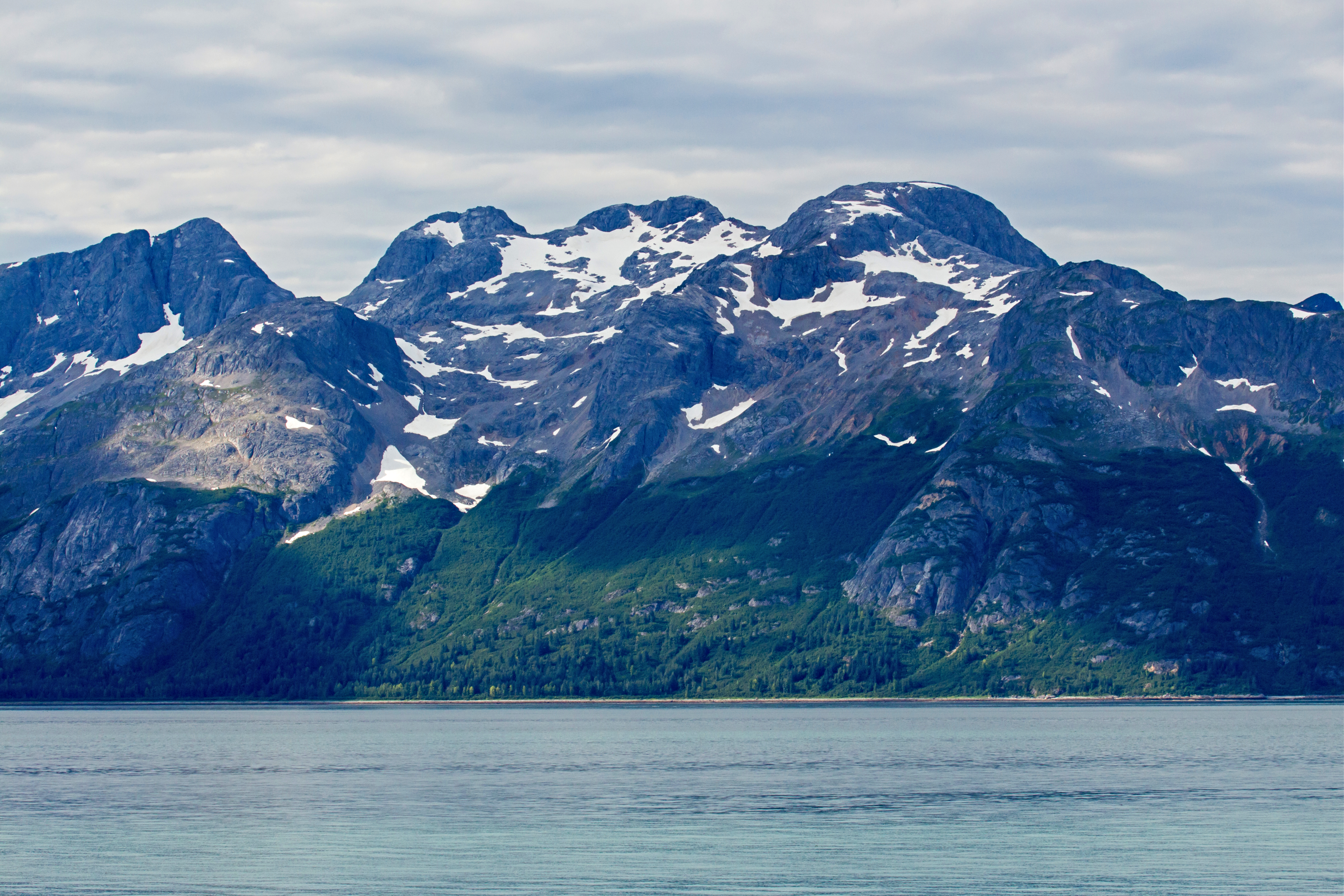
- Marble Mountain, northeast aspect

Highest point
- Elevation: 3,366 ft (1,026 m)
- Prominence: 566 ft (173 m)
- Parent peak: Peak 3390
- Isolation: 1.08 mi (1.74 km)
- Coordinates: 58°38′27″N 136°18′20″W

Geography
- Location within Alaska
- Country: United States
- State: Alaska
- Census Area: Hoonah–Angoon
- Protected area: Glacier Bay National Park
- Parent range: Fairweather Range; Saint Elias Mountains
- Topo map: USGS Mount Fairweather C-1

Marble Mountain is a 3,366-foot (1,026-meter) mountain summit located in the Fairweather Range of the Saint Elias Mountains, in southeast Alaska. The peak is situated in Glacier Bay National Park and Preserve at the entrance to Geikie Inlet, 68 mi (109 km) west-northwest of Juneau, and 10.7 mi (17 km) east-northeast of Blackthorn Peak. Although modest in elevation, relief is significant since the mountain rises up from tidewater in Shag Cove in less than one mile. The mountain's name was in local use as reported by the United States Geological Survey in 1951. Marble Mountain can be seen from Glacier Bay which is a popular destination for cruise ships. The months May through June offer the most favorable weather for viewing and climbing Marble Mountain.

== Climate ==
Based on the Köppen climate classification, Marble Mountain is located in a subpolar oceanic climate zone, with long, cold, wet winters, and cool summers. Weather systems coming off the Gulf of Alaska are forced upwards by the Saint Elias Mountains (orographic lift), causing heavy precipitation in the form of rainfall and snowfall. Winter temperatures can drop below 0 °F with wind chill factors below −10 °F. Precipitation runoff from the mountain drains into Glacier Bay Basin.

== Gallery ==
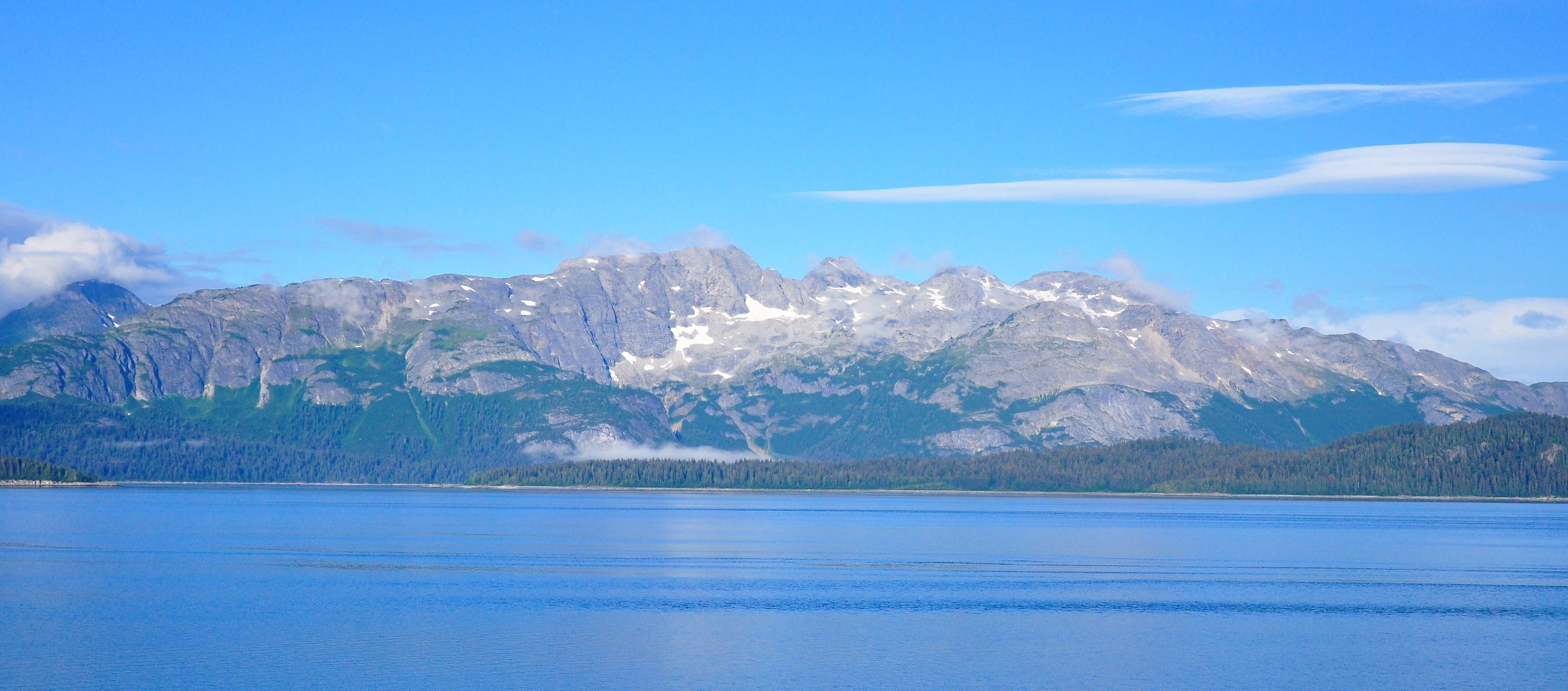
East aspect of Marble Mountain

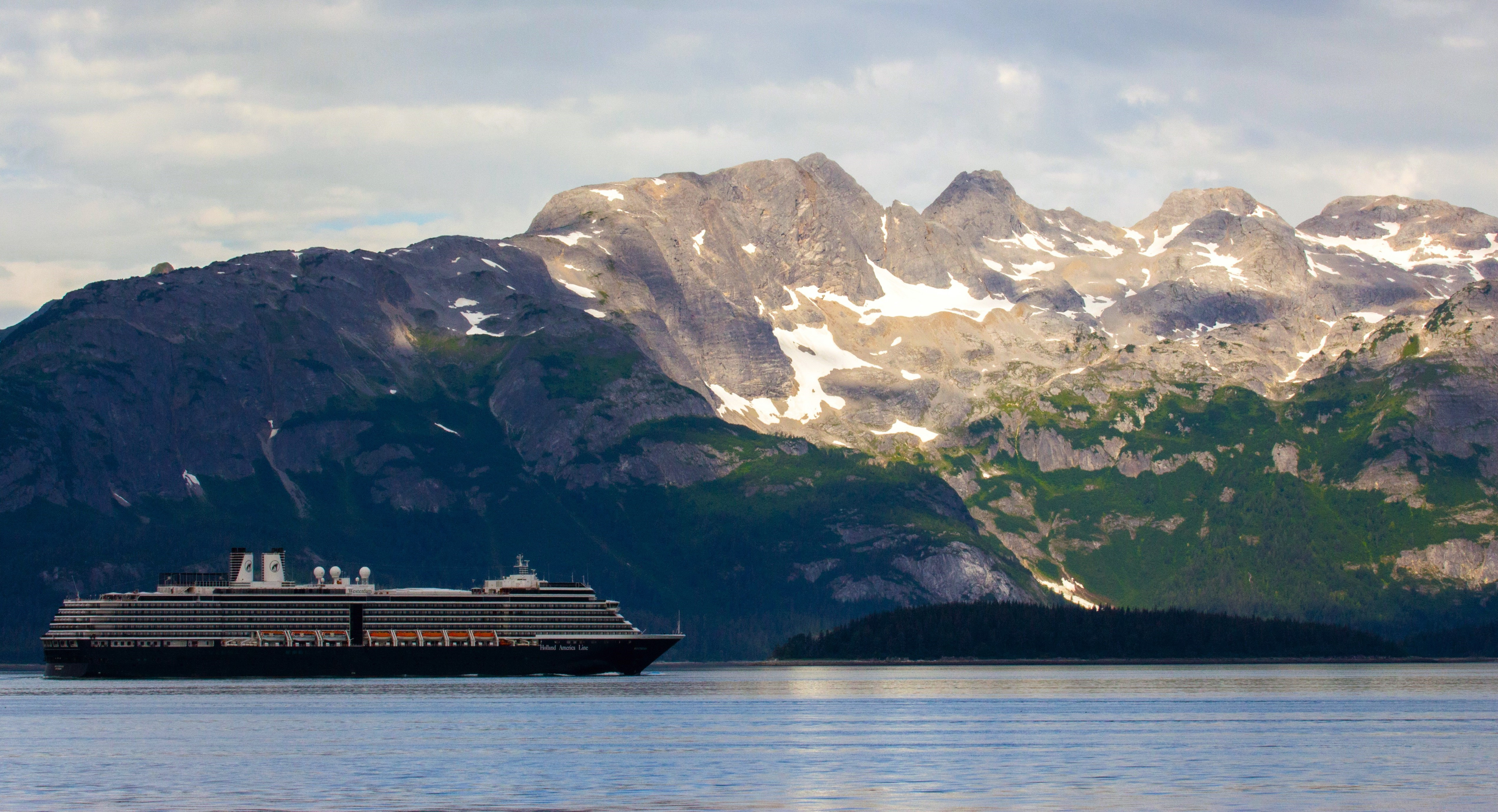

== See also ==
- List of mountain peaks of Alaska
- Geography of Alaska
