= Marble Canyon (disambiguation) =

Marble Canyon is the section of the Colorado River canyon in northern Arizona from Lee's Ferry to the confluence with the Little Colorado River.

Marble Canyon may also refer to:

- Marble Canyon (British Columbia), in the south-central interior of British Columbia
- Marble Canyon (Canadian Rockies), west of Banff in Kootenay National Park
- Marble Canyon, Arizona, an unincorporated community in northern Arizona
- Marble Canyon National Monument, a former national monument established to protect Marble Canyon
