= Harriet Marble =

African-American pharmacist

Harriet B.S. Marble
- Born: May 2, 1885; Yazoo City, Mississippi, US
- Died: January 12, 1966 (aged 80); Fayette County, Kentucky, US
- Education: Meharry Medical College
- Known for: First African-American woman pharrmacist in Kentucky

Harriet Beecher Stowe Marble (May 2, 1885 – January 12, 1966) was an early African-American woman pharmacist and the first in Kentucky, gaining her degree from Meharry Medical College in 1906. She practiced in pharmacies in several states before establishing her own drugstore in Lexington, Kentucky. Marble served as Vice President of the National Medical Association, after serving as an officer of the Association's pharmaceutical section.

== Early life and education ==
Harriet Marble was born in Yazoo City, Mississippi on 2 May 1885. Her parents were Solomon and Lear Ann (Molette) Marble, and she had a sister, Lillie Marble Ray.

Marble graduated from Yazoo City High School in 1903, and gained a bachelor's degree in pharmacy from Meharry Medical College in Nashville in 1906. She passed examinations for pharmacists in several states, gaining the highest marks of 77 applicants in Mississippi in 1908.

== Career ==
From 1907 to 1909, Marble worked at a Jeter and Jeter drugstore in Oklahoma City, then at a Brown and Fisher drugstore in Laurel, Mississippi from 1909 to 1911. She then worked for two years as a hospital pharmacist at then Tuskegee Normal and Industrial College in Alabama. From 1915, Marble operated her own drugstore in Yazoo City, before moving to Lexington, Kentucky in 1921 along with other members of her family.

Marble remained in Lexington for the rest of her life, becoming "one of the most successful business women in Kentucky". She owned a property at 118 North Broadway, which she renovated into a combination of physician offices, a pharmacy, and a residence where she lived for the remainder of her life. Marble was also partner of a company that sponsored concerts in Lexington by Cab Calloway and Duke Ellington.

She was elected as an office-bearer of the pharmaceutical section of the National Medical Association (NMA) in 1913, and as vice president of the NMA in 1919.

== Personal life ==
Marble was a Catholic, and a supporter of the Progressive Party. She died in Kentucky on 12 January 1966 at the age of 80. Her will included provision for scholarships to the University of Kentucky, although it is not known if a bequest was made.

In 2009, an electrician doing work at the 118 North Broadway property found items belonging to Marble in the attic, including correspondence with Madame C.J. Walker, the first African-American business woman to become a millionaire.
