= Mount Tlingit =

Mountain summit in Alaska, US

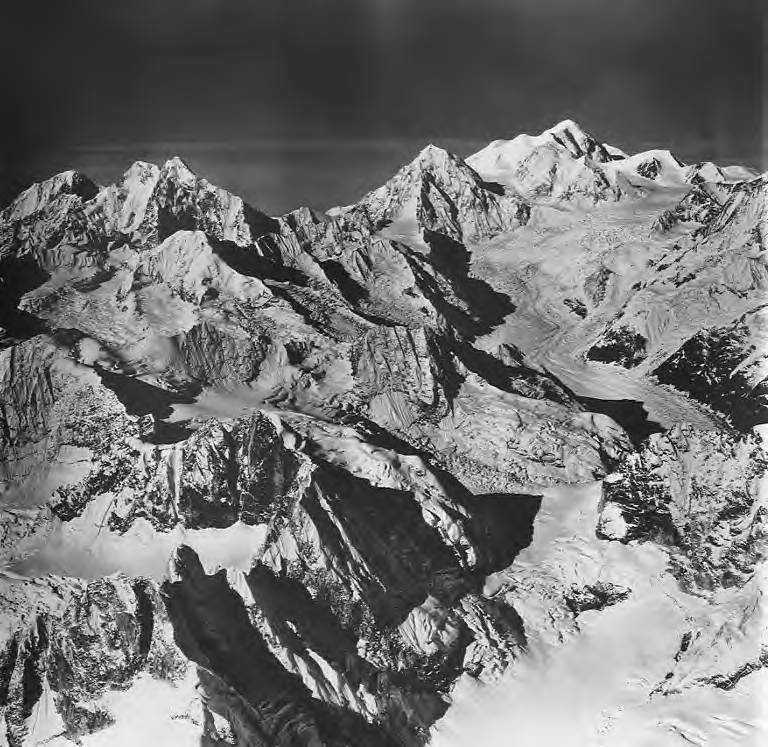
- Mt. Tlingit centered at top (Mt. Fairweather to right); Aerial view from east (1973)

Highest point
- Elevation: 12,606 ft (3,842 m)
- Prominence: 2,056 ft (627 m)
- Parent peak: Mount Quincy Adams (13,620 ft)
- Isolation: 2.34 mi (3.77 km)
- Listing: Alaska highest major peaks 29th; US highest major peaks 137th
- Coordinates: 58°53′35″N 137°23′38″W

Naming
- Etymology: Tlingit

Geography
- Location within Alaska
- Interactive map of Mount Tlingit
- Location: Hoonah–Angoon Census Area; Alaska, United States
- Protected area: Glacier Bay National Park
- Parent range: Fairweather Range; Saint Elias Mountains
- Topo map: USGS Mount Fairweather D-5

Climbing
- Easiest route: Mountaineering

Mount Tlingit is a 12,606-foot (3,842-meter) mountain summit in Alaska, United States. It lies approximately 2 miles southeast of Mount Quincy Adams and 5 miles east of Mount Fairweather.

== Description ==
Mount Tlingit is part of the Fairweather Range which is a subrange of the Saint Elias Mountains. The glaciated peak is located in Glacier Bay National Park, 2.3 mi (4 km) southeast of the Canada–United States border, and 4.8 mi (8 km) east of Mount Fairweather, which is the highest peak in the Fairweather Range. Tlingit ranks as the sixth-highest peak in the park and 76th-highest in Alaska. Precipitation runoff and meltwater from its surrounding glaciers drains into Glacier Bay Basin and the Gulf of Alaska. The mountain's toponym has not been officially adopted by the United States Board on Geographic Names. Mount Tlingit should not be confused with officially-named Tlingit Peak (3,169 feet) which is also within Glacier Bay National Park.

== Climate ==
Based on the Köppen climate classification, Mount Tlingit has a subarctic climate with cold, snowy winters, and cool summers. Winter temperatures can drop below −20 °C with wind chill factors below −30 °C. This climate supports the Margerie Glacier to the east of the summit and Fairweather Glacier to the southwest. The months May through June offer the most favorable weather for viewing or climbing.

== Gallery ==
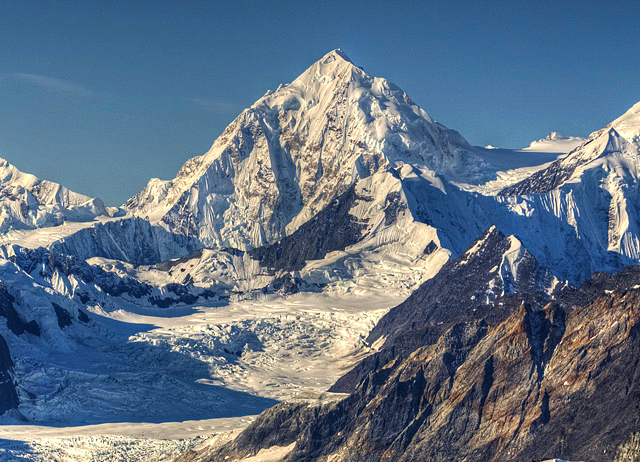
Mt. Tlingit

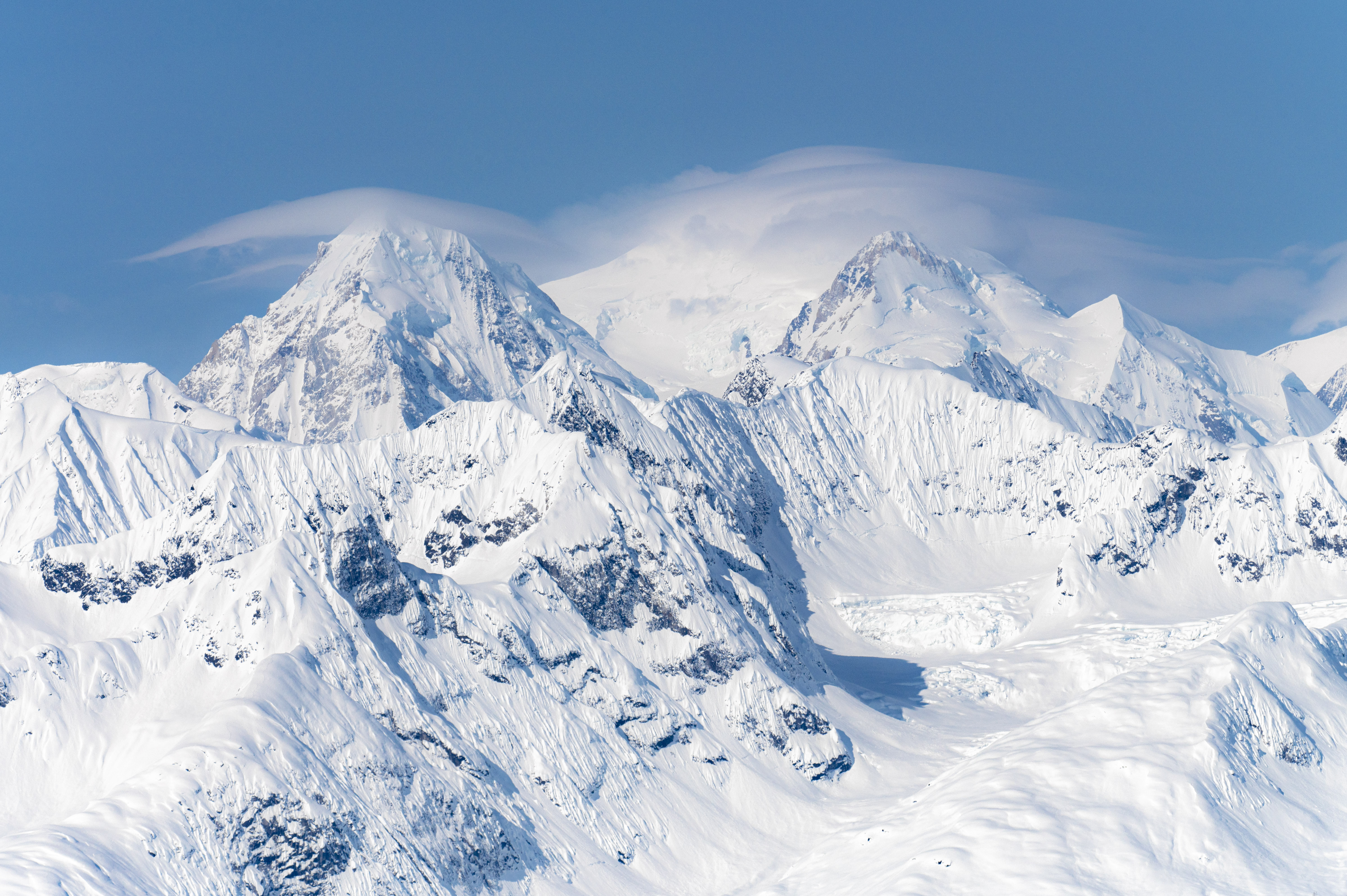
Mount Tlingit to the left

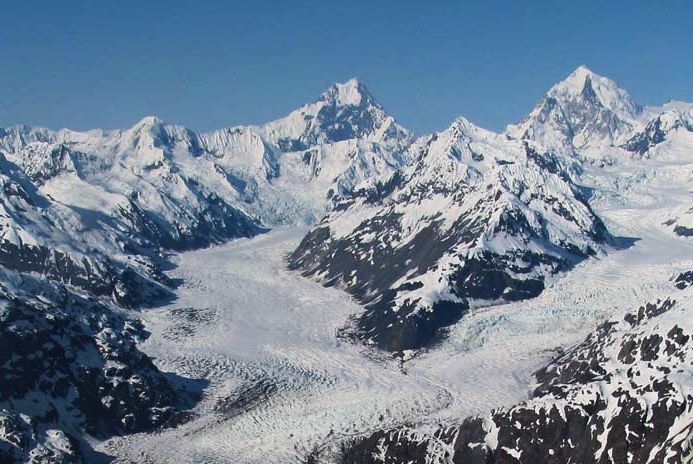
Aerial view of Mt. Salisbury (center) and Mt. Tlingit (right)

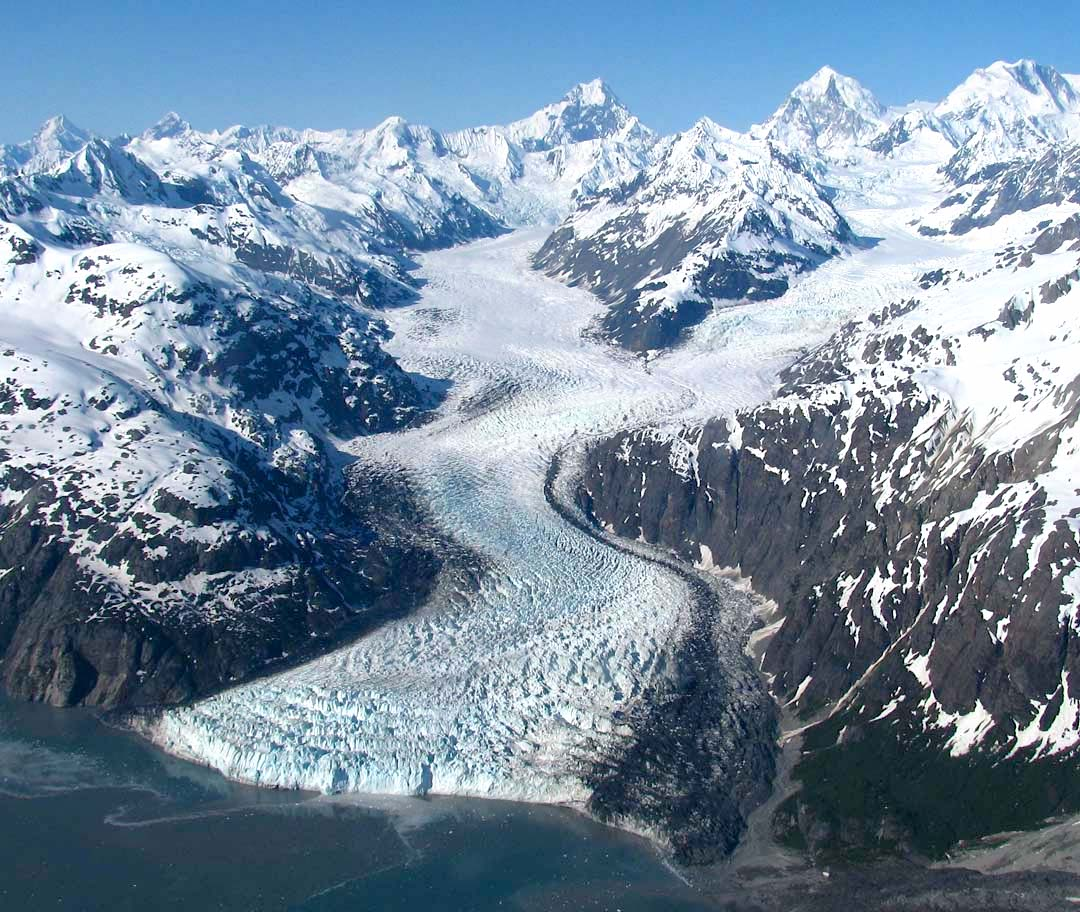
Aerial view of Marjorie Glacier with Mt. Salisbury, Mt. Tlingit, and Mt. Quincy Adams across the top of frame.

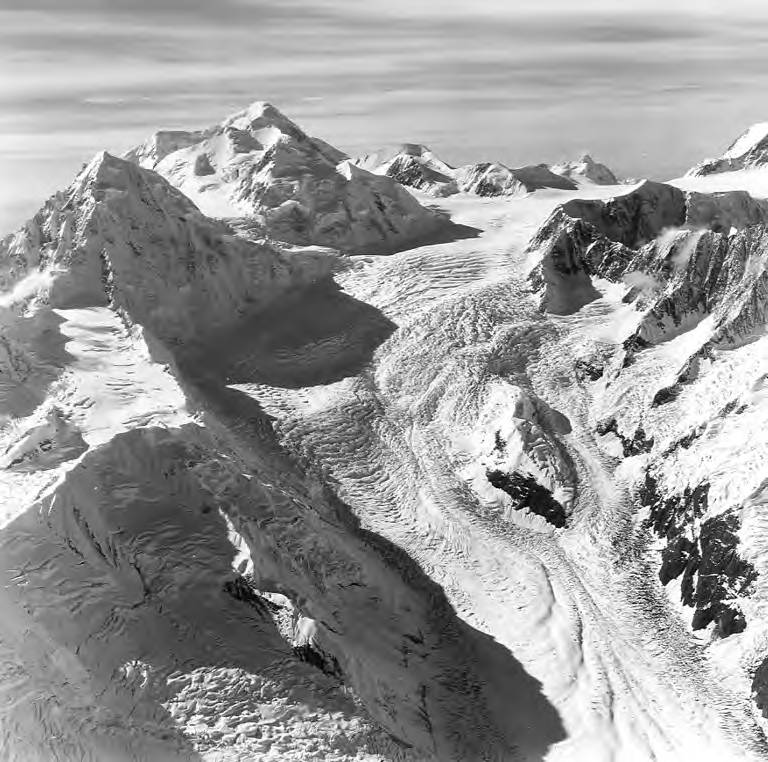
Mt. Tlingit (left) with Mt. Quincy Adams behind

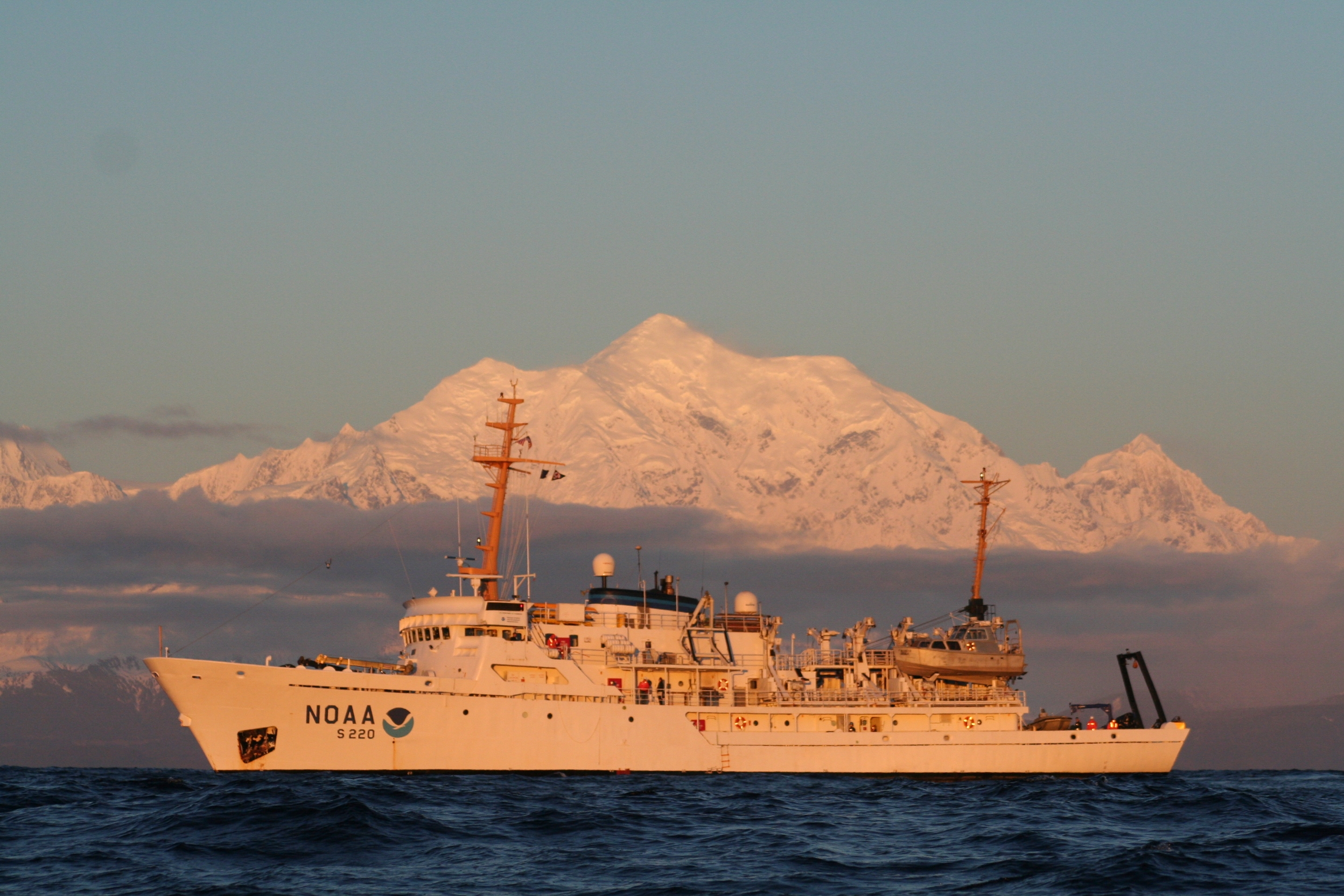
Mount Fairweather centered with Mount Tlingit to right

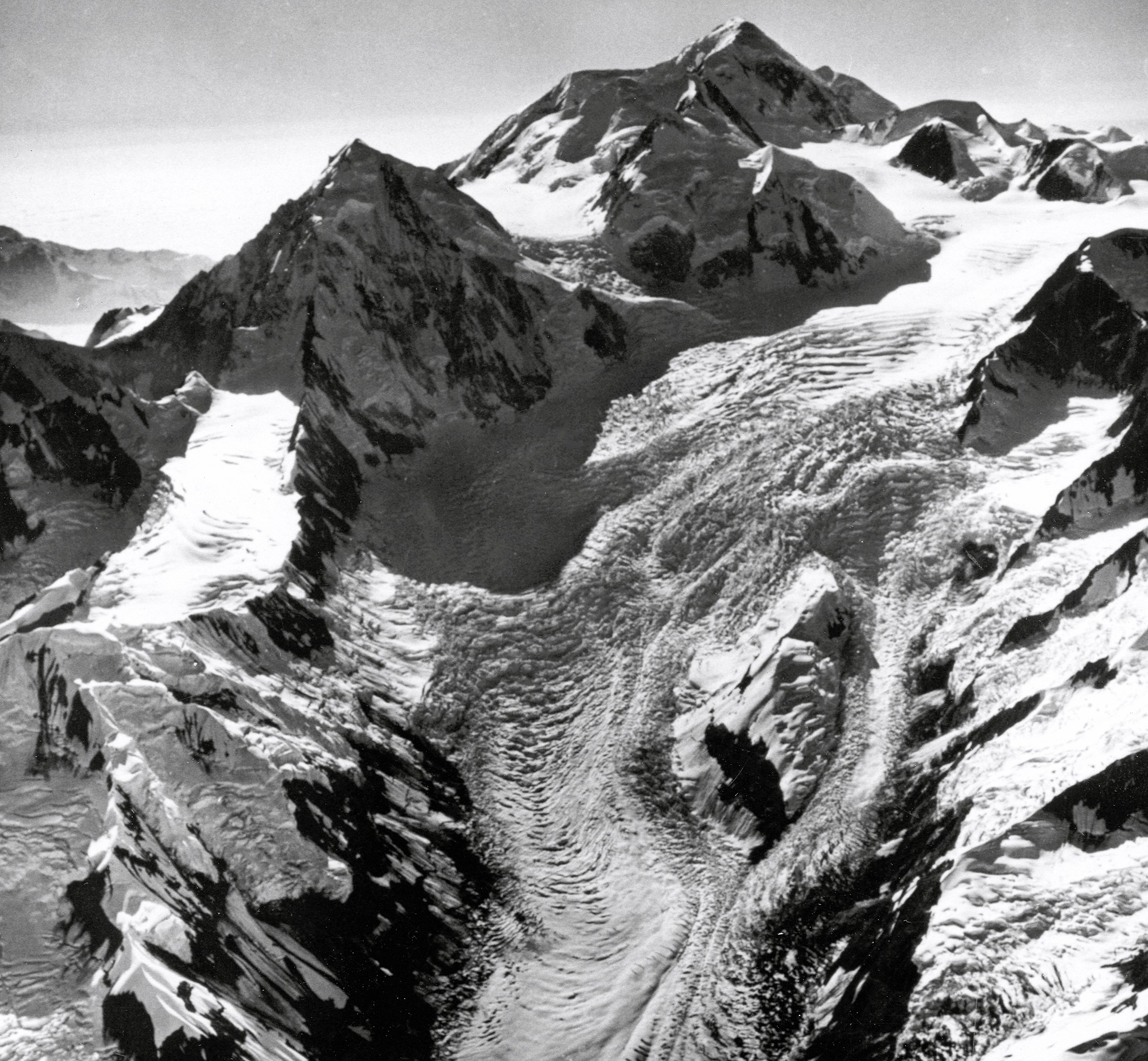
Aerial view of Mount Tlingit (left) with Mt. Quincy Adams and Mount Fairweather at the top.

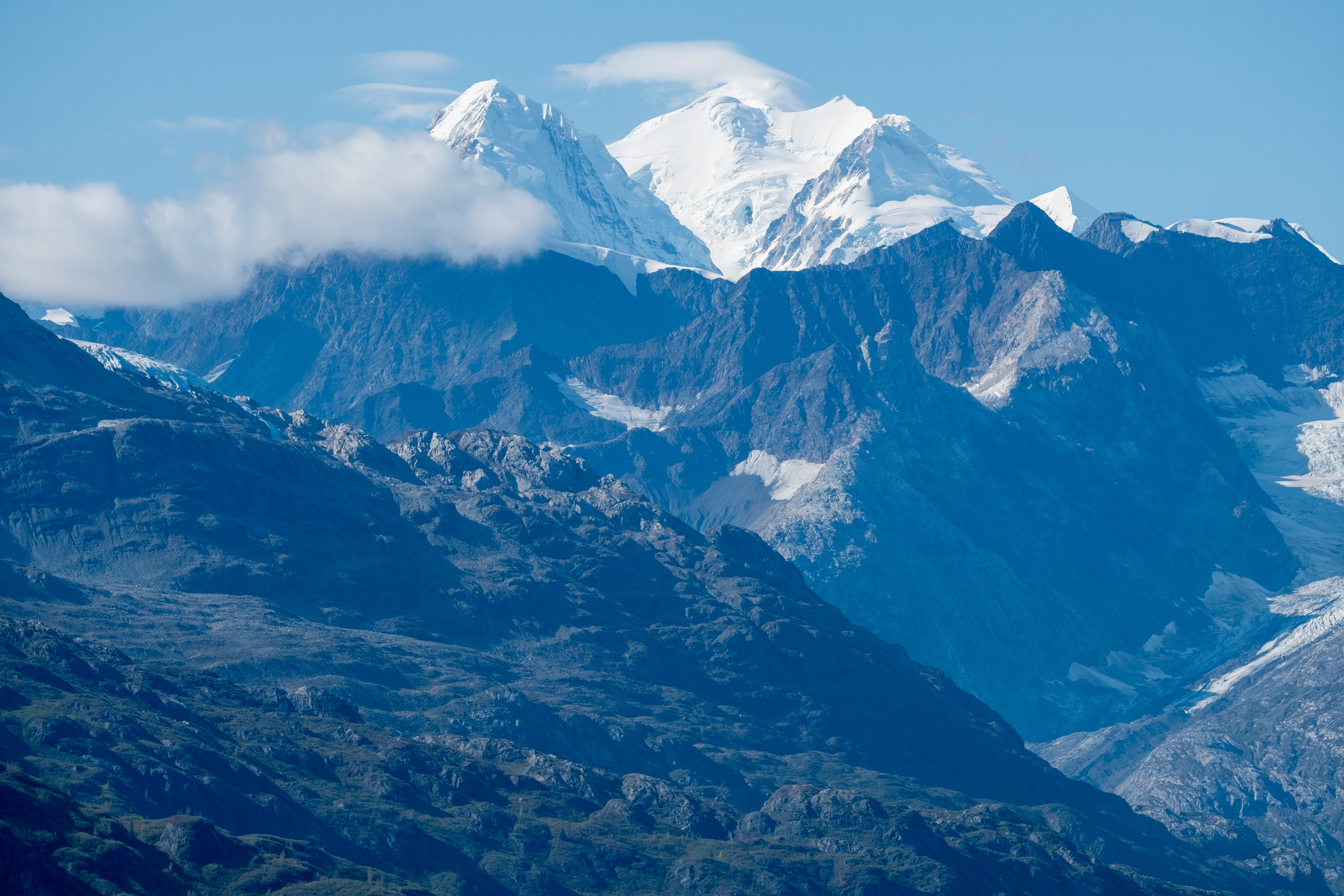
Mount Tlingit and Mount Fairweather from east

== See also ==
- Geography of Alaska
