= Marble Spring =

Stream in Chattooga County, Georgia, U.S.

Coordinates: 34°26′18.32″N 85°20′13.84″W

Marble Spring is a stream in Chattooga County, in the U.S. state of Georgia.

Marble Spring was named after the deposits of marble in the area.
