= Blue Marble Game =

South Korean board game

Blue Marble Game (Korean: 부루마불게임) is a South Korean board game manufactured by Si-Yat-Sa. It is played similar to Monopoly. While Monopoly is traditionally played across locations in a single city, the Blue Marble Game features cities from across the world; its title is a reference to The Blue Marble photograph taken by the crew of Apollo 17, and its description of the Earth as seen from space.

The game was first published in 1982. It can be played by 2 to 4 players.

== Gameplay ==
Players move around the board in order to buy property, build buildings on the properties, pay rent to other players, and earn a salary. There are also random events cards called Golden Key cards. The game ends when all but one player has gone bankrupt. This is similar to Monopoly.

== Comparison to Monopoly ==
Similarities to Monopoly include:

- two 6 sided dice
- a salary of ₩200000 ($200) earned when passing start.
- increasing value of properties as players progress to spaces further from start.
- properties based (mostly) on real locations.
- functionally similar spaces, start (GO) the deserted island (Jail) and Welfare (Free Parking under certain Monopoly house rules)
- extension of the player's turn after rolling doubles.

=== Won ===
The game currency is in Korean Won, rather than dollars. The denominations are a thousand times greater than those in Monopoly. The lowest denomination is ₩1000, which corresponds to $1.

=== Board layout ===
Blue Marble

Welfare	Buenos Aires	Golden Key	Sao Paulo	Sydney	Busan	Hawaii	Lisbon	Queen Elizabeth	Madrid	Space Travel
Montreal	부루마불									Tokyo
Berlin	부루마불									Space Shuttle Columbia
Golden Key	부루마불									Paris
Zurich	부루마불									Rome
Concord	부루마불									Golden Key
Stockholm	부루마불									London
Copenhagen	부루마불									New York
Golden Key	부루마불									Pay Welfare
Athena	부루마불									SEOUL OLYMPIC
Deserted Island	Istanbul	Cairo	Golden Key	Singa-pore	Jeju Island	Manila	Hong Kong	Golden Key	Taipei	Start

Most of the color spaces on the board represent cities in the world, with the exception of Hawaii. The railroad spaces are replaced by Jeju Island, The Concord, Busan, the Queen Elizabeth 2 ocean liner, and the Space Shuttle Columbia. Having combinations of these does not raise the price of rent.

The board includes several spaces with special rules:-

- Deserted Island Space - This space corresponds to the Jail space in Monopoly, however, there is no "Go to Jail" Space. Players are stuck on the deserted island if they land on it. There are also key cards that send players to the Deserted Island. Once there, the player is stuck for three turns unless the player has the "Escape the Deserted Island" card or rolls doubles. Players may not escape by paying bail, like in Monopoly. Also, rolling doubles more than twice consecutively does not force players to go to the deserted island.
- Welfare Space - This space corresponds to the Free Parking space in Monopoly, however, rather than functioning as an empty space, 2 things can happen here. If there are no funds in welfare, the player must pay 10% of their net worth to welfare. If there are funds in welfare, then the player collects all of the accumulated funds. Players must pay welfare every time they land on an empty welfare space or land on the Seoul Olympic space. A variant rule also exists where all fees owed to the bank from the Key cards are instead paid to welfare.
- Space Travel - This space corresponds with the "Go to Jail" space in Monopoly, but rather than going to jail as in Monopoly, the player may on their next turn go to any space on the board (including the Space Travel space or the deserted island). However, they must pay a fee to the owner of the Columbia Space shuttle, if it is owned. If the player is the owner of the Space Shuttle Columbia, then space travel is free.
- Seoul Olympic - Seoul was the host of the 1988 Olympics. This is the most valuable space on the board and corresponds to Boardwalk. Buildings can not be built on Seoul. Players who land on the Seoul Olympic space must pay ₩150,000 to welfare and ₩2,000,000 to its owner.
- Athens, Montreal, and Concorde are misspelled on the game board. This is likely due to the game creator and publisher's unfamiliarity with the names of these cities and airplane in English or their spellings. 'Atene' reflects the pronunciation Korean term for Athens, which likely came from German via Japanese. Montriol's io reflects the Hangul spelling of the city's name, and Concord reflects that the person in charge of the spelling assumed that the d was final based on the Hangul spelling.

=== Building ===
Players can build houses, office buildings and hotels. Players do not have to collect color combinations in order to build on their properties, but may build only when landing on a property they already own. There is an increase in rent on properties with buildings. Increases occur in the following increments:

- one house - small increase
- two houses - medium increase
- office building - large increase
- hotel - larger increase

The rulebook does not specifically state that there are building pre-requisites.

=== Bankruptcy ===
If a player does not have enough cash to pay off a debt, that player is bankrupt. The player can raise money by selling buildings at half price to the bank, or by selling owned properties back to the bank at full price, or to other players at any price. There is no mortgage system in the Blue Marble Game.

=== Statistics ===
In Blue Marble Game, there is no space that sends the player to the deserted island other than the deserted island space itself. Furthermore, rolling of doubles more than twice consecutively does not send the player to the deserted island. Therefore, the properties between the "Deserted Island" and "Space Travel" are not as likely to be landed on as the corresponding properties in Monopoly (between "Jail" and "Go to Jail").

Space Travel allows the player to choose to go to any space on the board. Thus, likelihood of landing on a particular space in Blue Marble Game can not be exactly calculated like in Monopoly, as players can choose to go to different spaces on the board based on current game conditions. Because of Space Travel, it is probably less likely that players would land on Blue Marble's "Seoul Olympic" space than on Monopoly's "Boardwalk" space, as space traveling players could opt to minimize their likelihood of landing on "Seoul Olympic" by choosing to travel to "Start". However, this too depends on current game conditions.
