= Mount Quincy Adams (Fairweather Range) =

Mountain in Alaska, U.S. and British Columbia, Canada

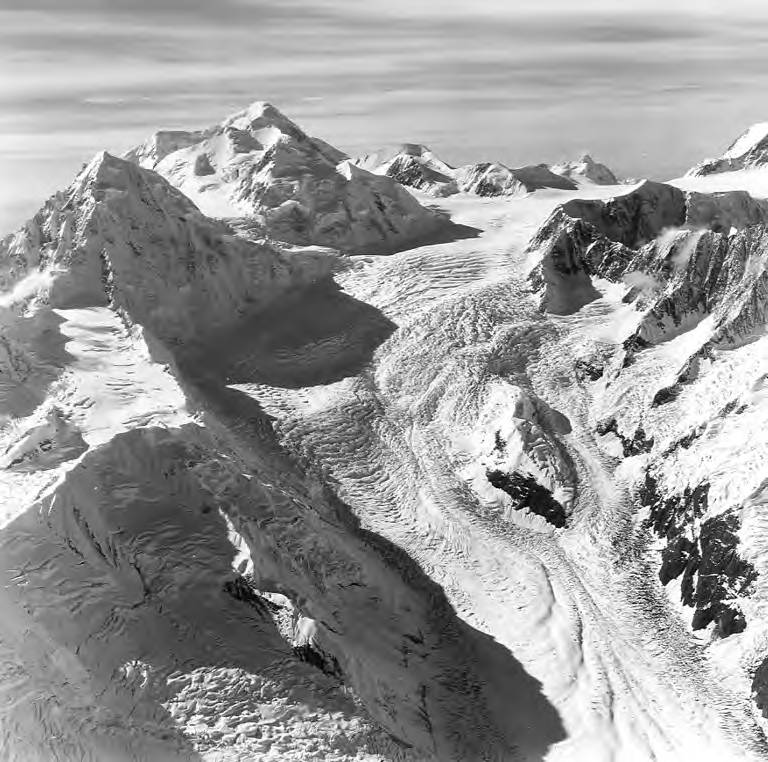
- Mount Quincy Adams in upper left, with Mount Tlingit below/left of it. Aerial view by Austin Post. 1972

Highest point
- Elevation: 4,150 m (13,620 ft)
- Prominence: 410 m (1,350 ft)
- Listing: Mountains of Alaska; Mountains of British Columbia
- Coordinates: 58°54′29″N 137°28′17″W

Geography
- Location within Alaska Location within British Columbia
- Location: Alaska Panhandle / Stikine Region, British Columbia
- Parent range: Fairweather Range
- Topo map(s): USGS Mount Fairweather D-5; Canada NTS 114I14 Mount Root

Climbing
- First ascent: Bradford Washburn, H. Adams Carter, 1934

Mount Quincy Adams (alternate Name Boundary Peak 163) is a mountain (Note: With less than 500 meters of prominence, Mount Quincy Adams may be classified as either an independent mountain or a sub-peak of Mount Fairweather) located on the border between United States and Canada. It is named after John Quincy Adams (1767–1848), the sixth president of the United States.

The southern and eastern flanks of the mountain are in Glacier Bay National Park, in Hoonah-Angoon Census Area, Alaska. The northern and northwestern flanks are in Tatshenshini-Alsek Park, in Stikine Region, British Columbia, making it the second highest peak in British Columbia. Mount Quincy Adams is closely (~5km) flanked to the west by Mount Fairweather 4,671 m (15,325 ft).
