= Marble Township =

Marble Township may refer to:

- Marble Township, Madison County, Arkansas
- Marble Township, Saline County, Arkansas, in Saline County, Arkansas
- Marble Township, Lincoln County, Minnesota
- Marble Township, Saunders County, Nebraska
