= Marble Church =

Marble Church may refer to:

- Frederik's Church, Copenhagen, Denmark
- Marble Church, Bodelwyddan, Wales

== See also ==
- Marble Collegiate Church, New York
- Marble Community Church, Colorado
