= Marble Creek (St. Francis River tributary) =

Stream in the US state of Missouri

Location
- Country: United States
- State: Missouri
- Counties: Iron and Madison

Physical characteristics
- Mouth: St. Francis River
  - location: Just east of French Mills, Madison County
  - coordinates: 37°26′55″N 90°28′42″W

Marble Creek is a stream in Iron and Madison Counties in the U.S. state of Missouri. It is a tributary of the St. Francis River.

The stream headwaters arise in Iron County southwest of Arcadia at 37°32′49″N 90°39′43″W and it flows southeast and then east to its confluence with the St. Francis in Madison County just east of French Mills at 37°26′55″N 90°28′42″W.

Marble Creek was so named because the limestone in the stream bed had the appearance of marble.

== See also ==
- List of rivers of Missouri
