= Blackthorn Peak =

Mountain in Alaska, United States

- Black Thorn
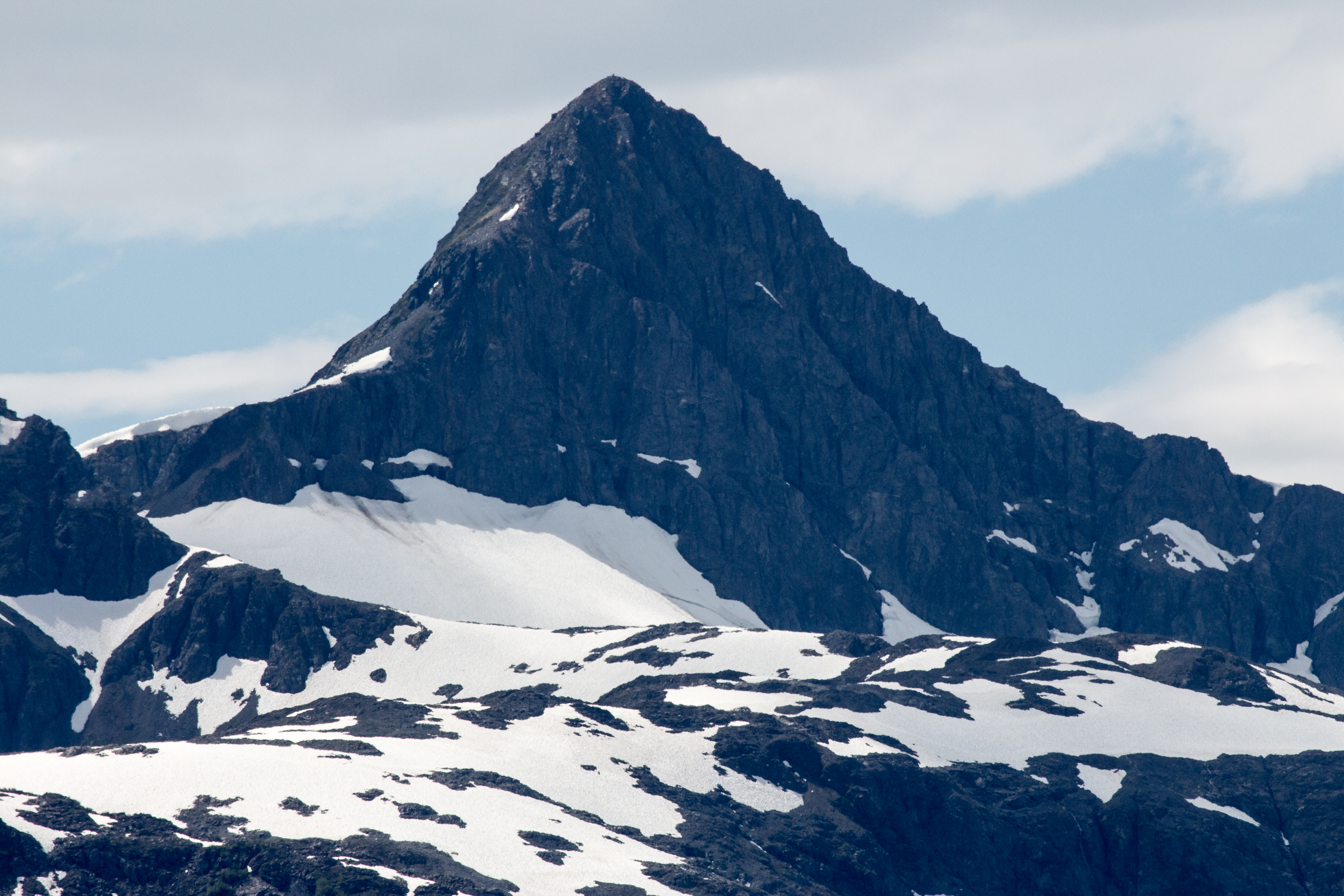
- Blackthorn Peak, northeast aspect

Highest point
- Elevation: 4,117 ft (1,255 m)
- Prominence: 1,900 ft (580 m)
- Parent peak: Mount Aleutka (5,200 ft)
- Isolation: 2.5 mi (4.0 km)
- Coordinates: 58°34′24″N 136°34′19″W

Geography
- Location within Alaska
- Interactive map of Blackthorn Peak
- Location: Glacier Bay National Park; Hoonah-Angoon; Alaska, United States
- Parent range: Fairweather Range; Saint Elias Mountains
- Topo map: USGS Mount Fairweather C-2

Climbing
- First ascent: 1898 by gold prospectors

Blackthorn Peak, also known as Black Thorn, is a 4,117 foot (1,255 meter) mountain summit located at the head of Glacier Bay's Geikie Inlet in Glacier Bay National Park and Preserve, in the Fairweather Range of the Saint Elias Mountains, in southeast Alaska. The mountain is situated immediately east of Geikie Glacier, 80 mi (129 km) west-northwest of Juneau, and 2.5 mi (4 km) north of Threesome Mountain, which is the nearest higher peak. Although modest in elevation, relief is significant since the mountain rises up from tidewater in a little over two miles. The mountain was given its descriptive name in 1896 by Harry Fielding Reid, an American geophysicist who studied glaciology in Glacier Bay. Weather permitting, Blackthorn Peak can be seen from Glacier Bay, which is a popular destination for cruise ships. The months May through June offer the most favorable weather for viewing or climbing the peak.

== Climate ==
Based on the Köppen climate classification, Blackthorn Peak is located in a subpolar oceanic climate zone, with long, cold, snowy winters, and cool summers. Weather systems coming off the Gulf of Alaska are forced upwards by the Saint Elias Mountains (orographic lift), causing heavy precipitation in the form of rainfall and snowfall. Winter temperatures can drop below 0 °F with wind chill factors below −10 °F. Precipitation runoff from the mountain drains into Glacier Bay Basin.

== Gallery ==
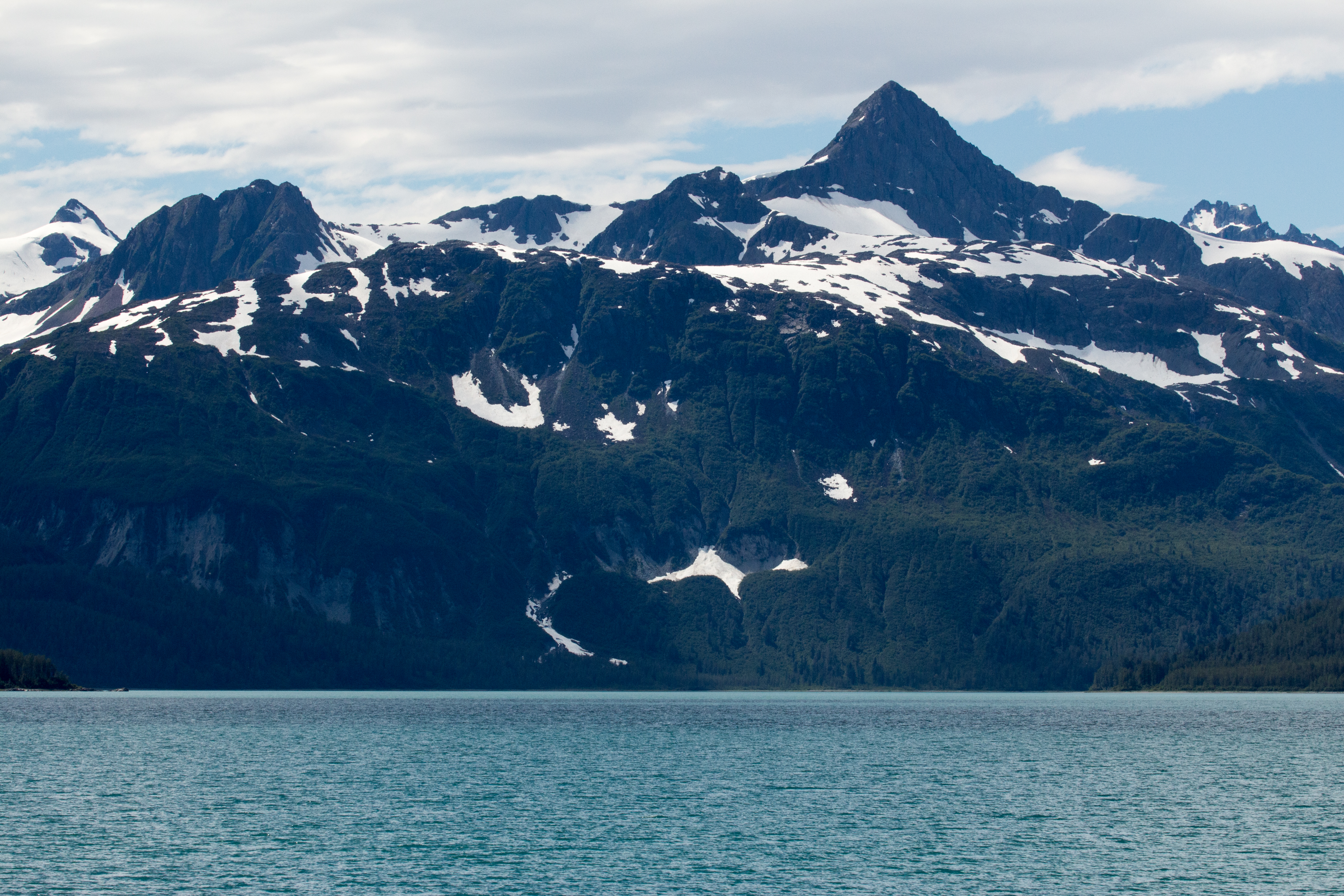
Blackthorn Peak from Geikie Inlet, with Contact Peak to left

== See also ==
- List of mountain peaks of Alaska
- Geography of Alaska
