= Marble Creek (Mississippi River tributary) =

Stream in Ralls County, Missouri, U.S.

Coordinates: 39.675046°N 91.302924°W

Marble Creek is a stream in Ralls County in the U.S. state of Missouri. It is a tributary of the Mississippi River.

The name Marble Creek appears to be a misnomer as there are no known deposits of marble along its course.

== See also ==
- List of rivers of Missouri
