= Ngũ Hành Sơn =

Group of mountains near Da Nang, Vietnam

Coordinates: 16.00°N 108.26°E

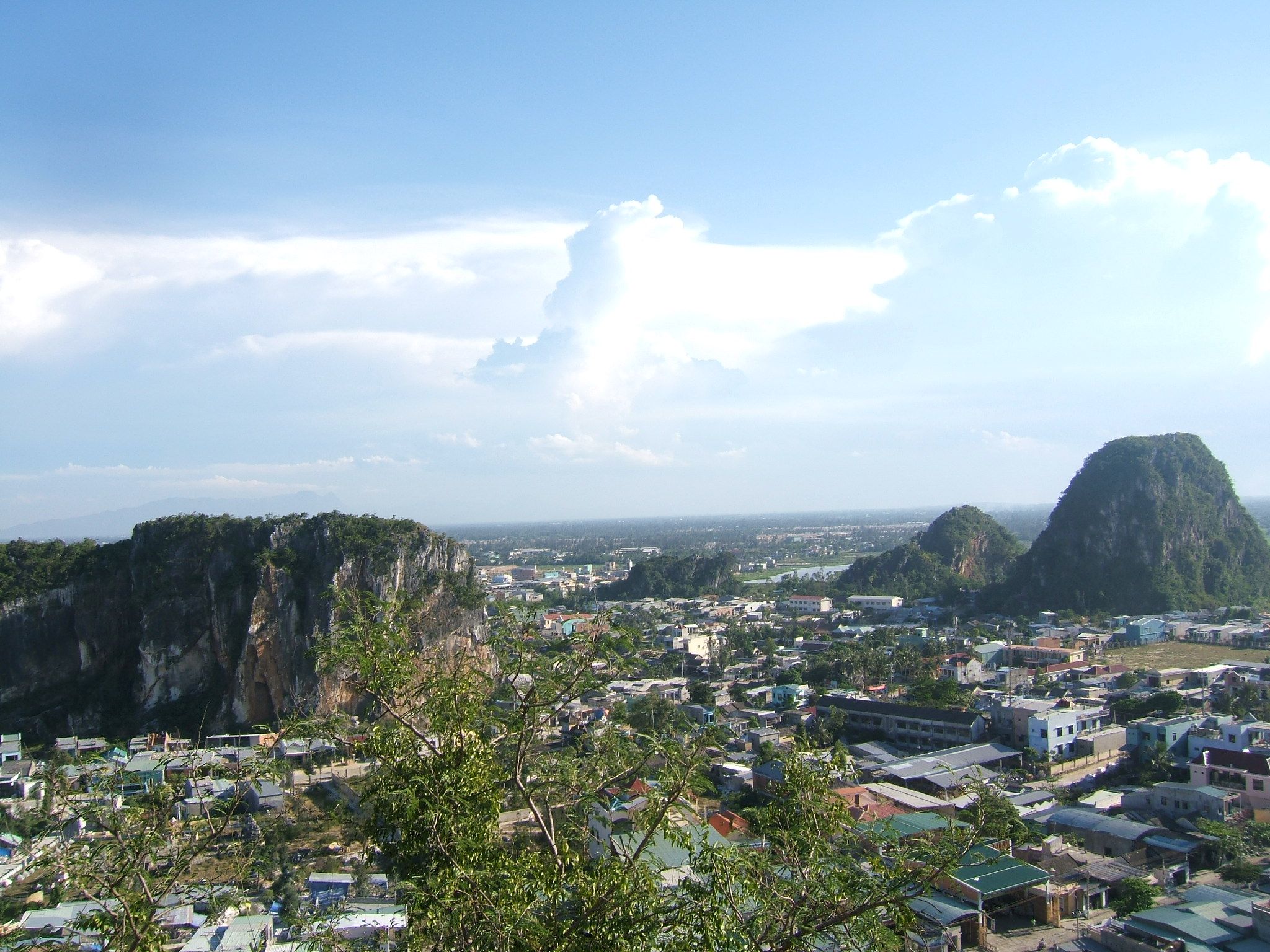
Mộc Sơn (left), Hỏa Sơn (right), and Kim Sơn (far right) as seen from Thủy Sơn peak

The Ngũ Hành Sơn (Vietnamese: Ngũ Hành Sơn, Chữ Hán: 五行山; lit. "five elements mountains"), also known in English as the Marble Mountains, are a cluster of five marble and limestone hills located in Ngũ Hành Sơn District, south of Da Nang city in Vietnam. The five mountains are named after the five elements: Kim (metal), Thủy (water), Mộc (wood), Hỏa (fire) and Thổ (earth).

All of the mountains have cave entrances and numerous tunnels, and it is possible to climb to the summit of Mount Thủy. There are everal Buddhist sanctuaries cwithin the mountains, making this a tourist destination.

The area is known for stone sculpture making and stone-cutting crafts. Direct rock extraction from the mountains was banned recently. Materials are now being transported from quarries in Quảng Nam Province.

Marble Mountains was officially given the National Special Relic certificate by the Ministry of Culture, Sports and Tourism on 20 January 2019.

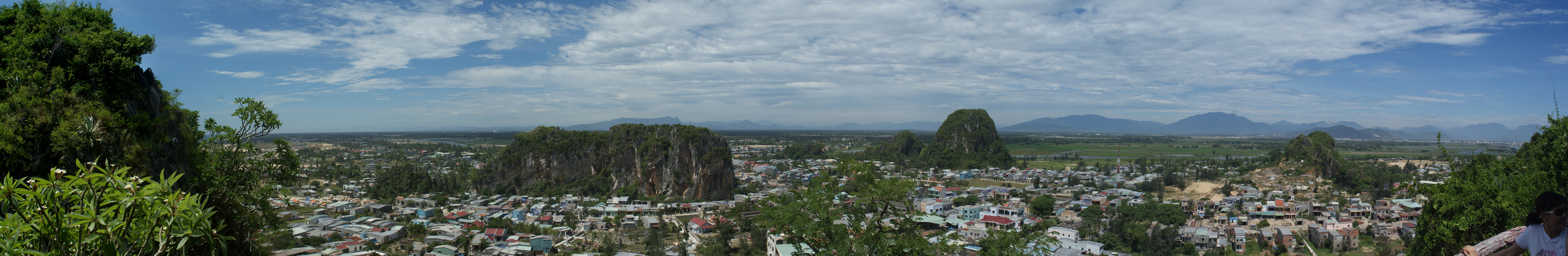
View from on top of Mount Thủy

== Vietnam War ==
The mountains were very near the American Marble Mountain Air Facility during the Vietnam War. According to William Broyles Jr., the Marble Mountains contained a hospital for the Vietcong, probably within earshot of the American air field and Da Nang Beach (which bordered the air field on the side opposite the mountains). He describes the enemy as having been so "certain of our ignorance [...] that he had hidden his hospital in plain sight".

== Buddhist and Hindu grottoes ==
The Marble Mountains are home to several Buddhist and Hindu grottoes. A stairway of 156 steps leads to the summit of Thuy Son, the only Marble Mountain accessible to visitors. It allows a wide panoramic view of the surrounding area and the other marble mountains. There are a number of grottoes, including Huyen Khong and Tang Chon, and many Hindu and Buddhist sanctuaries, the temples of Tam Thai, Tu Tam and Linh Ung, and the pagoda of Pho Dong. The sanctuaries feature statues and relief depictions of religious scenes carved out of the marble.

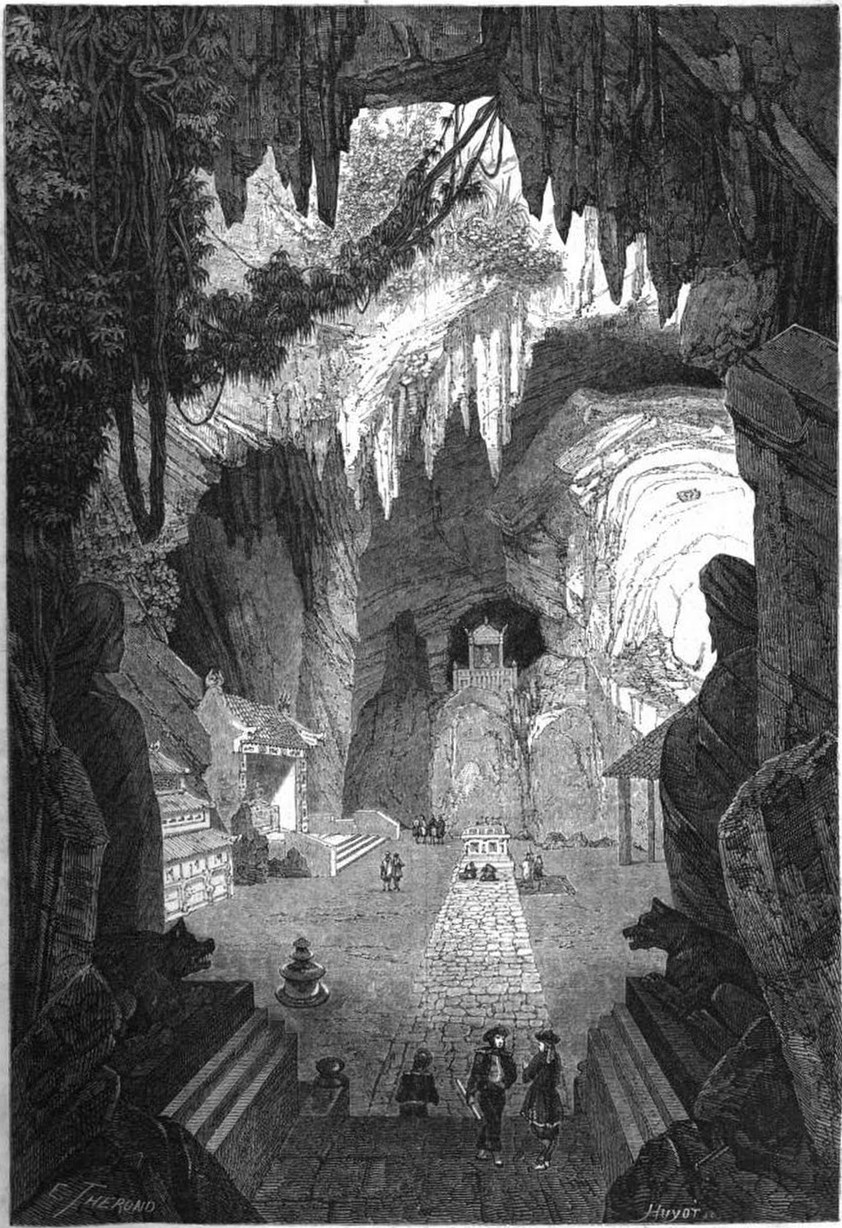
The cave and its small grotto-temples in 1860. Lithograph by Émile Therond.

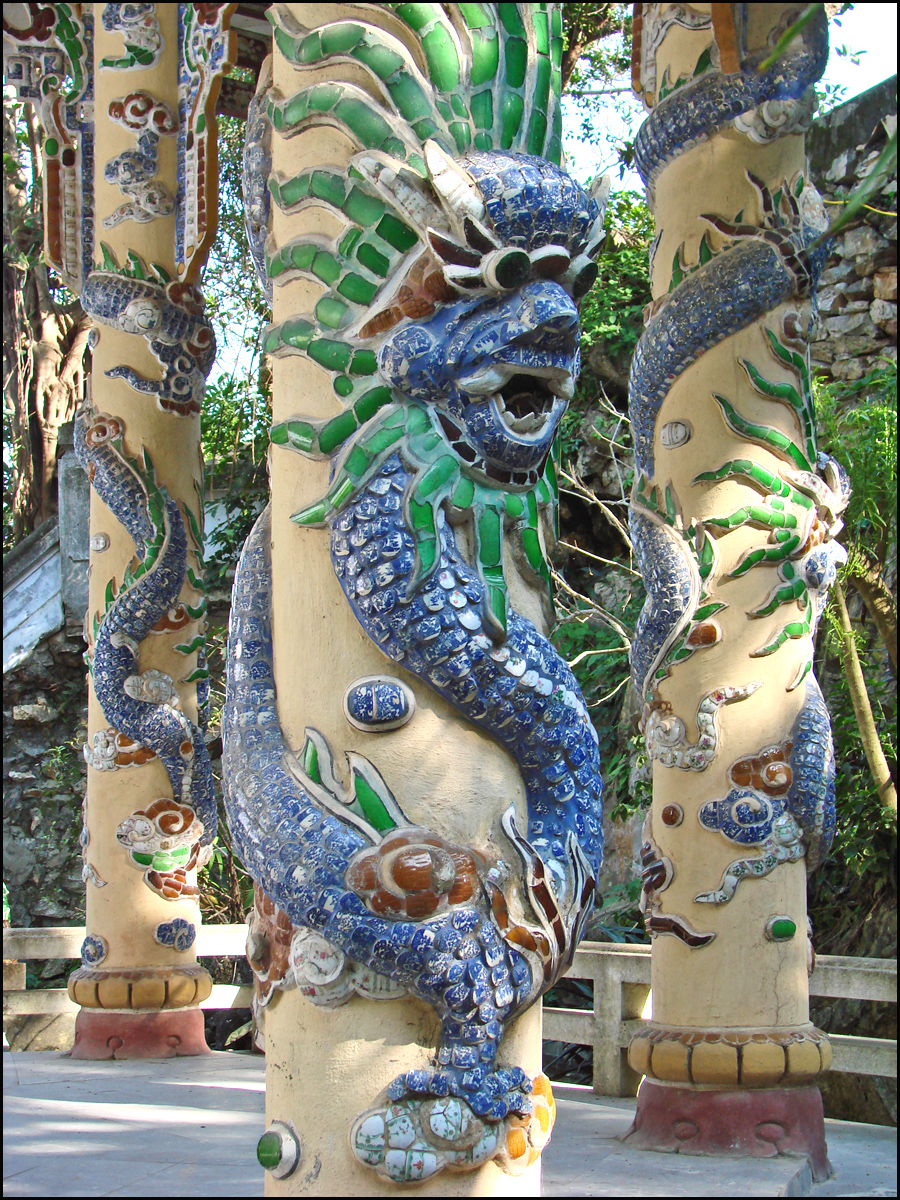
Mosaic dragon decorating a pillar at Thuy Son, at the Marble Mountains

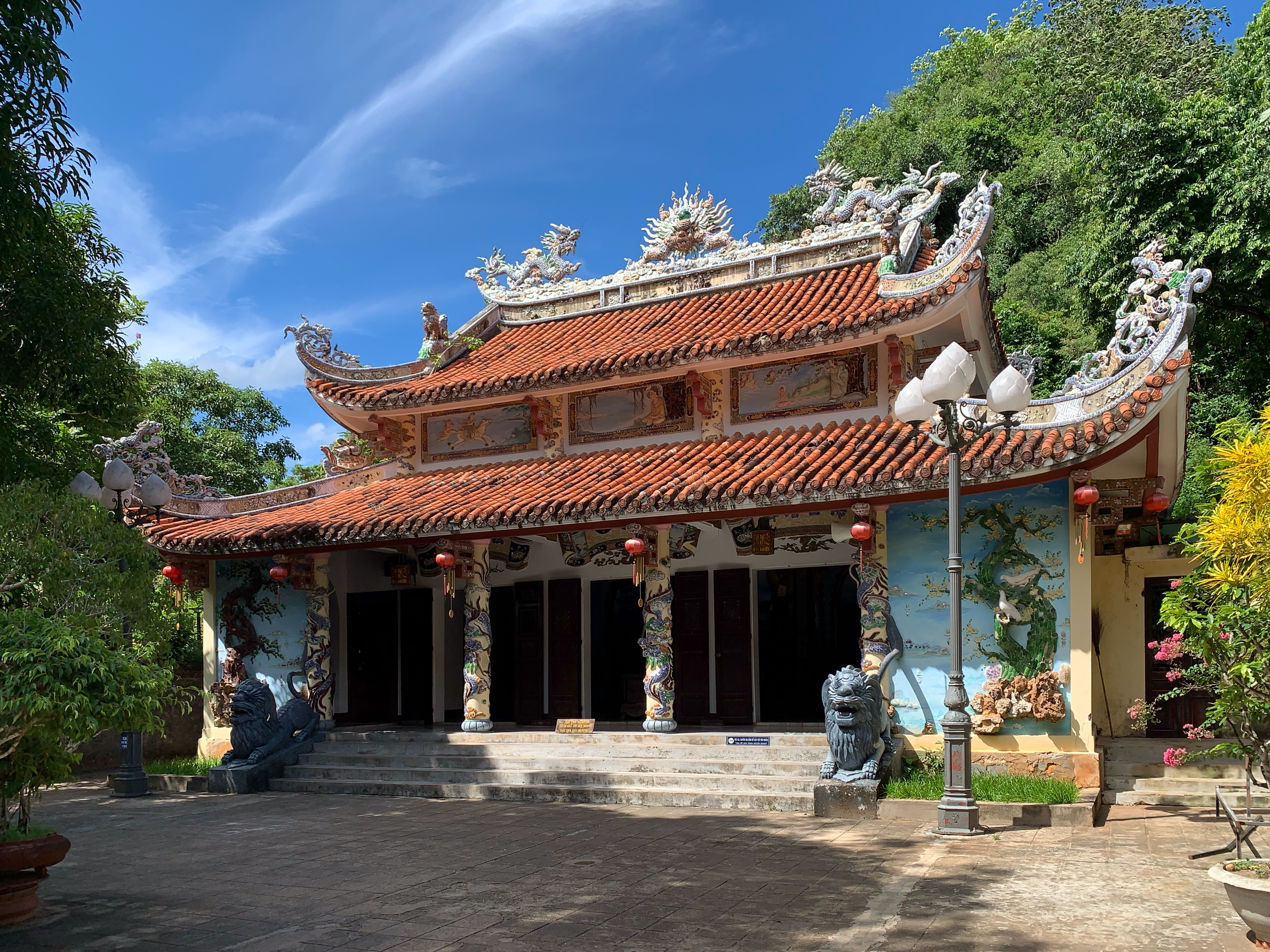
Tam Thai Pagoda

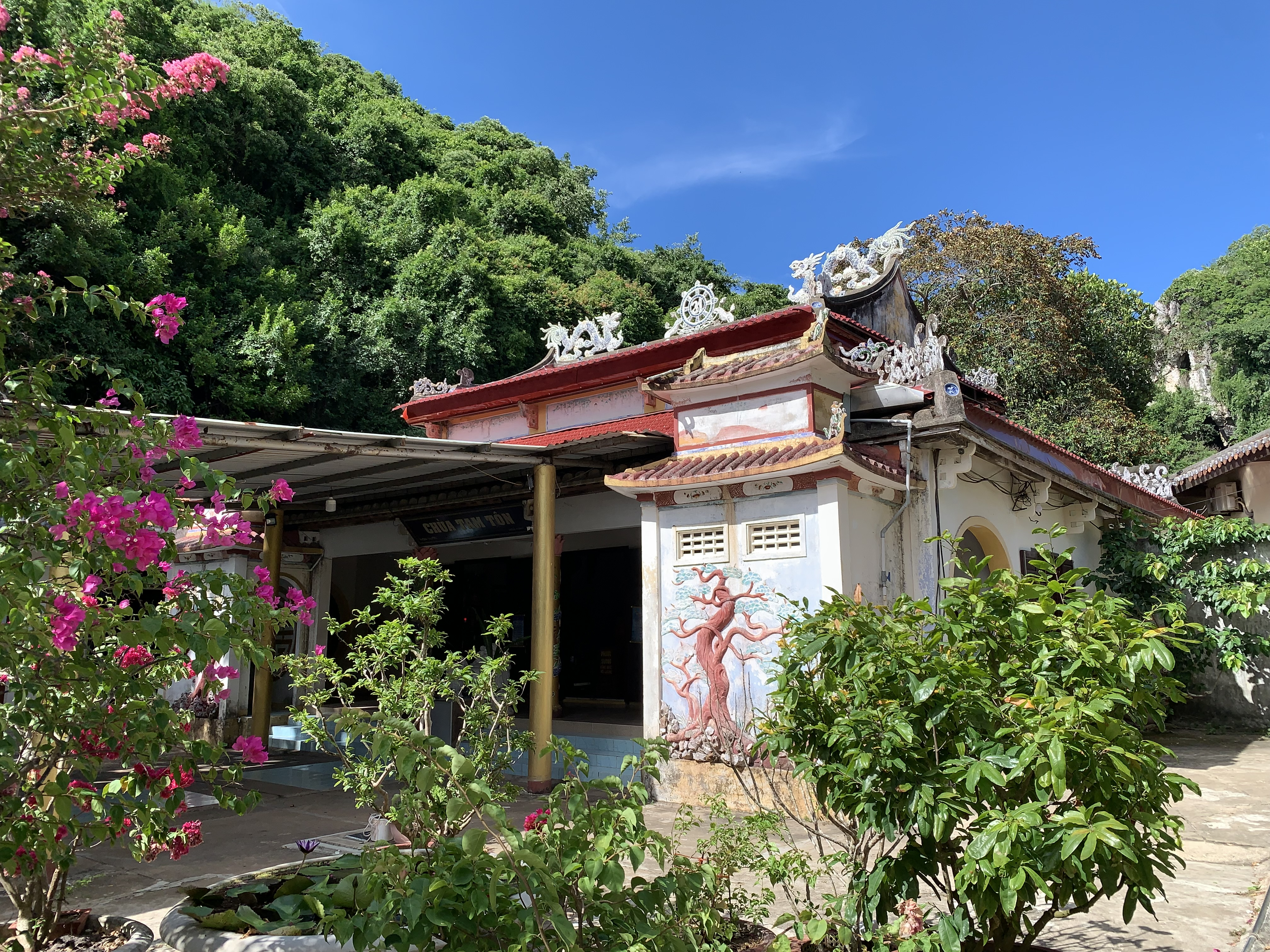
Tam Tôn Pagoda

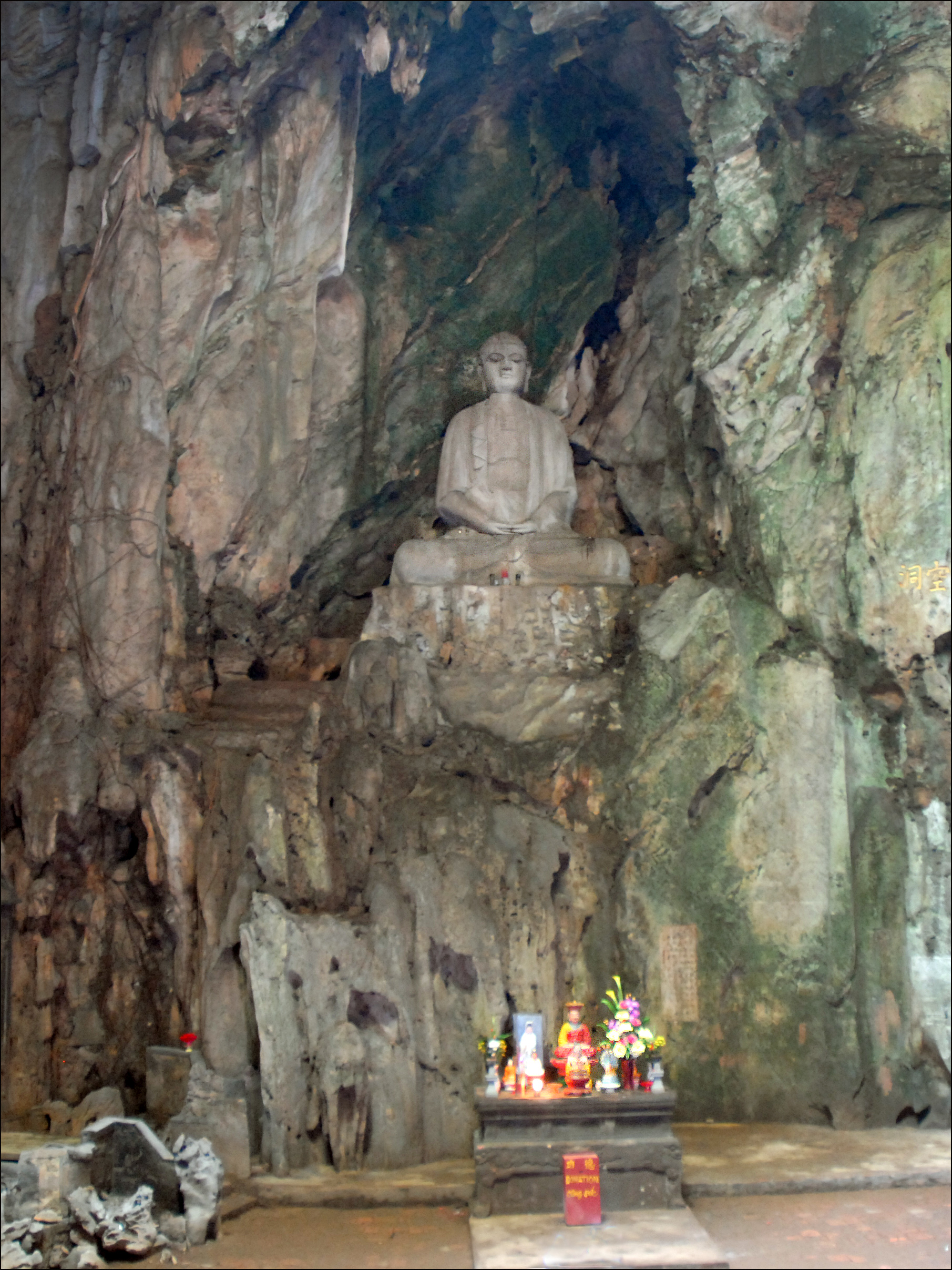
Huyen Khong Buddhist grotto carved into the Marble Mountains

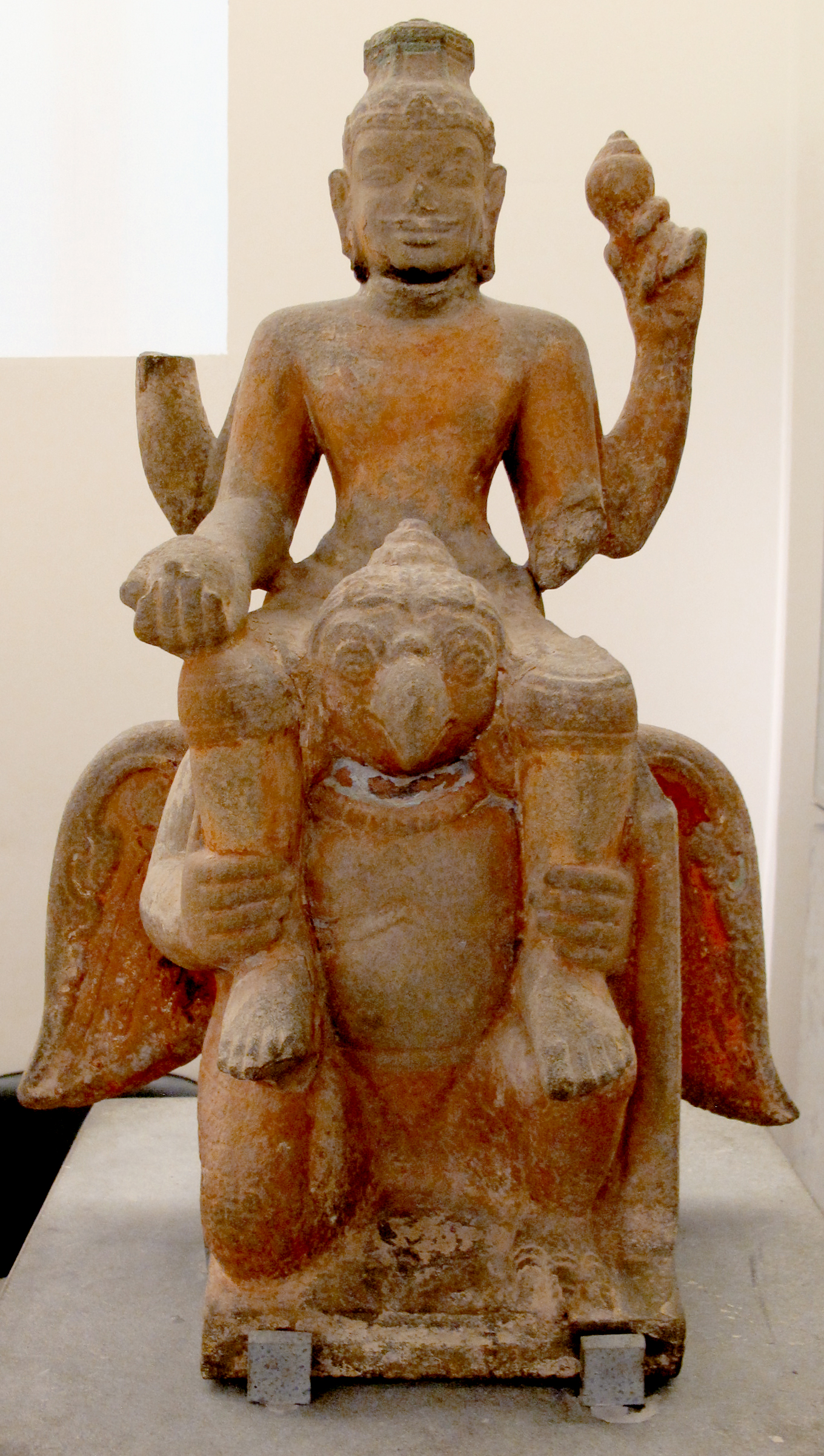
Vishnu on Garuda, Champa sculpture found in Ngu Hanh Son

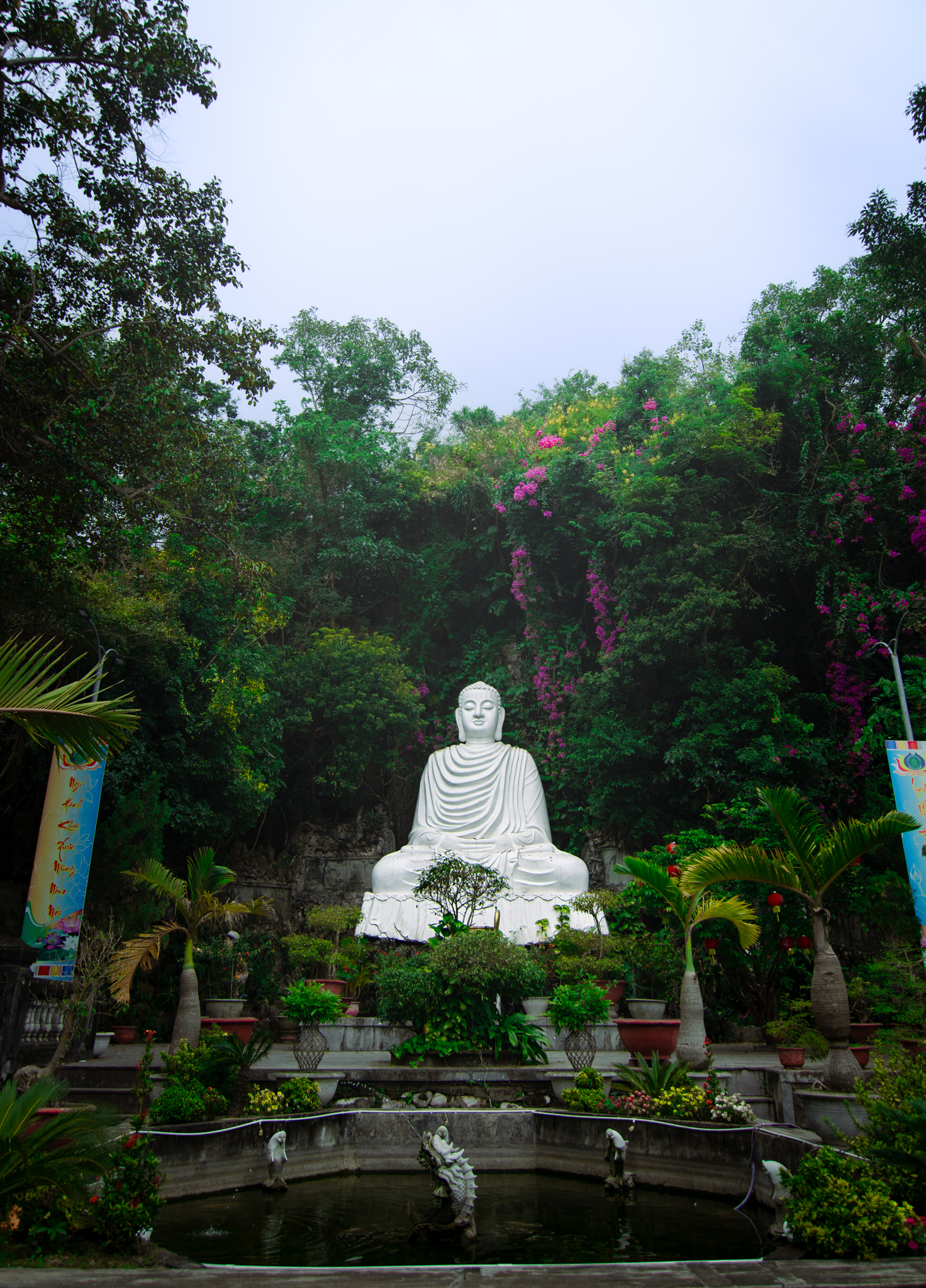
Buddha Statue in Marble Mountain
