= Mount Turner (Fairweather Range) =

Mountain on the Canada-U.S. border

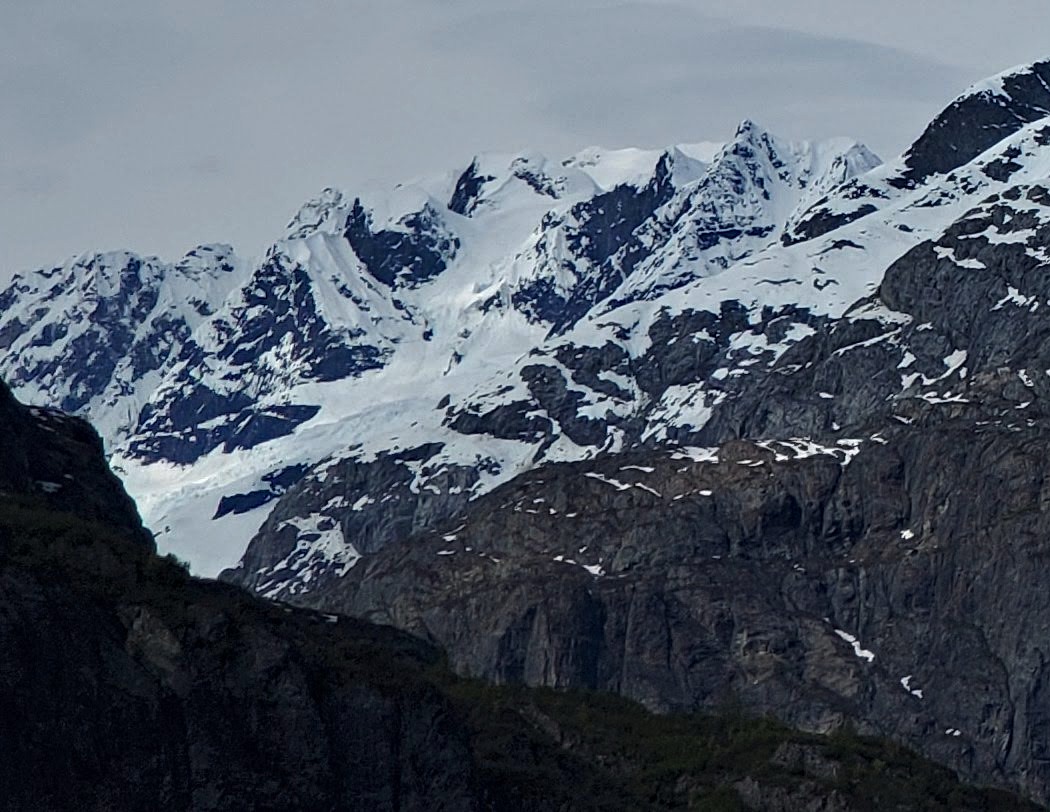
- Mount Turner

Highest point
- Elevation: 8,661 ft (2,640 m)
- Prominence: 2,083 ft (635 m)
- Parent peak: Mount Root (12,887 ft)
- Listing: Mountains of British Columbia
- Coordinates: 58°59′59″N 137°16′57″W

Naming
- Etymology: George Turner

Geography
- Location within Alaska Location within British Columbia
- Interactive map of Mount Turner
- Location: Hoonah-Angoon; Alaska, United States; Cassiar Land District; British Columbia, Canada
- Parent range: Fairweather Range; Saint Elias Mountains
- Topo map(s): USGS Skagway A-7; NTS 114P3 Grand Pacific Glacier

Climbing
- Easiest route: Mountaineering East face

Mount Turner, also known as Boundary Peak 162, is an 8,661+ foot (2,640+ meter) glaciated mountain summit located in the Fairweather Range of the Saint Elias Mountains, on the Canada–United States border between southeast Alaska and British Columbia. The peak is situated on the shared boundary of Glacier Bay National Park with Tatshenshini-Alsek Provincial Park, 8 mi (13 km) west of Tarr Inlet, and 4.4 mi (7 km) southwest of Mount Forde, which is the nearest peak. Turner is the highest point on the divide which separates Ferris Glacier from Margerie Glacier. The mountain's name was officially adopted by the Geographical Names Board of Canada on March 31, 1924. The mountain was named for George Turner (1850–1932), one of the US members of the 1903 Alaska Boundary Tribunal.

== Climate ==
Based on the Köppen climate classification, Mount Turner has a subarctic climate with cold, snowy winters, and mild summers. Weather systems coming off the Gulf of Alaska are forced upwards by the mountains (orographic lift), causing heavy precipitation in the form of rainfall and snowfall. Winter temperatures can drop below −20 °C with wind chill factors below −30 °C. This climate supports small hanging glaciers on its slopes as well as the larger Margerie Glacier to the south and Ferris Glacier to the north. Precipitation runoff and meltwater from its glaciers drains into Glacier Bay Basin.

== Gallery ==
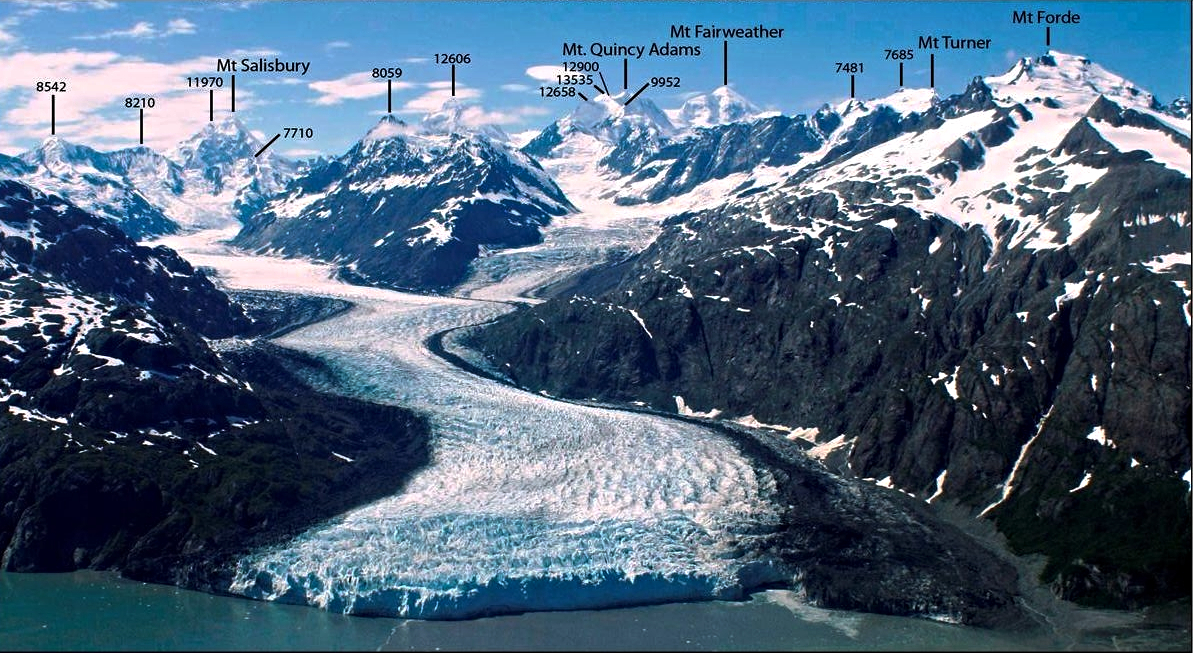
Margerie Glacier with Mount Turner labelled

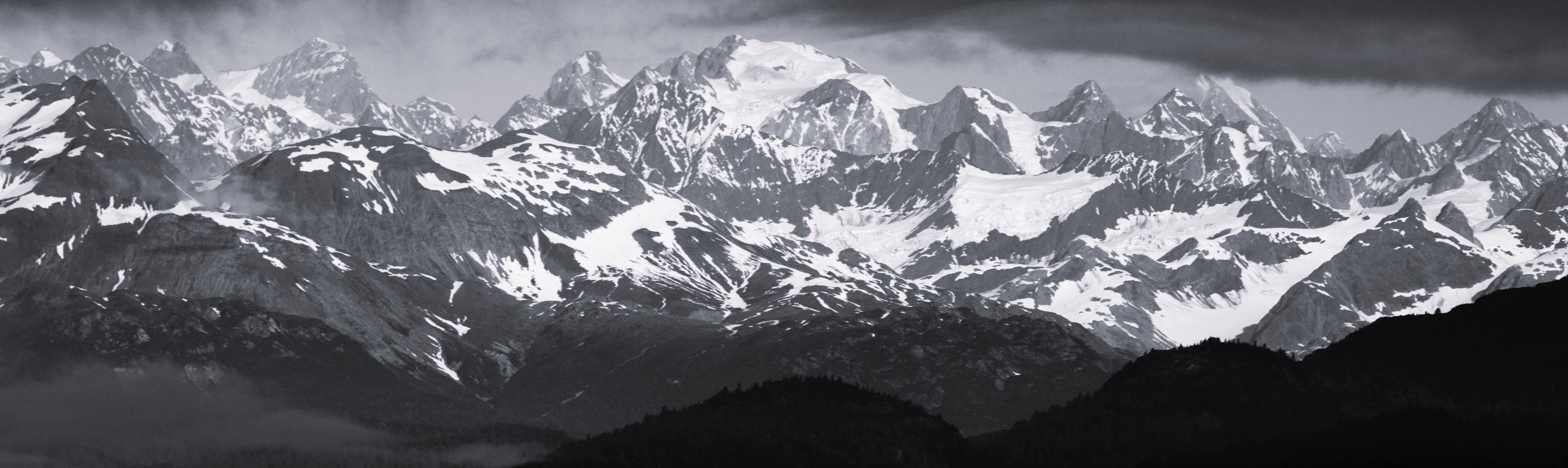
Mount Turner centered on skyline. East-southeast aspect.

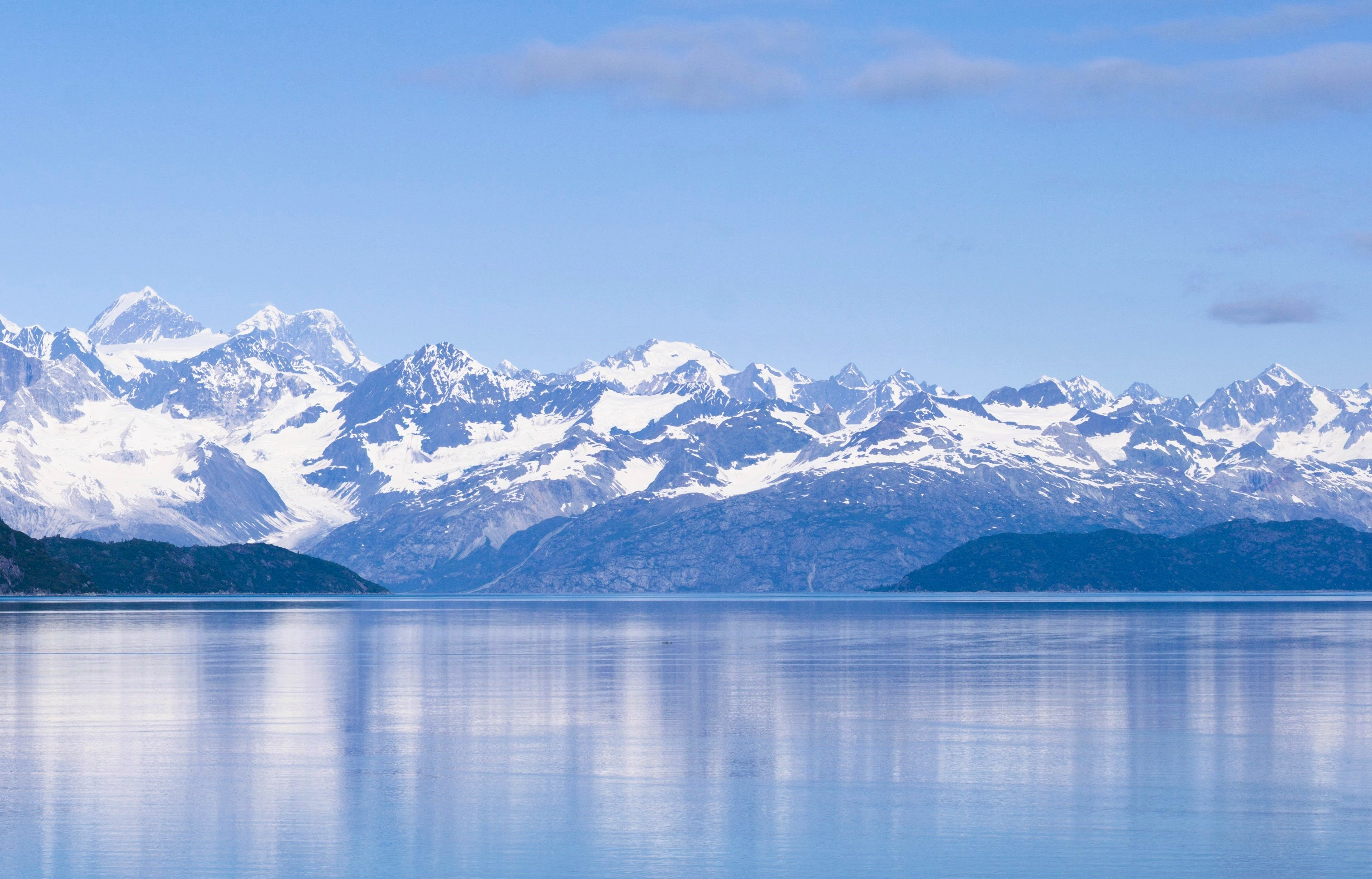
View from Glacier Bay, Mt. Turner centered on skyline with Mt. Root to left.

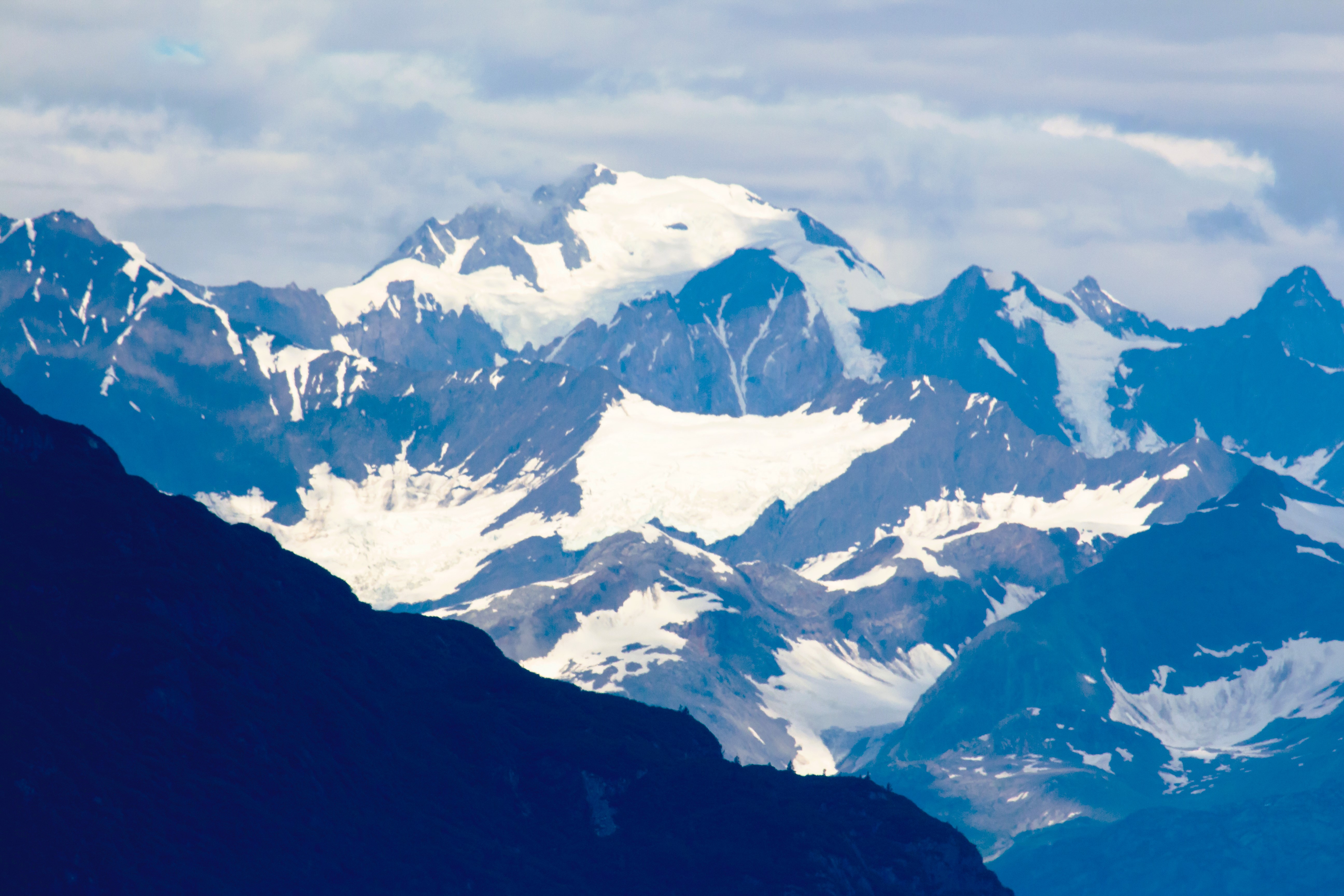
Mt. Turner centered on skyline

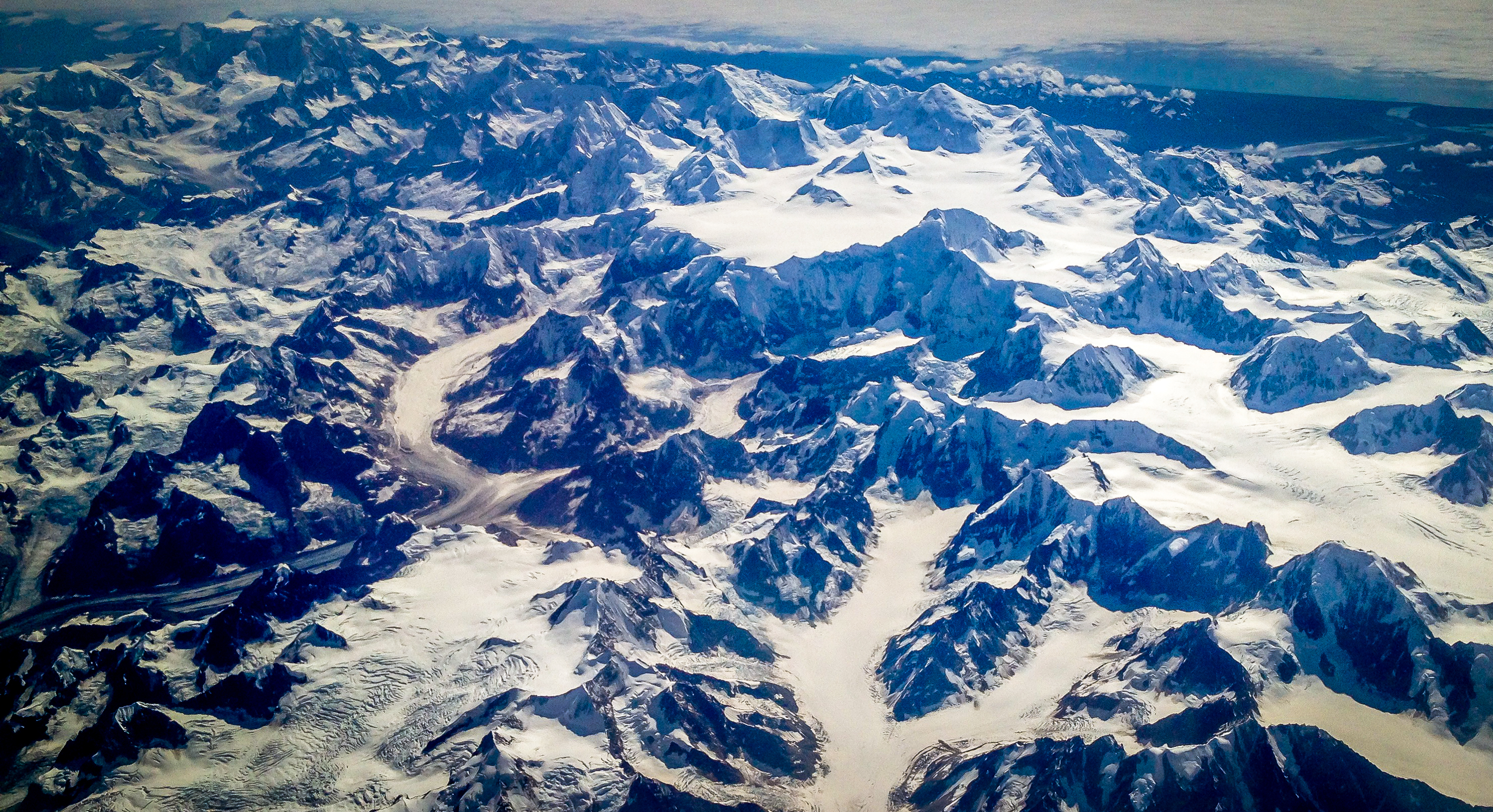
Airliner view of Fairweather Range with Mt. Turner to left (see file annotation)

== See also ==
- List of Boundary Peaks of the Alaska–British Columbia/Yukon border
- Geography of Alaska
- Geography of British Columbia
