= Mount Forde (Fairweather Range) =

Mountain on the United States-Canada border

- Boundary Peak 161
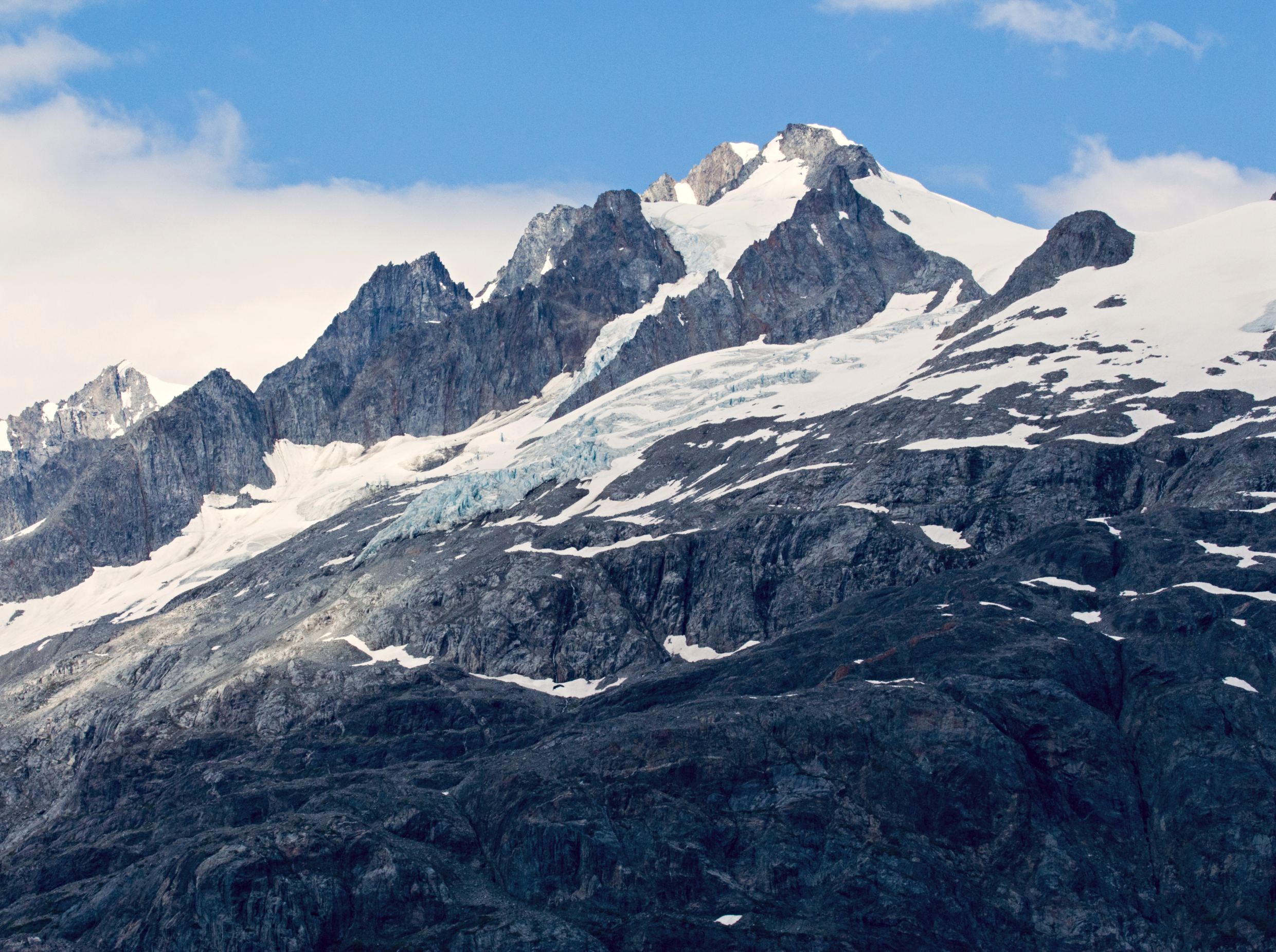
- Mount Forde, east aspect from Tarr Inlet

Highest point
- Elevation: 6,883 ft (2,098 m)
- Prominence: 1,010 ft (310 m)
- Parent peak: Mount Turner (8661+ ft)
- Listing: Mountains of British Columbia
- Coordinates: 59°01′56″N 137°10′33″W

Geography
- Location within Alaska Location within British Columbia Location within Canada
- Interactive map of Mount Forde
- Location: Hoonah-Angoon; Alaska, United States; Cassiar Land District; British Columbia, Canada
- Parent range: Fairweather Range; Saint Elias Mountains
- Topo map(s): USGS Skagway A-6; NTS 114P3 Grand Pacific Glacier

Climbing
- Easiest route: Scrambling East ridge

Mount Forde, also known as Boundary Peak 161, is a 6,883-foot (2,098 m) mountain summit located in the Fairweather Range of the Saint Elias Mountains, on the Canada–United States border between southeast Alaska and British Columbia. The peak is situated on the boundary of Glacier Bay National Park and Preserve, near the head of Tarr Inlet, 109 mi (175 km) northwest of Juneau, and 4.4 mi (7 km) northeast of Mount Turner, which is the nearest higher peak. Although modest in elevation, relief is significant since the mountain rises up from tidewater in less than four miles.

The mountain was named by the Geographical Names Board of Canada on December 4, 1928 for John Preston Forde, a surveyor and engineer with the Public Works Department of the Dominion of Canada, who visited Tarr Inlet in 1925 and 1928 to measure glacial recession. He was also the vice-president of the Alpine Club of Canada from 1910 through 1914, having made many ascents in the Canadian Rockies, Selkirk Mountains, and Coast Ranges. The mountain's name was officially approved by the United States Board on Geographic Names on January 9, 1929. Mount Forde can be seen from Tarr Inlet which is a popular destination for cruise ships. The months May through June offer the most favorable weather for viewing.

== Climate ==
Based on the Köppen climate classification, Mount Forde has a subarctic climate with cold, snowy winters, and mild summers. Temperatures can drop below −20 °C with wind chill factors below −30 °C. This climate supports small hanging glaciers on its slopes as well as the larger Margerie Glacier to the south and Ferris Glacier to the north. Precipitation runoff and meltwater from its glaciers drains into Glacier Bay Basin.

== Gallery ==
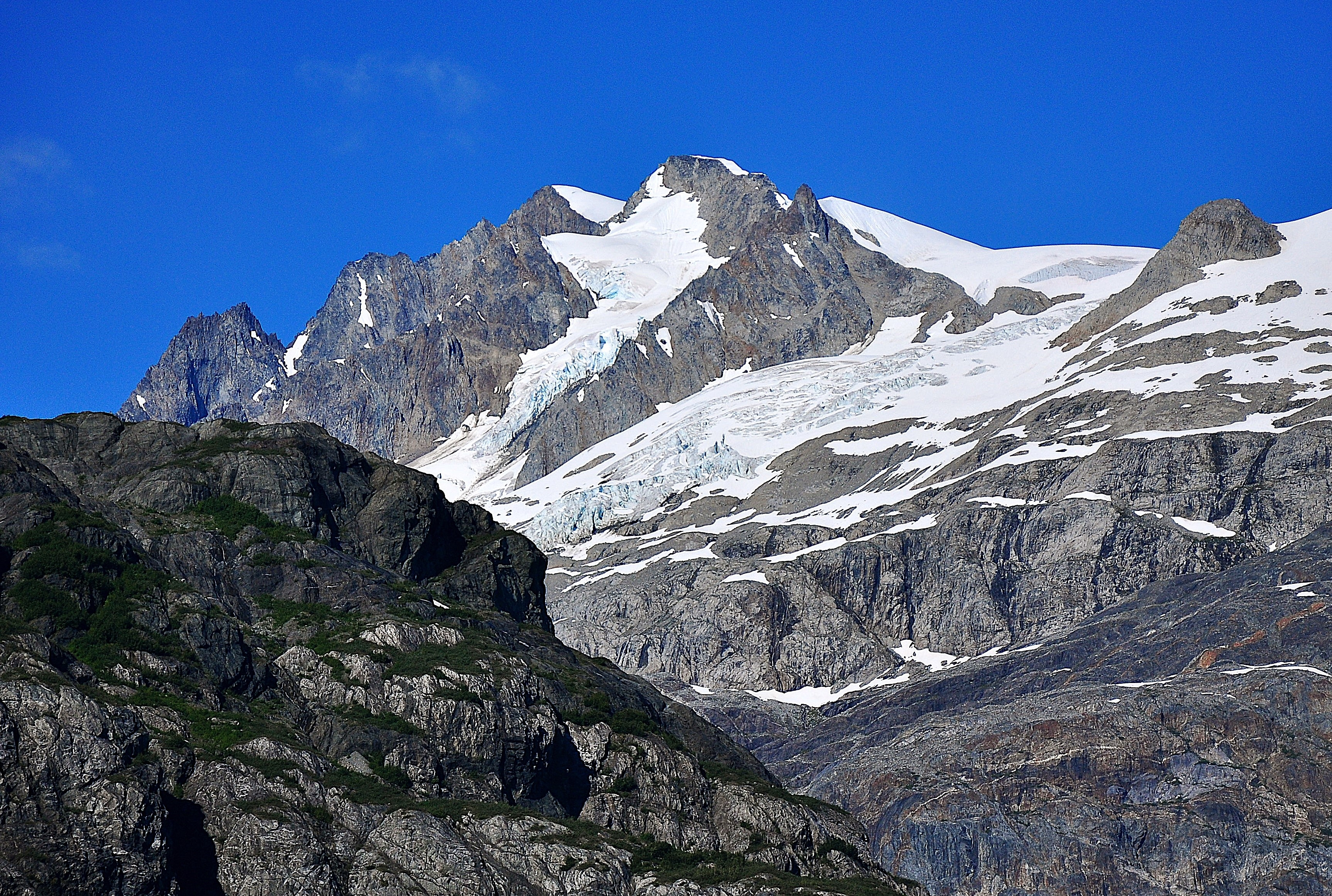
East aspect

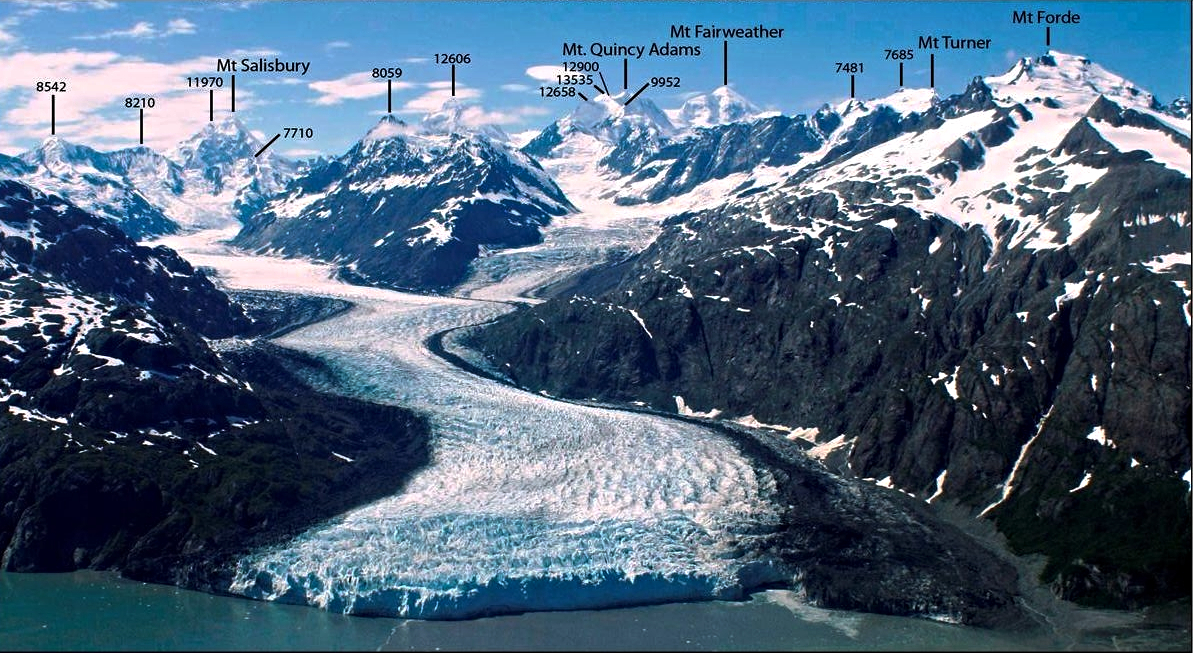
Margerie Glacier with Mount Forde

== See also ==
- List of Boundary Peaks of the Alaska–British Columbia/Yukon border
- Geography of Alaska
- Geography of British Columbia
