= List of Boundary Peaks of the Alaska–British Columbia/Yukon border =

This is a list of Boundary Peaks of the Alaska–British Columbia border, including those on the Alaska–Yukon border, being those peaks named as border-points of the Canada–United States border as a result of the Alaska Boundary Settlement of 1903 and associated later surveys.

Brass or concrete survey markers were placed on the summits of the "accessible" peaks designated in the treaty, positioned such that from any one marker a surveyor could see both the previous and the next markers along the boundary line. This was done so that if ever a question arose about jurisdiction anywhere along the border, a determination could be made by sighting between two markers.

Other peaks named in the treaty but not in the numbered-peak series include T Mountain, in the Stikine Icecap area (57°12′41″N 132°14′54″W). Other peaks on the boundary but not named in the treaty include an unnumbered Boundary Peak in the Icefield Ranges immediately north of the Alsek River (59°50′33″N 138°41′29″W) and Mount Vern Ritchie, to the north of there. Mountain passes on the boundary are few, the most important being Grand Pacific, Chilkat, Chilkoot and White Passes.

== List of peaks by number ==
Much of Alaska is included in one of the state's boroughs, and the remainder of the state is divided into census areas. In the third column, boroughs are marked with daggers† and census areas are marked with asterisks*.

Name	Alternate Name(s)	Borough/ Census Area	Elev.	Coordinates	USGS GNIS	BCGNIS	CGNDB	Other sites	Comments
Boundary Peak 8	Mount Welker	Ketchikan Gateway†	5,151 ft 1,570 m	56°00′30″N 130°00′13″W					AK-BC; named "After Captain Philip A. Welker, retired, who bore a distinguished part in the survey of Alaska and its boundary"
Boundary Peak 15	Mount Bayard, originally Mount Lindeborg	Ketchikan Gateway†	6,558 ft 1,999 m	56°07′22″N 130°06′14″W					AK-BC; named after Thomas F. Bayard (1828–1898), U.S. statesman and diplomat; original name after Dan Lindeborg, founder of Hyder, Alaska; Mt Lindeborg now refers to another summit in the vicinity.
Boundary Peak 16	Mount Jefferson Coolidge	Ketchikan Gateway†	6,319 ft 1,926 m	56°05′49″N 130°14′45″W					AK-BC
Boundary Peak 17	Mount Upshur	Ketchikan Gateway†	6,732 ft 2,052 m	56°07′45″N 130°20′56″W					AK-BC; named after Abel P. Upshur (1790–1844), US politician and jurist
Boundary Peak 18	Mount John Jay	Ketchikan Gateway†	6,896 ft 2,102 m	56°08′31″N 130°25′31″W					AK-BC; named after John Jay (1745–1820), U.S. statesman and jurist
Boundary Peak 23	Mount Willibert	Ketchikan Gateway†	7,041 ft 2,146 m	56°14′36″N 130°28′04″W					AK-BC; named after Willibert Simpson, member of staff of Canadian section of the International Boundary Commission, 1893–95
Boundary Peak 24	Mount Blaine	Ketchikan Gateway†	5,873 ft 1,790 m	56°14′51″N 130°30′00″W					AK-BC; named after James Gillespie Blaine (1830–93), American orator and statesman
Boundary Peak 27	Mount Middleton	Ketchikan Gateway†	5,469 ft 1,667 m	56°16′10″N 130°36′53″W					AK-BC; named after Henry Middleton (1771–1846), United States Minister to Russia, 1820–1830; negotiated the treaty of 1824 with Russia
Boundary Peak 40	Mount Stoeckl	Ketchikan Gateway†	5,997 ft 1,828 m	56°22′02″N 130°46′54″W					AK-BC; named after Russian Privy Councillor Baron Edward de Stoeckl, Russian Minister to the U.S., who signed the convention ceding Alaska to the United States of America on 30 March 1867.
Boundary Peak 41	Mosheim Dome	Ketchikan Gateway†	6,417 ft 1,956 m	56°22′27″N 130°48′59″W					AK-BC; named after Adolph Mosheim, an assistant surveyor with the United States party to the boundary survey in this area, 1905
Boundary Peak 47	Mount Lewis Cass	Ketchikan Gateway†	6,030 ft 1,840 m	56°24′42″N 131°05′07″W					AK-BC; named after Lewis Cass (1782–1866), U. S. soldier and statesman
Boundary Peak 48	Mount Pounder	Petersburg†	6,512 ft 1,985 m	56°26′59″N 131°10′25″W					AK-BC; named after John A. Pounder, surveyor with the International Boundary Commission, 1909
Boundary Peak 53	Mount Fawcett	Wrangell†	6,214 ft 1,894 m	56°33′11″N 131°28′07″W					AK-BC; named after Thomas Fawcett, DTS, engineer with the Canadian section of the International Boundary Commission, 1911–20
Boundary Peak 54	Mount Whipple	Wrangell†	5,233 ft 1,595 m	56°36′46″N 131°34′44″W					AK-BC
Boundary Peak 62	Mount Cote	Wrangell†	4,377 ft 1,334 m	56°45′14″N 131°53′56″W					AK-BC; named after Jean Leon Côté (1867–1924), Departmental Land Surveyor who worked on preliminary boundary surveys in the 1890s; later Alberta MLA and member of the Senate of Canada, 1924. Also commemorated by Mount Côté on the BC–Alberta boundary in the Canadian Rockies
Boundary Peak 66	Elbow Mountain	Wrangell†	4,245 ft 1,294 m	56°42′11″N 131°51′39″W					AK-BC
Boundary Peak 67	Mount Gallatin	Wrangell†	5,098 ft 1,554 m	56°45′16″N 131°54′05″W					AK-BC; named after Albert Gallatin, one of the US commissioners who negotiated the Treaty of Ghent
Boundary Peak 68	Mount Talbot	Wrangell†	4,452 ft 1,357 m	56°48′22″N 131°52′24″W					AK-BC; Captain A.C. Talbot, international boundary surveyor, 1893 and 1895
Boundary Peak 69		Wrangell†	6,913 ft 2,107 m	56°52′27″N 132°07′23″W					AK-BC
Boundary Peak 70	Kates Needle	Petersburg†	10,016 ft 3,053 m	57°02′42″N 132°02′40″W					AK-BC
Boundary Peak 71	Devils Thumb	Petersburg†	8,560 ft 2,610 m	57°05′29″N 132°22′20″W					AK-BC
Boundary Peak 72		Petersburg†	7,533 ft 2,296 m	57°12′44″N 132°14′58″W					AK-BC
Boundary Peak 73		Hoonah-Angoon*	7,782 ft 2,372 m	57°20′59″N 132°22′07″W					AK-BC
Boundary Peak 74		Hoonah-Angoon*	6,289 ft 1,917 m	57°29′49″N 132°33′20″W					AK-BC
Boundary Peak 75		Hoonah-Angoon*	7,487 ft 2,282 m	57°37′01″N 132°39′35″W					AK-BC
Boundary Peak 76		Hoonah-Angoon*	7,073 ft 2,156 m	57°41′46″N 132°44′58″W					AK-BC
Boundary Peak 77		Hoonah-Angoon*	6,611 ft 2,015 m	57°50′21″N 132°52′15″W					AK-BC
Boundary Peak 78	Mount Hill	Hoonah-Angoon*	6,440 ft 1,960 m	58°00′01″N 133°04′04″W					AK-BC
Boundary Peak 79		Juneau†	5,279 ft 1,609 m	58°09′14″N 133°10′25″W					AK-BC
Boundary Peak 83		Juneau†	5,374 ft 1,638 m	58°13′38″N 133°16′12″W					AK-BC
Boundary Peak 84	Mount Brundage	Juneau†	5,902 ft 1,799 m	58°16′39″N 133°20′43″W					AK-BC
Boundary Peak 85		Juneau†	6,398 ft 1,950 m	58°23′18″N 133°27′40″W					AK-BC
Boundary Peak 86	Mount Ogden	Juneau†	7,126 ft 2,172 m	58°25′33″N 133°22′39″W					
Boundary Peak 93	Devils Paw	Juneau†	8,045 ft 2,452 m	58°43′46″N 133°50′17″W					AK-BC
Boundary Peak 95	Mount Ogilvie	Juneau†	7,218 ft 2,200 m	58°51′40″N 134°15′25″W					AK-BC
Boundary Peak 96		Juneau†	7,162 ft 2,183 m	58°54′06″N 134°18′29″W					AK-BC
Boundary Peak 97	Mount Bressler	Juneau†	7,503 ft 2,287 m	58°55′28″N 134°20′00″W					AK-BC
Boundary Peak 98	Mount Nesselrode	Haines†	7,244 ft 2,208 m	58°57′45″N 134°18′48″W					AK-BC
Boundary Peak 99		Haines†	7,224 ft 2,202 m	58°58′47″N 134°24′23″W					AK-BC
Boundary Peak 100		Haines†	6,509 ft 1,984 m	59°02′20″N 134°22′45″W					AK-BC
Boundary Peak 101		Haines†	7,536 ft 2,297 m	59°05′22″N 134°26′47″W					AK-BC
Boundary Peak 102		Haines†	7,237 ft 2,206 m	59°07′55″N 134°28′59″W					AK-BC
Boundary Peak 103		Haines†	6,526 ft 1,989 m	59°07′53″N 134°33′45″W					AK-BC
Boundary Peak 104	Mount Pullen	Haines†	5,663 ft 1,726 m	59°11′33″N 134°40′39″W					AK-BC
Boundary Peak 105	Mount Canning	Haines†	5,784 ft 1,763 m	59°14′59″N 134°42′04″W					AK-BC
Boundary Peak 106		Haines†	6,155 ft 1,876 m	59°16′53″N 134°57′27″W					AK-BC
Boundary Peak 107	Mount Bagot	Haines/Skagway	7,155 ft 2,181 m	59°20′54″N 135°01′29″W					AK-BC; named after Charles Bagot
Boundary Peak 108		Haines†	6,742 ft 2,055 m	59°23′15″N 134°59′21″W					AK-BC
Boundary Peak 109		Skagway†	6,069 ft 1,850 m	59°25′41″N 135°06′01″W					AK-BC
Boundary Peak 111		Skagway†	5,800 ft 1,800 m	59°28′30″N 135°01′34″W					AK-BC
Boundary Peak 144		Haines†	4,049 ft 1,234 m	59°27′54″N 136°18′24″W					AK-BC
Boundary Peak 150		Haines†	4,885 ft 1,489 m	59°27′57″N 136°28′29″W					AK-BC
Boundary Peak 151		Haines†	6,696 ft 2,041 m	59°22′37″N 136°28′33″W					AK-BC
Boundary Peak 154		Haines†	5,292 ft 1,613 m	59°17′04″N 136°28′00″W					AK-BC
Boundary Peak 155		Haines†	5,554 ft 1,693 m	59°16′30″N 136°29′39″W					AK-BC
Boundary Peak 156	Mount Harris	Haines†	5,289 ft 1,612 m	59°15′45″N 136°29′16″W					AK-BC
Boundary Peak 157		Hoonah-Angoon*	5,584 ft 1,702 m	59°09′59″N 136°34′58″W					AK-BC
Boundary Peak 158		Hoonah-Angoon*	5,430 ft 1,660 m	59°09′37″N 136°49′39″W					AK-BC
Boundary Peak 159		Hoonah-Angoon*	5,761 ft 1,756 m	59°08′10″N 136°52′26″W					AK-BC
Boundary Peak 160	Mount Barnard	Hoonah-Angoon*	8,173 ft 2,491 m	59°06′04″N 136°58′04″W					AK-BC
Boundary Peak 161	Mount Forde	Hoonah-Angoon*	6,883 ft 2,098 m	59°01′56″N 137°10′33″W					AK-BC
Boundary Peak 162	Mount Turner	Hoonah-Angoon*	8,661 ft 2,640 m	59°00′00″N 137°16′47″W					AK-BC
Boundary Peak 163	Mount Quincy Adams	Hoonah-Angoon*	13,146 ft 4,007 m	58°54′31″N 137°27′07″W					AK-BC
Boundary Peak 164	Mount Fairweather	Yakutat†	15,157 ft 4,620 m	58°54′25″N 137°31′37″W					AK-BC
Boundary Peak 165	Mount Root	Yakutat†	11,657 ft 3,553 m	58°59′11″N 137°30′07″W					AK-BC
Boundary Peak 166	Mount Lodge	Yakutat†	10,272 ft 3,131 m	59°06′25″N 137°32′29″W					AK-BC
Boundary Peak 167	Mount Hay	Yakutat†	8,284 ft 2,525 m	59°14′40″N 137°36′23″W					AK-BC
Boundary Peak 172	Mount Herbert	Yakutat†	5,128 ft 1,563 m	59°46′05″N 138°38′09″W					AK-BC
Boundary Peak 173		Yakutat†	5,118 ft 1,560 m	59°48′25″N 138°40′50″W					AK-BC
Boundary Peak 174	Mount Duff	Yakutat†	6,470 ft 1,970 m	59°54′18″N 138°43′17″W					AK-BC
Boundary Peak 175	Mount Armour	Yakutat†	6,834 ft 2,083 m	59°54′23″N 138°43′04″W					AK-BC; named after John Douglas Armour (1830–1903), Chief Justice of the High Court of Ontario, and Justice of the Supreme Court of Canada, one of the original Canadian members of the Alaskan Boundary Tribunal in 1903; succeeded after his death by A.B.Aylesworth (cf. Mount Aylesworth)
Boundary Peak 176	Mount Aylesworth	Yakutat†	7,926 ft 2,416 m	59°55′29″N 138°47′46″W					AK-BC; named after Sir Allen Bristol Aylesworth (1854–1952), Canadian constitutional lawyer and member of Alaskan Boundary Tribunal, 1903, succeeding J.D. Armour after his death; Canadian Minister of justice, 1906–11 and later Canadian Senator.
Boundary Peak 177	Mount Jetté	Yakutat†	7,966 ft 2,428 m	59°59′40″N 139°03′10″W					AK-BC
Boundary Peak 178	Mount Seattle	Yakutat†	9,482 ft 2,890 m	60°05′10″N 139°11′45″W					AK-YT
Boundary Peak 179	Mount Hubbard	Yakutat†	14,872 ft 4,533 m	60°19′07″N 139°04′17″W					AK-YT
Boundary Peak 180	Mount Alverstone	Yakutat†	13,904 ft 4,238 m	60°21′01″N 139°04′38″W					AK-YT
Boundary Peak 181	Mount Vancouver-Good Neighbor Peak	Yakutat†	15,013 ft 4,576 m	60°19′45″N 139°41′26″W					AK-YT
Boundary Peak 182	Mount Cook	Yakutat†	12,857 ft 3,919 m	60°10′39″N 139°58′55″W					AK-YT
Boundary Peak 183	Mount Augusta	Yakutat†	12,857 ft 3,919 m	60°18′11″N 140°27′21″W					AK-YT; named in 1891 by I.C. Russell of the USGS in honor of his wife Augusta Olmstead Russell
Boundary Peak 184		Yakutat†	4,665 ft 1,422 m	60°13′01″N 140°31′27″W					AK-YT
Boundary Peak 185		Yakutat†	9,777 ft 2,980 m	60°15′34″N 140°46′32″W					AK-YT
Boundary Peak 186	Mount Saint Elias	Yakutat†	18,035 ft 5,497 m	60°17′36″N 140°55′46″W					AK-YT
Boundary Peak 187		Yakutat†	13,071 ft 3,984 m	60°18′27″N 140°59′49″W					AK-YT; this is the westernmost point in Canada

== See also ==
- Alaska boundary dispute
- Boundary Ranges
- List of peaks on the Alberta–British Columbia border
