= Mount Duff (Yakutat) =

Mountain in Alaska and British Columbia

- Boundary Peak 174
- Location within Alaska Location within British Columbia Location within Canada
- Interactive map of Mount Duff

Highest point
- Elevation: 7,211 ft (2,198 m)
- Prominence: 945 ft (288 m)
- Coordinates: 59°50′41″N 138°40′46″W

Geography
- Location: Stikine Region, British Columbia; Glacier Bay National Park and Preserve, Alaska
- Topo map: NTS 114O15 Mount Aylesworth

Mount Duff, also named Boundary Peak 174, is a mountain in Alaska and British Columbia, located on the Canada–United States border, and part of the Southern Icefield Ranges of the Saint Elias Mountains. It was named in 1923 for Sir Lyman Poore Duff, (1865-1955), a junior counsel before the International Boundary Commission in 1903, and Judge of the Supreme Court of Canada.

== See also ==
- List of Boundary Peaks of the Alaska-British Columbia/Yukon border
