= R v Machekequonabe =

1897 Ontario court case

R v Machekequonabe (1897), 28 OR 309, 2 CCC 138, was a decision of the Divisional Court of the Supreme Court of Ontario.

Machekequonabe, the accused, was an Anishinaabe man who shot and killed someone he believed to be a wendigo. In fact, the man was his foster father.

Machekequonabe was convicted of manslaughter at first instance: the trial judge rejected his alleged defences of lack of mens rea and insanity. However, Machekequonabe was acquitted of murder because the Crown was unable to prove that Machekequonabe intended to kill his foster father.

On appeal, Chief Justice John Douglas Armour held for the court that Machekequonabe was guilty of manslaughter despite not being aware that the common law existed. Machekequonabe, the only reported case in which an accused person killed an alleged wendigo, became a precedent for the proposition that "Indigenous peoples were bound by colonial law regardless of their religious and cultural beliefs".
