= Prow Knob =

Island in Alaska, U.S.

Coordinates: 59°11′44.9″N 138°0′13.6″W

Prow Knob is a lake island near the eastern shore of Alsek Lake in the Alaska panhandle, at the north end of Glacier Bay National Park, about 260 miles (420 km) northwest of Juneau.

Although it long existed as a small geographical prominence (a glacial nunatak), it only became an island in 2025 (sometime between July 13 and August 6), when it became surrounded by water.

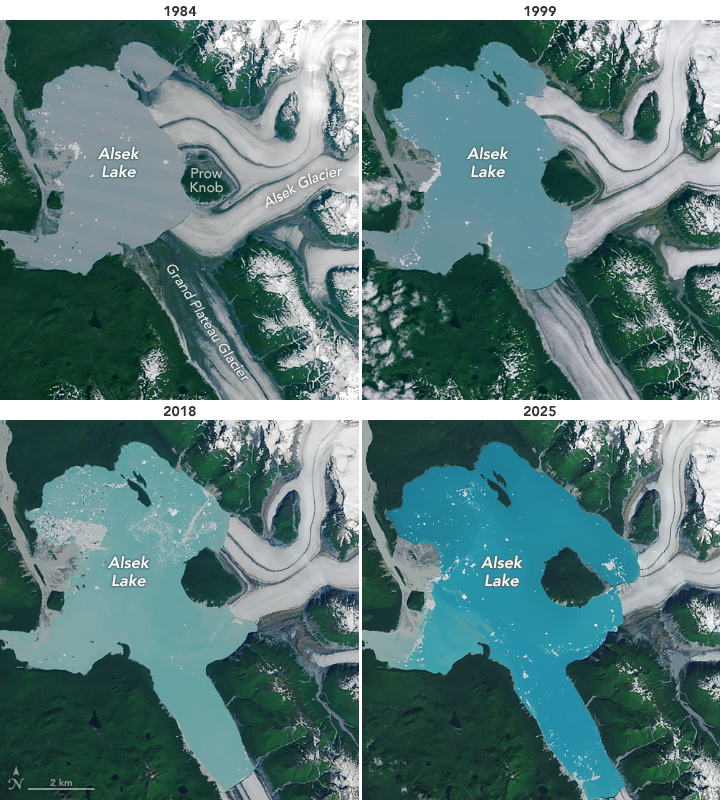
Four satellite images showing retreat of Alsek glacier in Alaska from 1984 to 2025. Prow Knob is the large landform just right of center.

Previously, Prow Knob had been entirely surrounded by Alsek Glacier which connected to land, and so was not considered an island. According to Mauri S. Pelto, Alsek Glacier had reached all the way to Gateway Knob, about 3 miles (4.8 km) west of Prow Knob, in the early 20th Century. Gateway Knob is on the far side of what is now Alsek Lake.

Over time, Alsek Glacier retreated, due to global warming. By the early 1980s, Prow Knob touched open water, and later only an isthmus of ice connected Prow Knob to the glacier. The isthmus finally dissolved in 2025 so that Prow Knob became entirely surrounded by the waters of Alsek Lake.

The island covers about 4 square miles (10.4 km^{2}), with its highest point being about 1,000 metres (3,300 ft). There are no inhabitants, buildings, or improvements, and the nearest settlement is 20 miles (32 km) away.

Austin Post named the landform Prow Knob in 1960, on account of its resemblance to a ship's prow.
