= Daniel Fox =

Daniel Fox may refer to:

- Daniel Fox (chemist) (1927–1989), American polymer chemist
- Daniel Fox (field hockey) (born 1983), British field hockey player
- Daniel Fox (swimmer) (born 1994), Australian Paralympic swimmer
- Danny Fox (born 1986), British footballer
- Danny Fox (artist), British artist
- Daniel M. Fox (1809–1890), mayor of Philadelphia, Pennsylvania from 1869 to 1872
- Daniel Fox (Lil' Dan), percussionist for Mushroomhead & drummer and bassist for Dope
- Dan Fox (American football) (born 1991), American football linebacker
- Daniel Fox, a contestant in series 6 of the British TV series The X Factor
- Daniel J. Fox, Connecticut state representative
- Daniel Fox, artist who created the Mr. Monopoly mascot character

== See also ==
- Daniel Fox Sandford (1831–1906), bishop of Tasmania, 1883–1889
- Mount Dan Fox, a mountain in Alaska
