= Mount Herbert =

Mount Herbert may refer to:

- Mount Herbert, a town in Lot 48, Prince Edward Island, Canada
- Mount Herbert (Canterbury), a mountain in the South Island of New Zealand
- Mount Herbert (New Zealand electorate), a former New Zealand parliamentary electorate based around the same mountain
- Mount Herbert, a mountain in the Bismarck Range of Papua New Guinea
- Mount Herbert (Yakutat), a mountain in Alaska, United States
