= Mount Armour =

Mountain on the border between Alaska and Canada

- Boundary Peak 175
- Location within Alaska Location within British Columbia
- Interactive map of Mount Armour

Highest point
- Elevation: 8,773 ft (2,674 m)
- Prominence: 2,310 ft (700 m)
- Listing: Mountains of Alaska; Mountains of British Columbia
- Coordinates: 59°54′23″N 138°43′04″W

Geography
- Location: Stikine Region, British Columbia; Glacier Bay National Park and Preserve, Alaska
- Parent range: Saint Elias Mountains
- Topo map: NTS 114O15 Mount Aylesworth

Mount Armour, also named Boundary Peak 175, is a mountain in Alaska and British Columbia, located on the Canada–United States border, and part of the Southern Icefield Ranges of the Saint Elias Mountains. It is named after John Douglas Armour (1830–1903), Chief Justice of the High Court of Ontario, and Justice of the Supreme Court of Canada, one of the original Canadian members of the Alaskan Boundary Tribunal in 1903 and who was involved in settling the Alaska boundary dispute between the United States and Canada.

== See also ==
- List of Boundary Peaks of the Alaska–British Columbia/Yukon border
