= Mount Gallatin =

Mountain in British Columbia, Canada

- Boundary Peak 67
- Location within Alaska Location within British Columbia
- Interactive map of Mount Gallatin

Highest point
- Elevation: 1,526 m (5,007 ft)
- Prominence: 786 m (2,579 ft)
- Coordinates: 56°45′14″N 131°54′02″W

Geography
- Location: British Columbia, Canada; Alaska, United States
- Parent range: Boundary Ranges
- Topo map(s): NTS 104B13 Great Glacier; USGS Bradfield Canal D-6

Mount Gallatin, also known as Boundary Peak 67, is a mountain in the Boundary Ranges along the British Columbia-Alaska border.

The Tasakili River begins to the north of Mount Gallatin, within Alaska, then crosses the border shortly after its source, flowing southeast at the foot of the mountain to the Stikine River. Mount Gallatin is the peak immediately north of where the Stikine crosses the international boundary. Just inside that boundary on the Canadian side, at the foot of Mount Gallatin, is the locality and former border post of Stikine, formerly known as Boundary.

== Name origin ==
In 1924 the USGS named the mountain after Albert Gallatin, one of the US commissioners who negotiated the Treaty of Ghent which ended the War of 1812.

== See also ==
- List of Boundary Peaks of the Alaska–British Columbia/Yukon border
