= Alsek Glacier =

Glacier in Alaska, United States

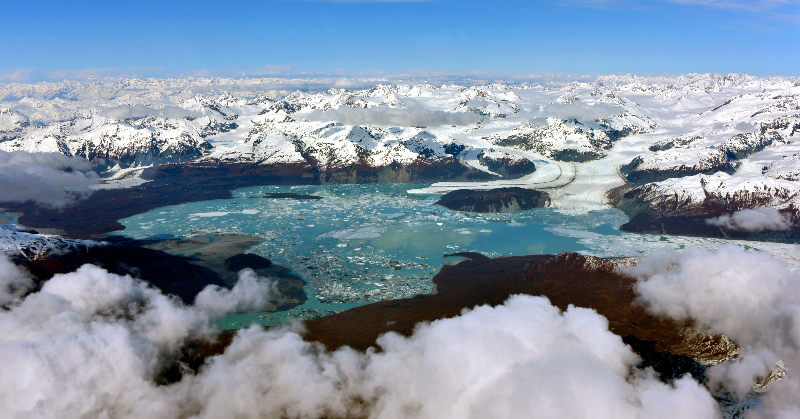
- Alsek Lake on Glacier edge.

- Location within Alaska
- Interactive map of Alsek Glacier
- Location: Alaska Yakutat
- Coordinates: 59°12′05″N 138°02′49″W
- Length: 24-kilometer (15 mi)
- Highest elevation: 1033 ft

Alsek Glacier is a 24-kilometer-long (15 mi) glacier in Glacier Bay National Park in the Panhandle of Alaska (USA). The name Alsek is of Tlingit origin and may mean "place where people rest". The glacier was named in 1901 by U.S. Navy Lieutenant Commander Moser, commander of the U.S. Bureau of Fisheries steamer USS Albatross.

== Geography ==
The glacial feeding area is located northwest of Mount Hay on the west flank of the Fairweather Range at an altitude of 1200 m. The 1.2-km-wide glacier flows west to Alsek Lake, which forms its glacier edge lake and flows through the Alsek River.

== Glacier development ==
The Alsek Glacier retreated about 3.5 km in the 20th century. As a result, the ice front split on a rock in two glacier tongues. The lake area of Alsek Lake doubled in size in the same period.

== See also ==
- List of glaciers in the United States
