= Mount Herbert (Yakutat) =

Mountain in the state of Alaska

- Boundary Peak 172
- Location within Alaska Location within British Columbia

Highest point
- Elevation: 6,102 ft (1,860 m)
- Prominence: 132 ft (40 m)
- Coordinates: 59°46′05″N 138°37′34″W

Geography
- Location: Stikine Region, British Columbia; Glacier Bay National Park and Preserve, Alaska
- Topo map: NTS 114O15 Mount Aylesworth

Mount Herbert, also named Boundary Peak 172, is a mountain in Alaska and British Columbia, located on the Canada–United States border, and part of the Southern Icefield Ranges of the Saint Elias Mountains. It was named in 1923 for Right Honorable Sir Michael Henry Herbert (1857-1903), British Ambassador to the United States during the early stages of Alaska Boundary Tribunal.

== See also ==
- List of Boundary Peaks of the Alaska-British Columbia/Yukon border
