= Tasakili River =

Tributary river in the country of Canada

The Tasakili River is a tributary of the Stikine River, flowing southeast out of the Boundary Ranges on the United States side of the range to join that river in Canada, just before the Stikine transits the Alaska-British Columbia border.

The river originates at 56.7968°N 131.8970°W and transit the border at 56.7885°N 131.8821°W, both to the north of Mount Gallatin, one of the Boundary Peaks. The river's course flows down the east flank of that mountain. The USGS/GNIS gives the river's mouth as being at 56.7114°N 131.7993°W.

== See also ==
- List of rivers of British Columbia
