= Emmanuel de Margerie =

French geographer (1862–1953)

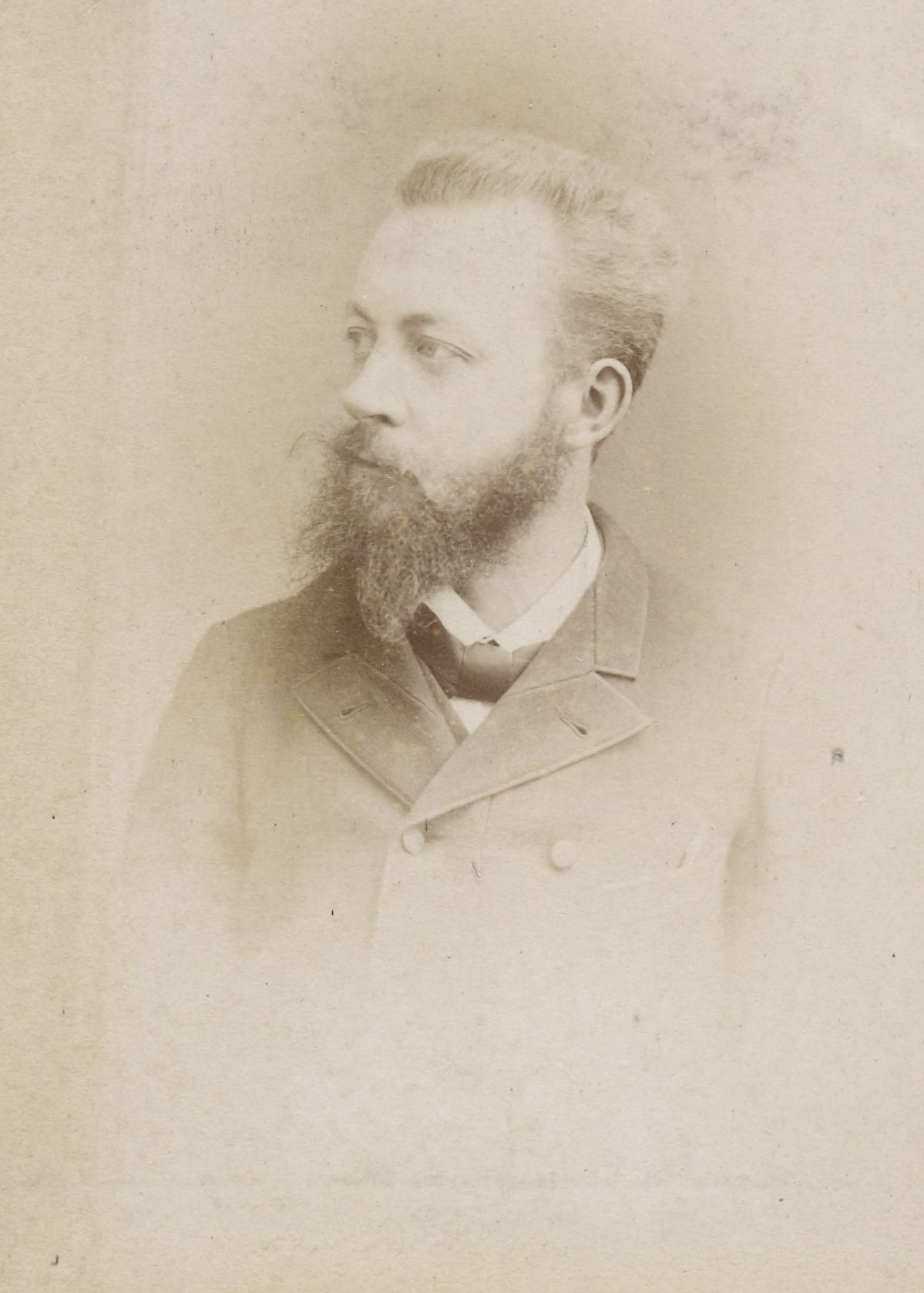
- Born: Emmanuel Marie Pierre Martin Jacquin de Margerie; 11 November 1862
- Died: 20 December 1953 (aged 91)
- Known for: Margerie Glacier
- Awards: ForMemRS; Cullum Geographical Medal (1919); Lyell Medal (1921); Mary Clark Thompson Medal (1923); Wollaston Medal (1946)

Emmanuel Marie Pierre Martin Jacquin de Margerie ForMemRS (11 November 1862 – 20 December 1953) was a French geographer after whom the Margerie Glacier was named, which he visited in 1913.

== Early life and family ==
He is the son of French catholic writer Eugène de Margerie, and a member of the Jacquin de Margerie Family, a French family of nobility dating back to 17th-century royal administrators of Picardy under rule of Louis XIV.

== Awards and honors ==
Margerie was awarded the Cullum Geographical Medal of the American Geographical Society in 1919. He was elected to the American Academy of Arts and Sciences in 1922. In 1923 de Margerie was awarded the Mary Clark Thompson Medal from the National Academy of Sciences. He was elected to the American Philosophical Society in 1932.

The Margerie Glacier is named in his honour.
