= Mount Hay (Yakutat) =

Mountain in the state of Alaska

- Boundary Peak 167
- Location within Alaska Location within British Columbia

Highest point
- Elevation: 8,881 ft (2,707 m)
- Prominence: 3,838 ft (1,170 m)
- Coordinates: 59°14′39″N 137°36′31″W

Geography
- Location: Stikine Region, British Columbia; Glacier Bay National Park and Preserve, Alaska
- Topo map: NTS 114P4 Mount Lodge

Mount Hay, also named Boundary Peak 167, is a mountain in Alaska and British Columbia, located on the Canada–United States border, and part of the Fairweather Range of the Saint Elias Mountains. It was named in 1923 for John Milton Hay (1838-1905), author and diplomat. In 1903, John Hay helped negotiate the treaty resulting in Alaska Boundary Tribunal.

== See also ==
- List of Boundary Peaks of the Alaska-British Columbia/Yukon border
