= Mount Dan Fox =

Mountain in Alaska, United States

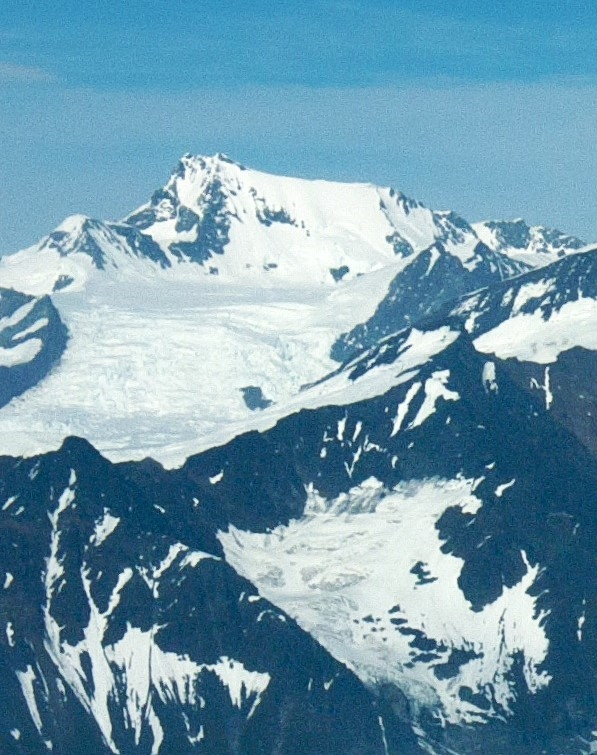
- West aspect

Highest point
- Elevation: 10,891 ft (3,320 m)
- Prominence: 941 ft (287 m)
- Parent peak: Mount Watson
- Isolation: 2.66 mi (4.28 km)
- Coordinates: 59°02′26″N 137°36′01″W

Naming
- Etymology: Daniel T. Fox

Geography
- Location within Alaska
- Interactive map of Mount Dan Fox
- Country: United States
- State: Alaska
- Borough: Yakutat
- Protected area: Glacier Bay National Park
- Parent range: Fairweather Range
- Topo map: USGS Skagway A-7

Mount Dan Fox is a 10,891-foot (3,320-metre) mountain summit in Alaska, United States.

== Description ==
Mount Dan Fox is situated 2.66 miles (4.28 km) northwest of Mount Watson in Glacier Bay National Park and Preserve and the Fairweather Range of the Saint Elias Mountains. Topographic relief is significant as the north face rises 2,400 ft (730 m) in one-half mile (0.8 km). The mountain was climbed on April 21, 1999, by Chris Trimble and Jim Earl via the North Face. They named the peak to remember Daniel T. "Dan" Fox (1951–1999), a mountain climber and counselor who died of lung cancer from exposure to secondhand smoke at the age of 47.

== Climate ==
Based on the Köppen climate classification, Mount Dan Fox has a tundra climate with cold, snowy winters, and cool summers. Weather systems coming off the Gulf of Alaska are forced upwards by the mountains (orographic lift), causing heavy precipitation in the form of rainfall and snowfall. Winter temperatures can drop below 0 °F with wind chill factors below −10 °F. This climate supports glaciers covering all slopes of this peak. The months May through July offer the most favorable weather for viewing or climbing Mount Dan Fox.

== See also ==
- List of mountain peaks of Alaska
- Geography of Alaska

== Gallery ==
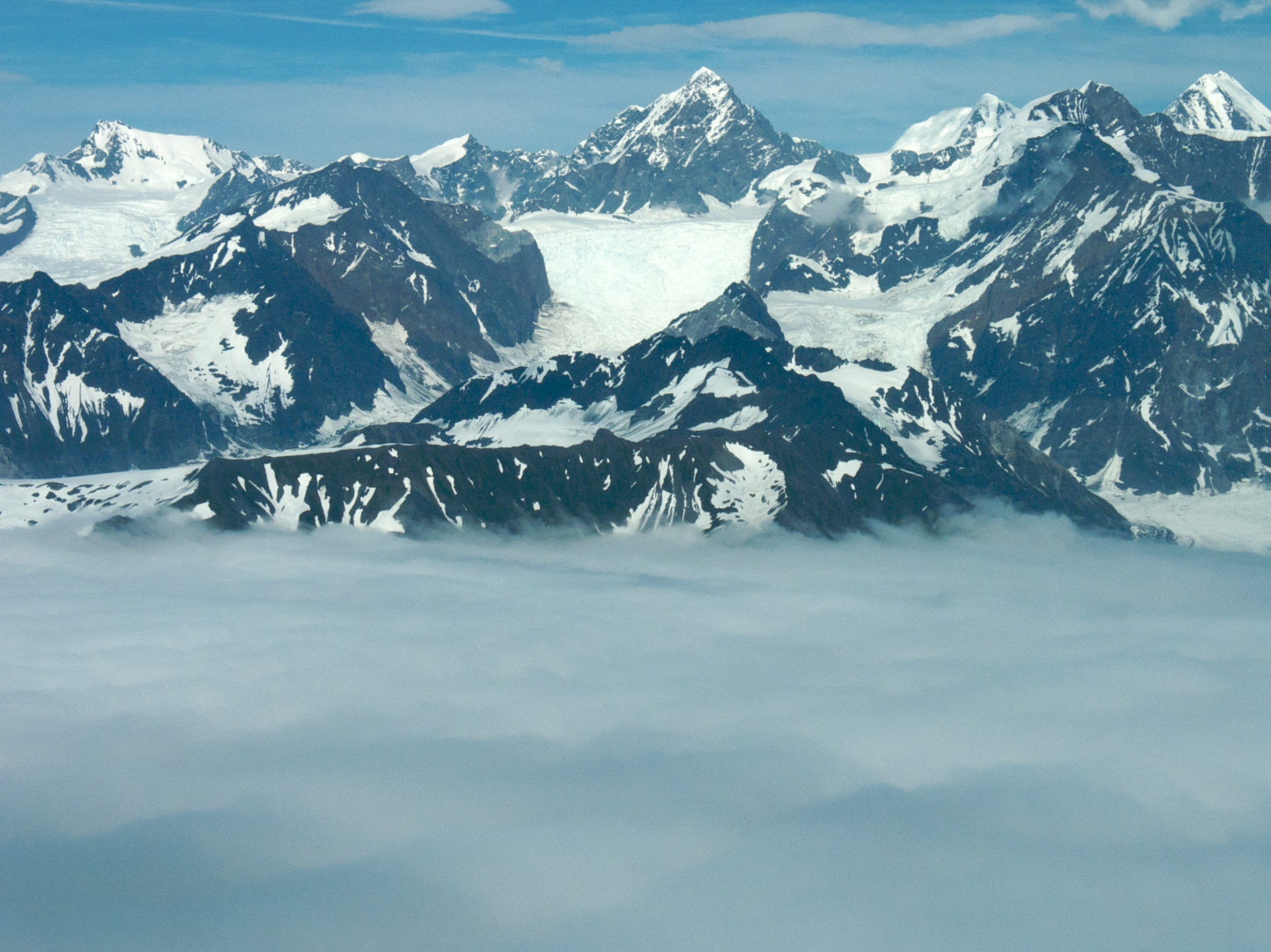
Mount Dan Fox in upper left, Mount Watson centered at top, Mount Root in upper right corner.
