= Mount Watson (Alaska) =

Mountain in Alaska, United States

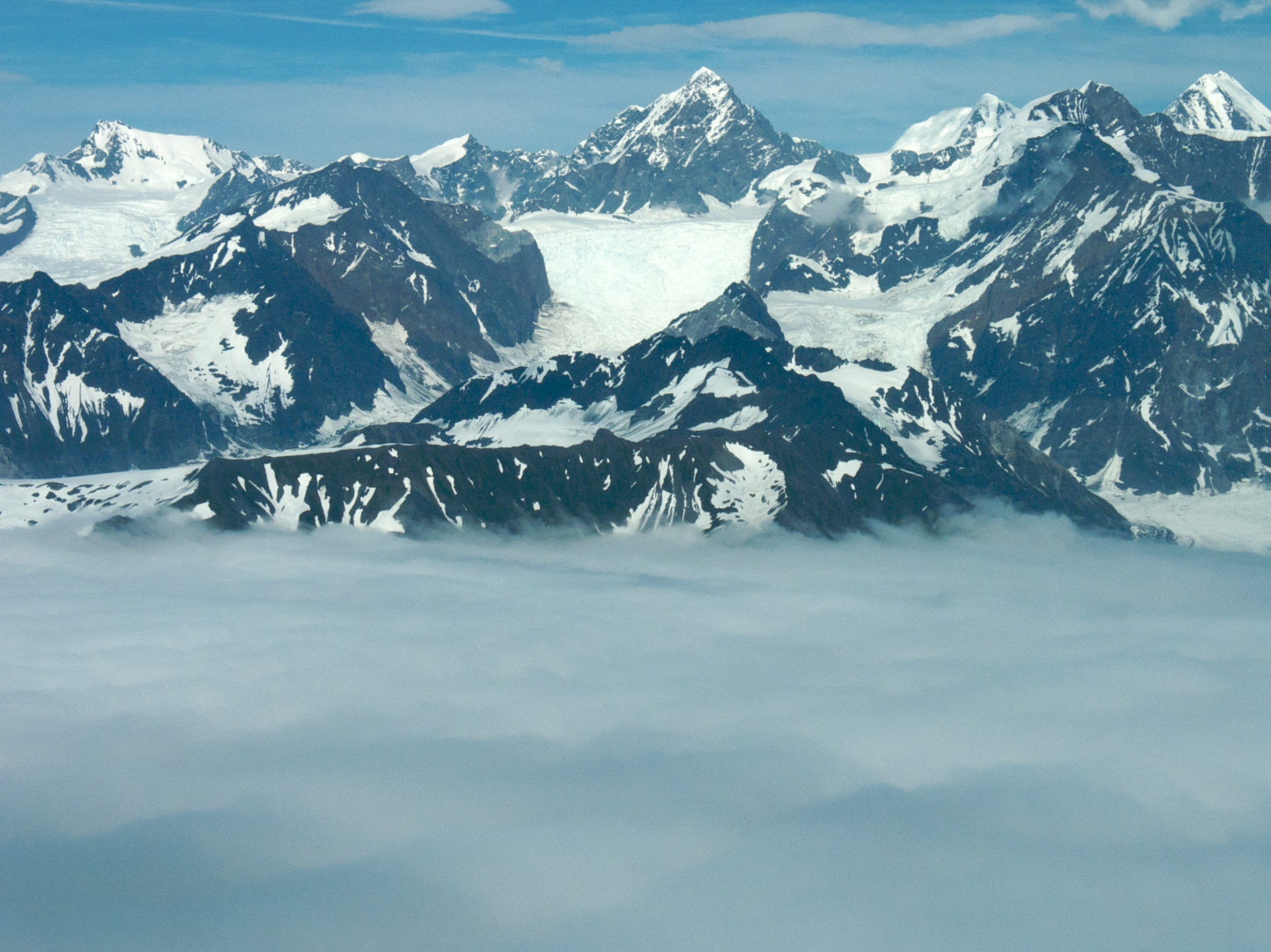
- Mount Watson centered in back

Highest point
- Elevation: 12,497 ft (3,809 m)
- Prominence: 3,809 ft (1,161 m)
- Parent peak: Mount Root (12,887 ft)
- Listing: Highest US summits 143rd
- Coordinates: 59°00′32″N 137°33′15″W

Geography
- Location within Alaska
- Location: Glacier Bay National Park; Borough of Yakutat; Alaska, United States
- Parent range: Fairweather Range; Saint Elias Mountains
- Topo map: USGS Skagway A-7

Climbing
- First ascent: June 18, 1974
- Easiest route: Mountaineering

Mount Watson is a 12,497-foot (3,809 m) glaciated mountain summit located in the Fairweather Range of the Saint Elias Mountains, in southeast Alaska, United States. It ranks as the fifth-highest peak in the Fairweather Range. The peak is situated in Glacier Bay National Park, 2 mi (3 km) west of the Canada–United States border, and 7.16 mi (12 km) north of Mount Fairweather, which is the highest peak in the Fairweather Range. The mountain's name was officially adopted by the United States Board on Geographic Names in 1924 to commemorate David Thompson Watson (1844-1916), who was US Counsel to the 1903 Alaska Boundary Tribunal.

The first ascent of the peak was made June 18, 1974, by Michael Allen, Walter Gove, Lawrence Dauelsberg, Alice Liska, and Donald Liska via the East Ridge. The first ascent of the North Face was made in April 1999 by Chris Trimble and Jim Earl. The months May through June offer the most favorable weather for climbing.

== Climate ==
Based on the Köppen climate classification, Mount Watson has a subarctic climate with cold, snowy winters, and mild summers. Temperatures can drop below −20 °C with wind chill factors below −30 °C. This climate supports hanging glaciers on its slopes as well as the large Grand Plateau Glacier to the west. Precipitation runoff and meltwater from its glaciers drains into the Gulf of Alaska.

== See also ==
- Geography of Alaska
- Geography of British Columbia
