= Mount Root =

Mountain in Alaska and British Columbia

- Boundary Peak 165
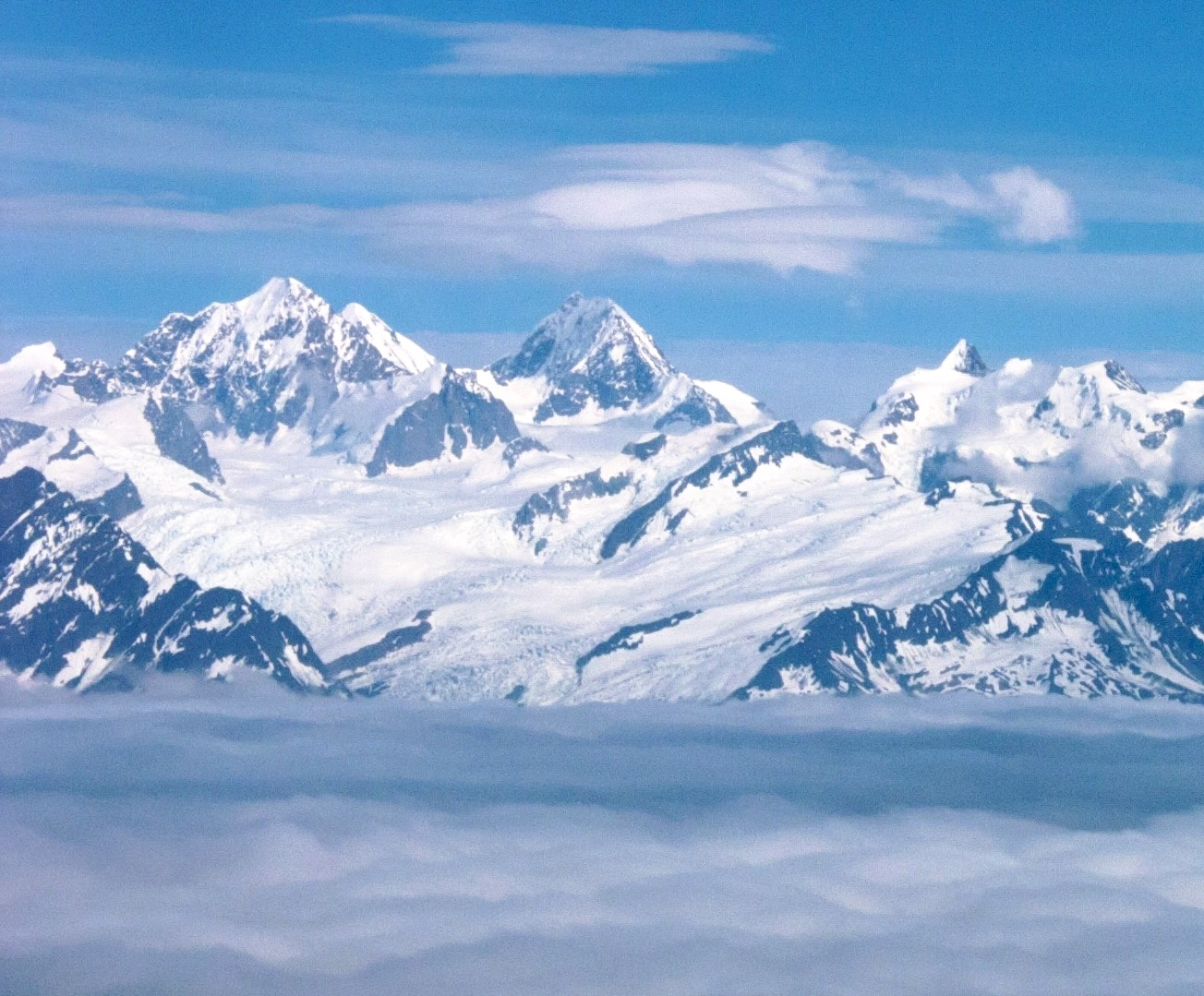
- West aspect of Mt. Root centered. (Mount Watson to left)

Highest point
- Elevation: 12,887 ft (3,928 m) NGVD 29
- Prominence: 2,913 ft (888 m)
- Parent peak: Mount Fairweather
- Listing: Canada highest major peaks 24th; Mountains of British Columbia
- Coordinates: 58°59′08″N 137°30′01″W

Naming
- Etymology: Elihu Root

Geography
- Location within Alaska Location within British Columbia
- Location: Stikine Region, British Columbia; Glacier Bay National Park and Preserve, Alaska
- Parent range: Fairweather Range
- Topo map(s): NTS 114I13; USGS Mount Fairweather D-5

Climbing
- First ascent: 1977 by Laurel Adkins, Thomas Distler, George Fisher, Walter Gove
- Easiest route: Ice climb

Mount Root, also named Boundary Peak 165, is a mountain in Alaska and British Columbia, located on the Canada–United States border, and part of the Fairweather Range of the Saint Elias Mountains. It is named for Elihu Root, who was one of the diplomats involved in settling the Alaska boundary dispute between the United States and Canada. It is where the Margerie Glacier is located.

The first ascent was made June 13, 1977, by Laurel Adkins, Thomas Distler, George Fisher and Walter Gove via the East Ridge. (Note: The NPS says the FA was on June 18, 1974 but AAJ 1975 states this was the date of the FA of nearby Mt. Watson with a different party composition.) It involved 22 pitches of ice climbing.

== See also ==
- List of Boundary Peaks of the Alaska–British Columbia/Yukon border
