= Mount Lodge (Fairweather Range) =

Mountain on Alaska/British Columbia border

- Boundary Peak 166
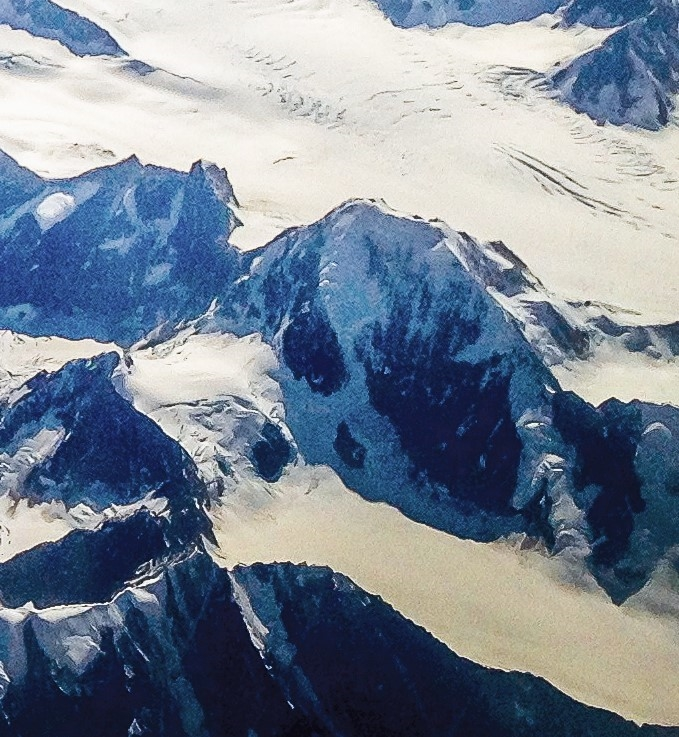
- North aspect, from airliner

Highest point
- Elevation: 10,548 ft (3,215 m)
- Prominence: 2,871 ft (875 m)
- Listing: Mountains of British Columbia
- Coordinates: 59°06′24″N 137°32′32″W

Geography
- Location within Alaska Location within British Columbia
- Location: Stikine Region, British Columbia; Glacier Bay National Park and Preserve, Alaska
- Topo map: NTS 114P4 Mount Lodge

Mount Lodge, also named Boundary Peak 166, is a mountain in Alaska and British Columbia, located on the Canada–United States border, and part of the Fairweather Range of the Saint Elias Mountains. It was named in 1908 for Senator Henry Cabot Lodge, (1850-1924), U.S. Boundary Commissioner in 1903.

== Climate ==
Based on the Köppen climate classification, Mount Lodge is located in a subpolar oceanic climate zone with long, cold, snowy winters, and cool summers. Weather systems coming off the Gulf of Alaska are forced upwards by the mountains of the Fairweather Range (orographic lift), causing heavy precipitation in the form of rain and snow. Winter temperatures can drop to 10 °F with wind chill factors below 0 °F. This climate supports glaciers surrounding the mountain's slopes.

== See also ==
- List of Boundary Peaks of the Alaska–British Columbia/Yukon border
