= Margerie Glacier =

Glacier in Glacier Bay, Alaska, United States

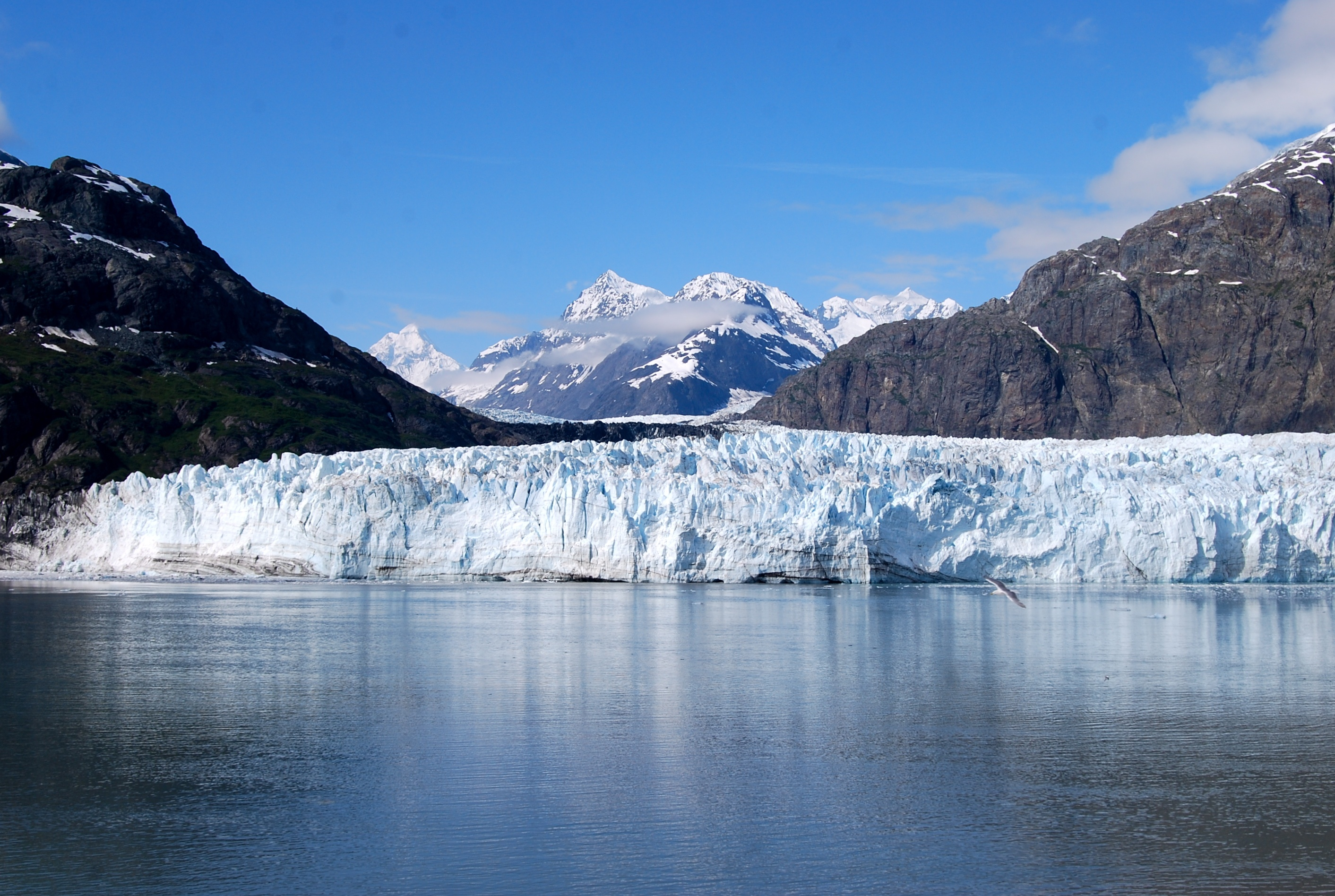
- Margerie Glacier

- Location within Alaska
- Interactive map of Margerie Glacier
- Type: Tidewater — constrained valley
- Location: Glacier Bay National Park; Mount Root to Glacier Bay, Alaska
- Coordinates: 58°58′04″N 137°10′33″W
- Length: 21 miles (34 km)
- Thickness: 350 feet (110 m)
- Terminus: Sea level
- Status: Stable

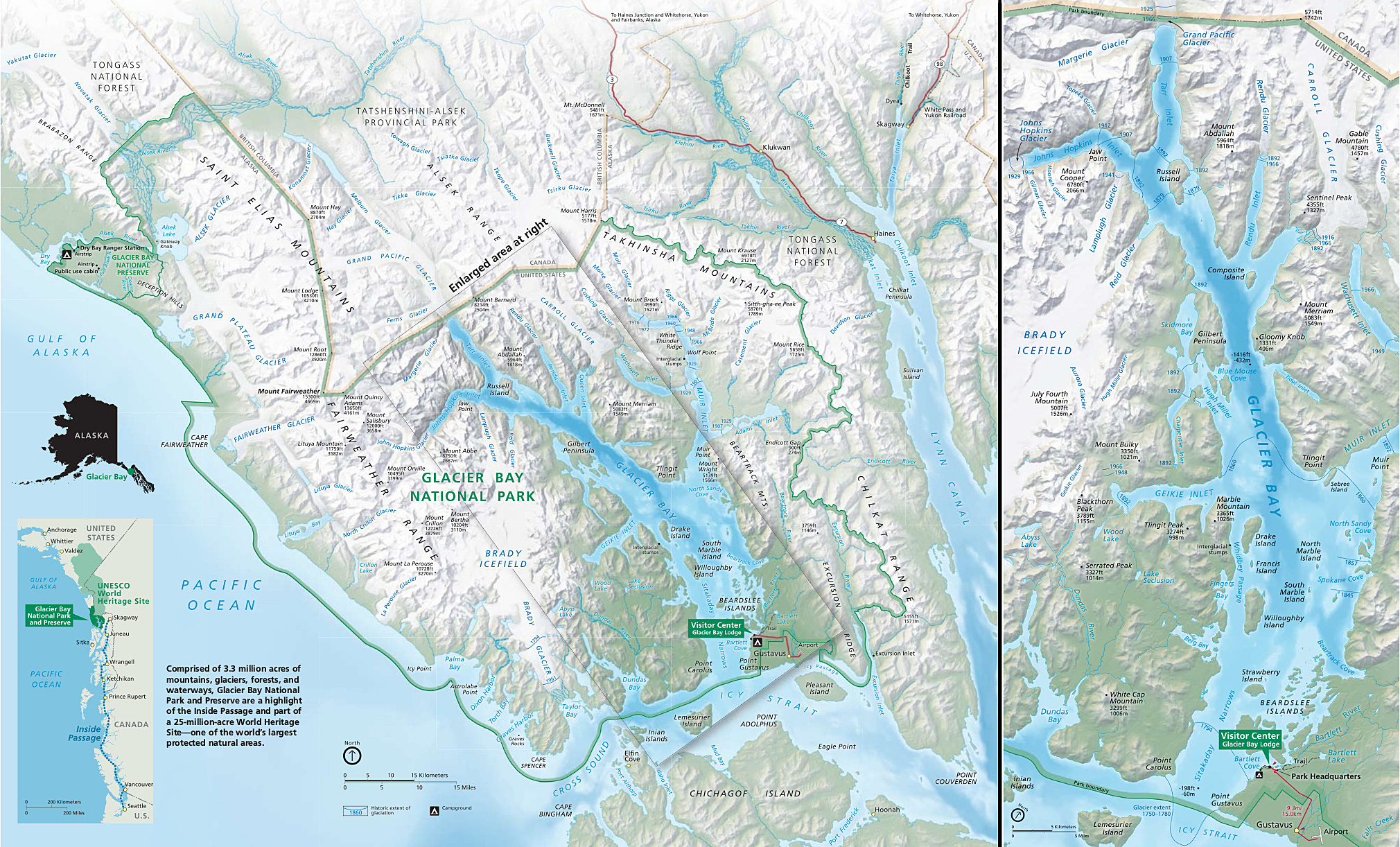
Map of Glacier Bay National Park and Preserve

Margerie Glacier is a 21 mi (34 km) long tidewater glacier in Glacier Bay, Alaska, United States within the boundaries of Glacier Bay National Park and Preserve. The glacier begins on the southern slopes of Mount Root, elevation 12,860 feet (3,920 m), on the Alaska–Canada border flowing southeast down the valley, then turning to the northeast toward its terminus in Tarr Inlet. Margerie Glacier is one of the most active and frequently-visited glaciers in Glacier Bay, which was declared a National Monument in 1925, a National Park and Preserve in 1980, a UNESCO World Biosphere Reserve in 1986 and a World Heritage Site in 1992. While most of the tidewater glaciers in the park have been receding over the last several decades, Margerie Glacier has become stable, neither growing nor receding, while Johns Hopkins Glacier is advancing.

Margerie Glacier extends upstream for a length of 21 miles (34 km) from Tarr Inlet to its source on the southern slopes of Mount Root. The width of the glacier is about 1 mile (1.6 km) and the total height at its terminus is about 350 feet (110 m) including 100 feet (30 m) that is underwater.

In 1750, Glacier Bay was a massive single glacier but due to higher average temperatures and lower average snowfall amounts over the last several centuries it has been transformed into what is now a 65 miles (105 km) fjord with many smaller glaciers. Margerie Glacier is located at the extreme northwestern end of the bay and is situated perpendicular to the Grand Pacific Glacier.

Glacier Bay and its many glaciers are approachable only by air and water as there are no roads in the park. The steep drop off of Margerie Glacier terminus allows cruise ships and smaller park tour boats to anchor nearby providing close-up views of ice calving.

== History ==
Margerie Glacier is named after French geologist and geographer Emmanuel de Margerie who visited the area in 1913. Glacier Bay was completely covered by ice in 1794 when Captain George Vancouver and his expedition were stopped by a wall of ice 20 miles (32 km) wide and 4,000 feet (1,200 m) high. When John Muir first visited the bay in 1879 the ice had retreated 48 miles (77 km) into the bay. The ice wall has since retreated 65 miles (105 km) from the mouth of the bay and is only a remnant of the massive glacier seen by Vancouver. The bay now contains eight tidewater glaciers, including Margerie, within small inlets along its perimeter.

The glaciers in Glacier Bay are remnants of a general ice advance—the Little Ice Age—that began about 4,000 years ago. This advance is not comparable to continental glaciation that occurred during the Wisconsin Ice Age of the Pleistocene epoch. About 1750, the Little Ice Age reached its maximum stage and a general recession of glaciers began. Ice flows have been recorded at Margerie Glacier at 2,000 feet (610 m) per year or 6 feet (1.8 m) per day. The advance was reduced to a rate of 30 feet (9.1 m) per year or about 1 inch (2.5 cm) per day until 1998 when some degree of recession was recorded as the northern part of the terminus formed a small embayment, while the southern part continued advancing at 1 foot (0.30 m) per year. In the 1990s, Margerie Glacier was attached to the Grand Pacific Glacier; however, it has since detached from the Grand Pacific which is receding, with debris from a moraine left behind in the gap between the glaciers.

== Features ==
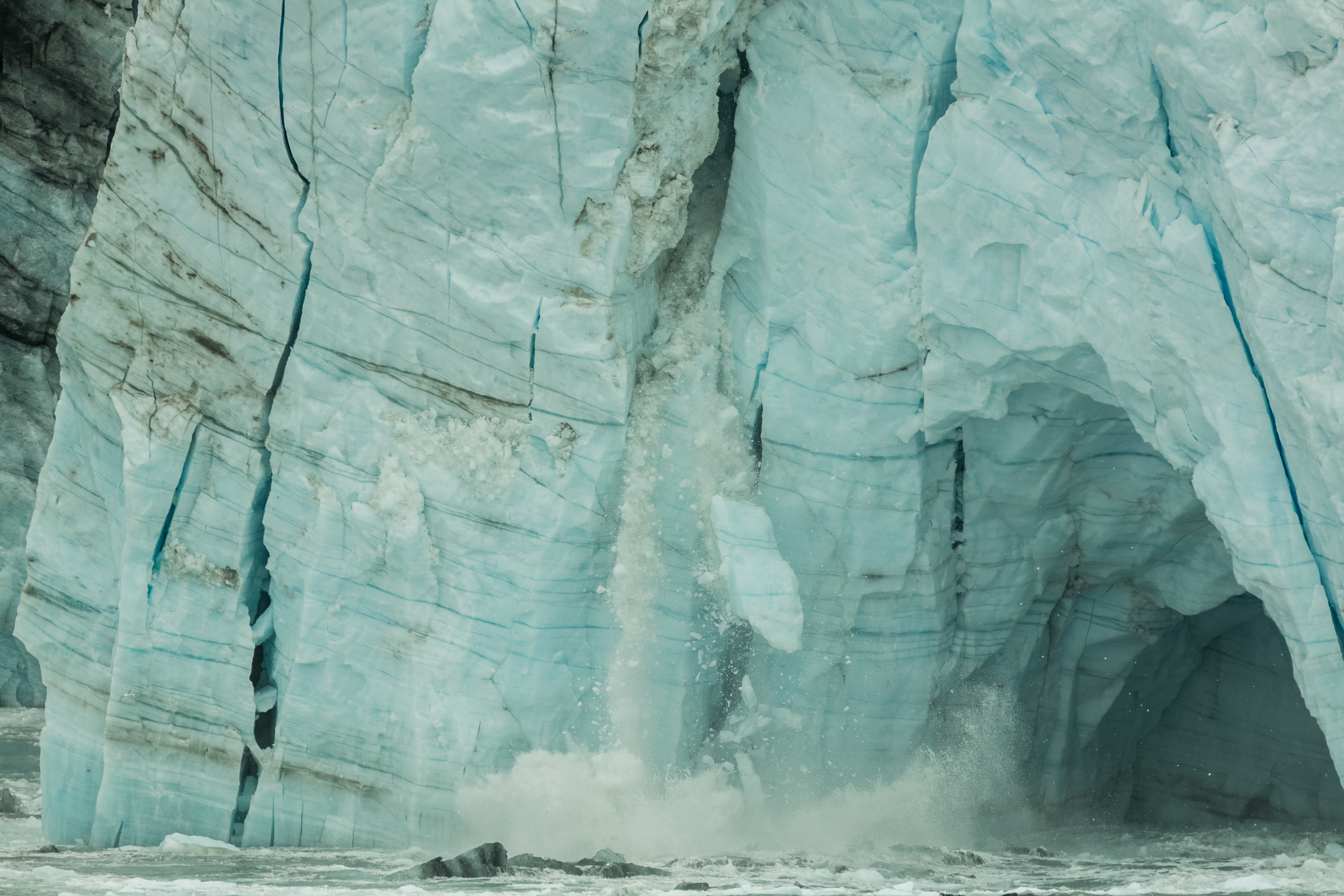
Ice chunk calving (calving animation)

Margerie Glacier is categorized as a tidewater glacier, one of eleven remaining in the park, with eight in the bay and three on the Pacific Ocean coastal area of the park. A tidewater glacier is one whose terminus encounters seawater at least at high tide, if not at all tide levels. Margerie Glacier and six other glaciers have termini that are fully submerged at all tide levels. Margerie Glacier has a total height of 350 feet (110 m) of which 250 feet (76 m) rises above the water level and 100 feet (30 m) is beneath the water surface. Like many glaciers it contains moraines which appear as dark areas composed of dirt, stones and larger rocks mixed in with the ice and transported downstream to eventually be ejected from the glacier's terminus. The glacial ice appears blue as a result of the absorption of red, orange, yellow and green wavelengths of light and, consequently, pools of meltwater on top of the glacier will appear bright blue. Margerie Glacier is a much cleaner glacier with less debris compared to the Grand Pacific Glacier located adjacent to Margerie's northeastern flank. It is also one of the most active glaciers for ice calving along with the Johns Hopkins Glacier. As a glacier calves it makes sounds similar to gunshots from the cracking of the ice and the release of trapped air, then a roaring boom as the ice tumbles down into the sea. Freshwater upwellings emerge from the central area of the glacier's terminus, generated by meltwater streams running underneath the glacier. Such areas attract sea birds which feed on the fish that can be found there.

In a study of the bedrock geology and mineral resources of Glacier Bay, out of 17 areas classified as containing mineral deposits, Margerie Glacier has been identified as containing copper deposits.

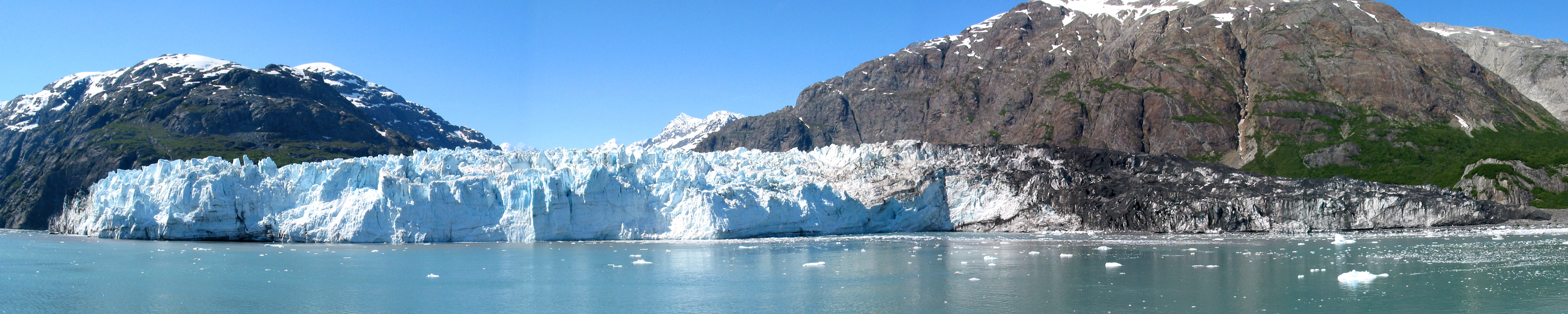
Layers of rock debris are mixed with ice at the sides of the terminus

== Flora and fauna ==
Margerie Glacier is a part of the Glacier Bay National Park and Preserve which—with its combination of tidewater glaciers, coastlines, fjords, rivers and lakes—provides widely varying landscapes and seascapes that support 333 vascular plant taxa, 274 bird species, 160 fish species, 41 mammal species, and 3 amphibian species. Arctic terns and gulls nest in the rocks of Margerie Glacier. As this glacier calves, it disturbs the krill and small fish, thus making it an ideal spot for birds. Humpback whales and grizzly bears are also sometimes seen near this glacier. Studies have been performed on Margerie Glacier on glacier mice, which are colonies of mosses which move across the glacier over time, due to forces that are not well understood.

== See also ==
- Glacier Bay
- Glacier Bay National Park and Preserve
- Grand Pacific Glacier
- Fairweather Range
- Mount Forde

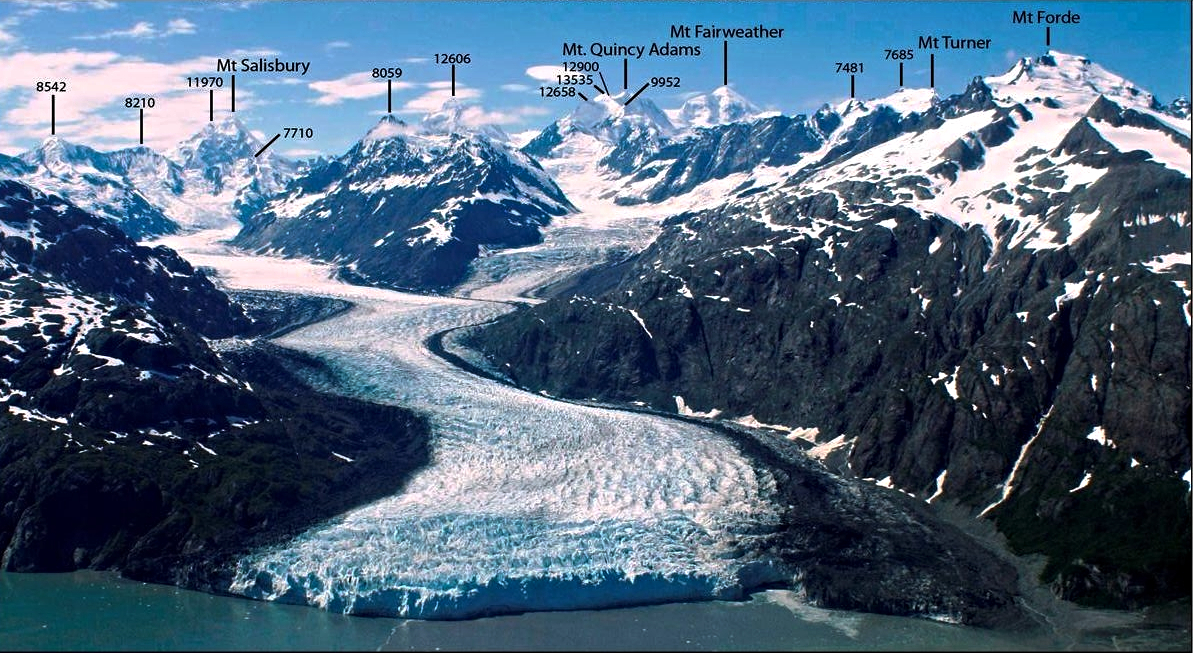
Margerie Glacier aerial view
