= John Douglas Armour =

Canadian lawyer and Supreme Court judge

The Honourable John Douglas Armour
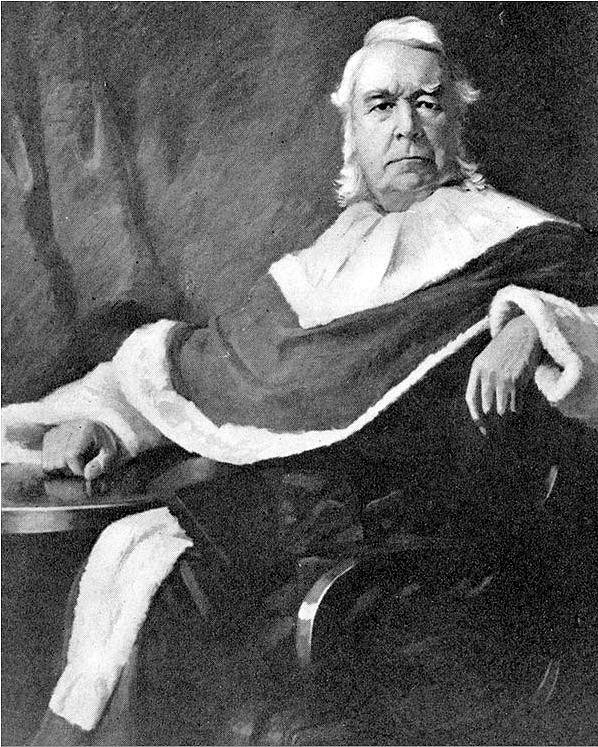

Puisne Justice of the Supreme Court of Canada
- In office November 21, 1902 – July 11, 1903
- Nominated by: Wilfrid Laurier
- Preceded by: Henri Elzéar Taschereau
- Succeeded by: Albert Killam

Chief Justice of Ontario
- In office July 2, 1900 – November 20, 1902

Personal details
- Born: May 4, 1830 Otonabee, Upper Canada
- Died: July 11, 1903 (aged 73) London, England

John Douglas Armour (May 4, 1830 – July 11, 1903) was a Canadian Puisne judge of the Supreme Court of Canada.

Born in the township of Otonabee, Upper Canada (now Ontario), the son of Samuel Armour, he was educated at Upper Canada College, and received a Bachelor of Arts degree in 1850 from the University of Toronto. He then articled with his brother, Robert Armour, and then with Philip Michael Matthew Scott VanKoughnet. He was called to the Bar in 1853 and practised law for 25 years in Cobourg, Ontario.

In 1877, he was appointed to the Court of Queen's Bench of Ontario and was appointed as its chief justice in November of that year. In 1901, he was appointed Chief Justice of Ontario.

== Justice of the Supreme Court of Canada ==
On November 21, 1902, Prime Minister Wilfrid Laurier appointed Armour to the Supreme Court of Canada, after the resignation of Chief Justice Samuel Henry Strong and the elevation of Henri-Elzéar Taschereau to the Chief Justice role. Prior to the appointment, Armour had spent 24 years as a judge, but was already in poor health. Armour only participated in two sessions of the Court, before dying in London, England during his service on the Alaska Boundary Commission.

== Legacy ==
Armour's legal legacy rests in his 24 years of service in the Ontario Courts, and not his brief seven month appointment to the Supreme Court of Canada. The contemporary view was that Armour was a good judge who had "common sense," had the ability to understand "conditions of life in Canada" and the spirit of the law. Armour was noted to be sympathetic to common Canadians and less to towards corporations.

Mount Armour, aka Boundary Peak 175, a summit on the boundary between British Columbia and the US state of Alaska, was named for him. Justice Armour was one of the original commissioners of the Alaska Boundary Tribunal and was replaced on it after his death by A.B. Aylesworth.

Also Armour Township in Ontario, Canada, was named after him.
