= Grand Pacific Pass =

Mountain pass in British Columbia, Canada

- Location within British Columbia
- Elevation: 738 metres (2,421 ft)

Third Approach
- Location: British Columbia, Canada
- Range: Fairweather Range
- Coordinates: 59°12′N 137°15′W
- Topo map: NTS 114P3 Grand Pacific Glacier

Grand Pacific Pass, 738 m (2,421 ft), is a significant mountain pass in the Fairweather Range of the Alsek Ranges of the Saint Elias Mountains, standing northeast of the massif containing Mount Fairweather. A glacial pass, it is impassable for ordinary purposes. The pass forms the divide between Grand Pacific Glacier and Melbern Glacier, which flow south and north to Tarr Inlet and the Alsek River, respectively.
