= Grand Pacific Glacier =

Glacier in Canada and the United States

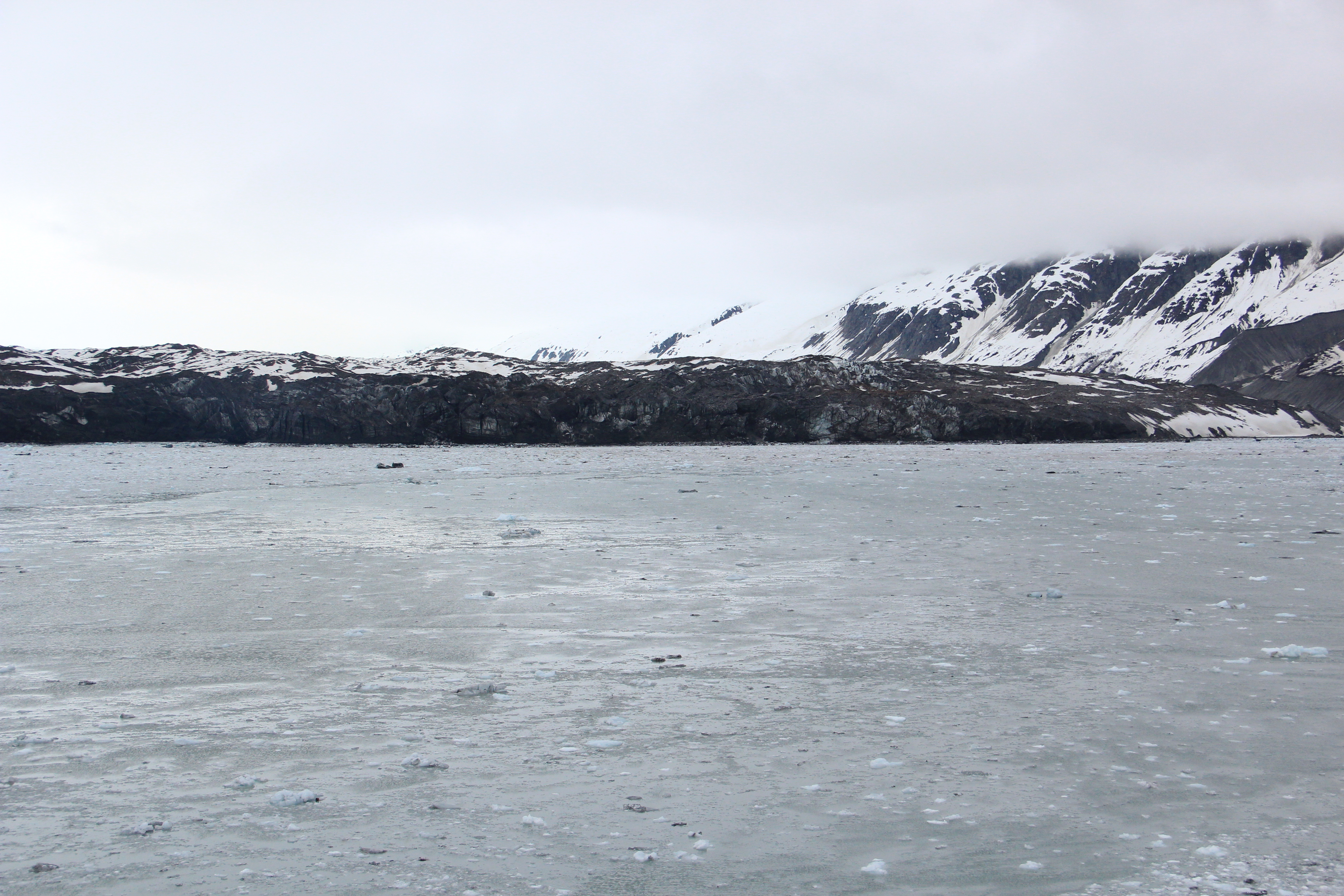
- The Grand Pacific Glacier Terminus

- Location within Alaska
- Interactive map of Grand Pacific Glacier
- Location: Yakutat City and Borough, Alaska, U.S.
- Coordinates: 59°11′N 137°18′W
- Length: 25 km (16 mi)
- Status: Retreating

Grand Pacific Glacier is a 25 km (16 mi) long glacier in British Columbia and Alaska. It begins in Glacier Bay National Park in the Saint Elias Mountains, 7 km (4.3 mi) southwest of Mount Hay, trends east into the Grand Pacific Pass area of British Columbia, and then southeast to the head of Tarr Inlet at Alaska-Canada boundary, 68 miles (109 km) west of Skagway.

== National Park Service Information ==
In 2004 Grand Pacific Glacier was about 2 miles (3,200 m) wide at the terminus, averaging about 150 feet (50 m) high at the ice face, up to 60 feet (20 m) deep at the waterline and over 35 miles (56 km) long. Much of the ice margin was then grounded at low tide; the calving section probably reached a water depth of only 30–60 feet (10–20 m). The ice cliff was estimated to be 60 feet (20 m) high where it was grounded, but about 150 feet (50 m) and up to 180 feet (55 m) high where it calved into Tarr Inlet. Behind the terminus, the ice may thicken to 900 feet (300 m) or more. The western two thirds of the ice in the terminus of the Grand Pacific Glacier originate from the tributary Ferris Glacier, and flowed about 1,500 feet (500 m) per year or about 4 feet (1 m) per day. This latter estimate was based on measurements of aerial photographs taken between 1988 and 1990 and may be higher than 2004 rates based on the fact that the ice had been thinning over the last 7 years or so. The eastern portion of Grand Pacific Glacier moved only about 150–180 feet (46–55 m) per year based on GPS measurements made by the Cold Regions Research and Engineering Laboratory (CRREL) in 1998–1999. It had advanced at a rate of about 60 feet (20 m) per year for the last several decades, but it reached a maximum position when it joined Margerie Glacier around 1992. In 2004 those glaciers were no longer together due to recession of the Grand Pacific margin. A small stream flowed between the two termini. The eastern edge was then receding at about 30–60 feet (10–20 m) per year and showed significant thinning and closure of crevasses. In about 1996, an embayment began to form in the center of Grand Pacific's terminus. Since then, the center of the ice cliff began to calve more rapidly and was slowly receding at perhaps 30 feet (10 m) or less per year. In 2004 the CRREL anticipated that retreat would accelerate as the embayment enlarged and the depth at the waterline increased. In such a scenario, retreat was likely to continue until the terminus reaches a position where it will become grounded above mean tide. The grounded western edge of the glacier was also slowing receding and thinning. Rock debris from landslides and medial moraines cover much of this side of the glacier and extends across almost two-thirds of the ice face. Where this rock debris is more than an inch thick, it insulates the ice, slows melting and results in a thicker ice mass than where the ice is clean. In many areas on the glacier, the debris is more than 3 feet (1 m) thick.

== See also ==
- List of glaciers
- Glacier Bay Basin
- Tatshenshini–Alsek Provincial Park
