= Mount Aylesworth =

Mountain in Alaska and British Columbia

- Boundary Peak 176
- Location within Alaska Location within British Columbia
- Interactive map of Mount Aylesworth

Highest point
- Elevation: 9,285 ft (2,830 m)
- Prominence: 4,659 ft (1,420 m)
- Parent peak: Mount Seattle (10,350 ft (3,150 m)
- Listing: Mountains of Alaska; Mountains of British Columbia
- Coordinates: 59°55′26″N 138°47′55″W

Geography
- Location: Stikine Region, British Columbia; Glacier Bay National Park and Preserve, Alaska
- Parent range: Saint Elias Mountains
- Topo map: NTS 114O15 Mount Aylesworth

Mount Aylesworth, also named Boundary Peak 176 (first called "Peak 8900"), is a mountain in Alaska and British Columbia, located on the Canada–United States border, and part of the Southern Icefield Ranges of the Saint Elias Mountains. It is named after Sir Allen Bristol Aylesworth (1854–1952), Canadian constitutional lawyer and member of Alaskan Boundary Tribunal, and who was involved in settling the Alaska boundary dispute between the United States and Canada.

== See also ==
- List of Boundary Peaks of the Alaska–British Columbia/Yukon border
