= Mount Klooch =

Mountain in Alaska, United States

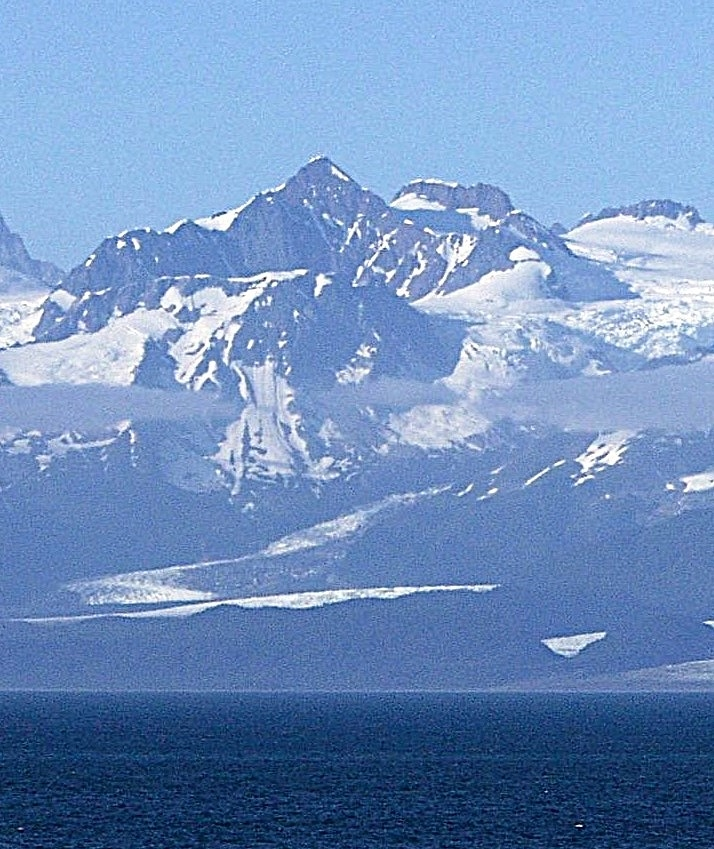
- South aspect

Highest point
- Elevation: 7,661 ft (2,335 m)
- Prominence: 1,111 ft (339 m)
- Parent peak: Peak 8474
- Isolation: 2.09 mi (3.36 km)
- Coordinates: 58°36′35″N 137°16′13″W

Geography
- Location within Alaska
- Interactive map of Mount Klooch
- Country: United States
- State: Alaska
- Census Area: Hoonah–Angoon
- Protected area: Glacier Bay National Park
- Parent range: Fairweather Range
- Topo map: USGS Mount Fairweather C-4

Mount Klooch is a 7,661-foot (2,335-metre) mountain summit in Alaska, United States.

== Description ==
Mount Klooch is situated 3.6 miles (5.8 km) northwest of Mount Dagelet and five miles (8.0 km) southwest of Mount Crillon in Glacier Bay National Park and Preserve. It is part of the Fairweather Range which is the southernmost range of the Saint Elias Mountains. Topographic relief is significant as both the north and south faces of the peak rise 2,660 ft (810 m) in one-half mile (0.8 km). The mountain's toponym was published by members of the 1933–34 Harvard-Dartmouth Expedition, and the toponym has been officially adopted by the U.S. Board on Geographic Names. "Klooch" is a Chinook Jargon word that means "Native American woman", and it's a variant of the word "klootchman." It is derived from the Nootka word "hlotssma," meaning "woman" or "wife."

== Climate ==
Based on the Köppen climate classification, Mount Klooch has a tundra climate with cold, snowy winters, and cool summers. Weather systems coming off the Gulf of Alaska are forced upwards by the mountains (orographic lift), causing heavy precipitation in the form of rainfall and snowfall. Winter temperatures can drop below 0 °F with wind chill factors below −10 °F. This climate supports glaciers surrounding the slopes of this peak, including the Klooch Glacier on the southwest slope. The months May through July offer the most favorable weather for viewing or climbing Mount Klooch.

== See also ==
- List of mountain peaks of Alaska
- Geography of Alaska

== Gallery ==
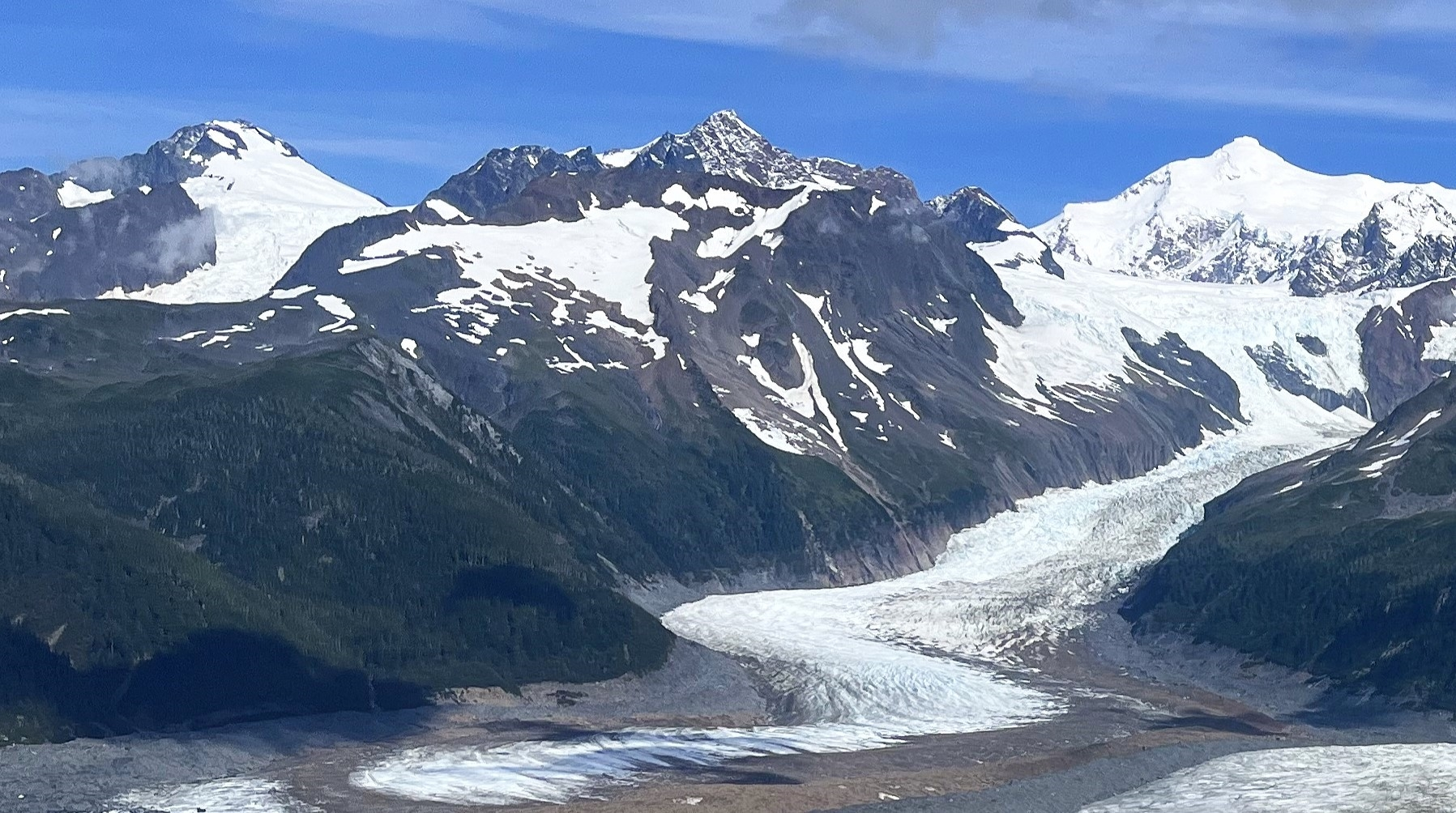
Mount Klooch centered at top, Mount Crillon to right

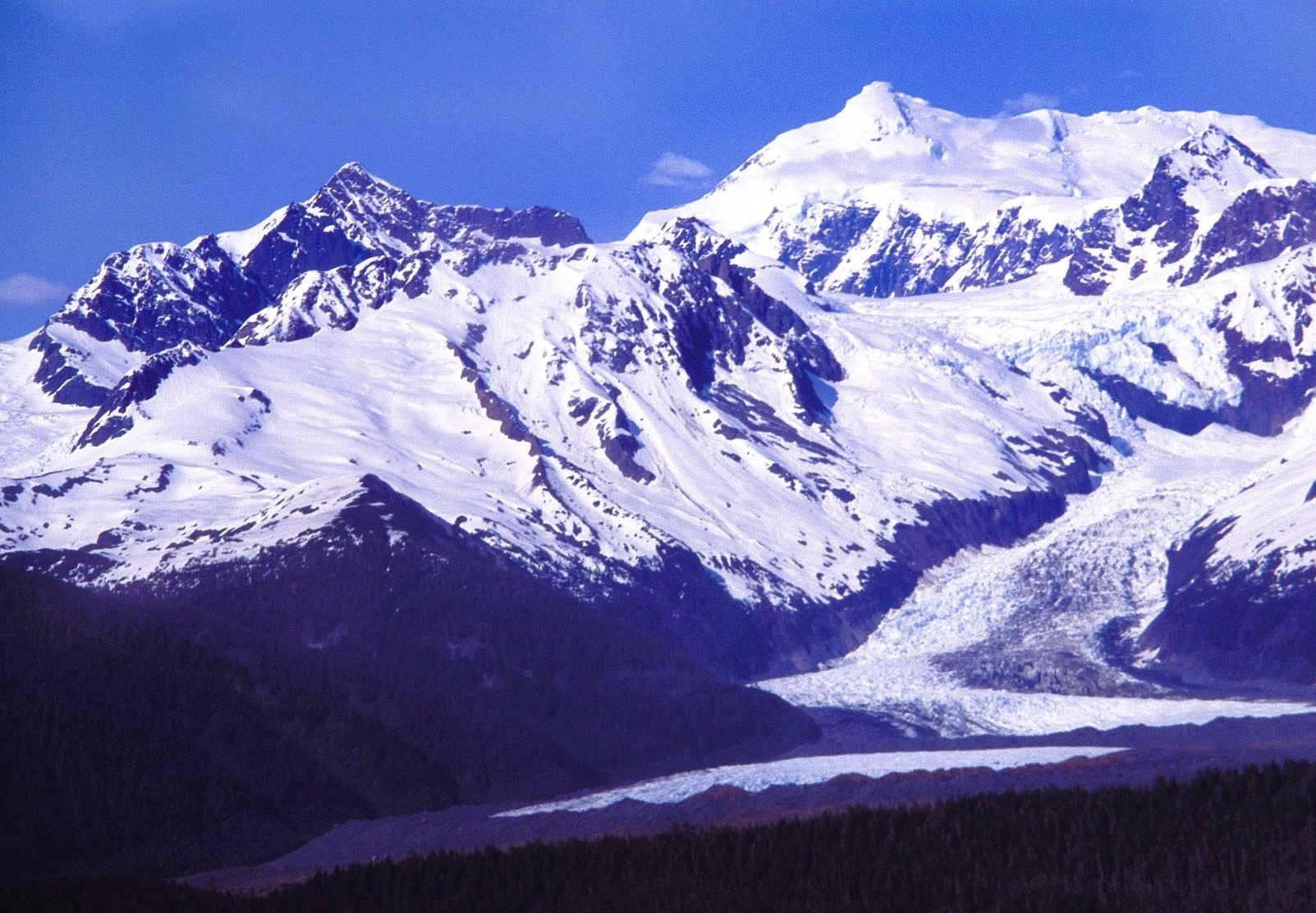
Mount Klooch left, Mount Crillon right

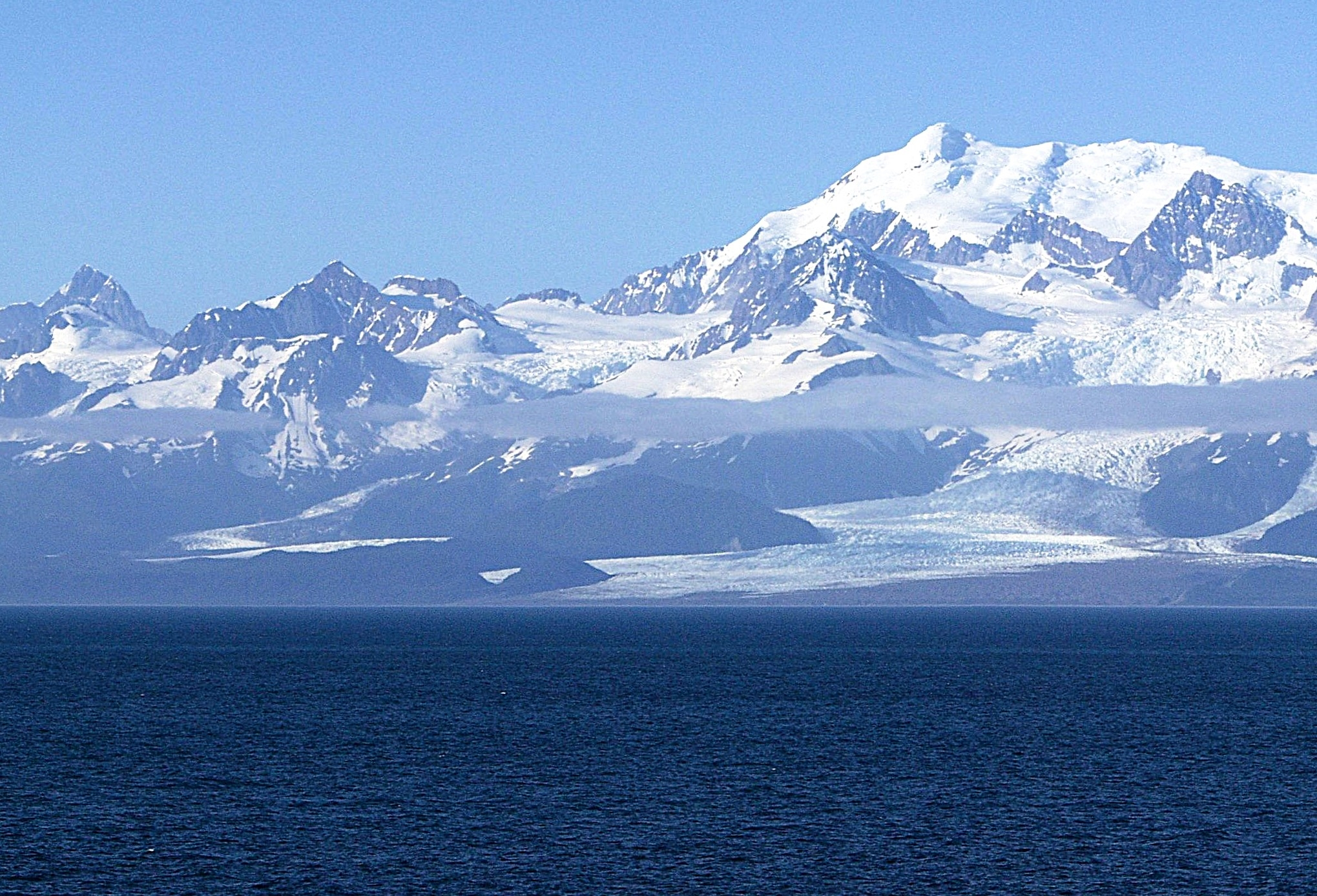
L→R: Mts. Orville, Klooch, Crillon, Dagelet

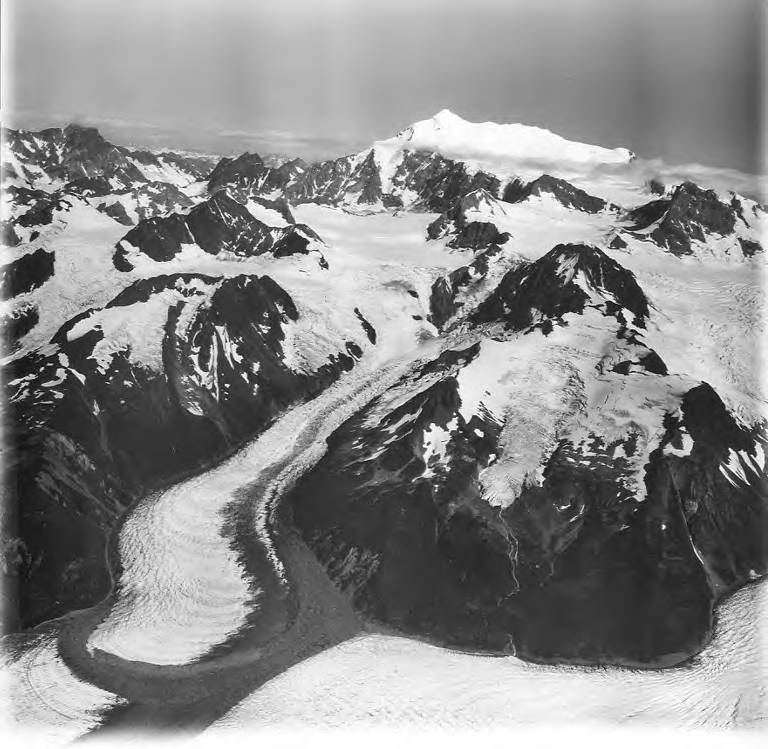
Mount Klooch to left, Mount Crillon on skyline
