= Mount Dagelet =

Mountain in Alaska, United States

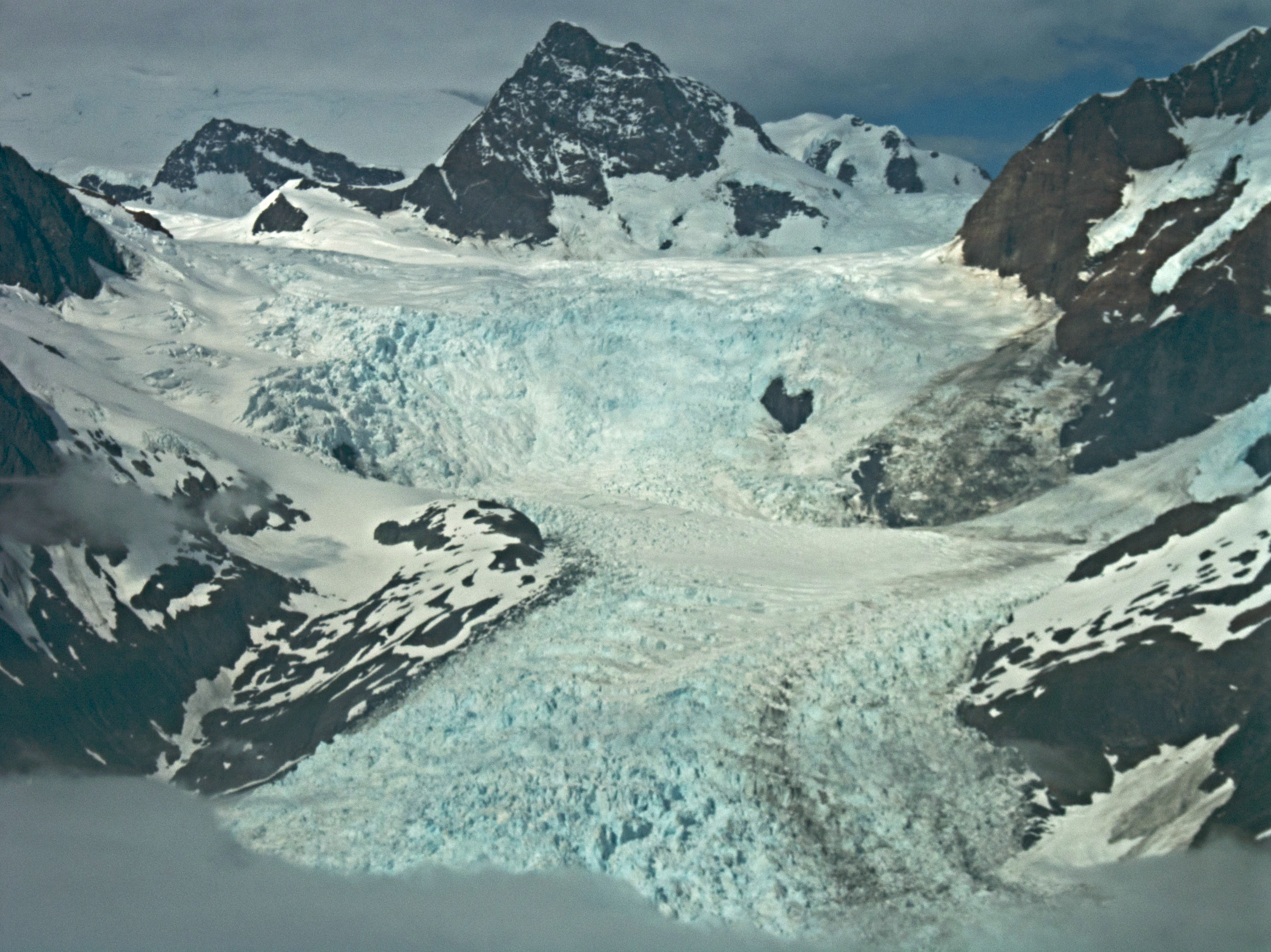
- Mt. Dagelet and La Perouse Glacier

Highest point
- Elevation: 9,800+ ft (2,990+ m)
- Prominence: 1,404 ft (428 m)
- Parent peak: Mount Crillon (12,726 ft)
- Isolation: 2.5 mi (4.0 km)
- Coordinates: 58°35′46″N 137°10′29″W

Geography
- Location within Alaska
- Location: Glacier Bay National Park; Hoonah-Angoon; Alaska, United States
- Parent range: Fairweather Range; Saint Elias Mountains
- Topo map: USGS Mount Fairweather C-4

Climbing
- First ascent: 1933
- Easiest route: Mountaineering

Mount Dagelet is a 9,800+ ft (2,990+ m) glaciated mountain summit located in the Fairweather Range of the Saint Elias Mountains, in southeast Alaska, United States. The peak is situated in Glacier Bay National Park, 4.6 mi (7 km) south of Mount Crillon, and 4 mi (6 km) northwest of Mount La Perouse, which is the nearest highest peak. Topographic relief is significant as the mountain rises up from tidewater in less than nine miles. The mountain was named in 1874 by William Healey Dall of the U.S. Geological Survey, for Joseph Lepaute Dagelet (1751–1788), a French astronomer and mathematician who accompanied Lapérouse when he explored this coastal area in 1786. The first ascent of the peak was made July 29, 1933, by W. S. Child, C. S. Houston, and H. A. Carter.

== Climate ==
Based on the Köppen climate classification, Mount Dagelet has a subarctic climate with cold, snowy winters, and cool summers. Weather systems coming off the Gulf of Alaska are forced upwards by the Fairweather Range (orographic lift), causing heavy precipitation in the form of rainfall and snowfall. Winter temperatures can drop below −20 °C with wind chill factors below −30 °C. This climate supports the La Perouse Glacier to the south. Precipitation runoff and meltwater from its glaciers drains into the Gulf of Alaska. The months May through July offer the most favorable weather for climbing and viewing.

== Gallery ==
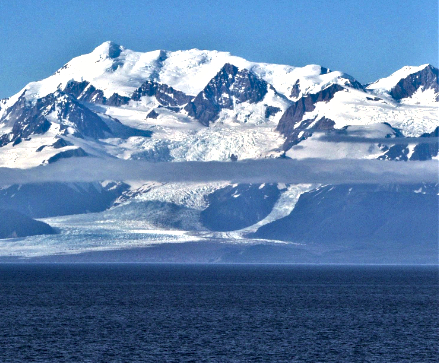
Crillon looming behind Dagelet

== See also ==
- Geography of Alaska
