= Mount Eliza =

Mount Eliza can refer to:

- Mount Eliza, Victoria, a suburb of Melbourne, Australia
- Mount Eliza (Western Australia), a hill in Perth
- Mount Eliza (Fairweather Range), a mountain in Canada
- Mount Eliza (Tasmania), a summit in Southwest National Park, close to Mount Anne
