= Mount La Perouse =

Glaciated mountain summit in Alaska, US

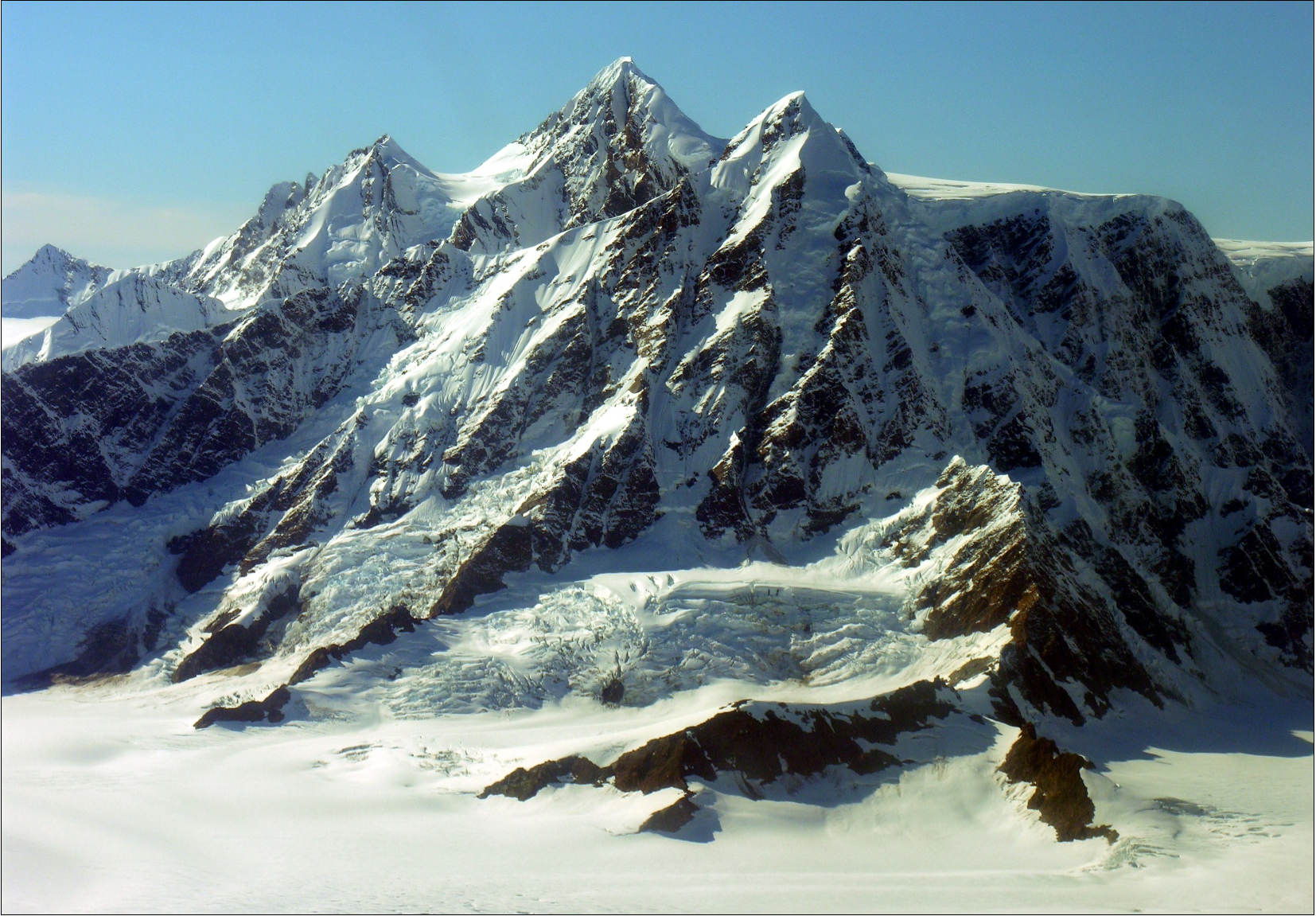
- Mount La Perouse, east aspect

Highest point
- Elevation: 10,728 ft (3,270 m)
- Prominence: 2,778 ft (847 m)
- Parent peak: Mount Crillon (12,726 ft)
- Isolation: 7.07 mi (11.38 km)
- Coordinates: 58°33′46″N 137°04′57″W

Geography
- Location within Alaska
- Interactive map of Mount La Perouse
- Country: United States
- State: Alaska
- Census Area: Hoonah–Angoon
- Protected area: Glacier Bay National Park
- Parent range: Fairweather Range; Saint Elias Mountains
- Topo map: USGS Mount Fairweather C-4

Geology
- Rock type: Gabbro

Climbing
- First ascent: 1952
- Easiest route: Mountaineering

Mount La Perouse is a 10,728-foot (3,270 m) glaciated mountain summit located in the Fairweather Range of the Saint Elias Mountains, in southeast Alaska, United States. The peak is situated in Glacier Bay National Park, 4 mi (6 km) southeast of Mount Dagelet, 7.6 mi (12 km) south-southeast of Mount Crillon which is the nearest higher peak, and 28.6 mi (46 km) southeast of Mount Fairweather, which is the highest peak in the Fairweather Range. Topographic relief is significant as the mountain rises up from tidewater in less than nine miles. The mountain was named in 1874 by William Healey Dall of the U.S. Geological Survey, for Jean-François de Galaup, comte de Lapérouse (1741–1788), a French navigator who explored this coastal area in 1786.

On February 16, 2014, a colossal 68 million ton landslide broke free from the flanks of Mt. La Perouse and flowed nearly 4.6 miles (7.4 km) from where it originated. The months May through June offer the most favorable weather for climbing and viewing.

The first ascent of the peak was made on August 15, 1952 by a USGS party consisting of James Seitz, Karl Stauffer, Rowland Tabor, Rolland Reid, and Paul Bowen.

== Climate ==
Based on the Köppen climate classification, Mount La Perouse has a subarctic climate with cold, snowy winters, and mild summers. Temperatures can drop below −4 °F (−20 °C) with wind chill factors below −22 °F (−30 °C). This climate supports hanging glaciers on its slopes as well as the immense Brady Glacier to the east, Finger Glacier to the south, and La Perouse Glacier to the north and west. Precipitation runoff and meltwater from its glaciers drains into the Gulf of Alaska.

== Gallery ==
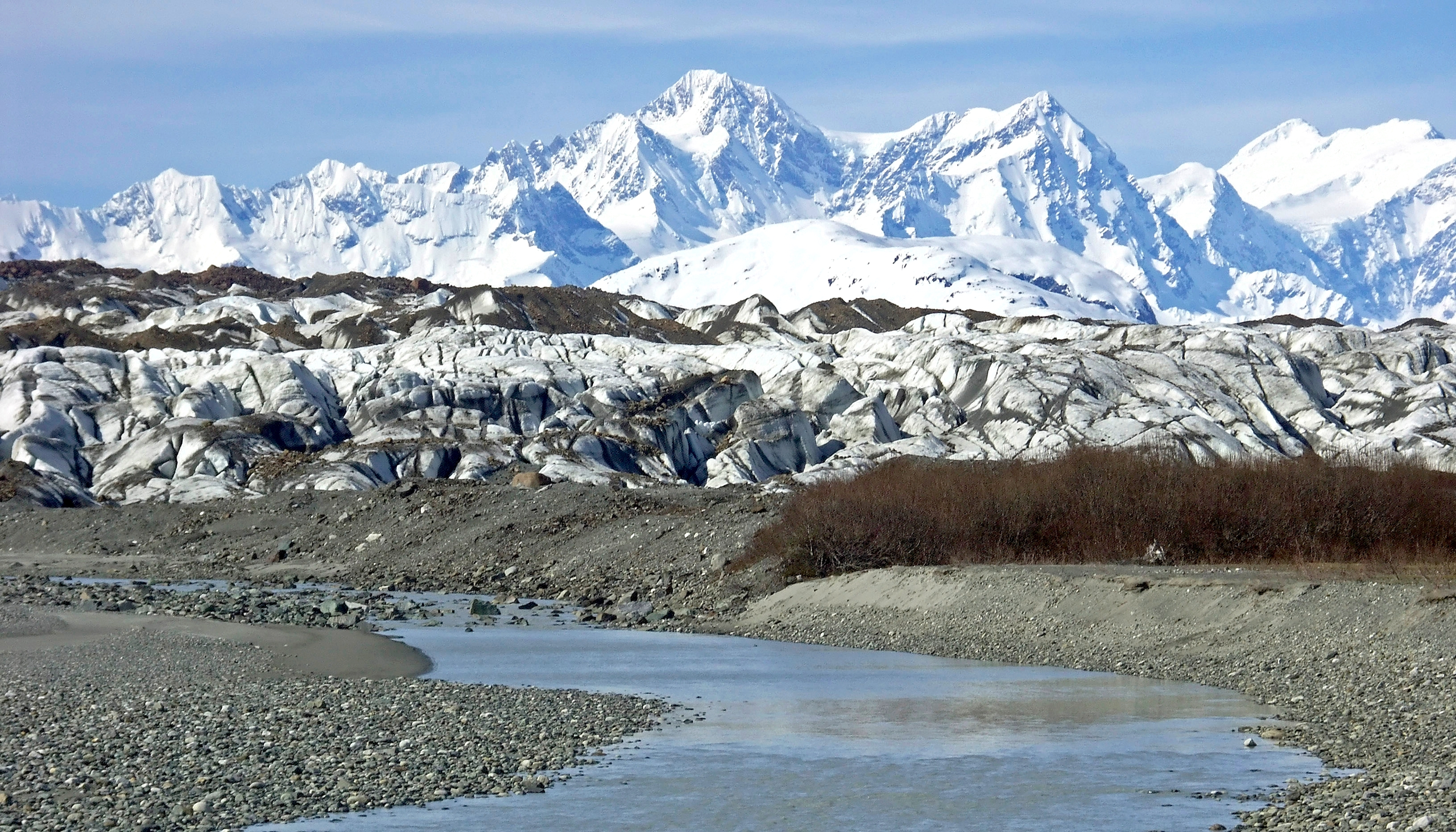
Brady Glacier / Mt. La Perouse

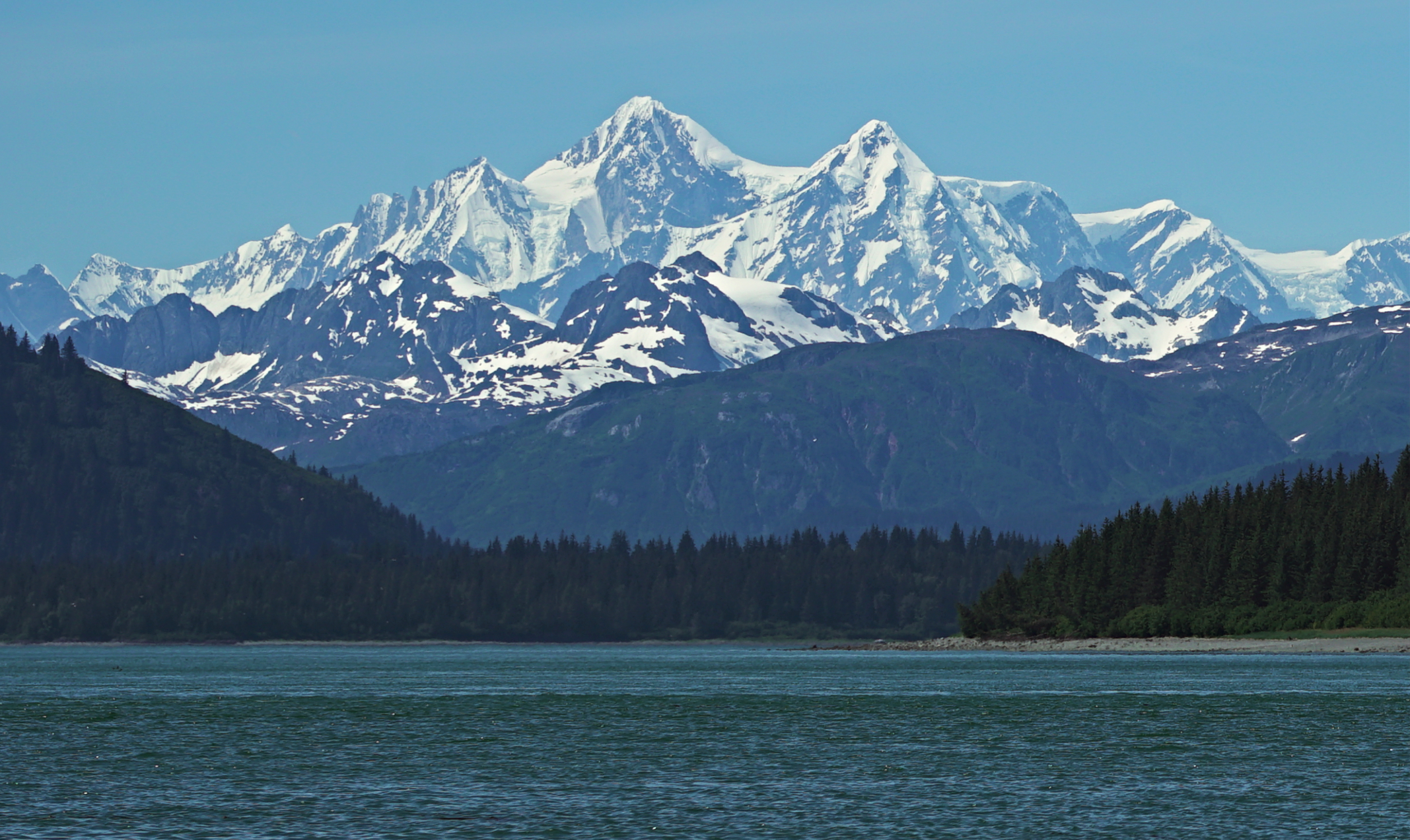

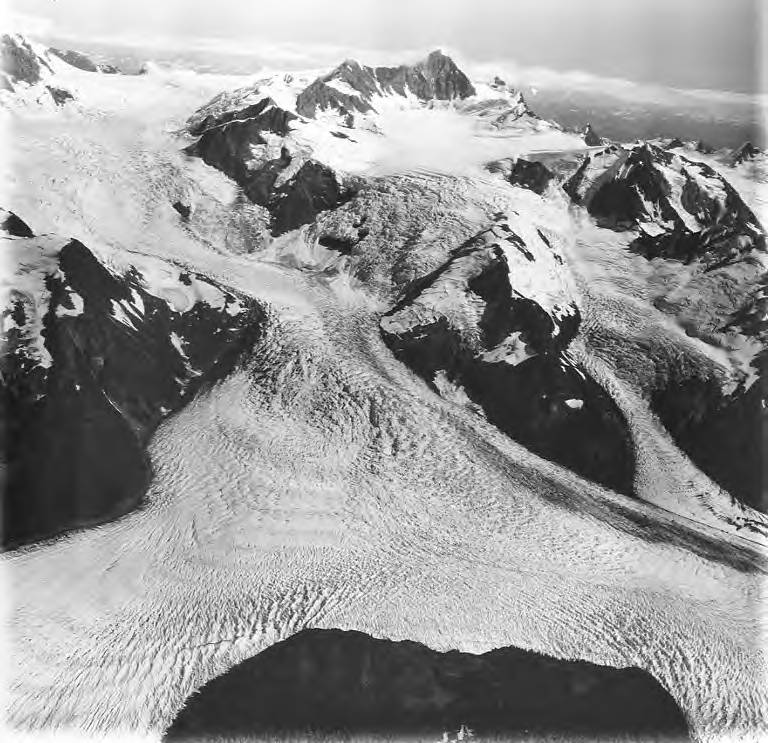
Mt. La Perouse / La Perouse Glacier by Austin Post. 1977

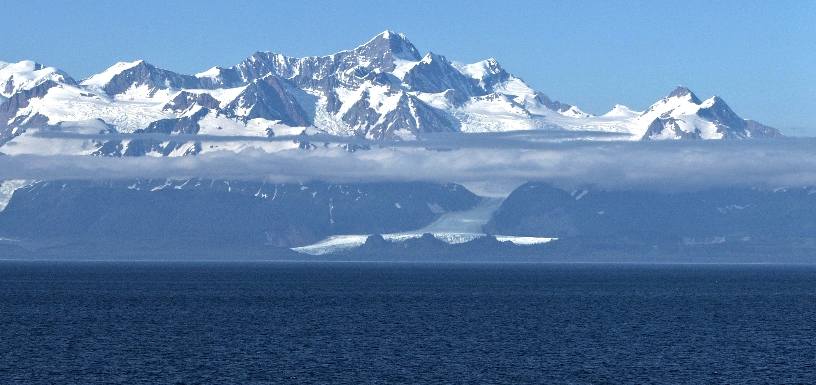
Mount La Perouse with Finger Glacier, from southwest

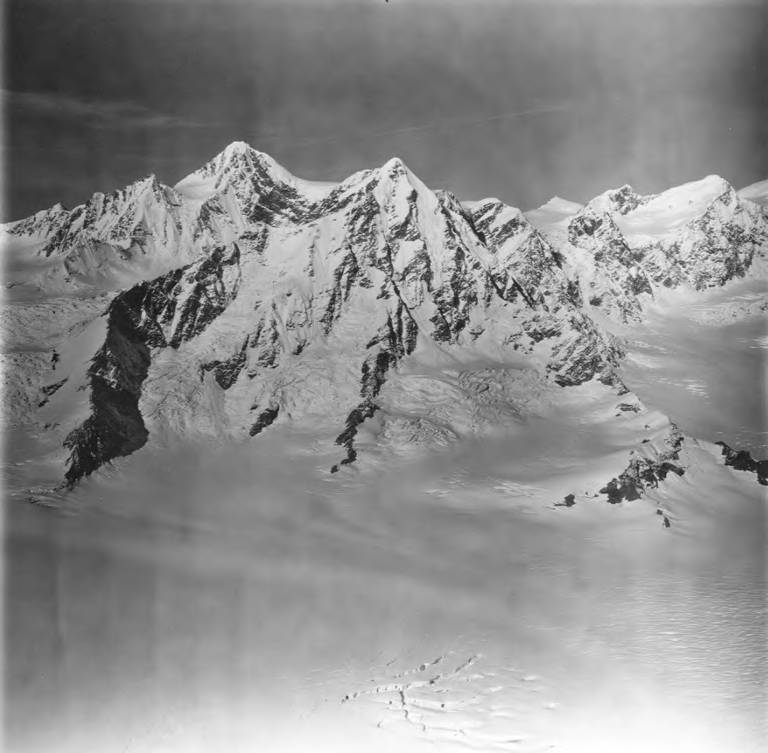
Mount La Perouse and Brady Glacier. 1973

== See also ==
- Geography of Alaska
