= Abyss Lake =

Lake in Alaska, United States

- Location within Alaska
- Location: Southeastern Alaska
- Coordinates: 58°30′31″N 136°36′55″W
- Primary inflows: Brady Glacier
- Primary outflows: Dundas River
- Basin countries: United States
- Surface elevation: 883 ft (269 m)

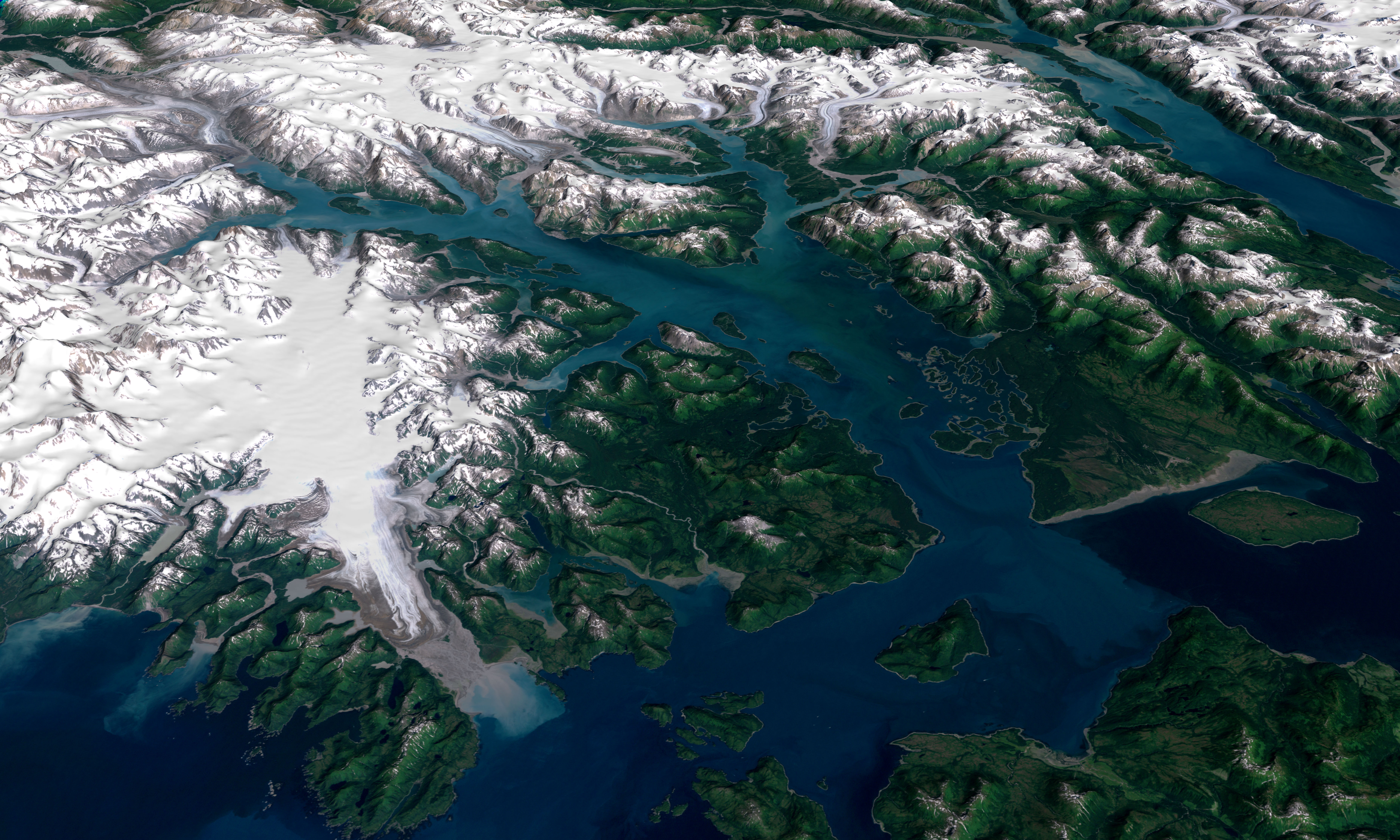
A Landsat image of part of the Glacier Bay National Park and Preserve, with the Brady Glacier in the left foreground, August 1, 1999.

Abyss Lake is a lake in southeastern Alaska. Lying on the eastern side of the Brady Glacier, it receives meltwater from it, which in turn flows into the Dundas River, Dundas Bay, Cross Sound and thence into the Pacific.

A part of the Glacier Bay National Park and Preserve, its water is regularly blocked by an ice dam. When such a dam breaks in a glacial lake outburst flood, much of the lake's water is propelled into Dundas Bay, along with trees, ice chunks, and sediment. This has occurred in 1994, 1997, 1998, 2000, 2001, 2005, and again in September 2006.
