= Mount Wilbur =

Mount Wilbur may refer to:

- Mount Wilbur (Montana) in Montana, United States
- Mount Wilbur (Alaska) in Alaska, United States
- Mount Wilbur (Antarctica) in Antarctica
