= Mount Wilbur (Alaska) =

Mountain in Alaska, United States

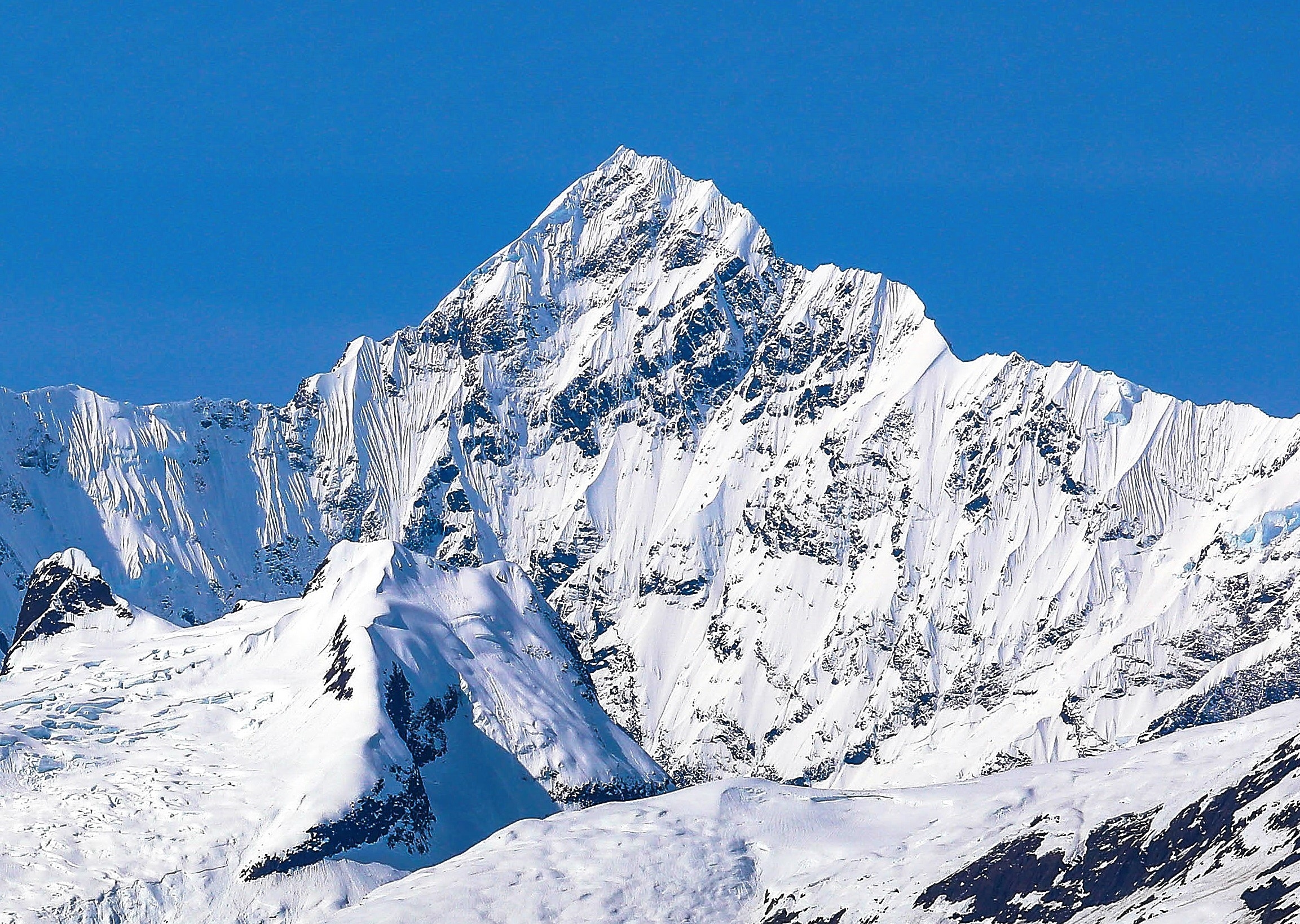
- Northeast aspect

Highest point
- Elevation: 10,821 ft (3,298 m)
- Prominence: 2,202 ft (671 m)
- Parent peak: Lituya Mountain
- Isolation: 6.20 mi (9.98 km)
- Coordinates: 58°44′23″N 137°19′04″W

Naming
- Etymology: Wilbur Wright (1867–1912)

Geography
- Location within Alaska
- Country: United States
- State: Alaska
- Census Area: Hoonah–Angoon
- Protected area: Glacier Bay National Park and Preserve
- Parent range: Fairweather Range; Saint Elias Mountains
- Topo map: USGS Mount Fairweather C-4

Climbing
- First ascent: May 23, 1975 by David Jones, Clark Gerhardt, Craig McKibben, Gregory Markov
- Easiest route: snow/ice climb

Mount Wilbur is a 10,821-foot (3,298 m) peak of the Fairweather Range, the southernmost part of the Saint Elias Mountains. It lies approximately 14 mi (23 km) southeast of Mount Fairweather and 8 mi (13 km) northwest of Mount Crillon. It is set within Glacier Bay National Park. The peak is the higher of a pair of peaks, Mounts Wilbur and Orville, named after the Wright brothers who invented the airplane, the form of transportation that contributed greatly to the development of Alaska. The mountain's toponym was officially adopted in 1967 by the United States Board on Geographic Names.

Though not a particularly high peak in absolute terms, Mount Wilbur does stand quite high above local terrain, due to its proximity to the ocean: the summit is only 7.5 mi (12.1 km) from tidewater at the head of Lituya Bay to the southwest.

== Gallery ==
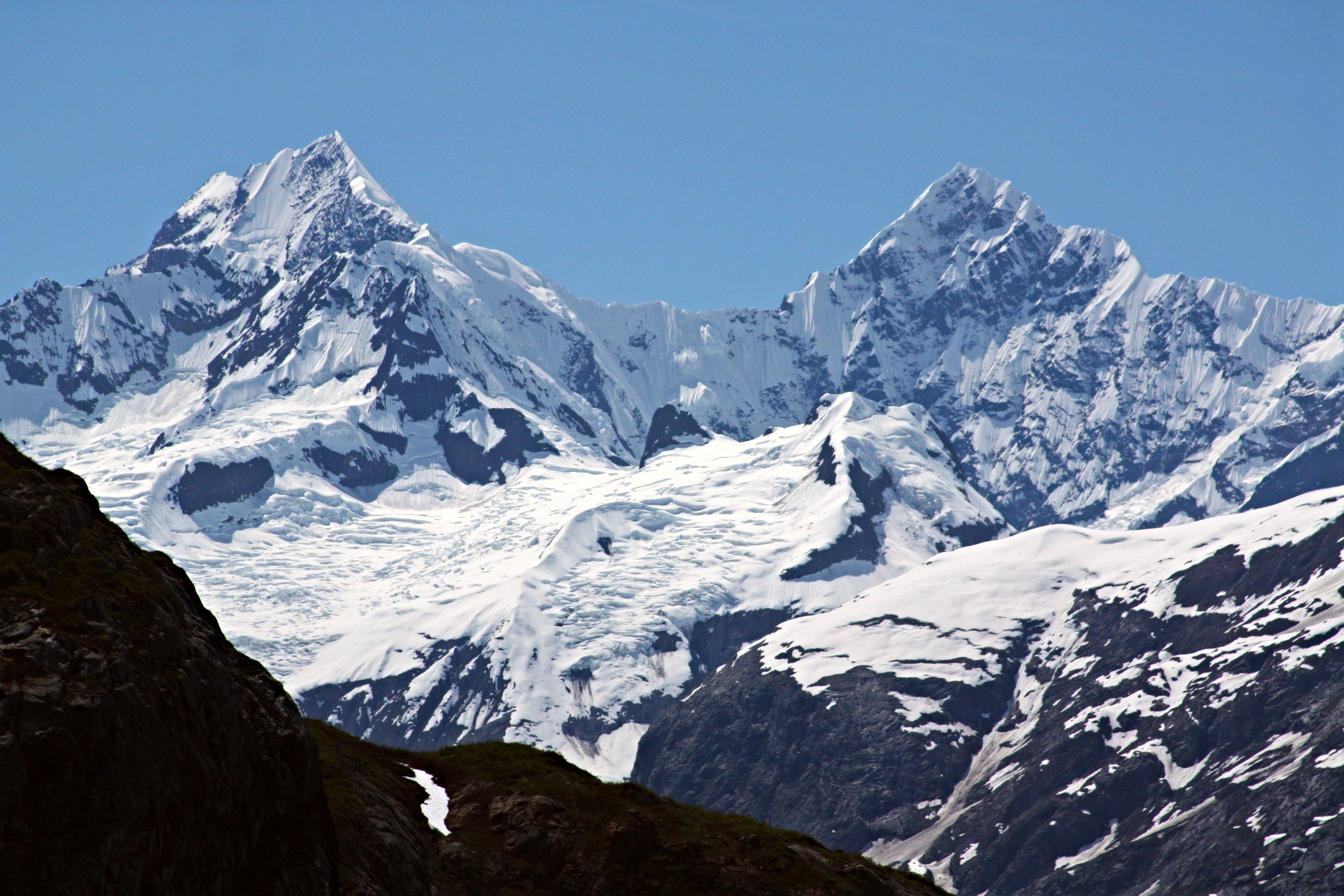
Mts. Orville and Wilbur

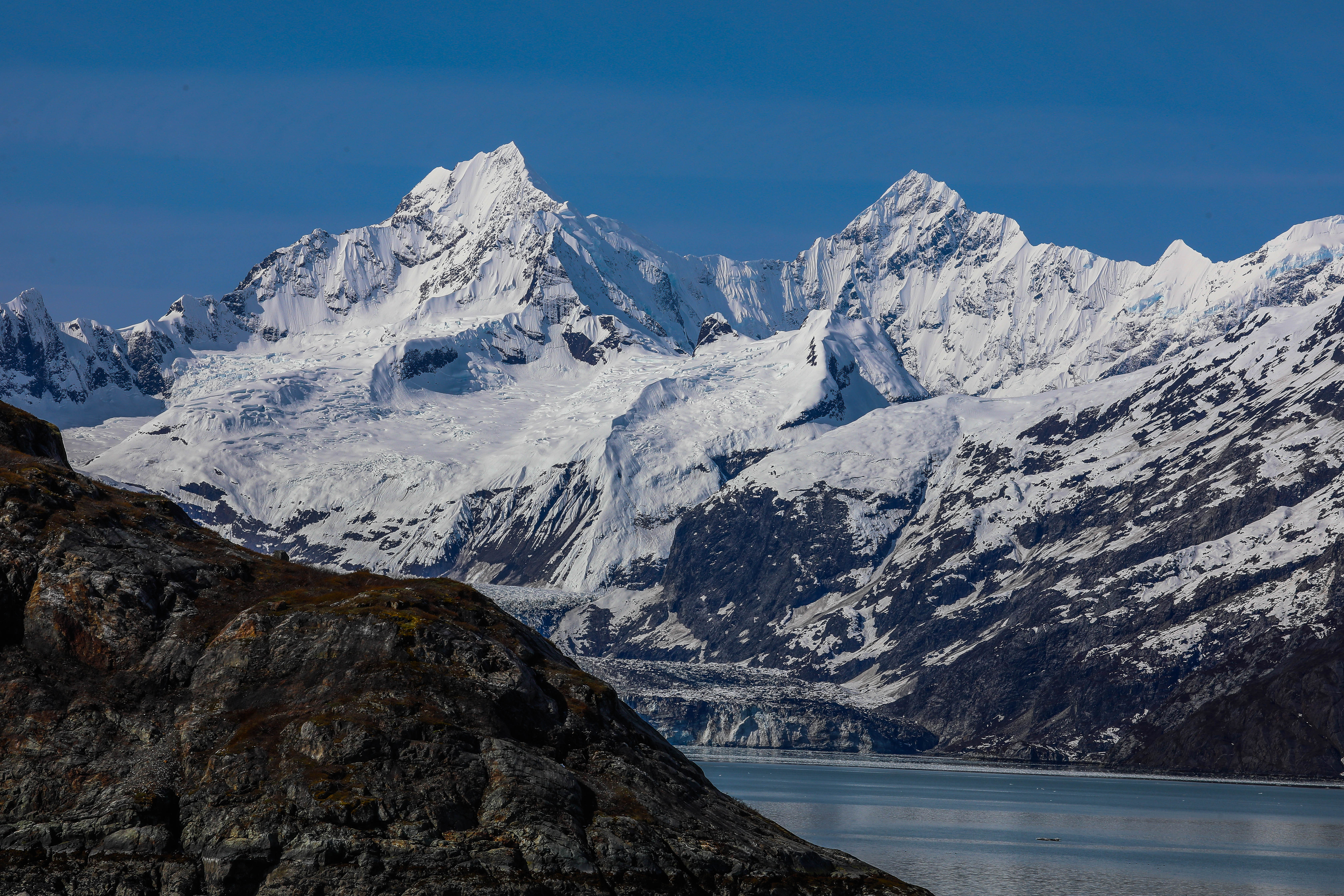
Mount Orville (left) and Mount Wilbur (right)
