= H. Adams Carter =

American mountain climber (1914–1995)

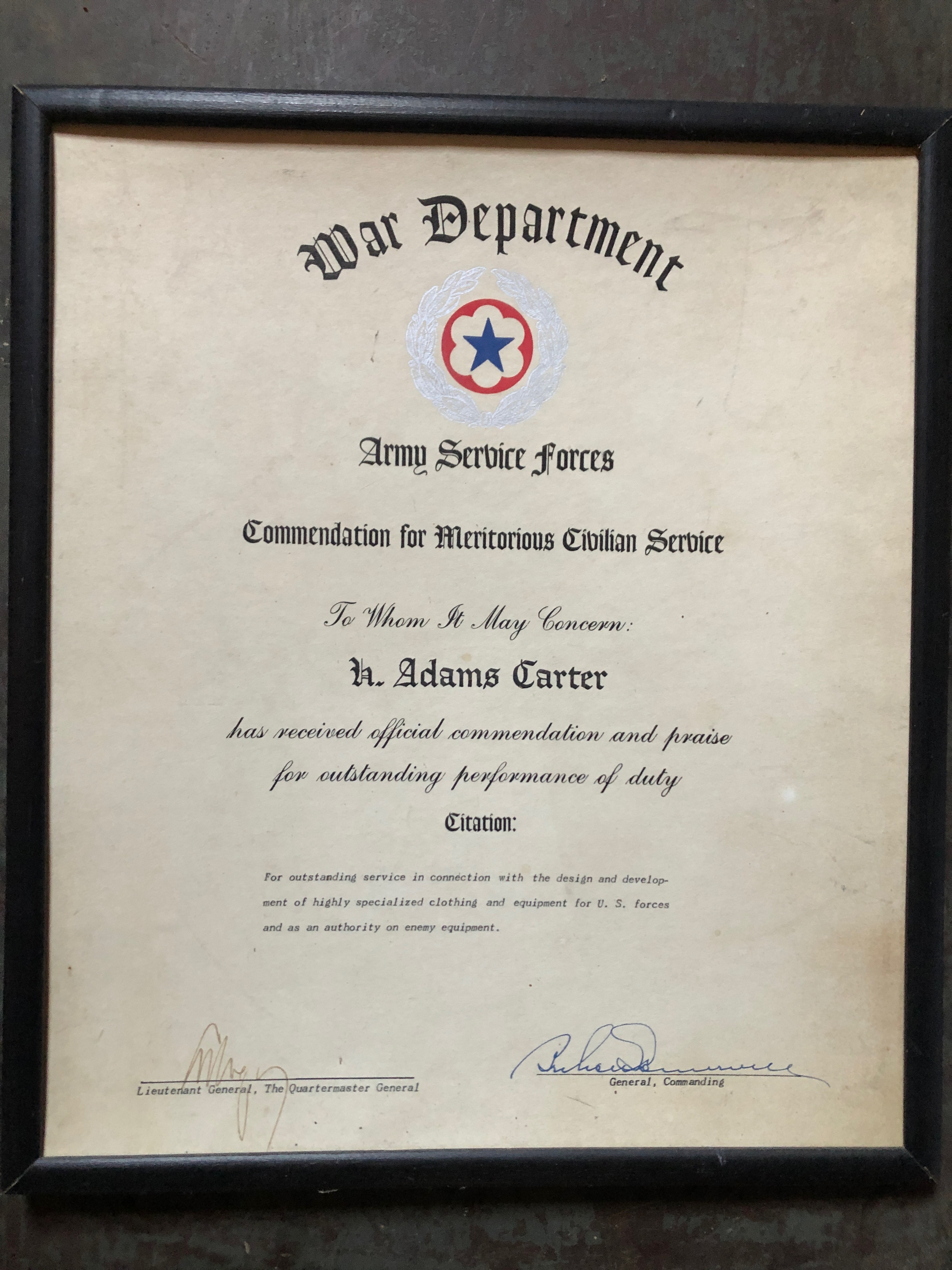
Commendation for Meritorious Civilian Service

Hubert Adams "Ad" Carter (June 6, 1914 – April 1, 1995) was an American mountaineer, language teacher and was editor of the American Alpine Journal for 35 years.

== Biography ==
Carter was born in Newton, Massachusetts in 1914, and made his first ascent of Mount Washington (1,917 metres) at the age of five. He graduated from Milton Academy in Milton, Massachusetts in 1932 and from Harvard College in 1936.

In 1934, Carter participated with Bradford Washburn in the first ascent of Mount Crillon (3,879 m) in Alaska. In 1936, he was a member of the British–American Himalayan Expedition that made the first ascent of Nanda Devi (7,816 m) in India, which remained the highest mountain ever climbed until 1950.

Carter also became a member of the United States Ski Team, competing in the Alpine World Skiing Championships in 1937, and the Panamerican championships in 1938.

During World War II, Carter assisted in the creation and training of the 10th Mountain Division. He translated material in German, French, Spanish, and Italian for use in writing the first Army manuals on mountain warfare, and developing equipment. Carter also interrogated German and Japanese POWs. In 1945, Carter was awarded a Commendation for Meritorious Civilian Service for his wartime service.

After receiving a master's degree from Middlebury College in 1947, Carter returned to Milton Academy, where he taught French, German and Spanish until his retirement in 1979. He also founded the school's Ski and Mountaineering Club, which has become the H. Adams Carter Outdoor Program. Carter often used his second home in Jefferson, New Hampshire as a base camp for school trips to the White Mountains.

Carter served as an officer of the American Alpine Club from 1954 to 1958 and as editor of the American Alpine Journal from 1960 to 1995. Under his tenure as editor the Journal became one of the pre-eminent worldwide journals of record for mountaineering. He continued to participate in mountaineering expeditions, including one to survey Ojos del Salado (6,893 m) in 1956, several trips to the Cordillera Blanca in Peru, and a second expedition to Nanda Devi in 1976, which he co-led with Louis Reichardt and Willi Unsoeld.

Due to his long work as editor of the American Alpine Journal, Carter became an important chronicler of mountaineering.

He was married to Ann Brooks Carter (1918-2012), also a climber and mountaineer.

== Notable ascents ==
- 1934 East Ridge above the Plateau, Mount Crillon, Fairweather Range, Alaska, USA. FA of peak with Bradford Washburn, summit attained July 19, 1934.
