= Mount Orville =

Mountain in Alaska, U.S.

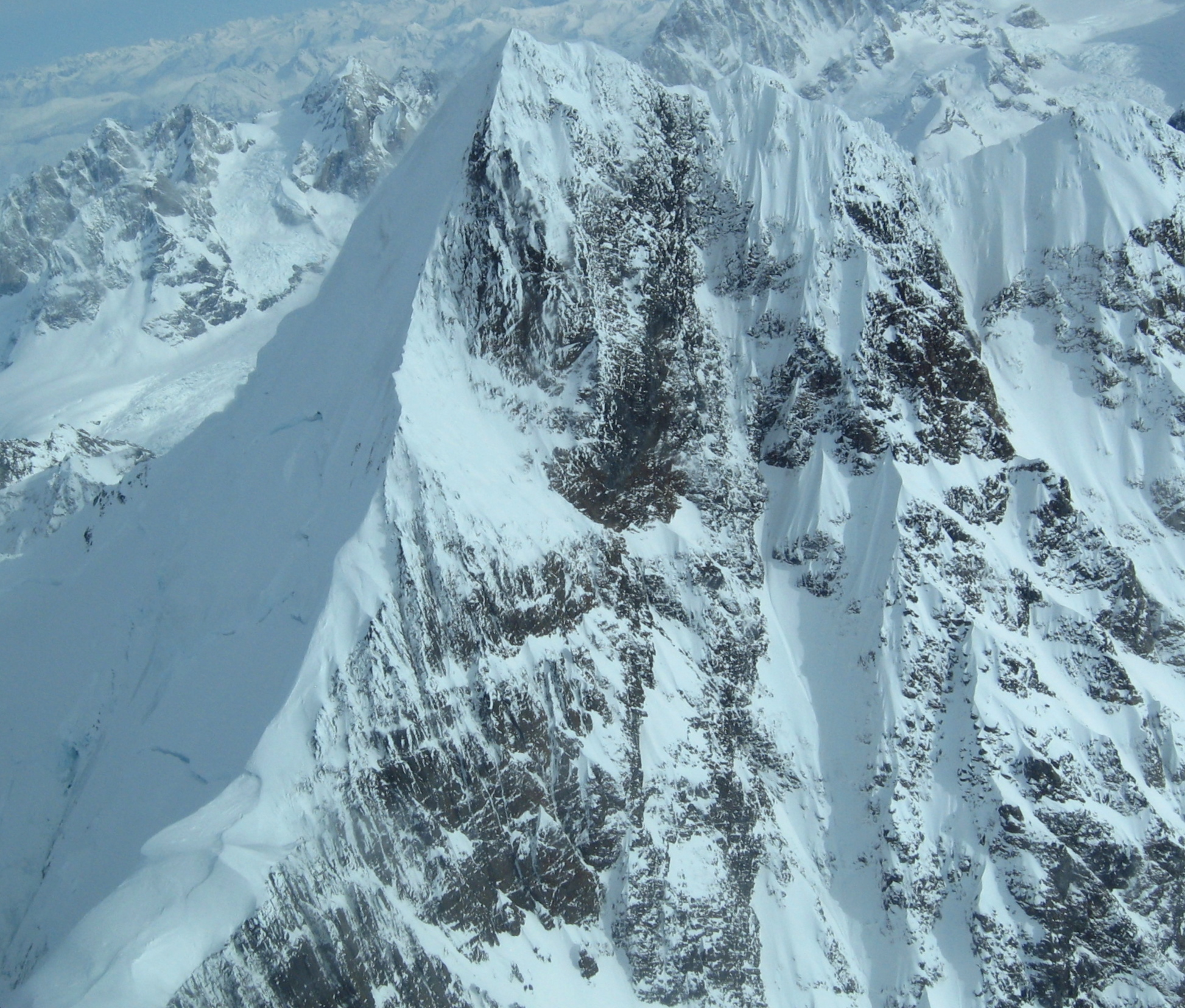

Highest point
- Elevation: 10,495 ft (3,199 m)
- Prominence: 1,795 ft (547 m)
- Parent peak: Mount Wilbur
- Isolation: 1.65 mi (2.66 km)
- Coordinates: 58°44′10″N 137°16′20″W

Geography
- Location within Alaska
- Interactive map of Mount Orville
- Country: United States
- State: Alaska
- Census Area: Hoonah–Angoon
- Protected area: Glacier Bay National Park
- Parent range: Fairweather Range; Saint Elias Mountains
- Topo map: USGS Mount Fairweather C-4

Climbing
- First ascent: 1995 by Steve Carroll, Philip Kauffman, and Patrick Simmons
- Easiest route: snow/ice climb

Mount Orville is a high peak of the Fairweather Range, the southernmost part of the Saint Elias Mountains. It is included in Glacier Bay National Park. The peak is the lower of a pair of peaks, Mounts Wilbur and Orville, named after the Wright Brothers. The mountain's name was proposed to the National Park Service by Senator Ernest Gruening in 1961 to honor Orville Wright (1871–1948) who, with his brother Wilbur, invented the airplane, a form of transportation which contributed to the development of Alaska. The toponym was officially adopted in 1962 by the U.S. Board on Geographic Names.

Though not a particularly high peak in absolute terms, Mount Orville does stand quite high above local terrain, due to its proximity to the ocean: the summit is only 7.5 miles from tidewater at the head of Lituya Bay to the southwest.

== Ascents ==
The first summit was achieved in April 1995 by seasoned climbers Steven Carroll, Philip Kauffman, and Patrick Simmons. Despite the climbers' preparedness and experience, the climb was ill-fated. The three climbers were killed in an avalanche, on the descent, that was caused by unseasonable changes in weather conditions. The Park Service reported a successful summit in 2006 via the South Ridge, but no details were available.

== Climate ==
Based on the Köppen climate classification, Mount Orville is located in a tundra climate zone, with long, cold, snowy winters, and cool summers. Weather systems coming off the Gulf of Alaska are forced upwards by the Saint Elias Mountains (orographic lift), causing heavy precipitation in the form of rainfall and snowfall. Winter temperatures can drop below 0 °F with wind chill factors below −10 °F.

== Gallery ==
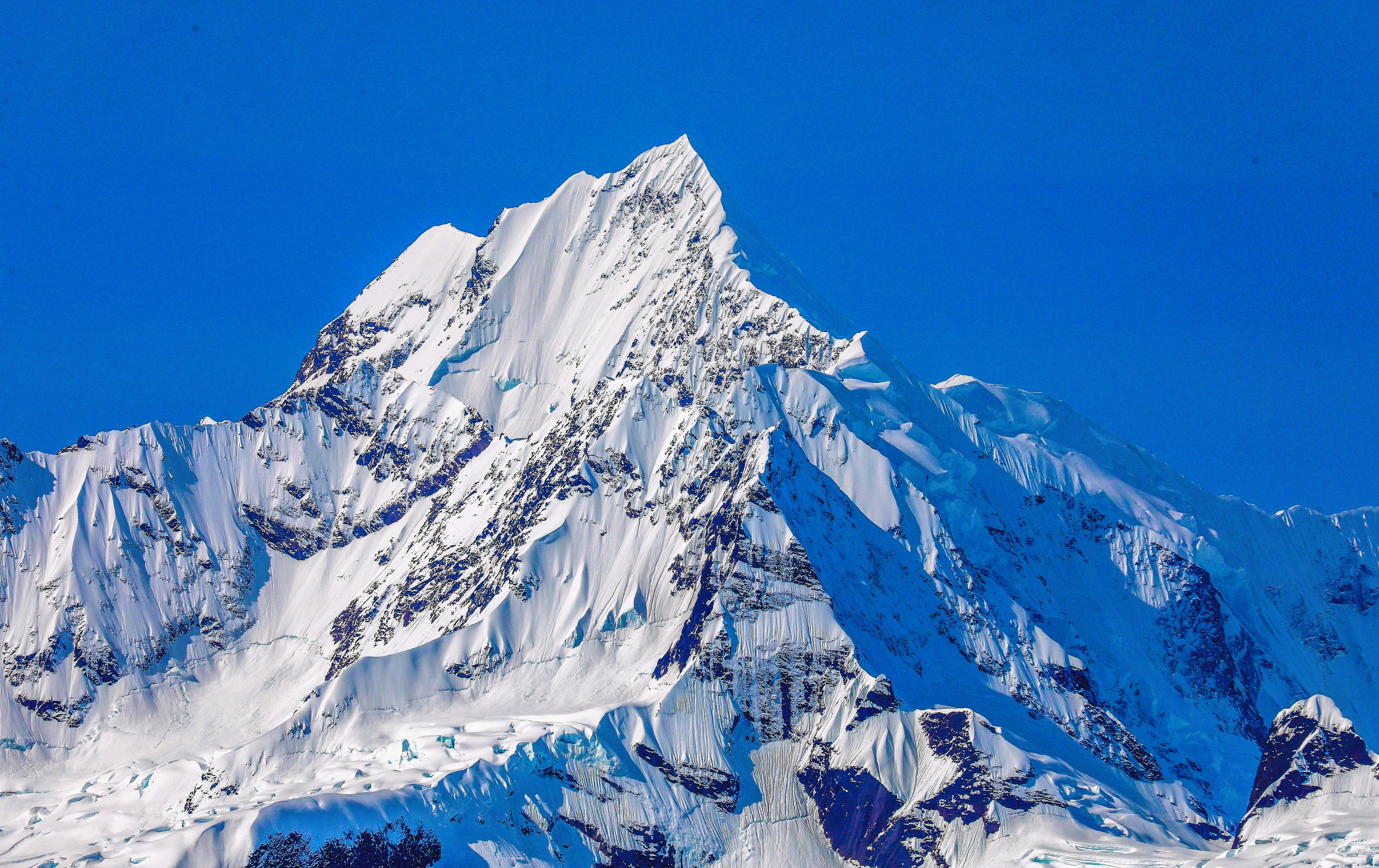
Northeast aspect

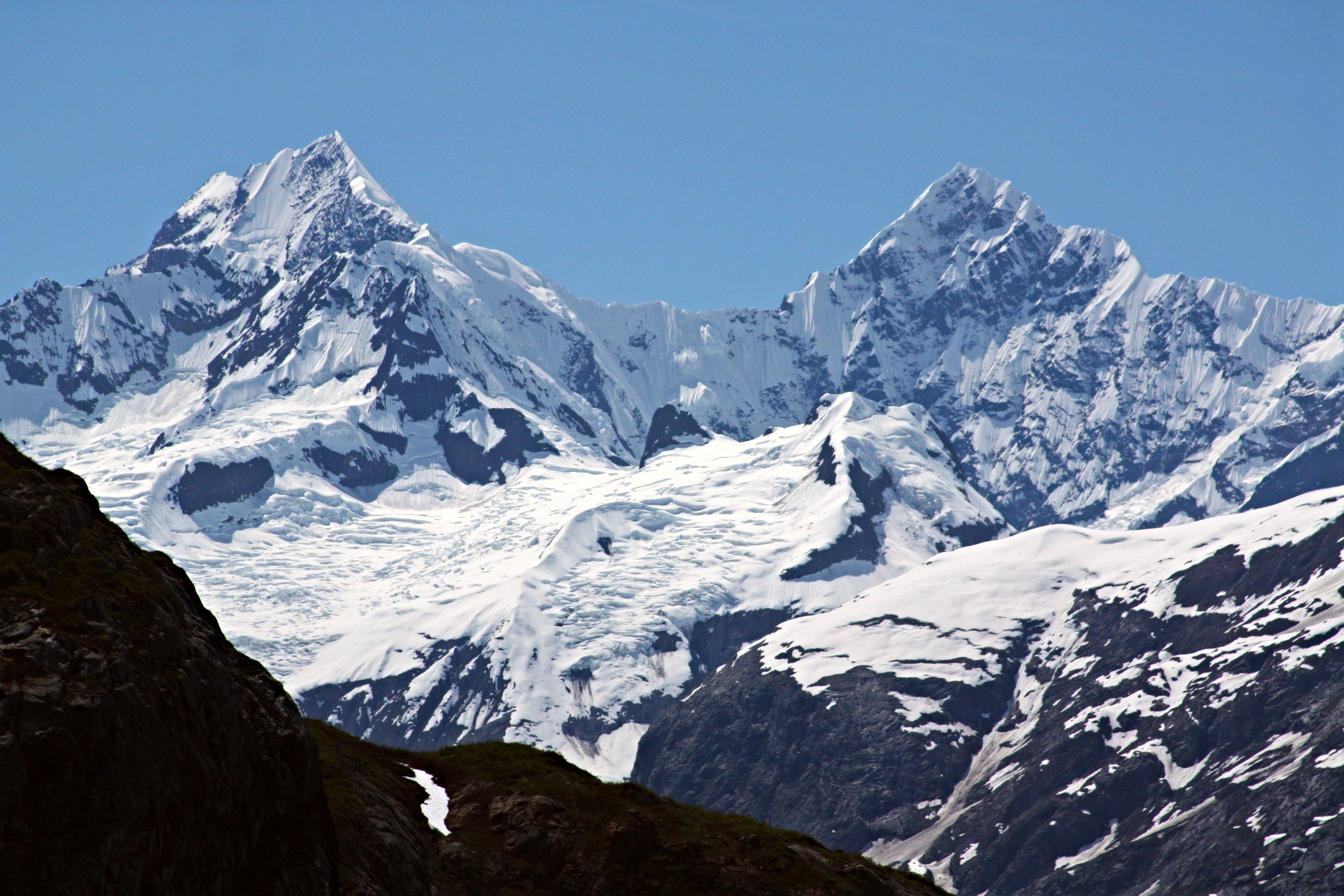
Mounts Orville and Wilbur seen from Johns Hopkins Inlet in Glacier Bay

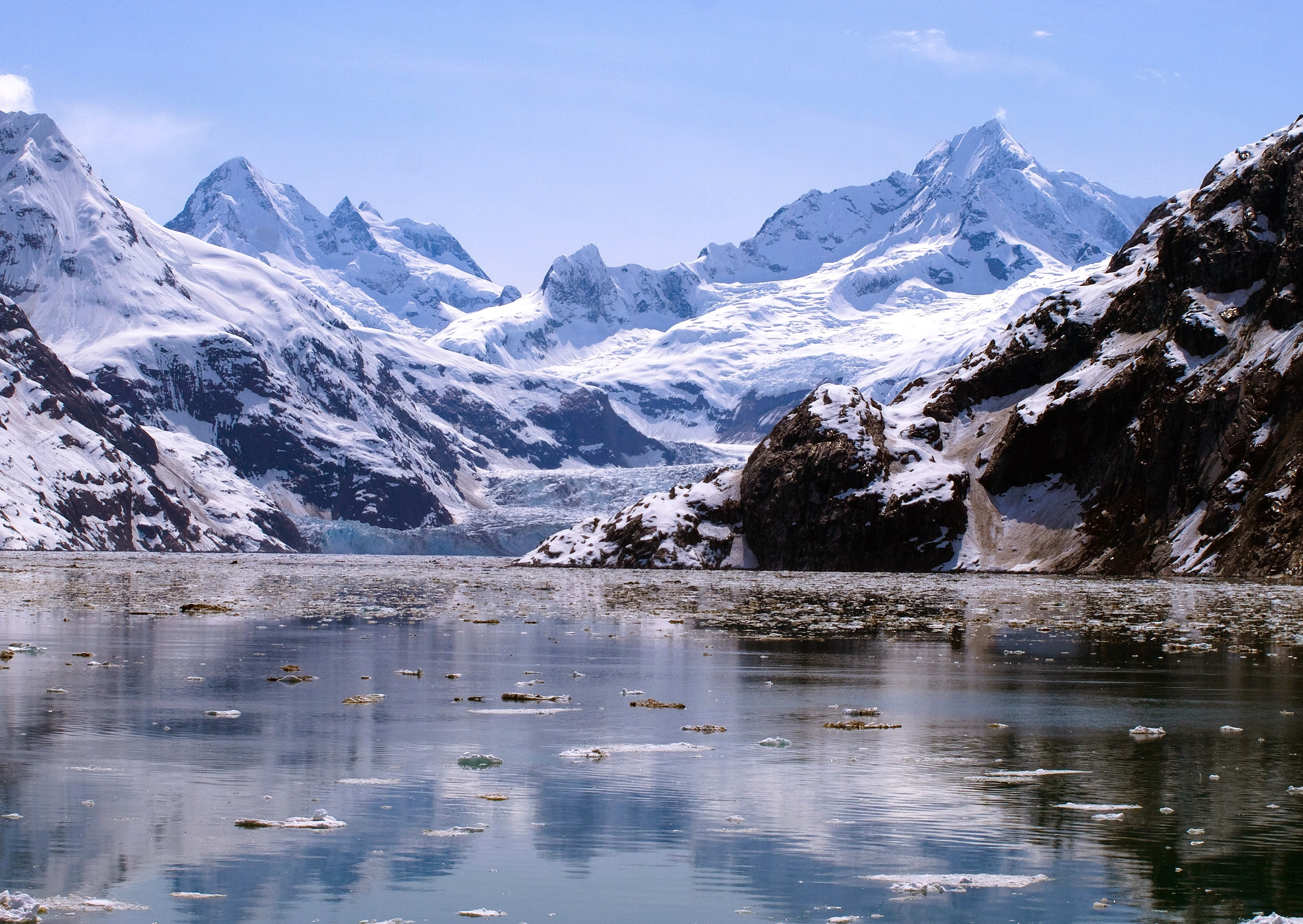
Fifty Years of Alaskan Statehood (left) and Mount Orville (right) viewed from Johns Hopkins Inlet

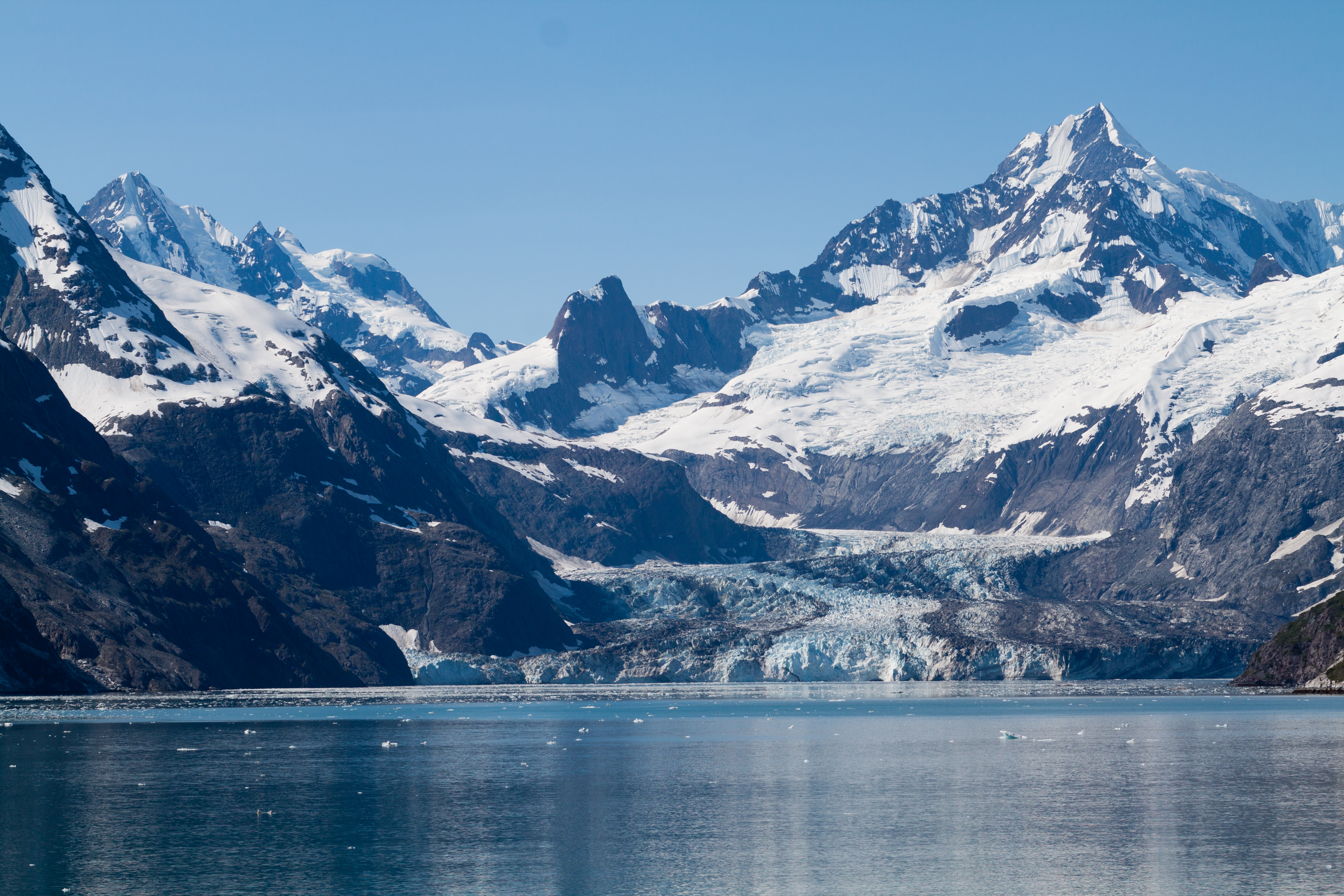
Fifty Years of Alaskan Statehood (left) and Mount Orville (right) from Johns Hopkins Inlet
