= Mount Eliza (Fairweather Range) =

Mountain in British Columbia, Canada

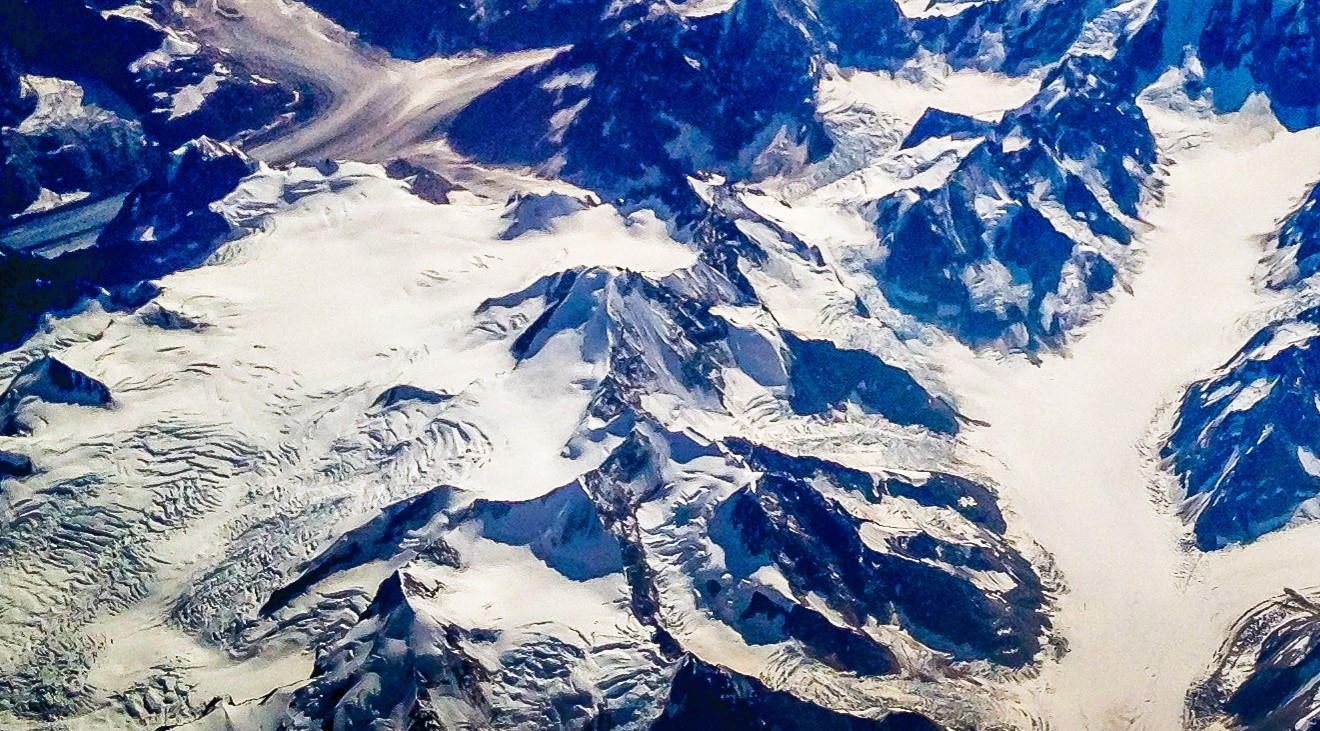
- Aerial view, North aspect, summit centered

Highest point
- Elevation: 2,954 m (9,692 ft)
- Prominence: 947 m (3,107 ft)
- Parent peak: Mount Fairweather (4,671 m)
- Isolation: 7.08 km (4.40 mi)
- Coordinates: 59°05′48″N 137°23′39″W

Geography
- Location within British Columbia Location within Canada
- Interactive map of Mount Eliza
- Country: Canada
- Province: British Columbia
- District: Cassiar Land District
- Protected area: Tatshenshini-Alsek Provincial Park
- Parent range: Fairweather Range; Saint Elias Mountains
- Topo map: NTS 114P5 Konamoxt Glacier

Mount Eliza is a 2,954-metre (9,692-foot) mountain summit in British Columbia, Canada.

== Description ==
Mount Eliza is located in the Fairweather Range and it ranks as the fourth-highest peak within Tatshenshini-Alsek Provincial Park. Topographic relief is significant as the west slope rises approximately 1,450 metres (4,757 ft) in two kilometres (1.2 mile). Precipitation runoff and glacial meltwater from the mountain drains to Glacier Bay. The mountain's toponym was officially adopted in 1924 by the Geographical Names Board of Canada, following recommendation by surveyor John Davidson Craig of the International Boundary Survey. Mount Eliza is set seven kilometres from the Canada–US border and Glacier Bay National Park.

== Climate ==
Based on the Köppen climate classification, Mount Eliza is located in a tundra climate zone with cold, snowy winters, and cool summers. Weather systems coming off the Gulf of Alaska are forced upwards by the Fairweather Range (orographic lift), causing heavy precipitation in the form of rainfall and snowfall. Winter temperatures can drop below −20 °C with wind chill factors below −30 °C. This climate supports the Eliza, Ferris, and Grand Pacific glaciers surrounding the mountain.

== See also ==
- Geography of British Columbia
- Eliza Ruhamah Scidmore
