= Mount Crillon =

Mountain in Alaska, United States

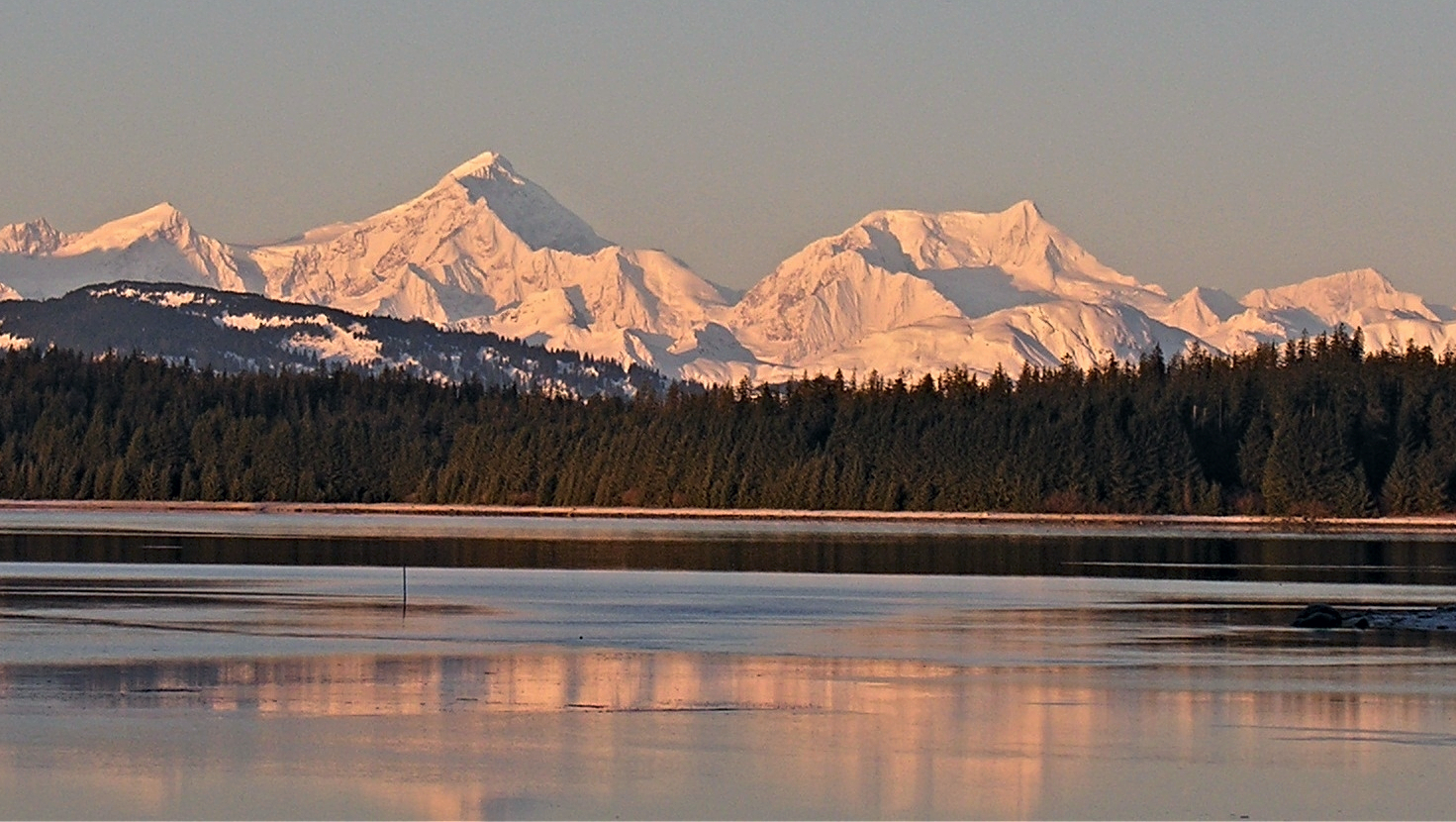
- Mt. Crillon (left) and Mt. Bertha (right) seen from park headquarters

Highest point
- Elevation: 12,726 ft (3,879 m)
- Prominence: 7,214 ft (2,199 m)
- Listing: North America prominent peak 68th
- Coordinates: 58°39′46″N 137°10′19″W

Geography
- Location within Alaska
- Interactive map of Mount Crillon
- Location: Glacier Bay National Park, Hoonah-Angoon Census Area, Alaska, U.S.
- Parent range: Fairweather Range, Saint Elias Mountains
- Topo map: USGS Mount Fairweather C-4 Quadrangle

Climbing
- First ascent: 1934 by Bradford Washburn, H. Adams Carter
- Easiest route: West ridge: glacier/snow/ice/rock climb (Alaska Grade 4)

Mount Crillon is a high peak of the Fairweather Range, the southernmost part of the Saint Elias Mountains. It lies southeast of Mount Fairweather, in the promontory between the Gulf of Alaska and Glacier Bay. It is included in Glacier Bay National Park. The peak was named after Felix-Francois-Dorothee de Bretton, Comte de Crillon, by his friend, the French explorer Jean Francois de Galaup de la Perouse.

== Location ==
Mount Crillon lies about 20 mi (32 km) southeast of Mount Fairweather. It is near the southern end of the Fairweather Range, with only one 10,000 ft (3,000 m) peak, Mount La Perouse, lying south of it. It is 10 mi (16 km) due east of the head of Lituya Bay, a small inlet of the Gulf of Alaska, which is itself part of the Pacific Ocean. The North and South Crillon Glaciers flow west from the peak toward Lituya Bay. The La Perouse Glacier flows south from the peak. The north side of the peak forms the head of the southern branch of the Johns Hopkins Glacier, which empties into Johns Hopkins Inlet, off of Glacier Bay. To the east of the peak lies the large icefield which forms the head of the Brady Glacier, the southernmost of the large glaciers of the Saint Elias Mountains.

== Features ==
Mount Crillon drops 9,000 feet (2,700 m) in less than 4 mi (6.4 km) on both its north and west faces. Due to its proximity to the ocean, it is often subject to harsh weather.

== Climbing ==
Mount Crillon is not climbed frequently, since it is an extremely challenging climb for its elevation due to its isolation. The first ascent was in 1934, by explorer Bradford Washburn on his third attempt, and longtime editor of the American Alpine Journal H. Adams Carter. They climbed via the East Ridge above the Plateau, reaching the summit on 19 July 1934.

== Climate ==
Based on the Köppen climate classification, Mount Crillon has a subarctic climate with cold, snowy winters, and mild summers. Temperatures can drop below −20 °C with wind chill factors below −30 °C. Precipitation runoff and meltwater from its glaciers drains into Glacier Bay and the Gulf of Alaska.

== Gallery ==
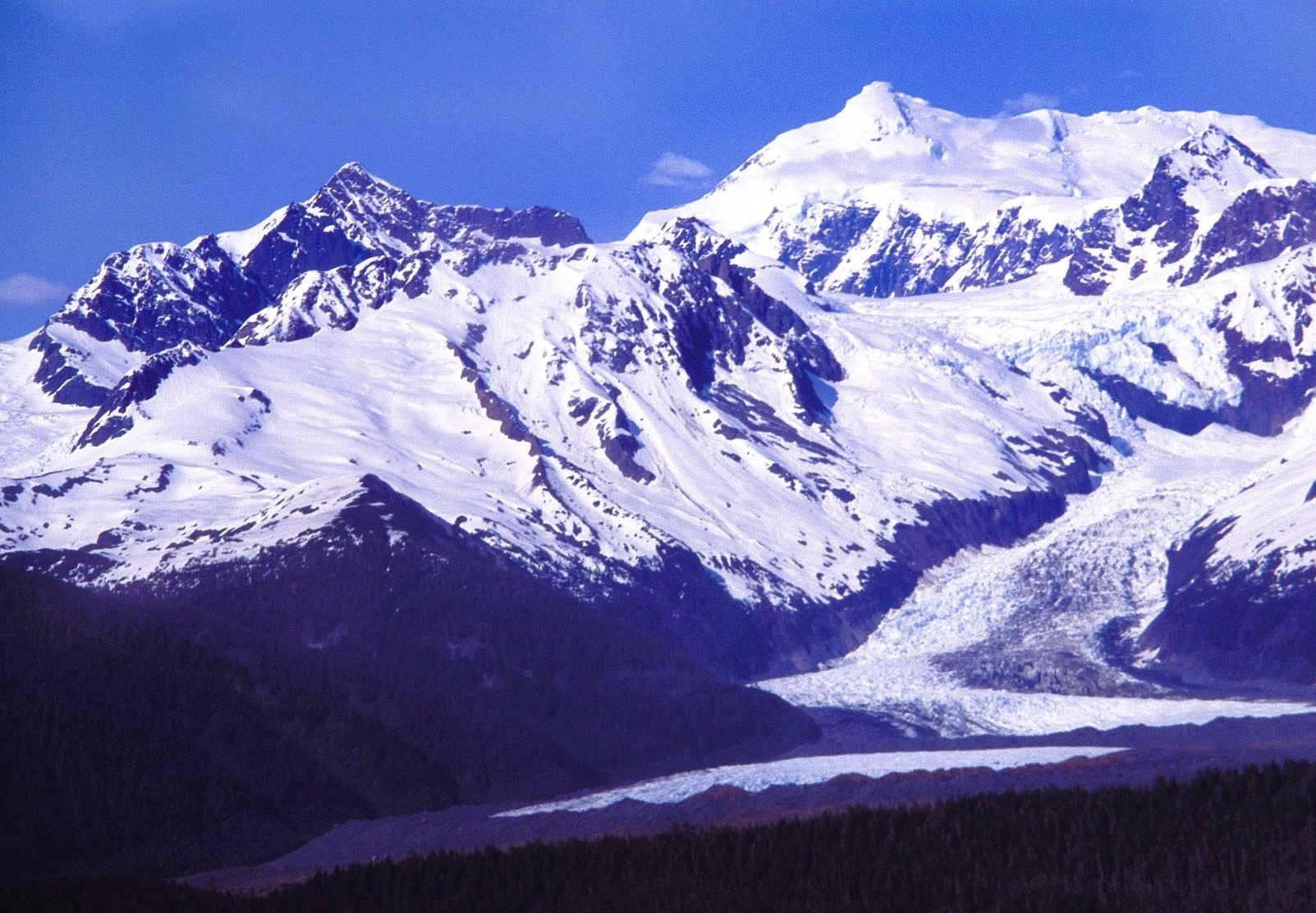
Mount Crillon from the southwest
(Mount Klooch to left}

== See also ==
- List of mountain peaks of North America
  - List of mountain peaks of the United States
    - List of mountain peaks of Alaska
- List of Ultras of the United States

== Sources ==
- Wood, Michael; Coombs, Colby (2001). Alaska: A Climbing Guide. The Mountaineers.

Bates, Robert. The Love of Mountains is Best: Climbs and Travels From K2 to Kathmandu. Portsmouth, NH: Peter E. Randall Publisher, 1994, 22-39. ISBN 0-914339-50-8
