= Fairweather Range =

Mountain range on the U.S.–Canada border

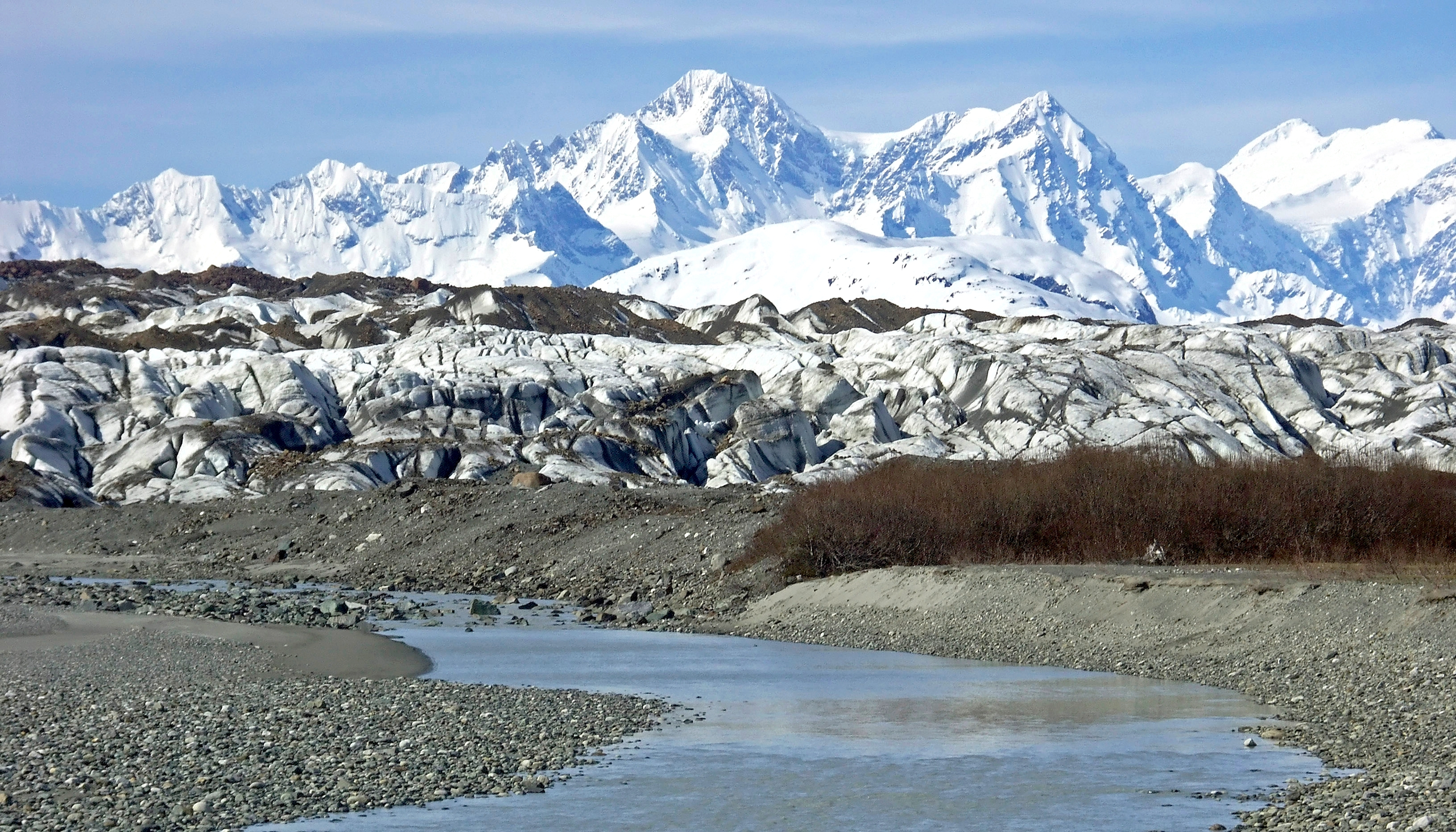
- Brady Glacier of the Fairweather Range

Highest point
- Peak: Mount Fairweather
- Elevation: 4,671 m (15,325 ft)
- Coordinates: 58°54′26″N 137°31′36″W

Dimensions
- Area: 9,936 km^{2} (3,836 mi^{2})

Geography
- Location within Alaska Location within British Columbia
- Countries: United States and Canada
- State/Province: Alaska and British Columbia
- Range coordinates: 59°14′59″N 137°27′00″W
- Parent range: Saint Elias Mountains
- Borders on: Alsek Ranges (East); Centennial Range (Northwest)

The Fairweather Range is the unofficial name for a mountain range located in the U.S. state of Alaska and the Canadian province of British Columbia. It is the southernmost range of the Saint Elias Mountains. The northernmost section of the range is situated in Tatshenshini-Alsek Provincial Park while the southernmost section resides in Glacier Bay National Park, in the Hoonah-Angoon Census Area. In between it goes through the southeastern corner of Yakutat Borough. Peaks of this range include Mount Fairweather (the highest point in British Columbia) and Mount Quincy Adams 4,150 m (13,615 ft).

The range is home to the Fairweather Fault, an active geologic transform fault of the larger Queen Charlotte Fault along the boundary between the Pacific and North American plates.

== Mountains ==
Mountain / Peak	Elevation		Prominence		FA	Coordinates
Mountain / Peak	ft	m	ft	m	FA	Coordinates
Mount Fairweather	15,325	4,671	12,963	3,951	1931	58°54′23″N 137°31′35″W
Mount Quincy Adams	13,620	4,150	1,350	410	1934	58°54′29″N 137°28′17″W
Mount Root	12,887	3,928	2,913	888	1977	58°59′8″N 137°30′1″W
Mount Crillon	12,726	3,879	7,215	2,199	1934	58°39′44″N 137°10′17″W
Mount Tlingit	12,606	3,842	2,006	611	Unk	58°53′35″N 137°23′38″W
Mount Watson	12,497	3,809	1,867	569	1974	59°0′28″N 137°33′20″W
Mount Salisbury	12,170	3,710	3,970	1,210	1977	58°51′3″N 137°22′19″W
Mount Wilbur	10,821	3,298	2,201	671	1975	58°44′23″N 137°19′3″W
Mount La Perouse	10,728	3,270	2,778	847	1952	58°33′46″N 137°4′57″W
Mount Lodge	10,548	3,215	2,871	875	Unk	59°6′27″N 137°32′38″W
Mount Orville	10,495	3,199	1,795	547	1995	58°44′12″N 137°16′19″W
Mount Dagelet	9,800	3,000	1,450	440	1933	58°37′N 137°14′W
Mount Eliza	9,692	2,954	3,130	954	Unk	59°5′48″N 137°23′39″W
Mount Turner	8,694	2,650	2,116	645	Unk	58°59′59″N 137°16′57″W
Mount Abbe	8,200	2,500	938	286	1977	58°47′52″N 137°4′39″W
Mount Forde	6,883	2,098	1,010	310	Unk	59°1′56″N 137°10′33″W
Mount Cooper	6,780	2,070	1,926	587	Unk	58°51′45″N 136°58′58″W

== Panorama ==
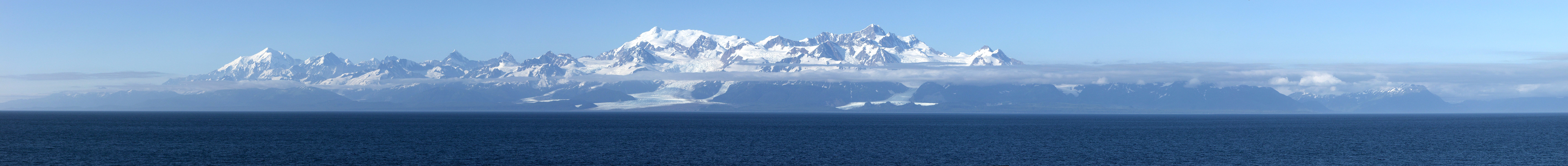
A panorama of the Fairweather Range from the Pacific Ocean. Mts. Crillon, Dagelet, and La Perouse centered.
