= American Alpine Journal =

Annual magazine

- Categories: Climbing, mountaineering
- Frequency: Annual
- Publisher: American Alpine Club
- First issue: 1929
- Country: United States
- Based in: Golden, Colorado
- Website: Journal Homepage
- ISSN: 0065-6925

The American Alpine Journal is an annual magazine published by the American Alpine Club. Its mission is "to document and communicate mountain exploration." The headquarters is in Golden, Colorado.

Subtitled as a compilation of "The World's Most Significant Climbs," the magazine contains feature stories about notable new routes and ascents, written by the climbers, as well as a large "Climbs and Expeditions" section containing short notes by climbers about new and noteworthy achievements. Some general articles about mountaineering, mountain medicine, the mountain environment, or other topics are also sometimes included. Each issue includes book reviews, memorials of deceased members, and club activities.

== History ==
The journal was established in 1929. In 1957 and 1958, the editor was Francis P. Farquhar. From 1960 to 1995, the editor was H. Adams Carter.. From 1996 to 2001, the editor was Christian Beckwith. Since 2002, the editor has been John Harlin III.

== Online access ==
In March 2007, the American Alpine Journal made free, full, searchable online access available for its issues dating back to 1966. All earlier issues will eventually be added.

== See also ==
- National Geographic Adventure
- Outside (magazine)
