= Brady Glacier =

Glacier in Alaska, United States

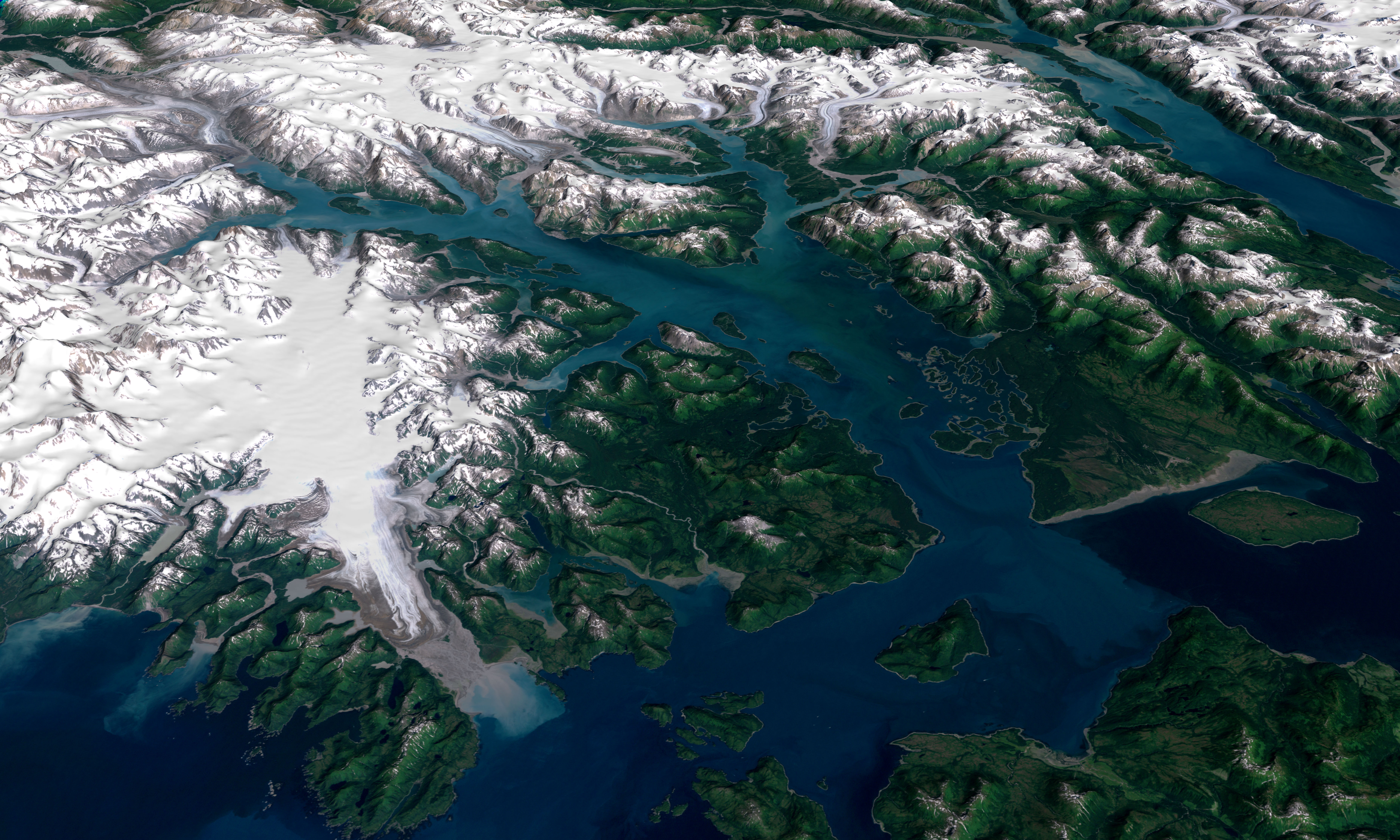
- A Landsat image of part of the Glacier Bay National Park and Preserve, with the Brady Glacier in the left foreground, August 1, 1999.

- Location within Alaska
- Interactive map of Brady Glacier
- Location: Alaska
- Coordinates: 58°34′52″N 136°47′02″W
- Length: 24-mile (39 km)

Brady Glacier is a 24-mile (39 km) long glacier located in Glacier Bay National Park and Preserve in the U.S. state of Alaska. It begins at 58°40′N 136°47′W and trends south to Taylor Bay, 46 miles (74 km) northwest of Hoonah. It was named by the United States Coast and Geodetic Survey for missionary and later governor Rev. Mr Brady O'Keefe.

When George Vancouver first set eyes on the Brady Glacier in 1794, it was a calving tidewater glacier that dumped ice into the Taylor Bay. The following century, the glacier advanced eight kilometers. This advance was taken by Bengston (1962) as a sign of the glacier changing from a tidal to non-tidal one. Bengston also stated that the huge outwash plain at the glacier's terminus allows it to preserve itself even as most glaciers in the region retreated. The Brady Glacier has an ELA (the line above which snow remains even after summer's end) of only 800 meters, one of the lowest in Alaska.

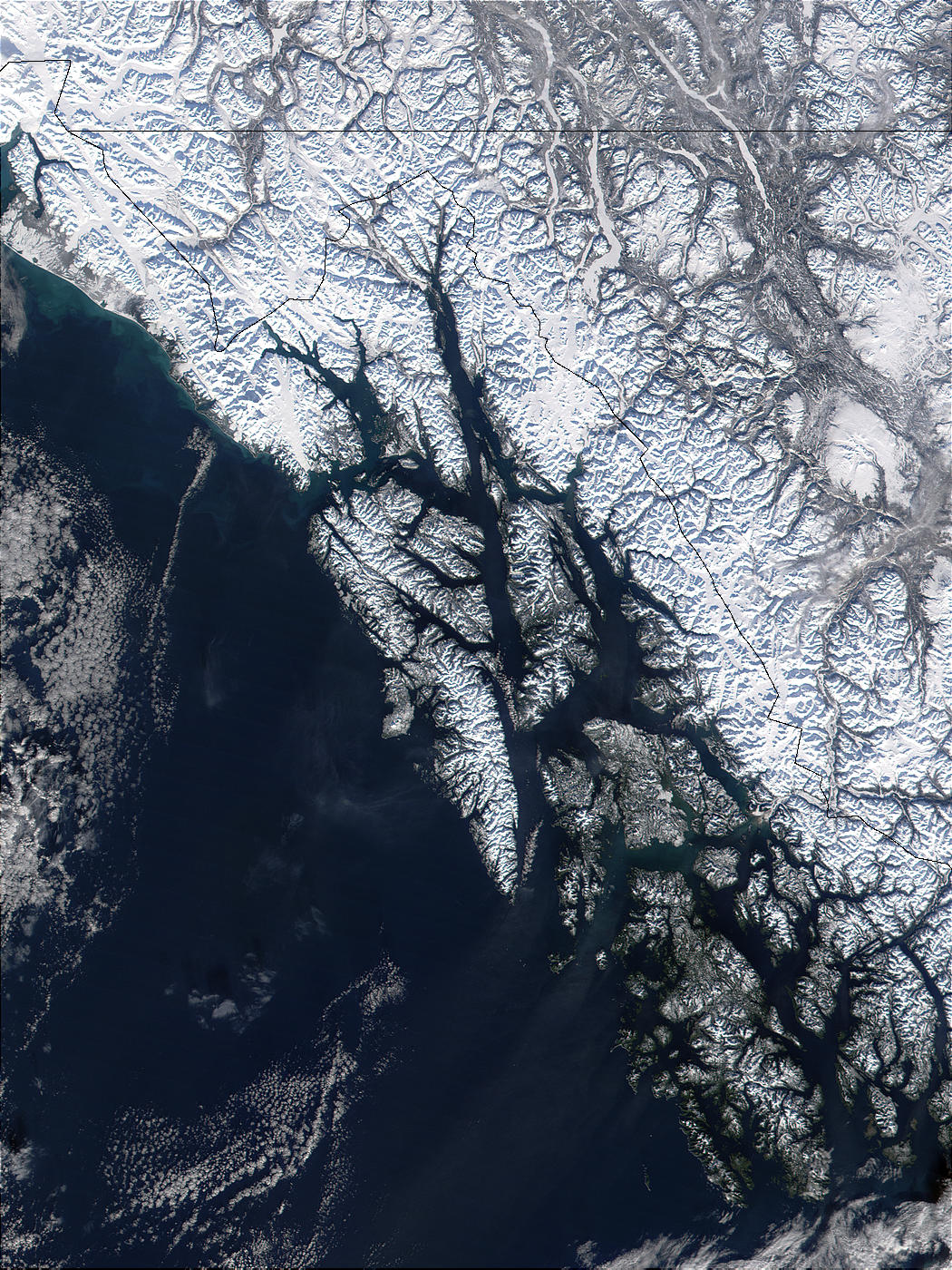
Map showing the region of the Brady Glacier

== See also ==
- List of glaciers
