= Mount Parker =

Mount Parker may refer to:

- Mount Parker (Antarctica), in the Admiralty Mountains of Antarctica
- Mount Parker (British Columbia), Canada
- Mount Parker (Nunavut), Canada
- Mount Parker Hynes (Nova Scotia), Canada
- Mount Parker (Hong Kong)
- Mount Parker (Philippines)
- Mount Parker (Alaska), USA
- Mount Parker (New Hampshire), USA
