= Mount Cooper (Alaska) =

Mountain in Alaska

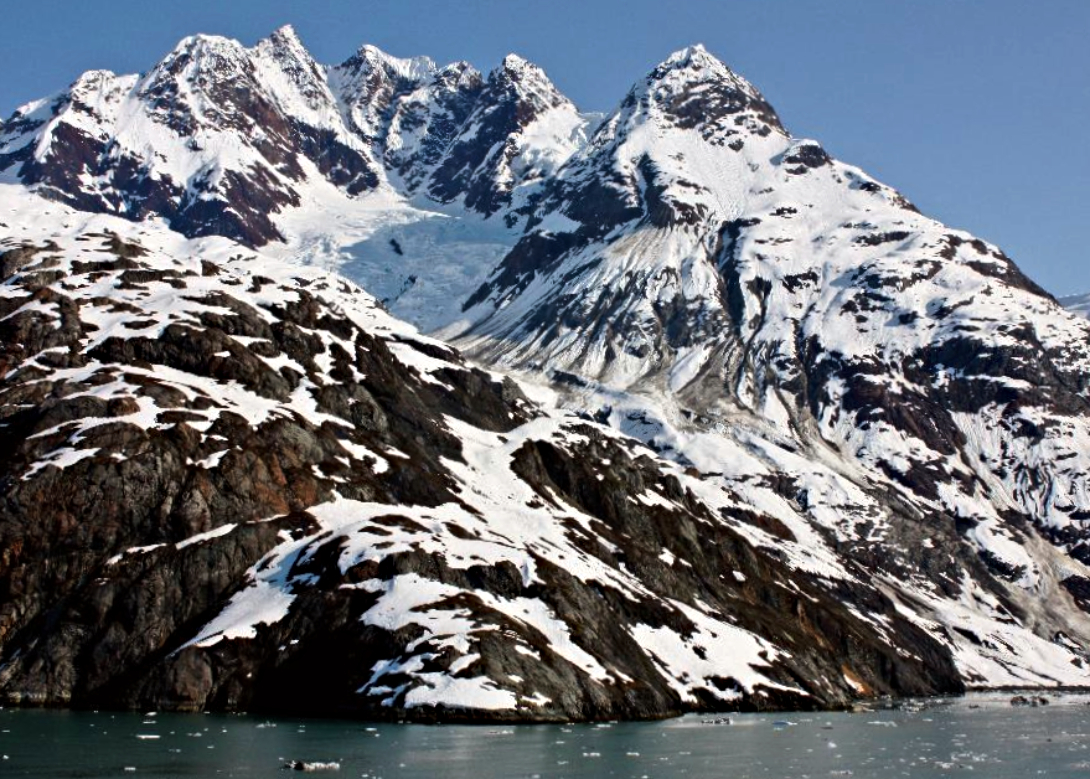
- Mount Cooper, northwest aspect

Highest point
- Elevation: 6,780 ft (2,070 m)
- Prominence: 1,926 ft (587 m)
- Parent peak: Mount Abbe (8200+ ft)
- Coordinates: 58°51′44″N 136°58′59″W

Geography
- Location within Alaska
- Interactive map of Mount Cooper
- Location: Glacier Bay National Park and Preserve; Hoonah-Angoon; Alaska, United States
- Parent range: Fairweather Range; Saint Elias Mountains
- Topo map: USGS Mount Fairweather D-3

Climbing
- Easiest route: Mountaineering

Mount Cooper is a 6780-foot (2067-meter) mountain summit located in the Fairweather Range of the Saint Elias Mountains, in southeast Alaska. The peak is situated in Glacier Bay National Park and Preserve at the entrance to Johns Hopkins Inlet, 100 mi (161 km) northwest of Juneau, and 5.6 mi (9 km) northeast of Mount Abbe, which is the nearest higher peak. Although modest in elevation, relief is significant since the mountain rises up from tidewater in less than two miles. Mount Cooper can be seen from Johns Hopkins Inlet which is a popular destination for cruise ships. The mountain's name was proposed in the 1950s for William Skinner Cooper (1884–1978), a plant ecologist who performed vegetation-glacier relationship studies in the Glacier Bay area, and was chairman of the committee of scientists which proposed establishing Glacier Bay National Monument. The mountain's name was officially adopted in 1980 by the United States Geological Survey following Cooper's death. The months May through June offer the most favorable weather for climbing Mount Cooper.

== Climate ==
Based on the Köppen climate classification, Mount Cooper has a subarctic climate with cold, snowy winters, and mild summers. Temperatures can drop below −20 °C with wind chill factors below −30 °C. This climate supports small hanging glaciers on its slopes as well as the larger Kashoto Glacier to the west and Lamplugh Glacier to the east. Precipitation runoff and meltwater from its glaciers drains into Johns Hopkins Inlet.

== Gallery ==
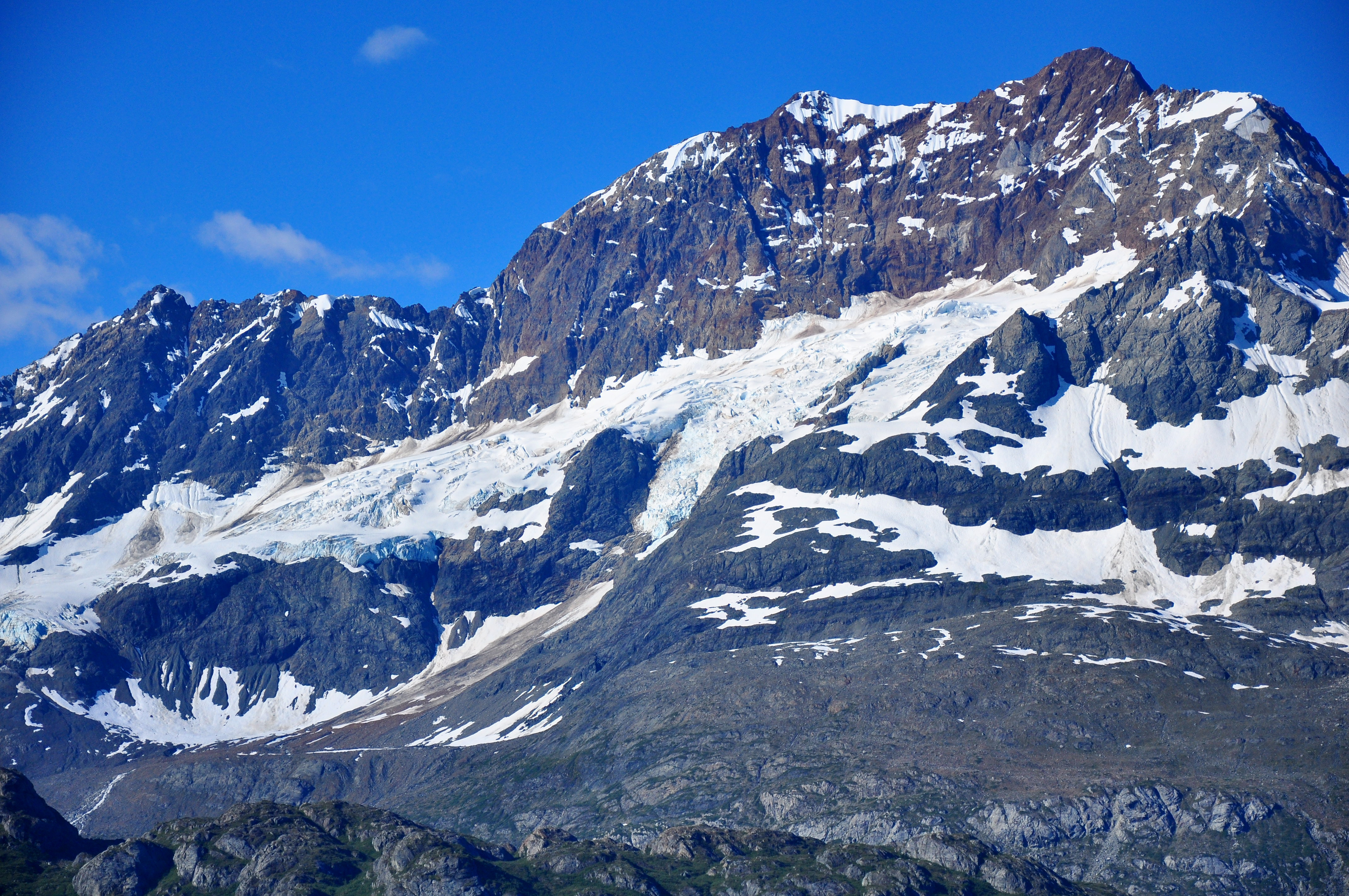
Mount Cooper, northeast aspect

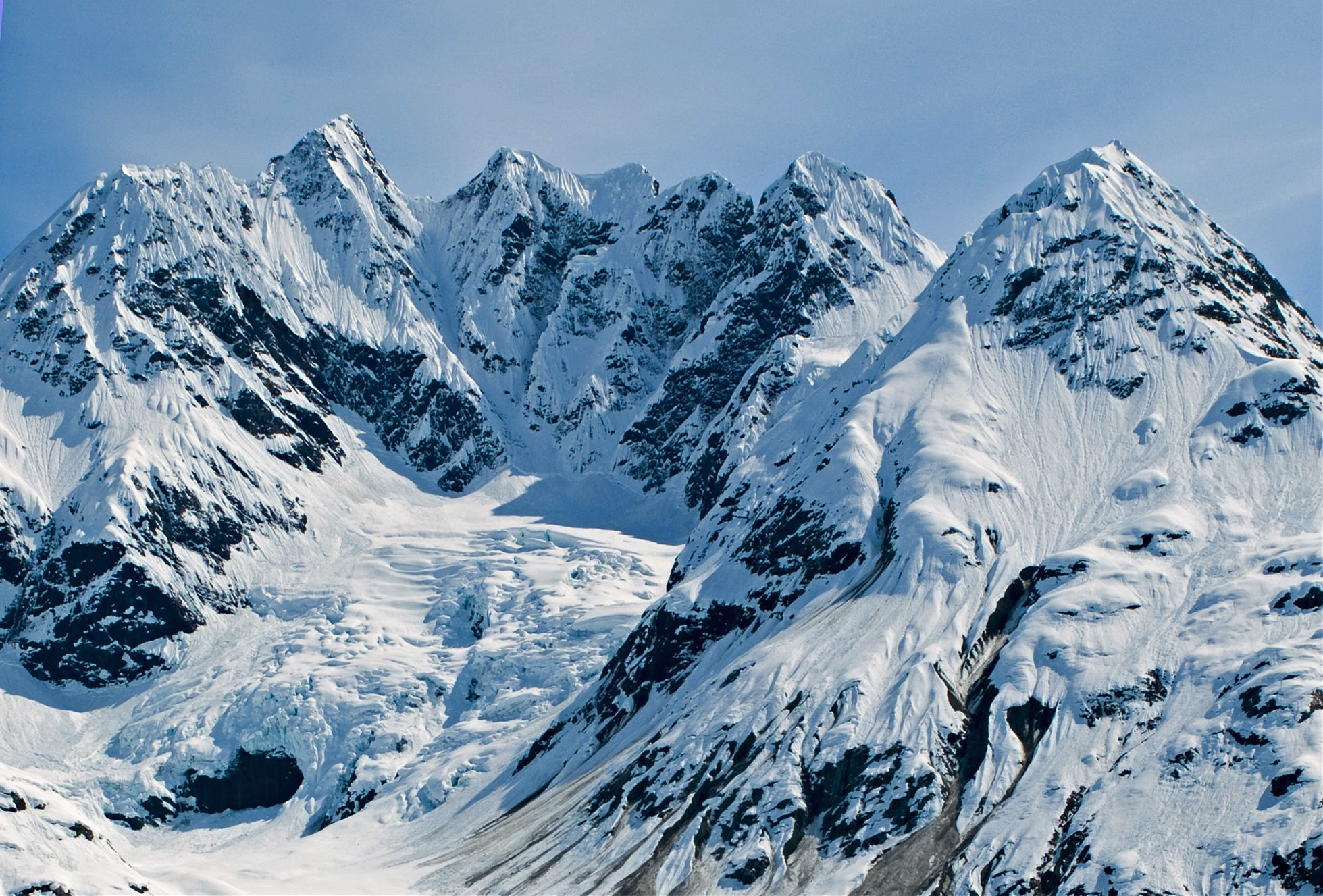
Summit detail

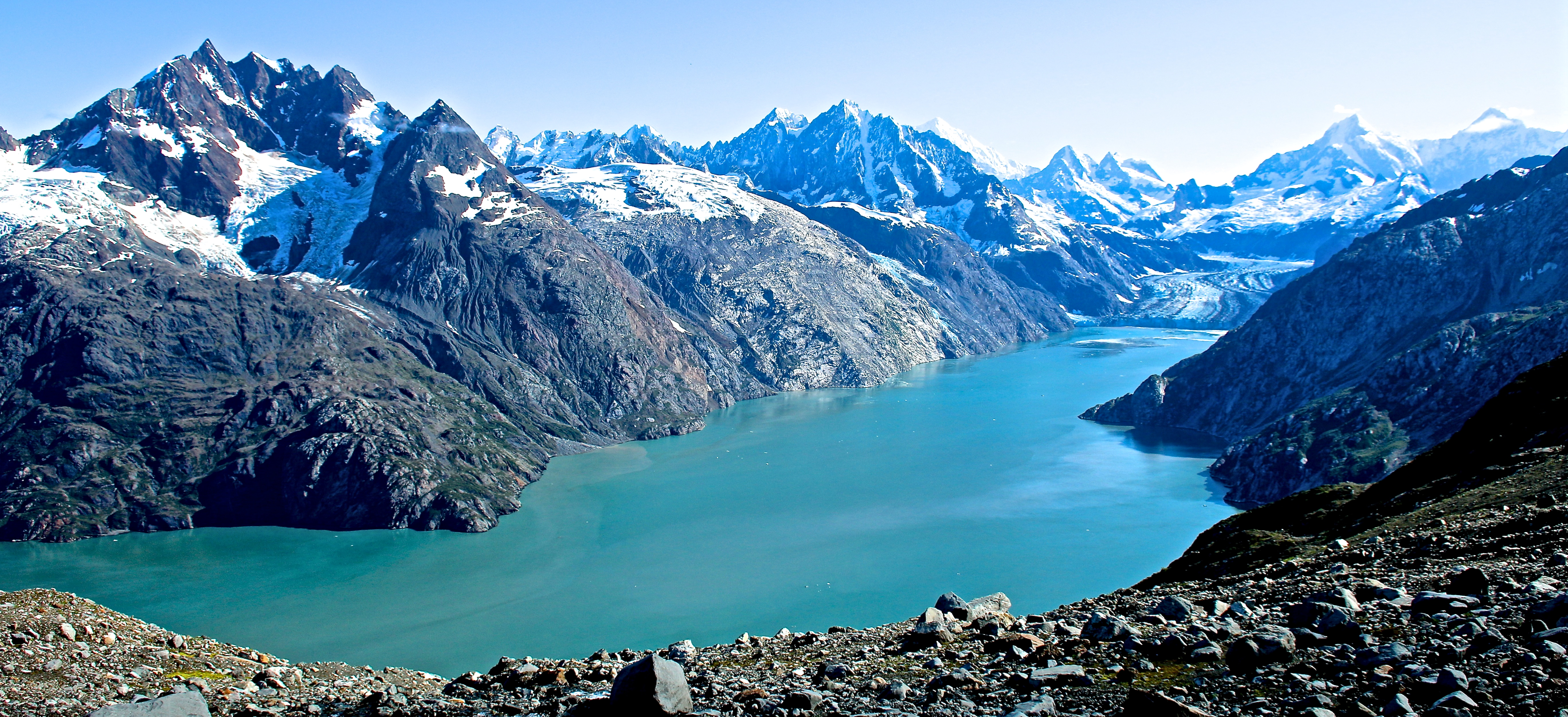
Mt. Cooper (left) and Johns Hopkins Inlet. Mt. Abbe (center)

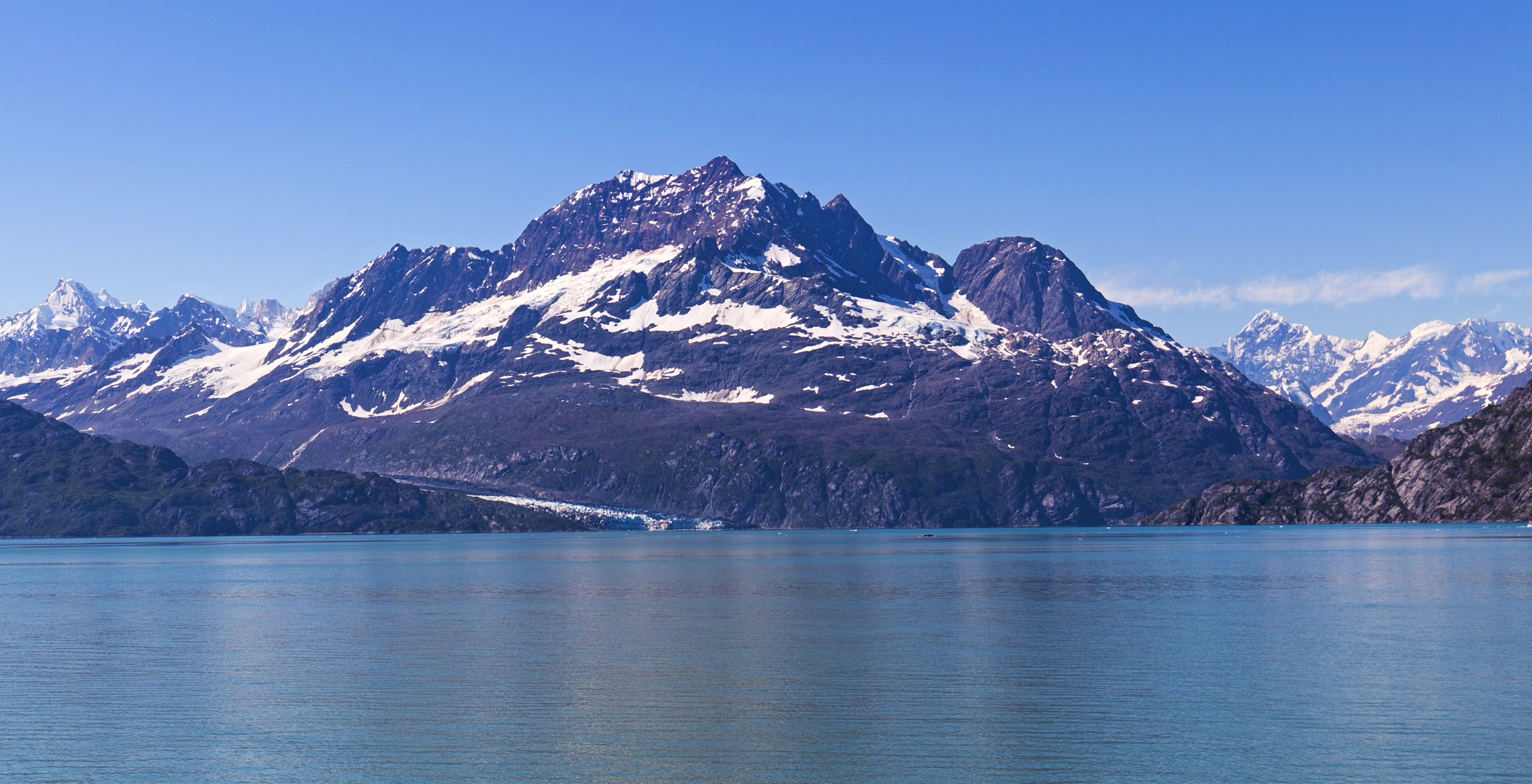
Mt. Cooper from northeast

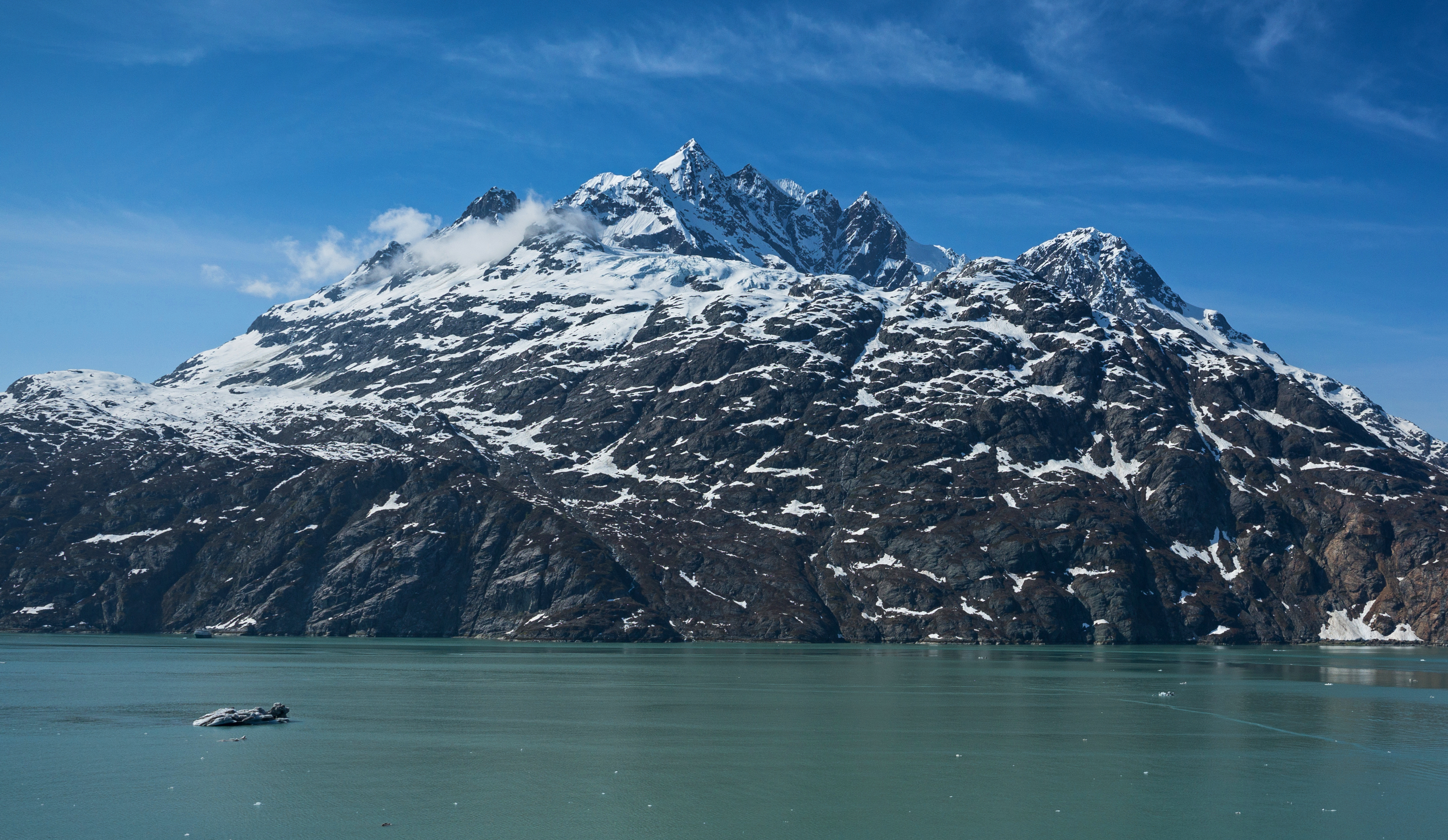
Mount Cooper

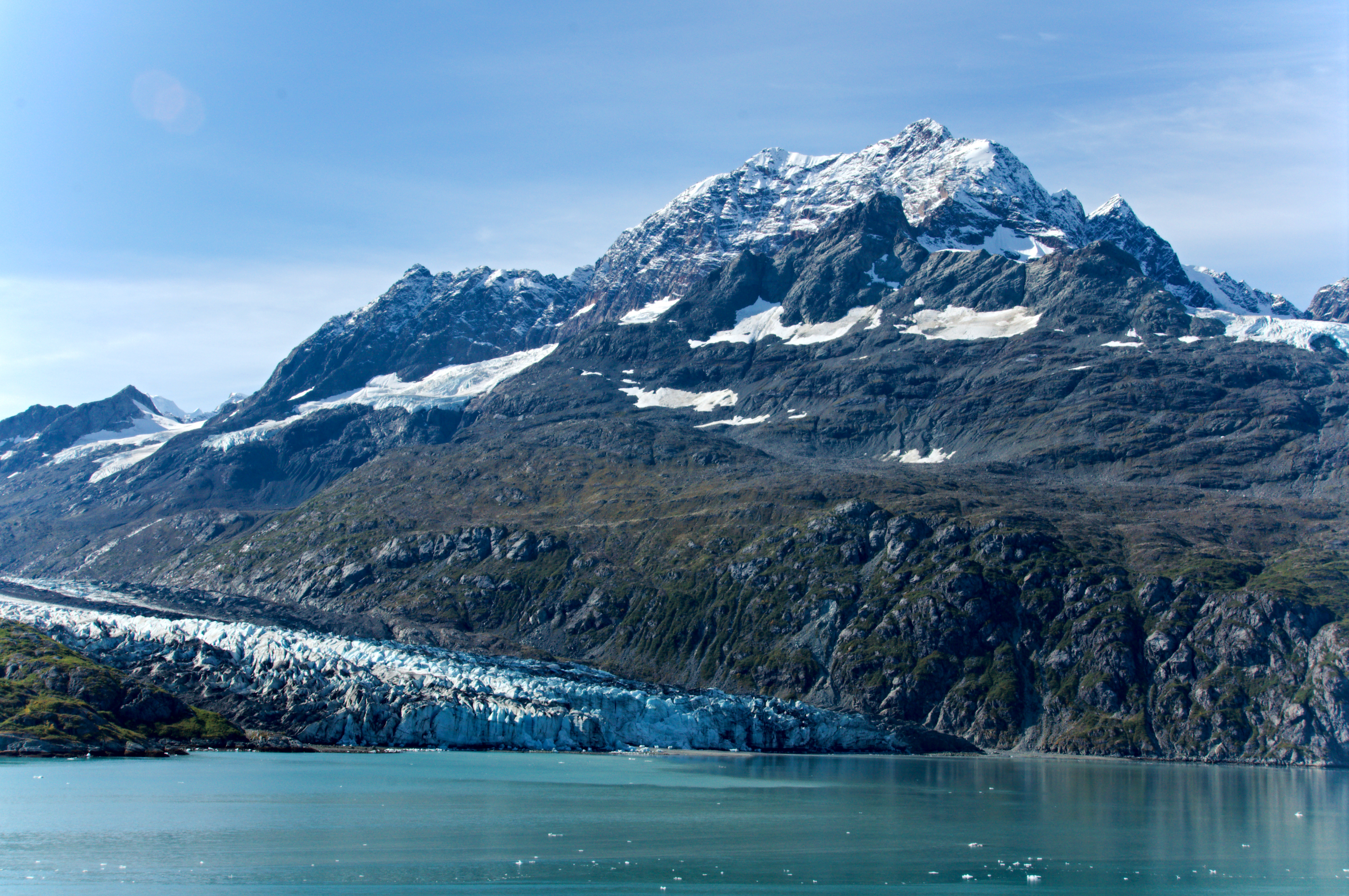
Mount Cooper and Lamplugh Glacier

== See also ==
- List of mountain peaks of Alaska
- Geography of Alaska
