= Mount Parker (Alaska) =

Mountain in Alaska, United States

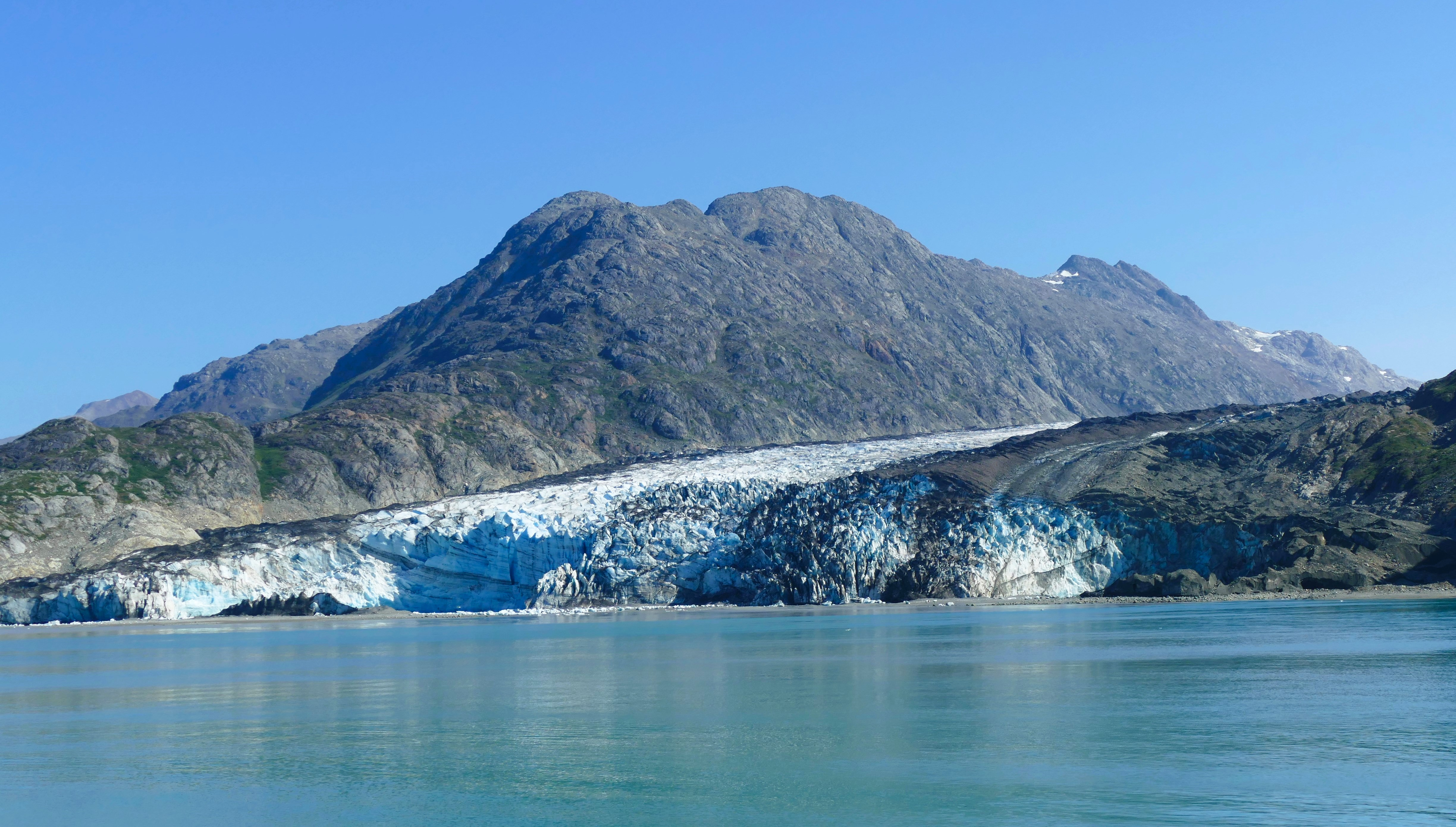
- Northwest aspect, above Lamplugh Glacier

Highest point
- Elevation: 3,170 ft (966 m)
- Prominence: 220 ft (67 m)
- Isolation: 1.65 mi (2.66 km)
- Coordinates: 58°51′45″N 136°53′10″W

Naming
- Etymology: Abraham L. Parker

Geography
- Location within Alaska
- Interactive map of Mount Parker
- Country: United States
- State: Alaska
- Census Area: Hoonah–Angoon
- Protected area: Glacier Bay National Park
- Parent range: Saint Elias Mountains; Fairweather Range
- Topo map: USGS Mount Fairweather D-3

Geology
- Rock age: Cretaceous
- Rock type: Granodiorite

Mount Parker is a 3,170-foot (966 m) mountain summit in the US state of Alaska.

== Description ==
Mount Parker is located in the Fairweather Range of the Saint Elias Mountains. It is set within Glacier Bay National Park and Preserve and is situated 3.4 miles (5.5 km) east of Mount Cooper. Although modest in elevation, topographic relief is significant as the summit rises from tidewater of Glacier Bay in 1.7 miles (2.7 km) and the west face rises 2,000 feet (610 m) above the Lamplugh Glacier in 0.5 mi (0.80 km). The mountain's toponym has been officially adopted by the U.S. Board on Geographic Names.

== Climate ==
Based on the Köppen climate classification, Mount Parker is located in a marine subpolar climate zone, with long, cold, snowy winters, and cool summers. Weather systems coming off the Gulf of Alaska are forced upwards by the Saint Elias Mountains (orographic lift), causing heavy precipitation in the form of rainfall and snowfall. Winter temperatures can drop below 0 °F with wind chill factors below −10 °F. This climate supports the Reid and Lamplugh glaciers on opposite sides of this peak.

== Geology ==
The dominant rock of the Mount Parker area between Lamplugh Glacier and Reid Glacier is granodiorite and quartz diorite which contains quartz vein gold lodes. The gold was processed by six mines of the Reid Inlet gold area. The LeRoy Mine was the largest mine, discovered in 1938 by Gustavus founder and resident, Abraham L. Parker (1866–1941), and his son, Leslie F. Parker.

== See also ==
- Geography of Alaska
