= Lamplugh Glacier =

Glacier in the United States

Coordinates: 58°49′56″N 136°53′43″W

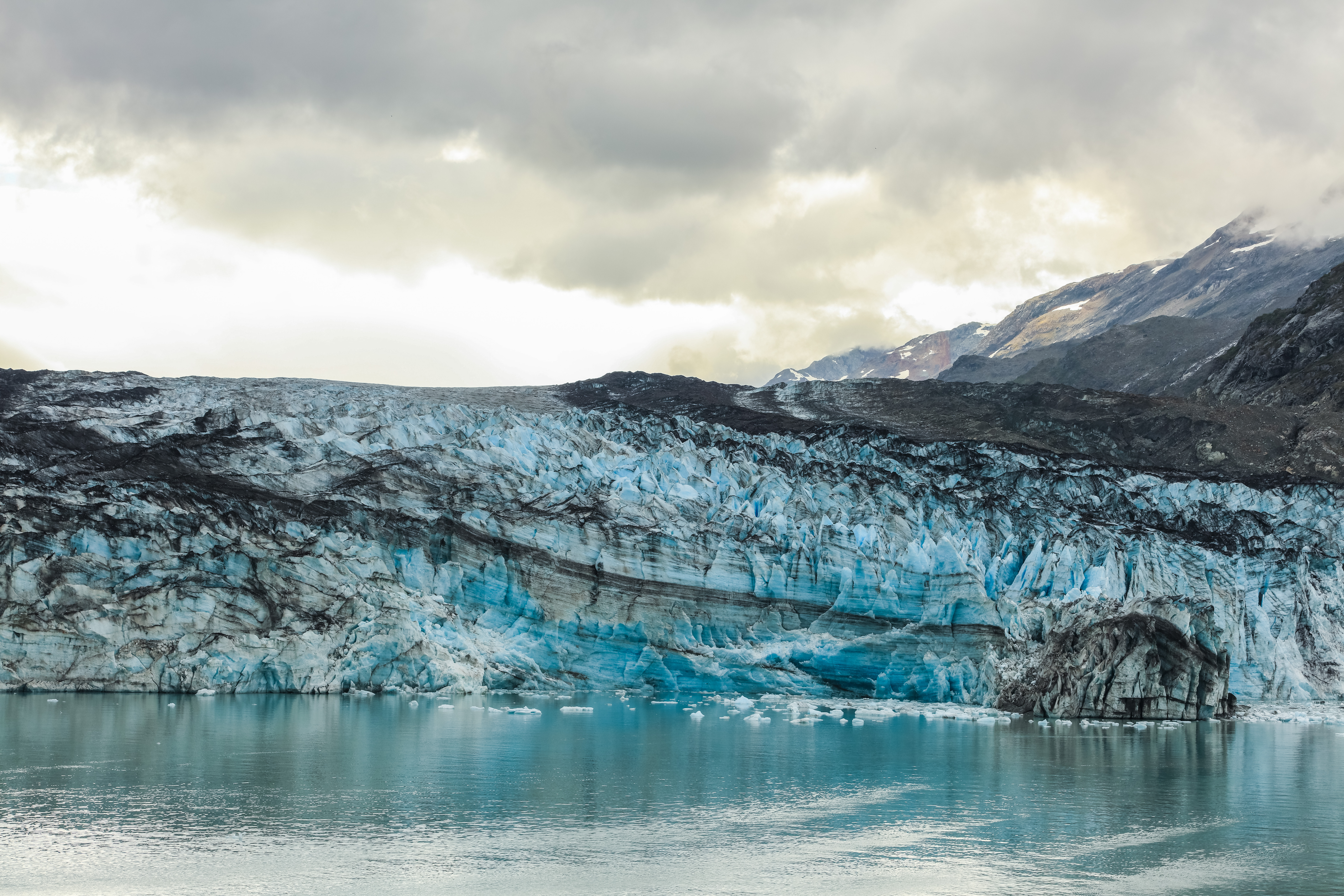
The terminus of Lamplugh Glacier in 2017.

Lamplugh Glacier is an 8-mile-long (13 km) glacier located in Glacier Bay National Park and Preserve in the U.S. state of Alaska. It leads north to its 1961 terminus in Johns Hopkins Inlet, 1.4 miles (2.3 km) west of Ptarmigan Creek and 76 miles (122 km) northwest of Hoonah. The glacier was named by Lawrence Martin of the U.S. Geological Survey around 1912 for English geologist George William Lamplugh (1859–1926), who visited Glacier Bay in 1884.

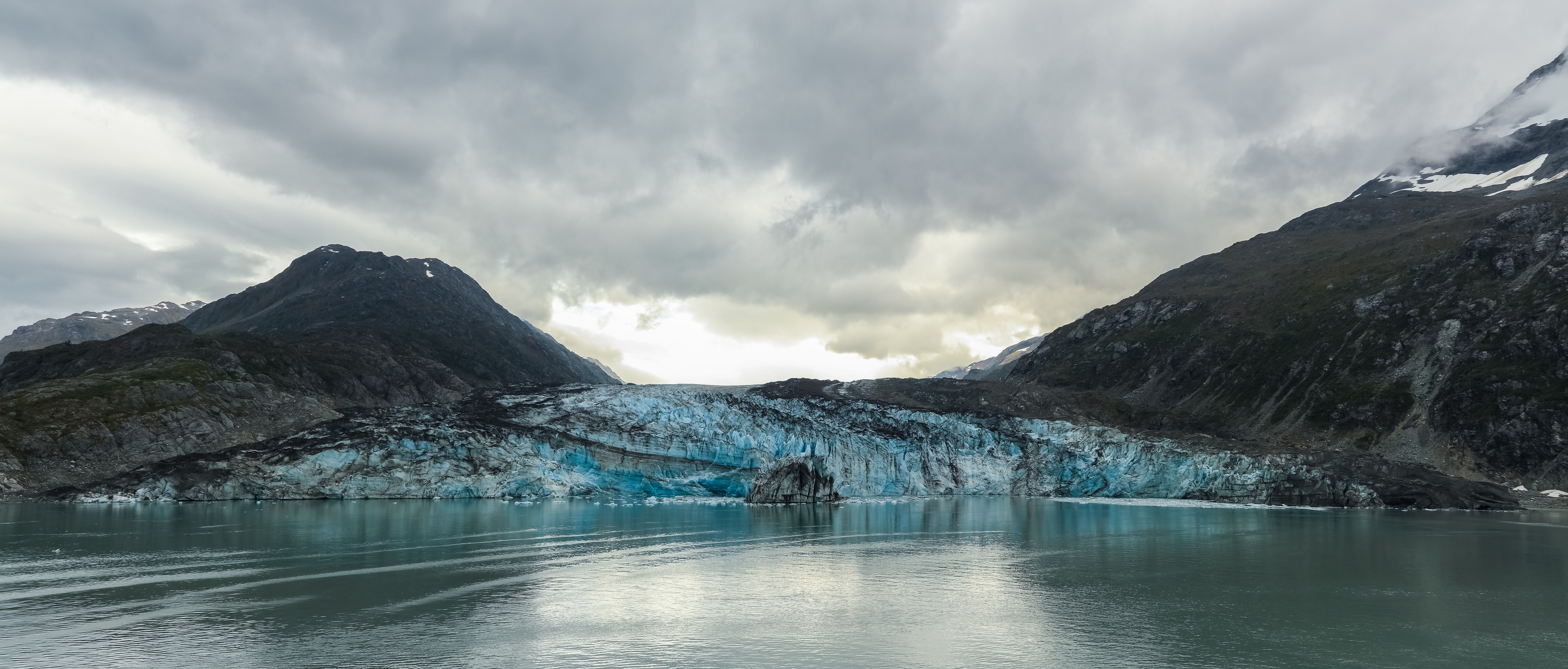
General view (Mount Parker to left)

On 28 June 2016, a 1,200-meter (3,900 ft) mountainside collapsed onto Lamplugh Glacier, causing a landslide with a volume of between 62,000,000 and 79,800,000 cubic meters (81,100,000 and 104,000,000 cu yd) that dropped 120,000,000 metric tons (132,000,000 short tons) of rock and debris onto the glacier. The landslide left a 9-kilometer (5.6 mi) long debris field on the glacier's surface.

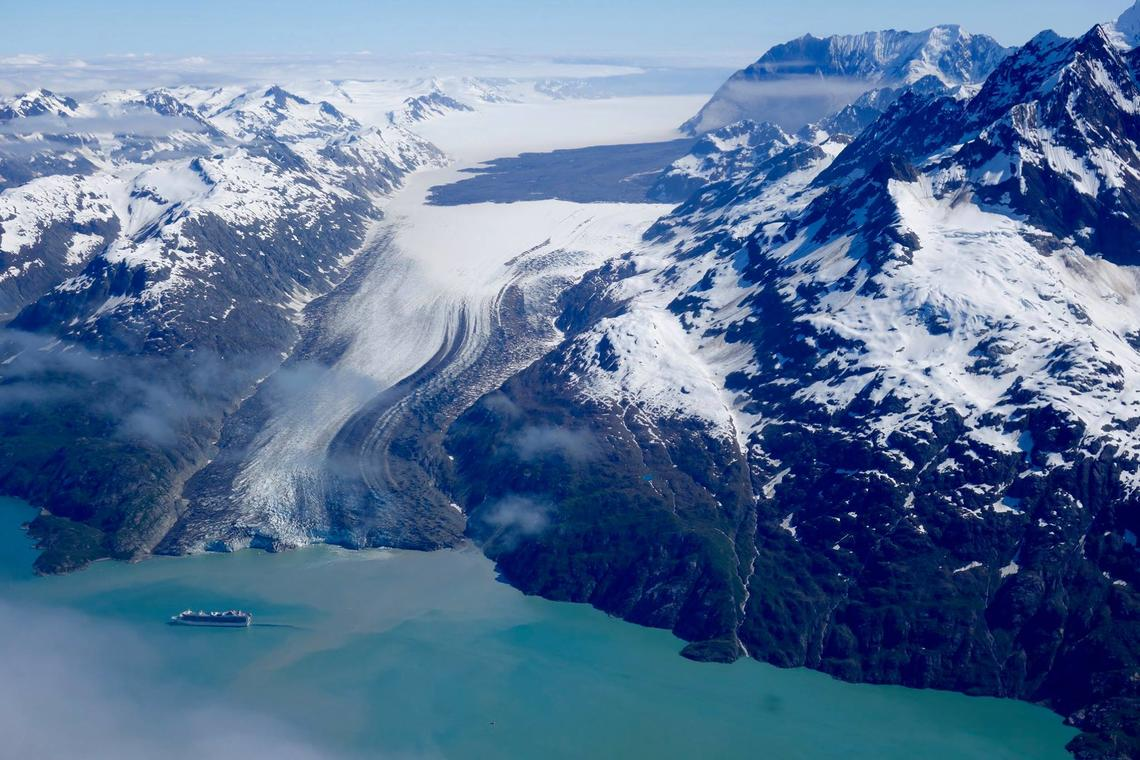
Lamplugh Glacier aerial view

== See also ==
- List of glaciers
